= 37th Cabinet of Kuwait =

Executive arm of the State of Kuwait

The Cabinet of Kuwait is the chief executive body of the State of Kuwait. The following cabinet is the 37th in the history of Kuwait, after the previous cabinet resigned on 6 December 2020. On 8 December 2020, Amir of Kuwait Sheikh Nawaf Al-Ahmad Al-Jaber Al-Sabah assigned Sheikh Sabah Al-Khaled Al-Hamad Al-Sabah as Prime Minister . The Amir has also assigned the Prime Minister to refer the cabinet line-up for their appointment. On 14 December, the Prime Minister formed the new cabinet and the Amir issued a decree on the formation of the government. The new cabinet includes seven newcomers, three former ministers and six member including the premier himself from the previous cabinet. On 12 January 2021, the Ministers of the Cabinet tendered in their resignations to the Prime Minister. On 13 January 2021, the Prime Minister submitted the government's resignation to the Amir. On 18 January 2021, the Amir accepted the resignation of the Prime Minister and his government. The cabinet will be proceeding in a care taking manner until the formation of the new cabinet.

| Incumbent | Office | Website | Since |
|---|---|---|---|
| Sabah Al-Khaled Al-Hamad Al-Sabah | Prime Minister | www.pm.gov.kw | 14 December 2020 – 18 January 2021 |
| Hamad Jaber Al-Ali Al-Sabah | Deputy Prime Minister and Minister of Defense | www.mod.gov.kw | 14 December 2020 – 18 January 2021 |
| Anas Khalid Al-Saleh | Deputy Prime Minister and Minister of State for Cabinet Affairs | www.cmgs.gov.kw | 14 December 2020 – 18 January 2021 |
| Essa Al-Kandari | Minister of Awqaf and Islamic Affairs | cms.islam.gov.kw | 14 December 2020 – 18 January 2021 |
| Faisal Al-Medlej | Minister of Commerce and Industry | www.moci.gov.kw | 14 December 2020 – 18 January 2021 |
| Dr. Ali-Al-Mudhaf | Minister of Education | www.moe.edu.kw | 14 December 2020 – 18 January 2021 |
| Dr. Mohammad Al-Fares | Minister of Electricity and Water | www.mew.gov.kw | 14 December 2020 – 18 January 2021 |
| Khalifa Hamada | Minister of Finance | www.mof.gov.kw | 14 December 2020 – 18 January 2021 |
| Dr. Ahmad Nasser Al-Mohammad Al-Sabah | Minister of Foreign Affairs | www.mofa.gov.kw | 14 December 2020 – 18 January 2021 |
| Dr. Basel Hamoud Al-Hamad Al-Sabah | Minister of Health | www.moh.gov.kw | 14 December 2020 – 18 January 2021 |
| Dr. Ali-Al-Mudhaf | Minister of Higher Education | www.mohe.edu.kw | 14 December 2020 – 18 January 2021 |
| Abdulrahman Al-Mutairi | Minister of Information | www.cmgs.gov.kw | 14 December 2020 – 18 January 2021 |
| Thamer Ali Sabah Al-Salem Al-Sabah | Minister of Interior | www.moi.gov.kw | 14 December 2020 – 18 January 2021 |
| Dr. Dr. Nawaf Al-Yassin | Minister of Justice | www.moj.gov.kw | 14 December 2020 – 18 January 2021 |
| Dr. Mohammad Al-Fares | Minister of Oil | www.moo.gov.kw | 14 December 2020 – 18 January 2021 |
| Dr. Rana Al-Fares | Minister of Public Works | www.mpw.gov.kw | 14 December 2020 – 18 January 2021 |
| Essa Al-Kandari | Minister of Social Affairs and Labor | www.mosal.gov.kw | 14 December 2020 – 18 January 2021 |
| Faisal Al-Medlej | Minister of State for Economic Affairs | | 14 December 2020 – 18 January 2021 |
| Dr. Abdullah Marafi | Minister of State for Housing Affairs | www.housing.gov.kw | 14 December 2020 – 18 January 2021 |
| Dr. Rana Al-Fares | Minister of State for Municipal Affairs | www.baladia.gov.kw | 14 December 2020 – 18 January 2021 |
| Mubarak Al-Harees | Minister of State for National Assembly Affairs | www.mona.gov.kw | 14 December 2020 – 18 January 2021 |
| Dr. Abdullah Marafi | Minister of State for Services Affairs | www.moc.gov.kw | 14 December 2020 – 18 January 2021 |
| Abdulrahman Al-Mutairi | Minister of State for Youth Affairs | www.youth.gov.kw | 14 December 2020 – 18 January 2021 |

== Official Amiri Decree published in Official Gazette/Kuwait Digest ==
| Decree No/Year | Issued on | Edition No | Published on | Notes |
|---|---|---|---|---|
| 176/2020 | 14 December 2020 | 1514 | 20 December 2020 | Formation of the New Cabinet |
| 177/2020 | 30 December 2020 | 1517 | 10 January 2021 | Ministerial Deputations |
| 178/2020 | 30 December 2020 | 1517 | 10 January 2021 | |
| 179/2020 | 30 December 2020 | 1517 | 10 January 2021 | |
| 180/2020 | 30 December 2020 | 1517 | 10 January 2021 | |
| 181/2020 | 30 December 2020 | 1517 | 10 January 2021 | |
| 182/2020 | 30 December 2020 | 1517 | 10 January 2021 | |
| 183/2020 | 30 December 2020 | 1517 | 10 January 2021 | |
| 184/2020 | 30 December 2020 | 1517 | 10 January 2021 | |
| 186/2020 | 30 December 2020 | 1517 | 10 January 2021 | |
| | 18 January 2021 | 1519 | 24 January 2021 | Resignation of the Prime Minister & Ministers |

== See also ==
- Cabinet of Kuwait
- 35th Cabinet of Kuwait
- 36th Cabinet of Kuwait
- 38th Cabinet of Kuwait
