= 36th Cabinet of Kuwait =

The Cabinet of Kuwait is the chief executive body of the State of Kuwait. The following cabinet is the 36th in the history of Kuwait. It was formed on 17 December 2019, after the previous Cabinet resigned on 14 November 2019. On 30 January 2020, Minister Ghadeer Al-Aseeri tendered her resignation. On 16 February 2020, a cabinet reshuffle took place and Kuwait's Amir received new cabinet members for oath ceremony. On 2 March 2020, Minister Mohammad Bushehri's resignation as Minister of Electricity & Water was accepted. On 26 October 2020, Minister Mohammad Al-Jabri's resignation as Minister of Information and Minister of State for Youth Affairs was accepted. On 6 December 2020, the resignation of the Prime Minister and all the ministers were accepted by the Emir of Kuwait. The cabinet will be proceeding in a care taking manner until the formation of the new cabinet.

Incumbent	Office	Website	Since
Sabah Al-Khaled Al-Hamad Al-Sabah	Prime Minister	www.pm.gov.kw	19 November 2019 – 6 December 2020
Ahmad Mansour Al-Ahmad Al-Sabah	Deputy Prime Minister and Minister of Defense	www.mod.gov.kw	17 December 2019 – 6 December 2020
Anas Khalid Al-Saleh	Deputy Prime Minister and Minister of Interior	www.moi.gov.kw	17 December 2019 – 6 December 2020
Anas Khalid Al-Saleh	Deputy Prime Minister and Minister of State for Cabinet Affairs	www.cmgs.gov.kw	6 January 2014 – 6 December 2020
Fahd Mohammed Mohsen Al-Afasi	Minister of Awqaf and Islamic Affairs	cms.islam.gov.kw	25 December 2018 – 6 December 2020
Khaled Naser Al-Roudhan	Minister of Commerce and Industry	www.moci.gov.kw	10 December 2016 – 6 December 2020
Dr. Saud Al-Harbi	Minister of Education	www.moe.edu.kw	17 December 2019 – 6 December 2020
Dr. Khalid Ali Mohammad Al-Fadel; Mohammed Hejji Bushehri; Dr. Khalid Ali Mohammad Al-Fadel(Acting)	Minister of Electricity and Water	www.mew.gov.kw	25 December 2018 – 16 February 2020; 16 February 2020 - 2 March 2020; 2 March 2020 – 6 December 2020
Mariam Eqeal Al-Saied Hashem Al-Aqeal; Barrak Ali Barrak Al-Shitan	Minister of Finance	www.mof.gov.kw	17 December 2019 – 16 February 2020; 16 February 2020 – 6 December 2020
Dr. Ahmad Nasser Al-Mohammad Al-Sabah	Minister of Foreign Affairs	www.mofa.gov.kw	17 December 2019 – 6 December 2020
Dr. Basel Hamoud Al-Hamad Al-Sabah	Minister of Health	www.moh.gov.kw	11 December 2017 – 6 December 2020
Dr. Saud Al-Harbi	Minister of Higher Education	www.mohe.edu.kw	17 December 2019 – 6 December 2020
Mohammad Nasir Abdullah Al-Jabri; Dr. Ahmad Nasser Al-Mohammad Al-Sabah(Acting)	Minister of Information	www.cmgs.gov.kw	11 December 2017 – 26 October 2020; 26 October 2020 – 6 December 2020
Fahd Mohammed Mohsen Al-Afasi	Minister of Justice	www.moj.gov.kw	11 December 2017 – 6 December 2020
Dr. Khalid Ali Mohammad Al-Fadel	Minister of Oil	www.moo.gov.kw	25 December 2018 – 6 December 2020
Dr. Rana Al-Fares	Minister of Public Works	www.mpw.gov.kw	17 December 2019 – 6 December 2020
Dr. Ghadeer Aseeri; Waleed Al-Jassem(Acting); Mariam Eqeal Al-Saied Hashem Al-Aqeal	Minister of Social Affairs and Labor	www.mosal.gov.kw	17 December 2019 – 30 January 2020; 30 January 2020 – 16 February 2020; 16 February 2020 – 6 December 2020
Mariam Eqeal Al-Saied Hashem Al-Aqeal	Minister of State for Economic Affairs		25 December 2018 – 6 December 2020
Dr. Rana Al-Fares	Minister of State for Housing Affairs	www.housing.gov.kw	17 December 2019 – 6 December 2020
Waleed Al-Jassem	Minister of State for Municipal Affairs	www.baladia.gov.kw	17 December 2019 – 6 December 2020
Mubarak Al-Harees	Minister of State for National Assembly Affairs	www.mona.gov.kw	17 December 2019 – 6 December 2020
Mubarak Al-Harees	Minister of State for Services Affairs	www.moc.gov.kw	17 December 2019 – 6 December 2020
Mohammad Nasir Abdullah Al-Jabri; Khaled Naser Al-Roudhan(Acting)	Minister of State for Youth Affairs	www.youth.gov.kw	26 March 2018 – 26 October 2020; 26 October 2020 – 6 December 2020

== Official Amiri Decree published in Official Gazette/Kuwait Digest ==
Decree No/Year	Issued on	Edition No	Published on	Notes
290/2019	17 December 2019	1476	22 December 2019	Formation of the New Cabinet
20/2020	27 January 2020	1482	2 February 2020	
41/2020	30 January 2020	1483	9 February 2020	Resignation of Minister of Social Affairs & Labor
42/2020	30 January 2020	1483	9 February 2020	Acting Minister of Social Affairs & Labor
49/2020	16 February 2020	1485	23 February 2020	Cabinet Reshuffle
55/2020	18 February 2020	1486	1 March 2020	
60/2020	2 March 2020	1487	8 March 2020	Resignation of Minister of Electricity & Water
61/2020	2 March 2020	1487	8 March 2020	Acting Minister of Electricity & Water
151/2020	25 October 2020	1507	1 November 2020	Resignation of Minister of Information & Minister of State for Youth Affairs
152/2020	25 October 2020	1507	1 November 2020	Acting Minister of State for Youth Affairs
153/2020	25 October 2020	1507	1 November 2020	Acting Minister of Information

== See also ==
- Cabinet of Kuwait
- 35th Cabinet of Kuwait
- 37th Cabinet of Kuwait
