= 38th Cabinet of Kuwait =

The Cabinet of Kuwait is the chief executive body of the State of Kuwait. The 38th cabinet in the history of Kuwait was appointed. On 24 January 2021, Amir of Kuwait His Highness Sheikh Nawaf Al-Ahmad Al-Jaber Al-Sabah assigned His Highness Sheikh Sabah Al-Khaled Al-Hamad Al-Sabah as Prime Minister . The Amir has also assigned the Prime Minister to refer the cabinet line-up for their appointment. On 2 March, the Prime Minister formed the new cabinet and the Amir issued a decree on the formation of the government. On 8 November 2021, the Prime Minister submitted the government's resignation to the Amir. On 14 November 2021, the Amir accepted the resignation of the Prime Minister and his government. The government will function as care-taker until the formation of the new government.

Incumbent	Office	Website	Since
Sabah Al-Khaled Al-Hamad Al-Sabah	Prime Minister	www.pm.gov.kw	2 March 2021 – 14 November 2021
Hamad Jaber Al-Ali Al-Sabah	Deputy Prime Minister and Minister of Defense	www.mod.gov.kw	2 March 2021 – 14 November 2021
Abdullah Youssef Abdurrahman Al-Roumi	Deputy Prime Minister, Minister of Justice and Minister of State for Nazaha Enhancement	www.moj.gov.kw	2 March 2021 – 14 November 2021
Issa Ahmad Mohammad Hassan Al-Kandari	Minister of Awqaf and Islamic Affairs	www.islam.gov.kw	2 March 2021 – 14 November 2021
Abdullah Issa Al-Salman	Minister of Commerce and Industry	www.moci.gov.kw	2 March 2021 – 14 November 2021
Dr. Ali Fahad Al-Mudhaf	Minister of Education	www.moe.edu.kw	2 March 2021 – 14 November 2021
Dr. Mashaan Mohammad Mashaan Al-Otaibi	Minister of Electricity, Water and Renewable Energy	www.mew.gov.kw	2 March 2021 – 14 November 2021
Khalifa Musaed Hamada	Minister of Finance	www.mof.gov.kw	2 March 2021 – 14 November 2021
Dr. Ahmad Nasser Al-Mohammad Al-Sabah	Minister of Foreign Affairs	www.mofa.gov.kw	2 March 2021 – 14 November 2021
Dr. Basel Hamoud Al-Hamad Al-Sabah	Minister of Health	www.moh.gov.kw	2 March 2021 – 14 November 2021
Dr. Mohammad Abdullatif Al-Fares	Minister of Higher Education	www.mohe.edu.kw	2 March 2021 – 14 November 2021
Abdurrahman Baddah Al-Mutairi	Minister of Information and Culture	www.cmgs.gov.kw	2 March 2021 – 14 November 2021
Thamer Ali Sabah Al-Salem Al-Sabah	Minister of Interior	www.moi.gov.kw	2 March 2021 – 14 November 2021
Dr. Mohammad Abdullatif Al-Fares	Minister of Oil	www.moo.gov.kw	2 March 2021 – 14 November 2021
Dr. Rana Abdullah Al-Fares	Minister of Public Works	www.mpw.gov.kw	2 March 2021 – 14 November 2021
Dr. Mashaan Mohammad Mashaan Al-Otaibi	Minister of Social Affairs and Societal Development	www.mosa.gov.kw	2 March 2021 – 14 November 2021
Dr. Ahmad Nasser Al-Mohammad Al-Sabah	Minister of State for Cabinet Affairs	www.cmgs.gov.kw	2 March 2021 – 14 November 2021
Dr. Rana Abdullah Al-Fares	Minister of State for Communication and Information Technology	moc.gov.kw	2 March 2021 – 14 November 2021
Khalifa Musaed Hamada	Minister of State for Economic and Investment Affairs		2 March 2021 – 14 November 2021
Shaya Abdurrahman Ahmad Al-Shaya	Minister of State for Housing Affairs and Urban Development	www.pahw.gov.kw	2 March 2021 – 14 November 2021
Shaya Abdurrahman Ahmad Al-Shaya	Minister of State for Municipal Affairs	www.baladia.gov.kw	2 March 2021 – 14 November 2021
Mubarak Salem Al-Harees	Minister of State for National Assembly Affairs	www.mona.gov.kw	2 March 2021 – 14 November 2021
Abdurrahman Baddah Al-Mutairi	Minister of State for Youth Affairs	www.youth.gov.kw	2 March 2021 – 14 November 2021

== See also ==
- Cabinet of Kuwait
- 35th Cabinet of Kuwait
- 36th Cabinet of Kuwait
- 37th Cabinet of Kuwait
