= 34th Cabinet of Kuwait =

The Cabinet of Kuwait is the chief executive body of the State of Kuwait. The following cabinet is the 34th in the history of Kuwait. It was formed on 10 December 2016, after the previous Cabinet resigned on 28 November 2016. The Cabinet resigned on 30 October 2017.

Incumbent	Office	Website	Since
Jaber Al-Mubarak Al-Hamad Al-Sabah	Prime Minister	www.pm.gov.kw	4 December 2011 – 30 October 2017
Sabah Al-Khaled Al-Hamad Al-Sabah	First Deputy Prime Minister and Minister of Foreign Affairs	www.mofa.gov.kw	22 October 2011 – 30 October 2017
Mohammad Al-Khaled Al-Hamad Al-Sabah	Deputy Prime Minister and Minister of Defense	www.mod.gov.kw	10 December 2016 – 30 October 2017
Anas Nasser Al-Saleh	Deputy Prime Minister and Minister of Finance	www.mof.gov.kw	10 December 2016 – 30 October 2017
Khaled Al Jarrah Al Sabah	Deputy Prime Minister and Minister of Interior	www.moi.gov.kw	4 August 2013 – 30 October 2017
Mohammad Nasser Al-Jabri	Minister of Awqaf and Islamic Affairs	cms.islam.gov.kw	10 December 2016 – 30 October 2017
Khaled Nasser Abdullah Al-Roudan	Minister of Commerce and Industry	www.moci.gov.kw	10 December 2016 – 30 October 2017
Dr. Mohammad Abdulatif Al-Fares	Minister of Education	www.moe.edu.kw	10 December 2016 – 30 October 2017
Essam Abdulmohsen Al-Marzouq	Minister of Electricity and Water	www.mew.gov.kw	10 December 2016 – 30 October 2017
Jamal Mansour Al-Harbi	Minister of Health	www.moh.gov.kw	10 December 2016 – 30 October 2017
Dr. Mohammad Abdulatif Al-Fares	Minister of Higher Education	www.mohe.edu.kw	10 December 2016 – 30 October 2017
Salman Sabah Al-Salem Al-Humoud Al-Sabah	Minister of Information	www.cmgs.gov.kw	10 December 2016 – 30 October 2017
Dr. Faleh Abdullah Al-Azeb	Minister of Justice	www.moj.gov.kw	10 December 2016 – 30 October 2017
Essam Abdulmohsen Al-Marzouq	Minister of Oil	www.moo.gov.kw	10 December 2016 – 30 October 2017
Abdulrahman Abdulkareem Al-Mutawa'	Minister of Public Works	www.mpw.gov.kw	10 December 2016 – 30 October 2017
Hind Sabeeh Barak Al-Sabeeh	Minister of Social Affairs and Labor	www.mosal.gov.kw	10 December 2016 – 30 October 2017
Mohammad Al-Abdullah Al-Mubarak Al-Sabah	Minister of State for Cabinet Affairs	www.cmgs.gov.kw	10 December 2016 – 30 October 2017
Hind Sabeeh Barak Al-Sabeeh	Minister of State for Economic Affairs		10 December 2016 – 30 October 2017
Yaser Abul	Minister of State for Housing Affairs	www.housing.gov.kw	10 December 2016 – 30 October 2017
Mohammad Nasser Al-Jabri	Minister of State for Municipal Affairs	www.baladia.gov.kw	10 December 2016 – 30 October 2017
Dr. Faleh Abdullah Al-Azeb	Minister of State for National Assembly Affairs	www.mona.gov.kw	10 December 2016 – 30 October 2017
Yaser Abul	Minister of State for Utilities	www.moc.gov.kw	10 December 2016 – 30 October 2017
Salman Sabah Al-Salem Al-Humoud Al-Sabah	Minister of State for Youth Affairs	www.youth.gov.kw	10 December 2016 – 30 October 2017

== See also ==
- Cabinet of Kuwait
