= 35th Cabinet of Kuwait =

The Cabinet of Kuwait is the chief executive body of the State of Kuwait. The following cabinet is the 35th in the history of Kuwait. It was formed on 11 December 2017, after the previous Cabinet resigned on 30 October 2017. The last reshuffle took place on 25 December 2018. On 14 November 2019, the Prime Minister Sheikh Jaber Al-Mubarak Al-Hamed Al-Sabah tendered resignation of his cabinet to His Highness the Amir Sheikh Sabah Al-Ahmad Al-Jaber Al-Sabah.

Incumbent	Office	Website	Since
Jaber Al-Mubarak Al-Hamad Al-Sabah	Prime Minister	www.pm.gov.kw	4 December 2011 – 14 November 2019
Nasser Sabah Al-Ahmad Al-Sabah	First Deputy Prime Minister and Minister of Defense	www.mod.gov.kw	11 December 2017 – 14 November 2019
Sabah Al-Khaled Al-Hamad Al-Sabah	Deputy Prime Minister and Minister of Foreign Affairs	www.mofa.gov.kw	22 October 2011 – 14 November 2019
Khaled Al Jarrah Al Sabah	Deputy Prime Minister and Minister of Interior	www.moi.gov.kw	4 August 2013 – 14 November 2019
Anas Khalid Al Saleh	Deputy Prime Minister and Minister of State for Cabinet Affairs	www.cmgs.gov.kw	6 January 2014 – 14 November 2019
Fahd Mohammed Mohsen Al-Afasi; Fahad Ali Zaied Al-Shoula	Minister of Awqaf and Islamic Affairs	cms.islam.gov.kw	11 December 2017 – 24 December 2018; 25 December 2018 – 14 November 2019
Khalid Naser Al-Rodan	Minister of Commerce and Industry	www.moci.gov.kw	10 December 2016 – 14 November 2019
Hamed Mohammed Al-Aazmi	Minister of Education	www.moe.edu.kw	11 December 2017 – 14 November 2019
Bakheet Shibeeb Al-Rasheedi; Khalid Ali Mohammad Al-Fadel	Minister of Electricity and Water	www.mew.gov.kw	11 December 2017 – 24 December 2018; 25 December 2018 – 14 November 2019
Nayef Falah Al-Hajraf; Mariam Eqeal Al-Saied Hashem Al-Aqeal (Acting)	Minister of Finance	www.mof.gov.kw	11 December 2017 – 5 November 2019; 6 November 2019 – 14 November 2019
Basel Hamoud Al-Hamad Al-Sabah	Minister of Health	www.moh.gov.kw	11 December 2017 – 14 November 2019
Hamed Mohammed Al-Aazmi	Minister of Higher Education	www.mohe.edu.kw	11 December 2017 – 14 November 2019
Mohammad Nasir Al-Jabri	Minister of Information	www.cmgs.gov.kw	11 December 2017 – 14 November 2019
Fahd Mohammed Mohsen Al-Afasi	Minister of Justice	www.moj.gov.kw	11 December 2017 – 14 November 2019
Khalid Ali Mohammad Al-Fadel	Minister of Oil	www.moo.gov.kw	25 December 2018 – 14 November 2019
Hussam Abdullah Al-Roumi; Jenan Mohsen Hassan Ramadan	Minister of Public Works	www.mpw.gov.kw	11 December 2017 – 24 December 2018; 25 December 2018 – 14 November 2019
Hind Sabeeh Barak Al-Sabeeh; Saad Ebrahim Saad Al-Kharaz	Minister of Social Affairs and Labor	www.mosal.gov.kw	11 December 2017 – 24 December 2018; 25 December 2018 – 14 November 2019
Hind Sabeeh Barak Al-Sabeeh; Mariam Eqeal Al-Saied Hashem Al-Aqeal	Minister of State for Economic Affairs		11 December 2017 – 24 December 2018; 25 December 2018 – 14 November 2019
Jenan Mohsen Hassan Ramadan	Minister of State for Housing Affairs	www.housing.gov.kw	11 December 2017 – 14 November 2019
Hussam Abdullah Al-Roumi; Fahad Ali Zaied Al-Shoula	Minister of State for Municipal Affairs	www.baladia.gov.kw	11 December 2017 – 24 December 2018; 25 December 2018 – 14 November 2019
Adel Musaed Al-Kharafi; Fahd Mohammed Mohsen Al-Afasi	Minister of State for National Assembly Affairs	www.mona.gov.kw	11 December 2017 – 24 December 2018; 25 December 2018 – 14 November 2019
Jenan Mohsen Hassan Ramadan; Khalid Naser Al-Rodan	Minister of State for Services Affairs	www.moc.gov.kw	11 December 2017 – 24 December 2018; 25 December 2018 – 14 November 2019
Khalid Naser Al-Rodan; Mohammad Nasir Abdullah Al-Jabri	Minister of State for Youth Affairs	www.youth.gov.kw	11 December 2017 – 25 March 2018; 26 March 2018 – 14 November 2019

== See also ==
- Cabinet of Kuwait
