= List of banks in Kuwait =

This is a list of banks in Kuwait. All the following 11 local and 11 foreign banks are registered with Kuwait Banking Association. The Central Bank of Kuwait supervises the 32 Exchange Companies that operate within Kuwait.

== Central Bank ==
- Central Bank of Kuwait (CBK)

== Local Banks ==
=== Conventional Banks ===
- National Bank of Kuwait (K.S.C) (NBK)
- Commercial Bank of Kuwait (K.S.C)(Al-Tijari CBK)
- Gulf Bank (K.S.C) (GBK)
- Al Ahli Bank of Kuwait (K.S.C.P.) (ABK)
- Burgan Bank (K.S.C) (Burgan)

=== Islamic Banks ===
- Warba Bank (K.S.C) (Warba Bank) – registered as an Islamic bank by the Central Bank of Kuwait in 2010.
- Kuwait Finance House (KFH)
- Boubyan Bank (K.S.C) (Boubyan)
- Al Ahli United Bank (AUB) - February 2024 - AUBK merged with Kuwait Finance House (KFH). Officially removed from Islamic Bank list on 20 October 2024.
- Kuwait International Bank (K.S.C) (KIB)

=== Specialized Bank ===
- The Industrial Bank of Kuwait (K.S.C) (IBK)

== Foreign Banks ==
- Bank of Bahrain and Kuwait (B.S.C) (BBK)
- Banque Nationale de Paris (BNP) and Paribas
- HongKong and Shanghai Banking Corporation Bank Middle East Limited (HSBC Middle East)
- First Abu Dhabi Bank (FAB Kuwait)
- Citibank N.A. Kuwait (Subsidiary of Citibank Europe, Middle East & Africa)
- Qatar National Bank (Q.P.S.C) (QNB)
- Mashreq Bank P.S.C (Mashreq)
- Al Rajhi Banking & Investment Corporation (Rajhi)
- Bank Muscat
- Industrial and Commercial Bank of China Limited (ICBC)

== See also ==
- List of banks in the Arab world
