= Bader Al-Kharafi =

Kuwaiti businessman (born 1977)

- بدر ناصر الخرافي
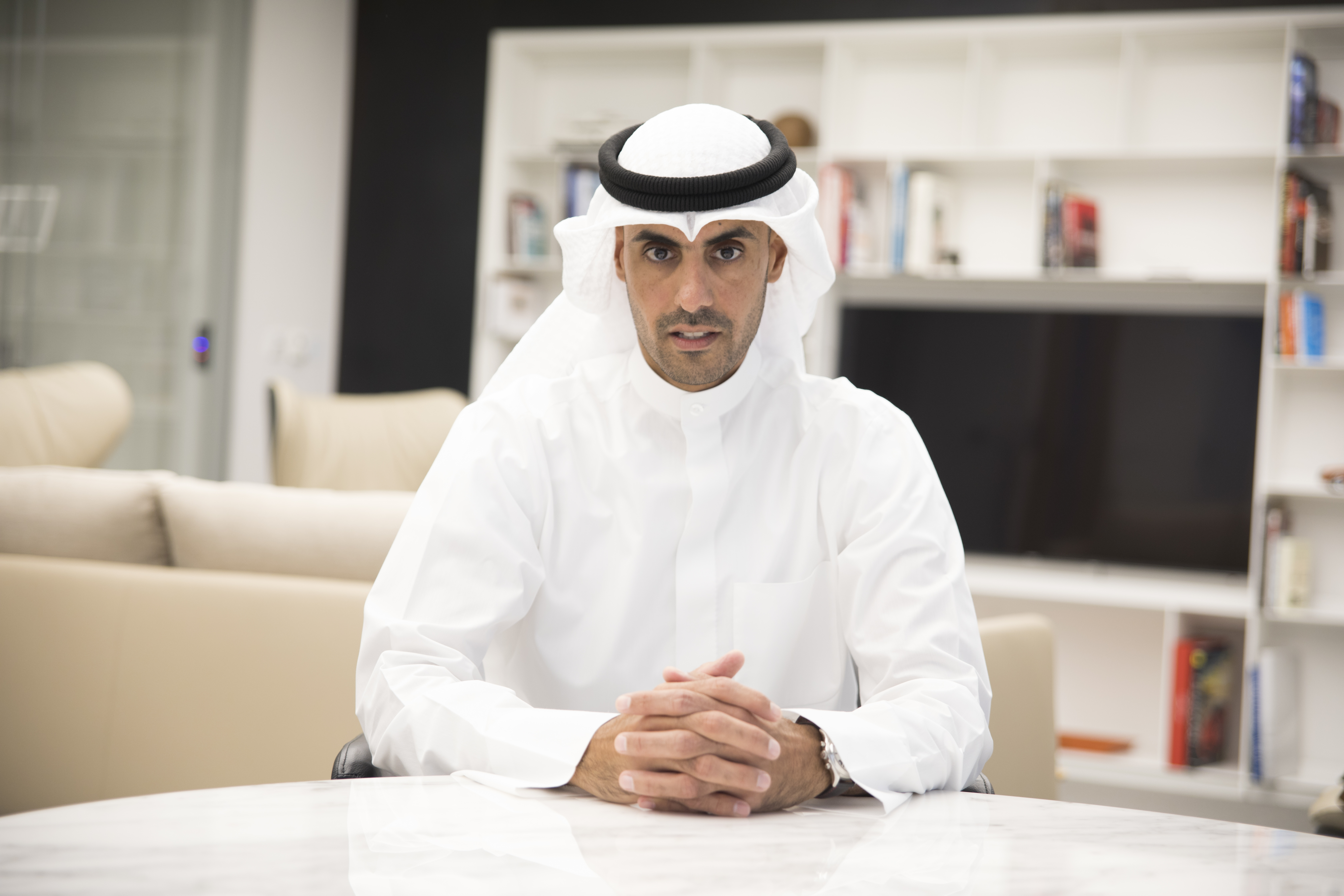
- Al-Kharafi in 2017
- Born: Bader Nasser Al-Kharafi; 17 August 1977 (age 49); United Kingdom
- Education: Kuwait University, London Business School
- Occupation: Businessman
- Children: 2
- Father: Nasser Al-Kharafi

Bader Nasser Al-Kharafi (Arabic: بدر ناصر الخرافي; born 17 August 1977) is a Kuwaiti businessman. He holds the positions of Vice Chairman and Group Chief Executive Officer at Zain Group, a telecommunications company based in Kuwait.

In 2018, Al-Kharafi was ranked as one of the 100 most influential Arabs list by Arabian Business.

== Early life and education ==
Al-Kharafi was born on 17 August 1977. He received his bachelor's degree in mechanical engineering from Kuwait University in 2002. In 2016, he completed his MBA from London Business School.

== Career ==
After graduation, Al-Kharafi joined Kuwait Petroleum Corporation (KPC). He joined M.A & Al-Kharafi group in 2002 and started working as a Coordination Engineer. He currently holds senior management positions at Gulf Bank of Kuwait, Foulath Holding, Diamond International Motors, and Gulf Cable & Electrical Industries.

After the death of his father, Nasser Al-Kharafi, Al-Kharafi assumed the directorship of the Al Kharafi groups' executive committee in 2012.

In early 2014, he joined the Middle East Advisory Board of Coutts. In the same year, Zain KSA, a subsidiary of Zain Group appointed Al-Kharafi as its Vice Chairman.

In 2017, Al-Kharafi became the CEO of Zain Group, replacing the Scott Gegenheimer.

In February 2019, he became the Chairman of the Board of the Executive Committee and a member of the Board of Nomination and Remuneration Committee of Boursa Kuwait, the country's stock exchange.

In September 2019, BNK Automotive, owned by Al-Kharafi, entered into a new agency agreement with Volvo, making it the exclusive importer of Volvo Cars in Kuwait. In November 2019, Al-Kharafi acquired a controlling interest in Gulf Cable, securing 29 percent of the company's shares in a deal valued at approximately US$500 million.

== Awards and recognition ==
- In 2014, Al-Kharafi has been featured in the World's 100 Most Powerful Arabs 2014 by Gulf Business.
- In 2015, Al-Kharafi ranked as one of the Most Powerful Young Arabs Under 40 in Arabian Business.
- In 2017 and 2018, Al-Kharafi was listed in the 100 World's Most Influential Arabs feature by Arabian Business.

== Philanthropy ==
Al-Kharafi is associated with Kuwait Food Bank which is involved in providing nutritious meals to the poor in Kuwait and creating public awareness on lessening food waste. More than 5,700 Kuwaiti families are said to have benefited from this initiative. The food bank also provides skills and training to the members of poor families so that they can find decent employment in Kuwait.

Al-Kharafi offers support and guidance to Kuwaiti youth through INJAZ Kuwait. Additionally, he established We Able in the year 2019, a disability inclusion program which aimed to position Zain Group as disbility inclusive.
