= CBK =

CBK could refer to:

- CBK (AM), a radio station in Watrous, Saskatchewan, Canada
- Central Bank of Kenya
- Central Bank of Kuwait
- Commercial Bank of Kuwait
- CISSP Common Body of Knowledge, a collection of topics relevant to information security professionals around the world
- Comeback Kid (band), a Canadian band
- Chandrika Bandaranaike Kumaratunga, former president of Sri Lanka
- CBK, ISO 639-3 language code for Chavacano
- CBK, NYSE symbol for clothing retailer Christopher & Banks
- College basketball
- Carolyn Bessette-Kennedy (1966-1999), American fashion publicist and wife of John F. Kennedy Jr.
