= Kuwait International Bank =

Bank of Kuwait

- Native name: Kuwait International Bank K.S.C.P.
- Traded as: KSE: KIB
- ISIN: KW0EQ0100069
- Industry: Financial services
- Founded: 1973
- Headquarters: West Tower, Joint Banking Center, Safat, Kuwait City, Kuwait
- Website: www.kib.com.kw

Kuwait International Bank (KIB) is an Islamic bank located in Kuwait City, founded in 1973. It offers various Islamic banking and finance services for individuals and corporate customers.

It is a specialised bank regulated by the Central Bank of Kuwait and listed on the Kuwait Stock Exchange.

== History ==
KIB was incorporated in 1973 under the name Kuwait Real Estate Bank, with an initial focus on real‑estate‑related financing activities. The bank was listed on the Kuwait Stock Exchange in 1984. In 2007, the bank completed a strategic transition to operate in full compliance with Islamic Sharia principles, adopting its current name, Kuwait International Bank. Following this transition, KIB expanded its scope to offer a broader range of Sharia‑compliant banking and financial services while remaining regulated by the Central Bank of Kuwait.

== See also ==
- List of banks in Kuwait
