= Imad Mohammad Alatiqi =

Kuwaiti politician (1956–2025)

Imad Mohammad Alatiqi (Arabic: عماد محمد العتيقي; 1956 – 11 September 2025) was a Kuwaiti politician who served as Deputy Prime Minister and Minister of Oil, as well as an influential oil expert, researcher and academic who made significant contributions to the fields of petroleum research studies and oil policy-making in Kuwait through various leadership positions and membership in the Supreme Petroleum Council (SPC) of Kuwait.

Alatiqi played a key role in rebuilding Kuwait’s academic infrastructure after the end of the Gulf War, initiating several funding programs to reestablish major research facilities and projects at Kuwait University that were discontinued during the devastation of the war. He was also responsible for the establishment of several private universities in Kuwait for which quality assurance and accreditation systems based on international standards were implemented under his guidance.

Alatiqi contributed widely to the fields of academic and scientific research. He authored and co-authored over a hundred research articles, technical reports, and conference presentations. His research interests included process control, petroleum refining, petrochemical processes, and industrial economics. He was also a chartered market analyst; hence his analyses of the oil market were followed closely by local and international news agencies alike.

== Education and early career ==
Alatiqi started his career as a chemical engineer after graduating from Alexandria University in Alexandria, Egypt with a bachelor's degree in chemical engineering. In 1978, he obtained a scholarship from Kuwait University for post-graduate studies in chemical engineering, which he completed at Lehigh University in Pennsylvania, USA, where he obtained master’s and doctoral degrees in chemical engineering.

Upon finishing his PhD in 1985, Alatiqi was appointed an assistant professor at Kuwait University, where he remained for three years before becoming Director of the Petroleum, Petrochemicals & Materials Division at the Kuwait Institute for Scientific Research, a position he held from 1988 until 1991. During this period, several service and research contracts were executed with leading companies like Kuwait Oil Company (KOC), Kuwait National Petroleum Company (KNPC), and Abu Dhabi Petroleum Company.

=== Membership in the Supreme Petroleum Council (SPC) (1990–2013) ===
On 14 May 1990, Alatiqi was appointed a member of the Supreme Petroleum Council (SPC), a post that he retained until 2013. Through the SPC, he played a prominent role in forming the policies and strategies of the Kuwait oil sector as Chairman of the Strategies and Organizational Structure Committee, Member of the Technical Economics Committee, and Chairman of the Combined Committee. Major achievements during this period included the approval of a strategic crude oil target plan, a refinery clean fuel project, a heavy oil project, and the establishment of the Al Zour Refinery Complex, all of which were successfully implemented.

=== Kuwait University (1991–2003) ===
After Kuwait’s liberation from the 1990 Iraqi invasion that marked the start of the Gulf War, Alatiqi returned to Kuwait University on 1 June 1991 to find that the university’s infrastructure had been devastated during the war, with its laboratories and other research facilities devoid of equipment. Upon being appointed Director of the Research Administration (Assistant Vice-Rector for Research), a post he held until 1994, Alatiqi initiated several funding programs to reestablish major research facilities and projects, mainly in the colleges of science, engineering, and medicine.

His next administrative appointment at the university was Dean of the College of Engineering and Petroleum from 1998 to 2000, where he initiated the concept of outcome evaluation through measurement of performance indicators with marked improvements in administrative processes. This and other leadership initiatives led to his placement in the Barrons 500 international list of “Leaders for the New Century.”

=== Private Universities Council (PUC) (2001–2010) ===
In 2001, Alatiqi was appointed a member of the Private Universities Council (PUC) to oversee and govern the establishment of private universities and colleges in Kuwait. Thereafter, he was appointed Secretary General of the PUC, a post he held from 11 November 2003 until 18 September 2010. During this tenure, he oversaw the establishment of several universities that are still in existence and initiated quality assurance and accreditation systems for them based on international standards. The accreditation system developed under his guidance gained international recognition as an innovative system. In the same capacity, Alatiqi initiated, negotiated, and secured funding for an internal scholarship program for private university students, a scheme that supported thousands of them.

=== American University of the Middle East (AUM) (2011–2019) ===
At the start of 2011, Alatiqi was appointed president of the American University of the Middle East (AUM) in Kuwait, a position he held till January 2019. The university made considerable progress under his leadership and grew from an initial student body of around 1,000 students to 9,000, expanded its programs and facilities, and eventually attained full accreditation. The university was also classified as the leading local university in international rankings.

== Death ==
Alatiqi died on 11 September 2025, at the age of 69.
