= Industrial Bank of Kuwait =

Financial institution in Kuwait

- Company type: Private
- Industry: Banking
- Founded: 1973; 53 years ago
- Headquarters: Kuwait City, Kuwait
- Key people: Ali A. Khajah (CEO)

The Industrial Bank of Kuwait (IBK) was established in 1973 in the Kuwait through a government initiative. It specializes in providing financial support for the Kuwaiti industrial sector.

== History ==
It was founded by the government of Kuwait in partnership with private sector institutions to support the country's development and enhance the international competitiveness of Kuwaiti companies. In its initial phase, being the first bank in the Gulf Cooperation Council region to specialize in industrial development, IBK's main focus was to provide medium to long-term financing for industrial projects. Currently, majority of the bank’s shares are owned by the public authorities, including the Ministry of Finance, the Central Bank of Kuwait, and the Public Institution of Social Security.

== Financial performance ==
As of 2024, the bank’s capital stands at KWD 20 million.

== See also ==
- List of banks in Kuwait
- List of national development banks
