= Salem Abdulaziz Al Sabah =

Kuwaiti royal and politician (born 1951)

Deputy Prime Minister and Minister of Finance
- In office: 4 August 2013 – January 2014
- Predecessor: Mustafa Al Shamali (as finance minister)
- Successor: Anas Khalid Al Saleh
- Monarch: Sheikh Sabah Al Sabah

Governor of Central Bank of Kuwait
- In office: September 1986 – February 2012
- Predecessor: Abdulwahab Ali Al Tammar
- Successor: Mohammad Al Hashel
- Monarch: Sheikh Sabah Al Sabah
- Born: 1 November 1951 (age 74)
Names
- Salem Abdulaziz Al Saud Al Sabah
- House: House of Sabah
- Education: American University of Beirut

Salem Abdulaziz Al Sabah (Arabic: سالم عبدالعزيز الصباح; born 1 November 1951) is a Kuwaiti economist and politician. A member of the ruling Al Sabah family, he served as deputy prime minister and minister of finance from 4 August 2013 to January 2014.

== Education ==
Al Sabah was born on 1 November 1951. He graduated from the American University of Beirut in 1977 receiving a degree in economics.

== Career ==
Following his graduation Al Sabah started his career at the Central Bank of Kuwait in 1977 and served in various posts. He was appointed governor of the Central Bank of Kuwait in September 1986 when Abdulwahab Ali Al Tammar resigned from the post. Al Sabah's tenure ended in February 2012. During his tenure he adopted reformist policies, and held the following positions: chair of Institute of Banking Studies, deputy governor at the Arab Monetary Fund and board member of Kuwait Investment Authority. In addition, he served as a member of the Kuala Lumpur-based Islamic Financial Services Board. He resigned from the governorship of the Central Bank after criticizing the Kuwaiti government's spending policies. Mohammad Al Hashel succeeded him as governor in March 2012.

On 4 August 2013, Al Sabah was appointed both deputy prime minister and finance minister. He replaced Mustafa Al Shamali as finance minister. As finance minister, Al Sabah also headed the Kuwait Investment Authority.

In October 2013, Al Sabah publicly stated that the economy of Kuwait could grow only if administrative reforms were realized. His tenure ended in January 2014 when Anas Khalid Al Saleh was appointed finance minister.
