= Faiza Al-Kharafi =

Kuwaiti chemist (born 1946)

- فايزة الخرافي
- Born: 1946 (age 79–80); Kuwait
- Education: Al Merkab High School; Ain Shams University; Kuwait University
- Spouse: Ali Mohammed Thanian Al-Ghanim
- Children: 5, including Marzouq Al-Ghanim
- Relatives: Nasser Al-Kharafi (brother); Jassem Al-Kharafi (brother); Fawzi Al-Kharafi (brother)
- Scientific career
- Fields: Electrochemistry, corrosion engineering

Faiza Mohammed Al-Kharafi (Arabic: فايزة الخرافي, romanized: Fāyzah al-Kharāfī; born 1946) is a Kuwaiti chemist and academic. She was the president of Kuwait University from 1993 to 2002, and the first woman to head a major university in the Middle East. She is the vice president of the World Academy of Sciences.

== Early life and education ==
Faiza Al-Kharafi was born to a wealthy family in Kuwait in 1946 and developed an interest in science from a young age. She attended Al Merkab High School. She received her BSc from Ain Shams University in Cairo in 1967. She then attended Kuwait University where she founded the Corrosion and Electrochemistry Research Laboratory while in graduate school. She received her master's in 1972 and her PhD in 1975.

== Career ==
Al-Kharafi worked in Kuwait University's Department of Chemistry from 1975 to 1981. In 1984 she became chair of the department and was Dean of the Faculty of Science from 1986 to 1989. She became a professor of chemistry at Kuwait University in 1987. On 5 July 1993, Emir Jaber Al-Ahmad Al-Jaber Al-Sabah issued a decree appointing Al-Kharafi as rector of the university, and she became the first woman to head a major university in the Middle East. Al-Kharafi helped reconstruct Kuwait University after the First Gulf War, which ended in 1991. She was president from 1993 to 2002, where she oversaw 1,500 staff members, over 5,000 employees, and over 20,000 students.

Al- Kharafi has demonstrated to be an advocate for research in Kuwait. In 1986, Al- Kharafi and her colleagues explored and compared the rich development of Kuwaiti scientific research in comparison to other nations in the third world. In her publication, Al- Kharafi was able to demonstrate the ability of Kuwait's higher education institutions to engage in relevant scientific research.

Al-Kharafi has studied the impact of corrosion on engine cooling systems, distillation units for crude oil, high temperature geothermal brines, and tap water. She has also studied corrosion in polluted water and metal corrosion caused by pollution. As an electrochemist, she studied the electrochemical behavior of metals and metal alloys including aluminum, copper, platinum, niobium, vanadium, cadmium, brass, cobalt, and low carbon steel. She collaborated on the discovery of a class of molybdenum-based catalysts that improve gasoline octane without benzene by-products.

She joined the Board of the United Nations University in 1998. Following the passage of women's suffrage in Kuwait in 2005, she said "when we have political rights, we can express our opinion and vote for the correct person... This gives us the chance to express our ideas." In 2006, she helped found the American Bilingual School in Kuwait. She is the vice president of The World Academy of Sciences. She is on many boards, including the Kuwait Foundation for the Advancement Sciences, Alqabas, the Kuwait-MIT Center for Natural Resources and the Environment.

== Awards and honours ==
Forbes magazine named her as one of "The 100 Most Powerful Women – Women To Watch in the Middle East" in 2005. She received the Kuwait Prize in Applied Sciences in 2006. The Council for Gulf Relations named her Top Gulf Woman of the Year in 2008. In 2011, she was the recipient of the L'Oréal-UNESCO Award for Women in Science for her work on corrosion.

== Personal life ==
Al-Kharafi is married to Ali Mohammed Thanian Al-Ghanim and has five sons and ten grandchildren. Of her sons, Marzouq Al-Ghanim is a former speaker of Kuwait National Assembly. She spends her Summers at Lake Geneva, Switzerland. Her brothers are Jassem Al-Kharafi, former speaker of the Kuwaiti National Assembly, and the late Nasser Al-Kharafi. She shares in the family fortune from M. A. Kharafi & Sons.

== See also ==
- Women in chemistry

== Works ==
- Al-Kharafi, Faiza (1983). Al Saratan Aw Al Khelyat Al Moutamarida [Cancer or Rebellious Cells].
- Al-Kharafi, Faiza (1986). Al Hareb Al Kimaeya [Chemical War].
- Abdullah, Aboubakr M.; Al-Kharafi, Faiza M.; Ateya, Badr G. (May 2006). "Intergranular corrosion of copper in the presence of benzotriazole". Scripta Materialia. 54 (9): 1673–1677. doi:10.1016/j.scriptamat.2006.01.014.
- Makhseed, Saad; Al-Kharafi, Faiza; Samuel, Jacob; Ateya, Badr (25 April 2009). "Catalytic oxidation of sulphide ions using a novel microporous cobalt phthalocyanine network polymer in aqueous solution". Catalysis Communications. 10 (9): 1284–1287. doi:10.1016/j.catcom.2009.01.034.
