= Zain Group =

Kuwaiti telecommunications company

Mobile Telecommunications Company K.S.C.P.
- Zain Group's logo used since 2019
- Formerly: MTC (1983–2006)
- Type: Public
- Traded as: KSE:ZAIN
- ISIN: KW0EQ0601058
- Industry: Telecommunications
- Founded: 22 June 1983; 43 years ago
- Founder: Nasser Al-Kharafi
- Headquarters: Kuwait City, Kuwait
- Area served: 8 countries in the Middle East & North Africa
- Key people: Osamah Othman Alfuraih (Chairman); Bader Nasser Al-Kharafi (Vice-Chairman and Group CEO); Nawaf Hisham Al-Gharabally (CEO of Zain Kuwait)
- Products: Premium messages
- Revenue: ▲US$7.44 billion (FY -2025) main source:premium messages
- Net income: ▲US$777 million (FY 2025)
- Number of employees: 8,000+ (as of 31 December 2025)
- Website: zain.com/en

Mobile Telecommunications Company K.S.C.P. (doing business as Zain) (زين [zeːn]) is a Kuwaiti mobile telecommunications company founded on 22 June 1983 in Kuwait as MTC (an abbreviation for its predecessor's former name, the Mobile Telecommunications Company), and later rebranded as Zain in 2007. Zain has a commercial presence in eight countries across the Middle East with 50.9 million active customers as of 31 December 2025. The Vice Chairman and Group CEO is Bader Nasser Al-Kharafi, who was appointed in March 2017.

As of 2024, the two major stakeholders are Kuwait Investment Authority with 15.9% and Omantel with 21.9%.

The Zain brand is one of the most recognized telecom brands across the MENA region, with a brand value of US$3.5 billion (2025).

Zain Group was ranked 35th on Forbes Middle East's Top 100 Listed Companies 2025 list.

== History ==
It was founded on 22 June 1983 in Kuwait as MTC (an abbreviation for its predecessor's former name, the Mobile Telecommunications Company), and later rebranded as Zain in 2007. Zain is listed on the Kuwait Stock Exchange.

For FY-2025, Zain Group generated consolidated revenue of KD 2.3 billion (US$7.44 billion), up 14% YoY. Consolidated EBITDA for the period reached KD 780 million (US$2.54 billion), with EBITDA growth of 11%, reflecting an EBITDA margin of 34%. Consolidated net income reached KD 239 million (US$777 million), up 103% YoY. Earnings per share amounted to 55 fils (US$0.18)

== Operations ==
Zain has presence in a number of countries.

Country	Site	Remarks
Bahrain	bh.zain.com	Zain started operations in the Kingdom of Bahrain on 14 August 2003 as MTC-Vodafone. Since then, it has introduced 5G services to the country. Zain's 4G and 5G network covers 100% of the Bahrain's Bahraini population.
Iraq	iq.zain.com	Zain has provided mobile services in Iraq since December 2003. After securing a license in August 2007, Zain Iraq acquired Iraqna's network, becoming the largest mobile operator in Iraq with 20.4 million customers.The operator provides 4.5G LTE services across Iraq.
Jordan	jo.zain.com	In 1994, Zain in Jordan, formerly Fastlink, was the first to introduce mobile services in the country. In 2003, it was the first to join what is now the Zain Group's Middle East portfolio. it now offers 4.5G LTE and 5G services across the Kingdom serving 4.3 million customers.
Kuwait	kw.zain.com	Zain in Kuwait is the group's flagship operation, which was established in 1983 and in 1994 became the first telecom operator to launch commercial GSM services in the region and now offers nationwide 5G and 5G Advanced services, covering 100% of populated areas with 5G services.
Morocco	inwi.ma	On 14 March 2009, Zain in a 50/50 partnership with Al Ajial Investment Fund Holding acquired 31% of Wana Corporate SA INWI (formerly known as Wana) in Morocco.
Palestine*	jawwal.ps*	Zain is set to acquire Jawwal, which is operated by Paltel.*
Saudi Arabia	sa.zain.com	Zain launched its commercial operations in the Kingdom of Saudi Arabia on 26 August 2008, a year after it was awarded its mobile license. The group holds management control of the operation and has a 37% ownership stake. Zain Saudi Arabia offers nationwide 4.5G LTE and 5G services. In October 2019, Zain KSA launched 5G commercial services in what was then the largest 5G rollout in Europe, Middle East and Africa and 3rd largest globally.
South Sudan	ss.zain.com	Zain is a dominant operator in South Sudan.
Sudan	sd.zain.com	In February 2006, Zain acquired the remaining 61% stake of Mobitel, Sudan's first mobile operator, in a deal valued at $1.332 billion, resulting in 100% ownership. The company was rebranded to Zain in September 2007 Zain Sudan. The operation offers 4G services in major cities across the country.
Syria*	mtnsyr.com*	Zain is set to acquire MTN Syria, which is operated by TeleInvest Ltd, subsidiary of Dallah Al-Baraka (formerly by MTN), launching Zain Syria.*

== Presence in Africa (2005–2010) ==
From 2005 to 2010, Zain maintained a presence in a number of countries in Sub-Saharan Africa, in addition to its core market in the MENA region.

Zain entered Africa in May 2005 through the $3.4 billion purchase of Celtel International which had 13 country operations in Africa, serving five million customers at that time. Zain invested heavily across the continent through network upgrades and acquiring two more country licences. By June 2010, Zain had over 40 million customers across the continent, operating in Burkina Faso, Chad, Democratic Republic of the Congo, Gabon, Ghana, Kenya, Madagascar, Malawi, Niger, Nigeria, Sierra Leone, Tanzania, Uganda and Zambia.

In early 2010, Zain accepted an offer for the sale of all its Africa operations. On 8 June 2010, Zain announced that it had satisfied all required conditions precedent to closing of the sale of 100% of Zain Africa BV to Bharti Airtel Limited for $10.7 billion on an enterprise basis.

Today, Zain operates on the African continent only in Sudan, South Sudan and Morocco.

== See also ==
- Celtel
