= Jassem Al-Kharafi =

Former Kuwaiti Speaker of Parliament

Jassem al-Kharafi
- جاسم محمد عبدالمحسن الخرافي
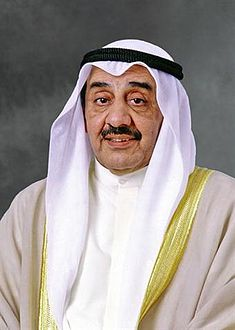

Speaker of the Kuwait National Assembly
- In office June 20, 2012 – October 7, 2012
- Preceded by: Ahmed al-Sadoun
- Succeeded by: Ali al-Rashid
- In office July 17, 1999 – December 6, 2011
- Preceded by: Ahmed al-Sadoun
- Succeeded by: Ahmed al-Sadoun

Minister of Finance
- In office March 3, 1985 – June 12, 1990
- Preceded by: Ali Al-Khalifa Al-Sabah
- Succeeded by: Nasser Abdullah Al-Roudhan

Personal details
- Born: 1940 Kuwait City, Kuwait
- Died: May 21, 2015 (age 75)
- Relations: Nasser al-Kharafi (brother); Faiza al-Kharafi (sister); Fawzi al-Kharafi (brother); Marzouq al-Ghanim (nephew)
- Children: 6
- Parent: Mohammed al-Kharafi

Jassem Al-Kharafi, (Arabic: جاسم محمد عبدالمحسن الخرافي; 1940 – May 21, 2015) was a Kuwaiti oligarch who was the speaker of the Kuwaiti National Assembly from 1999 to 2011. In his capacity as Speaker in 2006, Al-Kharafi played a critical role in the ascension of Sheikh Sabah Al-Ahmad Al-Sabah to the emirship of Kuwait by coordinating a no-confidence vote of the incumbent emir, Sheikh Saad Al-Abdullah Al-Sabah. During the reign of Sheikh Sabah Al-Ahmad Al-Sabah, his family conglomerate, M.A. Kharafi & Sons, dominated several sectors of the Kuwaiti economy, including construction, telecommunications and investment.

== Early life and career ==
Jassem al-Kharafi was born in Kuwait City in 1940, the son of Mohammed Abdulmohsen al-Kharafi, the founder of M. A. Kharafi & Sons. Al-Kharafi studied Business Administration at the Manchester Trade Faculty in Kuwait and was director of M. A. Kharafi & Sons before being elected to the National Assembly in 1975. He was the Minister of Finance from 1985 to 1990.

== Political positions ==
=== Views on Iran ===
On July 13, 2008, Al-Kharafi publicly accused the West of provoking Iran on the nuclear issue. In his interview with state-owned Kuwait TV, Al-Kharafi said, "What is happening is that there are provocative Western statements, and Iran responds in the same way... I believe that a matter this sensitive needs dialogue not escalation, and it shouldn't be dealt with as if Iran were one of America's states."

=== Israeli attacks on Lebanon ===
In July 2006, he vigorously denounced the Israeli attacks on Lebanon saying that the war would "turn us all into terrorists".

== Speaker of Kuwaiti National Assembly ==
Al-Kharafi was elected Speaker of the National Assembly in 1999. He served as Speaker for five terms, the most in Kuwait's history, until deciding that he would not stand for reelection in the 2012 National Assembly elections.

== Family ==
His brother Nasser ran M. A. Kharafi & Sons, and was listed by Forbes as one of the richest people in the world. His sister, Faiza, was rector of Kuwait University. The University of Tirana on 7 October 2011 awarded him an Honoris Causa title.

Political offices
Preceded by Ahmed Al-Sadoun	Speaker of National Assembly of Kuwait; 1999–2012	Succeeded by Ahmed Al-Sadoun
