= Souk Al-Manakh stock market crash =

1982 market crash in Kuwait

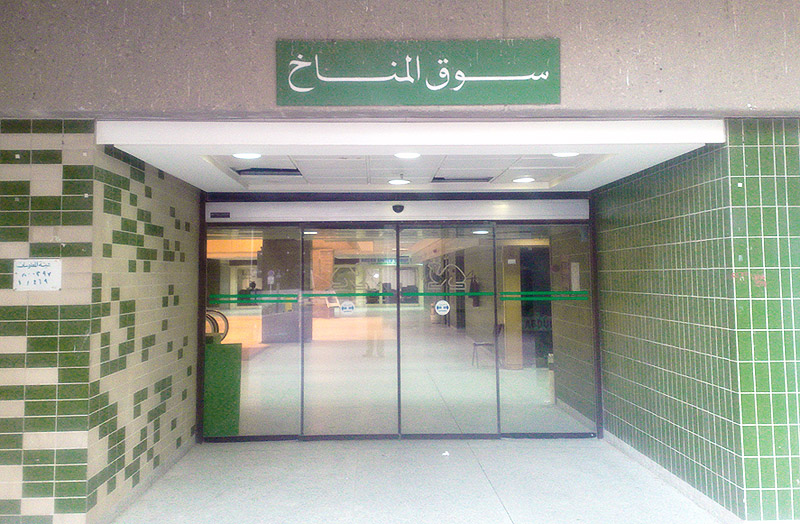
- Type: Stock exchange
- Location: Kuwait City, Kuwait

The Souk Al-Manakh stock market crash was the 1982 stock market crash of Kuwait's unofficial stock market, the Souk Al-Manakh (Arabic: سوق المناخ). The Al-Manakh market was housed in an air-conditioned parking garage in the historic area of Jibla, Kuwait City. The market was specialized in highly speculative and unregulated non-Kuwaiti companies. At its peak, its market capitalization was the third highest in the world, behind only the U.S. and Japan, and ahead of the U.K. and France.

== Background ==
The large oil revenues of the 1970s left many private individuals with substantial funds at their disposal. These funds prompted a speculation boom in the official stock market in the mid-1970s that culminated in a crash in 1977. The government's response to this crash was to bail out the affected investors and to introduce stricter regulations. This response unintentionally contributed to the far larger stock market crash of the 1980s by driving the least risk-averse speculators into the technically illegal alternate market, the Souk Al-Manakh. The Souk Al-Manakh had emerged parallel to the official stock market, which was dominated by several older wealthy families who traded, largely among themselves, in very large blocks of stock. The Souk Al-Manakh soon became the market for the new investors and, in the end, for many old investors as well.

By 1979, the year Souk Al-Manakh was established, Kuwait already had a robust financial sector and more stocks than any other Gulf country. However, due to the crash of 1977 and the following strict regulations for enlisting and trading companies, some Kuwaiti businessmen went on to found companies in nearby Gulf countries and list them on this new non-official market. After a couple of years, this lucrative unregulated market attracted many investors and had 70 enlisted companies, including around 40 companies based in other Gulf countries. The next year, the market capitalization of all shares jumped in a few months from $5 billion to $100 billion.

== Crash ==
Share dealings using postdated checks created a huge unregulated expansion of credit. The crash of the unofficial stock market finally came in August 1982, when a dealer presented a postdated check from a young Passport Office employee for payment and it bounced. By September 1982, the Kuwaiti Ministry of Finance ordered all dubious checks to be turned in for clearance, and shut down the Souk Al-Manakh. The official investigation summed the value of worthless outstanding checks at the equivalent of US$94 billion from about 6,000 investors. Kuwait's financial sector was badly shaken by the crash, as was the entire economy.

The crash prompted a recession that rippled through society as individual families were disrupted by the investment risks of particular members made on family credit. The debts from the crash left all but one bank in Kuwait technically insolvent, held up only by support from the Central Bank. Only the National Bank of Kuwait, the largest commercial bank, survived the crisis intact. In the end, the government stepped in, devising a complicated set of policies, embodied in the Difficult Credit Facilities Resettlement Program. The implementation of the program was still incomplete in 1990 when the Iraqi invasion changed the entire financial picture.

== Effects ==
Coupled with reduced oil revenues caused by the ongoing Iran–Iraq War, the Souk Al-Manakh crash helped to push the entire Gulf region into a recession.

== Popular culture ==
The crash was depicted in the 1983 play Fursan Al-Manakh (The Knights of Al-Manakh) starring Abdulhussain Abdulredha.

== General and cited references ==
- Library of Congress Country Studies - Kuwait
- A detailed description of the Kuwait stock market crash from stock-market-crash.net
- Darwiche, Fadwa Adel (1986). The Gulf Stock Exchange Crash: The Rise and Fall of the Souq Al-Manakh. London: Croom Helm. ISBN 0-7099-4534-5. OCLC 13423627.
