= Hani Abdulaziz Al Hussein =

Kuwaiti engineer and politician

Minister of Oil
- In office 14 February 2012 – 26 May 2013
- Prime Minister: Jaber Al Sabah
- Preceded by: Mohammad Busairi
- Succeeded by: Mustafa Al Shamali

Chief Executive Officer of Kuwait Petroleum Corporation
- In office 2004–2007

Personal details
- Education: University of Tulsa

Hani Abdulaziz Al Hussein is a Kuwaiti engineer and politician. He was chief executive officer of the Kuwait Petroleum Corporation from 2004 to 2007 and oil minister from February 2012 to May 2013.

== Education ==
Hussein received a bachelor's degree in chemical engineering from the University of Tulsa in 1971.

== Career ==
After graduation Hussein joined Kuwait National Petroleum Company in February 1972 and worked there until April 1980. Then he began to work at Shuaiba refinery (1972–1974). Then he joined planning department in 1977 and his tenure at the department lasted until 1977. From 1977 to 1980 he worked at international marketing department. He was the board chairman and managing director of the Petrochemical Industries Company (PIC) from 1990 to 1995.

He held different posts at the Kuwait Petroleum Corporation (KPC) including managing director for oil refining and local marketing and managing director for marketing. From 1998 to 2004 he was also board chairman and managing director of Kuwait National Petroleum Company (KNPC). Hussein was made chief executive officer of the KPC in 2004 and he replaced Nader Sultan in the post. Hussein resigned from office in April 2007. In June 2007, then Prime Minister Nasser Al-Mohammad Al-Sabah appointed Hussein as his chief petroleum advisor.

Hussein was appointed oil minister to the cabinet led by Prime Minister Jaber Al Sabah on 24 February 2012, replacing Mohammad Busairi in the post. In a December 2012 cabinet reshuffle Hussein was reappointed to the post. However, he resigned from office on 26 May 2013 due to tensions with members of the Kuwaiti parliament. Finance Minister Mustafa Al Shamali was appointed acting oil minister to succeed him, and on 4 August Shamali was appointed to full portfolio in a cabinet reshuffle.
