= Mustafa Jassem Al-Shamali =

Mustafa Jassem Al Shamali
- مصطفى جاسم الشمالي
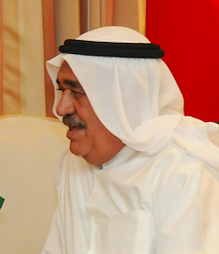
- Mustafa Jassem Al-Shamali, in 2013

Deputy Prime Minister and Minister of Oil
- In office 4 August 2013 – January 2014
- Prime Minister: Jaber Al Mubarak Al Sabah
- Preceded by: Hani Hussein
- Succeeded by: Ali al-Omair

Minister of Finance
- In office 2007 – May 2012
- Prime Minister: Nasser Mohammed Al Sabah
- Preceded by: Badr Mishary Al-Humaidhi
- Succeeded by: Nayef Falah Al-Hajraf

Personal details
- Born: 1943 (age 82–83)
- Education: Ain Shams University

Mustafa Jassem Al-Shamali (born 1943) is a Kuwaiti politician who has had held different cabinet posts. He served as Minister of Finance between 2007 and May 2012. He also served as oil minister from 4 August 2013 to January 2014.

== Early life and education ==
Shamali was born in 1943. He received a bachelor's degree in business and management from Ain Shams University, Egypt, in 1968.

== Career ==
Shamali started his career at the ministry of finance following the graduation. He held different positions at the ministry, including director of the economic cooperation department (1975–1982), director of the ministry's general diwan (1985–1986), the ministry's undersecretary for economic affairs (1986–2006), and director of the ministry's undersecretary (2006–2007).

On 13 December 2011, Shamali was appointed minister of health, but was replaced by Ali Saad Al Obeidi on 14 February 2012. Shamali was appointed finance minister in a cabinet reshuffle in February 2012.

On 27 May 2013, Shamali was also appointed acting oil minister to succeed Hani Hussein who resigned from office. On 4 August he was appointed oil minister. Salem Abdulaziz Al Sabah replaced Shamali as finance minister. Shamali was also made deputy prime minister in the same reshuffle. In addition, he is chairman of the board of the Kuwait Investment Authority (KIA).

In January 2014, Ali Al Omair was appointed oil minister and replaced him in the post.

== The "Settling Score and Revenge Grilling" Incident ==
In March 2012, Musallam Al-Barrak, head of Kuwait’s Public Funds’ Protection Committee, declared that the Popular Action Bloc, would file a motion against officials at the Kuwait Investment Authority (KIA) due to payments made by KIA to Kuwaiti companies. Al-Barrak accused Mustafa Al-Shamali of failing to protect public funds and announced he would be held accountable. Al-Shamali resigned during a parliamentary session after refuting the allegations, denouncing the inquiry as a politically motivated “witch-hunt” and a vendetta by Al-Barrak and other opposition members. He asserted that the questioning strayed from the public interest, aimed instead at personal retaliation. His resignation underlined growing tensions within the three-month-old government, leading to the eventual dissolution of the National Assembly. Despite these events, Al-Shamali was reinstated in the new government following the dissolution, backed by the confidence of the Prime Minister and the Emir of Kuwait.
