= Kuwait Investment Authority =

Sovereign wealth fund of Kuwait

Coordinates: 29°21′52″N 47°58′36″E

- الهيئة العامة للإستثمار

Agency overview
- Formed: 1953; 73 years ago
- Headquarters: Kuwait Investment Authority Tower, Al Asimah
- Agency executives: Saad Al Barrak, Chairman; Ghanem Al Ghenaiman, Managing Director
- Parent agency: Ministry of Finance
- Child agency: Kuwait Health Assurance Company
- Website: www.kia.gov.kw

Kuwait Investment Authority
- AUM: ▲US$1.072 trillion (May 2026)

The Kuwait Investment Authority (KIA) is the State owned sovereign wealth fund of the State of Kuwait, managing the state's reserve and the state's future generation fund, also known as "Ajyal Fund".

Founded in 1953, the KIA is the world's oldest sovereign wealth fund. As of May 2026, it is the world's 5th largest sovereign wealth fund with currently US$1.072 trillion worth of assets under management.

== History and profile ==
KIA was founded on 23 February 1953 to manage the funds of the Kuwaiti Government in light of financial surpluses after the discovery of oil.

KIA manages the Kuwait General Reserve Fund, the Kuwait Future Generations Fund, as well as any other assets committed by the Ministry of Finance. To put KIA's size into perspective, the Kuwait Future Generations Fund has 15% of annual oil revenues added to it.

The Chinese regulator awarded Kuwait Investment Authority an additional $700 million quota on top of $300 million awarded in March 2012. The quota is the highest to be granted by China to foreign investment entities.

The Kuwait Investment Authority has an infrastructure arm and signed an agreement to acquire the oil and gas pipeline firm North Sea Midstream Partners Limited for approximately 1.3 billion GBP in 2018.

== Investments ==
=== Grupo Torras ===
In 1986, the KIA's London based subsidiary, the Kuwait Investment Office (KIO), bought control of Torras Hostench, a Spanish paper maker. Torras subsequently took over a number of other companies to become Grupo Torras in June 1988. KIO invested about $2.5 billion in building up the company and another $1.8 billion to shore it up after the end of Spain's 1980s economic boom and the annexation of Kuwait by Iraq. However, in December 1992 Grupo Torras entered receivership among accusations of fraud, and Kuwait's investment was a total loss. One of its projects was the Gate of Europe twin towers in Madrid, which was still incomplete when the company collapsed.

=== Financial institutions ===
KIA established Cartera Central together two Spanish businessmen in the 1980s, which managed a 12.5% stake in Banko Central. KIA later sold their 48.8% stake in the company.

In September 2006, KIA invested $720 million in the Industrial and Commercial Bank of China. During the global financial crisis in January 2008, KIA purchased preferred stock in Citigroup, at a reported value of $3 billion, which it sold for $4.1 billion in December 2009. KIA also participated in Merrill Lynch's $6.6 billion preferred share issue in January 2008, with an estimated contribution of $2 billion. In January 2009, KIA acquired a 16% stake in Gulf Bank of Kuwait during their recapitalisation. In 2009, KIA also invested $750 million in BlackRock. In July of the same year, it sold its entire 19.8% holding in Boubyan Bank, which was bought by the National Bank of Kuwait and the Securities Group.

In 2010, KIA invested $800 million in Agricultural Bank of China, as well as $1 billion in AIA Group. In September of the following year, KIA invested $200 million in CITIC Securities Hong Kong listing.

In July 2025, KIA sold AIA Group shares worth $3.4 billion, as well as Bank of America stock worth $3.1 billion.

== Corporate governance ==
KIA's board of directors is headed by the minister of finance with other seats allocated to the Energy Minister, Governor of the Central Bank of Kuwait, Undersecretary of the Ministry of Finance, and 5 other nationals who are experts in the field, 3 of which should not hold any other public office.

== See also ==
- Economy of Kuwait
