= Sahar Al-Rumaih =

Kuwaiti economist and banker

- سحر عبدالعزيز الرميح

Deputy Governor of the Central Bank of Kuwait
- Incumbent
- Assumed office 5 September 2022
- Preceded by: Yousef Al-Obaid
- Governor: Basel Ahmad Al-Haroon

Personal details
- Education: Kuwait University
- Occupation: Economist; Banker

Sahar Abdulaziz Al-Rumaih (Arabic: سحر عبدالعزيز الرميح, romanized: Saḥar ʻAbd-al-ʻAzīz al-Rumayḥ) is a Kuwaiti economist and banker. She has been serving as the first woman Deputy Governor of the Central Bank of Kuwait since 2022. She previously served as deputy CEO of the Al Ahli Bank of Kuwait.

== Education ==
Al-Rumaih got a degree in economcis from the Kuwait University in 1988. She has furthered her education through programmes and seminars on banking, Islamic finance and economics at Harvard Business School, the Kuwait Institute for Banking Studies and IMD Business School in Switzerland.

== Career ==
Her professional career began in 1989 when she joined the Commercial Bank of Kuwait, where she held several senior positions and served as Deputy CEO between 2018 and 2021. Al-Rumaih has also served as General Manager of the Corporate Credit Division and headed the Retail Banking Division.

Between 2021 and 2022 she was Deputy CEO of the Al Ahli Bank of Kuwait for Corporate Banking Division. She has also held board positions at organisations such as the Kuwait Banking Association and the Capital Markets Authority.

In September 2022, the Central Bank of Kuwait named Al-Rumaih as its new deputy governor, becoming the first woman to hold the office. She succeeded Yousef Al-Obaid, whose term of office expired. The government of Kuwait approved her appointment on 5 September 2022.
