= Supreme Petroleum Council (Kuwait) =

Agency overview
- Formed: 26 August 1974; 51 years ago
- Jurisdiction: Government of Kuwait

The Supreme Petroleum Council is one of the governmental agencies of Kuwait of which major task is to develop and set the energy policy of the country. In fact, the council is the highest policy body which oversees the overall petroleum and gas sector in Kuwait.

== History and profile ==
The council was established on 26 August 1974 to protect the state’s natural resources along with two other major public bodies, namely the Ministry of Oil and the Kuwait Petroleum Corporation. In addition, the council set Kuwait's general policy of oil and energy.

Saad Al Abdullah Al Sabah and Sabah Al Ahmad Al Sabah, the former Emir of Kuwait, were among the former heads of the council. The latter served in the post between 2003 and 2010.

Then the council began to be headed by the Prime Minister of Kuwait. The council members who are selected by the Amir of Kuwait serve for three years. At the initial phase, the council consisted of four ministers, namely minister of finance and oil, minister of foreign affairs, state minister for Cabinet's affairs and minister of commerce and industry. In 2010 the number of the council members was 18, eight cabinet members and ten representatives of private sector. As of 2013 the council is made up of six ministers and six representatives of private sector. The heads of the Kuwait Petroleum Corporation and of the Central Bank also hold a seat on the council.

In theory, the council meets at least four times annually. However, it did not meet from 2008 to February 2010 due to the resignation of four council members.
