= Ahli United Bank of Kuwait =

- Industry: Financial services
- Founded: 1971
- Headquarters: Joint Banking Complex — East Tower, Mubarak Al-Kabir Street, Safat, Kuwait City, Kuwait
- Website: www.ahliunited.com.kw/en

Ahli United Bank of Kuwait (AUBK) is a traditional bank founded in 1971, providing retail, private and corporate banking services with headquarters in Safat, Kuwait City.

Timeline:

- 1941 - founded as the Imperial Bank of Persia, the first bank in Kuwait and affiliated to the British bank with a concession from the ruler Ahmad Al-Jaber Al-Sabah
- 1971 - concession ended, the bank was 100% Kuwaiti and name was changed to the Bank of Kuwait and Middle East (BKME)
- 2002 - AUB Group became a major shareholder
- 2010 - conversion to Islamic banking.
- 2016 - AUBK was selected as the second safest Islamic bank in Kuwait.
- 2024 - AUBK merged with Kuwait Finance House (KFH).

== See also ==
- List of banks in Kuwait
- List of banks in Asia
