= BLME =

British Sharia-compliant bank

- Type: Private
- Industry: Financial services
- Founded: 7 August 2006; 20 years ago
- Headquarters: London, United Kingdom
- Area served: UK, Middle East
- Key people: Andrew Ball (Chief Executive Officer), Simon Gibbons (Chief Operating Officer), Chris Power (Chief Financial Officer)
- Services: Islamic banking
- Revenue: ▲UK£ 21,558 (Net Operating Income, 2020)
- Website: blme.com

BLME (Bank of London and The Middle East) is a British independent Sharia’a compliant bank that is headquartered in London. As of 2013, it was the largest Islamic bank in Europe.

It was founded in 2006 and offers financial services in three core areas: wealth management, commercial real estate finance and savings products. Bank of London and The Middle East is authorised by the Prudential Regulation Authority and regulated by the Financial Conduct Authority and the Prudential Regulation Authority.

== History ==
BLME was first incorporated in London on 7 August 2006, originally under the name House of London and The Middle East, changing to Bank of London and The Middle East in July 2007. Humphrey Percy, Founder and CEO, met with the original sponsors, Boubyan Bank, establishing their common ambitions to build a market leading wholesale Islamic bank.

BLME received authorisation from the Financial Services Authority (FSA) in July 2007 with a full set of permissions and European passporting.

Since its launch the bank has grown significantly. In 2008 BLME completed their second private placement bringing their total capital base to £250million. BLME launched their Wealth Management division including a Private Bank and Asset Management offering in early 2009.

In 2020, Boubyan Bank acquired a majority stake in BLME Holdings, increasing its ownership to 71.08% in February of that year. Boubyan Bank subsequently increased its stake further, holding 72.37% of BLME Holdings' voting shares as of 31 December 2025, making it the company's majority shareholder.

=== Digital bank - Nomo ===
In July 2021, BLME launched Nomo, a fully licensed, Sharia-compliant UK digital bank.

Since its establishment, BLME has won numerous awards for its services, including several from Islamic Finance News Awards: Best Islamic Bank in Europe (2008), Best Islamic Bank in UK (2009 & 2010, 2011, 2012 and 2013) Best Islamic Leasing Provider (2009) and Deal of the Year (2009). BLME was also awarded the WIBC Institutional Excellence Award in 2009. In 2011, 2012 and 2013 BLME was awarded Best Islamic Bank in Europe by Global Finance Magazine. In 2013 BLME won Reuters/Zawya Best International Asset Manager of the year award.

== Sharia’a Compliance ==
As an Islamic bank, BLME attempts to make sure that its services are wholly Sharia’a compliant and uses these principle to underpin all of its practices. From its foundation, the bank has had a dedicated a Sharia’a Supervisory Board (SSB) to review contracts and agreements. This is to ensures that all policies, practices and governance are in compliance with Sharia’a and Islamic jurisprudence, rooted in transparency, fairness and clarity. This Sharia’a specific regulation and governance is in addition to the conventional regulation that applies to all UK based financial institutions.

== See also ==
- List of banks in the United Kingdom
- Islamic Banking
