= Boubyan Bank =

Bank of Kuwait

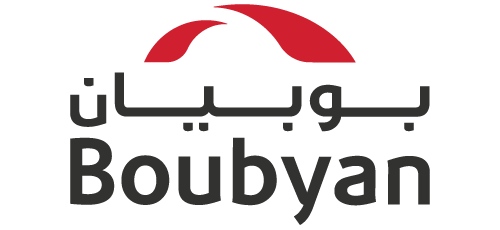
- Native name: بنك بوبيان
- Type: Public
- Traded as: KSE:BOUBYAN
- ISIN: KW0EQ0102065
- Industry: Financial services
- Founded: 2004
- Headquarters: Kuwait City, Kuwait
- Key people: Abdulaziz Abdullah Al-Shaya (Chairman) Adel Abdul Wahab Al-Majed (Vice-Chairman & Group CEO); Abdullah Abdulkareem Al-Tuwaijri (CEO - Consumer, Private, and Digital Banking) Abdul-Salam Mohammed Al-Saleh (CEO - Corporate Banking, Financial Control, Treasury and Legal Affairs)
- Products: Credit cards, consumer banking, corporate banking, finance and insurance, investment banking, Murabaha, private banking, savings
- Revenue: ▲KWD 218.03 million (2023)
- Operating income: ▲KWD 107.45 million (2023)
- Net income: ▲KWD 80.44 million (2023)
- Total assets: ▲KWD 8.40 billion (2023)
- Number of employees: 2,333
- Website: bankboubyan.com/en

Boubyan Bank is a publicly listed Islamic Bank headquartered in Kuwait City, Kuwait. Founded in 2004 following the enactment of Kuwait's Islamic Banks Law, it was the first Islamic bank established under the new regulatory framework.The bank provides Sharia-compliant financial services across consumer banking, corporate banking, and investment banking through its network of branches in Kuwait. Boubyan Bank is one of the emerging banks in Kuwait and GCC, with the National Bank of Kuwait as the major shareholder.

== History ==
The Islamic Banks Law No.33 of 2003 paved the way for Boubyan Bank's establishment through Amiri Decree No. 88 on 21 September 2004. After receiving its license from the Central Bank of Kuwait in November 2004, the bank began operations the following year as Kuwait's first Islamic bank created under the new regulatory framework.

On 15 May 2006, the bank was listed on the Kuwait Stock Exchange (now Boursa Kuwait). In 2009, the National Bank of Kuwait (NBK) acquired a 47.29% stake in Boubyan Bank, becoming its largest shareholder, as of 2025 NBK has 60.4% stake.

The bank's international expansion began in 2020 with the acquisition of majority stake in the UK's Bank of London and the Middle East (BLME).

== Operation & Services ==
The bank's structures its operations across four distinct business segments, all adhering to Islamic Sharia principles through its branch network in Kuwait. Consumer Banking provides consumer finance, credit cards, deposits, and related services to individual and institutional clients. Corporate Banking offers Murabaha financing, Ijarah leasing, trade services, and commercial solutions for business customers. Investment Banking handles direct investments, domestic and international real estate investment, and asset management. Treasury manages Murabaha transactions and Islamic financing with financial institutions, while overseeing funding operations.

=== Digital Banking ===
Boubyan Bank integrated digital services into its operations during their expansion of online and mobile banking platforms. The bank introduced "Musaed," an AI-powered customer service tool, in 2018 to handle inquiries in Arabic and English across digital channels.

A partnership with Intellect Global Transaction Banking in 2021 upgraded the bank's corporate and small-to-medium enterprise digital infrastructure.

== Boubyan Group ==
Boubyan Bank operates through multiple subsidiaries under the Boubyan Group structure, offering services across finance, insurance, investment, and real estate in compliance with Islamic Sharia principles.

=== Subsidiaries ===
Bank of London and the Middle East (BLME) – The UK-based Bank of London and the Middle East, acquired in 2020, offers real estate-focused wealth management, commercial property finance, and savings products.

Boubyan Takaful – The group's insurance subsidiary offers general, family, medical, motor, marine, and engineering Takaful products.

Boubyan Capital – The group's investment and asset management subsidiary provides brokerage, wealth management, alternative investments, and proprietary investment services.

Boubyan National – A real estate services company that handles property development, leasing, maintenance, contracting, and property management.

==== Subsidiaries Ownership (as of 2024) ====
Name	Percentage
Bank of London and the Middle East (BLME)	72.37%
Boubyan Takaful	98.98%
Boubyan Capital	100%
Boubyan National	Fully owned

== Corporate Governance ==
Boubyan Bank operates under a corporate governance framework that includes a Board of Directors, Executive Management team, and Shariah Committee that ensures compliance with Islamic banking principles.

=== Board of Directors ===
Name	Role	Year of Joining
Abdulaziz Abdullah Dakheel Al-Shaya	Chairman	2009
Adel Abdul Wahab Al-Majed	Vice-Chairman & Group Chief Executive Officer	2010
Hazim Ali Al-Mutairi	Director (Non-Executive)	2010
Mohamed Yousef Al-Saqer	Director (Non-Executive)	2019
Waleed Mishari Al-Hamad	Director (Non-Executive)	2010
Fahad Ahmad Al-Fouzan	Director (Non-Executive)	2023
Waleed Khalid Al-Yaqout	Director (Non-Executive)	2025
Khalid Ahmad Al-Mudhaf	Director (Independent)	2022
Abdullah Saud Al-Bader	Director (Independent)	2022
Dr. Amani Khaled Bouresli	Director (Independent)	2025
Rabah Abdulrahman AlRabah	Director (Independent)	2025
Ahmed Mohammad Al-Fahad	General Manager and Secretary	2004

=== Executive Management ===
Name	Role	Year of Joining
Adel Abdul Wahab Al-Majed	Vice-Chairman & Group Chief Executive Officer	2009
Abdullah Abdulkareem Al-Tuwaijri	Chief Executive Officer	2011
Abdul-Salam Mohammed Al-Saleh	Chief Executive Officer – Corporate Banking, Financial Control, Treasury and Legal Affairs	2012
Adel Abdullah Al-Hammad	Group General Manager – Human Resources	2006
Abdullah Ahmed Al-Mehri	Chief Operating Officer	2019
Mohamed Ibrahim Ismail	Group General Manager – Financial Control	2005
Adel Rashed Al-Mutairi	Treasurer – Treasury Group	2015
Abdullah Abdulmohsen Al-Mejhem	Deputy Chief Executive Officer	2021
Ali Yousef Alansari	Group General Manager – Corporate Banking	2012
Dr. Bader Saad Alhashel	Chief Risk Officer	2019
Dalal Dawood Sulaiman Al-Ghunaim	Chief Strategy Officer	2019
Abdullah Khalifa Al-Nusef	Chief Data Officer	2016
Abdullah Fahad Al Khuzam	Chief Information Officer	2023
Osama Mohammed Shehab	Chief Digital Officer	2011
Mona Abdullatif Al Duaij	Group Chief Compliance and Governance Officer	2005
Bushra Abdulwahab Al-Wazzan	Chief Internal Audit	2023
Abdulaziz Fahad Al Duwailah	Head of Banking Operations	2010

== Shariah Committee ==
Boubyan Bank has a Shariah Committee which monitors and approves its activities and transactions, and comprises:

Shariah Committee
Name	Role
Sheikh Dr. Abdulaziz Khalifa Al-Qasar	Chairman
Sheikh Dr. Esame Khalaf Al-Enezi	Member
Sheikh Dr. Mohammed Awad Al-Fuzaie	Member
Sheikh Dr. Ali Ibrahim Al-Rashid	Member

== Financial Performance ==
For the year ended 2025, Boubyan Bank reported a net profit of KD 110.5 million.

== Awards and recognition ==
Boubyan Bank has received recognition from Global Finance magazine for its digital banking services, including awards related to Islamic digital banking and small and medium enterprise (SME) banking in Kuwait.
