= Ali al-Omair =

Member of the National Assembly of Kuwait

Ali Al-Omair
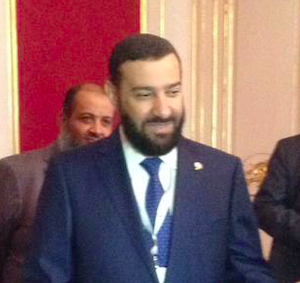
- Ali Al-Omair, at OPEC meeting in Vienna, 2015

Oil Minister
- In office January 2014 – November 2015
- Prime Minister: Jaber Al-Mubarak Al-Hamad Al-Sabah
- Preceded by: Mustafa Jassem Al-Shamali
- Succeeded by: Anas Khalid Al Saleh

Personal details
- Born: 1958 (age 67–68)
- Party: Islamic Salafi Alliance (affiliation)

Ali Al-Omair (born 1958) is a Kuwaiti politician. From January 2014 through November 2015, he served as Oil Minister in the cabinet of Jaber Al-Mubarak Al-Hamad Al-Sabah, succeeding Mustafa Jassem Al-Shamali. He was a member of the Kuwaiti National Assembly, representing the third district. Born in 1958, Al-Omair obtained a PhD in chemistry and worked as a professor before being elected to the National Assembly in 2006. While political parties are technically illegal in Kuwait, Al-Omair affiliates with the Islamic Salafi Alliance party.

== Supported Zakat law ==
In November 2007, the parliament voted 51-2 to approve a law requiring all Kuwaiti public and shareholding companies to pay Zakat every year. Al-Omair was one of the main proponents of the bill.
