= Nasser Al-Kharafi =

Kuwaiti businessman

- ناصر محمد عبدالمحسن الخرافي
- Born: 17 June 1943; Kuwait City, Kuwait
- Died: 17 April 2011 (aged 67); Cairo, Egypt
- Occupations: Chairman, M.A. Kharafi & Sons
- Children: 5, including Bader
- Relatives: Jassem Al-Kharafi (brother); Faiza Al-Kharafi (sister); Fawzi Al-Kharafi (brother)

Nasser Al-Kharafi (Arabic: ناصر محمد عبدالمحسن الخرافي; 17 June 1943 – 17 April 2011) was a Kuwaiti businessman of M. A. Kharafi & Sons.

== Life ==
His company has performed $4.3 billion in sales. His net worth increased because of rising share prices of several holdings including Mobile Telecommunications Co., National Bank of Kuwait and Americana, operator of U.S. fast food chains. Al Kharafi was also linked to many other chains such as Pizza Hut, Kentucky Fried Chicken, TGI Friday's, Hardee's and others. He also held a major stake in one of the biggest telecom companies in the Middle East and Africa, Zain. His businesses spread from engineering, construction, maintenance to other services related to spheres as diverse as oil, water resources and management, chemicals, power and energy and food. Kharafi was not only working in Kuwait, but had extended his businesses to eleven countries. He had a keen interest in Egypt, where the Al Kharafi group built the port Ghalib International Marina.

Al-Kharafi had construction contracts in more than 30 countries worldwide. His net worth was $10.4 billion as of 2011 and he was considered the 77th richest man in the world.

In January 2009 he was linked to a takeover bid for Liverpool F.C.

== Family ==
His older brother, Jassim, who attended Victoria College, Alexandria with him, was the speaker of the Kuwait parliament. His sister, Faiza, was rector of Kuwait University.

== Death ==
On 17 April 2011, Al-Kharafi died from a cardiac arrest in a Cairo, Egypt, hotel room. He was mourned by relatives and close friends, Kuwaiti MPs, politicians and businessmen and international figures. After his death M. A. Kharafi & Sons was passed on to his three surviving brothers Fawzi, Jessaim and Muhannad.

== See also ==
- List of billionaires
- List of Kuwaitis by net worth
