= Ghadeer Aseeri =

Kuwaiti politician

Ghadeer Aseri

Minister of Social Affairs and Labor
- In office December 2019 – January 2020
- Succeeded by: Mariam Al-Aqeel

Personal details
- Born: 17 November 1977 (age 48)
- Spouse: Abdul Hmeed Marafi
- Education: Swansea University UK (PhD); Bryn Mawr College PA USA (MA)

Ghadeer Aseeri (Arabic: غدير أسيري; born 17 November 1977) is a Kuwaiti politician who was the country's Minister of Social Affairs and Labor from December 2019 to January 2020.

== Early life and education ==
Ghadeer Aseeri was born in 1977. Ghadeer Aseeri did PhD in School of Law-Social Policy from Swansea University, United Kingdom in the year 2016. Prior to this, she obtained a foundation in social policy degree from Harvard University in the year 2009 and in the year 2008 she completed her MA in Social work and Social Research from Bryn Mawr College PA USA.

== Career ==
She has also been a consultant to the Prime Minister office of Kuwait (Social Development) from 2003 to 2007 and before that she campaigned for Hillary Clinton during the election of the US President. She has been employed as an assistant professor in Kuwait international law school.

== See also ==
- 36th Cabinet of Kuwait
