= Fawzi Al-Kharafi =

Kuwaiti billionaire (died 2021)

- فوزي الخرافي
- Born: 1944 or 1945; Kuwait
- Died: 13 December 2021 (aged 76)
- Citizenship: Kuwaiti
- Occupations: CEO and vice chairman of the M. A. Kharafi & Sons
- Spouse: married
- Parent: Mohammed Abdul Mohsen Al-Kharafi
- Relatives: Nasser Al-Kharafi (brother); Jassem Al-Kharafi (brother); Faiza Al-Kharafi (sister)

Fawzi Al-Kharafi (Arabic: فوزي الخرافي; born 1944/1945 – died 13 December 2021) was a Kuwaiti billionaire businessman.

== Biography ==
He was the CEO and vice chairman of the M. A. Kharafi & Sons. He was the son of Mohammed Abdul Mohsen Al-Kharafi, the founder of M. A. Kharafi & Sons. In March 2018, Forbes estimated his net worth at US$1.2 billion. He married and lived in Kuwait City, Kuwait.

Al-Kharafi died on 13 December 2021 at the age of 76. He was buried at the Sulaibikhat Cemetery.
