= Commercial Bank of Kuwait =

- Headquarters of the bank
- Company type: Public bank
- Traded as: BK: CBK
- ISIN: KW0EQ0100036
- Industry: Banking
- Founded: June 19, 1960; 65 years ago
- Headquarters: Kuwait City, Kuwait
- Number of locations: 60 (2025)
- Key people: Ahmad Duaij Al-Sabah (Chairman)
- Revenue: KWD 123 million (2025) (USD 403 million)
- Total assets: KWD 5,3 billion (2025) (USD 17,4 billion)
- Total equity: KWD 784 million (2025) (USD 3,9 billion)
- Number of employees: 2000+ (2025)
- Website: www.cbk.com

The Commercial Bank of Kuwait, (known as Arabic: التجاري, Al Tijari, commercial) was established on 19 June 1960. It is the second oldest bank of Kuwait, and has a major role in retail and commercial financing.

== History ==
The bank faces its most severe historical test during the August 1990 Iraqi invasion of Kuwait. The occupation completely disrupted the domestic financial sector, causing widespread physical asset destruction, data vulnerabilities, and economic paralysis. Following Kuwait's liberation in February 1991, Al-Tijari embarked on a massive operational recovery campaign.

== See also ==
- List of banks in Kuwait
