= Ali Salem Al-Ali Al-Sabah =

Kuwaiti politician

Ali Salem Al-Ali Al-Sabah served as the former Kuwaiti minister of Finance and Minister of Transportation.

== Career ==
Sheikh Ali Al-Salem Al-Ali Al-Sabah finished his bachelor's degree in 1978 in Mechanical Engineering from George Washington University. He holds a doctorate in mechanical engineering and a doctorate in administrative sciences from Imperial college London. He assumed the position of Minister of Finance and Minister of Transportation in the eighteenth government.
