= Gulf Bank of Kuwait =

Gulf Bank
- Type: Public
- Industry: Banking
- Founded: 1960; 66 years ago
- Headquarters: Kuwait City, Kuwait

Gulf Bank is one of the banks in Kuwait with a broad offering of consumer banking, wholesale banking, treasury, and financial services. It was founded in 1960, registered with the Central Bank of Kuwait and listed as Gulf Bank (GBK) on the Kuwait Stock Exchange (Boursa Kuwait) in 1984.

Gulf Bank is one of the leading conventional banks in Kuwait with KD 7.2 billion in total assets as of 31 December 2023 and provides a wide range of services including consumer banking, wholesale banking, treasury, and financial services through its network of over 50 branches and over 300 ATMs in Kuwait.

== History ==
Gulf Bank was founded in 1960, and commenced business operations in a rented flat on Fahad Al-Salem Street in Kuwait City with a total of 50 employees and a capital of 24 million rupees, equivalent to KD 1.8 million (US$6 million). The Bank received permission from the Kuwait municipality in 1961, to construct its headquarters and was initially granted permission to build up to four floors and an optional basement. Over the years, additional floors were constructed in the headquarters, but care was taken to maintain the original architecture and design of the building whereby maintaining its historic look and keeping to its early roots. The headquarter building was recognized as a Kuwaiti landmark.

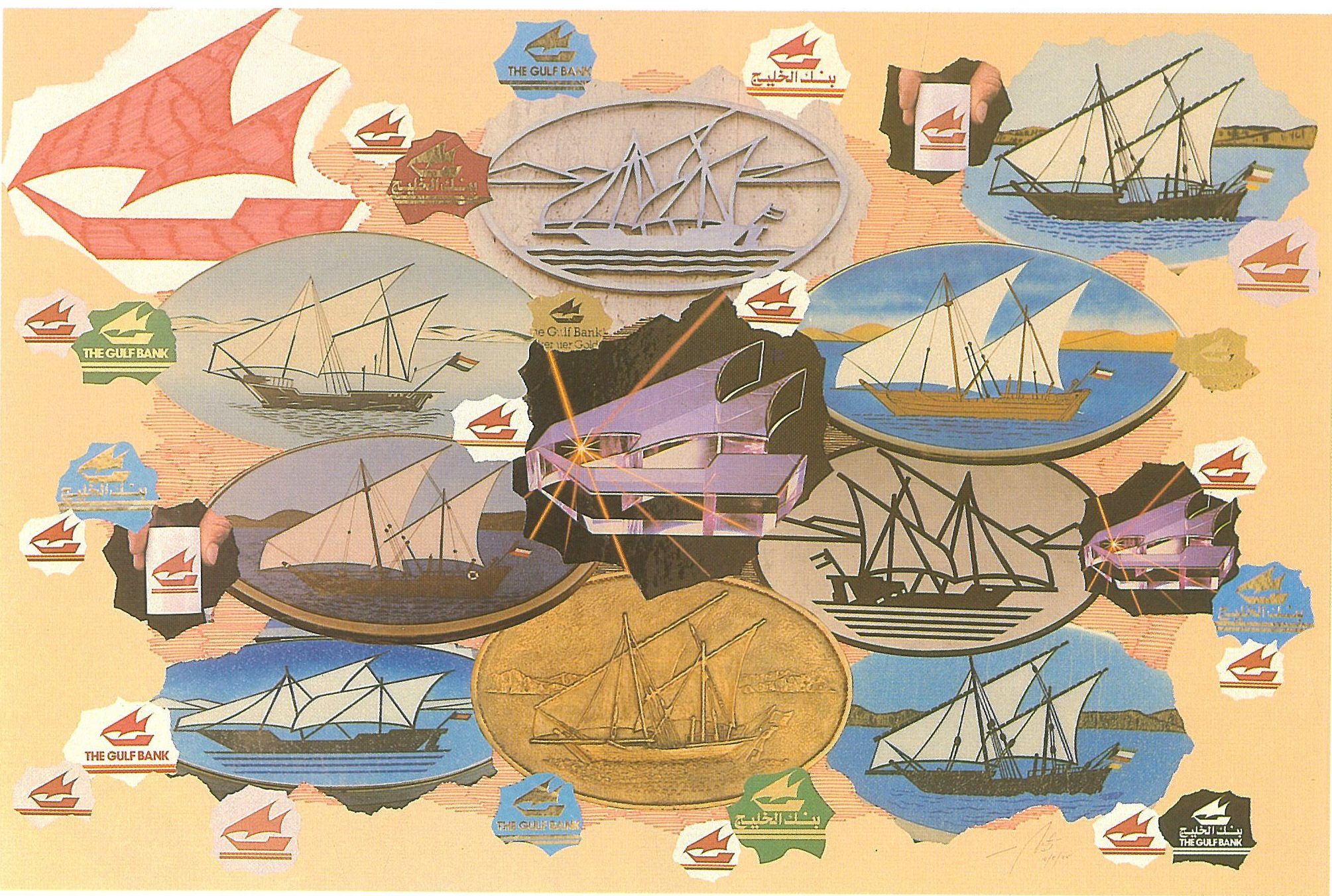

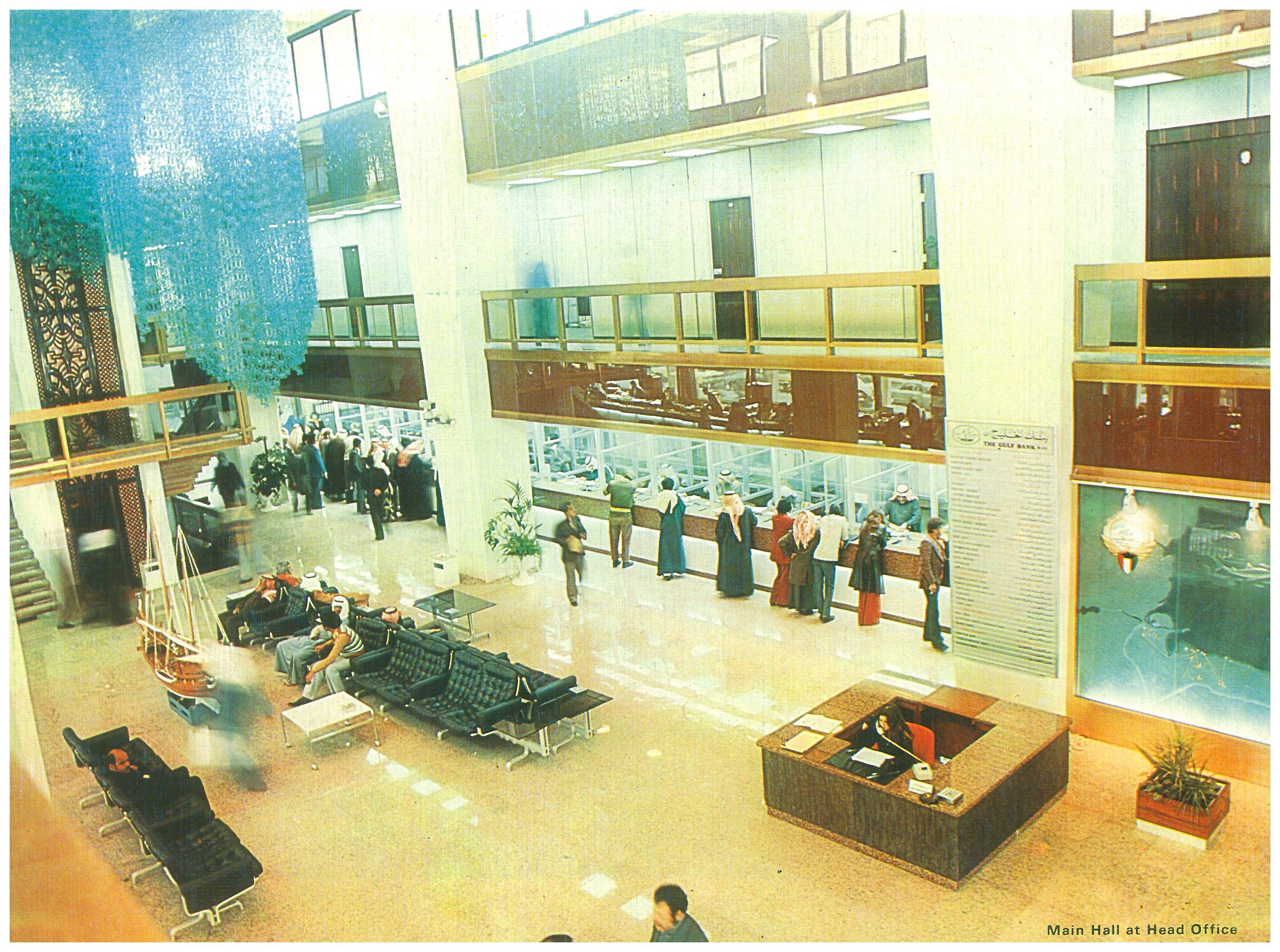
Gulf Bank Head Office - Old Image

== Board of Directors ==
Bader Nasser Al-Kharafi (Chairman)

Ali Morad Yusuf Behbehani (Deputy Chairman)

Omar Hamad Youssef Al-Essa (Board Member)

Abdullah Sayer Bader AlSayer (Board Member)

Dr. Fawaz Mohammad Alawadhi (Board Member)

Abdullateef Abdulazeez AlSharikh (Board Member)

Barrak Abdulmohsen Ahmad Al-Asfour (Board Member)

Ahmad Mohammad Al Bahar (Board Member)

Dr. AbdulRahman Al-Taweel (Board Member)

Talal Ali Nasser Al-Sayegh (Board Member)

Reem Abdullah Al Saleh (Board Member)

== Executive Management ==
Waleed Mandani (Acting Chief Executive Officer)

Sami Mahfouz (Deputy Chief Executive Officer)

David Challinor (Chief Financial Officer)

Abdulrahman AlSaddah (Acting Chief Risk Officer)

Ali AlFaras (Chief Internal Auditor)

Mona Mansour (GM - Customer Service Delivery)

Salma AlHajjaj (GM - Human Resources)

Mohammed AlQattan (GM - Consumer Banking)

Faisal AlAdsani (GM - Corporate Banking)

Dari AlBader (GM - Corporate Affairs)

Shahzad Anjum (GM - Information Technology)

Hani AlAwadhi (GM - Investments)

Lamia Karam (GM - Treasury)

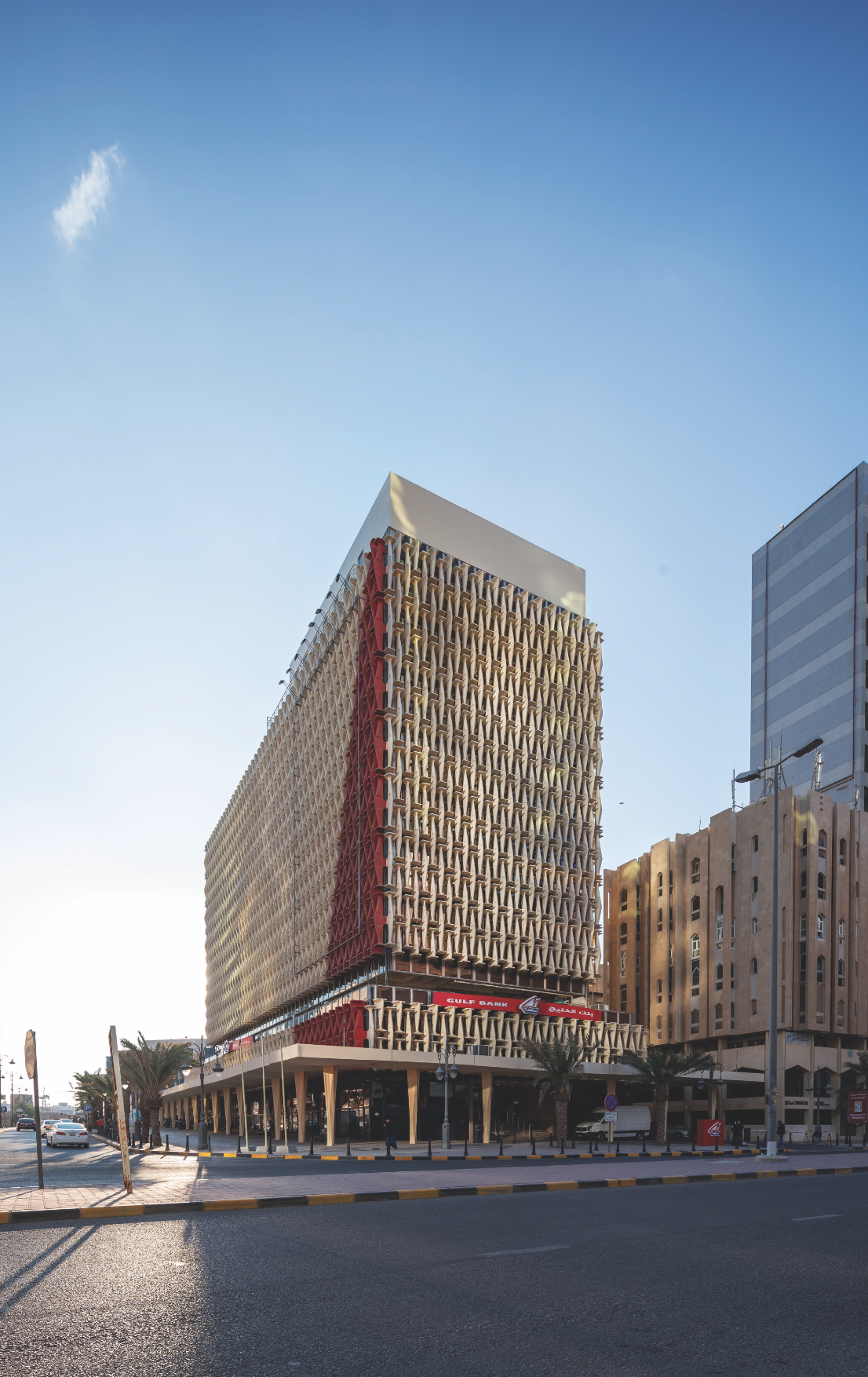
