= Ali Al-Khalifa Al-Sabah =

Former Kuwaiti Minister of Oil and Finance

Ali Al-Khalifa Al-Athbi Al-Sabah
- علي الخليفة العذبي الصباح

Minister of Oil
- In office 1985–1990

Minister of Finance
- In office 1983–1985
- Preceded by: Abdul Latif Yousef Al-Hamad
- Succeeded by: Jassem Al-Kharafi

Minister of Oil
- In office 1978–1983

Personal details
- Born: October 22, 1945 (age 80)

Sheikh Ali Al-Khalifa Al-Sabah (born October 22, 1945) is a Kuwaiti ruling family member and former minister of oil and finance. He was minister of finance from 1983 to 1985.
