= Mariam Al-Aqeel =

Kuwaiti accountant and politician (born 1968)

Mariam Eqeal Al-Saied Hashem Al-Aqeel (Arabic: مريم عقيل السيد هاشم العقيل; born 1968) is a Kuwaiti accountant and politician who was the country's Minister of Finance from December 2019 to February 2020.

== Early life and education ==
Al-Aqeel was born in 1968. She has a degree in accounting from Kuwait University.

== Career ==
From 1990 until 1997, Al-Aqeel was an accountant at the Ministry of Higher Education. She has worked in Ministry of Finance since 1997, as an Auditor at the Public Authority until 2009 and then as Director of Budgeting, Vice President of the Financial Controllers Bureau, and Director General of the Central Statistics Bureau until 2018. She has previously chaired the Joint Financial Controllers Committee at the Ministry of Finance, the Statistical Center of the Gulf Cooperation Council, and the Board of Trustees of the Arab Institute for Training and Research in Statistics in Jordan.

Al-Aqeel was appointed Minister of State for Economic Affairs in December 2018. In March 2019, she was a member of Kuwait's delegation to United Nations Commission on the Status of Women in New York, where she praised Kuwait's "magnificent" effort in empowering women.

On 6 November 2019, Al-Aqeel was appointed Acting Minister of Finance after the resignation of Nayef Al-Hajraf. She was then appointed to the role in new Prime Minister Sabah Al-Khalid Al-Sabah's government in December 2019 after the resignation of the Cabinet in a dispute with parliament. She is the first female finance minister in Kuwait and in the Gulf region. In her role, she heads the country's two major public financial institutions, the Public Institution for Social Security and the Kuwait Investment Authority, the fifth largest sovereign wealth fund in the world. On 14 January 2020 she unveiled the country's budget for the 2020-2021 fiscal year, forecasting a 9.2b dinar deficit to be covered by withdrawals from the Treasury or General Reserve Fund. She said that the government would push the National Assembly to pass a stalled public debt law and advocate legislation to implement selective taxes.

== Awards and honours ==
In 2019, Al-Aqeel received the Arab Woman of the Year Award for Achievement in Economic Development Leadership from the Arab Women's Foundation in Britain.
