= M. A. Kharafi & Sons =

Private company based in Kuwait

Mohamed Abdulmohsin Al Kharafi and Sons Company مجموعة الخرافي
- Type: Private (Limited Liability)
- Industry: Conglomerate
- Founded: 1956
- Headquarters: Safat, Kuwait City, Kuwait
- Area served: Africa, Middle East, Albania, Belize, Bulgaria, Indonesia, Kazakhstan, Maldives & Netherlands
- Key people: Nasser Al-Kharafi (chairman) & (president); Fawzi Al-Kharafi (CEO)
- Products: Aluminum, Asphalt, Computer, Concrete, Fertilizer, Food, Prefabricated construction supplies, Real Estate, Steel, Telecom, Wastewater treatment plants
- Services: Airlines, Airports, Broker, Hotels, Travel services agents
- Revenue: US$ 4.5 Billion (2008)
- Number of employees: 20,000 (2008)
- Website: makharafi.net

M.A. Kharafi & Sons (Mohammed Abdulmohsin Al-Kharafi & Sons W.L.L., Arabic: مجموعة الخرافي) is a private company based in Kuwait with a variety of commercial interests and revenues for 2006 estimated at $3.3 billion. The company was run by Nasser Al-Kharafi until his death in 2011. Al-Kharafi is also a supplier and integrator to the newspaper industry in Kuwait. In 2011 the Kharafi family was listed at 77th position in Forbes magazine's list of the world's richest people.

The company was founded by Mohamed Abdul Mohsen Al Kharafi in 1956 as a contracting company.

The company sold its shares in Americana to Mohamed Al Abbar, (who is one of the founders of Emaar) in 2016 for $2.3 billion.

In May 2015, Fawzi Al-Kharafi was delegated and assigned by the family as a chairman and president following the death of Jassim. He died in 2021.

== Organization structure and related entities ==
M.A. Kharafi & Sons is a privately owned limited liability company. It has subsidiaries in Europe, Asia, and Africa in the construction, tourism real estate, and food and food processing sectors.

== Subsidiaries, associates and affiliates ==
Name	Country	Holding
Al Khair National for Stocks and Real Estate Company	Kuwait	100.00%
Al Nasser Real Estate Company	Lebanon	100.00%
Emak Paper Manufacturing Company	Egypt	100.00%
Kharafi Construction	Kuwait	100.00%
Kuwait United Company	Kuwait	100.00%
Kuwaiti British Readymix Company	Kuwait	100.00%
LMAK for Agencies and Trading Company	Lebanon	100.00%
Lebanese Real Estate Commercial Company	Lebanon	100.00%
Lebanese Utilities Company	Lebanon	100.00%
M A Kharafi Construction	South Africa	100.00%
M A Kharafi and Sons Company - Saudi Arabia	Saudi Arabia	100.00%
M A Kharafi and Sons Company - The Gambia	The Gambia	100.00%
M A Kharafi and Sons Company (MAK)	Kuwait	100.00%
MAK Bulgaria	Bulgaria	100.00%
MAK Contracting	Lebanon	100.00%
MAK Hospitality and Touristic Investmests	Lebanon	100.00%
MAK Hospitality and Touristic Investments - Syria	Syria	100.00%
MAK Lebanon	Lebanon	100.00%
MAK Pty	Botswana	100.00%
Marsa Alam Tourism Development Company	Egypt	100.00%
Mohamed Abdulmohsin Al Kharafi and Sons	Tanzania	100.00%
Sovereign Hospitality Holdings	Switzerland	100.00%
Sovereign Hospitality Holdings - Egypt (via Sovereign Hospitality Holdings)	Egypt	100.00%
Alexandria Fertilizers Company	Egypt	85.00%
Kharafi National Company	Kuwait	80.00%
Arab Company for Computer Manufacturing	Egypt	71.00%
Arab Aluminium	Egypt	68.00%
Kuwait Food Company (via Al Khair National Company for Stocks and Real Estate Company)	Kuwait	64.78%
National Investments Company (via Al Khair National for Stocks and Real Estate Company)	Kuwait	51.73%
Admak General Contracting Company	(United Arab Emirates) UAE	49.00%
Al Mal Investment Company (via Al Khair National for Stocks and Real Estate Company)	Kuwait	47.85%
AutoMak Automotive Company	Kuwait	45.00%
Heavy Engineering Industries and Shipbuilding Company (via Al Khair National for Stocks and Real Estate Company)	Kuwait	42.62%
Kuwait Cryo Industrial Company	Kuwait	40.00%
Coast Investment and Development Company (via Al Khair National for Stocks and Real Estate Company)	Kuwait	32.71%
Gulf Cement Company - UAE (via Al Khair National for Stocks and Real Estate Company)	(United Arab Emirates) UAE	26.33%
Alamiah Building Company	Kuwait	-
Albania Airlines MAK	Albania	-
Aluminium Industries Company	Kuwait	-
Al Qebla Al Watya - Kuwait	Kuwait	-
Archi Systems Contractor	Kuwait	-
AutoMak General Trading and Contracting Company - Kuwait	Kuwait	-
Aviation World MAK BV	Netherlands	-
Bubiyan Fisheries Company	Kuwait	-
Chateau Linza Hotel and Restaurant	Albania	-
Credit Bank of Albania	Albania	-
Cybermak Information Systems Company	Kuwait	-
EMAK Contracting Company	Egypt	-
EMAK International Academy	Egypt	-
EMAK Marsa Alam for Management and Operation of Airports	Egypt	-
EMAK Marsa Alam for Touristic Development and Urban Investment	Egypt	-
EMAK Real Estate Development	Egypt	-
EMAK for Agencies and Trading Company	Egypt	-
EMAK for Tourism and Real Estate Development	Egypt	-
EMAK for Utilities and Services	Egypt	-
Egyptian Marsa Alam Aviation Services	Egypt	-
Egyptian Packing and Wrapping Materials Company (Misr Packaging)	Egypt	-
Egyptian Sponge (Misr Foam)	Egypt	-
Emirates Utilities Holding Company (EUCH)	(United Arab Emirates) UAE	-
Express Air and Travel	Egypt	-
Gulf Insulating Materials	Kuwait	-
Integrated Marketing Services	Egypt	-
Isofoam Insulating Materials Plant	Kuwait	-
Isofoam SA	South Africa	-
Kairaba Beach Hotel and Resort	The Gambia	-
Kharafi Investments and Development - South Africa	South Africa	-
Kiwan Tourist Investment Company	Syria	-
Kuwaiti Iraqi Holding Company	Kuwait	-
MAK Brake Lining Company	Egypt	-
MAK Farm Foods	The Gambia	-
MAK Hospitality	South Africa	-
MAK Travel and Tours	South Africa	-
MAK Travel, Tourism and Airfreight Company	Kuwait	-
MAK United for General Trading	Kuwait	-
MAKXalto Advanced Card Technology	Egypt	-
Mali Robit Golem Resort	Albania	-
Marsa Alam for Touristic Development	Egypt	-
Media Phone for General Trading	Kuwait	-
Mosaic Stairs Factory	Kuwait	-
National Company for Plastic Industries	Syria	-
National Piling Company	Kuwait	-
Pan Arab Research Center	(United Arab Emirates) UAE	-
Pan Arab Research Center - Kuwait	Kuwait	-
Sabhan Steel Factory	Kuwait	-
Sheraton Aleppo Hotel and Towers	Syria	-
Sheraton Tirana Hotel	Albania	-
Star Taxi	Syria	-

== Investments ==
Name	Country	Holding
Kuwait Pipe Industries and Oil Services Company (via Al Khair National for Stocks and Real Estate Company)	Kuwait	15.82%
Gulf North Africa Holding Company	Kuwait	15.00%
Kuwaiti Syrian Holding Company	Kuwait	15.00%
Rasamny Younis Motor Company	Lebanon	12.80%
Mobile Telecommunications Company (via Al Khair National for Stocks and Real Estate Company)	Kuwait	12.49%
Egypt Kuwait Holding Company (via Al Khair National for Stocks and Real Estate Company)	Egypt	12.42%
National Industries Group Holding (via Al Khair National for Stocks and Real Estate Company)	Kuwait	9.84%
National Slaughterhouse Company	Kuwait	9.35%
Kuwait Financial Centre (via Al Khair National for Stocks and Real Estate Company)	Kuwait	7.2%
Al Razzi Holding Company	Kuwait	5.00%
National Ranges and Real Estate Company (via Al Khair National for Stocks and Real Estate Company)	Kuwait	5.00%
ABJ Engineering and Contracting Company	Kuwait	1.00%
Port Ghalib	Egypt	-

== Companies under management ==
Name	Country	Holding
Marsa Alam International Airport	Egypt	-

== Developments and Projects ==
Name	Country	Holding
Kiwan	Syria	-
