= Hind Sabeeh Barak Al-Sabeeh =

Kuwaiti politician

- Occupation: Government Minister

Hind Sabeeh Barak Al-Sabeeh is a government minister in Kuwait. She is in charge of the Ministry of Social Affairs and Labour and the Ministry of Economic Affairs.

== Biography ==
Hind worked in Kuwait Industries Union as the general manager in 2012. In 2014 she was made the Minister of Social Affairs and Labor and in the 2016 cabinet reshuffle she was also made the Minister of Economic affairs. She was the only woman in the Cabinet of Kuwait. She established the first minimum wage in the Kuwait oil industry and private sector in June 2017 at $247.02. Forbes Middle East placed her on 4 on a list of most powerful women politicians in Arab governments. She met Turkish Development Minister Lutfi Elvan in September 2016, were they discussed ways to improve Kuwait-Turkey ties and encourage Turkish contractors in Kuwait. She sponsored the Sharakah Forum and workshop from 19 to 23 March 2017. The Sharakah forum and workshop is organized to bring social welfare participants and built collective capacity. She helped launch the Huawei Kuwait Innovation and Training Center which was built to provide technological training to young Kuwaitis. She represented Kuwait in the 4th Ministerial Consultation of Abu Dhabi Dialogue held in Colombo, Sri Lanka.
