= Ministry of Oil (Kuwait) =

Government ministry of Kuwait

Ministerial Department overview
- Formed: 1 April 1975; 51 years ago
- Jurisdiction: Government of Kuwait
- Headquarters: Kuwait City
- Minister responsible: Tariq Suleiman Al-Roumi, Minister of Oil
- Child Ministerial Department: Kuwait Petroleum Corporation (KPC)
- Website: Official website

The Ministry of Oil is one of the governmental bodies of Kuwait and part of the cabinet.

== History and profile ==
The production and export of oil in Kuwait were among the responsibilities of Kuwait's finance department until 1962 when the department was reorganized under the name of the ministry of finance and oil. Then the body was renamed as the ministry of finance and economy and dealt with oil-related policies until April 1975 when the ministry of oil was established. The ministry was established to protect the state’s natural resources along with two other major public bodies, namely the Supreme Petroleum Council and the Kuwait Petroleum Corporation. The ministry is headquartered in Kuwait City.

In 1986 the ministry was separated from the Ministry of Finance. At the same time on 12 August 1986 the mission of the ministry was refined and includes the following: Protecting, exploiting and developing the petroleum resources, and raising the share of petroleum in the national income and securing the safety of workers, environment and structures. The ministry was reorganized as part of the Ministry of Energy in 2003. Following this reorganization, energy policy of the country is overseen by the ministry. The Kuwait Petroleum Corporation is the major state-run body governed by the ministry.

== Ministers and functions ==
The minister of oil is the major advisor to the Emir of Kuwait. The minister is also a member of the Supreme Petroleum Council.

From 1978 to June 1990 Ali Khalifa Al Sabah was the minister of oil. Saud Nasser Al Sabah served in the post between 1998 and 2000. He resigned from the post in June 2000 due to an explosion that killed five workers at three oil refineries. Adel Al Subaih served as oil minister until February 2002 when he resigned from the post. He was replaced by Ahmed Fahd Al Sabah as oil minister.

The ministry was headed by five different officials between February 2006 and February 2009. In late 2007 Bader Mishari Al Humaidhi was appointed oil minister. However, he resigned from office only eight days after his appointment due to harsh criticisms of the members of the Kuwaiti parliament. Mohammad Al Olaim was the oil minister until his resignation in November 2008. Abdulmohsen Al Madaj also served as Kuwaiti oil minister.

From February 2009 to May 2011 Ahmad Al Abdullah Al Sabah served as the minister of oil. Mohammad Al Busairi was the oil minister from May 2011 to February 2012. Hani Hussein was named the oil minister in a cabinet reshuffle in February 2012. Hussein resigned from office on 26 May 2013 due to tensions with members of the Kuwaiti parliament. Mustafa Jassem Al Shamali served as oil minister from 4 August 2013 to January 2014, when Ali al-Omair replaced him in the post and became the ninth oil minister since 2004. In November 2015, Al-Omair was replaced by Anas Khalid Al Saleh as acting oil minister. On October 29, 2024, Tariq Suleiman Al-Roumi became the new Minister of Oil.

== See also ==
- Kuwait Petroleum Corporation
- Kuwait Oil Company
- Petroleum industry in Kuwait
