= Anas Khalid Al Saleh =

Kuwaiti businessman and politician (born 1972)

Deputy Prime Minister; Minister of Interior
- In office 17 December 2019 – December 2021
- Prime Minister: Sabah Al-Khalid Al-Sabah
- Preceded by: Khaled Al Jarrah Al Sabah
- Succeeded by: Thamer Ali Al Sabah (as minister of interior)

Deputy Prime Minister; Minister of Commerce and Industry
- In office 1 February 2012 – 17 December 2019
- Prime Minister: Jaber Al Mubarak Al Sabah

Personal details
- Born: 11 January 1972 (age 54) Kuwait City, Kuwait
- Spouse: Shaimaa Nabeel Almulla
- Education: Portland State University
- Website: Official website

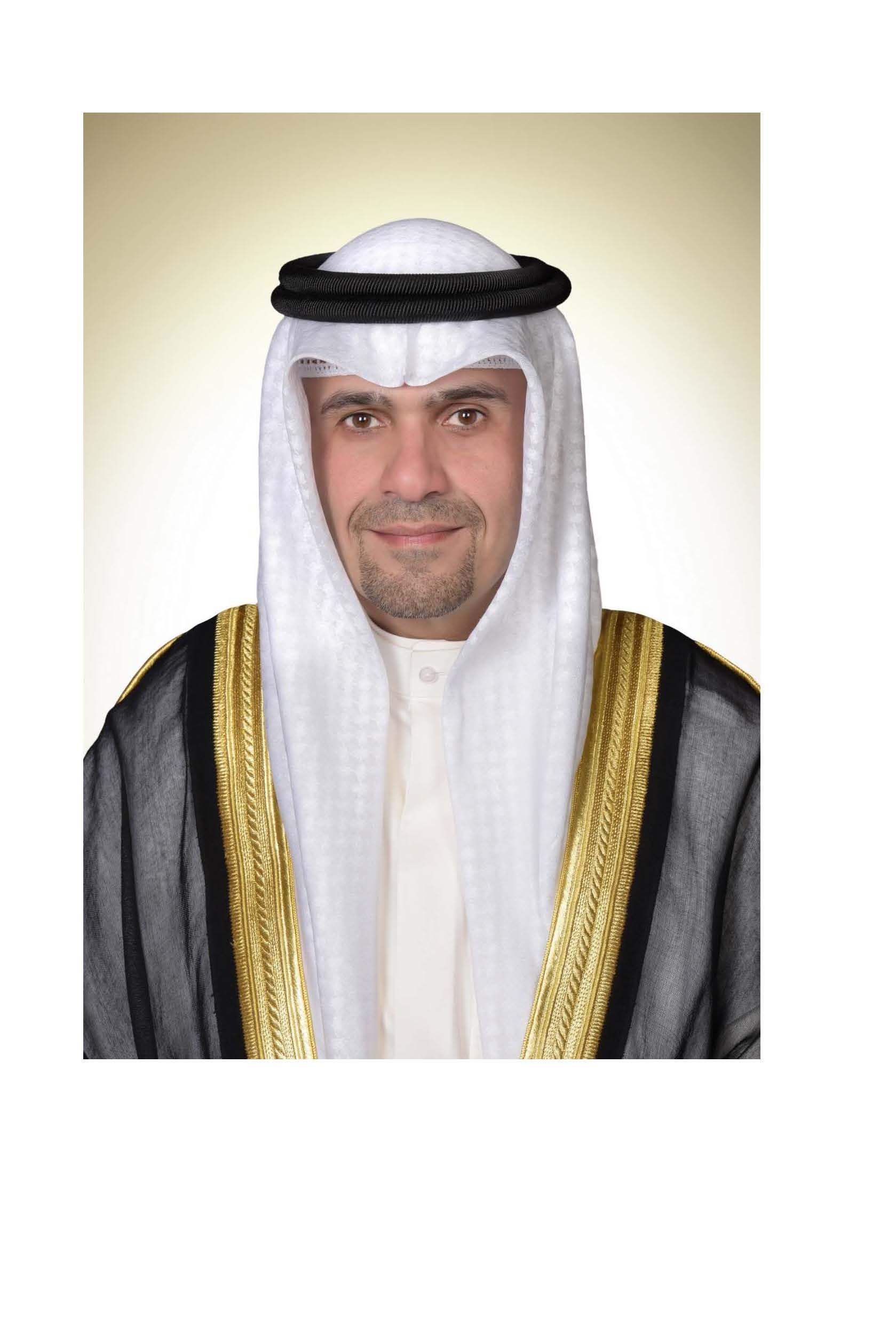
Anas Khalid Al Saleh

Anas Khalid Al Saleh (Arabic: أنس خالد الصالح; born 11 January 1972) is a Kuwaiti businessman and politician. He held the positions of deputy prime minister, minister of interior, and minister of cabinet affairs from 2019 to 2021. Prior to these roles, he served as minister of finance from January 2014 until December 2017 and as minister of commerce and industry from February 2012 to January 2014.

== Early life and education ==
Al Saleh was born in 1972. He earned his bachelor’s degree in business administration from Portland State University in 1997. In recognition of his achievements, Portland State University awarded him an honorary degree in 2017.

== Career ==
Anas Al Saleh was the board chairman and managing director of Kuwait Invest Holding Company (KSCC) in 2006 and the board member of Kuwait Chamber of Commerce and Industry (KCCI) from 2006 to 2010. He was appointed minister of commerce and industry to the cabinet led by Prime Minister Jaber Al Mubarak Al Hamad Al Sabah in February 2012. He was also made chairman of foreign investment capital committee. He retained his post in the August 2013 reshuffle. In January 2014, his term as minister of commerce and industry ended and Abdulmohsen Al Madaj replaced him in the post.

Al Saleh was appointed minister of finance in the same reshuffle, replacing Salem Abdulaziz Al Sabah in the post. In January 2015 he was appointed deputy prime minister. In November 2015 he also became Kuwait's acting oil minister. From 2019 to 2021 he was the deputy prime minister and minister of interior. He was succeeded by Thamer Ali Al Sabah as minister of interior.

Al Saleh is the chairman of the SAK Holding Company and a board member of the National Investment Company.
