= Jaber Al-Mubarak Al-Hamad Al-Sabah =

Kuwaiti royal and politician (1942–2024)

His Highness Sheikh Jaber Al-Mubarak Al-Hamad Al-Sabah
- جابر مبارك الحمد الصباح
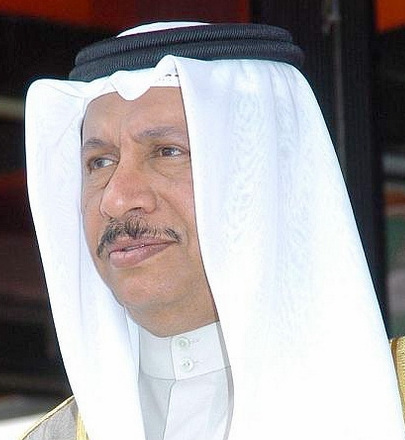
- Al-Sabah in 2022

7th Prime Minister of Kuwait
- In office 4 December 2011 – 19 November 2019
- Monarch: Sabah Al-Ahmad Al-Jaber Al-Sabah
- Deputy: Sabah Al-Khalid Al-Sabah
- Preceded by: Nasser Mohammed Al-Ahmed Al-Sabah
- Succeeded by: Sabah Al-Khalid Al-Sabah

First Deputy Prime Minister of Kuwait
- In office 9 February 2006 – 4 December 2011
- Prime Minister: Nasser Mohammed Al-Ahmed Al-Sabah
- Preceded by: Muhammad Sabah Al-Salem Al-Sabah
- Succeeded by: Sabah Al-Khalid Al-Sabah

Minister of Defense
- In office 14 February 2001 – 4 December 2011
- Prime Minister: Nasser Mohammed Al-Ahmed Al-Sabah
- Preceded by: Salem Sabah Al-Salem Al-Sabah
- Succeeded by: Ahmad al-Hamoud al-Sabah

Personal details
- Born: 5 January 1942 Kuwait City, Kuwait
- Died: 14 September 2024 (aged 82) Kuwait City, Kuwait
- Party: Independent

Sheikh Jaber Al-Mubarak Al-Hamad Al-Sabah (Arabic: جابر مبارك الحمد الصباح, romanized: Jābir Mubārak al-Ḥamad aṣ-Ṣabāḥ, 5 January 1942 – 14 September 2024) was a Kuwaiti royal and politician who served as the prime minister of Kuwait from 2011 to 2019. He previously served as minister of defense as well as deputy prime minister. In April 2021 a Kuwaiti court ordered his detention on corruption charges.

Jaber was first appointed prime minister on 4 December 2011. A year later, on 5 December 2012, he was reappointed prime minister following the parliamentary election held on 1 December 2012. He was re-appointed in the same position on 1 November 2017.

== Career ==
Jaber began his career an advisor at the administrative affairs department in the Amiri Diwan in 1968 and served there until 1971. Then, he served as director of the administrative affairs department in the Diwan until 1975. He went on to become assistant undersecretary of administrative and financial affairs at the Diwan until 1979. In that year, he became a governor, serving from 1979 to 1985 at Hawally and from 1985 to 1986 at Ahmedy. He was minister of social and labor affairs from 1986 to 1988 and minister of information from 1988 to 1990.

After the liberation of Kuwait in 1991, Jaber became advisor to the office of the Emir, a position he held until 2001. On 14 February 2001, he was named deputy prime minister and defense minister. In 2004, Jaber became chairman of the Supreme Council of Environment. In 2006, he was appointed first deputy prime minister, as well as interior and defense minister. The following year, he was named first deputy prime minister and defense minister.

Sabah was appointed prime minister on 4 December 2011. On 5 December 2012, he was reappointed prime minister following a parliamentary election held on 1 December 2012.

In January 2014 it was announced that he had reshuffled his five-month-old cabinet, replacing seven members, including the oil and finance ministers, and raising the number of Islamists to four. The reshuffle came two weeks after all the ministers submitted their resignations to Sabah after several cabinet members, including the prime minister himself, were questioned by MPs. Emir Sabah Al Ahmad Al Sabah accepted the resignation of seven of the 15 ministers and decreed the appointment of new ministers. The modified cabinet included a new oil minister, Ali Al Omair, a lawmaker who was a senior member of the Islamist Salaf Alliance. He replaced Mustafa Al Shamali.

=== Corruption charges ===
On 13 April 2021, a Kuwaiti court ordered the detention of Jaber Al Mubarak Al Hamad Al Sabah on corruption charges. He was the first former Kuwaiti prime minister to face pre-trial detention over graft charges. The crimes allegedly took place during Jaber Al-Sabah's 2001–11 term as defense minister.

== Activities ==
He was a patron of the Sheikh Mubarak Al Hamad Al Sabah Journalism award, created in 2008 to honor excellence in Kuwaiti journalism.

== Personal life ==
Jaber Al-Mubarak Al-Sabah was born in Kuwait City on 5 January 1942. He was married to several women. One of his sons, Ahmed, married the daughter of Ibrahim bin Muhammed Al Ghanim, a member of the Kuwaiti Al Ghanim family. On 11 April 2023, his son, Mubarak, died at the age of 45.

Jaber died in Kuwait City on 14 September 2024, at the age of 82.

== Honours ==
On 20 November 2007, King Hamad bin Issa Al Khalifa awarded Jaber the "Medal of King Issa, First Class," following his visit to Bahrain where he took part in the Middle East Forum on Internal and World Security. On 5 November 2009, he became the first Arab to be awarded Japan's highest honor conferred on foreigners, Order of the Rising Sun, Grand Cordon.

Political offices
Preceded by Mahbob Al-Sabah	Minister of Defense; 2001–2011	Succeeded by Ahmad al-Hamoud al-Sabah
Preceded by Muhammad Sabah Al-Salem Al-Sabah	Deputy Prime Minister of Kuwait; 2007–2011	Succeeded by Sabah Al-Khalid Al-Sabah
Preceded by Nasser Mohammed Al-Ahmed Al-Sabah	Prime Minister of Kuwait; 2011–2019	Succeeded by Sabah Al-Khalid Al-Sabah
