= Ministry of Commerce and Industry (Kuwait) =

Government ministry of Kuwait

- وزارة التجارة
- Kuwait MOC uses the emblem of Kuwait as its logo

Agency overview
- Formed: 28 January 1963; 63 years ago
- Jurisdiction: Government of Kuwait
- Headquarters: Kuwait City
- Minister responsible: Osama Khaled Boodai
- Website: www.moci.gov.kw

The Ministry of Commerce and Industry is one of the governmental bodies of Kuwait and part of the cabinet.

The current minister is Osama Khaled Boodai, who was appointed in February 2026.

== History ==
The Ministry was established on 28 January 1963 under the name of the Ministry of Finance, Industry and Commerce.

== Organisational structure ==
The ministry comprises the following departments:

- Department of Consumer Protection
- Assistance Agency for Tourism Affairs
- Assistance Agency of the affairs of trade control
- Assistance Agency of Affairs of World Organisations and Intellectual Property Rights
- Assistance Agency for Corporate Affairs and Business Licenses
- Assistance Agency for Foreign Trade Affairs
- Technical Affairs and Trade Development
- Assistance Agency for planning and technical support
- Office of Foreign Capital Investment.

=== Former ministers ===
- Khalifa Khalid Ghoneim
- Abdullah Al Jaber Al Sabah
- Khalid Sulaiman Al Adsani
- Abdul Wahab Yusuf Al Nafisi
- Jassim Khaled Dawood Al Marzouq
- Jassem Mohammad Al Kharafi
- Faisal Abdul Razzaq Al Khalid
- Nasser Rawdhan
- Abdullah Al Jarallah
- Abdullah Rashed Al Hajri
- Hilal Mishari Mutairi
- Jassim Abdullah Al Mudaf
- Hisham Al Otaibi
- Abdulwahab Al Wazzan
- Salah Abdul Redha Khurshid
- Abdullah Abdul Rahman Al Tawil
- Falah Fahad Al Hajri.
- Ahmed Yacoub Baqer Al Abdullah
- Ahmad Rashed Al Haroun.
- Amani Bouresli
- Anas Khalid Al Saleh
- Abdulmohsen Al Madaj
- Yousef Al Ali Ph.D.
