= Ministry of Finance (Kuwait) =

Government ministry of Kuwait

Ministerial Department overview
- Formed: 1962; 64 years ago
- Preceding Ministerial Department: Finance Department
- Jurisdiction: Government of Kuwait
- Headquarters: Kuwait City
- Minister responsible: Dr. Subaih Abdul Aziz Abdul Muhsen Al-Mukhaizeem
- Child Ministerial Department: Kuwait Investment Authority
- Website: Ministry of Finance

Ministry of Finance is one of the governmental bodies of Kuwait and part of the cabinet. It is concerned with the executive general administration of public financial affairs in the State of Kuwait. As of August 2025 the Acting minister is Dr. Sabeeh Al-Mukhaizeem.

== History and profile ==
On 2 July 1938, the Financial Department was established in Kuwait. It dealt with the financial policies of the country until 1962 when the department was reorganized under the name of the ministry of finance and economy. In 1963 it was reshaped and named as ministry of finance and industry. Then the body was renamed as the ministry of finance and oil in 1965 and dealt with finance- and oil-related policies until April 1975 when the ministry of oil was established. At the same time the ministry was reorganized under the current name, the ministry of finance in 1975. The ministry extensively dealt with land purchases and comprehensive infrastructure projects.

In 1982 Public Investment Authority was established and attached to the ministry. The Kuwait Investment Authority was founded in 1985 and has been under the control of the ministry and has been headed by the finance minister. The ministry also regulates Kuwaiti stock market along with the Kuwait Stock Exchange, the Ministry of Commerce and Industry and the Central Bank of Kuwait.

The ministry which had been dominated by the Bani Jabir branch of the ruling family of Kuwait played a significant role during the invasion of Kuwait by Iraqi forces in 1990 in that it paid billions of dollars to allied countries in the form of aid or in contributions to the war effort. During this period the ministry was located at the London headquarters of the Kuwait Investment Office.

== Ministry tasks ==
The Ministry of Finance supervises the public treasury, state property (public and private), areas of international economic cooperation, monetary investment, and projects for compensatory deals. It also provides services for public hospitality, housing for state employees, integrated financial systems services, warehousing and public procurement systems and other developmental automated systems for all financial sectors in state agencies. In addition to preparing draft public budgets, preparing the final accounts of the state, setting rules for their implementation, following up on them, and supervising state revenues from taxes, financial stamps and expenditures, in a specialization issued by a decision of the Ministry of Finance. of 1986 and Decree-Law No. 31 of 1978 and No. 105 of 1980.

== Ministers ==
- Mashaan Khudhair Al-Mashaan, 1938–1939
- Abdullah Al-Salim Al-Sabah, 1939–1940
- Ahmad Al-Jaber Al-Sabah, 1940–1950
- Jaber Al-Ahmad Al-Sabah, 1959–1965
- Sabah Al-Ahmad Al-Sabah, acting, 1965–1967
- Abdul Rahman Salem Al Ateeqi, 1967–1981
- Abdul Latif Yousef Al-Hamad, 1981–1983
- Ali Khalifa Al-Athbi Al-Sabah, 1983–1985
- Jassem Al-Kharafi, 1985–June 1990
- Nasser Abdullah Al-Roudhan, 1991–1998
- Ali Salem Al-Ali Al-Sabah, 1998–1999
- Ahmad Al Abdullah Al Sabah, 1999–2001
- Youssef Hamad Al-Ibrahim, 2001–2003
- Muhammad Sabah Al-Salem Al-Sabah, acting, January 2003–July 2003
- Mahmoud Abdel-Khaleq Al-Nouri, July 2003–2005
- Badr Mishary Al-Humaidhi, 2005–2007
- Mustafa Jassem Al-Shamali, 2007–May 2012
- Nayef Falah Al-Hajraf, acting, May 2012–August 2013
- Salem Abdulaziz Al Sabah, August 2013–January 2014
- Anas Khalid Al Saleh, January 2014–December 2017
- Nayef Falah Al-Hajraf, December 2017–December 2019
- Mariam Al-Aqeel, December 2019–February 2020
- Barak Ali Barak Al-Sheetan, February 2020 - December 2020
- Khalifa Musaed Hamada, December 2020–December 2021
- Abdulwahab Al-Rushaid, December 2021−March 2023
- Manaf Abdulaziz Al Hajeri, April 2023–July 2023
- Fahd Abdulaziz Al Jarallah, September 2023–December 2023
- Anwar Ali Al Mudhaf, January 2024–August 2024
- Noora Suleiman Al Fassam, August 2024-August 2025
- Dr. Sabeeh Al-Mukhaizeem (Acting), August 2025-present
- Fahad Al-Jarallah
- Yaqoub al-Rifai, February 2026
