= Boursa Kuwait =

Stock exchange in Kuwait

Boursa Kuwait Securities Co.
- بورصة الكويت

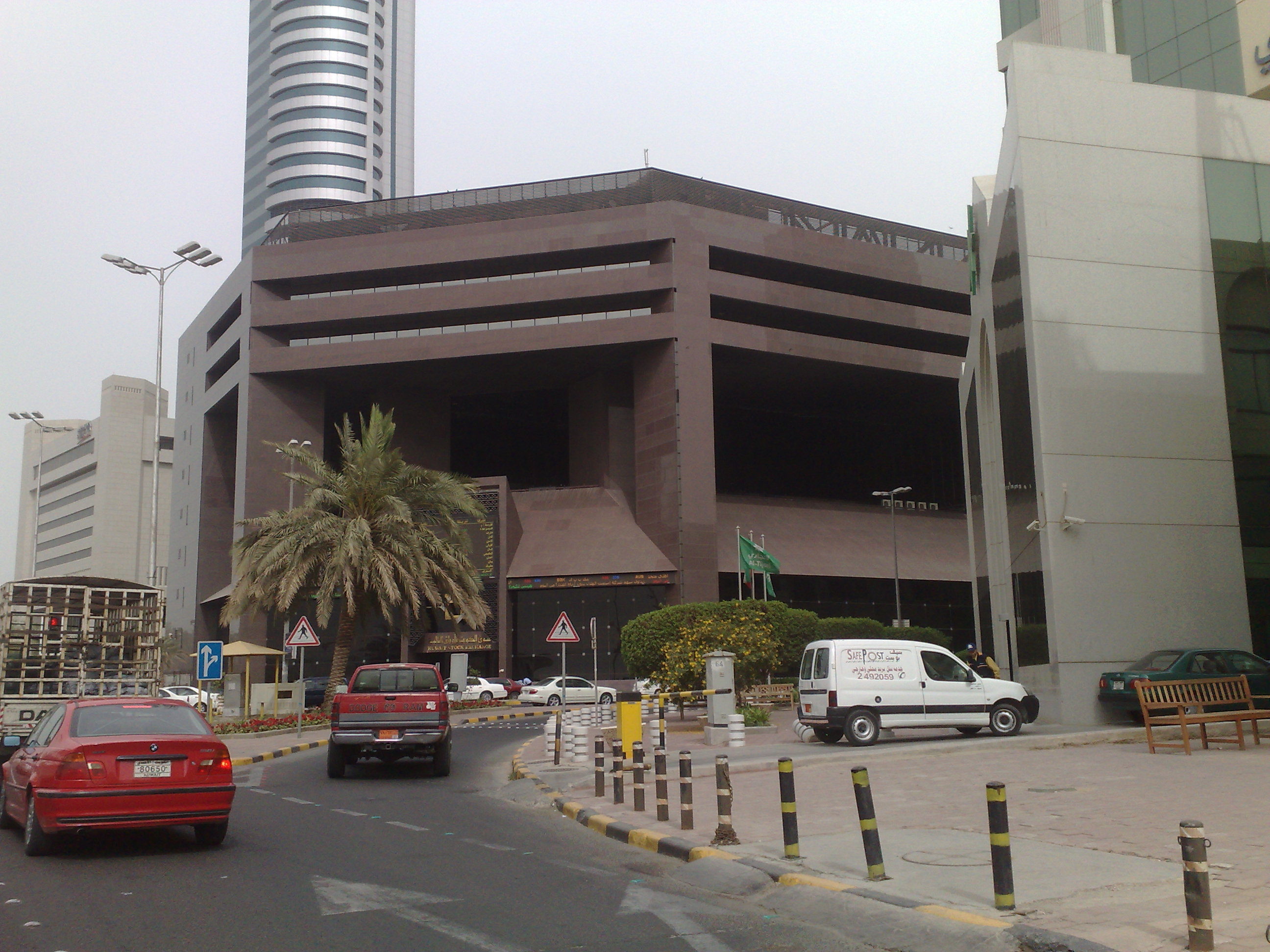

Boursa Kuwait Securities Co., is the private-sector corporate owner and operator of the Kuwait Stock Exchange (KSE), the national stock market of Kuwait.

== History ==
Although several share holding companies (such as the National Bank of Kuwait in 1952) existed in Kuwait prior to the creation of the Kuwait Stock Exchange, it was not until October 1962 that a law was passed to organize the country's stock market. In April 1977, the stock exchange was initiated, and it was named as the Kuwait Stock Exchange (KSE) in 1983.

The stock market in Kuwait is regulated by four bodies: the KSE, the Ministry of Commerce and Industry, the Ministry of Finance and the Central Bank of Kuwait.

On April 24, 2016, the Kuwait Stock Exchange became fully operated by a private company and its name changed to Boursa Kuwait, making it the only stock exchange in the Middle East owned by the private sector.

On September 14, 2020, the Boursa Kuwait Securities Co. was listed on Boursa Kuwait, becoming a self-listed exchange.

Boursa Kuwait was a member of the Federation of Euro-Asian Stock Exchanges.

== See also ==
- Souk Al-Manakh stock market crash
- Economy of Kuwait
- List of Mideast stock exchanges
- List of stock exchanges
