= Government of Kuwait =

Political system in Kuwait

Kuwait is an emirate. The Emir of Kuwait, a hereditary monarch from the Al Sabah ruling family appoints the prime minister (who is always a royal) and other members of government, as well as members of judicial, police and financial institutions.

== Executive branch ==
The Constitution of Kuwait was approved and promulgated on 17 November 1962.

=== Government ===
The prime minister chooses the cabinet of ministers, which form the government. The prime minister is a member of the ruling family and is appointed by the Emir.

=== Emir ===
Current Emir: Mishal Al-Ahmad Al-Jaber Al-Sabah
Current Crown Prince: Sabah Al-Khalid Al-Sabah

== Judicial branch ==
The judiciary in Kuwait is not independent of the government, the Emir appoints all the judges and many judges are foreign nationals from Egypt. In each administrative district of Kuwait, there is a Summary Court (also called Courts of First Instance which are composed of one or more divisions, like a Traffic Court or an Administrative Court); then there is Court of Appeals; Cassation Court, and lastly - a Constitutional Court which interprets the constitution and deals with disputes related to the constitutionality of laws. Kuwait has a civil law legal system.

== Legislative branch ==
Emir

Legislative power is exercised by the Emir. He issues laws and policies via decrees.

Former legislature

The National Assembly was formerly the legislature, established in 1963. Its predecessor, the 1938 National Assembly was formally dissolved in 1939 after "one member, Sulaiman al-Adasani, in possession of a letter, signed by other Assembly members, addressed to Iraq's King Ghazi, requesting Kuwait's immediate incorporation into Iraq". This demand came after the merchant members of the Assembly attempted to extract oil money from Ahmad Al-Jaber Al-Sabah, a suggestion refused by him and upon which he instigated a crackdown which arrested the Assembly members in 1939. The National Assembly had up to 50 MPs.

== Gulf War ==
During the 1990-1991 Gulf War, Saddam Hussein attempted to make Kuwait the 19th province of Iraq (known as Kuwait Governorate). During the Iraqi occupation, Ali Hassan al-Majid became the governor and took over what was left of the original government.

== VIP Flight ==
The State of Kuwait operates several VIP jets used mainly by the Emir of Kuwait:

- 1 Airbus A319-100 ACJ
- 1 Airbus A320-200
- 2 Airbus A340-500
- 1 Boeing 737-900ER
- 1 Boeing 747-8
- 4 Gulfstream Aerospace
