= Central Bank of Kuwait =

State-owned bank in Kuwait

Central Bank of Kuwait بنك الكويت المركزي

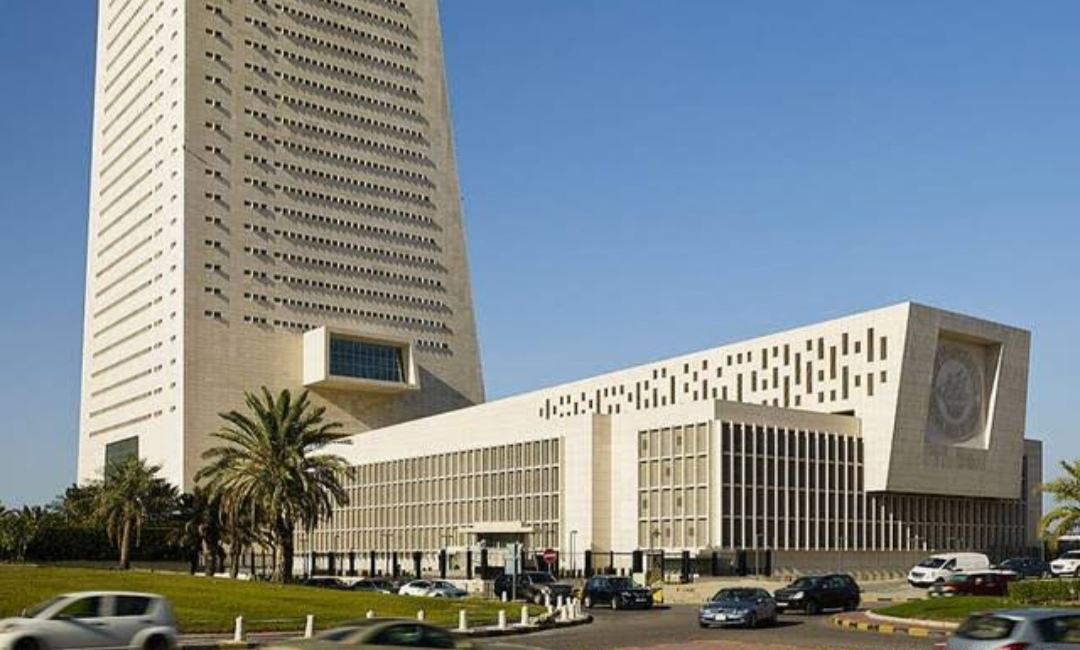
- Central bank of: State of Kuwait
- Headquarters: Kuwait City
- Coordinates: 29.3774°N 47.9714°E
- Established: 30 June 1968; 58 years ago
- Ownership: 100% state ownership
- Governor: Basel Ahmad Al-Haroon
- Currency: Kuwaiti dinar
- Reserves: 25.660 million USD
- Website: cbk.gov.kw

The Central Bank of Kuwait (CBK; Arabic: بنك الكويت المركزي, romanized: Bank al-Kuwayt al-Markazī) is the central bank of Kuwait. It offers a strict currency system on behalf of the state. The bank regulates Kuwaiti stock market along with the Kuwait Stock Exchange, the Ministry of Commerce and Industry and the Ministry of Finance.

== Overview ==
It was established on 30 June 1968, succeeding the Kuwait Currency Board that had been created in 1 April, 1961. The bank launched Financial Intelligence Unit in 2003.

Salem Abdulaziz Al Sabah served as the governor of the bank for over a quarter of a century, until February 2012, when he resigned after criticising the state's spending policies. Dr. Mohammad Al Hashel succeeded Sabah as governor in April 2012 and Yousef Al Obaid as deputy governor in May 2012.

== Governors ==
Governors of the Central Bank of Kuwait.

- Hamza A. Hussein (12 September 1973 – 11 September 1983)
- Abdulwahab Al-Tammar (1 November 1983 – 30 September 1986)
- Salem Abdulaziz Al Sabah (1 October 1986 – 11 February 2012; resigned)
- Mohammad Al-Hashel (1 April 2012 – 31 March 2022)
- Basel Ahmad Al-Haroon (1 April 2022 - present)

== Deputy Governors ==
In September 2022, Sahar Al-Rumaih became the first woman Deputy Governor of the Central Bank.

== See also ==
- List of tallest buildings in Kuwait
- List of central banks
- List of financial supervisory authorities by country
