= 2025 in Kuwait =

- Decades: 2000s; 2010s; 2020s
- See also: Other events of 2025; List of years in Kuwait; Timeline of Kuwaiti history

Events in the year 2025 in Kuwait.

== Incumbents ==
Photo	Post	Name
	Emir of Kuwait	Mishal Al-Ahmad Al-Jaber Al-Sabah
	Prime Minister of Kuwait	Ahmad Al-Abdullah Al-Sabah

== Holidays ==
- 1 January – New Year's Day
- 30 January – The Prophet's Ascension
- 25 February – National Day
- 26 February – Liberation Day
- 30 March – 1 April – Eid al-Fitr
- 5 June – Arafat Day
- 6–9 June – Eid al-Adha
- 26 June – Islamic New Year
- 4 September – The Prophet's Birthday

== Events ==
=== January ===
- 20 January – Kuwait Oil Company announces the discovery of significant commercial quantities of hydrocarbon resources in the Al-Julai'a offshore field within Kuwaiti territorial waters, marking the second discovery of its kind in Kuwait's offshore area.

=== February ===
- 4 February – Appointment of Sheikh Abdullah Ali Abdullah Al-Salem Al-Sabah as Minister of Defense.

=== March ===
- 8 March – All flights to and from Kuwait are briefly suspended for undisclosed reasons.
- 12 March – Six Americans held in Kuwait on drugs-related charges are released and returned to the United States following a visit by US special envoy Adam Boehler.
- 16 March – Kuwait abolishes Article 153, ending reduced penalties for "honor killings," and raised the legal marriage age to 18 for both genders.
- 24 March – A major sweepstakes scandal reveals rigged draws, pre-selected winners, and a lack of transparency. The Ministry of Interior announces the arrest of the main perpetrators, including the raffle director at the Ministry of Commerce, the fictitious winner, and her husband.

=== April ===
- 16 April – Kuwait hosts the third Central Asia–Gulf Cooperation Council ministerial meeting.
- 22 April – Kuwait enforces a new traffic law.
- 30 April – Ten Americans held in Kuwait on various charges are released and returned to the United States.

=== June ===
- 1 June – Five people are killed in a fire at an apartment block in Riggae.

=== August ===
- 14 August – At least 23 people are reported to have died while 147 others are recorded as having suffered from alcohol poisoning linked to the consumption of bootleg alcohol. At least 63 suspects are arrested in connection with the incident.

=== September ===
- 14 September – Bidding opens for the three new cities of Al Mutla'a, East Saad Al Abdullah, and West Saad Al Abdullah, in order to ease a housing shortage under a 2023 law allowing public-private partnerships.

== Deaths ==
- 2 January – Abdulaziz Ali Saleh Al-Haddad (aged 74), an actor and director
- 23 March – Khalid Al-Jarrallah (aged 78), a diplomat and undersecretary of the Ministry of Foreign Affairs (1999–2021)
- 26 May – Waleed Al-Jasem (aged 65), a footballer.
- 14 June – Hussein Al-Qattan (aged 98/99), an actor.
- 1 July – Badr Al-Yaqoub (aged 79), a politician.
- 8 August – Mohammed Al Manea (aged 95), an actor.
- 11 September – Imad Mohammad Alatiqi, (aged 69), a politician.
