= 2026 in Kuwait =

- Decades: 2000s; 2010s; 2020s
- See also: Other events of 2026; List of years in Kuwait; Timeline of Kuwaiti history

Events in the year 2026 in Kuwait.

== Holidays ==
- 1 January – New Year's Day
- 16 January – The Prophet's Ascension
- 25 February – National Day
- 26 February – Liberation Day
- 20 March – 22 March – Eid al-Fitr
- 26 May – Arafat Day
- 27– 28 May – Eid al-Adha
- 16 June – Islamic New Year
- 27 August – The Prophet's Birthday

== Events ==
=== January ===
- 15–29 January – 2026 Asian Men's Handball Championship

=== February ===
- 1 February – Cabinet reshuffles.
- 22 February – Kuwait summons the Iraqi chargé d'affaires in protest over the submission by Iraq of revised maps and maritime boundaries to the United Nations.
- 28 February –
  - In retaliation for the 2026 Israeli–United States strikes on Iran, Iran launches missiles at surrounding countries, including Kuwait.
  - Iranian Shahed drones strike Kuwait International Airport resulting in minor injuries to several airport workers as well as damage to the main airport terminal.

=== March ===
- 1 March – Six American soldiers are killed in an Iranian drone strike on a US military operations center in Port Shuaiba.
- 2 March –
  - Three F-15E fighter jets of the U.S. Air Force crash in Kuwait during combat operations against Iran after being mistakenly shot down by the Kuwait Armed Forces. All crew members survive. The United States Central Command (CENTCOM) confirms the loss of the three aircraft in a friendly fire incident.
  - Iranian drones strike the U.S. embassy in Kuwait City.
  - Two Kuwait Naval Force members are killed amid Iranian attacks.
- 4 March – An 11-year-old girl dies at Amiri Hospital from injuries sustained after shrapnel fell in a residential area in the Capital Governorate.
- 5 March – The United Kingdom Maritime Trade Operations reports that an explosion struck a tanker anchored in waters about 60 km (37 mi) off the coast of Kuwait, causing an oil spill from a damaged cargo tank.
- 7 March – The Kuwait Petroleum Corporation announces a precautionary reduction in crude oil production and refining operations in response to Iranian attacks and threats to shipping through the Strait of Hormuz.
- 8 March –
  - The headquarters of the Public Institution for Social Security Fund is damaged in an Iranian air attack.
  - Two members of the General Administration of Land Border Security die after shrapnel fell on Mutlaa Road. One of them was Al-Salmiya SC footballer Fahad Al-Mejmed, who had held his testimonial match just days before his death.
- 12 March – Kuwait International Airport is targeted by several drones, causing material damage but no injuries.
- 14 March – Three soldiers are injured in a drone strike that damages Ahmad al-Jaber Air Base.
- 15 March – An Italian MQ-9 Reaper is destroyed in an Iranian drone strike on Ali Al Salem Air Base.
- 16 March – The Ministry of Interior arrests 16 people, including 14 Kuwaitis and two Lebanese, on suspicion of involvement with Hezbollah.
- 19 March – Iranian Shahed drones strike two oil refineries in Kuwait causing large fires, according to the Kuwait National Petroleum Company.
- 20 March – Iran attacks the Mina al-Ahmadi refinery.
- 25 March – A drone strikes a fuel tank at Kuwait International Airport, causing a fire at the site.
- 27 March – Kuwait, Saudi Arabia and the United Arab Emirates report that they have intercepted missile and drone attacks.
- 29 March – Ten Kuwaiti soldiers are injured in a new wave of missile and drone attacks over Kuwait.
- 30 March – An Iranian attack on a power and water desalination plant kills an Indian worker and damages a building at the site.

=== April ===
- 1 April – A fuel storage at Kuwait International Airport is hit by Iranian drones, causing a major fire.
- 5 April –
  - An Iranian drone causes a fire at the Kuwait Petroleum Corporation building, which also houses the Ministry of Oil.
  - An office complex housing government ministries in Kuwait City is struck by a drone, causing significant property damage.
  - Two power plants and their associated desalination facilities are severely damaged. The electricity and water ministry confirms the failure of two power generation units.
- 6 April —
  - The Ministries Complex, the Shuwaikh Oil Complex, and desalination plants are struck by Iranian attacks.
  - Iran claims to be targeting U.S. satellite equipment and ammunition on Bubiyan Island using drones.
  - Fifteen Americans are wounded in an overnight Iranian drone strike on Ali Al Salem Air Base.

=== May ===
- 28 May — Five Americans including soldiers and contractors are slightly injured and one US MQ-9 Reaper drone is destroyed and at least one more is seriously damaged in an Iranian strike on Ali Al Salem Air Base.

=== June ===
- 3 June – One person is killed in a series of Iranian air attacks on Kuwait, including at Kuwait International Airport. Iran denies responsibility for the attack on the airport, attributing it to a malfunction of a US-made Patriot air defence system, a claim the US denied which was later proven wrong with security footage of the incident a day later.

=== July ===
- 24 July – The United States imposes a 12.5% tariff on Kuwait, citing the presence of alleged forced labour in the supply chain.

=== August ===
- 6 August – Kuwait orders the closure of the only Iranian school in the country.
- 12 August – Authorities announce a foiled Islamic State attack against a critical site.
- 28 August – Pakistan and Kuwait sign a new defense accord.

=== October ===
- 5 October – A $400 million sale of "repair and return services" for Patriot missiles to the country is approved by the Trump administration.
- 27 October – A court sentences three defendants to death in a case involving espionage for Iran and Hezbollah, as well as a plot to assassinate authorities, including First Deputy Prime Minister and Minister of Interior Sheikh Fahd Al-Yousef.

=== November ===
- 10 November – The Gulf Cooperation Council authorizes the establishment of a headquarters for its Unified Military Command in Kuwait.

== Deaths ==
- 31 January – Fathi Kameel, 71, footballer (Al-Tadamon, national team).
- 8 March – Fahad Al-Mejmed, 33, footballer (Al-Qadsia, Al-Salmiya, national team), naval officer (Kuwaiti Navy)
- 21 April – Hayat Al-Fahad, 78, actress.
- 2 August – Anbar Saeed, 67, footballer (Al-Arabi SC, Ahli Sidab Club).
