= 2021 in Kuwait =

- Decades: 2000s; 2010s; 2020s
- See also: Other events of 2021; List of years in Kuwait; Timeline of Kuwaiti history

This article is an overview of all the events of 2021 that occurred in the nation of Kuwait.

== Incumbents ==
- Emir: Nawaf Al-Ahmad Al-Jaber Al-Sabah
- Prime Minister: Sabah Al-Khalid Al-Sabah

== Events ==
COVID-19 pandemic in Kuwait

=== January ===
- 12 January: the entire Kuwaiti cabinet resigns
- 13 January: the prime minister Sheikh Sabah Al-Khalid Al-Sabah formally accepts his resignation
- 19 January: Kuwait confirmed its first two cases of the highly infectious UK COVID-19 variant
- 24 January: the Emir issued a decree reappointing Sheikh Sabah Al-Khalid as Prime Minister and tasked him with forming a new cabinet.

=== February ===
- 14 February – Kuwait surpasses 1,000 deaths after reporting 5 new deaths in the past 24 hours.

=== April ===
- 13 April: a court ordered the pre-trial detention of former Prime Minister Sheikh Jaber al-Mubarak al-Sabah and former minister Sheikh Khalid al-Jarrah over allegations of financial mismanagement
- 28 April: Opposition MPs occupied the government ministers' seats in the National Assembly
- The government amended freedom of speech laws in April to prohibit the pre-trial detention of individuals in cases involving freedom of expression.

=== March ===
- 2 March - The 38th Cabinet formed the government of Kuwait.

=== July ===
- 23 July - Kuwait competes at the 2020 Summer Olympics with 10 competitors in 5 sports. Lara Dashti became the first Kuwaiti woman to be the flagbearer for Kuwait at any Olympics.
- 26 July - Abdullah Al-Rashidi won the bronze medal at Shooting in the 2020 Summer Olympics

=== November ===
- 8 November - The Prime Minister & his government submitted their resignation.
- 14 November - The Amir accepted the resignation of the Prime Minister & his government.

=== December ===
- 28 December - The 39th Cabinet formed the government of Kuwait.

== Deaths ==
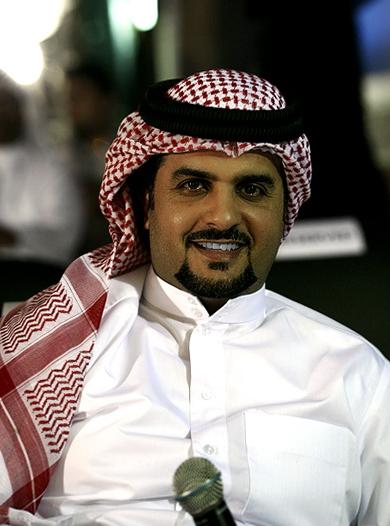
Mashari Al-Ballam

- 10 January - Khaled Al-Ansari, (aged 81) writer, researcher & historian, one of the pioneers of Kuwait's literature & history.
- 24 January - Mohammad Al-Khatib, (aged 77) footballer, former Arabi SC & Kuwait national football team.
- 11 February - Saad Al Nahedh, (aged 96), former chairman of the Kuwait Chamber of Commerce & Industry and founding member of the Kuwait Red Crescent Society.
- 20 February - Basel Al-Rashed, (aged 54) former MP.
- 25 February – Mashari Al-Ballam, actor (b. 1971).
- 26 February - Salah Al-Eidan, (aged 51), renowned car racer.
- 12 March - Khaled Al-Deyain, Interior Ministry Assistant Undersecretary for Services' affairs, died due to COVID-19.
- 29 March – Abeer Al Khader, actress.
- 13 April – Jamal Al-Qabendi, footballer, former Kazma Club & Kuwaiti national team (b. 1959).
- 26 April - Abdulrazaq Al-Adsani, (aged 85) writer & poet.
- 21 May - Major Abdulaziz Saud Al Dawas, firefighter, died in the line of duty belonging to Salmiya Fire Station.
- 10 June - Sheikh Mansour Al-Ahmad Al-Jaber Al-Sabeh, (aged 79) member of the royal family.
- 12 June - Abdulsalam Maqboul, (aged 68) cartoonist.
- 1 July - Muneera Khaled Al-Mutawwa, philanthropist.
- 5 July - Ali Hussain Al-Sabti, poet.
- 22 July - Jawad Ashor, footballer & referee, former Al-Arabi SC & Kuwait national team.
- 31 July – Intisar Al-Sharrah, actress (b. 1962).
- 2 August - Mubarak Al-Adwani, Former Information Ministry Undersecretary.
- 4 August - Latifa Al Barrak, first female Kuwaiti teacher (third Kuwaiti teacher) (b. 1927).
- 23 August - Sheikha Badriya Al-Ahmad Al-Sabah, member of the royal family.
- 25 August - Sheikh Ali Fahad Al-Salem Al-Sabah (aged 73), member of the royal family.
- 5 September - Dr. Shafiq Al-Ghabra, (aged 68) professor & diplomat.
- 18 September - Abdulmuttaleb Al-Kadhemi, (aged 85) former Oil Minister.
- 22 September - Mohammad Al-Ruwaished, (aged 65) composer.
- 8 October - Faisal Al-Hajji Bukhadour, former information minister & state minister for cabinet affairs, former ambassador, advisor at the Primer Minister's Diwan. (b. 1946)
- 14 October - Saif Marzouq Al-Shamlan, (aged 94) historian & writer, contributed to documenting Kuwait's history.
- 15 October - Khaled Al-Siddiq, Director. (b. 1945)
- 10 November - Mohammad Al-Asousi, former National Council for Culture, Arts & Letters (NCCAL) Assistant Secretary General.
- 17 November - Marzouq Saeed, footballer, former Al-Arabi SC & national Football team.
- 29 November - Abdulaziz Al-Dousari, founder of Kuwait Credit Bank.
- 11 December - Sheikh Duaij Khalifah Al-Abdullah Al-Khalifah Al-Sabah, poet. (b. 1971)
- 20 December - Saad Waleed, footballer, former Jahra SC * Kuwait National team. (b. 1992)
