= 2017 in Kuwait =

- Decades: 1990s; 2000s; 2010s; 2020s
- See also: Other events of 2017; List of years in Kuwait; Timeline of Kuwaiti history

Events in the year 2017 in Kuwait.

== Incumbents ==
- Emir: Sabah Al-Ahmad Al-Jaber Al-Sabah
- Prime Minister: Jaber Al-Mubarak Al-Hamad Al-Sabah

== Deaths ==
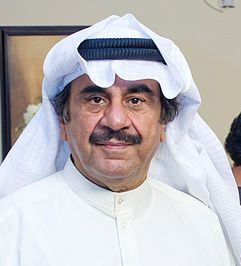
Abdulhussain Abdulredha

- 4 January – Hisham Al-Otaibi, politician (b. 1946).
- 3 August – Souad Al-Humaidhi, businesswoman (b. 1939).
- 11 August – Abdulhussain Abdulredha, actor (b. 1939).
