= Abdulhussain Abdulredha =

Kuwaiti actor and writer

- عبد الحسين عبد الرضا
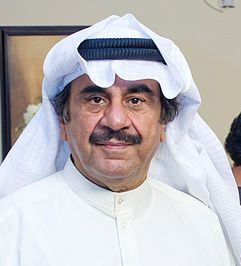
- Abdulredha in 2009
- Born: Abdulhussain Abdulredha Mohammed Awad; 15 July 1939; Sharq, Protectorate of Kuwait
- Died: 11 August 2017 (aged 78); London, England
- Other name: Abo Adnan
- Occupations: Actor, writer
- Years active: 1960–2017
- Title: The father of comedy, icon comedy
- Awards: Arab League Award for Pioneer in Theatre; Award for Theatre Star, Kuwait (1980); Award for Entrepreneurship in Theatre, Tunisia (1987); Award for Pioneer of Arabic Theatre, Cairo (1988); Sultan Bin Al Owais Award for Arabic Artistic Creativity, (1997)

Abdulhussain Abdulredha (Arabic: عبد الحسين عبد الرضا, romanized: ʿAbd al-Ḥussain ʿAbd ar-Riḍā; 15 July 1939 – 11 August 2017) was a Kuwaiti actor.

== Background ==
Abdulredha was born in Derwazat Al Abdulrazzaq, Al-Awazem village in Sharq, Kuwait, to 'Ajam of Kuwait parents. He was the seventh among 14 siblings.

He initially worked in the Department of Printing, which is now the Ministry of Information and Culture. In 1956, he traveled to Egypt on a ministry-sponsored mission to learn the art of printmaking. In 1961, he traveled to Germany on another mission to complete his studies in printmaking. He continued in this role until he became an observer in the Printing Section of the Ministry of Information.

== Personal life ==
He married four wives and has three daughters and two sons, among them Bashar and Adnan, who works in the technical field and has attempted to write poetry and the preparation of TV programs, as well as Mona, Bebe, and Manal.

== Assassination attempt ==
After the liberation of Kuwait, the art scene saw a lot of drama about the Iraqi invasion. Abdulredha presented a play called Sword of the Arabs in 1992, addressing the period of the invasion. He survived an assassination attempt on his way to one of the performances by the suspected Iraqi Intelligence Service.

== Death ==
On 11 August 2017, Abdulredha died of heart attack in the Royal Brompton Hospital in London, aged 78. His funeral was held in the afternoon of 16 August 2017, in Kuwait. He died in a city that he used as a name for one of his most popular comedies called "Bye Bye London", which was about Kuwaiti people who travel to London and try to settle there.

== Filmography ==
=== TV series ===
Year of Production	Series	Participation
1977	Darb Alzalaq	Saad Al Faraj, Ali Al-Mufidi, Khalid Al-Nafisi, Abdul Aziz al-Nimesh
1977	Fate	Saad Al Faraj, Abdul Aziz al-Nimesh, Ghanem Al-Saleh
1981	Tutorial	Souad Abdullah, Ibrahim Sallal, Maryam Saleh, Hayat Al-Fahad
2009	Big Love	Ibrahim Harbi, Badriya Ahmed, Ahmed Al-Salman

=== Cinema ===
Year of Production	Movie name	Participation
1965	Storm	Khalid Al-Nafisi

== Gala and achievements ==
- 2010: Kuwait – Honoring Festival Medley.
- 2010: Jordan – Honor award from Jordan Arab Media Festival.
