= 2022 in Kuwait =

- Decades: 2000s; 2010s; 2020s
- See also: Other events of 2022; List of years in Kuwait; Timeline of Kuwaiti history

Events in the year 2022 in Kuwait.

== Incumbents ==
Photo	Post	Name
	Emir of Kuwait	Nawaf Al-Ahmad Al-Jaber Al-Sabah
	Prime Minister of Kuwait	Sabah Al-Khalid Al-Sabah (Until 19 July)
	Prime Minister of Kuwait	Ahmad Nawaf Al-Ahmad Al-Sabah (Starting 24 July)

== Events ==
Ongoing — COVID-19 pandemic in Kuwait

=== February ===
- 17 February – The Kuwaiti Ministers of Defense and the Interior, both members of the ruling Al-Sabah family, resign. The resignations are accepted by the Emir, who appoints a different member of the Al-Sabah family and Mohammad al-Fares, the current Oil Minister, to their respective posts.

=== March ===
- 26 March – Saudi Arabia and Kuwait sign off on a 50-year program to explore the Arash gas field, which is located on the maritime border between the two countries and also extends into Iranian waters. Iran says that the deal is illegal.

=== May ===
- 10 May – Crown Prince of Kuwait Mishal Al-Ahmad Al-Jaber Al-Sabah accepts the resignation of the Government of Kuwait, after the request had been submitted more than a month ago. No timeline is given for when the next election will occur.

=== September ===
- 29 September – General elections were held in Kuwait following the dissolution of parliament by Crown Prince Mishal Al-Ahmad Al-Jaber Al-Sabah.

=== November ===
- 16 November – Kuwait says that it has carried out a mass execution of seven convicted murderers, including three foreign citizens.

== Deaths ==
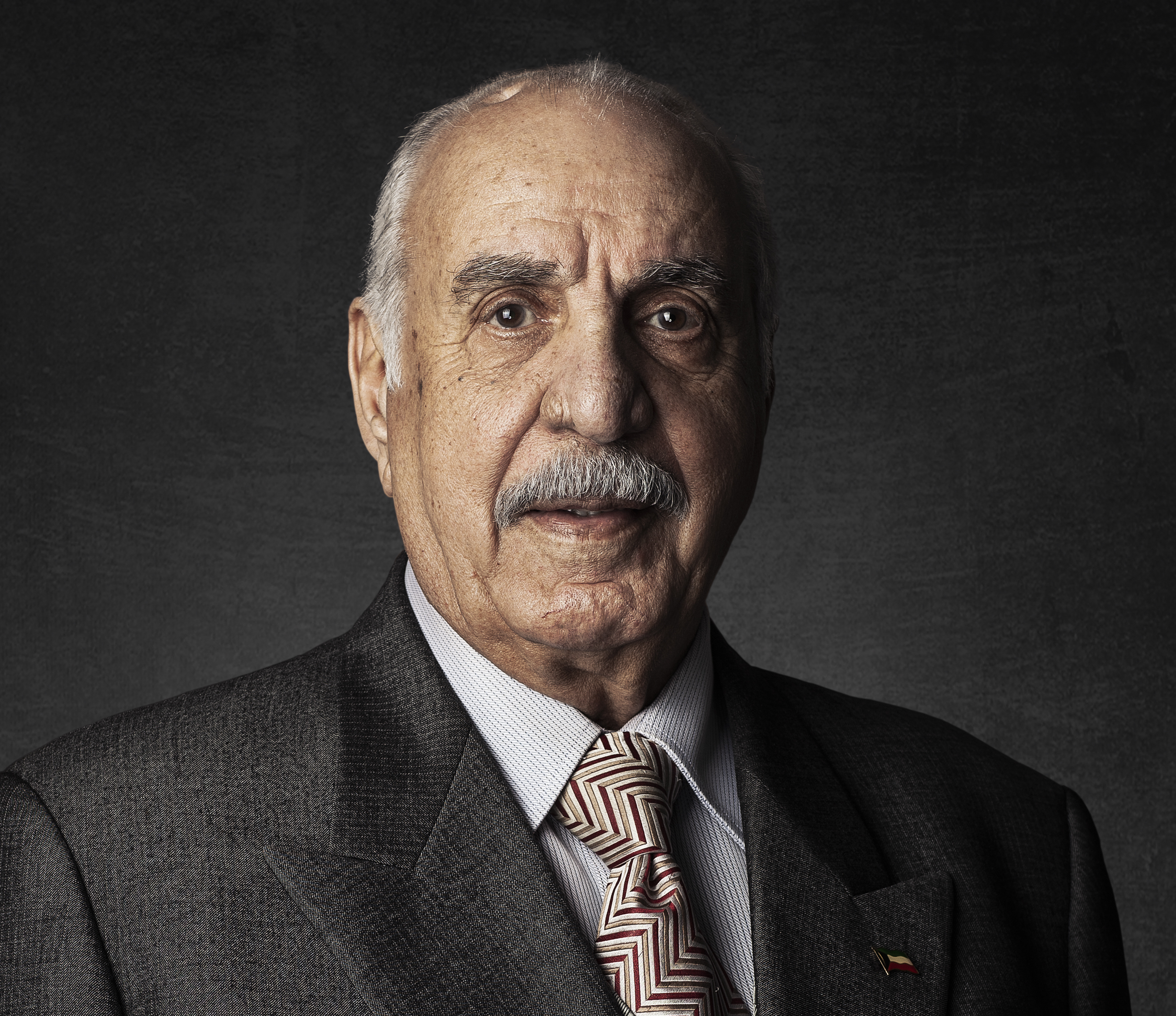
Mohammed Al-Sanousi

- 13 January – Youssef Al-Qatami, (aged 73), plastic artist and member of the Kuwaiti Society for Fine Arts.
- 10 February – Dr. Saleh Mohammad Al-Ojairi, (aged 101) astronomer, founder of astronomy in Kuwait and the region.
- 6 March – Dr. Ahmad Al-Khatib, (aged 95) first surgeon of Kuwait (1952), ex-Member of Parliament (political career 1963–1996).
- 8 March – Ghannam Al-Jumhur Al-Mutairi, (aged 91), former National Assembly MP
- 13 March – Marzouq Abdul Wahhab Al-Marzouq, (aged 100), former member of the Municipal Council and a member of the board of Directors of the National bank.
- 20 March – Abdllah Al-Nibari, (aged 85), former politician and parliamentarian.
- 30 May – Aziza Muhammad Al-Bassam, (aged 84), educator and founder of first public library for women in Kuwait.
- 20 July – Suleiman Al-Mulla, (aged 69), artist.
- 13 August – Amer Al-Sahloul, journalist and founders of the Diwaniya of Nabat Poets.
- 17 August – Abdul Rahman Khaled Saleh Al-Ghuneim, (aged 84), former Minister of Communications.
- 30 August – Abdullah Al-Awadi, Director.
- 12 October – Dr. Fakhri Ahmed Shehab, contributor towards setting the frameworks of the country's economic system.
- 3 November – Saleh Al-Rajeeb, director and host of Kuwait Radio.
- 15 November – Mohammed Al-Sanousi, (aged 84) former Minister.
- 30 November - Muhammad Youssef Al-Adsani, former speaker of the National Assembly, pioneers of political and parliamentary work in the country.
- 19 December – Khalaf Al-Enezi, (aged 76) former National Assembly MP
- 19 December – Hilal Mashari Al-Mutairi, (aged 80), former Minister
