= 2020 in Kuwait =

- Decades: 2000s; 2010s; 2020s
- See also: Other events of 2020; List of years in Kuwait; Timeline of Kuwaiti history

Events of 2020 in Kuwait.

== Incumbents ==
- Emir: Sabah Al-Ahmad Al-Jaber Al-Sabah (until 29 September), Nawaf Al-Ahmad Al-Jaber Al-Sabah (from 30 September)
- Prime Minister: Sabah Al-Khalid Al-Sabah

== Events ==
Ongoing – COVID-19 pandemic in Kuwait

=== January ===
- 7 January – Canada's Chief of the Defence Staff General Jonathan Vance announces that some of its military personnel in Iraq will be moved to neighboring Kuwait for safety reasons.
- 8 January – Kuwaiti state news agency KUNA says its official Twitter account was hacked after it spread a fake news report that the United States Army would withdraw from Camp Arifjan within three days.

=== February ===
- 24 February – The country, along with Iraq, Afghanistan, Oman and Bahrain, confirmed its first cases of COVID-19.

=== April ===
- 4 April – The first death from COVID-19 is reported in the country as cases reach 479.

=== July ===
- 6 July – Kuwait surpasses 50,000 infections after reporting 538 new cases in the past 24 hours. Its death toll jumps to 373.
- 18 July – Emir Sabah Al-Ahmad Al-Jaber Al-Sabah is admitted to hospital for what aides described as "routine" medical tests. Crown Prince Nawaf Al-Ahmad Al-Jaber Al-Sabah, the Emir's 83-year-old half-brother and designated successor, will temporarily carry out some of the Emir's duties.
- 19 July – Emir Sabah Al-Ahmad Al-Jaber Al-Sabah, age 91, undergoes successful surgery and medical treatment. Crown Prince Nawaf Al-Ahmad Al-Jaber Al-Sabah, who is 83, temporarily assumes some of the powers and will maintain such powers until "the health event is over."
- 23 July – The 91-year-old Emir of Kuwait Sabah Al-Ahmad Al-Jaber Al-Sabah flies to the United States to seek further medical treatment after undergoing successful surgery days ago.

=== August ===
- 1 August – The Kuwaiti Directorate General of Civil Aviation bans flights to 31 countries as Kuwait International Airport resumes operations at reduced capacity.

== Deaths ==
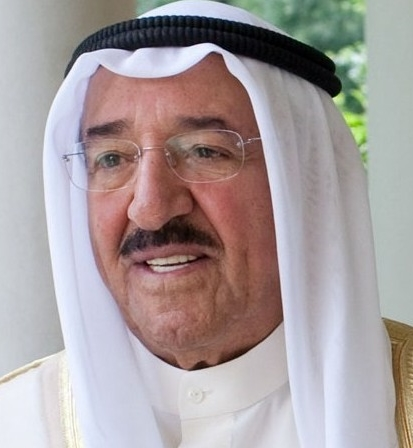
Sabah Al-Ahmad

- 29 September – Sabah Al-Ahmad Al-Jaber Al-Sabah, the 15th Ruler of Kuwait and the 6th Emir of the State of Kuwait, (b. 1929)
- 20 December – Nasser Sabah Al-Ahmad Al-Sabah, first Deputy Prime Minister and Minister of Defense, (b. 1948)

== See also ==
- List of years in Kuwait
- 2020 in Kuwait
