= 2027 in Kuwait =

- Decades: 2000s; 2010s; 2020s
- See also: Other events of 2027; List of years in Kuwait; Timeline of Kuwaiti history

Events in the year 2027 in Kuwait.

== Events ==
=== Predicted or scheduled ===
- 2027 Men's Ice Hockey World Championships Division IV Group A

== Holidays ==
- 1 January – New Year's Day
- 6 January – The Prophet's Ascension
- 25 February – National Day
- 26 February – Liberation Day
- 10 March – 19 March – Eid al-Fitr
- 16 May – Arafat Day
- 17– 19 May – Eid al-Adha
- 6 June – Islamic New Year
- 15 August – The Prophet's Birthday
