= Saif al-Arab =

Saif al-Arab may refer to:

- Saif al-Arab Gaddafi (1982–2011), son of Libyan leader Muammar Gaddafi
- Saif al-Arab (play), a 1992 Kuwaiti play

== See also ==
- Sayf El Arab (1980 – after 1998), American-bred Thoroughbred racehorse
