= 2023 in Kuwait =

- Decades: 2000s; 2010s; 2020s
- See also: Other events of 2023; List of years in Kuwait; Timeline of Kuwaiti history

Events in the year 2023 in Kuwait.

== Incumbents ==
Photo	Post	Name
	Emir of Kuwait	Nawaf Al-Ahmad Al-Jaber Al-Sabah (Until 16 December)
	Emir of Kuwait	Mishal Al-Ahmad Al-Jaber Al-Sabah (Starting 16 December)
	Prime Minister of Kuwait	Ahmad Nawaf Al-Ahmad Al-Sabah

== Holidays ==
- 1 January – Sunday – New Year's Day
- 19 February – Sunday – The Prophet's Ascension
- 25 February – Saturday – National Day
- 26 February – Sunday – Liberation Day
- 27 February – Monday – Public Sector & Bank Holiday in lieu of Kuwait National Day
- 21–25 April – Eid al-Fitr
- 27 June – Tuesday – Arafat Day
- 28–30 June – Eid al-Adha
- 1–2 July – Eid al-Adha
- 20 July – Thursday – Islamic New Year (In lieu of Wednesday 19 July)
- 28 September – Thursday – The Prophet's Birthday
- 17–19 December – Mourning for Sheikh Nawaf Al-Ahmad Al-Jaber Al-Sabah
- 31 December – Sunday – Public Sector & Bank Holiday in lieu of New Year's Day 2024

== Events ==
=== March ===
- 19 March – The Constitutional Court ruled in favour of reinstating the previous parliament elected in 2020, citing discrepancies in the decree dissolving the previous parliament.

=== June ===
- 6 June - 2023 Kuwaiti general election: Kuwaitis return to the ballots again for the third time in three years following the second dissolution of the 16th session by Crown Prince Mishal Al-Ahmad Al-Jaber Al-Sabah.
- 18 June – Kuwaiti Prime Minister Ahmad Nawaf Al-Ahmad Al-Sabah forms the 44th Cabinet following his reappointment, appointing Ahmed Al-Fahad Al-Ahmed Al-Sabah as the defense minister and Saad Al Barrak as the oil minister.

=== July ===
- 27 July – Kuwait executes five by hanging, including man convicted over ISIS mosque bombing in 2015 that had killed 26 people.

=== October ===
- 30 October – An Indian nurse from the Al Sabah Hospital was deported by the Kuwaiti government for her pro-Israel stance and calling Palestinians "terrorists".

=== November ===
- 26 November – Kuwait's highest court sentences former defense and interior minister Khaled Al Jarrah Al Sabah to seven years in prison for mishandling military funds while former Prime Minister Jaber Al-Mubarak Al-Hamad Al-Sabah, who faced similar charges, is only ordered by the court to return the funds that he mismanaged.

=== December ===
- 16 December –
  - Emir of Kuwait Nawaf Al-Ahmad Al-Jaber Al-Sabah dies at 86. His half-brother, Crown Prince Mishal Al-Ahmad Al-Jaber Al-Sabah, succeeds him as the new emir.
  - The government announced three-days holiday across the country and 40 days mourning with flags lowered at half-mast. Malls and Complexes were closed from 16th to 18th, other than essentials. Ministry and State Institutions had holidays from 17th to 19th. Flags lowered at half-mast at all ministries, state agencies and main roads for a 40 day period.
- 20 December –
  - Sheikh Mishal Al-Ahmad Al-Jaber Al-Sabah took oath at a special National Assembly session becoming the 17th Emir of the State of Kuwait.
  - Emir Sheikh Mishal Al-Ahmad Al-Jaber Al-Sabah receives government resignation from Prime Minister Sheikh Ahmad Nawaf Al-Ahmad Al-Sabah.

== Deaths ==
- 26 February – Ali Al-Baghli (aged 75), politician
- 6 April — Saad Zenefer Al-Azmi (aged 73), former National Assembly member (2009-2011)
- 12 May - Abdulkareem Abdulqadir (aged 81), singer
- 25 May – Ahmad Johar (aged 65), actor
- 27 August – Sheikh Khaled Al-Saeedi, Imam of the Grand Mosque of Kuwait
- 15 December – Abdulaziz Saud Al-Babtain (aged 87), poet, writer and businessman
- 16 December – Nawaf Al-Ahmad Al-Jaber Al-Sabah (aged 86), the 16th Ruler of Kuwait and the 7th Emir of the State of Kuwait, (b. 1937)
