= 2018 in Kuwait =

- Decades: 1990s; 2000s; 2010s; 2020s
- See also: Other events of 2018; List of years in Kuwait; Timeline of Kuwaiti history

Events in the year 2018 in Kuwait.

== Incumbents ==
- Emir: Sabah Al-Ahmad Al-Jaber Al-Sabah
- Prime Minister: Jaber Al-Mubarak Al-Hamad Al-Sabah

== Events ==
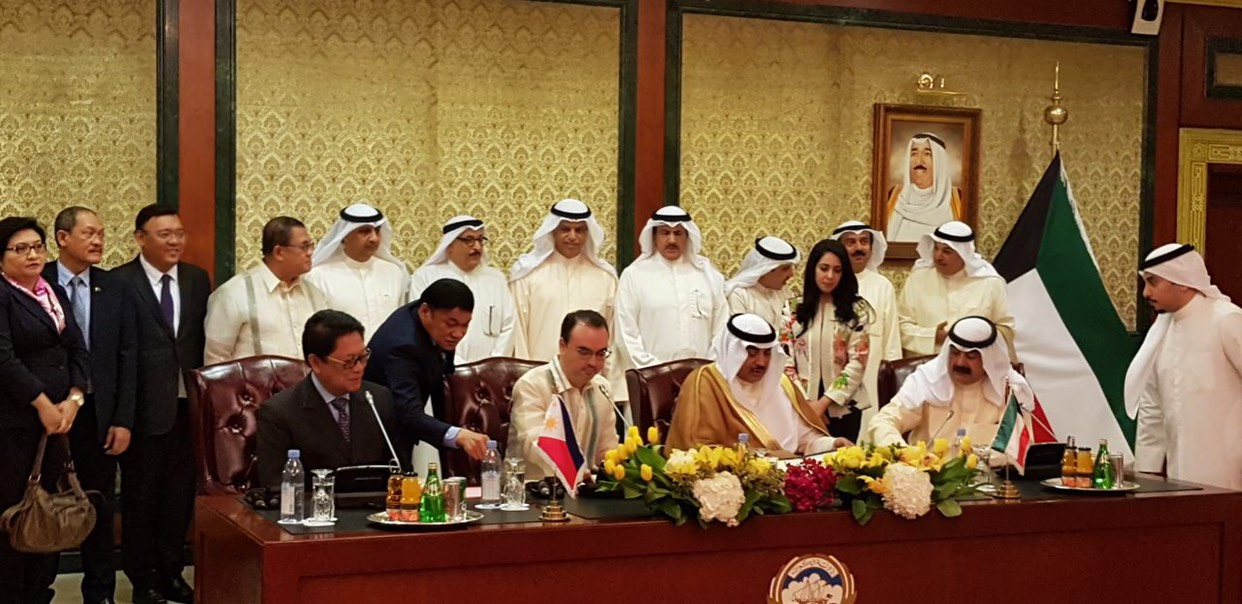
Signing of the "Agreement on the Employment of Domestic Workers" between Kuwait and the Philippines, in the aftermath of the 2018 Kuwait–Philippine diplomatic crisis.

- January to May – A diplomatic crisis developed between the countries of Kuwait and the Philippines over concerns of the latter over the situation of Filipino migrant workers in Kuwait.
- May 29 – Kuwait blocks draft United Nation Security Council US sanction attack on Israel.

== Deaths ==
- 7 January – Meshary Al-Arada, singer and composer (b. 1982).
- 12 August – Frayha Al-Ahmad, Kuwaiti royalty (b. 1944).
- 25 September – Ismail Fahd Ismail, novelist (b. 1940).
