= 2019 in Kuwait =

- Decades: 1990s; 2000s; 2010s; 2020s
- See also: Other events of 2019; List of years in Kuwait; Timeline of Kuwaiti history

Events of 2019 in Kuwait.

== Incumbents ==
- Emir: Sabah Al-Ahmad Al-Jaber Al-Sabah
- Prime Minister: Jaber Al-Mubarak Al-Hamad Al-Sabah

== Events ==
=== November ===
- 14 November – The Prime Minister Sheikh Jaber Al-Mubarak Al-Hamed Al-Sabah tendered resignation of his cabinet to His Highness the Amir Sheikh Sabah Al-Ahmad Al-Jaber Al-Sabah.

=== December ===
- 17 December – The formation of the new Kuwaiti cabinet.
