= 2016 in Kuwait =

- Decades: 1990s; 2000s; 2010s; 2020s
- See also: Other events of 2016; List of years in Kuwait; Timeline of Kuwaiti history

Events in the year 2016 in Kuwait.

== Incumbents ==
- Emir: Sabah Al-Ahmad Al-Jaber Al-Sabah
- Prime Minister: Jaber Al-Mubarak Al-Hamad Al-Sabah

== Events ==
- 22 April – representatives from the government of Yemen and from Houthi rebels met in Bayan Palace in Kuwait City in an effort to negotiate a resolution to the Yemeni civil war.
- 24 June – Kuwait announced that it would sue the International Olympic Committee $1 billion for blocking athletes from competing in the 2016 Summer Olympics under the Kuwaiti flag due to alleged government interference in sports.
- 21 July – Temperatures in Mitrabah reached 54.0 °C (129.2 °F), setting a record for highest temperature recorded in Asia.
- 8 October – An Egyptian national rammed an explosives-laden garbage truck into a vehicle containing three American soldiers on a Kuwait City highway in "an attempted terrorist attack"; the Americans, unharmed, then saved the Egyptian from his burning vehicle.
- 16 October – Emir Sabah Al-Ahmad Al-Jaber Al-Sabah dissolved the Kuwait government and set new elections.
- 26 November – General elections held. Opposition candidates won 24 of the 50 seats in the National Assembly.
- 21 December – after the victory of Donald Trump in the 2016 United States presidential election, the ambassador of Kuwait moved its annual Kuwaiti National Day event to the Trump International Hotel Washington DC.

== Deaths ==
- 4 October – Ibrahim Al-Soula, composer (b. 1935).
