= Saif al-Arab (play) =

Kuwaiti satirical political play

- Film poster of Saif al-Arab
- Original title: سيف العرب
- Directed by: Ruqayah al-Koot
- Written by: Hayat Al-Fahad
- Starring: Abdulhussain Abdulredha
- Release date: 1992
- Running time: 240 minutes
- Country: Kuwait
- Language: Arabic

Saif al-Arab (Arabic: سيف العرب, romanized: Saif Al-‘arab, lit. 'Sword of the Arabs'), is a Kuwaiti political satire play made to entertain the citizens of Kuwait during the Gulf War. The play's success inspired several other plays about occupation, liberation, and social changes. It was originally performed at the Dasma Theater in 1992. It is played every Eid al-Fitr in Kuwait.

== Plot and production ==
The plot of the play was to show the life of the average Kuwaiti citizen during the Iraqi invasion of Kuwait and what it was like to live in Kuwait during Saddam Hussein's occupation of the country.

Directed by Ruqayah al-Koot, and written by Abdulhussain Abdulredha from an idea by Hayat Al Fahad, it is a 4-hour play starring Abdulhussain Abdulredha as Saddam Hussein.

== Legacy ==
In 2018, Gulf News described the play's depiction of Saddam Hussein as "searing". In 2024, Fatima Al-Yousef, writing for Al Ra'i, described the film as a "significant turning point in the history of Kuwaiti theater". In 2025, Tariq Al-Khadri of Al Qabas described the film as "not just a satirical comedy show, but an artistic weapon to confront tyranny".

An assassination attempt was made by Saddam Hussein against Abdulredha for his depiction of Hussein in the play, however it was unsuccessful. In July 2025, a new version of the play was announced to be played at the Sharq Association theatre for the 33rd anniversary of the Iraqi Invasion of Kuwait, however it was cancelled a few days later and replaced with Bye Bye London by request of the Minister of Information out of concern for the "greater good and the geopolitical situation".

== See also ==
- Team America: World Police
- Three Kings
- The Men Who Stare at Goats
