= Mohammed Al Manea =

Kuwaiti actor (1930–2025)

- محمد المنيع
- Born: 1 June 1930; Kuwait
- Died: 8 August 2025 (aged 95)
- Occupation: Actor
- Years active: 1963–2025

Mohammed Al Manea (Arabic: محمد المنيع; 1 June 1930 – 8 August 2025) was a Kuwaiti actor.

== Life and career ==
Al Manea was born on 1 June 1930. He began his acting career in 1963. He participated in several soap operas in Kuwait.

Towards the end of his life, al Manea struggled with a health battle which led to a decline in his liver and kidney function. He died on 8 August 2025, at the age of 95.

== Filmography ==
=== Film ===
- bass ya bahar (1972)
- la thaman lliwatan (1991)

=== Television ===
- al firya (2006)
