= Hisham Al-Otaibi =

Kuwaiti politician

Minister of Finance
- In office 1998–1999

Personal details
- Born: 1946
- Died: 4 January 2017 (aged 70)
- Education: University of Oklahoma

Hisham Al-Otaibi (1946 – 4 January 2017) was a Kuwaiti politician who served as the Minister of Finance and Industry from 1998 to 1999.

Al-Otaibi was born in 1946. He received a Bachelor of Science in engineering from the University of Oklahoma.

He served as the Director General of the Kuwait Stock Exchange during the 1990s. Hisham Al-Otaibi then became Minister of Finance and Industry, a position he held from 1998 until 1999. Additionally, Al-Otaibi held positions in a number of Kuwaiti, British and international firms and organizations, including the Kuwait Drilling Company and the Kuwait International Investment Company.

Hisham Al-Otaibi died on 4 January 2017, at the age of 70.
