= Bye Bye London =

Satirical comedy Arabic play

Bye Bye London (Arabic: باي باي لندن) is a Kuwaiti play written by Abdulhussain Abdulredha and directed by Munsif Al-Suwaisi and Kazem Al-Qallaf. It premiered on November 18, 1981. The cast included Abdulhussain Abdulredha, Ghanem Al-Saleh, Haifa Adel, Maryam Al Ghadhban and Mohammed Jaber. Dawood Hussein and Intisar Al-Sharrah also appeared in the production.

The play is a satirical comedy that uses a trip to London as the setting for its treatment of cultural and social differences. Its plot deals with encounters between Arab visitors and British society, as well as differences between traditional and modern attitudes.

It combines comedy with social commentary, addressing differences in attitudes and behavior between Arab visitors and the societies they encounter in London. The production continued to be performed for several months after its premiere; Abdulhussain Abdulredha later said that it remained on stage for more than five months. The play's setting in London allowed its comedy to address encounters between Gulf audiences and Western society.

On July 31, 2021, Intisar Al-Sharrah, who appeared in the play as Samira, died in London after receiving medical treatment there. Abdulhussain Abdulredha, the play's writer and lead actor, died in London on August 11, 2017, after being hospitalized there. Their co-star Ghanem Al-Saleh died in London on October 19, 2010, after being treated for lung cancer.

== Background ==
During the late 1970s and early 1980s, London was a popular destination for visitors from the Gulf. The city was associated with shopping, entertainment and other aspects of Western urban life, providing a setting for encounters between Gulf visitors and unfamiliar social customs.

Satirical theatre had a significant presence in Arab popular culture during this period. Egyptian productions such as Madraset El Moshaghbeen (The School of Mischief), Shahed Ma Shafsh Haga (A Witness Who Saw Nothing), and Al 'Eyal Kebret (The Kids Have Grown Up) remained widely known in the Arabic-speaking world decades after their original productions. Jadaliyya's discussion of these plays links their popularity to their use of comedy alongside criticism of political and social conditions in the Arab world. The same article notes the growth of forms of online satire in the Arab world, particularly in the Arabian Peninsula, where public political expression has faced restrictions.

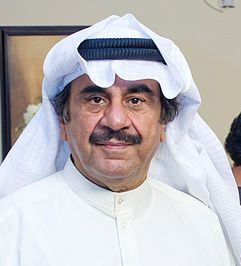
Abdulhussain Abdulredha in 2009

These satirical plays were largely produced in Egypt during the Infitah era under President Anwar Sadat. The plays discussed by Jadaliyya addressed themes including social change, political helplessness, family relations and individualism.

A similar type of satirical theatre developed in Kuwait in the decade following the 1973-74 oil boom. Jadaliyya links this period to changes in the political and economic life of the Gulf, including the weakening of Arab nationalist politics and the rapid growth of oil wealth. Kuwaiti playwrights used comedy to address the tensions associated with these changes.

Bye Bye London was among the Kuwaiti plays discussed in this context. Its characters were presented as exaggerated versions of Arab visitors to London. The play included Shaared, a wealthy Kuwaiti businessman concerned with his health while staying in London; Nahhash, a Saudi arms dealer; Adam, a hotel manager; Sabeeka, Shaared's wife; and L'arbi, a Moroccan immigrant living in Europe. Through these characters, the play satirizes consumerism, social pretensions and the behavior of wealthy Gulf visitors abroad. Jadaliyya also interprets the play as a critique of political and social conditions in the Arab world at the time.

== Plot summary ==
The plot of Bye Bye London revolves around Shard bin Juma (Arabic: شارد بن جمعة, played by Abdulhussain Abdulredha), a wealthy Gulf Arab man who travels to London in search of leisure, luxury, and adventure. He is fascinated by the city's opulence and modernity but quickly finds himself in absurd situations due to his lack of understanding of British customs and norms.

Shard goes to London to escape from his family and his wife in particular, and he wants to meet girls and make friends without his wife knowing. He is welcomed by his nephew Safi (portrayed by Dawood Hussein), who is studying in London and makes every effort to protect him from being scammed while in the city. As Shard interacts with the locals and fellow Arabs in London, he begins to confront the stark differences in lifestyle between Gulf Arab traditions and Western culture. From his attempts at communication with the locals to his confusion about the pace and customs of British life, the play offers a series of comedic moments that highlight the cultural misunderstandings between East and West.

In one notable scene, Shard tries to order food in a London bar, only to find himself lost amid unfamiliar dishes and etiquette. His bemusement with the menu, along with his interactions with the waitstaff, underscores how the simplest tasks can become overwhelming when two cultures clash. There he meets Nahash the mountain boy (Arabic: نهّاش فتى الجبل, played by Ghanem Al-Saleh) and a person named El-L’arbi El-Siddiq (Arabic: العربي الصّديق, played by Dawood Hussein) from Morocco. In this scene, the trio performs the song "Al-Harami Ma Yemoutshi," an old Moroccan song from the Moorish heritage, lamenting the fall of Andalusia (modern-day Spain) from the hands of the Muslims. It also tells the story of the Muslims who migrated from Andalusia to Morocco, particularly after the fall of Granada. The lyrics reflect the era of the atrocities committed during the Spanish Inquisition.

The play also features a cast of supporting characters, including other Gulf Arabs living or traveling in London. These characters add depth to the narrative, as each of them represents a different facet of the Gulf's relationship with the West—some are eager to embrace the new culture, while others are more skeptical or critical of the West's influence on Arab identity. The ensemble cast's interactions serve to expose not only the misunderstandings between Gulf Arabs and the British but also the generational and class divides within Arab society itself. The play is not without symbolism, political and social allegories, and criticism of certain Arab situations.

== Characters ==
- Abdulhussain Abdulredha as Shard bin Juma: The protagonist, a wealthy Gulf Arab man traveling to London. His character represents the fascination with Western culture that many Gulf Arabs felt at the time, as well as the challenges of navigating an unfamiliar environment.
- Ghanem Al-Saleh as Nahash The Mountain Boy: One of Shard's friends, who serves as a counterbalance to Shard's enthusiasm for Western culture. He is more cautious and grounded, often pointing out the absurdity of Shard's actions.
- Intisar Al-Sharrah as Auntie Samira (Al-Khala): A comedic elderly character. She is Shard's wife, who embodies traditional values and provides a humorous contrast to Shard's attempts to assimilate into Western society. Her conservative views create amusing situations as she tries to navigate modern London life.
- Dawood Hussein as Safi - El-L’arbi El-Siddiq - Franco
- Haifa Adel as Wafa' - Janet - Francesca
- Maryam Al-Ghadhban as Sabeeka
- Mohamed Jaber as Adam

== Themes ==
=== Cultural Clash and Identity ===
The play's central theme is the clash of cultures, focusing on how Gulf Arabs, represented by Shard, grapple with Western ways of life. The character's confusion, embarrassment, and humorous mishaps are rooted in the vast cultural differences between the conservative, family-oriented Gulf society and the liberal, individualistic culture of London. The play critiques both sides, using humor to point out the absurdities of trying to fit into a foreign culture without fully understanding it.

=== Modernity vs. Tradition ===
"Bye Bye London" also reflects the tensions between modernity and tradition, a key issue in many Gulf countries during the late 20th century. As these societies began to experience rapid economic growth due to oil wealth, they were exposed to Western culture through media, travel, and trade. This exposure led to questions about how to balance tradition with modernity, a dilemma that Shard and other characters in the play face. The play doesn't provide clear answers but instead highlights the complexity of this balancing act.

=== Reveling in Charades ===
The play presents a convoluted plot but a clear theme, focusing on the hedonistic exploits of wealthy Arab visitors in London, who are preyed upon by the city's schemers. At a hotel bar, Shaared and his Saudi friend Nahhash bond over chauvinistic complaints about their wives, indulging in misogynistic humor. As they revel in gambling, alcohol, and the company of prostitutes, their self-satisfaction begins to crumble. The hotel manager, Adam, conspires with escorts to blackmail the guests, exposing their vulnerabilities. The facade of Arab male bravado falls apart, revealing two lonely, middle-aged men who realize their wealth grants them little more than fleeting pleasures. Shaared, however, recognizes the emptiness of their excess, occasionally undercutting their indulgences. The play satirizes the arrogance and privilege of Arab men, much like an early Michael Moore might target foolishness and excess in his work.

=== Social Satire ===
Abdulhussain Abdulredha was known for his ability to use satire to address sensitive social issues. In "Bye Bye London," he critiques the behavior of wealthy Gulf Arabs who, dazzled by Western luxuries, often forget their roots. The play satirizes the way some Arabs adopt Western habits superficially, without truly understanding the cultural context behind them. Shard's interactions with British locals are laced with humorous misunderstandings, but they also offer a deeper commentary on the challenges of cross-cultural exchange.

=== Facing the Tragedy, Mocking the Farce ===
The scene shifts from the indulgent antics of Arab men to a more profound commentary on political impotence, centering around Palestine. Nahhash, the Bedouin arms dealer in bright yellow robes, is sold a shipment of absurdly advanced weapons by Adam, the hotel manager. The weapon system promises total destruction of any spot on a map with minimal effort, yet the demonstration involves a harmless plastic toy gun—a biting reference to the bogus weapons Arab armies were sold during the 1948 Nakba. Nahhash and Shaared consider various targets before settling on Israel, believing that its destruction would liberate them all. However, when they pull the trigger, the result is a mocking fart, highlighting the futility of their aspirations. This darkly comic scene underscores the Arab world's desire to defeat Israel, juxtaposed against their complete helplessness. The phallic toy becomes a cruel metaphor for their impotence, reflecting the irony that, despite possessing the "ultimate weapon" of oil wealth, Arabs remained politically powerless in the 1970s.
