= Energy in Kuwait =

Energy in Kuwait describes energy and electricity production, consumption, import and export in Kuwait.

Kuwait was 9. top oil producer 2009. Kuwait is a member of OPEC. In four years 2004-2008 the population growth of Kuwait was 11% and the energy export grew 16%. In 2008 the energy export of Kuwait 1 450 TWh was close to the one of Nigeria 1 342 kWh and Iran 1 429 kWh.

Primary energy use in 2009 in Kuwait was 351 TWh and 125 TWh per million persons.

== Overview ==
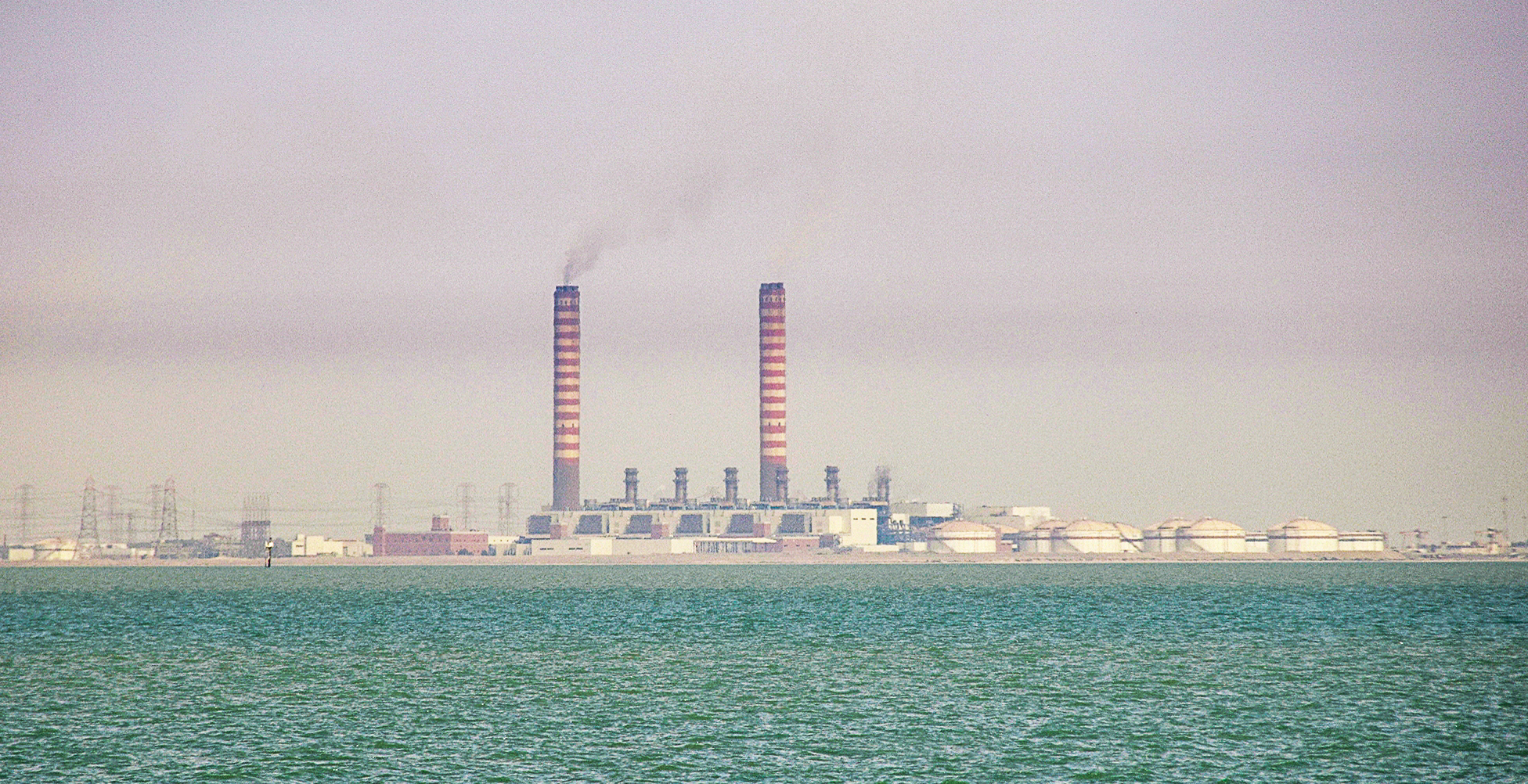
The Subiya oil-fired power plant in Kuwait.

Energy in Kuwait
	Capita	Prim. energy	Production	Export	Electricity	CO_{2}-emission
	Million	TWh	TWh	TWh	TWh	Mt
2004	2.46	292	1,544	1,246	36.8	64.9
2007	2.66	293	1,705	1,398	43.1	66.8
2008	2.73	306	1,777	1,452	45.7	69.5
2009	2.80	351	1,515	1,146	46.6	80.7
2010	2.74	388	1,558	1,159	50.1	87.4
2012	2.82	378	1,795	1,401	50.38	84.74
2012R	3.25	403	2,015	1,591	53.8	91.3
2013	3.37	408	1,983	1,559	53.6	84.1
Change 2004-10	11.4%	33.0%	0.9%	-6.9%	36.3%	34.8%
Mtoe = 11.63 TWh, Prim. energy includes energy losses 2012R = CO2 calculation criteria changed, numbers updated

Production increased 15% from 2004 to 2008.

In relation to population the electricity use in Kuwait in 2008 was more than double compared to Saudi Arabian, Japanese or Danish (Kuwait 45.7 TWh 2.7 million capita. Denmark 35 TWh 5.49 million capita. Japan 1031 TWh 127.7 million capita and Saudi Arabia 187 TWh 24.7 million capita.). The carbon dioxide emissions per capita of Kuwait were 1.6 times compared to Saudi Arabian and 2.8 times compared to Japanese. (Kuwait 69.5 Mt, Saudi Arabia, Japan 1151 Mt)

Advancements in Renewable Energy

In May 2024, the Kuwaiti government took major steps towards bolstering its renewable energy portfolio. The Ministry of Electricity and Water in collaboration with the Kuwait Oil Company (KOC) signed a Memorandum of Understanding to implement a groundbreaking solar energy initiative. The project, aiming to generate 1 gigawatt of electricity through solar power, is being carefully prepared for tender, intending to engage suitable enterprises for implementing the plan. The selected company will procure the energy through a contractual agreement spanning 25 to 30 years. This marks a pivotal step in Kuwait's energy diversification strategy, highlighting the country's expanded ambitions in renewable energy.

== Oil ==
Net oil balance in Kuwait till 2020

According to IEA 10 countries produced over 60% of the world oil production in 2009. The countries were: Russia 494 Mt (13%), Saudi Arabia 452 Mt (12%), US 320 Mt (8%), Iran 206 Mt (5%), China 194 Mt (5%), Canada 152 Mt (4%), Mexico 146 Mt (4%), Venezuela 126 Mt (3%), Kuwait 124 Mt (3%) ja United Arab Emirates 120 Mt (3%).
