= Badr Al-Yaqoub =

Kuwaiti politician (1946–2025)

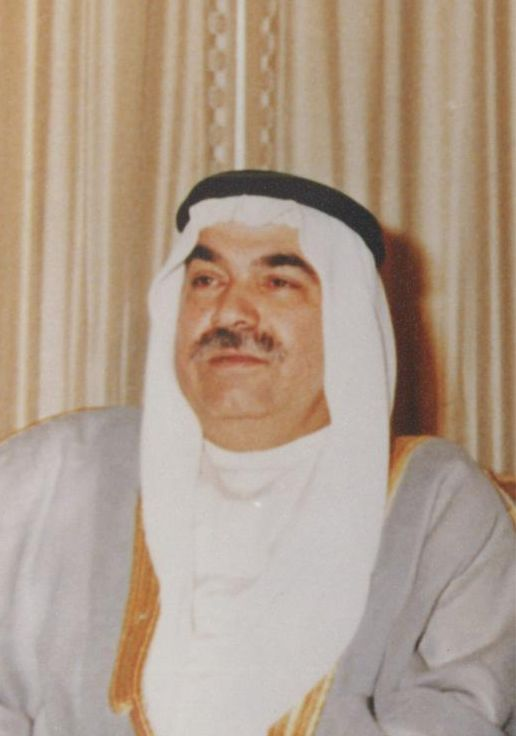
Bader Jassim Mohammad Al-Yaquob
- بدر جاسم محمد اليعقوب

Minister of State for National Council Affairs
- In office June 20, 1990 – November 25, 1990

Minister of Information
- In office November 25, 1990 – October 17, 1992

Personal details
- Born: April 7, 1946 Al-Shuwaikh, Kuwait
- Died: July 1, 2025 Kuwait City, Kuwait
- Spouse: Hussa Mubarak Abdulaziz Al-Hasawi
- Children: 5
- Education: Kuwait University; Cairo University
- Occupation: Academic, Politician, Legal Scholar
- Known for: One of the pioneers of civil law in Kuwait

Bader Jassim Mohammad Al-Yaquob (Arabic: بدر جاسم اليعقوب; April 7, 1946 – July 1, 2025) was a prominent Kuwaiti academic and politician, one of the pioneers of civil law in Kuwait and a professor of law at the Faculty of Law in Kuwait University. He held several governmental positions, including Minister of State for National Council Affairs and Minister of Information, and also served as President of the Kuwaiti Lawyers Association. He was known for his legal writings, which became essential references in the Arab legal library.

== Early life and education ==
Bader Al-Yaquob was born in the Al-Shuwaikh district of Kuwait at dawn on April 7, 1946, and grew up in a well-known Kuwaiti family. He received his primary education at Al-Sharqiya School, then continued his studies at Al-Mutanabbi Intermediate School, followed by Al-Daiya and Al-Shuwaikh Secondary Schools. He obtained a Bachelor’s degree in Law from Kuwait University in 1971. Later, he traveled to Egypt to pursue postgraduate studies at the Faculty of Law, Cairo University, where he earned two diplomas in Private and Public Law in 1973 and 1974. He obtained his PhD in 1977 with the grade of “Very Good with Honors,” for his dissertation titled Liability for the Use of Dangerous Objects in Kuwaiti Law.

== Academic Positions ==
Al-Yaquob began his academic career at the Faculty of Law, Kuwait University, where he held several positions:

- Teaching Assistant, Faculty of Law (1972–1977)
- Lecturer, Faculty of Law (1977–1982)
- Acting Dean of the Faculty of Law and Sharia (1978–1979)
- Head of the Private Law Department (1982–1983)
- Assistant Professor of Civil Law (1982–1988)
- Professor of Civil Law (since 1988)
- Dean of the Faculty of Law and Head of the Private Law Department (2008–2011)

== Governmental and Political Positions ==
Alongside his academic career, Al-Yaquob held several high-ranking governmental and political posts, including:

- Minister of State for National Council Affairs (1990)
- Minister of Information (1990–1992)
- Member of the Supreme Council for Planning and Development (2008)
- Member of the Certificate Equivalency Committee at the Ministry of Higher Education (2010)

== Kuwaiti, Arab, and International Memberships and Committees ==
Al-Yaquob participated in many Kuwaiti, Arab, and international legal committees and organizations. His memberships included:

- Member of the General Committee for Drafting the Kuwaiti Civil Code (1979)
- Member of the Committee for Reviewing the Kuwaiti Civil Code (1979)
- Member of the Kuwaiti Constitution Revision Committee (1981)
- Member of the Arab Union for the Protection of Industrial Property, West Germany
- Member of the Permanent Office of the Union of Arab Jurists
- Member of the Permanent Committee for the Defense of Fundamental Rights and Freedoms in the Arab World (1987)
- Member of the Editorial Board of Al-Huquqi Journal (since 1986)
- Member of the Kuwait Journalists Association (1988)
- Member of the Kuwait Organ Transplant Association (1989)
- Member of the Kuwait Lawyers Association (1993)
- Member of the Advisory Board of the Supreme Council of the Gulf Cooperation Council (1997–2005); Vice President in 2002 and President in 2004–2005
- Member of the Board of Trustees of the Volunteer Work Center (2007)
- Member of the Board of Directors of the Kuwait Institute for Judicial and Legal Studies (2007)
- Member of the Board of Directors of Saad Al-Abdullah College for Security Sciences (2007)
- President of the Kuwaiti Lawyers Association (2014–2025)

== Publications and Research Works ==
Al-Yaquob enriched the Arab legal library with several major works that became key references, including:

- Principles of Obligation in Kuwaiti Civil Law (1981; later editions in 2005, 2006, and 2011)
- Release: A Contract or a Unilateral Act of Will? (1983)
- Termination of Indefinite Employment Contracts (1985)
- The Gift Contract in Kuwaiti Civil Law: A Comparative Study (1986)
- Lesion in Civil Law (1987)
- The Legal System of Wages in Kuwaiti Labor Law: A Comparative Study (1988)
- Kuwaiti Civil Law: Its Past and Present (1988)
- Dictionary of Legal Terms (Arabic–English–French) (1996)
- The Lease Contract in Kuwaiti Civil Law (2002)
- Liability for the Use of Dangerous Objects in Kuwaiti Law (2002)

== Personal life ==
Bader Al-Yaquob was married to Hussa Mubarak Abdulaziz Al-Hasawi, and they had five children: Badriya, Farha, Jassim, Mubarak, and Abdulaziz.

== Death ==
Bader Al-Yaquob died on Tuesday, 6 Muharram 1447 AH, corresponding to July 1, 2025, at the age of 79, leaving behind a rich legacy of legal scholarship and public service to his country.
