= Mashari Al-Ballam =

Kuwaiti actor (1971–2021)

- مشاري صالح البلام
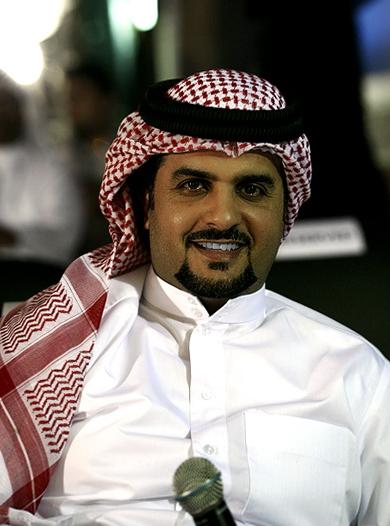
- Mashari Al-Ballam
- Born: December 12, 1971; Failaka Island, Kuwait
- Died: February 25, 2021 (aged 49)

Mashari Saleh Mohsen Al-Ballam (Arabic: مشاري صالح البلام; December 12, 1971 – February 25, 2021), was a Kuwaiti actor. He played many complex roles, such as the epileptic patient in the series Paths of Doubt, and the deaf mute in the series Jarrah Al-Zaman (the wounded time series).

== Education and career ==
He held a diploma in industrial management from the College of Business Studies at the Public Authority for Applied Education and Training. He started his artistic work in 1991 when he participated in the Free Kuwait play, and after that his artistic works were in small and medium roles until he participated in the 1998 series Dart Al-Ayam and was able to achieve success, he later rolled out roles and took on bigger roles.

Al-Ballam participated in the reality TV program Al-Wadi, which was shown on the Lebanese Broadcasting Corporation channel in 2005, and won the title of "Valley Farmer" when he won the audience vote in the final episode on the artist Turki Al-Youssef from Saudi Arabia, the player Khaled Al-Ghandour from Egypt, and his compatriot, Zahra Al-Kharji.

== Personal life ==
He was married and had five children: Saleh, Maryam, Abdullah, Hamad and Sheikha. He was the cousin of actor Hassan Al-Ballam.

== Death ==
Al-Ballam died on February 25, 2021, at the age of 49, a few days after being hospitalized following contracting COVID-19. He had said that he had contracted the virus while receiving the first dose of the vaccine.
