= Ali Al-Mufidi =

Kuwaiti actor and movie director

Ali Al-Mufidi علي المفيدي
- Born: September 10, 1939; Kuwait
- Died: October 28, 2008 (aged 69); Amman Jordan
- Occupation(s): Actor and Director
- Years active: 1957–2008

Ali Al-Mufidi (Arabic: علي المفيدي; September 10, 1939 – October 28, 2008) was a Kuwaiti actor and movie director.

== Works ==
=== Movies ===
- Bas ya Bahr (The Cruel Sea) (1971)

=== Dubbing ===
- Future Boy Conan
- Dinosaur War Izenborg
