= Ali Al-Baghli =

Kuwaiti lawyer and politician (1947–2023)

Minister of Oil
- In office 17 October 1992 – 8 October 1996
- Preceded by: Hammoud Al-Raqaba
- Succeeded by: Issa Al-Mazydi

Member of the National Assembly of Kuwait
- In office 1992–1996

Personal details
- Born: 1 January 1947 Kuwait City, Kuwait
- Died: 26 February 2023 (aged 76) Kuwait City, Kuwait
- Party: Independent
- Education: Kuwait University
- Occupation: Lawyer

Ali Al-Baghli (Arabic: علي البغلي; 1 January 1947 – 26 February 2023) was a Kuwaiti politician. An independent, he served as Minister of Oil from 1992 to 1996.

Al-Baghli died of a heart attack in Kuwait City, on 26 February 2023, at the age of 76.
