= Hussein Al-Qattan =

Kuwaiti actor (1926–2025)

Hussein Al-Qattan (Arabic: حسين القطان; 1926 – 14 June 2025) was a Kuwaiti actor. He is most known for the role of Bu Jassoum in Kuwait Television's first drama series Bu Jassoum's Family. Al-Qattan died on 14 June 2025.
