= Intisar Al-Sharrah =

Kuwaiti actress (1962–2021)

- Born: 5 November 1962; Sha'ab, Hawalli, Kuwait
- Died: 31 July 2021 (aged 58); London, England, UK
- Years active: 1981–2021
- Spouse: Mazen Salem Al-Tamimi
- Children: 3

Intisar Ali Al-Sharrah (Arabic: انتصار الشراح; 5 November 1962 – 31 July 2021) was a Kuwaiti actress. She was one of the few female comedians in Kuwait in the 1980s and 1990s.

== Career ==
Her real debut was through the play "Bye Bye London". She graduated from the Higher Institute of Dramatic Arts in 1985. During her career, she participated in many theater and television works. She was the only actress of her generation to play comedic roles, and she was able to dominate in that period of stardom, to the extent that she formed a duet with the artist Daoud Hussein, and together they presented the most prominent comedic works such as: "With Melodies", "Take and Leave", "Cocktail", "Nest of Marriage", "TV channels" and others.

== Personal life ==
She was married to Mazen Salem Al-Tamimi, and they have three children: Dalal, Salem, and Ali.

== Death ==
She died on Saturday morning, 31 July 2021, after a long illness, in the British capital, London, at the age of 58.
