= Ghanem Al-Saleh =

Voice acter

Ghanem Al-Saleh غانم الصالح
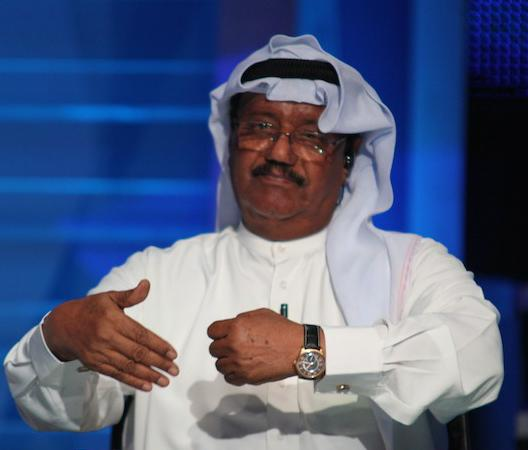
- Born: March 13, 1943; Kuwait, Kuwait
- Died: October 19, 2010 (aged 67); London, England
- Occupation: Actor
- Years active: 1958 – 2010

Ghanem Al-Saleh (March 13, 1943 – October 19, 2010) was a Kuwaiti actor. known for his work in theater, television, and voice acting, remembered for his distinctive performances and contributions to Kuwaiti performing arts.

== Early life and career ==
Ghanem Al-Saleh was born in the Sihid Al-Awazem area near Seif Palace, Kuwait. His father owned a grocery store selling dates and other provisions. He married in 1960 and had five children. In 1961, he co-founded the Arab Theater Group.

He began his career in 1959 at the Ministry of Justice, serving as a session secretary in the Personal Status and Criminal Courts until 1964. He then joined Kuwait Television, where he was appointed assistant head of the Drama Department and later became the head of the department, a position he held until his retirement in 1983.

Al-Saleh was particularly known for his convincing portrayals of villainous characters in television series such as Al-Ghurabaa, Zareer Al-Shar, Al-Dardour, Dunya Al-Qawi, and Umm Al-Banat. These roles made audiences dislike his characters, though his colleagues described him as a gentle, kind-hearted person in real life. He was also noted for his commitment to religious practices, often encouraging his colleagues to observe their prayers.

== Works ==
=== Dubbing ===
- Around the World with Willy Fog
- Bye Bye London
