= Badriya Ahmed =

Emirati producer and media personality

- بدرية أحمد
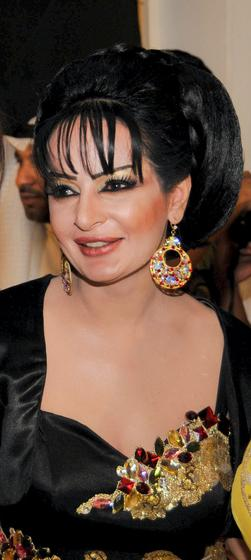
- Badriya Ahmed, 2020
- Born: بدور أحمد تركي (Bodour Ahmed Turki); July 1, 1969 (age 56); Dubai, UAE
- Citizenship: UAE
- Occupation: Actor
- Years active: 1989–present

Badriya Ahmed (Arabic: بدرية أحمد) (b. 1969) is an Emirati Actor. She has appeared in numerous Khaleeji TV series and plays, including Awlad Bu Jassim, The Last Decision, Adil Al-Ruh, Eyes of Glass, and Laila, as well as plays such as Faltouh 1, 1 + 1, Daek fi Zaman Beykh, and Born in a Viagra Pill.

== Biography ==
Badriya Ahmed was born as "Bodour Ahmed Turki" and began her acting career in theatre, making her debut in the 1989 play Faltouh 1. She transitioned to television, where her early role as Shama in the popular 1999 TV drama Al-Mudhi brought her initial public recognition. This role established her as a prominent figure in Emirati television.

In addition to her screen work, she remains an active member of the Dubai National Theatre.

Ahmed married several times and has three sons. She was also engaged to Kuwaiti football player Nawaf Al-Shammari, who played for Qadsia SC. They announced their engagement in late 2007, but separated after 6 months.

On May 15, 2018, Ahmed began wearing the hijab, which she later removed on October 31, 2018, citing personal reasons and requesting privacy regarding her decision. Ahmed has been involved in legal disputes with other artists, including Kuwaiti actress Malak and Syrian actress Marwa Rateb, the latter of whom filed a defamation lawsuit that was subsequently withdrawn.

== Arrest ==
In 2005, Badria Ahmed was arrested in Kuwait on charges of drug possession. She was released on bail of 300 dinars. Ahmed stated that the pills found in her possession were intended for weight loss and that she had been taking them on the advice of friends, claiming she was unaware they contained controlled substances. She was acquitted due to procedural errors in the arrest and search. The case was postponed multiple times, including after she requested the replacement of her lawyer. The Kuwaiti Court of Cassation ultimately refrained from punishing her on charges of using and possessing narcotic pills.

== Health status ==
Badria Ahmed announced that she had been diagnosed with breast cancer, which was detected during a medical procedure. She underwent treatment for seven months and declared her recovery in October 2020. In January 2022, she reported that she was suffering from a bacterial infection in her lungs, which had caused partial lung damage and breathing difficulties.

== Filmography ==
=== TV Series ===
- 1990: Saif Nashwan
- 1993: Night Masts
- 1994: Awlad Bu Jassim
- 1995: The Whales
- 1997: Until Further Notice
- 1997: The Final Decision
- 1999: Dreams of the Simple
- 1999: Al-Mudhi
- 2000: Thank You
- 2000: Below Zero
- 2001: Who Kills Dreams
- 2001: The Taste of Days
- 2001: Life is a Woman
- 2002: Ramadan Smiles
- 2002: The Sighs
- 2002: Lover
- 2002: Behind a Conflict
- 2003: Money and Children
- 2003: A Tear of a Lifetime
- 2003: Oh brother
- 2003: Days of Diaspora
- 2003: The Path of Love
- 2003: Our Big House
- 2003: No to Wounds
- 2004: Al-Zar'our
- 2004: After the Diaspora
- 2004: Like You Know
- 2005: Ah Ya Zaman
- 2005: Adeel Al-Ruh
- 2005: Remnants of the Night
- 2005: Al-Baweya
- 2005: Alienation of Feelings
- 2006: Madness of the Night
- 2006: Abu Shalakh Albarma'ay
- 2006: The Sniper
- 2006: A Smile of Pain
- 2006: Faces of Wax
- 2007: Eyes of Glass
- 2007: Wahid and the Snitches
- 2007: The Impossible Dawn
- 2007: Secrets in Houses
- 2007: Sins Have a Price
- 2008: Hezyan Al-teen
- 2008: Dar Al-Hawa
- 2008: The Dwellers in Our Hearts
- 2008: Layla
- 2009: The Great Love
- 2010: Al-Ghafah
- 2010: Al-Muzawaj
- 2010: Banat Adam
- 2011: Hawamir Al-Sahra
- 2011: Min Oyoni
- 2011: The Maid
- 2011: Ma Netfaaq
- 2012: Kalam Al-Nas
- 2012: Tamasha 4
- 2012: Girls’ Dorm Annex
- 2013: Silk and Fire
- 2013: No for Any Tear of Sadness
- 2013: Silence of Confession
- 2013: Al-Sultana
- 2013: Al-Qayada
- 2014: Obsessions
- 2014: What Brought You Back
- 2015: Fitnat Zamanha
- 2015: Harvest of Time
- 2015: Clusters of Light
- 2016: Betrayal of a Homeland
- 2017: 'Ala Qad Haley
- 2017: Steps of the Devil
- 2017: Tamasha 6
- 2017: Red Card
- 2023: Silk Collar
- 2024: Wadeema and Halima 3
- 2024: In the Circle
- 2024: Memory of a Heart
- 2025: Homeland of My Life

=== Films ===
- 2010: Woman of importance
- 2010: Impossible Motherhood
- 2010: He and I
- 2010: Final Judgment

=== Theater ===
- 1991: Faltou 1
- 2005: 1 + 1
- 2006: Dizzy in a Boring Time
- 2006: Born in a Viagra Pill
- 2008: Shahah and Mazna, Oukhtin and Bakhtin
- 2011: Half-Kam Family (Actress and Producer)
- 2016: Monday Wedding
- 2016: Days of the Pearl
- 2017: Al 'ayal Tafaret
- 2018: Snapiechya
