= 2024 in Kuwait =

- Decades: 2000s; 2010s; 2020s
- See also: Other events of 2024; List of years in Kuwait; Timeline of Kuwaiti history

Events in the year 2024 in Kuwait.

== Incumbents ==
Photo	Post	Name
	Emir of Kuwait	Mishal Al-Ahmad Al-Jaber Al-Sabah
	Prime Minister of Kuwait	Mohammad Sabah Al-Salem Al-Sabah (until 15 April)
	Prime Minister of Kuwait	Ahmad Abdullah al-Ahmad al-Sabah (since 15 April)

== Holidays ==
- 1 January – Monday – New Year's Day
- 8 February – Thursday – The Prophet's Ascension
- 25 February – Sunday – National Day
- 26 February – Monday – Liberation Day
- 9 April – Tuesday – Last Day of Ramadan
- 10–12 April – Eid al-Fitr
- 15 June – Saturday – Arafat Day
- 16–18 June – Eid al-Adha
- 7 July – Sunday – Islamic New Year
- 15 September – Sunday – The Prophet's Birthday

== Events ==
=== January ===
- 4 January – Emir Mishal appoints Sheikh Dr. Mohammad Sabah Al-Salem Al-Sabah as Prime Minister of Kuwait.
- 17 January – The 45th Cabinet of Kuwait is appointed and sworn in by Emir Mishal.

=== February ===
- 15 February – Emir Mishal dissolves the National Assembly.

=== April ===
- 4 April – 2024 Kuwaiti general election. The opposition maintains its majority in the National Assembly.
- 6 April – Prime Minister Mohammad Sabah Al-Salem Al-Sabah submits his cabinet's resignation to Emir Mishal according to Article 57 of the Constitution.
- 7 April – Emir Mishal accepts the government's resignation and instructs it to act as caretaker.
- 15 April – Emir Mishal appoints Sheikh Ahmad Al Abdullah Al Sabah as Prime Minister.
- 22 April - A vacancy is declared in the municipal council covering two seats in the sixth and ninth constituencies respectively, prompting a by-election scheduled on 18 May.

=== May ===
- 4 May – The International Olympic Committee (IOC) bans Kuwait's Sheikh Ahmad Al-Fahad Al-Sabah from all positions within the committee for 15 years over ethics breaches. He was previously banned by the IOC for three years in 2023 over his interference in the Olympic Council of Asia elections, and a criminal conviction in Switzerland related to forgery and the orchestration of a counterfeit arbitration process.
- 10 May – Emir Mishal dissolves the National Assembly again and suspends some articles of the Constitution.
- 12 May – Emir Mishal signs a decree to form the 46th Cabinet of Kuwait.
- 15 May –
  - Emir Mishal signs a decree to address Prime Minister Sheikh Ahmad Al Abdullah Al Sabah as His Highness, previously reserved for the Emir and Crown Prince.
  - The 46th Cabinet of Kuwait swears the constitutional oath before Emir Mishal.
- 18 May – Municipal Council By-Elections for the sixth and ninth constituencies are held. Waleed Al-Dagher and Fahad Al-Ajmi win the respective seats.
- 28 May –
  - Issam Salem Al-Roumi is appointed as the Head of the State Audit Bureau.
  - The Cabinet approves a draft decree forming the Central Agency for Public Tenders Board of Directors.

=== June ===
- 1 June – Sheikh Sabah Al-Khalid Al-Sabah is nominated as Crown Prince.
- 12 June – 2024 Mangaf building fire: A fire at a residential building housing foreign workers in Mangaf kills 49 people and injures 43.
- 20 June – Temporary power cuts are imposed in some parts of the country during peak consumption hours due to increased demand spurred by extreme summer heat.

=== July ===
- 14 July – The Kuwait Petroleum Corporation announces the discovery of an oil deposit in the al-Nokhatha field east of Failaka Island, with an area of around 96 square kilometers and reserves estimated to contain 3.2 billion barrels of oil.

=== August ===
- 18 August – Rolling blackouts are implemented in parts of the country due to a "fuel supply disruption".
- 25 August - Emir Mishal signs a decree reshuffling the cabinet, adding four new ministers and issuing a change in portfolios.

=== September ===
- 8 September - Finance Minister Nora al-Fassam is appointed as acting oil minister.

== Deaths ==
- 1 January – Naji Al-Zaid (aged 75), medical doctor and writer
- 6 March – Mohammed Al-Sharekh (aged 81 or 82), entrepreneur and author.
- 7 July – Sheikh Ali Abdullah Al-Salem Al-Mubarak Al-Sabah, former governor and youngest son of Kuwait's 11th Emir Sheikh Abdullah Al-Salim Al-Sabah (aged 78).
- 12 August – Sheikh Salem_Al-Ali_Al-Sabah, chief of the Kuwait National Guard (KNG) (aged 98).
- 14 September – Jaber Al-Mubarak Al-Hamad Al-Sabah, prime minister (2011–2019) and minister of defense (2001–2011) (aged 82).
- 21 October – Abdullah Al-Taweel, Kuwaiti politician, minister of health (2007–2008).
