= COVID-19 pandemic in Kuwait =

- Disease: COVID-19
- Pathogen: SARS-CoV-2
- Location: Kuwait
- First outbreak: Wuhan, Hubei, China
- Index case: Kuwait City
- Arrival date: 24 February 2020
- Confirmed cases: 667,290
- Deaths: 2,570
- Fatality rate: 0.39%
- Vaccinations: 3,457,498 (total vaccinated); 3,346,176 (fully vaccinated); 8,261,221 (doses administered)

Government website
- corona.e.gov.kw

The COVID-19 pandemic in Kuwait was a part of the worldwide pandemic of coronavirus 2019 (COVID-19) caused by severe acute respiratory syndrome coronavirus 2 (SARS-CoV-2). The first confirmed case in Kuwait was announced on 24 February 2020.

== Background ==
On 12 January 2020, the World Health Organization (WHO) confirmed that a novel coronavirus was the cause of a respiratory illness in a cluster of people in Wuhan City, Hubei Province, China, which was reported to the WHO on 31 December 2019.

The case fatality ratio for COVID-19 has been much lower than SARS of 2003, but the transmission has been significantly greater, with a significant total death toll.

== Timeline ==
Cases

Deaths

=== February 2020 ===
On 24 February, Kuwaiti Ministry of Health announced that there were 3 cases detected coming from Iran that carry coronavirus disease 2019. The first person was a Kuwait I national, 53 years old, while the second was a Saudi national, 61 years old, and the third was a person from the stateless community. Later, 2 cases were announced on that same day. At the end of 24 February, there were 5 confirmed cases in Kuwait.

On 25 February, Kuwaiti Ministry of Health announced that there were 4 new cases coming from Iran with coronavirus disease 2019. At the end of 25 February, there were 9 confirmed cases in Kuwait.

On 26 February, Kuwaiti Ministry of Health announced that 16 news cases have been reported with the novel coronavirus, associated with travel to Iran. At the end of 26 February, there were 25 confirmed cases in Kuwait.

On 27 February, Kuwaiti Ministry of Health announced new 18 cases associated with travel to Iran. At the end of 27 February, there were 43 confirmed cases in Kuwait.

On 28 February, Kuwaiti Ministry of Health announced new 2 cases associated with travel to Iran. At the end of 28 February, there were 45 confirmed cases in Kuwait.

On 29 February, the Kuwaiti Ministry of Health announced that there were no new cases. At the end of February, there were 45 confirmed cases in Kuwait.

=== March 2020 ===
On 11 March, Kuwaiti Directorate General of Civil Aviation has suspended all travel, except cargo flights, to and from Kuwait starting from 13 March, effectively locking down the nation until further notice.

On 12 March, Kuwaiti Ministry of Health announced 8 new cases, bringing the total number of confirmed cases to 80.

On 13 March, the Kuwaiti Ministry of Health announced 20 new cases, bringing the total number of confirmed cases to 100. The Public Authority Of Agriculture Affairs And Fish Resources closed public parks, and the ministry of Awqaf and Islamic Affairs announced just before noon prayers for Muslims to pray from home and not to attend Friday prayers during a pandemic.

COVID-19 cases and deaths in Kuwait
Date	Confirmed cases			Recoveries		ICU (Note: A dash (-) does not indicate a zero (0); it means that no data is available)	NP Swab Test		Deaths	
Date	New	Total	Active (Note: Active case number is calculated by subtracting the deaths and recoveries from the total case number)	New	Total	New	New	Total	New	Total
2020-02-24	5	5	5	0	0	-	-	-	0	0
2020-02-25	3	8	8	0	0	-	-	-	0	0
2020-02-26	17	26	26	0	0	-	-	-	0	0
2020-02-27	17	43	43	0	0	-	-	-	0	0
2020-02-28	2	45	45	0	0	-	-	-	0	0
2020-02-29	0	45	45	0	0	-	-	-	0	0
Date	Confirmed cases			Recoveries		ICU	NP Swab Test		Deaths	
Date	New	Total	Active	New	Total	New	New	Total	New	Total
2020-03-01	1	46	46	0	0	-	-	-	0	0
2020-03-02	10	56	56	0	0	-	-	-	0	0
2020-03-03	0	56	56	0	0	-	-	-	0	0
2020-03-04	0	56	56	0	0	-	-	-	0	0
2020-03-05	2	58	58	0	0	-	-	-	0	0
2020-03-06	0	58	58	0	0	-	-	-	0	0
2020-03-07	3	61	61	0	0	-	-	-	0	0
2020-03-08	3	64	64	0	0	-	-	-	0	0
2020-03-09	1	65	65	0	0	-	-	-	0	0
2020-03-10	4	69	69	0	0	-	-	-	0	0
2020-03-11	3	72	70	2	2	5	-	-	0	0
2020-03-12	8	80	75	3	5	4	-	-	0	0
2020-03-13	20	100	95	0	5	4	-	-	0	0
2020-03-14	4	104	97	2	7	6	-	-	0	0
2020-03-15	8	112	103	2	9	4	-	-	0	0
2020-03-16	11	123	114	0	9	4	-	-	0	0
2020-03-17	7	130	118	3	12	4	-	-	0	0
2020-03-18	12	142	127	3	15	4	-	-	0	0
2020-03-19	6	148	130	3	18	5	-	-	0	0
2020-03-20	11	159	137	4	22	5	-	-	0	0
2020-03-21	17	176	149	5	27	5	-	-	0	0
2020-03-22	12	188	158	3	30	5	-	-	0	0
2020-03-23	1	189	159	0	30	5	-	-	0	0
2020-03-24	2	191	152	9	39	5	-	-	0	0
2020-03-25	4	195	152	4	43	6	-	-	0	0
2020-03-26	13	208	159	6	49	7	-	-	0	0
2020-03-27	17	225	168	8	57	11	-	-	0	0
2020-03-28	10	235	171	7	64	11	-	-	0	0
2020-03-29	20	255	188	3	67	12	-	-	0	0
2020-03-30	11	266	194	5	72	13	-	-	0	0
2020-03-31	23	289	216	1	73	13	-	-	0	0
Date	Confirmed cases			Recoveries		ICU	NP Swab Test		Deaths	
Date	New	Total	Active	New	Total	New	New	Total	New	Total
2020-04-01	28	317	237	7	80	14	-	-	0	0
2020-04-02	25	342	261	1	81	15	-	-	0	0
2020-04-03	75	411	335	1	82	16	-	-	0	0
2020-04-04	62	479	385	11	93	17	-	-	1	1
2020-04-05	77	556	456	6	99	17	-	-	0	1
2020-04-06	109	665	561	4	103	20	-	-	0	1
2020-04-07	78	743	637	2	105	23	-	-	0	1
2020-04-08	112	855	743	6	111	21	-	-	0	1
2020-04-09	55	910	798	0	111	22	-	-	0	1
2020-04-10	83	993	869	12	123	26	-	-	0	1
2020-04-11	161	1,154	1,020	10	113	27	-	-	0	1
2020-04-12	80	1,234	1,091	9	142	29	-	-	0	1
2020-04-13	66	1,300	1,148	8	150	26	-	-	1	2
2020-04-14	55	1,355	1,176	26	176	26	-	-	1	3
2020-04-15	50	1,405	1,196	30	206	31	-	-	0	3
2020-04-16	119	1,524	1,296	19	225	32	-	-	0	3
2020-04-17	134	1,658	1,395	33	258	32	-	-	2	5
2020-04-18	93	1,751	1,465	22	280	34	-	-	1	6
2020-04-19	164	1,915	1,603	25	305	38	-	-	1	7
2020-04-20	80	1,995	1,619	62	367	39	-	-	2	9
2020-04-21	85	2,080	1,657	45	412	46	-	-	2	11
2020-04-22	168	2,248	1,792	31	443	50	-	-	2	13
2020-04-23	151	2,399	1,887	55	498	55	-	-	1	14
2020-04-24	215	2,614	1,986	115	613	60	-	-	1	15
2020-04-25	278	2,892	2,217	43	656	58	-	-	4	19
2020-04-26	183	3,075	2,249	150	806	61	-	-	1	20
2020-04-27	213	3,288	2,254	206	1,012	64	-	-	2	22
2020-04-28	152	3,440	2,241	164	1,176	67	-	-	1	23
2020-04-29	300	3,740	2,327	213	1,389	66	-	-	1	24
2020-04-30	284	4,024	2,459	150	1,539	66	-	-	2	26
Date	Confirmed cases			Recoveries		ICU	NP Swab Test		Deaths	
Date	New	Total	Active	New	Total	New	New	Total	New	Total
2020-05-01	353	4,377	2,745	63	1,602	70	-	-	4	30
2020-05-02	242	4,619	2,883	101	1,703	69	-	-	3	33
2020-05-03	364	4,983	3,169	73	1,776	72	-	-	5	38
2020-05-04	295	5,278	3,291	171	1,947	79	-	-	2	40
2020-05-05	526	5,804	3,732	85	2,032	90	-	-	0	40
2020-05-06	485	6,289	4,028	187	2,219	88	-	-	2	42
2020-05-07	278	6,567	4,142	162	2,381	91	-	-	2	44
2020-05-08	641	7,208	4,695	85	2,466	91	-	-	4	30
2020-05-09	415	7,623	4,952	156	2,622	95	-	-	2	49
2020-05-10	1,065	8,688	5,901	107	2,729	114	-	-	9	58
2020-05-11	598	9,286	6,314	178	2,907	131	-	-	7	65
2020-05-12	991	10,277	7,101	194	3,101	158	-	-	10	75
2020-05-13	751	11,028	7,683	162	3,263	169	4,257	227,000	7	82
2020-05-14	947	11,975	8,436	188	3,451	175	4,930	231,930	6	88
2020-05-15	885	12,860	9,124	189	3,640	190	4,074	236,004	8	96
2020-05-16	942	13,802	9,852	203	3,843	169	4,712	240,716	11	107
2020-05-17	1,048	14,850	10,645	250	4,093	168	3,760	244,476	5	112
2020-05-18	841	15,691	11,234	246	4,339	161	3,838	248,314	6	118
2020-05-19	1,073	16,764	11,962	342	4,681	179	4,382	252,696	3	121
2020-05-20	804	17,568	12,559	204	4,885	167	3,618	256,314	3	124
2020-05-21	1,041	18,609	13,275	320	5,205	181	4,757	261,071	5	129
2020-05-22	955	19,564	13,911	310	5,515	180	3,888	264,959	9	138
2020-05-23	900	20,464	14,569	232	5,747	192	3,195	268,154	10	148
2020-05-24	838	21,302	15,029	370	6,117	177	2,935	271,089	8	156
2020-05-25	665	21,967	15,181	504	6,621	182	2,723	273,812	9	165
2020-05-26	608	22,575	15,097	685	7,306	196	2,395	276,207	7	172
2020-05-27	692	23,267	15,146	640	7,946	193	2,738	278,945	3	175
2020-05-28	845	24,112	15,229	752	8,698	197	3,396	282,341	10	185
2020-05-29	1,072	25,184	15,717	575	9,273	191	4,011	286,352	9	194
2020-05-30	1,008	26,192	15,831	883	10,156	206	3,661	290,013	11	205
2020-05-31	851	27,043	15,445	1,230	11,386	200	3,349	293,362	7	212
Date	Confirmed cases			Recoveries		ICU	NP Swab Test		Deaths	
Date	New	Total	Active	New	Total	New	New	Total	New	Total
2020-06-01	719	27,762	14,643	1,513	12,899	204	3,664	297,026	8	220
2020-06-02	887	28,649	14,142	1,382	14,281	187	3,325	300,351	6	226
2020-06-03	710	29,359	13,379	1,469	14,281	191	2,934	303,285	4	230
2020-06-04	562	29,921	12,462	1,473	17,223	184	2,721	306,006	6	236
2020-06-05	723	30,644	12,123	1,054	18,277	197	2,894	308,900	8	244
2020-06-06	487	31,131	11,595	1,005	19,282	180	2,724	311,624	10	254
2020-06-07	717	31,848	11,379	923	20,205	196	3,661	315,285	10	264
2020-06-08	662	32,510	10,999	1,037	21,242	166	2,999	318,284	5	269
2020-06-09	630	33,140	10,705	920	22,162	173	3,218	321,502	4	273
2020-06-10	683	33,823	10,260	1,126	23,288	193	2,871	324,373	2	275
2020-06-11	609	34,432	10,016	849	24,137	184	2,771	327,144	4	279
2020-06-12	520	34,952	9,619	911	25,048	172	2,985	330,129	6	285
2020-06-13	514	35,466	9,295	834	25,882	176	2,159	332,288	4	289
2020-06-14	454	35,920	8,865	877	26,759	171	2,324	334,612	7	296
2020-06-15	511	36,431	8,602	772	27,531	184	2,775	337,387	2	298
2020-06-16	527	36,958	8,449	675	28,206	194	2,755	340,142	5	303
2020-06-17	575	37,533	8,331	690	28,896	190	2,885	343,027	3	306
2020-06-18	541	38,074	8,254	616	29,512	188	3,298	346,325	2	308
2020-06-19	604	38,678	8,175	678	30,190	193	3,087	349,412	5	313
2020-06-20	467	39,145	8,100	536	30,726	180	2,224	351,636	6	319
2020-06-21	505	39,650	8,084	514	31,240	186	2,742	354,378	7	326
2020-06-22	641	40,291	8,191	530	31,770	181	3,216	357,594	4	330
2020-06-23	742	41,033	8,395	534	32,304	165	3,645	361,239	4	334
2020-06-24	846	41,879	8,733	505	32,809	153	3,985	365,224	3	337
2020-06-25	909	42,778	9,082	558	33,367	152	3,286	368,510	2	339
2020-06-26	915	43,703	9,393	602	33,969	162	3,774	372,284	2	341
2020-06-27	688	44,391	9,461	617	34,586	155	3,240	375,524	3	344
2020-06-28	551	44,942	9,100	908	35,494	149	3,814	379,338	4	348
2020-06-29	582	45,524	8,861	819	36,313	145	3,504	382,842	2	350
2020-06-30	671	46,195	8,811	717	37,030	139	4,045	386,887	4	354
Date	Confirmed cases			Recoveries		ICU	NP Swab Test		Deaths	
Date	New	Total	Active	New	Total	New	New	Total	New	Total
2020-07-01	745	46,940	8,867	685	37,715	139	4,150	391,037	4	358
2020-07-02	919	47,859	9,110	675	38,390	142	4,312	395,349	1	359
2020-07-03	813	48,672	9,036	886	39,276	144	4,149	399,498	1	360
2020-07-04	631	49,303	8,995	667	39,943	158	3,443	402,941	5	365
2020-07-05	638	49,941	9,110	520	40,463	157	3,043	405,984	3	368
2020-07-06	703	50,644	9,270	538	41,001	152	3,351	409,335	5	373
2020-07-07	601	51,245	9,353	514	41,515	159	4,195	413,530	4	377
2020-07-08	762	52,007	9,520	593	42,108	161	4,344	417,874	2	379
2020-07-09	833	52,840	9,772	578	42,686	150	5,011	422,885	3	382
2020-07-10	740	53,580	9,983	528	43,214	157	4,121	427,006	1	383
2020-07-11	478	54,058	9,711	747	43,961	150	2,495	429,501	3	386
2020-07-12	836	54,894	9,894	649	44,610	151	3,835	433,336	4	390
2020-07-13	614	55,508	9,759	746	45,356	148	4,086	437,422	3	393
2020-07-14	666	56,174	9,617	805	46,161	156	3,721	441,143	3	396
2020-07-15	703	56,877	9,581	736	46,897	146	4,041	445,184	3	399
2020-07-16	791	57,668	9,721	648	47,545	142	4,341	449,525	3	402
2020-07-17	553	58,221	9,436	836	48,381	143	3,443	452,970	2	404
2020-07-18	683	58,904	9,477	639	49,020	137	4,370	457,340	3	407
2020-07-19	300	59,204	9,109	667	49,687	132	2,009	459,349	1	408
2020-07-20	559	59,763	9,016	652	50,339	138	3,355	462,704	0	408
2020-07-21	671	60,434	9,103	580	50,919	127	4,157	466,861	4	412
2020-07-22	751	61,185	9,248	601	51,520	127	4,139	471,000	5	417
2020-07-23	687	61,872	9,204	727	52,247	124	3,808	474,808	4	421
2020-07-24	753	62,625	9,285	668	52,915	129	4,603	479,411	4	425
2020-07-25	684	63,309	9,273	692	53,607	123	3,909	483,320	4	429
2020-07-26	464	63,773	8,967	766	54,373	123	2,418	485,738	4	433
2020-07-27	606	64,379	8,884	684	55,057	121	3,828	489,566	5	438
2020-07-28	770	65,149	9,026	624	55,681	124	4,732	494,298	4	442
2020-07-29	754	65,903	8,992	786	56,467	125	4,059	498,357	2	444
2020-07-30	626	66,529	8,754	863	57,330	134	3,811	502,168	1	445
2020-07-31	428	66,957	8,578	602	57,932	134	2,920	505,088	2	447
Date	Confirmed cases			Recoveries		ICU	NP Swab Test		Deaths	
Date	New	Total	Active	New	Total	New	New	Total	New	Total
2020-08-01	491	67,448	8,470	593	58,525	134	2,432	507,520	6	453
2020-08-02	463	67,911	8,241	688	59,213	129	2,041	509,561	4	457
2020-08-03	388	68,299	8,099	526	59,739	126	2,038	511,599	4	461
2020-08-04	475	68,774	7,983	587	60,326	131	2,452	514,051	4	465
2020-08-05	651	69,425	8,051	580	60,906	128	4,550	518,601	3	468
2020-08-06	620	70,045	7,966	704	61,610	127	3,599	522,200	1	469
2020-08-07	682	70,727	7,926	720	62,330	124	4,086	526,286	2	471
2020-08-08	472	71,199	7,919	476	62,806	125	2,844	529,130	3	474
2020-08-09	514	71,713	7,716	713	63,519	115	3,223	532,353	4	478
2020-08-10	687	72,400	7,890	509	64,028	117	3,450	535,803	4	482
2020-08-11	668	73,068	7,823	731	64,759	110	3,658	539,461	4	486
2020-08-12	717	73,785	7,845	692	65,451	117	4,397	543,858	3	489
2020-08-13	701	74,486	7,898	648	66,099	118	4,147	548,005	0	489
2020-08-14	699	75,185	7,951	641	66,740	115	4,576	552,581	5	494
2020-08-15	512	75,697	7,680	779	67,519	115	3,356	555,937	4	498
2020-08-16	508	76,205	7,569	616	68,135	117	2,863	558,800	3	501
2020-08-17	622	76,827	7,692	498	68,633	109	4,334	563,134	1	502
2020-08-18	643	77,470	7,722	610	69,243	101	5,306	568,440	3	505
2020-08-19	675	78,145	7,867	528	69,771	96	4,811	573,251	2	507
2020-08-20	622	78,767	7,616	871	70,642	94	4,337	577,588	2	509
2020-08-21	502	79,269	7,494	622	71,264	95	3,530	581,118	2	511
2020-08-22	688	79,957	7,674	506	71,770	97	4,006	585,124	2	513
2020-08-23	571	80,528	7,706	537	72,307	97	2,443	587,567	2	515
2020-08-24	432	80,960	7,517	618	72,925	99	3,056	590,623	3	518
2020-08-25	613	81,573	7,652	477	73,402	95	4,426	595,049	1	519
2020-08-26	698	82,271	7,844	504	73,906	92	4,364	599,413	2	521
2020-08-27	674	82,945	7,901	616	74,522	97	4,191	603,604	1	522
2020-08-28	633	83,578	7,733	798	75,320	94	4,317	607,921	3	525
2020-08-29	646	84,224	7,703	673	75,993	92	3,718	611,639	3	528
2020-08-30	412	84,636	7,456	657	76,650	89	2,490	614,129	2	530
2020-08-31	473	85,109	7,354	574	77,224	91	3,490	617,619	1	531
Date	Confirmed cases			Recoveries		ICU	NP Swab Test		Deaths	
Date	New	Total	Active	New	Total	New	New	Total	New	Total
2020-09-01	702	85,811	7,620	433	77,657	90	3,997	621,616	3	534
2020-09-02	667	86,478	7,734	552	78,209	92	4,425	626,041	1	535
2020-09-03	900	87,378	8,051	582	78,791	93	5,441	631,482	1	536
2020-09-04	865	88,243	8,289	626	79,417	94	4,738	636,220	1	537
2020-09-05	720	88,963	8,520	486	79,903	91	4,414	640,634	3	540
2020-09-06	619	89,582	8,517	618	80,521	94	3,093	643,727	4	544
2020-09-07	805	90,387	8,804	516	81,037	90	4,324	648,051	2	546
2020-09-08	857	91,244	9,042	617	81,654	89	5,048	653,099	2	548
2020-09-09	838	92,082	9,308	568	82,222	89	4,652	657,751	4	552
2020-09-10	740	92,822	9,226	818	83,040	90	5,384	663,135	4	556
2020-09-11	653	93,475	9,258	620	83,660	97	4,870	668,005	1	557
2020-09-12	736	94,211	9,249	744	84,404	94	4,998	673,003	1	558
2020-09-13	553	94,764	9,209	591	84,995	94	2,739	675,742	2	560
2020-09-14	708	95,472	9,408	506	85,501	86	3,928	679,670	3	563
2020-09-15	829	96,301	9,514	718	86,219	84	4,534	684,204	5	568
2020-09-16	698	96,999	9,241	968	87,187	93	5,384	689,588	3	571
2020-09-17	825	97,824	9,338	724	87,911	94	5,968	695,556	4	575
2020-09-18	704	98,528	9,172	865	88,776	101	5,928	701,484	5	580
2020-09-19	521	99,049	8,970	722	89,498	96	3,545	705,029	1	581
2020-09-20	385	99,434	8,682	670	90,168	98	2,263	707,292	3	584
2020-09-21	530	99,964	8,449	762	90,930	93	3,944	711,236	1	585
2020-09-22	719	100,683	8,483	682	91,612	99	4,651	715,887	3	588
2020-09-23	616	101,299	8,368	729	92,341	101	4,622	720,509	2	590
2020-09-24	552	101,851	8,298	620	92,961	101	4,516	725,025	2	592
2020-09-25	590	102,441	8,284	601	93,562	111	4,730	729,755	3	595
2020-09-26	758	103,199	8,391	649	94,211	108	4,138	733,893	2	597
2020-09-27	345	103,544	8,014	718	94,929	109	2,025	735,918	4	601
2020-09-28	437	103,981	7,865	582	95,511	125	2,865	738,783	4	605
2020-09-29	587	104,568	7,912	538	96,049	127	4,014	742,797	2	607
2020-09-30	614	105,182	7,884	639	96,688	133	4,436	747,233	3	610
Date	Confirmed cases			Recoveries		ICU	NP Swab Test		Deaths	
Date	New	Total	Active	New	Total	New	New	Total	New	Total
2020-10-01	494	105,676	7,867	509	97,197	139	3,930	751,163	2	612
2020-10-02	411	106,087	7,574	701	97,898	137	2,612	753,775	3	615
2020-10-03	371	106,458	7,403	537	98,435	129	1,990	755,765	5	620
2020-10-04	567	107,025	7,361	605	99,040	142	2,050	757,815	4	624
2020-10-05	567	107,592	7,415	509	99,549	129	3,210	761,025	4	628
2020-10-06	676	108,268	7,457	630	100,179	139	3,583	764,608	4	632
2020-10-07	475	108,743	7,328	597	100,776	127	4,083	768,691	7	639
2020-10-08	698	109,441	7,485	538	101,314	129	4,120	772,811	3	642
2020-10-09	635	110,076	7,403	710	102,024	125	3,922	776,733	7	649
2020-10-10	492	110,568	7,191	698	102,722	139	2,805	779,538	6	655
2020-10-11	548	111,116	7,190	546	103,268	140	2,717	782,255	3	658
2020-10-12	777	111,893	7,427	534	103,802	139	6,450	788,705	6	664
2020-10-13	844	112,737	7,557	706	104,508	143	8,055	796,760	8	672
2020-10-14	532	113,269	7,357	728	105,236	139	4,177	800,937	4	676
2020-10-15	746	114,015	7,485	610	105,846	133	8,554	809,491	8	684
2020-10-16	729	114,744	7,559	649	106,495	136	8,014	817,505	6	690
2020-10-17	739	115,483	7,681	613	107,108	139	5,701	823,206	4	694
2020-10-18	663	116,146	7,585	752	107,860	138	4,959	828,165	7	701
2020-10-19	686	116,832	7,516	746	108,606	133	6,002	834,167	9	710
2020-10-20	886	117,718	7,806	592	109,198	133	7,935	842,102	4	714
2020-10-21	813	118,531	7,560	718	109,916	130	7,560	849,662	7	721
2020-10-22	889	119,420	7,976	798	110,714	126	7,976	857,707	9	730
2020-10-23	812	120,232	8,052	726	111,440	122	7,853	865,560	10	740
2020-10-24	695	120,927	8,073	670	112,110	123	5,194	870,754	4	744
2020-10-25	708	121,635	8,118	661	112,771	121	5,496	876,250	2	746
2020-10-26	682	122,317	8,177	620	113,391	122	5,431	881,681	3	749
2020-10-27	775	123,092	8,220	725	114,116	116	7,874	889,555	7	756
2020-10-28	814	123,906	8,220	807	114,923	107	7,431	896,986	7	763
2020-10-29	760	124,666	8,424	552	115,475	104	8,147	905,133	4	767
2020-10-30	671	125,337	8,362	727	116,202	108	6,221	911,354	6	773
2020-10-31	589	125,926	8,285	660	116,862	110	5,171	916,525	6	779
Date	Confirmed cases			Recoveries		ICU	NP Swab Test		Deaths	
Date	New	Total	Active	New	Total	New	New	Total	New	Total
2020-11-01	608	126,534	8,194	696	117,558	109	4,753	921,278	3	782
2020-11-02	759	127,293	8,121	828	118,386	114	5,611	926,889	4	786
2020-11-03	787	128,080	8,211	694	119,080	110	6,737	933,626	3	789
2020-11-04	763	128,843	8,307	662	119,742	114	6,892	940,518	5	794
2020-11-05	795	129,638	8,275	822	120,564	115	7,403	947,921	5	799
2020-11-06	825	130,463	8,396	699	121,263	115	7,526	955,447	5	804
2020-11-07	742	131,205	8,508	626	121,889	114	5,278	960,725	4	808
2020-11-08	538	131,743	8,356	687	122,576	121	5,105	965,830	3	811
2020-11-09	735	132,478	8,348	738	123,314	120	5,659	971,489	5	816
2020-11-10	903	133,381	8,404	842	124,156	115	7,847	979,336	5	821
2020-11-11	778	134,159	8,428	749	124,905	108	6,808	986,144	5	826
2020-11-12	773	134,932	8,509	688	125,593	110	7,272	993,416	4	830
2020-11-13	718	135,650	8,473	751	126,344	110	7,834	1,001,250	3	833
2020-11-14	691	136,341	8,604	558	126,902	111	5,462	1,006,712	2	835
2020-11-15	499	136,840	8,417	683	127,585	109	4,854	1,011,566	3	838
2020-11-16	489	137,329	8,073	829	128,414	115	5,072	1,016,638	4	842
2020-11-17	556	137,885	7,996	627	129,041	105	6,521	1,023,159	6	848
2020-11-18	452	138,337	7,641	798	129,839	105	6,068	1,029,227	9	857
2020-11-19	485	138,822	7,537	587	130,426	94	6,758	1,035,985	2	859
2020-11-20	486	139,308	7,398	623	131,049	92	6,250	1,042,235	2	861
2020-11-21	426	139,734	7,311	511	131,560	84	5,667	1,047,902	2	863
2020-11-22	322	140,056	7,012	618	132,178	86	4,099	1,052,001	3	866
2020-11-23	337	140,393	6,677	670	132,848	80	4,492	1,056,493	2	868
2020-11-24	402	140,795	6,518	559	133,407	75	5,583	1,062,076	2	870
2020-11-25	422	141,217	6,313	626	134,033	78	6,117	1,068,193	1	871
2020-11-26	330	141,547	5,925	717	134,750	80	7,458	1,075,651	1	872
2020-11-27	329	141,876	5,699	553	135,303	81	6,776	1,082,427	2	874
2020-11-28	319	142,195	5,431	586	135,889	77	4,242	1,086,669	1	875
2020-11-29	231	142,426	5,135	524	136,413	76	4,827	1,091,496	3	878
2020-11-30	209	142,635	4,684	658	137,071	84	4,078	1,095,574	2	880
Date	Confirmed cases			Recoveries		ICU	NP Swab Test		Deaths	
Date	New	Total	Active	New	Total	New	New	Total	New	Total
2020-12-01	357	142,992	4,486	554	137,625	82	5,572	1,101,146	1	881
2020-12-02	268	143,260	4,244	509	138,134	79	6,435	1,107,581	1	882
2020-12-03	314	143,574	4,016	540	138,674	84	11,039	1,118,620	2	884
2020-12-04	343	143,917	3,883	474	139,148	84	12,124	1,130,744	2	886
2020-12-05	247	144,164	3,665	462	139,610	83	6,948	1,137,692	3	889
2020-12-06	205	144,369	3,443	425	140,035	81	4,102	1,141,794	2	891
2020-12-07	230	144,599	3,361	306	140,341	84	4,626	1,146,420	6	897
2020-12-08	301	144,900	3,362	297	140,638	72	5,783	1,152,203	3	900
2020-12-09	304	145,204	3,310	351	140,989	79	6,656	1,158,859	5	905
2020-12-10	291	145,495	3,326	270	141,259	72	6,575	1,165,434	5	910
2020-12-11	294	145,789	3,310	310	141,569	66	6,725	1,172,159	0	910
2020-12-12	255	146,044	3,308	256	141,825	68	4,824	1,176,983	1	911
2020-12-13	174	146,218	3,213	269	142,094	62	3,679	1,180,662	0	911
2020-12-14	231	146,449	3,180	263	142,357	57	4,963	1,185,625	1	912
2020-12-15	261	146,710	3,198	242	142,599	56	4,662	1,190,287	1	913
2020-12-16	261	146,971	3,149	310	142,909	54	6,633	1,196,920	0	913
2020-12-17	221	147,192	3,166	204	143,113	54	5,804	1,202,724	0	913
2020-12-18	339	147,531	3,260	242	143,355	51	6,667	1,209,391	3	916
2020-12-19	244	147,775	3,216	286	143,641	57	4,756	1,214,147	2	918
2020-12-20	204	147,979	3,132	285	143,926	60	4,242	1,218,389	3	921
2020-12-21	230	148,209	3,145	216	144,142	55	4,788	1,223,177	1	922
2020-12-22	298	148,507	3,228	214	144,356	53	5,641	1,228,818	1	923
2020-12-23	266	148,773	3,255	238	144,594	54	3,459	1,232,277	1	924
2020-12-24	244	149,017	3,193	304	144,898	49	3,565	1,235,842	2	926
2020-12-25	260	149,277	3,221	232	145,130	39	3,290	1,239,132	0	926
2020-12-26	172	149,449	3,140	250	145,380	36	2,132	1,241,264	3	929
2020-12-27	204	149,653	3,143	199	145,579	36	2,158	1,243,422	2	931
2020-12-28	204	149,857	3,117	229	145,808	42	2,106	1,245,528	1	932
2020-12-29	236	150,093	3,105	248	146,056	43	3,586	1,249,114	0	932
2020-12-30	205	150,298	3,081	228	146,284	46	2,429	1,251,543	1	933
2020-12-31	286	150,584	3,133	233	146,517	47	3,289	1,254,832	1	934
Date	Confirmed cases			Recoveries		ICU	NP Swab Test		Deaths	
Date	New	Total	Active	New	Total	New	New	Total	New	Total
2021-01-01	285	150,869	3,156	260	146,777	46	4,161	1,258,993	2	936
2021-01-02	205	151,074	3,147	213	146,990	47	3,245	1,262,238	1	937
2021-01-03	269	151,343	3,135	281	147,271	53	4,712	1,266,950	0	937
2021-01-04	372	151,715	3,266	240	147,511	51	5,067	1,272,017	1	938
2021-01-05	312	152,027	3,305	273	147,784	55	5,180	1,277,197	0	938
2021-01-06	411	152,438	3,485	231	148,015	56	10,558	1,287,755	0	938
2021-01-07	540	152,978	3,801	224	148,239	55	12,279	1,300,034	0	938
2021-01-08	495	153,473	4,050	244	148,483	54	11,597	1,311,631	2	940
2021-01-09	427	153,900	4,230	245	148,728	51	8,015	1,319,646	2	942
2021-01-10	414	154,314	4,364	279	149,007	46	7,781	1,327,427	1	943
2021-01-11	527	154,841	4,523	366	149,373	50	10,087	1,337,514	2	945
2021-01-12	494	155,335	4,814	202	149,575	47	10,340	1,347,854	1	946
2021-01-13	539	155,874	5,119	234	149,809	48	11,567	1,359,421	0	946
2021-01-14	560	156,434	5,427	252	150,061	49	10,360	1,369,781	0	946
2021-01-15	530	156,964	5,688	268	150,329	48	10,862	1,380,643	1	947
2021-01-16	435	157,399	5,774	349	150,678	48	8,651	1,389,294	0	947
2021-01-17	378	157,777	5,688	464	151,142	54	8,251	1,397,545	0	947
2021-01-18	467	158,244	5,800	354	151,496	56	8,807	1,406,352	1	948
2021-01-19	578	158,822	5,936	440	151,936	53	8,845	1,415,197	2	950
2021-01-20	442	159,264	5,893	484	152,420	54	10,283	1,425,480	1	951
2021-01-21	570	159,834	6,057	406	152,826	51	10,712	1,436,192	0	951
2021-01-22	533	160,367	6,108	481	153,307	48	10,311	1,446,503	1	952
2021-01-23	534	160,901	6,203	439	153,746	50	8,978	1,455,481	0	952
2021-01-24	384	161,285	6,080	507	154,253	48	7,695	1,463,176	0	952
2021-01-25	492	161,777	6,057	513	154,766	51	7,928	1,471,104	2	954
2021-01-26	505	162,282	6,022	537	155,303	49	8,426	1,479,530	3	957
2021-01-27	580	162,862	6,166	436	155,739	44	11,419	1,490,949	0	957
2021-01-28	588	163,450	6,105	648	156,387	46	9,964	1,500,913	1	958
2021-01-29	658	164,108	6,247	516	156,903	49	11,338	1,512,251	0	958
2021-01-30	514	164,622	6,259	501	157,404	52	8,336	1,520,587	1	959
2021-01-31	635	165,257	6,367	527	157,931	58	8,994	1,529,581	0	959
Date	Confirmed cases			Recoveries		ICU	NP Swab Test		Deaths	
Date	New	Total	Active	New	Total	New	New	Total	New	Total
2021-02-01	586	165,843	6,408	545	158,476	54	8,681	1,538,262	0	959
2021-02-02	811	166,654	6,708	510	158,986	59	9,140	1,547,402	1	960
2021-02-03	756	167,410	6,906	557	159,543	65	9,621	1,557,023	1	961
2021-02-04	840	168,250	7,190	555	160,098	66	10,861	1,567,884	1	962
2021-02-05	940	169,190	7,672	456	160,554	68	11,497	1,579,381	2	964
2021-02-06	846	170,036	7,979	539	161,093	70	10,651	1,590,032	0	964
2021-02-07	962	170,998	8,494	445	161,538	83	9,409	1,599,441	2	966
2021-02-08	996	171,994	8,905	582	162,120	90	8,864	1,608,305	3	969
2021-02-09	1002	172,996	9,310	591	162,711	96	10,271	1,618,576	6	975
2021-02-10	987	173,983	9,739	553	163,264	108	10,812	1,629,388	5	980
2021-02-11	1048	175,031	10,151	631	163,895	114	10,659	1,640,047	5	985
2021-02-12	1021	176,052	10,523	642	164,537	122	11,240	1,651,287	7	992
2021-02-13	851	176,903	10,651	717	165,254	129	9,119	1,660,406	6	998
2021-02-14	798	177,701	10,679	765	166,019	133	7,514	1,667,920	5	1,003
2021-02-15	823	178,524	10,724	772	166,791	138	8,935	1,676,855	6	1,009
2021-02-16	964	179,488	10,873	810	167,601	141	10,328	1,687,183	5	1,014
2021-02-17	1017	180,505	11,066	819	168,420	139	10,276	1,697,459	5	1,019
2021-02-18	979	181,484	11,051	986	169,406	153	10,622	1,708,081	8	1,027
2021-02-19	976	182,460	11,100	920	170,326	148	10,016	1,718,097	7	1,034
2021-02-20	862	183,322	11,023	934	171,260	146	7,601	1,725,698	5	1,039
2021-02-21	768	184,090	10,819	967	172,227	147	6,006	1,731,704	5	1,044
2021-02-22	899	184,989	10,758	955	173,182	149	6,851	1,738,555	5	1,049
2021-02-23	1015	186,004	10,859	906	174,088	146	8,221	1,746,776	8	1,057
2021-02-24	1001	187,005	10,895	960	175,048	147	8,724	1,755,500	5	1,062
2021-02-25	1019	188,024	10,938	971	176,019	152	9,036	1,764,536	5	1,067
2021-02-26	1022	189,046	10,841	1,114	177,133	155	7,836	1,772,372	5	1,072
2021-02-27	844	189,890	10,615	1,064	178,197	158	5,704	1,778,076	6	1,078
2021-02-28	962	190,852	10,560	1,012	179,209	156	6,423	1,784,499	5	1,083
Date	Confirmed cases			Recoveries		ICU	NP Swab Test		Deaths	
Date	New	Total	Active	New	Total	New	New	Total	New	Total
2021-03-01	1,179	192,031	10,791	946	180,155	157	7,542	1,792,041	2	1,085
2021-03-02	1,341	193,372	11,161	964	181,119	160	8,586	1,800,627	7	1,092
2021-03-03	1,409	194,781	11,488	1,077	182,196	162	10,554	1,811,181	5	1,097
2021-03-04	1,716	196,497	12,071	1,125	183,321	167	11,208	1,822,389	8	1,105
2021-03-05	1,613	198,110	12,758	918	184,239	164	10,927	1,833,316	8	1,113
2021-03-06	1,318	199,428	13,077	992	185,231	168	7,966	1,841,282	7	1,120
2021-03-07	1,144	200,572	13,258	956	186,187	175	9,081	1,850,363	7	1,127
2021-03-08	1,326	201,898	13,643	935	187,122	180	9,215	1,859,578	6	1,133
2021-03-09	1,157	203,055	13,747	1,045	188,167	181	7,760	1,867,338	8	1,141
2021-03-10	1,333	204,388	14,089	988	189,155	188	9,797	1,877,135	3	1,144
2021-03-11	1,505	205,893	14,510	1,080	190,235	197	8,780	1,885,915	4	1,148
2021-03-12	1,356	207,249	14,676	1,182	191,417	195	7,807	1,893,722	8	1,156
2021-03-13	1,211	208,460	14,513	1,365	192,782	198	7,319	1,901,041	9	1,165
2021-03-14	1,063	209,523	14,179	1,390	194,172	209	6,173	1,907,214	7	1,172
2021-03-15	1,332	210,855	14,169	1,335	195,507	219	7,365	1,914,579	7	1,179
2021-03-16	1,314	212,169	14,162	1,314	196,821	215	9,317	1,923,896	7	1,186
2021-03-17	1,504	213,673	14,206	1,452	198,273	219	9,277	1,933,173	8	1,194
2021-03-18	1,394	215,067	14,316	1,276	199,549	222	8,776	1,941,949	8	1,202
2021-03-19	1,519	216,586	14,554	1,273	200,822	225	9,742	1,951,691	8	1,210
2021-03-20	1,347	217,933	14,510	1,386	202,208	230	8,447	1,960,138	5	1,215
2021-03-21	1,192	219,125	14,360	1,331	203,539	232	7,072	1,967,210	11	1,226
2021-03-22	1,330	220,455	14,244	1,439	204,978	246	9,079	1,976,289	7	1,233
2021-03-23	1,288	221,743	14,317	1,202	206,180	238	9,367	1,985,656	13	1,246
2021-03-24	1,299	223,042	14,394	1,212	207,392	238	9,000	1,994,656	10	1,256
2021-03-25	1,390	224,432	14,403	1,379	208,771	247	10,802	2,005,458	2	1,258
2021-03-26	1,548	225,980	14,686	1,253	210,024	242	9,656	2,015,114	12	1,270
2021-03-27	1,198	227,178	14,539	1,336	211,360	250	7,729	2,022,843	9	1,279
2021-03-28	1,121	228,299	14,417	1,236	212,596	251	6,852	2,029,695	7	1,286
2021-03-29	1,251	229,550	14,310	1,346	213,942	244	8,104	2,037,799	12	1,298
2021-03-30	1,271	230,821	14,263	1,308	215,250	240	9,494	2,047,293	10	1,308
2021-03-31	1,282	232,103	14,210	1,330	216,580	241	9,175	2,056,468	5	1,313
Date	Confirmed cases			Recoveries		ICU	NP Swab Test		Deaths	
Date	New	Total	Active	New	Total	New	New	Total	New	Total
2021-04-01	1,418	233,521	14,329	1,293	217,873	252	9,580	2,066,048	6	1,319
2021-04-02	1,233	234,754	14,170	1,384	219,257	241	9,450	2,075,498	8	1,327
2021-04-03	1,235	235,989	14,129	1,264	220,521	239	8,710	2,084,208	12	1,339
2021-04-04	1,203	237,192	13,896	1,422	221,943	224	8,369	2,092,577	14	1,353
2021-04-05	1,357	238,549	13,915	1,326	223,269	216	8,371	2,100,948	12	1,365
2021-04-06	1,403	239,952	13,878	1,432	224,701	216	10,095	2,111,043	8	1,373
2021-04-07	1,517	241,469	14,064	1,325	226,026	207	10,432	2,121,475	6	1,379
2021-04-08	1,379	242,848	14,205	1,234	227,260	226	9,680	2,131,155	4	1,383
2021-04-09	1,477	244,325	14,305	1,367	228,627	224	11,171	2,142,326	10	1,393
2021-04-10	1,379	245,704	14,455	1,219	229,846	226	9,169	2,151,495	10	1,403
2021-04-11	1,390	247,094	14,447	1,394	231,240	225	7,927	2,159,422	4	1,407
2021-04-12	1,635	248,729	14,761	1,316	232,556	228	9,625	2,169,047	5	1,412
2021-04-13	1,544	250,273	15,097	1,201	233,757	235	9,232	2,178,279	7	1,419
2021-04-14	1,402	251,675	15,199	1,296	235,053	237	8,880	2,187,159	4	1,423
2021-04-15	1,391	253,066	15,254	1,331	236,384	244	8,628	2,195,787	5	1,428
2021-04-16	1,406	254,472	15,369	1,283	237,667	247	9,260	2,205,047	8	1,436
2021-04-17	1,388	255,860	15,393	1,360	239,027	250	8,577	2,213,624	4	1,440
2021-04-18	1,127	256,987	15,074	1,438	240,465	250	6,269	2,219,893	8	1,448
2021-04-19	1,510	258,497	15,345	1,231	241,696	254	8,273	2,228,166	8	1,456
2021-04-20	1,371	259,868	15,344	1,360	243,056	248	8,405	2,236,571	12	1,468
2021-04-21	1,439	261,307	15,415	1,354	244,410	233	9,563	2,246,134	14	1,482
2021-04-22	1,459	262,766	15,449	1,414	245,824	229	9,995	2,256,129	11	1,493
2021-04-23	1,432	264,198	15,560	1,312	247,136	222	9,171	2,265,300	9	1,502
2021-04-24	1,206	265,404	15,260	1,497	248,633	219	7,518	2,272,818	9	1,511
2021-04-25	1,545	266,949	15,359	1,441	250,074	222	8,047	2,280,865	5	1,516
2021-04-26	1,286	268,235	15,197	1,437	251,511	220	7,781	2,288,646	11	1,527
2021-04-27	1,446	269,681	15,258	1,377	252,888	216	9,099	2,297,745	8	1,535
2021-04-28	1,464	271,145	15,176	1,535	254,423	216	9,670	2,307,415	11	1,546
2021-04-29	1,417	272,562	15,191	1,394	255,817	222	9,423	2,316,838	8	1,554
2021-04-30	1,429	273,991	15,167	1,444	257,261	219	9,865	2,326,703	9	1,563
Date	Confirmed cases			Recoveries		ICU	NP Swab Test		Deaths	
Date	New	Total	Active	New	Total	New	New	Total	New	Total
2021-05-01	1,279	275,270	15,102	1,338	258,599	220	8,194	2,334,897	6	1,569
2021-05-02	1,316	276,586	15,000	1,409	260,008	208	8,172	2,343,069	9	1,578
2021-05-03	1,246	277,832	14,873	1,361	261,369	207	8,869	2,351,938	12	1,590
2021-05-04	1,253	279,085	14,902	1,213	262,582	207	8,899	2,360,837	11	1,601
2021-05-05	1,451	280,536	14,832	1,512	264,094	205	9,428	2,370,265	9	1,610
2021-05-06	1,236	281,772	14,621	1,436	265,530	199	8,916	2,379,181	11	1,621
2021-05-07	1,209	282,981	14,436	1,387	266,917	206	9,604	2,388,785	7	1,628
2021-05-08	1,095	284,076	14,125	1,399	268,316	210	7,747	2,396,532	7	1,635
2021-05-09	992	285,068	13,790	1,317	269,633	210	7,204	2,403,736	10	1,645
2021-05-10	978	286,046	13,511	1,250	270,883	210	8,212	2,411,948	7	1,652
2021-05-11	1,153	287,199	13,416	1,240	272,123	198	9,274	2,421,222	8	1,660
2021-05-12	985	288,184	13,226	1,166	273,289	197	8,667	2,429,889	9	1,669
2021-05-13	1,059	289,243	13,015	1,265	274,554	197	9,040	2,438,929	5	1,674
2021-05-14	763	290,006	12,580	1,191	275,745	190	7,187	2,446,116	7	1,681
2021-05-15	795	290,801	12,322	1,047	276,792	194	6,991	2,453,107	6	1,687
2021-05-16	828	291,629	12,116	1,028	277,820	186	6,996	2,460,103	6	1,693
2021-05-17	861	292,490	11,970	1,004	278,824	191	7,570	2,467,673	3	1,696
2021-05-18	1,084	293,574	11,949	1,100	279,924	182	9,635	2,477,308	5	1,701
2021-05-19	1,119	294,693	12,050	1,016	280,940	185	9,716	2,487,024	2	1,703
2021-05-20	1,168	295,861	12,230	980	281,920	183	10,660	2,497,684	8	1,711
2021-05-21	1,345	297,206	12,574	993	282,913	171	11,314	2,508,998	8	1,719
2021-05-22	1,017	298,223	12,547	1,039	283,952	164	8,249	2,517,247	5	1,724
2021-05-23	992	299,215	12,363	1,166	285,118	153	8,396	2,525,643	10	1,734
2021-05-24	1,240	300,455	12,515	1,081	286,199	145	9,386	2,535,029	7	1,741
2021-05-25	1,408	301,863	12,760	1,158	287,357	146	10,812	2,545,841	5	1,746
2021-05-26	1,176	303,039	12,999	932	288,289	152	10,309	2,556,150	5	1,751
2021-05-27	1,160	304,199	13,077	1,078	289,367	153	10,774	2,566,924	4	1,755
2021-05-28	1,384	305,583	13,446	1,010	290,377	151	10,927	2,577,851	5	1,760
2021-05-29	1,134	306,717	13,432	1,144	291,521	148	9,729	2,587,580	4	1,764
2021-05-30	1,095	307,812	13,340	1,180	292,701	144	9,227	2,596,807	7	1,771
2021-05-31	1,410	309,222	13,551	1,198	293,899	150	10,962	2,607,769	1	1,772
Date	Confirmed cases			Recoveries		ICU	NP Swab Test		Deaths	
Date	New	Total	Active	New	Total	New	New	Total	New	Total
2021-06-01	1,279	310,501	13,754	1,073	294,972	143	10,932	2,618,701	3	1,775
2021-06-02	1,345	311,846	13,825	1,270	296,242	144	10,844	2,629,545	4	1,779
2021-06-03	1,443	313,289	14,177	1,087	297,329	146	11,043	2,640,588	4	1,783
2021-06-04	1,280	314,569	14,297	1,156	298,485	151	11,064	2,651,652	4	1,787
2021-06-05	1,331	315,900	14,311	1,310	299,795	149	9,350	2,661,002	7	1,794
2021-06-06	1,297	317,197	14,265	1,342	301,137	153	10,011	2,671,013	1	1,795
2021-06-07	1,479	318,676	14,485	1,256	302,393	153	11,911	2,682,924	3	1,798
2021-06-08	1,581	320,257	14,819	1,244	303,637	156	11,610	2,694,534	3	1,801
2021-06-09	1,391	321,648	14,926	1,279	304,916	158	10,396	2,704,930	5	1,806
2021-06-10	1,709	323,357	15,315	1,316	306,232	160	12,669	2,717,599	4	1,810
2021-06-11	1,657	325,014	15,689	1,280	307,512	159	13,757	2,731,356	3	1,813
2021-06-12	1,437	326,451	15,805	1,317	308,829	161	10,067	2,741,423	4	1,817
2021-06-13	1,512	327,963	16,048	1,266	310,095	170	11,121	2,752,544	3	1,820
2021-06-14	1,563	329,526	16,139	1,464	311,559	172	11,316	2,763,860	8	1,828
2021-06-15	1,487	331,013	16,332	1,291	312,850	185	11,645	2,775,505	3	1,831
2021-06-16	1,557	332,570	16,515	1,368	314,218	186	12,908	2,788,413	6	1,837
2021-06-17	1,646	334,216	16,729	1,427	315,645	196	12,448	2,800,861	5	1,842
2021-06-18	1,658	335,874	16,992	1,386	317,031	202	14,256	2,815,117	9	1,851
2021-06-19	1,497	337,371	17,090	1,388	318,419	209	10,365	2,825,482	11	1,862
2021-06-20	1,661	339,032	17,277	1,466	319,885	204	11,984	2,837,466	8	1,870
2021-06-21	1,935	340,967	17,797	1,408	321,293	227	13,536	2,851,002	7	1,877
2021-06-22	1,962	342,929	18,144	1,604	322,897	238	13,869	2,864,871	11	1,888
2021-06-23	1,870	344,799	18,327	1,681	324,578	259	14,678	2,879,549	6	1,894
2021-06-24	1,761	346,560	18,555	1,524	326,102	267	13,771	2,893,320	9	1,903
2021-06-25	1,702	348,262	18,615	1,632	327,734	271	14,191	2,907,511	10	1,913
2021-06-26	1,661	349,923	18,581	1,689	329,423	265	13,834	2,921,345	6	1,919
2021-06-27	1,558	351,481	18,533	1,592	331,015	272	12,218	2,933,563	14	1,933
2021-06-28	1,652	353,133	18,512	1,663	332,678	280	13,772	2,947,335	10	1,943
2021-06-29	1,718	354,851	18,445	1,767	334,445	288	14,314	2,961,649	18	1,961
2021-06-30	1,836	356,687	18,596	1,677	336,122	296	14,887	2,976,536	8	1,969
Date	Confirmed cases			Recoveries		ICU	NP Swab Test		Deaths	
Date	New	Total	Active	New	Total	New	New	Total	New	Total
2021-07-01	1,824	358,511	18,703	1,707	337,829	294	16,000	2,992,536	10	1,979
2021-07-02	1,895	360,406	18,807	1,775	339,604	296	16,630	3,009,166	16	1,995
2021-07-03	1,612	362,018	18,536	1,873	341,477	299	12,216	3,021,382	10	2,005
2021-07-04	1,654	363,672	18,390	1,788	343,265	301	12,750	3,034,132	12	2,017
2021-07-05	1,977	365,649	18,514	1,841	345,106	303	15,209	3,049,341	12	2,029
2021-07-06	1,993	367,642	18,600	1,887	346,993	310	14,850	3,064,191	20	2,049
2021-07-07	1,585	369,227	18,318	1,857	348,850	307	14,439	3,078,630	10	2,059
2021-07-08	1,705	370,932	18,390	1,621	350,471	316	15,332	3,093,962	12	2,071
2021-07-09	1,617	372,549	18,252	1,737	352,208	321	15,878	3,109,840	18	2,089
2021-07-10	1,555	374,104	18,068	1,728	353,936	326	13,786	3,123,626	11	2,100
2021-07-11	1,490	375,594	17,915	1,626	355,562	321	12,501	3,136,127	17	2,117
2021-07-12	1,770	377,364	17,972	1,694	357,256	331	15,072	3,151,199	19	2,136
2021-07-13	1,712	379,076	17,904	1,769	359,025	333	14,510	3,165,709	11	2,147
2021-07-14	1,623	380,699	17,795	1,721	360,746	336	15,312	3,181,021	11	2,158
2021-07-15	1,385	382,084	17,517	1,647	362,393	341	15,330	3,196,351	16	2,174
2021-07-16	1,263	383,347	17,162	1,599	363,992	333	14,314	3,210,665	19	2,193
2021-07-17	1,226	384,573	16,855	1,515	365,507	330	13,631	3,224,296	18	2,211
2021-07-18	1,189	385,762	16,606	1,428	366,935	328	14,690	3,238,986	10	2,221
2021-07-19	1,107	386,869	16,211	1,485	368,420	322	12,316	3,251,302	17	2,238
2021-07-20	1,043	387,912	15,928	1,317	369,737	323	13,140	3,264,442	9	2,247
2021-07-21	969	388,881	15,501	1,388	371,125	326	12,558	3,277,000	8	2,255
2021-07-22	987	389,868	15,246	1,233	372,358	316	12,685	3,289,685	9	2,264
2021-07-23	926	390,794	15,014	1,149	373,507	322	12,249	3,301,934	9	2,273
2021-07-24	987	391,781	14,516	1,479	374,986	318	12,466	3,314,400	6	2,279
2021-07-25	836	392,617	14,235	1,112	376,098	310	11,957	3,326,357	5	2,284
2021-07-26	988	393,605	13,878	1,336	377,434	317	14,116	3,340,473	9	2,293
2021-07-27	933	394,538	13,430	1,376	378,810	301	12,442	3,352,915	5	2,298
2021-07-28	941	395,479	13,001	1,365	380,175	310	12,537	3,365,452	5	2,303
2021-07-29	853	396,332	12,448	1,400	381,575	310	12,916	3,378,368	6	2,309
2021-07-30	766	397,098	11,958	1,251	382,826	307	13,140	3,391,508	5	2,314
2021-07-31	733	397,831	11,449	1,236	384,062	306	13,104	3,404,612	6	2,320
Date	Confirmed cases			Recoveries		ICU	NP Swab Test		Deaths	
Date	New	Total	Active	New	Total	New	New	Total	New	Total
2021-08-01	707	398,538	10,809	1,339	385,401	291	12,410	3,417,022	8	2,328
2021-08-02	805	399,343	10,314	1,289	386,690	288	13,951	3,430,973	11	2,339
2021-08-03	785	400,128	9,951	1,142	387,832	285	13,701	3,444,674	6	2,345
2021-08-04	851	400,979	9,748	1,048	388,880	267	12,515	3,457,189	6	2,351
2021-08-05	718	401,697	9,543	918	389,798	271	14,083	3,471,272	5	2,356
2021-08-06	596	402,293	9,173	961	390,759	256	14,903	3,486,175	5	2,361
2021-08-07	501	402,794	8,829	840	391,599	244	14,217	3,500,392	5	2,366
2021-08-08	555	403,349	8,630	751	392,350	243	10,884	3,511,276	3	2,369
2021-08-09	519	403,868	8,312	834	393,184	236	15,482	3,526,758	3	2,372
2021-08-10	595	404,463	8,131	773	393,957	230	14,896	3,541,654	3	2,375
2021-08-11	424	404,887	7,805	747	394,704	226	11,469	3,553,123	3	2,378
2021-08-12	555	405,442	7,714	644	395,348	223	12,619	3,565,742	2	2,380
2021-08-13	417	405,859	7,526	602	395,950	214	12,621	3,578,363	3	2,383
2021-08-14	375	406,234	7,207	691	396,641	213	9,978	3,588,341	3	2,386
2021-08-15	306	406,540	6,904	606	397,247	205	10,757	3,599,098	3	2,389
2021-08-16	343	406,883	6,623	620	397,867	198	11,833	3,610,931	4	2,393
2021-08-17	256	407,139	6,351	526	398,393	187	10,259	3,621,190	2	2,395
2021-08-18	237	407,376	5,944	642	399,035	182	9,900	3,631,090	2	2,397
2021-08-19	276	407,652	5,715	503	399,538	276	12,010	3,643,100	2	2,399
2021-08-20	226	407,878	5,329	610	400,148	173	11,934	3,655,034	2	2,401
2021-08-21	200	408,078	4,929	598	400,746	158	10,543	3,665,577	2	2,403
2021-08-22	167	408,245	4,524	571	401,317	153	9,878	3,675,455	1	2,404
2021-08-23	189	408,434	4,190	520	401,837	132	11,840	3,687,295	3	2,407
2021-08-24	166	408,600	3,771	583	402,420	112	11,923	3,699,218	2	2,409
2021-08-25	197	408,797	3,453	512	402,932	112	11,650	3,710,868	3	2,412
2021-08-26	212	409,009	3,175	488	403,420	109	13,264	3,724,132	2	2,414
2021-08-27	168	409,177	2,910	432	403,852	99	14,504	3,738,636	1	2,415
2021-08-28	186	409,363	2,730	365	404,217	89	11,653	3,750,289	1	2,416
2021-08-29	189	409,552	2,577	341	404,558	89	10,784	3,761,073	1	2,417
2021-08-30	184	409,736	2,463	297	404,855	88	13,065	3,774,138	1	2,418
2021-08-31	124	409,860	2,373	213	405,068	90	12,425	3,786,563	1	2,419
Date	Confirmed cases			Recoveries		ICU	NP Swab Test		Deaths	
Date	New	Total	Active	New	Total	New	New	Total	New	Total
2021-09-01	101	409,961	2,221	252	405,320	84	12,561	3,799,124	1	2,420
2021-09-02	111	410,072	2,181	150	405,470	75	12,336	3,811,460	1	2,421
2021-09-03	95	410,167	2,162	113	405,583	64	13,578	3,825,038	1	2,422
2021-09-04	103	410,270	2,077	187	405,770	59	12,876	3,837,914	1	2,423
2021-09-05	72	410,342	1,960	188	405,958	50	12,082	3,849,996	1	2,424
2021-09-06	71	410,413	1,851	179	406,137	46	11,870	3,861,866	1	2,425
2021-09-07	83	410,496	1,737	196	406,333	43	13,789	3,875,655	1	2,426
2021-09-08	66	410,562	1,614	188	406,521	38	13,114	3,888,769	1	2,427
2021-09-09	69	410,631	1,502	180	406,701	40	13,780	3,902,549	1	2,428
2021-09-10	62	410,693	1,409	154	406,855	38	15,501	3,918,050	1	2,429
2021-09-11	41	410,734	1,303	146	407,001	37	13,757	3,931,807	1	2,430
2021-09-12	50	410,784	1,208	144	407,145	36	12,585	3,944,392	1	2,431
2021-09-13	58	410,842	1,148	117	407,262	32	14,661	3,959,053	1	2,432
2021-09-14	59	410,901	1,071	134	407,396	28	14,745	3,973,798	2	2,434
2021-09-15	59	410,960	1,002	127	407,523	21	14,788	3,988,586	1	2,435
2021-09-16	58	411,018	962	97	407,620	23	14,694	4,003,280	1	2,436
2021-09-17	63	411,081	932	92	407,712	20	15,969	4,019,249	1	2,437
2021-09-18	43	411,124	862	112	407,824	17	14,503	4,033,752	1	2,438
2021-09-19	56	411,180	833	84	407,908	16	16,399	4,050,151	1	2,439
2021-09-20	53	411,233	783	102	408,010	16	20,509	4,070,660	1	2,440
2021-09-21	45	411,278	736	91	408,101	16	20,750	4,091,410	1	2,441
2021-09-22	38	411,316	715	58	408,159	14	15,197	4,106,607	1	2,442
2021-09-23	42	411,358	691	65	408,224	11	16,999	4,123,606	1	2,443
2021-09-24	48	411,406	679	59	408,283	12	19,515	4,143,121	1	2,444
2021-09-25	41	411,447	664	55	408,338	13	15,894	4,159,015	1	2,445
2021-09-26	37	411,484	656	44	408,382	12	18,701	4,177,716	1	2,446
2021-09-27	49	411,533	662	42	408,424	10	19,982	4,197,698	1	2,447
2021-09-28	39	411,572	665	35	408,459	10	17,867	4,215,565	1	2,448
2021-09-29	33	411,605	658	40	408,499	9	16,506	4,232,071	0	2,448
2021-09-30	50	411,655	661	46	408,545	11	16,383	4,248,454	1	2,449
Date	New	Total	Active	New	Total	New	New	Total	New	Total
Date	Confirmed cases			Recoveries		ICU	NP Swab Test		Deaths	
Sources: Official information : corona.e.gov.kw; Ministry of Health : moh.gov.kw; Ministry of Health (Twitter) : @Kuwait_MoH; Ministry of Health (Instagram) : @Kuwait_MoH; Ministry of Health (YouTube) : Youtube Channel; Center for Government Communication : cgc.gov.kw; Center for Government Communication (Twitter) : @CGCKuwait; Notes:

== Statistics ==
=== Confirmed new cases per day ===
View source data.

=== Confirmed deaths per day ===
View source data.

== Action taken on the deceased ==
April 16: The Director of Funeral Affairs Department of Kuwait Municipality, revealed that the administration had buried three bodies who had died due to the Coronavirus, without washing them. Ministry of Health has issued direct orders that in the event of death due to the virus, the deceased is placed in a completely closed sterile bag which does not open. The burial procedures are as per usual proceeding and the selection of graves is according to the established numerical sequence, and therefore there are no places designated for those who died with the virus. In addition, only three people with the deceased were allowed to enter and attend the burial which takes place in the cemetery. Kuwaiti MP Khalīl aṣ-Ṣaliḥ suggested that medical workers who die fighting the pandemic be treated as martyrs, under the martyrs' office, which controls the affairs of families of people who died fighting off the Iraqi invasion of Kuwait.

== Response ==
Kuwait ended the full curfew on 30 May 2020 and started taking steps towards a gradual return to normal life by placing a partial curfew from 6 pm until 6 am. This step was a first of five with each phase tentatively lasting for 3 weeks which could vary depending on the assessment by the Ministry of Health. Initially, the country started with a voluntary stay-at-home approach from midnight of 11 March, with the government suspending work across all government sectors except emergency services. All commercial air travel and border travel were suspended from midnight of 14 March 2020 (start of 15 March 2020). Partial curfew was implemented from 22 March 2020 where curfew hours were between 5 pm until 4 am. This was amended on 6 April, where end of curfew hours were extended from 4 am to 6 am. With the start of the holy month of Ramadan on 24 April 2020, the partial curfew was further amended to 4 pm until 8 am with special permissions for deliveries from 5 pm until 1 am (under strict health code conditions). On 10 May, the country was placed under full curfew based on the assessment of the Ministry of Health, until 31 May 2020. Then again, a curfew of one month was imposed from 5 p.m. until 5 a.m. starting 7 March 2021 until 8 April 2021, after 1,716 new coronavirus cases were recorded on 4 March 2021.

All commercial flights were suspended on 13 March, with an exception for cargo flights. A public holiday was declared from 12 to 26 March, with work to resume on 29 March. Some shops were closed, and restrictions were placed on restaurants. Authorities asked people to stay home for Friday prayers, saying "The doors of the mosques will stay closed" and citing a fatwa allowing people not to attend prayers in mosques. Classes were suspended from 1 to 12 March, which was extended to 29 March, and later to 4 August.

Visas were partially suspended, and quarantines required for all arrivals from certain high-risk countries. Arrivals at Kuwait International Airport from other countries were required to self-quarantine for 14 days. The borders with Iraq and Saudi Arabia were closed.

Food exports were banned, and Minister of Commerce & Industry Khalid Al Roudan reassured people that the country had enough food and shipping was continuing.

On 15 March, Interior Minister Anas Khalid Al-Saleh told people to follow the measures imposed by the government and stop going out unnecessarily. He warned that curfews or deportations could be used if people failed to comply.

On 1 April 2021, Kuwait has extended the curfew until 22 April from 7 p.m. to 5 a.m.

== Impacts ==
=== Academic Studies ===
The suspension of the schools was needed to avoid the spread of the coronavirus in children, teenagers and younger people (Kindergarten up to university level). The high school graduates (Grade 12 seniors) were the most affected by the suspension since graduation is usually in May–June yearly. The academic year was resumed in September 2021.

=== Economics ===
The strategic planning and surplus for food and supplies was estimated to be for six months by the Kuwaiti government during lockdown. All supermarkets and grocery stores had all usual products as pre-pandemic, before the border closure or the imposed partial curfew.

However, small businesses were most affected, losing large sums of money due to lockdown having to pay rent high rent and salaries to workers. The government have promised packages and solutions to ensure these businesses are compensated for these unfortunate circumstances with the partial lockdown. However, compensation was never given to those small business owners after the pandemic.

=== People ===
People were confined to their homes. However, there was a tendency to rush to buy supplies in non-curfew hours (6 a.m. to 5 p.m.), even though the Kuwaiti government have reiterated that goods and supplies was to last six months.

The partial lockdown, staying at home and physical distancing has led to theaters, malls, department stores, and entertainment venues to be closed. Gyms and restaurants were also closed due to the coronavirus.

Due to raising cases and to help curb the spread of the pandemic coronavirus Kuwait has total full-time curfew from 4 p.m. on Sunday 10 May 2020 until 30 May 2020 . Above all of that, the ministry has provided people with website links to book an appointment so they can go out to supermarket buy their needs or for the hospital.

=== Medical personnel ===
At least 105 medical personnel, including doctors, nurses, pharmacists, and other professions, were infected with the virus as of 27 April 2020.
