= 45th Cabinet of Kuwait =

Chief executive body of the state of Kuwait

The Cabinet of Kuwait is the chief executive body of the State of Kuwait. The 45th cabinet in the history of Kuwait was appointed on 17 January 2024. On 4 January 2024, Amir of Kuwait His Highness Sheikh Mishal Al-Ahmad Al-Jaber Al-Sabah assigned His Highness Sheikh Mohammad Sabah Al-Salem Al-Sabah as Prime Minister. The Amir has also assigned the Prime Minister to refer the cabinet line-up for their appointment. On 17 January 2024, the new cabinet line up was announced after the Amir approved in an Amiri order. On 6 April 2024, Prime Minister submits cabinet resignation to Kuwait Amir according to Article 57 of the constitution. On 7 April 2024, Kuwait Amir accepts government resignations, instructs it to act as caretaker. The government will function as care-taker until the formation of the new government.

Incumbent	Office	Website	Since
Mohammad Sabah Al-Salem Al-Sabah	Prime Minister	pm.gov.kw	4 January 2024 – 7 April 2024
Fahad Yusuf Al-Sabah	Deputy Prime Minister and Minister of Defense	mod.gov.kw	17 January 2024 – 7 April 2024
Fahad Yusuf Al-Sabah(Acting)	Minister of Interior	moi.gov.kw	17 January 2024 – 7 April 2024
Dr. Imad Mohammad Alatiqi	Deputy Prime Minister and Minister of Oil	moo.gov.kw	17 January 2024 – 7 April 2024
Abdulrahman Badah Al Mutairi	Minister of Information and Culture	media.gov.kw	17 January 2024 – 7 April 2024
Dr. Ahmad Abdulwahab Al-Awadhi	Minister of Health	moh.gov.kw	17 January 2024 – 7 April 2024
Feras Saud Al-Malek Al-Sabah	Minister of Social Affairs, Family and Childhood Affairs	mosa.gov.kw	17 January 2024 – 7 April 2024
Feras Saud Al-Malek Al-Sabah(Acting)	Minister of State for Cabinet Affairs	cmgs.gov.kw	17 January 2024 – 7 April 2024
Dr. Anwar Ali Al-Mudhaf	Minister of Finance and Minister of State for Economic and Investment Affairs	mof.gov.kw	17 January 2024 – 7 April 2024
Dr. Salem Falah Al-Hajraf	Minister of Electricity, Water and Renewable Energy and Minister of State for Housing Affairs	mew.gov.kw pahw.gov.kw	17 January 2024 – 7 April 2024
Dawood Sulaiman Marafie	Minister of State for National Assembly Affairs, Minister of State for Youth Affairs and Minister of State for Communication	mona.gov.kw youth.gov.kw moc.gov.kw	17 January 2024 – 7 April 2024
Dr. Adel Mohammad Al-Adwani	Minister of Education, Minister of Higher Education and Scientific Research	moe.edu.kw	17 January 2024 – 7 April 2024
Abdullah Hamad Al-Jo'an	Minister of Commerce and Industry	moci.gov.kw	17 January 2024 – 7 April 2024
Abdullah Ali Al-Yahya	Minister of Foreign Affairs	mofa.gov.kw	17 January 2024 – 7 April 2024
Faisal Saeed Al-Ghareeb	Minister of Justice and Minister of Awqaf (Endowment) and Islamic Affairs	moj.gov.kw awqaf.gov.kw	17 January 2024 – 7 April 2024
Dr. Nora Mohammad Al-Mashaan	Minister of Public Works and Minister of State for Municipal Affairs	mpw.gov.kw baladia.gov.kw	17 January 2024 – 7 April 2024
