= 42nd Cabinet of Kuwait =

Chief executive body of the state of Kuwait

The Cabinet of Kuwait is the chief executive body of the State of Kuwait. The 42nd cabinet in the history of Kuwait was appointed on 16 October 2022. On 5 October 2022, Amir of Kuwait His Highness Sheikh Nawaf Al-Ahmad Al-Jaber Al-Sabah assigned His Highness Sheikh Ahmad Nawaf Al-Ahmad Al-Sabah as Prime Minister to assign what was, the 41st Cabinet of Kuwait. But due to strong backlash from MPs and citizens about some of the recurring ministers returning, on 6 October 2022, the Prime Minister tendered a letter of governmental resignation to the Crown Prince a day after its formation, making it the shortest-lived government in Kuwaiti history.

The Prime Minister has launched consultations with the members of the National Assembly aimed at advancing consensus on forming the new government. Some MPs called this step a heroic action and that this shows that the Prime Minister is "a man of the country and the ally of the people". On 16 October 2022, 16 days after the formation of the 41st cabinet, the 42nd cabinet was announced to the public. On 23 January 2023, the cabinet tendered a letter of resignation to the Crown Prince which was accepted on 26 January 2023. The government will function as care-taker until the formation of the new government.

== Cabinet members ==
Incumbent	Office	Portrait	Website	Since
Ahmad Nawaf Al-Ahmad Al-Sabah	Prime Minister		www.pm.gov.kw	16 October 2022 – 26 January 2023
Talal Khaled Al-Ahmad Al-Sabah	First Deputy Prime Minister and Minister of Interior		www.moi.gov.kw	16 October 2022 – 26 January 2023
Barak Ali Al-Sheetan	Deputy Prime Minister and Minister of State for Cabinet Affairs		www.cmgs.gov.kw/	16 October 2022 – 26 January 2023
Bader Al-Mulla	Deputy Prime Minister and Minister of Oil		www.moo.gov.kw	16 October 2022 – 26 January 2023
Abdulrahman Badah Al-Mutairi	Minister of Information and Culture and Minister of State for Youth Affairs		www.media.gov.kw www.youth.gov.kw	16 October 2022 – 26 January 2023
Abdulwahab Mohammad Al-Rushaid	Minister of Finance and Minister of State for Economic and Investment Affairs		www.mof.gov.kw	16 October 2022 – 26 January 2023
Ahmad Abdulwahab Al-Awadhi	Minister of Health		www.moh.gov.kw	16 October 2022 – 26 January 2023
Amani Sulaiman Buqamaz	Minister of Public Works and Minister of Electricity, Water and Renewable Energy		www.mpw.gov.kw www.mew.gov.kw	16 October 2022 – 26 January 2023
Hamad Abdulwahab Al-Adwani	Minister of Education and Minister of Higher Education and Scientific Research		www.moe.edu.kwwww.mohe.edu.kw	16 October 2022 – 26 January 2023
Salem Abdullah Al-Jaber Al-Sabah	Minister of Foreign Affairs		www.mofa.gov.kw	16 October 2022 – 26 January 2023
Abdulaziz Majid Al-Majid	Minister of Justice and Minister of Awqaf and Islamic Affairs and Minister of State for Nazaha (Integrity) Enhancement		www.moj.gov.kw www.awqaf.gov.kw www.nazaha.gov.kw	16 October 2022 – 26 January 2023
Abdulaziz Waleed Al-Mu'jil	Minister of State for Municipal Affairs		www.baladia.gov.kw	16 October 2022 – 26 January 2023
Sheikh Abdullah Ali Abdullah Al-Salem Al-Sabah	Minister of Defense		www.mod.gov.kw	16 October 2022 – 26 January 2023
Amaar Mohammed Al-Ajmi	Minister of State for National Assembly Affairs and Minister of State for Housing Affairs and Urban Development		www.mona.gov.kw www.pahw.gov.kw	16 October 2022 – 26 January 2023
Maazin Saad Al-Nahidh	Minister of Commerce and Industry and Minister of State for Communication and Information Technology Affairs		www.moci.gov.kw www.cait.gov.kw	16 October 2022 – 26 January 2023
Mai Jassem Al-Baghli	Minister of Social Affairs and Community Development and Minister of State for Women and Childhood Affairs		www.mosa.gov.kw	16 October 2022 – 26 January 2023
