= 43rd Cabinet of Kuwait =

Chief executive body of the state of Kuwait

The Cabinet of Kuwait is the chief executive body of the State of Kuwait. The 43rd cabinet in the history of Kuwait was appointed on 9 April 2023. On 5 March 2023, Amir of Kuwait His Highness Sheikh Nawaf Al-Ahmad Al-Jaber Al-Sabah assigned His Highness Sheikh Ahmad Nawaf Al-Ahmad Al-Sabah as Prime Minister . The Amir has also assigned the Prime Minister to refer the cabinet line-up for their appointment. On 9 April 2023, the new cabinet line up was announced after the Amir approved in an Amiri order. On 9 May 2023, Amir of Kuwait accepted the resignation of the Minister of Oil & Minister of State for National Affairs. On 9 May 2023, an Amiri Decree has been issued appointing the finance minister. On 7 June 2023, the Prime Minister tendered a letter of governmental resignation to the Crown Prince. On 7 June 2023, the Emir accepted the government resignation. The government will function as care-taker until the formation of the new government.

Incumbent	Office	Website	Since
Ahmad Nawaf Al-Ahmad Al-Sabah	Prime Minister	pm.gov.kw	5 March 2023 – 7 June 2023
Talal Khaled Al-Ahmad Al-Sabah	First Deputy Prime Minister, Minister of Interior and Minister of Defense	moi.gov.kw mod.gov.kw	9 April 2023 – 7 June 2023
Dr. Khaled Mohammad Al-Fadhel	Deputy Prime Minister and Minister of State for Cabinet Affairs		9 April 2023 – 7 June 2023
Dr. Bader Hamed Al-Mullah	Deputy Prime Minister and Minister of Oil and Minister of State for National Assembly Affairs	moo.gov.kw mona.gov.kw	9 April 2023 – 9 May 2023
Manaf Abdulaziz Al-Hajeri (Acting)	Minister of Oil and Minister of State for National Assembly Affairs	moo.gov.kw mona.gov.kw	9 May 2023 – 7 June 2023
Fahad Ali Al-Shu'la	Minister of State for Municipal Affairs and Minister of State for Communication and Information Technology	www.baladia.gov.kw moc.gov.kw	9 April 2023 – 7 June 2023
Abdulrahman Badah Al Mutairi	Minister of Information and Minister of State for Youth Affairs	media.gov.kw youth.gov.kw	9 April 2023 – 7 June 2023
Dr. Ahmad Abdulwahab Al-Awadhi	Minister of Health	www.moh.gov.kw	9 April 2023 – 7 June 2023
Dr. Amani Sulaiman Buqamaz	Minister of Public Works	www.mpw.gov.kw	9 April 2023 – 7 June 2023
Dr. Hamad Abdulwahab Hamad Al-Adwani	Minister of Education and Minister of Higher Education and Scientific Research	moe.edu.kw	9 April 2023 – 7 June 2023
Salem Abdullah Al-Jaber Al-Sabah	Minister of Foreign Affairs	www.mofa.gov.kw	9 April 2023 – 7 June 2023
Mai Jassim Muhammad Al-Baghli	Minister of Social Affairs and Community Development and Minister of State for Women and Childhood Affairs	www.mosa.gov.kw	9 April 2023 – 7 June 2023
Dr. Amer Mohammad Ali Mohammad	Minister of Justice, Minister of Awqaf (Endowment) and Islamic Affairs	moj.gov.kw www.awqaf.gov.kw	9 April 2023 – 7 June 2023
Mutlaq Naif Al-Otaibi	Minister of Electricity, Water and Renewable Energy and Minister of State for Housing Affairs	mew.gov.kw www.pahw.gov.kw	9 April 2023 – 7 June 2023
Mohammad Othman Al-Eyban	Minister of Commerce and Industry	moci.gov.kw	9 April 2023 – 7 June 2023
Manaf Abdulaziz Al-Hajeri	Minister of Finance and Minister of State for Economic and Investment Affairs	mof.gov.kw	9 April 2023 – 7 June 2023
