= 40th Cabinet of Kuwait =

Chief executive body of the state of Kuwait

The Cabinet of Kuwait is the chief executive body of the State of Kuwait. The 40th cabinet in the history of Kuwait was appointed on 1 August 2022. On 24 July 2022, Amir of Kuwait His Highness Sheikh Nawaf Al-Ahmad Al-Jaber Al-Sabah assigned His Highness Sheikh Ahmad Nawaf Al-Ahmad Al-Sabah as Prime Minister. The Amir has also assigned the Prime Minister to refer the cabinet line-up for their appointment. On 1 August 2022, the new cabinet line-up was announced after the Amir approved in an Amiri order. On 2 October 2022, the Prime Minister tendered a letter of governmental resignation to the Crown Prince. The government will function as care-taker until the formation of the new government.

Incumbent	Office	Website	Since
Ahmad Nawaf Al-Ahmad Al-Sabah	Prime Minister	pm.gov.kw	1 August 2022 – 2 October 2022
Talal Khaled Al-Ahmad Al-Sabah	First Deputy Prime Minister, Minister of Defense and Acting Minister of Interior	moi.gov.kw mod.gov.kw	1 August 2022 – 2 October 2022
Dr. Mohammad Abdullatif Al-Fares	Deputy Prime Minister and Minister of Oil	moo.gov.kw	1 August 2022 – 2 October 2022
Issa Ahmed Al Kandri	Minister of State for Housing Affairs and Urban Development	www.pahw.gov.kw	1 August 2022 – 29 August 2022
Dr. Rana Abdullah Al-Fares (Acting)	Minister of State for Housing Affairs and Urban Development	www.pahw.gov.kw	29 August 2022 – 2 October 2022
Issa Ahmed Al Kandri	Minister of State for National Assembly Affairs	mona.gov.kw	1 August 2022 – 29 August 2022
Dr. Mohammad Abdullatif Al-Fares (Acting	Deputy Prime Minister and Minister of State for National Assembly Affairs	mona.gov.kw	29 August 2022 – 2 October 2022
Dr. Ahmad Nasser Al-Mohammad Al-Sabah	Minister of Foreign Affairs	www.mofa.gov.kw	1 August 2022 – 2 October 2022
Dr. Rana Abdullah Al-Fares	Minister of State for Municipal Affairs and Minister of State for Communication and Information Technology	www.baladia.gov.kw moc.gov.kw	1 August 2022 – 2 October 2022
Abdulrahman Badah Al Mutairi	Minister of Information and Minister of State for Youth Affairs	media.gov.kw youth.gov.kw	1 August 2022 – 2 October 2022
Dr. Ali Fahad Al Madhaf	Minister of Education and Minister of Higher Education and Scientific Research	moe.edu.kw	1 August 2022 – 2 October 2022
Jamal Hadhel Al Jalawi	Minister of Justice, Minister of State for Nazaha (Integrity) Enhancement, and Minister of Awqaf (Endowment) and Islamic Affairs	moj.gov.kw www.nazaha.gov.kw www.awqaf.gov.kw	1 August 2022 – 2 October 2022
Dr. Khaled Mhawes Al-Saeed	Minister of Health	www.moh.gov.kw	1 August 2022 – 2 October 2022
Dr. Abdulwahab Mohammad Al-Rushaid	Minister of Finance and Minister of State for Economic and Investment Affairs	mof.gov.kw	1 August 2022 – 2 October 2022
Ali Hussein Al-Mousa	Minister of Public Works and Minister of Electricity, Water and Renewable Energy	www.mpw.gov.kw mew.gov.kw	1 August 2022 – 2 October 2022
Fahad Mutlaq Al-Shurai'an	Minister of Commerce and Industry and Minister of Social Affairs and Community Development	moci.gov.kw www.mosa.gov.kw	1 August 2022 – 2 October 2022
