= Age restrictions on energy drinks by country =

As of January 2026: No age restriction Sale prohibited to persons under 14 (North Macedonia only) Sale prohibited to persons under 16 Sale prohibited to persons under 18 Sale prohibited to persons under 21 (Kazakhstan only) No available information

This is a list of age restrictions on energy drinks by country. This list compares laws that set a minimum purchase age (or otherwise restrict sales) of energy drinks for minors.

In most jurisdictions there is no national age-of-sale law, however many Eastern European and Central Asian countries prohibit the sale of energy drinks to under-18s. In 2014, Lithuania became one of the first such jurisdictions to ban the sale of energy drinks to minors.

Many countries have adopted caffeine warning labels (e.g., under Regulation (EU) No 1169/2011) and voluntary retail policies to dissuade minors from purchasing energy drinks. Public-health bodies in several countries advise that high-caffeine drinks are not recommended for children.

In some countries, retailers apply a sales policy restricting the sale of energy drinks to minors, even though local laws do not prohibit their sale.

== Countries with a national legal age-of-sale restriction ==
Country	Minimum age	Notes
Albania	18	Sale of energy drinks to persons under 18 is prohibited. A further proposal in 2018 to ban sodas for persons under 18 was rejected due to pressure from companies and restaurant chains.
Armenia	18	Prohibits sale of energy drinks to persons under 18; also bans vending-machine sales and restricts advertising.
Azerbaijan	18	Sale of energy drinks to persons under 18 prohibited by sanitary norms; rules announced in 2019 and in force from 1 January 2020.
Belarus	18	National ban on sales to minors effective 8 July 2021.
Bulgaria	18	Parliament adopted amendments introducing a ban on the use, offering, and sale of high-caffeine products (energy drinks) to children (under 18), via changes to the Child Protection Act in 2025.
Croatia	18	A nationwide ban on the sale of energy drinks to minors took effect on 1 June 2026.
Honduras	18	Prohibits sale and consumption of energy drinks to persons under 18 nationwide; also prohibits sales in schools, health and sports establishments; implementing regulation published by Secretaría de Desarrollo Económico (SDE). It became the first Latin American country to implement the age restriction.
Hungary	18	Parliament adopted a national ban on sales to under-18s in 2025; enforcement applies in stores and delivery.
Kazakhstan	21	National law sets 21+ minimum for energy drinks. It is the country with the highest age restriction for energy drinks in the world.
Kosovo	18	Draft law approved in principle on 5 December 2024; not yet in force pending final adoption/promulgation.
Kuwait	18	Ministerial Decision No. 558/2012 (Ministry of Commerce & Industry) prohibits sale/consumption of energy drinks to persons under 16; a subsequent ministerial guideline (Decision No. 470/2013) lists implementing details and labeling/retail requirements. On 24 December 2025, the age limit was raised to 18 via a ministerial decree by the Minister of Health, Ahmad Abdulwahab Al-Awadhi. The Ministry of Health cited this age change as part of greater endeavors to “protect public health, particularly among youth”. It became the first Middle Eastern and Muslim-majority country in the world to implement age restrictions on energy drinks.
Kyrgyzstan	18	National ban on sales to minors since 2017.
Latvia	18	Law prohibits sales to under-18s; also restricts retail placement and vending machines.
Lithuania	18	National ban effective 1 November 2014. It is the first country in the world to implement a minimum age for buying energy drinks.
North Macedonia	14	Law on Trade, Article 24: retail sale of energy drinks prohibited to persons under 14; signage and age-verification duties specified. It became the first country to have the lowest age restriction for energy drinks.
Norway	16	In force since 1 January 2026. It is prohibited to sell energy drinks to persons under the age of 16. This applies to shops, canteens, vending machines, festivals and sporting events. When purchasing online, age must be checked before the item is delivered.
Poland	18	In force since 1 January 2024; prohibits sales to under-18s and in schools/vending machines.
Romania	18	National ban effective 15 March 2024.
Russia	18	Federal ban effective 1 September 2024 (age verification rules approved).
Turkey	18	National ban on sales to persons under 18; additional retail restrictions (schools, hospitals, etc.) apply under the communiqué. It became the second Middle Eastern country to implement an age restriction. Some reports say that this ban is not being properly enforced.
Uzbekistan	18	National ban on sales of energy drinks to minors since 2019; enforcement noted in official updates.

== Countries without a national age-of-sale law (examples) ==
Country	Minimum age (national law)	Notes
Australia	None	No national age limit; mandatory advisory statements "not suitable for young children" under the Food Standards Code.
Canada	None	No national age-of-sale law; federal limits and cautionary labels (up to 180 mg caffeine per serving) apply to caffeinated energy drinks.
Czech Republic	None (bill pending)	No current legal age-of-sale restriction. In November 2024, the Czech government endorsed a cross-party bill to ban the sale of energy drinks to persons under 15, with restrictions on vending machines, school premises, and advertising directed at children. The bill was still under parliamentary consideration as of early 2025.
Denmark	None; some retailers restrict to individuals under 16	No national legal age-of-sale restriction. The Danish Food Administration (Fødevarestyrelsen) advises against children consuming energy drinks. Lidl Denmark introduced a voluntary 16+ policy in 2018, and some independent retailers have adopted similar restrictions. No legislation has been introduced.
Estonia	None; retailers apply voluntary 16+ or 18+ limits	No national legal age-of-sale restriction. The Estonian Traders' Association proposed a voluntary 16+ sales restriction in 2016. Major retailers apply varying age limits (16+ or 18+) at the register, but enforcement is inconsistent and there is no statutory basis.
Finland	None; many retailers restrict to individuals under 15	No national legal age-of-sale restriction. The Finnish Institute for Health and Welfare (THL) recommends that energy drinks not be sold to persons under 15. Many individual shopkeepers, particularly in the K-Group and S-Group chains, apply a voluntary 15+ policy, though enforcement varies.
France	None	No national age-of-sale rule; EU high-caffeine warning label applies.
Germany	None	No nationwide legal age limit as of 2025; Länder ministers urged examining a 16+ rule, and some retailers apply voluntary under-16 policies (e.g., Rossmann, Lidl).
Italy	None	No national age-of-sale rule; EU labeling applies.
Netherlands	None; Aldi and Lidl restrict to individuals under 14	No national legal age-of-sale restriction. Since 2018, Aldi and Lidl Netherlands have applied a voluntary 14+ age limit with ID checks at the register. In 2019, a Foodwatch campaign prompted ten major supermarket chains (including Albert Heijn, Jumbo, and Coop) to declare openness to an 18+ limit, but only if applied uniformly across all retailers. No government legislation has followed.
Spain	None (ban for individuals under 16 or 18 announced in February 2026, not yet enacted) (18 in Galicia and 16 in Balearic Islands)	No national age-of-sale rule as of June 2026; EU labeling applies. In February 2026, the Ministry of Social Rights announced a ban on sales to those under 16 (and under 18 for drinks exceeding 32 mg caffeine per 100 mL), with public consultation underway. The autonomous community of Galicia enacted its own bans on consumption by minors in public spaces and on sales to minors; these became effective on March 2026.A ban in the Balearic Islands became effective by 12 August 2026.
Sweden	None; major retailers restrict to individuals under 15	No national legal age-of-sale restriction; an industry agreement (2009, revised 2022) recommends not selling energy drinks to persons under 15, widely applied by retailers. Reporting confirms there is no statutory age limit while many stores use a 15-year policy voluntarily.
United Kingdom	None (national law); major retailers restrict to individuals under 16 (ban announced to be set to 16 by April 2027 in England)	UK law has no nationwide sales age; labels must carry "High caffeine content. Not recommended for children…" for drinks >150 mg/L caffeine. In September 2025, the UK government launched a 12-week consultation proposing a legal ban on sales of high-caffeine energy drinks (>150 mg/L) to those under 16 in England, which would come into force by April 2027.
United States	None (federal law)	No federal minimum age of sale; some local jurisdictions restrict marketing/sales in limited venues (e.g., Suffolk County, NY, county parks).

== Labelling ==
Across the European Union and the United Kingdom, beverages (other than tea/coffee-based drinks) containing more than 150 mg/L of caffeine must bear the statement: "High caffeine content. Not recommended for children or pregnant or breast-feeding women", together with the caffeine amount per 100 mL, in the same field of vision as the product name.

== See also ==
- Legal drinking age
- Energy drink
- List of energy drinks
- Caffeine
- Public health law
- Food safety
