= Cabinet of Kuwait =

Chief executive body of Kuwait

The Cabinet of Kuwait is the chief executive body of the State of Kuwait. The 46th cabinet in the history of Kuwait was appointed on 12 May 2024. On 15 April 2024, Emir of Kuwait Sheikh Mishal Al-Ahmad Al-Jaber Al-Sabah assigned Sheikh Ahmad Abdullah Al-Ahmad as Prime Minister. The Emir has also assigned the Prime Minister to refer the cabinet line-up for their appointment. On 12 May 2024, the new cabinet line up was announced after the Emir approved in an Amiri order. On 15 May 2024, the newly formed gov't swore the constitutional oath before the Emir. On 25 August 2024, the Kuwaiti Emir signed a decree reshuffling cabinet. On 8 September 2024, an Amiri decree was issued accepting the resignation of the Deputy Prime Minister & Minister of Oil while issuing another decree appointing the Finance Minister as Acting Oil Minister. On 29 October 2024, an Amiri decree was issued appointing Minister of Education and Minister of Oil. On 11 November 2024, an Amiri decree was issued reassigning Dr. Mohammad Al-Wasmi as Minister of Awqaf (endowment) and Islamic Affairs. Nasser Al-Sumait is appointed as Minister of Justice. On 4 February 2025, an Amiri decree was issued amending the appointment of Sheikh Fahad Yusuf Saud Al-Sabah as First Deputy Prime Minister and Minister of Interior, and appointing Sheikh Abdullah Ali Abdullah Al-Salem Al-Sabah as Minister of Defense. On 10 March 2025, an Amiri decree was issued accepting the resignation of Minister for Electricity, Water and Renewable Energy and issuing a decree appointing Minister of Public Works as Acting Minister for Electricity, Water and Renewable Energy. On 24 March 2025, Dr. Sabeeh Al-Mukhaizeem is appointed Minister for Electricity, Water and Renewable Energy. On 4 August 2025, Finance Minister Nora Al-Fassam resigned and Dr. Sabeeh Al-Mukhaizeem is appointed as acting Finance Minister. On 1 February 2026, an Amiri decree was issued reshuffling the cabinet. On 2 February 2026, an Amiri decree was issued accepting the resignation of the Information Minister and appointing Omar Al-Omar as Acting Minister. On 14 September 2026, an Amiri decree was issued accepting the resignation of the Commerce Minister and appointing Abdulaziz Nasser Al-Marzouq as Acting Minister.

Incumbent	Office	Website	Since
Ahmad Al Abdullah Al Sabah	Prime Minister	pm.gov.kw	15 April 2024 – Present
Fahad Yusuf Al-Sabah	First Deputy Prime Minister and Minister of Interior	moi.gov.kw	12 May 2024 – Present
Shereeda Abdullah Al-Mousherji	Deputy Prime Minister and Minister of State for Cabinet Affairs	cmgs.gov.kw mona.gov.kw	12 May 2024 – Present
Abdulaziz Nasser Al-Marzouq (Acting)	Minister of Commerce and Industry	moci.gov.kw	14 September 2026 – Present
Abdullah Ali Abdullah Al-Salem Al-Sabah	Minister of Defense	mod.gov.kw	4 February 2025 – Present
Jalal Sayed Abdulmuhsin Al-Tabtabei	Minister of Education	moe.edu.kw	29 October 2024 – Present
Sabeeh Al-Mukhaizeem	Minister of Electricity, Water and Renewable Energy	mew.gov.kw	24 March 2025 – Present
Yakoub Al-Sayed Yousef Al-Refaei	Minister of Finance	mof.gov.kw	1 February 2026 – Present
Jarrah Jaber Al-Ahmad Al-Sabah	Minister of Foreign Affairs	mofa.gov.kw	1 February 2026 – Present
Ahmad Abdulwahab Al-Awadhi	Minister of Health	moh.gov.kw	12 May 2024 – Present
Nader Abdullah Mohammad Al-Jallal	Minister of Higher Education and Scientific Research	mohe.edu.kw	25 August 2024 – Present
Omar Saud Abdulaziz Al-Omar (Acting)	Minister of Information and Culture	media.gov.kw	2 February 2026 – Present
Mohammad Ibrahim Al-Wasmi	Ministry of Awqaf and Islamic Affairs	awqaf.gov.kw	12 May 2024 – Present
Nasser Yousef Al-Sumait	Minister of Justice	moj.gov.kw	11 November 2024 – Present
Tareq Sulieman Ahmad Al-Roumi	Minister of Oil	moo.gov.kw	29 October 2024 – Present
Nora Mohammad Al-Mashaan	Minister of Public Works	mpw.gov.kw	12 May 2024 – Present
Amthal Hadi Al-Huwailah	Minister of Social Affairs, Family and Childhood Affairs	mosa.gov.kw	12 May 2024 – Present
Omar Saud Abdulaziz Al-Omar	Minister of State for Communication and Information Technology	moc.gov.kw	12 May 2024 – Present
Reem Ghazi Al-Fulaij	Minister of State for Development and Sustainability Affairs		1 February 2026 – Present
Abdulaziz Nasser Al-Marzouq	Minister of State for Economic and Investment Affairs		1 February 2026 – Present
Abdullatif Hamed Hamad Al-Meshari	Minister of State for Municipal Affairs and Minister of State for Housing Affairs	baladia.gov.kw pahw.gov.kw	25 August 2024 – Present
Tareq Hamad Al-Jalahma	Minister of State for Youth and Sport Affairs	youth.gov.kw	1 February 2026 – Present
