= Mohammed Abu Zaid =

Egyptian poet and novelist

- محمد أبو زيد
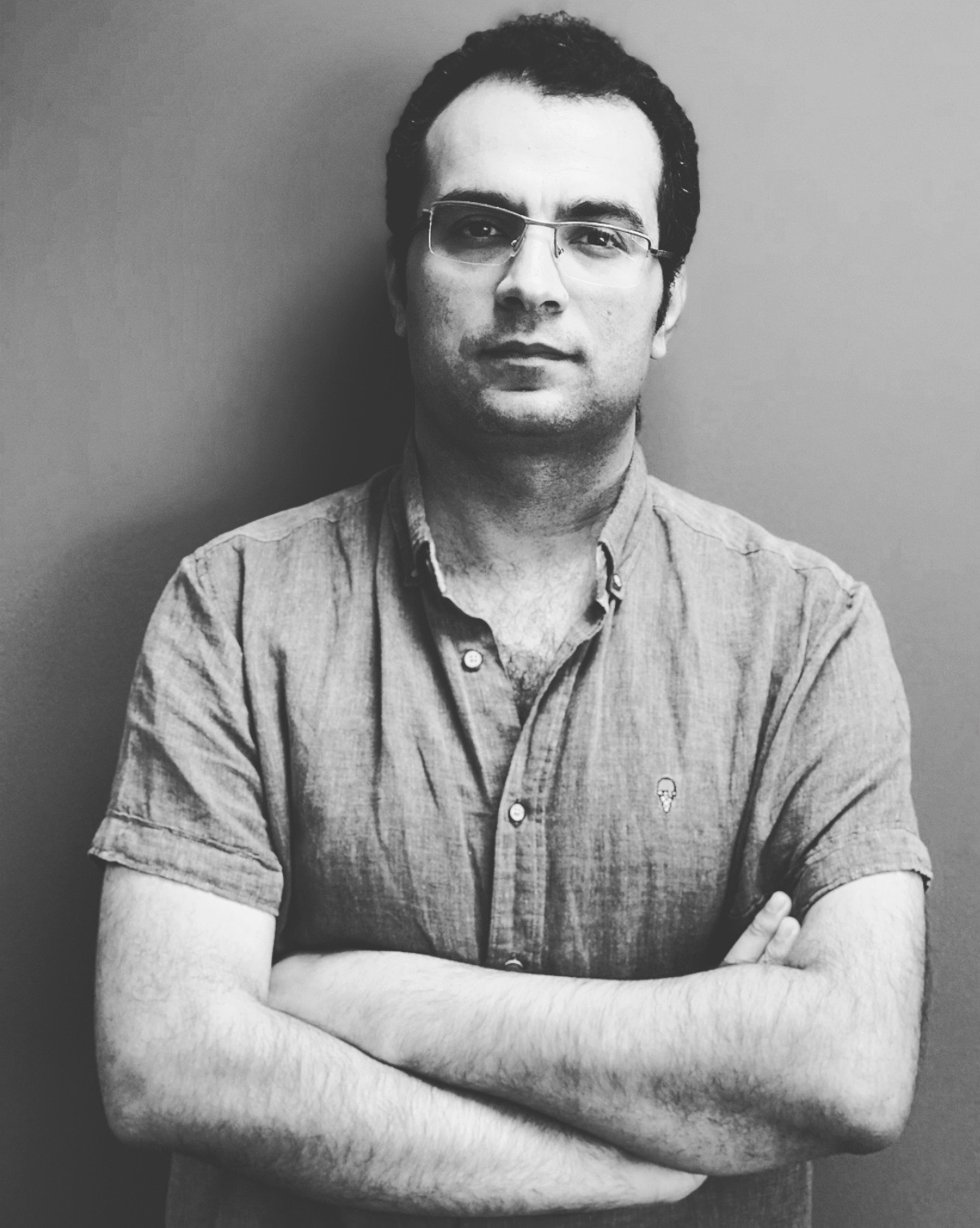
- Born: 4 May 1980 (age 46); Sohag, Egypt
- Education: Bachelor in Commerce, Al-Azhar University
- Title: Poet

Mohammed Abu Zaid (Arabic: محمد أبو زيد) (born 4 May 1980), is an Egyptian poet and a novelist. He was born in Sohag Governorate in Upper Egypt. He published his first collection "A Hole in the Air as Tall as My Height" (original text: "thqab fi alhawa'") in 2003, published by the General Authority for Cultural Palaces. Then he published a number of collections such as “Praise The Forest " (original text: "mdih alghaba") published by the authority of the Egyptian General Book Authority, "People Sitting Around the Water " (original text: qawm juluws hawlahum maa'a")," "Mdihamtan", and "A Plague Putting One Leg Over the Other, Looking at the Sky" (original text: taeun yadae saqaan fawq al'ukhraa wayan'dur lilsama). He also published a novel entitled "The Impact of the Prophet" (original text: 'athar alnabi) published by Dar Sharqiyat, and a children's book entitled "Maryam's Mint" (original text: "neinaeat mariam") published by the book Qatar Al-Nada, and a book on the art of writing entitled "The Rabbit Out of the Hat" (original text: al'arnab kharij alqubea) published by the Hindawi Foundation for Education and Culture. He also participated in a number of poetry conferences in Egypt and around the world.

== Works ==
1. A Hole in the Air as Tall as My Height" (original text: "thqab fi alhawa'"), Creations Series, The Public Authority for Cultural Palaces, 2003
2. "Maryam's Mint" (original text: "neinaeat mariam"), Poetry for Children, Qatar Al-Nada Book, The General Authority for Cultural Palaces, 2005
3. People Sitting Around the Water " (original text: qawm juluws hawlahum maa'a"), poetry, Dar Sharqiyyat, 2006
4. “Praise The Forest " (original text: "mdih alghaba"), Poetry, The Egyptian General Book Authority, 2007
5. "A Plague Putting One Leg Over the Other, Looking at the Sky" (original text: taeun yadae saqaan fawq al'ukhraa wayan'dur lilsama'), poetry, Dar Sharqiyat, 2008
6. "The Impact of the Prophet" (original text: 'athar alnabi), a novel, Dar Sharqiyat, 2010
7. "Mdihamtan", poetry, Sharqiyat House, 2011
8. "Introduction to Absence" (original text: muqadima fi alghiab), Poetry, Dar Sharqiyat, 2013
9. "A Ruining Poem" (original text: qasidat alkharab), an anthology of poetry, Dar Al-Manar, France, 2014
10. "Black and Beautiful" (original text: sawda' wajamila), Poetry, Oriental House, 2015
11. "The Rabbit Out of the Hat" (original text: al'arnab kharij alqubea), Articles, The Hendawi Foundation, 2016
12. "A Spider in the Heart" (original text: einkabut fi alqulb), Novel, Egyptian General Book Authority, 2019
13. "Hell" (original text: jahim), Poetry, Rawafed House, 2019

== Awards ==
1. Souad al-Sabah Prize in Poetry for his collection "It Seems that I Have Really Died" (original text: "ybidu 'anani qad mitu fielan") 2005
2. Yahya Haqqi Prize at the Supreme Council of Culture, for the novel "A Long Path that Fits for Three Funerals" (original text: "mmar tawil yuslih lithalath jinazat mutajawarata"), 2003
3. His novel "A Spider in the Heart" (original text: einkabut fi alqulb) was nominated for the Sheikh Zayed Book Award- Young Author Branch, 2019

== Writing Site ==
Mohammed Abu Zaid established the cultural writing site in early 2007 as the first Egyptian cultural site to publish story, poetry and criticism. It is interested in cinema and plastic arts, to give an opportunity for the new generations who might find difficulties to publish. Over the past 12 years, the site has been able to prove that it is the voice of all literary works.

== Reception ==
The Iraqi poet Basem Al-Marabi said about his poetry collection "Introduction to Absence": "This poetry collection takes you to the future because of the reasons presented. Moreover, it is also loyal to its world and to human concerns as a first reference."

The poet Bahaa Jaheen said about his poetry "Mdihamtan". A poet that can sometimes be described as a surrealist, but because he is a great poet, except that he is certainly modernist, in the broadest sense of the word. He is not a scholar in his poetry, whatever the school, but rather deviates from the traditions and norms and is covered in art all the time."

The critic Yusri Abdullah said about his book, A Plague Putting One Leg Over the Other, Looking at the Sky" (original text: taeun yadae saqaan fawq al'ukhraa wayan'dur lilsama') The poet Mohammed Abu Zaid does not only break the horizon of expectation of the recipient by removing the claimed sanctity of the language, but also comes into contact with worlds and current cultural contexts (the Internet). He also interacts with the various visual arts, specifically cinema. He is aware of the mechanisms of building his poem, mocking the world around him. However, it is the irony that is haunted by bitterness and poetry at the same time. ”
