= Sheikha Rima al-Sabah =

Lebanese-Kuwaiti journalist and philanthropist

Sheikha Rima al-Sabah (Arabic: ريما الصباح; born 1962) is a Lebanese-Kuwaiti former journalist, and a current UNHCR Goodwill Ambassador.

She is married to the former Minister of Foreign Affairs of Kuwait Salem Abdullah Al-Jaber Al-Sabah.

== Early life and education ==
Al-Sabah was born in Lebanon in 1962.

== Adult life ==
Al-Sabah worked as a war correspondent for United Press International. A few weeks before the September 11th attacks, she moved to USA with her husband, who served as ambassador of Kuwait to USA from June 2001 until May 2022.

She became a UNHCR Goodwill Ambassador in January 2015 She is the founder and the chair of Kuwait-America Foundation’s annual gala and noted for her socialising with presidents Clinton, Trump, and Biden.

== Family life ==
Al-Sabah is married to Salem Abdullah Al-Jaber Al-Sabah whom she met in 1983 when both were students in Beirut. They married in 1988 and have four sons.
