= Nouriya Al-Subaih =

Nouriya Al-Subaih is a former education minister of Kuwait. In January 2008, she survived a no-confidence vote by MPs. After the 2009 general election, she was replaced as education minister by Moudhi Humoud.
