= Abdul Rahman Al-Awadi =

Kuwaiti doctor and public health official

Minister of Planning
- In office 1983 – 1990

Minister of Health
- In office 1975 – 1988
- Preceded by: Abdul Razzaq Mishary Al-Adwani
- Succeeded by: Abdul-Razzaq Yusuf Al-Abd Al-Razzaq

Member of the National Assembly
- In office 1975 – 1980

Personal details
- Born: 18 December 1936 (age 89)
- Died: July 6, 2019 (aged 82)
- Education: American University of Beirut (BA); Harvard T.H. Chan School of Public Health (MPH); University of Aberdeen School of Medicine and Dentistry (MD)

Abdul Rahman Al-Awadi (December 18, 1936 – July 6, 2019) was a Kuwaiti doctor, politician and government minister. He was the Minister of Health from 1975 to 1988 and the Minister of Planning from 1983 to 1990.
