= Abdullah Mubarak Al-Sabah =

Kuwaiti royal

Abdullah Al-Mubarak Al Sabah عبدالله المبارك الصباح
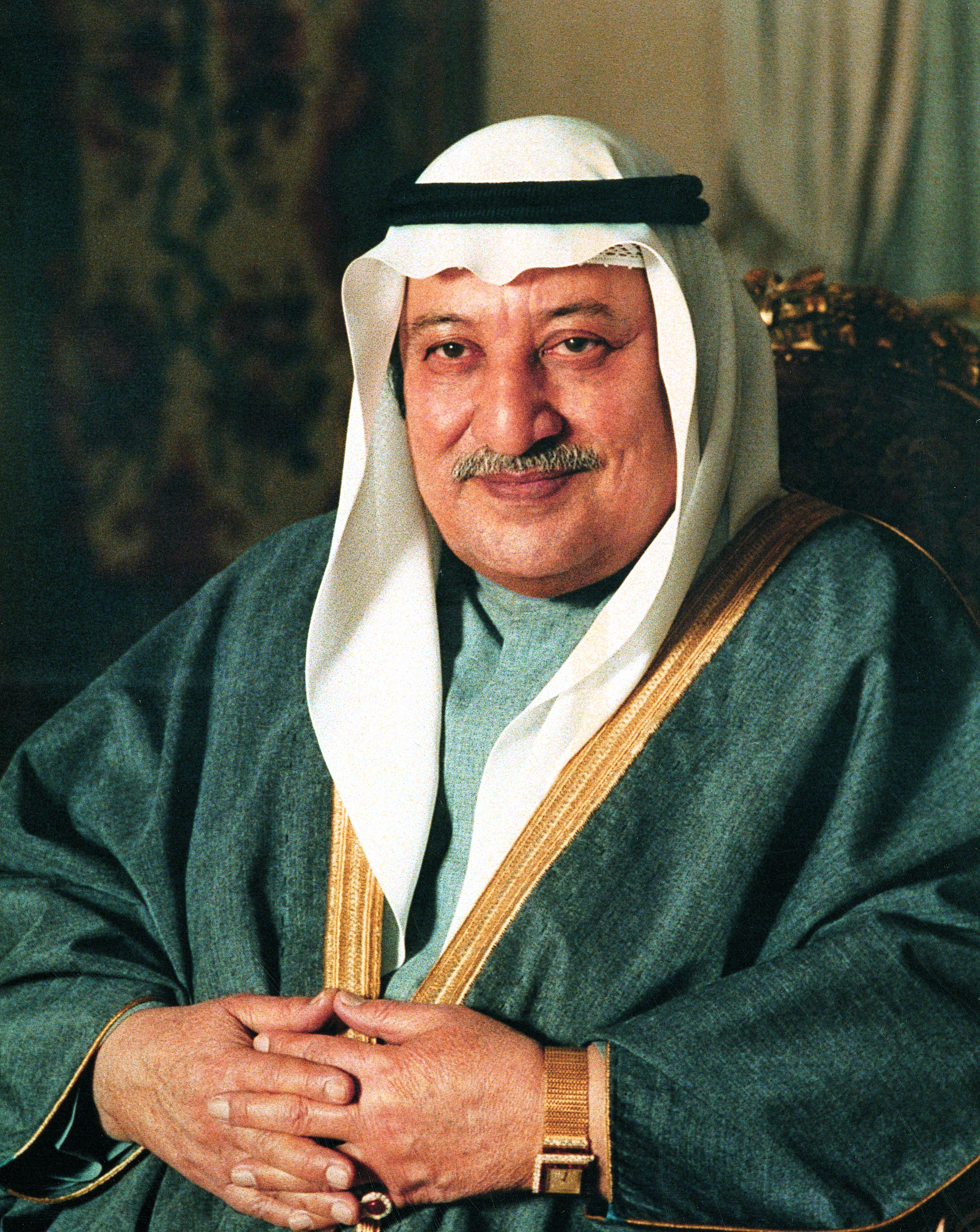
- Born: 23 August 1914
- Died: 15 June 1991 (aged 76); London, UK
- Spouse: Souad Mohammed Al-Sabah
- Issue: Mubarak (b. 1961); Mohammed (b. 1971); Omariya (b. 1972); Mubarak (b. 1976); Shaima (b. 1980)
- House: Sabah
- Father: Mubarak Al-Sabah

Sheikh Abdullah Al-Mubarak Al-Sabah (Arabic: الشيخ عبدالله المبارك الصباح; 23 August 1914 – 15 June 1991) was the youngest son of the founder of the modern state of Kuwait Sheikh Mubarak Al-Kabir (“Mubarak the Great”).

== Career ==
In 1926, Abdullah Al-Mubarak commenced his duty in the field of public service at an early age, when he was assigned to ensure security of one of the gates of the wall of Kuwait. He succeeded in the execution of the assignment in an impressive manner. From 1940 to 1946, Abdullah Al-Mubarak supported institutional work in Kuwait in several sectors. During 1942, he assumed the presidency of the General Security Department and became Governor of Kuwait City. In 1945, he headed a special court to settle disputes, quarrels and thefts, and the task of achieving security in Kuwait. The court was located in the Safat area. Additionally, the UK asserted that the Security Department handles all security work within Kuwait City, under the administration of the court headed by Abdullah Al-Mubarak. He was also awarded the Order of the Indian Empire from the British government as a companion CIE, in appreciation of his efforts during the Second World War. By 1948, Abdullah Al-Mubarak assumed responsibility for starting the Kuwaiti Defense Forces, and established an administration that handles passport and nationality affairs upon the request of the Emir of Kuwait, Ahmed Al-Jaber. During 1949, he envisioned building the Kuwait Army, and he laid the foundation of its mission and goals. From 1950 to 1960, he was Deputy Ruler of Kuwait and acted as the de facto ruler on a frequent and consecutive basis, from three months to eleven months in the last three years during this period, most of which were under his rule, due to the illness of Abdullah Al-Salem and his travel outside Kuwait. in 1951, Abdullah Al-Mubarak headed Kuwait Radio with the launch of its broadcast for the first time from the police and public security building, where he continued until 1960 as its president. In 1952, he announced in an interview with the “BBC” that a desalination plant in Kuwait will be operated and water pipelines will be extended to Kuwaiti homes for the first time, as the drinking water crisis in Kuwait ended. By 1953, he created the Aviation Club and appointed his English coach, Captain Lash, and inaugurated the Club and Flight School in the same year. During 1954, he escaped a serious accident after his car was destroyed as a result of his pursuit of a number of smugglers. He was also appointed as Commander-in-Chief of the army. By 1957, an Emiri Decree merged the “Security Forces” and “Border Forces” under the chairmanship of Abdullah Al-Mubarak. In 1959, Abdullah Al-Salem issued a decree merging the police and public security into a single department headed by Abdullah Al-Mubarak. In 1960, he received the Grand Sash of the Lebanese Order of Merit. By 1961, Abdullah had resigned from all political posts, and in 1973, his son, Mubarak, died, and was buried in Egypt.

He died 15 June 1991 in London and he was buried in the Sulaibikhat Cemetery in Kuwait the next day.

== Personal life ==
Sheikh Abdullah Al-Mubarak married Sheikha Dr. Souad Mohammed Al-Sabah in 1960.

== Honours and awards ==
He received the Syrian Medal of Merit by Syrian President Adib Al-Shishkli in 1952. In 1960, he was awarded the Grand Sash of the Lebanese Order of Merit from President of the Republic, Fouad Shehab.
