= Abdullah Al-Taweel =

Kuwaiti politician (1944–2024)

- عبد الله الطويل

Minister of Health
- In office 2007–2008
- Preceded by: Abdullah Saud Al-Muhailbi
- Succeeded by: Ali Al-Barrak

Personal details
- Born: 1944 Kuwait City, Kuwait
- Died: 21 October 2024 (aged 79–80)
- Party: Independent

Abdullah Al-Taweel (Arabic: عبد الله الطويل; 1944 – 21 October 2024) was a Kuwaiti politician. An independent, he served as Minister of Health from 2007 to 2008.

Al-Taweel died on 21 October 2024.
