= Mubarak Abdullah Al-Mubarak Al-Sabah =

Kuwaiti entrepreneur

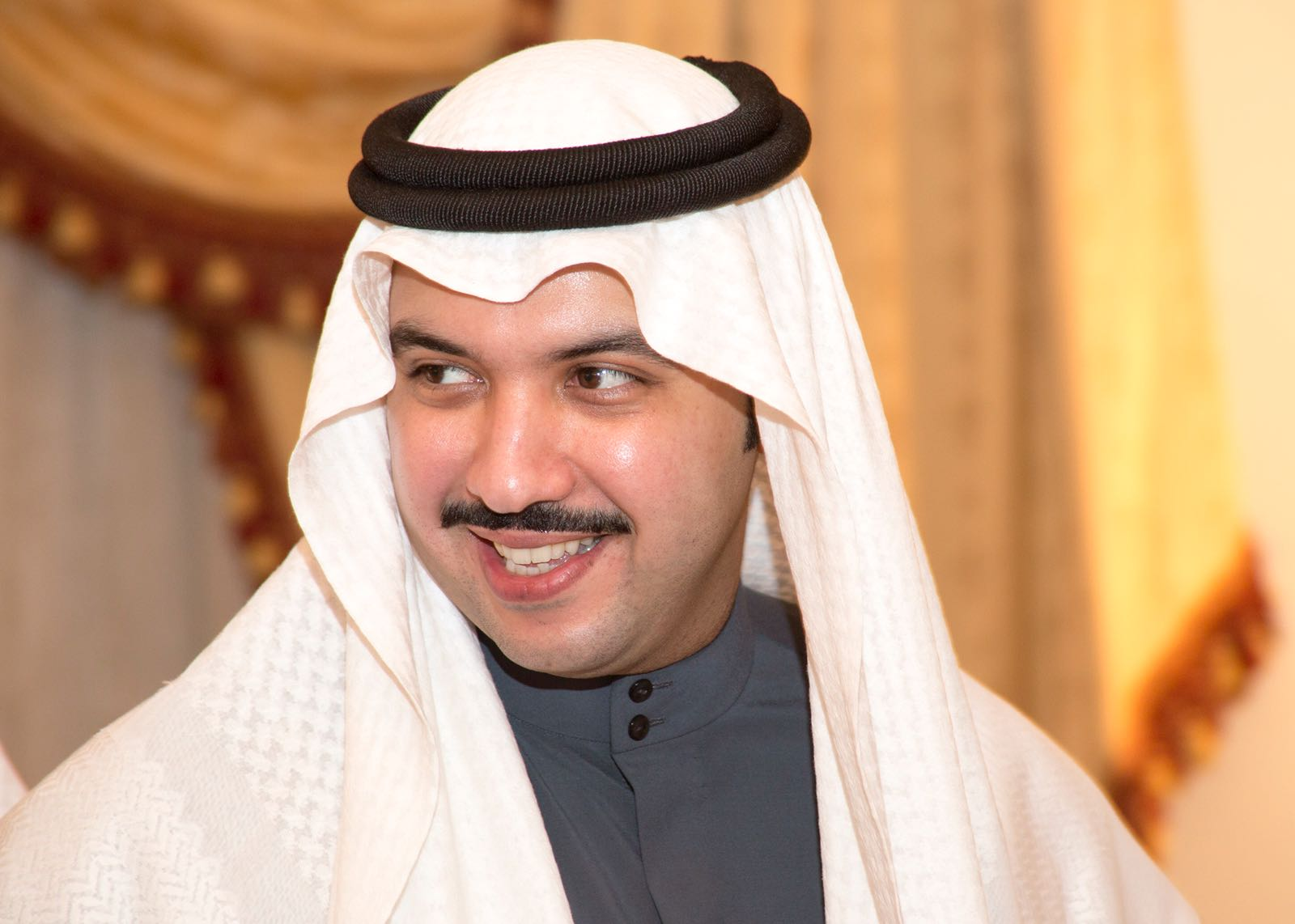
- House: Sabah
- Father: Abdullah Mubarak Al-Sabah
- Mother: Souad Al-Sabah
- Education: University of Buckingham; University of Cambridge
- Military career
- Allegiance: Kuwait
- Branch: Army

Sheikh Mubarak Abdullah Al-Mubarak Al-Sabah is a Kuwaiti entrepreneur and a notable member of the House of Sabah, the ruling family of Kuwait. He is the founder and chairman of Action Hotels, Action Real Estate and Action Hotels, as well as vice-chairman of their parent family holding company Action Group Holdings. Mubarak was also previously the founding chairman of the Qurain Petrochemical Industries Company until its merger in 2022 with the Kuwait Projects Company (Holding).

== Early life and education ==
Mubarak Abdullah Al-Mubarak Al-Sabah is the son of Souad Al-Sabah, an economist, writer and poet, and Abdullah Mubarak Al-Sabah, the Deputy Emir of Kuwait in the 1950s and the youngest son of Mubarak Al-Sabah.

Mubarak graduated from the Royal Military Academy Sandhurst. He subsequently joined the Kuwait Military Forces where he served as an Armoured Officer. Mubarak later graduated from the University of Buckingham with an undergraduate degree in Politics with Economics. He continued his studies in International Relations, graduating with a Master’s Degree from University of Cambridge.

== Career ==
Mubarak was also the founding chairman of the Qurain Petrochemical Industries Company, a company founded by Amiri Decree in 2004. Following the announcement, in March 2022, of a merger between Qurain and the Kuwait Projects Company (Holding), Mubarak resigned from his position as chairman of Qurain.

In 2006, Mubarak founded Action Hotels which opened its first hotel in Melbourne, Australia. The mid-market hotel company was publicly listed on the Alternative Investment Market in December 2013 with a valuation of £102 million. By the following year, the company owned half a dozen hotels in the Middle East and Australia, with nine additional hotels under construction. As of 2016, most of properties owned by Action Hotels was operated by Ibis under its Ibis Styles and Ibis Budget brands. Mubarak serves as chairman of Action Hotels and holds a majority stake in the company. He is also founder and chairman of Action Real Estate, and vice-chairman of Action Group Holdings, the parent family holding company of both Action Hotels and Action Real Estate.

In March 2017, Christian Nakhla, the French ambassador to Kuwait, conferred Mubarak as a Knight of the Legion of Honor.
