= Mohammad Abdullah Al-Mubarak Al-Sabah =

Kuwaiti politician

- الشيخ محمد عبدالله المبارك الصباح
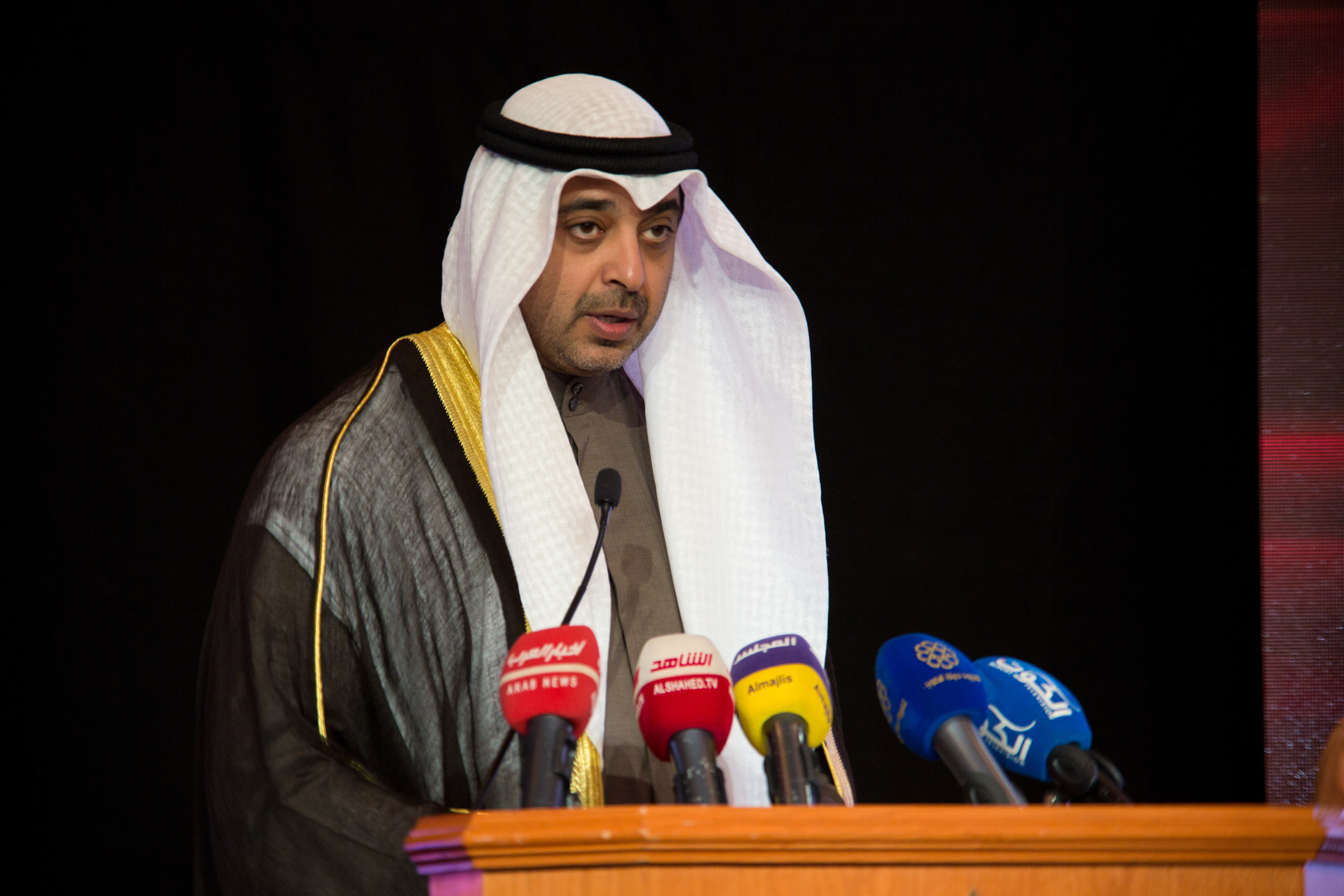

Minister of State for Amiri Diwan Affairs
- Incumbent
- Assumed office 11 August 2021
- Monarchs: Nawaf Al-Ahmad Al-Jaber; Mishal Al-Ahmad Al-Jaber

Deputy Minister of State for Amiri Diwan Affairs
- In office 20 December 2017 – 11 August 2021
- Monarchs: Sabah Al-Ahmad Al-Jaber; Nawaf Al-Ahmad Al-Jaber

Minister of Information
- In office 14 February 2012 – 11 March 2012
- Monarch: Sabah Al-Ahmad Al-Jaber
- Prime Minister: Jaber Al-Mubarak

Personal details
- Parent(s): Abdullah Mubarak Al-Sabah (father); Souad Al-Sabah (mother)

Sheikh Mohammed Abdullah Al-Mubarak Al-Sabah (Arabic: الشيخ محمد عبدالله المبارك الصباح; October 2, 1971) is a Kuwaiti politician who has held several ministerial roles, including Minister of Information, Minister of Health, and Minister of State for Amiri Diwan Affairs since August 11, 2021. He is the second son of Sheikh Abdullah Al-Mubarak Al-Sabah, following his older brother Mubarak who died young. His mother is Sheikha Dr. Suad Mohammad Al-Sabah, and he is the direct grandson of the founder of modern Kuwait, Sheikh Mubarak Al-Sabah.

== Background and education ==
Sheikh Mohammed Abdullah Al-Mubarak Al-Sabah was born on October 2, 1971, in Cairo. He received his early education at the Modern English School in Kuwait from 1979 to 1986, before moving to Geneva where he attended Collège du Léman, graduating with a high school diploma in 1988. He then studied at Eton College in the United Kingdom until 1990, when he enrolled at the University of Oxford. In the same year, he worked as a communications officer with the British Army during the Second Gulf War. In 1995, he earned a bachelor's degree in political science from the University of Nottingham, UK, and in 1996, he obtained a master's degree in International Studies and Diplomacy from the University of London.

== Career ==
In 1997, Sheikh Mohammed Abdullah Al-Mubarak Al-Sabah began his career as a researcher in the Secretariat of Ministerial Committees at the Cabinet Council. He was promoted in 2000 to Assistant Undersecretary at the Information and Research Affairs Center of the Ministry of Cabinet Affairs. In 2002, he was appointed as the Head of the Citizens' Service Agency, and in 2007, he became the Head of the Government Performance Monitoring and Evaluation Agency. On February 14, 2012, he was appointed as the Minister of Information. On July 19, 2012, he was named both Minister of Information and State Minister for Cabinet Affairs, serving in these roles until December 11, 2012, when he became the State Minister for Cabinet Affairs and State Minister for Municipal Affairs. Subsequently, on August 4, 2013, he was appointed as the State Minister for Cabinet Affairs and Minister of Health. He was removed from his position as Minister of Health on June 1, 2014, but retained his role as State Minister for Cabinet Affairs.

On December 20, 2017, he was appointed as the Deputy Minister for Amiri Diwan Affairs with the rank of minister, and on August 11, 2021, a decree was issued appointing him as the Minister for Amiri Diwan Affairs.
