= Dawood Marafie =

Kuwaiti politician (born 1982)

Dawood Sulaiman Marafie

Member of the National Assembly
- In office 2023–2024

Minister of State for National Assembly Affairs
- In office January 2024 – April 2024

Personal details
- Born: 1982 (age 43–44)
- Occupation: Politician

Dawood Sulaiman Marafie (born 1982) is a Kuwaiti politician and businessman. He was elected as a member of the National Assembly of Kuwait in the 2023 general election representing the First Constituency. In January 2024, he was appointed Minister of State for National Assembly Affairs, Minister of State for Youth Affairs, and Minister of State for Communications in the 45th Cabinet of Kuwait.

== Political career ==
=== Member of Parliament ===
Marafie was elected to the National Assembly during the 2023 Kuwaiti general election, securing 3,434 votes in the First Constituency.

He initially submitted his candidacy for the position of Speaker in the opening session of the 17th legislative term on 20 June 2023, but later withdrew in favor of Ahmed Al-Sadoun.

He served on several parliamentary committees, including:

- Financial and Economic Affairs Committee
- Public Utilities Committee
- Education and Culture Committee
- Budgets Committee

=== Ministerial positions ===
On 17 January 2024, Marafie was appointed to the 45th Cabinet of Kuwait, holding the following positions:

- Minister of State for National Assembly Affairs
- Minister of State for Youth Affairs
- Minister of State for Communications

He served until 7 April 2024, when the cabinet resigned and transitioned to a caretaker government.

== Background ==
Before entering politics, Marafie worked in the banking sector and global stock markets. He holds a Master's degree in Business Administration.
