= Hussein Nasser Al-Huraiti =

Kuwaiti politician (born 1962)

- Born: 1962 (age 63–64)
- Occupation: Member of the National Assembly of Kuwait

Hussein Nasser Al-Huraiti (Arabic: حسين الحريتي) was a member of the Kuwaiti National Assembly, representing the first district. Born in 1962, Al-Huraiti worked as a judge, a lawyer, and a professor before being elected to the National Assembly in 2006. Al-Huraiti is an Independent deputy who is on good terms with the Al-Sabah royal family.

== Minister of Justice and Islamic Affairs ==
Al-Huraiti is also the Minister of Justice and Islamic Affairs, the only elected MP in the cabinet. Kuwaiti law requires the government to include at least one elected lawmaker.

== Human Trafficking Law ==
On September 30, 2008, Al-Huraiti submitted a new law on human trafficking to the Cabinet. On September 23, the Supreme Committee for Human Rights had held a meeting to adopt effective measures to avoid riots.

== Supported Education Minister Nouriya Al-Sabeeh during no-confidence vote ==
On January 19, 2008, Al-Huraiti told the Kuwait Times that he had met with Education Minister Nouriya Al-Sabeeh and heard from her replies to a number of questions related to the grilling and he was satisfied with her answers. The lawmaker also said that Sabeeh needed more time to execute her promised reforms. Al-Huraiti had previously been widely expected to back the no-confidence vote. He is one of seven MPs from the Awazem, the largest tribe in the country, whose other six MPs have already declared they would vote against the minister. MP Saad Al-Shurai Al-Azemi, who grilled the minister, belongs to the tribe.
