= Ahmad Nasser Al-Mohammad Al-Sabah =

Kuwaiti politician

- الشيخ أحمد ناصر المحمد الصباح
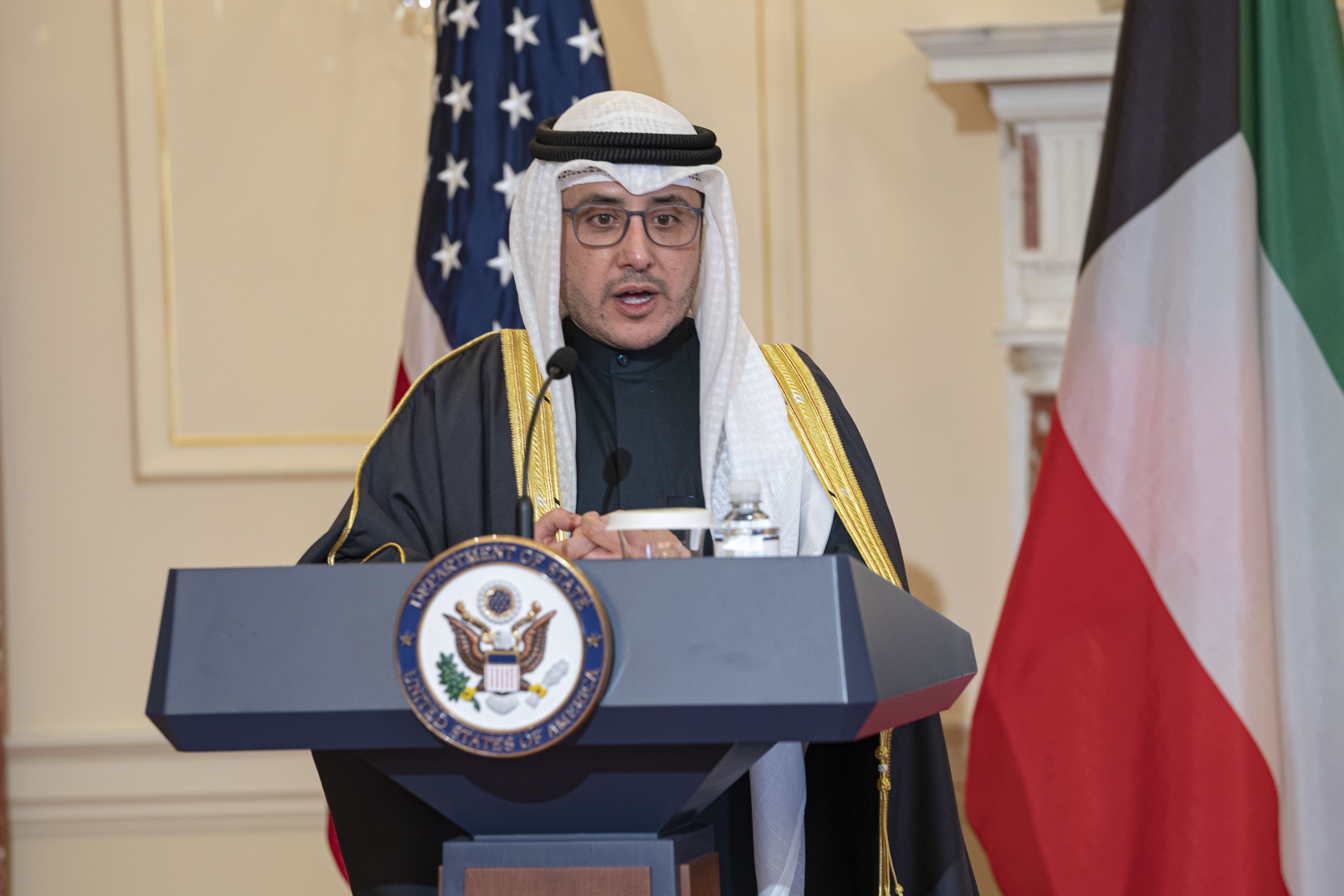
- Ahmad in 2022

5th Minister of Foreign Affairs
- In office 17 December 2019 – 2 October 2022
- Monarchs: Sabah Al-Ahmad Al-Jaber; Nawaf Al-Ahmad Al-Jaber
- Preceded by: Sabah Al-Khalid Al-Sabah
- Succeeded by: Salem Abdullah Al-Jaber Al-Sabah

Personal details
- Born: 13 February 1971 (age 55) Kuwait City, Kuwait
- Parent: Nasser Al-Mohammed Al-Sabah (father)
- Relatives: House of Sabah
- Education: University of Bordeaux; University of Franche-Comté; University of Strasbourg; Paris 1 Panthéon-Sorbonne University

Sheikh Ahmad Nasser Al-Mohammad Al-Sabah (Arabic: أحمد ناصر المحمد الصباح, romanized: ash-Shaykh ʾAḥmad Nāṣir al-Muḥammad aṣ-Ṣabāḥ; born 13 February 1971) is a member of the Kuwaiti royal family who served as Minister of Foreign Affairs from 2019 to 2022.

== Early life and education ==
A member of the ruling House of Sabah, Ahmad was born on 13 February 1971 to former Kuwaiti Prime Minister Nasser Al-Mohammed Al-Sabah.

He attended Kaifan High School in Kuwait, graduating in 1987. During the 1990s, Ahmad attended a number of French-language schools. In 1990, he completed an associate's degree in political science from the University of Bordeaux, followed by two bachelor's degrees in international relations and foreign languages from the University of Strasbourg in 1994. He then earned a master's degree from the University of Strasbourg in 1995 and a PhD in political science from Paris 1 Panthéon-Sorbonne University in 2000.

Ahmad took a break during his studies from 1990 to 1991 to volunteer in the office of the Foreign Minister of the Kuwaiti government-in-exile during the Iraqi invasion of Kuwait.

== Career ==
After completing his education, Ahmad was appointed to various posts at the Foreign Ministry of Kuwait. By 2016, he was an Assistant Foreign Minister.

On 17 December 2019, Ahmad was appointed Foreign Minister in a cabinet shake-up under Prime Minister Sabah Al-Khalid Al-Sabah. In February 2022, Ahmad was accused by members of the Kuwait National Assembly (KNA) of corruption and administrative and policy improprieties, along with Defense Minister Hamad Jaber Al-Ali Al-Salim Al Sabah. On 16 February, Ahmad survived a no-confidence vote in the KNA; however, Hamad resigned the next day. Ahmad was appointed caretaker defense minister.

Ahmad left the foreign minister position on 2 October 2022, when the government resigned following gains by opposition candidates in the 2022 Kuwaiti general election.

== Honors ==
- France: Legion of Honour (2019), awarded by Marie Masdupuy, French Ambassador to Kuwait
