= Abdullah Ali Al-Yahya =

Kuwaiti politician

- عبداللّه علي اليحيا
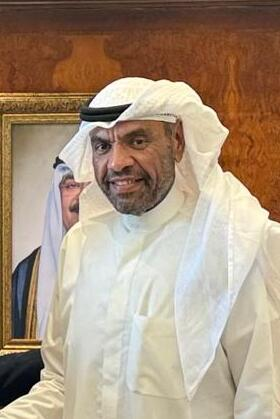
- Al-Yahya in 2024

Minister of Foreign Affairs
- In office 12 May 2024 – 1 February 2026
- Preceded by: Salem Al-Abdullah Al-Jaber
- Succeeded by: Jarrah Jaber Al-Ahmad Al-Sabah

Personal details
- Born: 13 June 1966 (age 60) Kuwait City
- Party: Independent

Abdullah Ali Al-Yahya (born 13 June 1966) is a Kuwaiti diplomat who held the position of Minister of Foreign Affairs from 12 May 2024 until 1 February 2026. Al-Yahya was first non-royal foreign minister in Kuwait’s history. He previously held the role as the Kuwaiti ambassador to Argentina.
