= Souad Al-Sabah =

Souad Mohammed Al-Sabah
- سعاد محمد الصباح

Personal details
- Born: 22 May 1942 (age 84) Az Zubayr, Iraq
- Spouse: Abdullah Mubarak Al-Sabah (m. 1960; died 1991)
- Children: Mubarak (1961–1973); Mohammed (1971); Omniya (1972); Mubarak (1976); Shaima (1980)
- Education: University of Surrey, UK
- Website: http://www.souadalsabah.com

Souad Mohammad Sabah Al-Mohammad Al-Sabah (Arabic: سعاد الصباح, romanized: Suʾād aṣ-Ṣabāḥ; born 22 May 1942) is a Kuwaiti economist, writer and poet. She is also recognized as the widow of Abdullah Mubarak Al-Sabah, the youngest son of Mubarak Al-Sabah, credited with founding modern Kuwait.

== Early life ==
She received her primary education in Basra and then in Kuwait at Al-Khansa School, and her secondary education in Al-Merqab School.

She obtained a degree in economics and politics at Cairo University in 1973 and a doctorate in economics from University of Surrey in the United Kingdom in 1981.

== Career ==
She followed the path of feminist creativity that sometimes belongs to Romanticism and some times belongs to Apollo School. Founded in 1985, Dar Souad Al-Sabah Publishing and Distribution reprinted the volumes of Al-Risala Al-Adabiya, between 1933 and 1952.

=== Abdullah Al-Mubarak Al-Sabah Prize ===
She participated in the Supreme Committee for the Liberation of Kuwait during the period of the Iraqi invasion of Kuwait in 1990 through the mobilization of Arab organizations to resist that aggression. Souad Al-Sabah is a member of the executive committee of the Worlds Muslim Women Organisation for South East Asia, and is on the board of trustees and executive committee of the Arab Intellect Forum.

== Reception ==
This research is an attempt to take another path in critical study, and it embodies the duality of the subject and the object, and their dialectical relationship that appears with other dualities. These contrasts such as life and death, man and women, treachery and loyalty, abstract and concrete, subject and object are reflected in her poetry.

== Personal life ==
On 15 September 1960, she married Sheikh Abdullah Mubarak Al-Sabah.

== See also ==
- Feminist economics
- List of feminist economists
