= Jarrah Jaber Al-Ahmad Al-Sabah =

Kuwaiti politician

- جراح جابر الأحمد الصباح
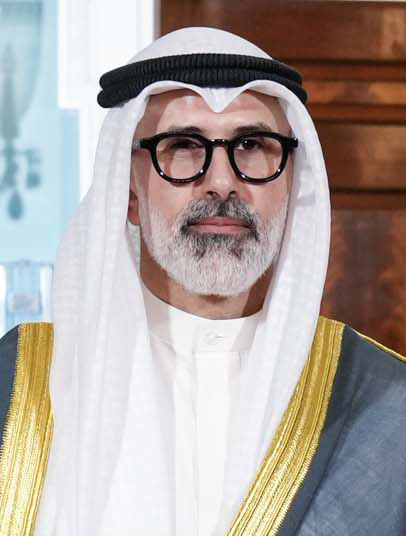
- Al-Sabah in 2026

Minister of Foreign Affairs
- Incumbent
- Assumed office 1 February 2026
- Preceded by: Abdullah Ali Al-Yahya

Personal details
- Born: 9 April 1980 (age 46)
- Relations: House of Sabah
- Parent: Jaber III (father)
- Education: University of Delaware

Jarrah Jaber Al-Ahmad Al-Sabah (Arabic: جراح جابر الأحمد الصباح; born 9 April 1980) is a Kuwaiti politician who has served as Minister for Foreign Affairs since 2026.

== Biography ==
Al-Sabah was born as a son of Jaber III, from 1977 to 2006 Emir of Kuwait.

In 2004 he received a BA in Economics from the University of Delaware. Since 2005 he has worked in the Ministry of Foreign Affairs. There he was a diplomatic attache from 2005 until 2008. From 2008 to 2021 he was a Secretary in the Ministry. From 2021 to 2023 he worked as a Counselor in the Ministry. In 2023 he was appointed Ambassador and Deputy Minister of Foreign Affairs.

In 2026, he was appointed to the Cabinet of Kuwait by his uncle, the Emir of Kuwait Sheikh Mishal Al-Ahmad Al-Jaber Al-Sabah.

== Personal life ==
He is married and has three children.
