= Moudi A. Al-Humoud =

Professor of Management

Prof. Moudi A. Al-Humoud
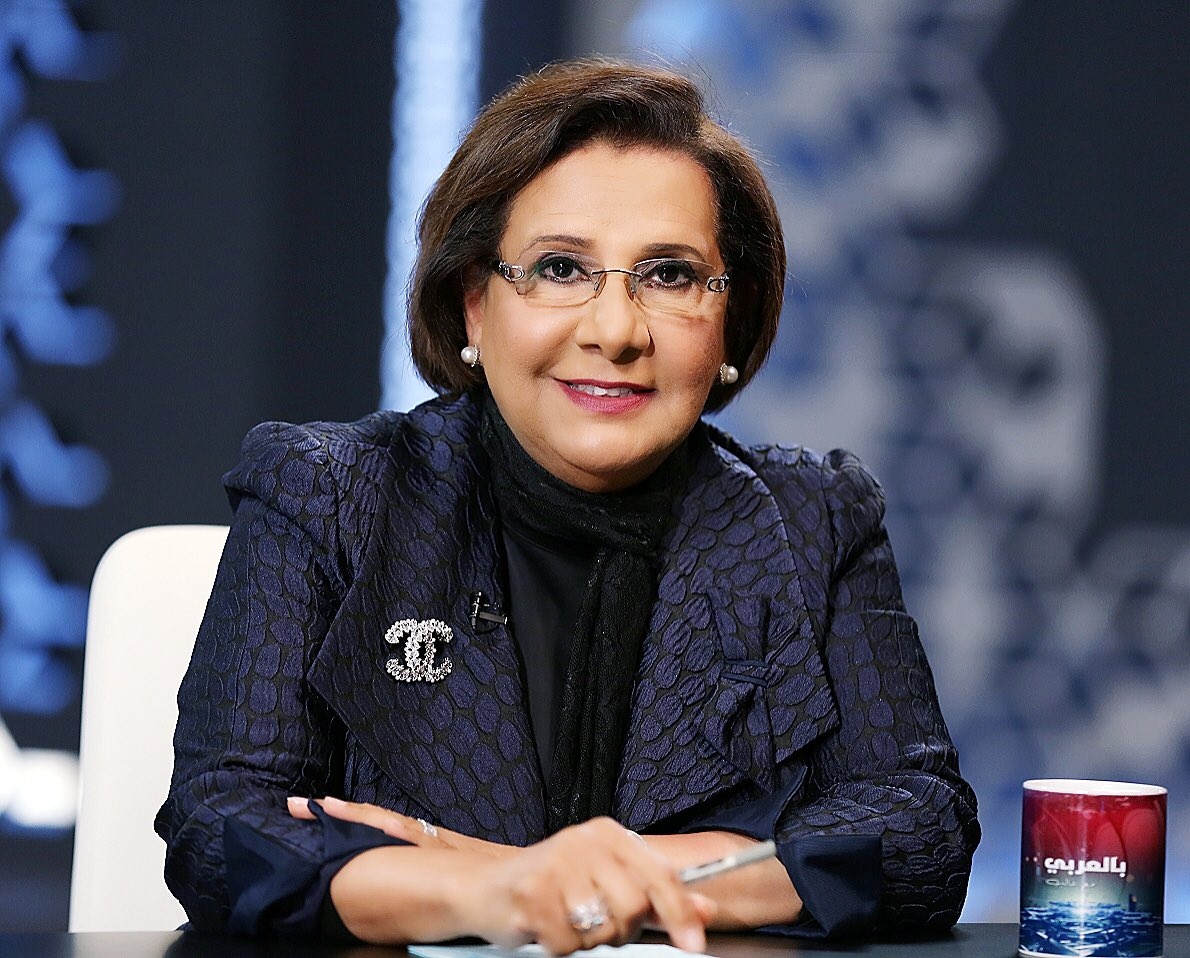
- Born: November 1949 (age 76–77)
- Title: Minister of State for Housing Affairs and Planning 2008 to 2009 Minister of Education and Higher Education 2009 to 2011 President of Arab Open University 2004 to 2008 then 2013 to 2018 Founding Administrative Board, Chair of Abdullah Al-Salem University, 2021 September till Now
- Spouse: Married
- Children: Mother of five

Moudi A. Al-Humoud (Arabic: موضي عبدالعزيز الحمود, born November 1949), is currently the Founding Administrative Board, Chair of Abdullah Al-Salem University in Kuwait and she is a professor of management at the College of Business Administration, Kuwait University. She served as president of Arab Open University, a pan Arab university operating in Kuwait, Kingdom of Saudi Arabia, Oman, Bahrain, Jordan, Lebanon, Egypt, Sudan and Palestine.

Al-Humoud was the former Minister of Education and Minister of Higher Education in Kuwait and also held the positions of Minister of State for Housing and Minister of Planning in Kuwait. She is a former member of Higher Council for Planning and Development in Kuwait, as well as a former member of the executive board for the International Institute of Administrative Sciences and Chair Person for the Public Enterprises Committee, Brussels, Belgium.

She is on the board of trustees of the Arab Open University and the Kuwait Institute for Scientific Research (KISR).

Recipient of Arab Women's Award for Education in 2016. She is a board member of Kuwait Fund For Arab Economic Development March 2019.

== Latest Releases ==
A book entitled: Issues and Opinions 2009-2020 “ Qadayaa w Raii” part 1 and 2 for the founding administrative board, chairwomen, of Abdullah Al-Salem University and the former Minister of Education, Prof. Muodi Al-Hamoud, has recently been published.

It contains a series of articles about which Dr. Al-Hamoud published in the Kuwaiti Al-Qabas newspaper during the period from: 2009 - 2020.

The publication of the book in two parts of medium pieces comes after the first publication of her articles in a book titled “We Have an Opinion – Walanaa Raii” given to her by her children as a gift on the occasion of Mother's Day in 2009.

Furthermore, the honor she was celebrated with, and the certificates of appreciation and prizes she received from many Arab and international institutions and institutions in a special section under the title: mahatat fee hayatii “Stations in my life.”

In addition to the praises of a number of official and civil figures of her national and humanitarian biography under the title: Qaloo Anii, “They said about me.”

Also, On the cover of both parts of her two books, prof. Al-Hamoud wrote a short words that carry wisdom and sincere advice in which she says:

“Do not compromise your principle under any circumstances. Reduce your intensity if necessary but don't compromise or color according to the circumstances because if you do that you are done. Stick to your principle, you may anger some people and some people may quarrel with you, but they will certainly respect you.”

== Early education ==
Al-Humoud attended Algeria Secondary School, an all girls high school in Kuwait. She graduated in 1969 and enrolled at Kuwait University majoring in business administration, graduating in 1972. She received a full scholarship from Kuwait University for her graduate education.

== Academic qualifications ==
Al-Humoud received high honors for her bachelor's degree in business administration from Kuwait University in 1972. She went on to earn her MBA in business administration and management from North Texas State University, US, in 1976, and subsequently earned her PhD in business administration from the City of London University, UK in 1979.

== Biography ==
Al-Humoud's distinguished career started in 1972 at the Kuwait Civil Service Bureau. A year later, she moved to Kuwait University (KU) as a teaching assistant for the Graduate Studies Program. In 1979 she became a lecturer for the university's Business Administration Department. In 1980 Al-Humoud was named as the head of the department.

Al-Humoud was a faculty member of Kuwait University in the Department of Management for 19 years (1986–2005), during which time she held the position of the dean of the College of Commerce, Economics and Political Science from 1983 to 1989. She was vice president for planning at Kuwait University from 1993 to June 2002 before moving on to her associate professorship at the College of Business Studies from June 2002 to August 2004.

Al-Humoud was the president of the Arab Open University from September 2004 – April 2008 as well as from January 2013 – January 2018. In between, she was appointed as State Minister for Planning and Development and State Minister for Housing and Government for the State of Kuwait from May 2008 – March 2009. In 2009, she was reappointed as the Minister of Education and Minister of Higher Education and held the position until May 2011. Upon completion of her service, Al-Humoud moved on to become Professor of Management at the College of Business Studies from May 2011 until 2013. She later became president of the Arab Open University from January 2013 – 2018.

Currently, Al-Humoud is professor of management at the College of Business Studies in Kuwait University.

Kuwait Television hosted an interview with Al-Humoud in January 2019. The interview is an autobiographical summary of her career in her own words.

== Activism ==
In addition to her professional career, Al-Humoud was involved in Kuwait's women rights activities since 1979. She joined Kuwait's Women Cultural & Social Society and the Graduate Society, both Kuwait based NGOs. In 2005 a group of women, including Moudi Al-Humoud, played a prominent role in amending Kuwait's electoral law resulting in Kuwaiti women attaining their full political rights. She participated in various activities in support of Arab Women Empowerment.

She is involved in multiple charities focusing on raising funds and awareness for the education of children with special needs. As a board member in the Journey of Hope (hopekw.org) campaign she played an instrumental role in the maiden voyage of the “Journey of Hope” boat which sailed from Kuwait to Washington, D.C., in 2014 with the purpose of spreading a message awareness for the benefit of people with intellectual disabilities.

Since 2014, Al-Humoud has been a board member of the Arab Student Aid International organization- Kuwait branch. Arab Student Aid International is an American-based organization that provides financial support to Arab students globally for university and post-graduate programs.

Al-Humoud continues to work with the Kuwait Red Crescent Society on various humanitarian programs especially during the Arab spring conflicts in the region.

== Professional affiliations ==
- Member of the advisory board, Arab Knowledge report- Hamdan Bin Rashid Al Maktoum Institute-UAE (2010–Present).
- Member of the Regional office – United Nations Development Bureau (Jan 2008–Present).
- Member of the Higher Council for Planning & Development Government of Kuwait 2004–2008.
- Member of the Higher Advisory Council, Arab Planning Institute (1999–2008).
- Member of the Executive Office – Kuwait Institute of Management and Technology appointed by Cabinet of Ministers-Kuwait (Nov 2002 – 2005).
- Member of the board of trustees – Kuwait Maastricht Business School (Sept 2002 – July 2004).
- Chairman – Fawsec board of trustees, a non-profit private educational institution that administers two schools: Al Bayan Bilingual School-Student Body(1700) Fawzia International Institute for special needs – Students body (170) (Sept 1998 – June 2004).
- General coordinator – Development Forum for Arabian Gulf countries (2000–2004).
- Registered qualified expert and arbitrator – Commercial Arbitration Center, Gulf Cooperation Council Countries (October 1996 – 2005)
- Chairman of Public Enterprise Research Committee of the International Institute of Administrative Science (IIAS) Brussels (July 1989 – June 1998).
- Member of International Institute of Administrative Sciences (IIAS) Executive Committee, Brussels (July 1989 – June 1994).
- Member of advisory committee to establish the "College of Management & Economics" Qatar University (1989–1992).

== Journal affiliations ==
- Chief editor – Journal of Social Sciences – Kuwait University (June 1986 – Dec 1989)
- Member of the editorial board – Journal of Administrative Sciences, Kuwait University (Feb 1996 – June 2001)

== Published papers ==
1. Linking Higher Education Graduates and job market needs ARAB Fund (2014).
2. Foreign faces in Kuwaiti places : The challenges of human capital utilization in Kuwait. International Journal of business and Management Vol. 7, No.20 2012 (Co-author) Canada.
3. Practical framework for organization performance evaluation and productivity improvement. Commerce and finance Journal (Arabic) Tanta University (April 2006).
4. Women in labor force – case of Kuwait and Gulf countries. International Review for Administration science (Arabic) UAE. Volume (5y3)(May 2004).
5. Leadership and organizational challenges. The journal of commerce and Economics. Ain shams University Egypt. 3rd Edition 2004.
6. Exploring the Implicit Leadership Theory in two Arabian Gulf States. Applied Psychology : An International Review. 2001, 50(4), 506–531, US (co-author).
7. Cultural Influences on Leadership and Organization "Project Globe" Advances in Global Leadership, Lead Article, Vol.1, W.H. Mobley, M/J. Gesner, & V. Arnold, Eds. Advance in Global Leadership, Stanford, CN:JaAL Press, 1999,171-233, US, (country co-author).
8. Culture Specific and Cross Culturally Generalizable Implicit Leadership Theories : Are Attributes of Charismatic / Transformation Leader Universally Endorsed Leadership Quarterly, Vol. 10, No. 2, 1999, 219–256, USA, (co-author).
9. The Industrial Sector and Measuring Its Success in attracting national Manpower and increasing its productivity, case of Kuwait, (co-author) (Dec 1998).
10. Evaluation of Training Process in the Banking Sector at the State of Kuwait, (co-author), Journal of Commerce, Zakazik University, Egypt, (Jan. 1998).
11. Higher Councils in the state of Kuwait, an Evaluation Study (Co-author), The Journal of Administrative Sciences, Kuwait, (Nov. 1995).
12. Survey of Management Training and Development, US, Vol. 14, (Nov. 1994).
13. Privatization, Case of Kuwait, submitted to the conference held by the center for Arab Unity Studies, March 1990, published in the Arab Future Journal, Center for Arab Unity Studies, Egypt, (April 1989).
14. Basic Approaches for Administrative Reforms in Kuwait, Journal of Social Sciences, University of Kuwait, Vol. 15, No. 4, Kuwait,( Winter 1987).
15. Industrial Establishments in Kuwait : "Development of self Motivational Powers", Journal of Co-operative Industry in Arabian Gulf, Vol. 5, No. 19, 1985, Riyadh.
16. The Role of Board of Directors in Public Companies in Theory and in Practice (Co-author), Journal of Gulf and Arabian Peninsula Studies, Vol. 9, No. 35, 1983 Kuwait.
17. The Profile of Top Management in the Business Sector, Its Effect on Decision Making (Co-author), Journal of Social Sciences, Vol. 10, No. 1, 1982, Kuwait.
18. Co-relation between Administrative reforms and Management development – a preface published in Journal of the world of Thought – Vol. 20, No.2, July/September 1989, Kuwait.

== Textbooks ==
1. "Qadayaa w Raii" Part 1, From 2009 - 2020
2. "Qadayaa w Raii" Part 2, From 2009 - 2020
3. "Introduction to Business Administration"(Co-author), Kuwait University Academic press, Kuwait 1986.
4. "Public Administration" – Ministry of Education (Co-author), Kuwait 1985 – 1986, With Dr. Ekhlas Abdalla.

== Editorials and contributions ==
1. "Qadayaa w Raii" Part 1, From 2009 - 2020
2. "Qadayaa w Raii" Part 2, From 2009 - 2020
3. "Walana Raii" Book, Published in April 2009, Consisting of a large no. of editorials published in Al Qabas Newspaper, Al Jareeda, Al Watan Newspaper from April 1982 – May 2009.
4. Columnist in Kuwaiti newspapers – Al Qabas, from 1985. She currently publishes a weekly column in the journal.
5. Columnist in Kuwaiti newspapers – Al Jareeda, from 2003 to 2005.
6. Columnist in Kuwaiti newspapers – Al Watan 1982 to 1985.

== Workshops and conferences ==
1. Educational Reform of Government The John Kennedy School – Harvard University (April 23 – May 21, 2006).
2. Women in Leadership "The John Kennedy School Government " – Harvard University, May 2005.
3. The 24th International Conference of Administrative Sciences, Paris – France, September 7-11-1998. The Citizen & Public Administration.
4. Modern Strategic Approaches for Administrative teaching in the Arab World, Cairo – November 1997.
5. The Third Annual Conference for raising Public Service Standards, Kuwait – May 1995 (Presented a paper).
6. International Institute for Administrative Sciences (IIAS) Society & Public Administration, UAE – Summer of 1994.
7. Labor Market in Kuwait Organized by the Graduate Association, Kuwait April 1994 (Presented a paper).
8. Mergers of Banks & Financial Institutions KFAS The Economic Association, Kuwait, November 1993 (Presented a paper).
9. The 21st Administrative Sciences Conference, Austria – Vienna, June 1992.
10. Human Resources in Banks & Arab Financial Institutions Arab Institute for Banking Studies, Cairo, October 1992.
11. The 4th Training & Administrative Development Conference Towards an Arabic model for theory and practice, Cairo, March 1990.
12. The 20th Conference for Administrative Sciences, Morocco, June 1989.
13. The 3rd Scientific Conference for Administrative Development in the Arab World Arab Institute for Administrative Sciences, Morocco, 1984.
14. The 3rd Regional Conference for Women in the Gulf and Arabian Peninsula, Abu Dhabi, 1984 (Research Critique).
15. Role of Accounting Information in Expenditure – College of Commerce, Economics & Political Sciences KFAS, Kuwait Society of Accountants, Kuwait 1984.
16. Development of money Markets in Kuwait College of Commerce, Economics & Political Sciences Central Bank of Kuwait, Kuwait 1984.
17. The 2nd Conference for Administrative Development in the Arab World Amman, 1983 (Presented a paper).
18. The Annual Conference for Research College of Commerce, Economics & Political Science, Kuwait, February 1982 (Presented a Paper).
19. Strategies of Industry in Kuwait Chamber of Commerce, Kuwait University, Kuwait 1979. Participant and representative of Kuwait University.

== Membership in committees and councils ==
=== Local and regional level ===
1. Member of the Higher Council for Planning & Development from 2004 to 2008.
2. Formation of an Education & Training Strategy in Kuwait for the Coning decades Supreme Council for Planning – Kuwait,1997.
3. Member of the executive board of the Democratic Forum in Kuwait 1989–present.
4. Establishment of the College of Administration & Economics – Qatar University, 1984 & Advisory Board Member Until March 1995.
5. Higher Advisory Committee to evaluate the Education System in Kuwait 1986–1987.
6. Higher Committee For Development & Revising the Administrative Structure in Kuwait Performance Evaluation Committee 1985.
7. Administrative Reform Committee – Minister of Education – Kuwait, 1985.
8. Higher Advisory Committee to develop Kuwait's Military College – Kuwait 1984.
9. Special Study to develop Work Methods at The Public Authority for Minors Center – Amiri Diwan, 1984.
10. Housing Policies Study Committee – Amiri Diwan – Kuwait, 1993.
11. Formulation of Socio Economic and Social Strategy for GCC Countries – GCC,1983.
12. Formulation of Study Programs at the Public Authority for Applied Education & Training – Kuwait, 1982.

=== University level ===
Participated in a host of technical and specialized committees across the Kuwait University level as well as the faculty level and scientific section as an academic at the university.

- Chair, Planning & Building Programs Kuwait University 1998–2002.
- University Council – Faculty Dean – vice president.
- Faculty council head, Faculty Committees such as appointments and Scholarships.
- Scientific Section Council, Appointment & Scholarship Committee and other work-related committees.
