= Kuwait Youth Public Authority =

The Kuwait Youth Public Authority is one of the public bodies regulated by Law No. 100 of 2015, and in 2021 the Ministry of State for Youth Affairs was merged with the Public Authority for Youth Affairs, which in turn is concerned with youth affairs through their participation in preparing and developing the strategies of the Authority.

The current Minister is Abdulrahman Badah Al-Mutairi.

== Authority objectives ==
The Kuwait Youth Public Authority is responsible for everything related to youth, by integrating the aspirations of the youth with the goals of the Authority, organizing and exchanging knowledge and building a national community consensus. The Kuwait Youth Public Authority is responsible for the following matters:

- Preserving the Kuwaiti national identity.
- Striking a balance between rights and duties.
- Education on the values of intellectual balance.
- Protecting young people intellectually, socially, culturally and practically.
- Openness to the world and other cultures.
- Adopting programs and projects that enhance the skills of young people for their social and economic contribution.

== Functions of the authority ==
The Public Authority for Youth seeks to achieve its goals and exercise its executive role through the following specializations:

- Adopting and implementing proposals for the youth category.
- Organizing educational, cultural and scientific activities in various disciplines and fields.
- Facilitating youth participation in local, Arab and international events, courses, festivals and conferences, in coordination with the competent authorities.
- Supervising and sponsoring youth centers, and providing them with financial, administrative and service support.
- Preparing for organized and continuous dialogue forums with young people
- Building a central database of data and information related to Kuwaiti youth related to the law, and working to update it permanently.
