= Nora Mohammad Al-Mashaan =

Kuwaiti engineer and academic (born 1981)

- الدكتورة نورة محمد المشعان

Minister of Public Works
- Incumbent
- Assumed office 17 January 2024
- Monarch: Mishal Al-Ahmad Al-Jaber Al-Sabah
- Prime Minister: Mohammad Sabah Al-Salem Al-Sabah; Ahmad Al-Abdullah Al-Sabah
- Preceded by: Yousef Al-Obaid

Personal details
- Born: 1981 (age 44–45)
- Education: Kuwait University; Johns Hopkins University
- Occupation: Civil engineer Academic

Nora Mohammad Al-Mashaan (Arabic: نورة محمد المشعان, romanized: Nūrah Muḥammad al-Mushʻān; born 1981) is a Kuwaiti civil engineer and academic. She has been serving as Minister of Public Works of Kuwait since 2024 and also served as Minsiter of State for Municipal Affairs in 2024.

== Early life and education ==
Al-Mashaan was born in 1981. Al-Mashaan got a degree in civil engineering in 2003 and a master's degree in 2007 from Kuwait University. She obtained a master's degree in coastal engineering from Johns Hopkins University in the United States in 2012, and in 2014, she became the first Arab woman to obtain a PhD in a rare specialisation when she was awarded a PhD in coastal disaster engineering and oil spill management from the Johns Hopkins University.

== Career ==
She is an associate professor in the Department of Civil Engineering at Kuwait University and an engineering consultant at the Kuwait Ports Authority. Al-Mashaan has chaired the Consultancy and Training Committee in the Department of Civil Engineering at Kuwait University and is a member of the Supreme Committee of the International Conference on Sustainable Infrastructure Challenges. She has published scientific articles and taken part in conferences and seminars.

Kuwaiti emir Mishal Al-Ahmad Al-Jaber Al-Sabah appointed her as the new Minister of Public Works and Minister of State for Municipal Affairs, being the only woman in the cabinet of newly appointed prime minister Mohammad Sabah Al-Salem Al-Sabah, and she was sworn in on 17 January 2024 at Bayan Palace. She was re-appointed and was sworn in on 12 May 2024 in the new cabinet of prime minister Ahmad Al-Abdullah Al-Sabah. Following the cabinet reshuffle on 25 August 2024, Al-Mashaan no longer held the portfolio of Minister of State for Municipal Affairs.

In May 2024, Al-Mashaan highlighted several strategic national projects as priorities, including Terminal 2 at Kuwait International Airport, the rail link to Saudi Arabia, the Umm Al-Haiman desalination plant and the new maternity hospital. In October 2024 she signed 18 contracts for the complete overhaul of the country’s road network. In December 2025, she signed a $4 trillion contract with China for the construction of the Mubarak Al Kabeer Port.
