= Fahad Yusuf Al-Sabah =

Kuwaiti Minister

Sheikh Fahad Yusuf Al-Sabah
- فهد يوسف سعود الصباح
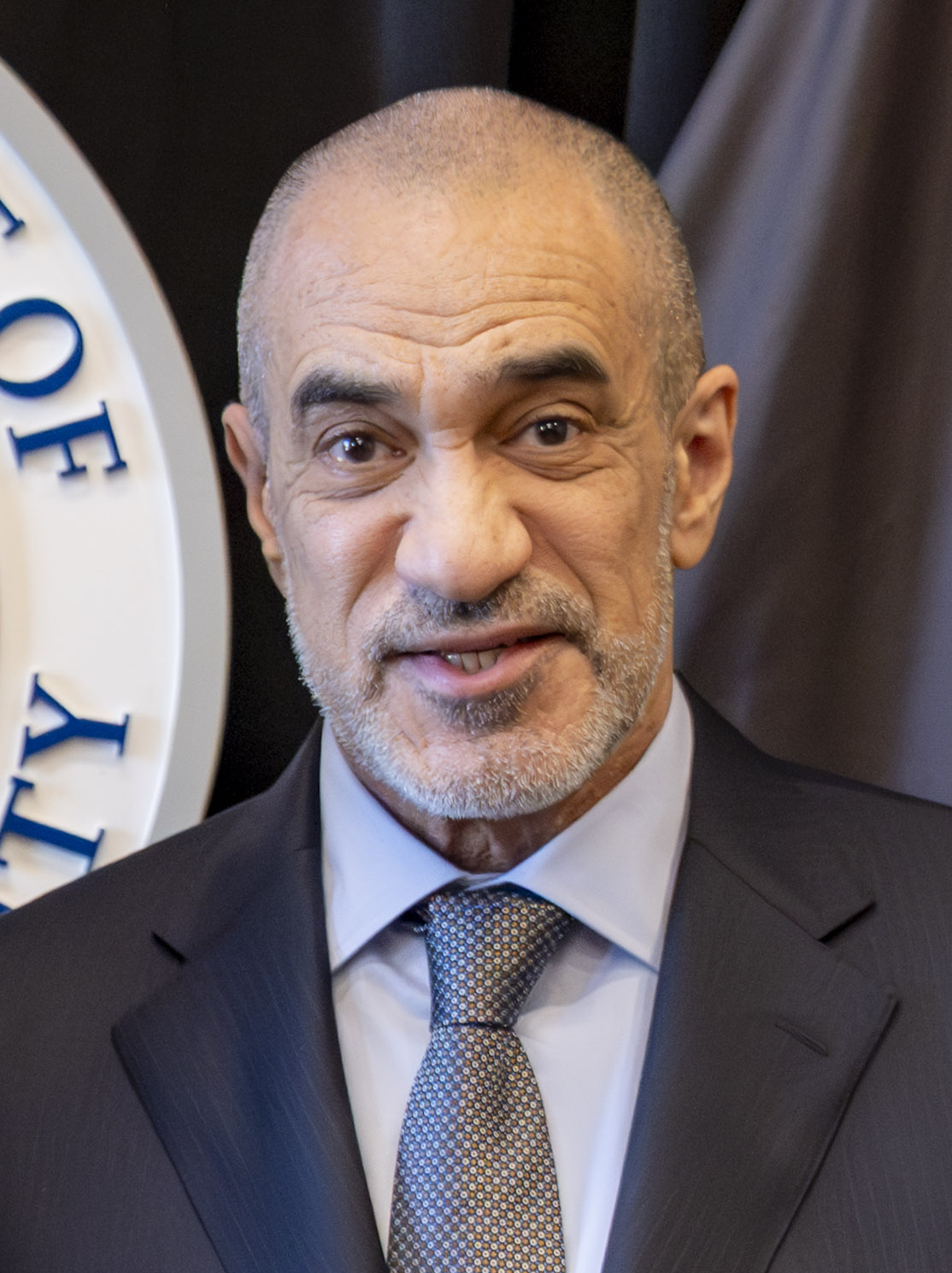
- Al-Sabah in 2025

Deputy Prime Minister and Minister of Interior
- Incumbent
- Assumed office 17 January 2024
- Monarch: Mishal Al-Ahmad Al-Jaber Al-Sabah
- Prime Minister: Mohammad Sabah Al-Salem Al-Sabah; Ahmad Al-Abdullah Al-Sabah
- Preceded by: Talal Khaled Al-Ahmad Al-Sabah

Minister of Defense
- In office 17 January 2024 – 4 February 2025
- Preceded by: Ahmed Al-Fahad Al-Ahmed Al-Sabah
- Succeeded by: Abdullah Ali Al-Abdullah Al-Salem Al-Sabah

Personal details
- Born: 1 May 1959 (age 66)
- Citizenship: Kuwait

Sheikh Fahad Yusuf Saud Al-Sabah (born 1959) is a former Kuwaiti military officer. He served as Deputy Prime Minister and Minister of Interior from January 17, 2024, and as Minister of Defense from January 17, 2024, until February 4, 2025.

== Biography ==
Sheikh Fahd Yusuf Saud Al-Mohammed Al-Sabah was born on May 1, 1959. After graduating from the Military College in Kuwait, he worked as an officer in the Kuwaiti Army's Amiri Guard, eventually retiring with the rank of Colonel. Notably, he was involved in the evacuation and protection of the then Amir of Kuwait, Sheikh Jaber Al-Ahmad Al-Sabah, and the Crown Prince, Sheikh Saad Al-Salim Al-Sabah, to Saudi Arabia in 1990 following the Iraqi invasion of Kuwait.

On January 17, 2024, an Amiri decree was issued for the formation of the government, appointing him as the Deputy Prime Minister, the Minister of Defense, and the Minister of Interior.

== Controversy ==
=== Citizenship Revocation Campaign (2024–present) ===
In late 2024, Fahad Yusuf Al-Sabah initiated a sudden controversial policy to revoke the citizenship of approximately 42,000 Kuwaiti nationals, resulting in widespread statelessness within a six-month period. Al-Sabah publicly described the revocations as targeting fraudulent citizenship cases; however, critics highlighted that more than two-thirds of those affected were women who had legally acquired nationality under Article 8 of Kuwait’s nationality law, through marriage to Kuwaiti citizens. Many of these women had held citizenship for decades before abruptly losing their status without prior notice, causing significant public anxiety and social disruption.

Kuwait faced extensive domestic and international criticism, with human rights advocates and opposition figures asserting that his actions were discriminatory and politically motivated. Following widespread backlash, Al-Sabah partially reversed some of the policy’s most severe effects, reinstating affected individuals’ access to banking services, pensions, and essential government services. Despite these measures, criticism persisted over the long-term implications for Kuwait’s democratic reputation and social cohesion.
