= Salem Abdullah Al-Jaber Al-Sabah =

Kuwaiti politician (born 1957)

- سالم عبدالله الجابر الصباح
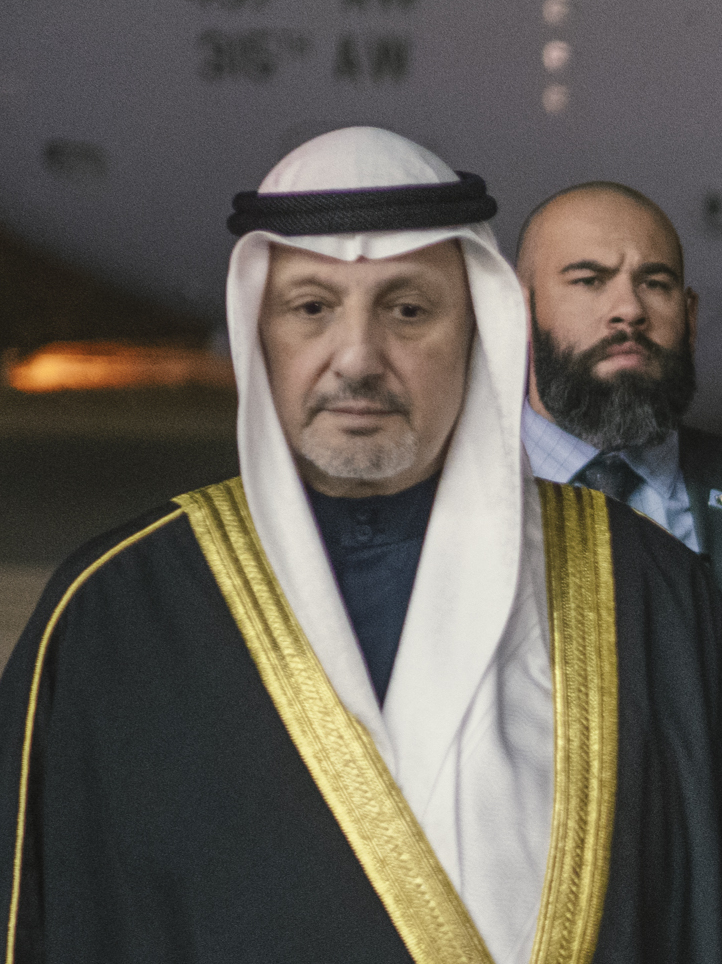
- Official portrait, 2022

6th Minister of Foreign Affairs
- In office 16 October 2022 – 17 January 2024
- Prime Minister: Ahmad Nawaf Al-Ahmad Al-Sabah
- Preceded by: Ahmad Nasser Al-Mohammad Al-Sabah
- Succeeded by: Abdullah Al-Yahya

Ambassador of Kuwait to the United States
- In office 10 October 2001 – 23 June 2022
- Prime Minister: Saad Al-Salim; Nasser Al-Mohammed Al-Sabah; Jaber Al-Mubarak Al-Hamad Al-Sabah
- Preceded by: Mohammad Sabah Al-Salem Al-Sabah
- Succeeded by: Al-Zain Sabah Al-Naser Al-Sabah

Personal details
- Born: 24 September 1957 (age 69) Kuwait City, Kuwait
- Spouse: Sheikha Rima al-Sabah
- Education: American University of Beirut (BSc)(MSc)

Sheikh Salem Abdullah Al-Jaber Al-Sabah (Arabic: سالم عبدالله الجابر الصباح, romanized: Sālim ʿAbdullāh al-Jābir aṣ-Ṣabāḥ: born 24 September 1957) is a member of the Kuwaiti royal family who served as Minister of Foreign Affairs from 2022 to 2023. He previously served as ambassador of Kuwait to the United States of America from June 2001 until May 2022.

== Early life and education ==
A member of the ruling House of Sabah, Salem was born on 24 September 1957. His father was Sheikh Abdullah Al-Jaber Al-Sabah, a former Minister of Education and adviser to the Kuwaiti emir, while his mother, Layla Abdulqader Al-Merhebi, was Lebanese and the sister of former Lebanese member of parliament Talal Al-Merhebi. Al-Sabah spent part of his early life in Lebanon and studied at the American University of Beirut, in 1981, he received a Bachelor of Arts in political studies from the American University of Beirut in Lebanon. There, he met his future wife, Rima.

== Career ==
Al-Sabah has also been the ambassador of Kuwait to Korea (1998), minister plenipotentiary (1998) and first secretary to the Permanent Mission of Kuwait to the United Nations, New York (1997–1998).

From 1986 to 1991 he was the diplomatic attaché for the Office of the Minister of State for Foreign Affairs in Kuwait.

== Personal life ==
He speaks Arabic, English and French. He is married to Lebanese-born former journalist Sheikha Rima al-Sabah, whom he met in 1983 when both were students in Beirut. They married in 1988 and have four sons.
