= Ahmad Al-Abdullah Al-Sabah =

Prime Minister of Kuwait since 2024

His Highness Sheikh Ahmad Al-Abdullah Al-Sabah
- أحمد العبد الله الأحمد الصباح
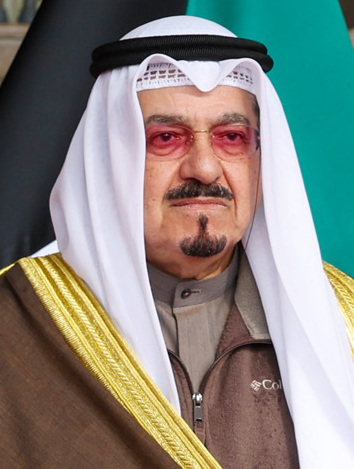
- Sabah in 2024

11th Prime Minister of Kuwait
- Incumbent
- Assumed office 15 May 2024
- Monarch: Mishal Al-Ahmad Al-Jaber Al-Sabah
- Preceded by: Mohammad Sabah Al-Salem Al-Sabah

Minister of Oil
- In office February 2009 – May 2011
- Monarch: Sabah Al-Ahmad Al-Jaber Al-Sabah
- Prime Minister: Nasser Mohammed Al-Ahmed Al-Sabah
- Preceded by: Mohammad Al Olaim
- Succeeded by: Mohammad Al Busairi

Personal details
- Born: 5 September 1952 (age 73) Kuwait City, Kuwait
- Relations: Al-Sabah family
- Parent: Abdullah Al-Ahmad Al-Jaber Al-Sabah (father)
- Religion: Sunni Islam

Ahmad Al-Abdullah Al-Ahmad Al-Sabah (Note: Arabic: أحمد العبد الله الأحمد الصباح) (born 5 September 1952) is a Kuwaiti economist, politician and a senior member of the ruling family, Al Sabah. He served as the minister of oil between 2009 and 2011.

On 15 April 2024, he was appointed the Prime Minister-designate, and his premiership began exactly one month later on 15 May 2024.

== Early life and education ==
Sabah was born on 5 September 1952. He received a bachelor's degree in finance from the University of Illinois in 1975.

== Career ==
Sabah worked at the Central Bank of Kuwait from 1978 to 1987. Then he worked at the private finance institutions from 1987 to 1999. During this period he was the chairman of the Burgan Bank SAK. He was the minister of finance from 1999 to 2001. He was appointed minister of communication in 1999. He was nominated as health minister in March 2007, but was given no confidence vote at the National Assembly which led to the resignation of the government on 4 March.

In February 2009 Sabah was appointed oil minister, being the fifth minister since 2006. He replaced Mohammad Al Olaim as oil minister who resigned from office in November 2008. Between November 2008 and February 2009 Mohammad Sabah Al Sabah served as acting oil minister. Ahmad Al Sabah's tenure as oil minister ended in May 2011 when Mohammad Al Busairi replaced him in the aforementioned post.

Sabah was made the head of the Crown Prince’s Court in 2021. He was named as the prime minister-designate on 15 April 2024, and succeeded Mohammed Sabah Al Salem Al Sabah in the post after forming his cabinet and taking the oath of office before the Kuwaiti Emir on 15 May.

== Personal life ==
Sabah is married and has three children.
