= Ministry of Information and Culture (Kuwait) =

Government ministry of Kuwait

The Ministry of Information and Culture of Kuwait is one of the ministries of the State of Kuwait. It was established in 1979 by a decree issued by the state's ruler Sheikh Jaber Al-Ahmad Al-Jaber Al-Sabah. The ministry undertakes the media, intellectual and cultural policy and contributes to sponsoring art. The Ministry of Information is also concerned with tourism and antiquities affairs.

Following a government reshuffling on February 1, 2026, the Minister of Information and Culture is Abdullah Boftain., but he was replaced before he was sworn in.

== Ministry history ==
The year 1954 witnessed the beginning of Kuwait's media march. The Official Gazette was established, and shortly after its issuance, it was attached with its printing presses to the Department of Printing and Publishing, established in 1955 and headed by Sheikh Sabah Al-Ahmad. In 1959, the Emiri decree was issued, which stipulated the term “Press and Publishing Department for all issues related to the press.” At the beginning of 1962, government departments were transformed into ministries. The official name of the Department of Governmental Publications and Publishing became “Ministry of Guidance and News”. The Radio and Television Department was attached to it. It took over all Publication media and films, which were taken over by the Ministry of Social Affairs and Labor and renamed it in February 1971, becoming the Ministry of Information. As for Kuwait Radio, the sound “Here is Kuwait” was launched for the first time in 1951. The half-century development of work in the radio and media efforts resulted in the emergence of eight radio stations within the framework of Radio Kuwait, broadcasting their programs in four languages for a period of 72 hours a day.

Kuwait TV started fast and developed steps since 1961. The Ministry of Guidance and News at that time took over the responsibility for television broadcasting. In 1969, Kuwait established a television transmission station in Dubai under the name “Kuwait TV from Dubai.”

== Ministry missions and objectives ==
In 2021, the Kuwaiti Ministry of Information and Culture launched a five-year strategy, to develop the official media in the country and enable it to play an influential role in society through the various tools it possesses. The strategy was prepared under the directives of the political leadership in Kuwait, with the aim of developing the government media apparatus in Kuwait to exercise its role to complete the development process. Minister of Information and Culture and Minister of State for Youth Affairs, Abdul Rahman Al-Mutairi, affirmed the ministry's determination to develop the government media apparatus to enable it to exercise its role in achieving sustainable development, and to become a primary source of knowledge. The strategy, according to Al-Mutairi, is based on the development of human resources in the ministry by supporting cadres, competencies and media talents, in addition to developing and renewing balanced Kuwaiti media discourse and content in line with the social and cultural context of the community, as well as strengthening the infrastructure of the ministry by providing more high technologies and modern devices to keep pace with global developments in this field.

The strategy supports the production of drama, theatrical and cinematic arts, in addition to the establishment of a media production city, and the establishment of national councils and bodies specialized in media.

== Ministry objectives ==
- Develop a new unified visual identity for the Ministry of Information and its affiliated sectors in accordance with the highest technical standards.
- Develop and maximize financial resources and develop media and advertising marketing methods and tools.
- Strengthening the infrastructure, developing engineering and technical capabilities, and following up on the latest broadcasting and production technologies.
- Implementing events and celebrations and consolidating the cultural, intellectual and artistic heritage with a modern creative vision.
- Introducing and developing legislation to keep pace with the changes in line with the vision of a new Kuwait.
- Supporting production for serials, theatrical and cinematic arts, according to a cultural and social vision.
- Establishing a city for media production and increasing competitiveness in the Gulf and the Arab world.
- Structuring sectors and establishing specialized national councils and bodies in the fields of media.

The ministry is also concerned with contributing to the dissemination of culture, diversifying sources of knowledge, sponsoring arts and literature in its various aspects, in addition to supervising tourism and working to encourage it, diversify its activities, and cooperate with Arab and foreign countries and organizations in the fields of media and journalism.

== List of ministers ==
Name	Took office	Left office
Sabah Al-Ahmad	1962	1963
Mubarak Abdullah Al-Ahmad Al-Sabah	1963	1963
Sabah Al-Ahmad	1963	1964
Jaber Al-Ali Al-Salem Al-Sabah	1964	1981
Sabah Al-Ahmad	1981	1985
Nasser Al-Mohammed Ahmad Al-Jaber Al-Sabah	1985	1986
Jaber Al-Mubarak Al-Hamad Al-Sabah	1988	1990
Bader Al Yaqoub	1990	1992
Saud Nasser Al-Soud Al-Sabah	1992	1996
Youssef Mohammed Al-Sumait	1998	1999
Saad Bin Tefla	1999	2000
Saud Nasser Al-Soud Al-Sabah	2000	2001
Ahmed Al-Fahad Al-Ahmad Al-Sabah	2001	2003
Mohammed Abdullah Abulhassan	2003	2005
Dr. Anas Mohammed Al-Rasheed	2005	2006
Mohammed Nasser Al-Sanousi	2006	2007
Bader Nasser Al-Hameedi	2006	2006
Abdullah Saud Al Muhalibi	2007	2007
Sabah Al-khalid Al-Sabah	2008	2009
Ahmad Al Abdullah Al Sabah	2009	2011
Muhammad Abdullah Al-Mubarak Al-Sabah	2012	2012
Salman Sabah Al-Salem Al-Homoud Al-Sabah	2012	2015
Muhammad Abdullah Al-Mubarak Al-Sabah	2016	2016
Mohammed Al-Jabri	2016	2020
Abdul Rahman Badah Al-Mutairi	2020	2021
Dr. Hamad Ahmed Rouh El Din	2021	2022
Abdul Rahman Badah Al-Mutairi	2022	2026
Abdullah Boftain	2026	Present
