= Ministry of Justice (Kuwait) =

Government ministry of Kuwait

The Kuwaiti Ministry of Justice is the ministry responsible for judicial, legal, financial, and administrative affairs. It was established by a decree issued by Sheikh Jaber Al-Ahmad Al-Jaber Al-Sabah on 16 February 1978. The current minister is Nasser Yousef Mohammed Al-Sumait.

== Ministry tasks ==
The ministry is responsible for all of the following:

- Adhering to and maintaining the rules of procedure that govern both civil and criminal courts
- Investigating and prosecuting crime in accordance with the provisions of law; responsibilities extend to both serious crimes and misdemeanor
- Supervising prisons
- Providing technical expertise to parties and other government departments
- Enforcing judicial documents and lawsuit declarations
- Executing sentences and executive bonds, including accepting, depositing, and disbursing the relevant sums, in accordance with the provisions of law.

The Ministry of Justice of Kuwait is also responsible for the following, which must be enacted in accordance with the provisions of law:

- Registration, authentication, and certification of properties
- Maintenance of commercial books
- Protection/guarding of minors and other vulnerable populations
- Tracking inventory of the legacies of unknown persons or persons whose heirs are not known
- Wherever necessary, keeping such legacies transferred from government agencies and handing them over to the beneficiaries in accordance with the rules in force
- Cooperating with other Arab and Islamic countries and organizations in the legal and judicial fields.

== List of ministers ==
- Abdallah al-Muffaraj (1978-1981)
- Salman al-Duayi Al Sabah (1982-1985) [referred to as the Minister of Justice, Legal & Administrative Affairs]
- Sa'ud Muhammed al-'Usaymi (1986) [referred to as the Minister of Justice, Legal & Administrative Affairs]
- Dhari Abdallah Uthman (1987-1991) [referred to as the Minister of Justice, Legal & Administrative Affairs]
- Ghazi Ubayd al-Samar (1992) [referred to as the Minister of Justice, Legal & Administrative Affairs]
- Mishari al-Jasim al-Anjari (1993-1996) [referred to as the Minister of Justice, Legal & Administrative Affairs]
- Muhammed Dayfallah al-Sharar (1997-1998) [referred to as the Minister of Justice, Legal & Administrative Affairs]
- Ahmad Khalid Kulayb (1999) [referred to as the Minister of Justice, Legal & Administrative Affairs]
- Saad Jasim Yusif al-Hashil (2000-2001)
- Ahmad Yaqub Baqir (2002-2005)
- Abdullah al Matouq (2006-2007)
- Hussein Nasser Al-Huraiti (2008-2009)
- Rashed Abdul Mohsen al-Hammaad (2009-2010)
- Ahmad Abdulmohsen al-Mulaifi (2011-2014)
- Nayef Al Ajmi (2014)
- Yaqoub Al-Sane (2014-2016)
- Fahad Mohammed Mohsen Al-Afasi(2017-2020)
- Nawaf Al-Yassin(2020-2021)
- Abdullah Youssef Abdurrahman Al-Roumi(2020-2021)
- Jamal Hadhel Al-Jalwai(2021-2022)
- Abdulaziz Majid Al-Majid (2022–2023)
- Amer Mohammad Ali Mohammad (2023-2023)
- Faleh Abdullah Eid Faleh Al-Roqba (2023-2023)
- Faisal Saeed Al-Ghareeb (2024-2024)
- Mohammad Ibrahim Al-Wasmi (2024-2024)
- Nasser Yousef Mohammed Al-Sumait (2024-present)

== See also ==
- Justice ministry
- Politics of Kuwait
