= Ahmad Abdulwahab Al-Awadhi =

Kuwaiti politician

Ahmad Abdulwahab Al-Awadhi is a politician and Kuwait Minister of Health. He holds a PhD in Pediatrics (Kuwait Board) from the Kuwait Institute for Medical Specialization and graduated as a medical doctor from Arabian Gulf University.
