= Ministry of Foreign Affairs (Kuwait) =

Government ministry of Kuwait

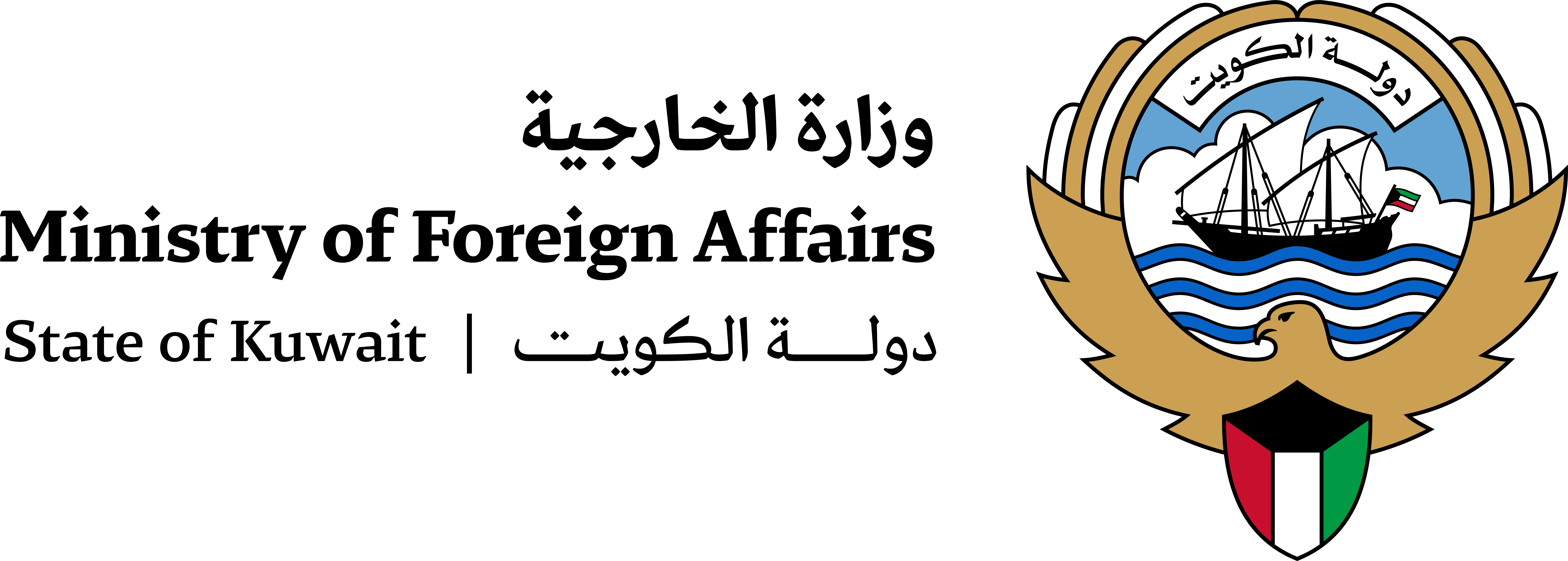

Ministerial Department overview
- Formed: 1961; 65 years ago
- Preceding Ministerial Department: Foreign Affairs Department Bureau
- Jurisdiction: Government of Kuwait
- Headquarters: Kuwait City
- Minister responsible: Jarrah Jaber Al-Ahmad Al-Sabah, Minister of Foreign Affairs
- Child Ministerial Department: State of Kuwait Ambassadors Bureau; Military Correspondents Attachés Bureau
- Website: Official Website of the Ministry of Foreign Affairs

The Ministry of Foreign Affairs (Arabic: وزارة الخارجية, romanized: wizāra al-khārijiyya) is one of the governmental bodies of Kuwait and part of the cabinet. It was established in 1961.

== History and overview ==
In 1961, a Foreign Affairs Department Bureau was established in Kuwait to organize the foreign relations of the country which was soon relaunched as the Ministry of Foreign Affairs, becoming the first ministerial body of the country.

The first foreign minister of Kuwait was Sabah Al Salim Al Sabah. He was followed by Sabah Al Ahmed Al Jaber Al Sabah.

The Ministry of Foreign Affairs delegates the bureau of ambassadors and military attachés in foreign diplomatic missions in countries like China, France, Germany, Italy, Japan, South Korea, Russia, the United Kingdom and the United States and so on. In other words, Kuwait maintains a very strong diplomatic relationship with China, France, Germany, Italy, Japan, South Korea, Russia, the United Kingdom and the United States and many more countries around the world.

== List of ministers of foreign affairs and deputy prime ministers ==
No.	Name	Portrait	Title	Term of office	Note
1	Sabah Al-Salim Al-Sabah		Minister of Foreign Affairs	1962–1963	12 Ruler and 2nd Emir of Kuwait (1965–1977)
2	Sabah Al-Ahmad Al-Jaber Al-Sabah		Deputy Prime Minister and Minister of Foreign Affairs	1963–2003	15 Ruler and 5th Emir of Kuwait (2006–2020)
3	Mohammad Sabah Al-Salem Al-Sabah		Deputy Prime Minister and Minister of Foreign Affairs	2003–2011	Ambassador of Kuwait to the United States (1993–2001)
4	Sabah Al-Khalid Al-Sabah		Deputy Prime Minister and Minister of Foreign Affairs	2011–2019	Kuwait's permanent member mission to the United Nations (1983–1989); Kuwait's Ambassador to Saudi Arabia (1995–1998); Kuwait's 9th Prime Minister (2019–2022)
5	Ahmad Nasser Al-Mohammad Al-Sabah		Minister of Foreign Affairs	2019–2022	Kuwait's extraordinary and plenipotentiary ambassador in 2005; Kuwait's Assistant Foreign Minister for First Deputy Prime Minister and Foreign Minister's Office Affairs in 2016; Kuwait's Assistant Foreign Minister for the Deputy Prime Minister and Foreign Minister's Office Affairs in 2017
6	Salem Abdullah Al-Jaber Al-Sabah		Minister of Foreign Affairs	2022–2024	Ambassador of Kuwait to the United States (2001–2022)
7	Abdullah Ali Al-Yahya		Minister of Foreign Affairs	2024–2026	Ambassador of Kuwait to Argentina (2018–2019)
8	Jarrah Jaber Al-Ahmad Al-Sabah		Minister of Foreign Affairs	2026–present	

== See also ==
- Foreign relations of Kuwait
