= Ministry of Health (Kuwait) =

Government ministry of Kuwait

Ministerial Department overview
- Formed: 1936; 90 years ago
- Jurisdiction: Government of Kuwait
- Headquarters: Arabian Gulf Street, Sulaibikhat, Kuwait City
- Minister responsible: Dr. Ahmad Abdulwahab Al-Awadhi
- Website: www.moh.gov.kw

The Ministry of Health (Arabic: وزارة الصحة) is one of the governmental bodies of Kuwait. It is the ministry responsible for the public health of citizens and residents of the State of Kuwait and for drawing up the health policy plan in Kuwait. It was established in 1936, and is now headed by Dr. Ahmad Abdulwahab Al-Awadhi.

The Ministry of Health is the ministry responsible for the public health of citizens and residents of the State of Kuwait and for drawing up the health policy plan in Kuwait. It was established in 1936, and is now headed by Dr. Ahmad Abdulwahab Al-Awadhi.

== Ministry history ==
The health care system in the State of Kuwait began as a modern regulatory law in 1944, when Sheikh Ahmad Al-Jaber Al-Sabah issued a law that included fourteen articles that included the organizational matters of the Health Department of the Health Council in addition to the powers of the administrative director of the department and the powers of the technical director (chief physician) of health during that period. In 1939, the first governmental health clinic was opened in Kuwait and later became for men and another clinic for women was built, while in 1944 it was the first private clinic for women.

In 1944, Dr. Hikmat Al-Khaja was assigned by the department to take charge of the health of school students, public health in the markets, and examination of food handlers and sellers. In 1947, Dr. Riyad Mukhtar Faraj, director of the Health of Knowledge, who developed plans to educate and treat students, and set up a clinic in each school. This was the nucleus and launch of the first school health in Kuwait, where the School Health Department was established in 1951.

=== Formation of the Department of Public Health ===
Governmental health services began in Kuwait coinciding with the establishment of the municipality department in 1930, which took upon itself the health of citizens and residents until the formation of the Public Health Department in 1936, and during that period witnessed the formation of many departments, at which time the Basic Law of the Kuwaiti Legislative Council was issued in 1938 And within the second article that stipulates the health law (which is intended to enact a health law that protects the country and its people from the dangers of epidemics of any kind), the department, like other government departments at that period, had an elected or appointed council (consisting of twelve members) that helped the workflow of the administration It discusses its general policy and assists its head and director in the department's affairs. The Public Health Department was headed at that time by Sheikh Abdullah Al-Salem Al-Sabah from (1936-1952).

=== The first hospital in Kuwait ===
The construction of the first hospital in the State of Kuwait was affiliated with the American mission in 1912, and it was the first building of iron and cement to be erected in Kuwait, when Sheikh Mubarak Al-Sabah asked at that time to open a hospital for Kuwaitis and develop medicine, and the mission at that time had a good reputation in Basra and sent a medical committee composed of John Van S and Arthur Bennett to negotiate with Sheikh Mubarak Al-Sabah about a suitable location for the hospital. As a result of these negotiations, the mission acquired a plot of land that was the nucleus of its medical center in Kuwait. They share the work within a year due to the lack of medical staff at the time, they are Dr. Bennett, Harrison and Millary and they set up a three-room temporary clinic until the hospital finishes building in 1911.

Upon the completion of the construction of the hospital, the dispensary was closed and moved to the hospital, which is a single floor containing an operating room in the middle and six rooms on the sides of the building. The hospital was built to serve both men and women, but soon the missionary doctors realized the nature of Kuwaiti customs and traditions, so they separated women's medical work from men's.

The work of gynecological medicine began in Kuwait with the arrival of the doctor Eleanor Calverley and Khatun Halima on the first of January 1912 and she established her work in the center of the city after allocating her a home for the treatment of women, and she succeeded in performing operations and gynecological treatment of difficult labor and others, and she would go to the patient if the patient's family requested it, which earned her fame and acceptance among Kuwaiti women.

In 1914, Sheikh Mubarak Al-Sabah ordered the expansion of the hospital due to the change in the concept of modern medicine and the acceptance of the Kuwaitis from the treatment provided and the successful operations. The hospital became a reputable one in the Arabian Peninsula and became a destination for treatment, where treatment was carried out outside the Arabian Peninsula, the Deputy Governor of India and the British accredited (Connell Cree) who donated a thousand rupees to build two additional rooms in addition to the doctors visiting the neighboring areas to treat princes and kings at their request from the ruler of Kuwait.

In 1919, the number of medical visits for women increased, so the first women’s hospital in Kuwait was built next to the missionary hospital, where the average building was of one floor, and contained two wings, an operating room and a nurse’s residence, where the first nurse who went to the nurses’ house was Rahmouni.

In 1927, he opened the first private pharmacy in Kuwait under the name Islamic Charitable Pharmacy, where the idea goes back to Abdul Latif bin Ibrahim Al-Duhaim, as it was selling drugs and medicines imported from abroad, as it relied on importing medicines from India, Basra and Baghdad.

== Ministry tasks ==
- Preserving public health by providing preventive, curative and control health services.
- Regulating and supervising health services provided by the public and private sectors.
- Establishing health educational and training institutions and institutes affiliated to the Ministry and supervising their management, taking into account the provisions of the relevant legislation in force.
- Encouraging and promoting healthy lifestyles and behaviors, including physical activities and proper nutrition, and encouraging the prevention of smoking and any other patterns or behaviors that have been scientifically proven to be beneficial in improving health.
- Raising the health level of the population by combating diseases caused by malnutrition by adding micro-nutrients such as iodine, iron, vitamins and the like to foodstuffs, or requiring the modification of their components, and preventing the marketing of foods that pose a threat to health.
- Encouraging and promoting the breastfeeding of children and for this purpose, it has the right to ban any advertising, visual, audio or read means or any means of displaying notes, instructions, identification cards, display boards, pictures, films or merchandise in any form. To advertise breast-milk substitutes and complementary foods. Production, design and dissemination of information and educational materials related to it.
- Maternal and child care by providing the necessary services for the mother and child, including care for the pregnant woman during pregnancy, during childbirth and during the puerperium, monitoring the growth of the child and providing vaccinations, in accordance with the necessary reproductive health requirements and other health affairs related to family planning.
- Those wishing to get married are obligated to conduct the necessary medical examination before marriage. The provisions related to this examination and its conditions are determined by the system issued in accordance with the provisions of this law. It is not permissible to conduct a marriage contract before conducting this examination.
- Providing preventive health services for students in government schools, kindergartens and nurseries.Securing and providing health services as it deems appropriate for some non-governmental schools, kindergartens and nurseries, or obligating their owners to provide these services under the supervision of the Ministry.
- Implementation of programs related to health activities related to the care of the elderly and health supervision of their centers and institutions.
- Monitor the occupational environment and the health of workers in factories, laboratories and industrial facilities to ensure their health safety.
- Implementation of health programs and activities related to combating common non-communicable diseases such as cardiovascular diseases, cancer, diabetes and any other similar diseases that may pose a threat to public health.

== Ministry achievements ==
In recent years, the Ministry of Health has made many achievements, the most important of which are:

- Eradication of polio in recent years thanks to expansion of vaccination coverage to 99.5%.
- The Ministry of Health was able to achieve about 80 percent of the objectives of the Hearing Health Survey Program, which aims to Early detection of hearing impairments, according to what the Minister of Health, Dr. Basil Al-Sabah, indicated during the opening of a conference on the latest developments in laryngeal and vocal cord surgery, pointing out that the comprehensive hearing survey program that was launched in 2013 aims to take remedial measures Rehabilitation and reduction of hearing impairment rates among newborns.
- The Gulf Health Council praised the medical efforts made by the Kuwaiti Ministry of Health and its national cadres in dealing with the emerging corona virus pandemic, as well as conducting several qualitative operations, including installing a stent to expand the thoracic aorta without surgery for a number of critical cases, which contributed to reducing risks for patients. The council added that the Kuwaiti medical staff excelled in performing qualitative and important operations for children with cancer, which consisted of stem cell transplantation by donating marrow and other cases by donating blood and preparing it for the future.
- The International Allergy Organization, which is the largest academy specialized in the field of allergy, chose the Al-Rashid Center for Allergy and Immunology to be a distinguished center with reference in the world. also Al-Rashid Center for Allergy and Immunology has become recognized in the Middle East and Africa.
- At the local level, the Western Sabahiya Center was opened to provide integrated health services to the people of the region, pointing out that it came to achieve the vision of the State of Kuwait to reach sustainable health for all.
- Kuwait’s Ministry of Health has built a robust health sector that can withstand situations that the country is currently facing. In putting together, a strategic response to the COVID-19 pandemic, the MoH has called upon several partners in the wider health sector to play their part. Kuwait Hospital has certainly answered the call and is supporting the State of Kuwait as part of its strong CSR towards the community.

== Ministry objectives ==
The ministry aims to achieve an ambitious strategy for the year 2035, which includes programs to expand hospital beds, accredit Kuwait as a regional center for disease control and prevention, the national program for the accreditation of health services, and reduce the proportion of salt in bread by 20 percent. Health by combating infectious diseases of nuns, training national medical staff, and benefiting from the unified electronic file initiative across 107 primary health centers, 32 specialized hospitals, six general hospitals, and 60 central directorates and offices. Its vision is in line with the seventeen sustainable development goals ( SDGs) for the 2030 Agenda for Sustainable Development, adopted by world leaders in September 2015 at a historic United Nations summit.

The Ministry of Health is working on a project to develop an artificial intelligence-based system that helps them in their work. The goal is to use artificial intelligence to provide medical assistance and support to patients, doctors and nurses. This project is still in the development stage, and this system will focus on three main areas: medical assistance and medical education and medical research.

Through its strategic plan, the Ministry sought to push for the adoption of Kuwait as a regional center for the prevention and response to chronic diseases Especially after the adoption by the World Health Organization, represented by its regional office for the Eastern Mediterranean, for the strategy of the Kuwaiti Ministry of Health to reduce and respond Chronic non-communicable diseases in preparation for declaring Kuwait a regional center.

== List of ministers ==
Name	Took office	Left office
Abdullah Al-Salim Al-Sabah	1936	1952
Fahad Al-Salem Al-Sabah	1952	1959
Sabah Al-Salem Al-Sabah	1959	1961
Abdul Aziz Hamad Al-Saqer	1962	1963
Abdul Latif Thunayan Al-Ghanim	1963	1965
Hamoud Yousef Al-Nisf	1964	1965
Abdulaziz Ibrahim Al-Fulaij	1965	1971
Dr. Abdul Razzaq Mishary Al-Adwani	1971	1975
Dr. Abdul Rahman Al-Awadi	1975	1988
Dr. Abdul-Razzaq Yusuf Al-Abd Al-Razzaq	1988	1990
Dr. Abdulwahab Suleiman Al-Fawzan	1990	1994
Dr. Abdul Rahman Saleh Al Muhailan	1994	1995
Saud Al-Nasir Al-Sabah	1996	1996
Anwar Abdullah Al-Nouri	1996	1997
Dr. Adel Al-Sabeeh	1997	1999
Dr. Muhammad Ahmad Al-Jarallah	1999	2005
Ahmed Fahad Al-Ahmad Al-Sabah	2005	2005
Ahmed Abdullah Al-Ahmad Al-Sabah	2006	2007
Dr. Masooma Saleh Al Mubarak	March 2007	August 2007
Abdullah Saud Al-Muhailbi	August 2007	October 2007
Abdullah Al-Taweel	2007	2008
Ali Al-Barrak	2008	2009
Roudhan Al-Roudhan	2009	2009
Dr. Helal Musaed Al-Sayer	2009	2011
Dr. Muhammad Barak Al-Haifi	2012	2013
Muhammad Abdullah Al-Mubarak Al-Sabah	2013	2014
Dr. Ali Saad Al-Obaidi	2014	2016
Dr. Jamal Al-Harbi	2016	2017
Dr. Basil Hammoud Al-Sabah	2017	2021
Dr. Khaled Al-Saeed	2021	2022
Dr. Ahmed Abdulwahab Al-Awadhi	2022	until now
