= 'Ajam of Kuwait =

Kuwaiti citizens of Iranian descent

Ajam
العيم / فرس الكويت
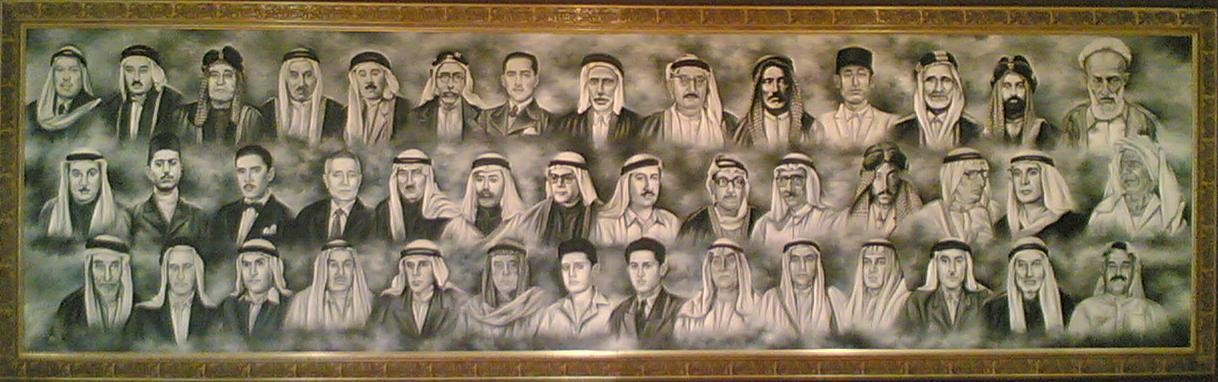
- Marafi family (Persian: معرفي) were among the first Ajam merchant families to settle in Kuwait.

Regions with significant populations
- Kuwait

Languages
- Historic: Kuwaiti Persian; Modern: Kuwaiti Arabic

Religion
- Predominantly Shia Islam; Minority Sunni Islam

Related ethnic groups
- Iranian diaspora (Iranians of UAE • Ajam of Bahrain • Ajam of Qatar • Ajam of Iraq • Iranians of Canada • Iranians of America • Iranians of UK • Iranians of Germany • Iranians of Israel • Iranians in Turkey)

The 'Ajam of Kuwait (Arabic: عيم الكويت), also known as Persian Kuwaitis, are Kuwaiti people of Iranian descent. The majority of Shia Kuwaiti citizens are of Iranian descent, although there are Ajam Kuwaitis who are Sunni.

Since the mid 20th century, the community has experienced marginalisation and exclusion from state heritage narrative. In the mid-to-late 20th century, the term "Ajam" became synonymous with Shia families; which can be partly attributed to the politicization of sectarian identities following the 1979 Iranian revolution.

== Ethnic composition ==
The Ajam community of Kuwait originate from different Iranian ethnic groups including:

- Lurs: from Lorestan province and Bushehr (particularly Ganaveh County).
- Persians
- Iranian Azerbaijanis
- Achomis: such Al-Kandari (Arabic: الكندري) and Al-Awadhi (Arabic: العوضي) clans of Larestani ancestry. (Note: Persian Evaz (عوض) is pronounced "Awadh" in Arabic) They tend to have strong transnational ties to Sunni Ajam families in Bahrain and the UAE (especially Dubai).
- Iranian Balochis (Arabic: البلوشي): Baluch families (Sunni and Shia) first immigrated to Kuwait in the 19th century.
- Iranian Kurds
- Iranian Arabs
- Tarakma (Arabic: تراكمه): They constitute the majority of the Ajams in Kuwait, originating from Lamerd in Fars province.
- Kuwaiti Ajams of Sayyid descent, especially those from the Al-Musawi clan.

== History ==
=== Pre-oil Kuwait ===
==== Kuwait City ====
Historically, Persian ports provided most of pre-oil Kuwait's economic needs. Marafi Behbehani was one of the first merchants to settle in Kuwait in the 18th century. The arms trade was exclusively under the domain of Ajam merchants.

Up until the 1950s, most Ajam (both Sunni and Shia) resided in the Sharq historical district in the old Kuwait City, thereby forming a linguistic enclave which preserved the Kuwaiti Persian language for generations. They communicated in Persian between each other, and did not frequently mingle with Arabic speakers until the oil-led industrialisation of Kuwait City which scattered people to the suburbs. The linguistic enclave was not present any longer therefore the Ajam had to learn Kuwaiti Arabic to survive in the new environment.

In the pre-oil era, the Ajam introduced many new things to Kuwaiti society. For instance, the first hotel in Kuwait City was built by Yusuf Behbehani; the first telephone in Kuwait was brought by M. Ma’arafie; the first radio agency in Kuwait was established by M. Ma’arafie in 1935; and the first refrigerator in Kuwait was imported by M. Ma’arafie in 1934. Murad Behbehani was the first person to officially introduce television to Kuwait. He was the founder of Kuwait Television (KTV) before the company was nationalized by the government.

==== Failaka Island ====
The majority of Kuwaitis from Failaka Island are of Iranian ancestry. They originally migrated to Failaka from the Iranian coast, mainly Kharg Island and Bandar Lengeh. These people are commonly known as the Huwala in the GCC states. They are predominantly Sunni Muslims and speak Arabic fluently, although prior to the discovery of oil they also spoke Persian fluently. The most important Huwala settlement in Failaka Island pertained to 40 families who migrated from the Iranian island Kharg to Failaka in the years 1841–1842. The most recent settlement occurred in the early 1930s after the imposition of the unveiling law by Reza Shah. A minority of Failaka Island's Kuwaiti families are Shia Persians, they were noted as having their own husayniyyas and the older generations were frequent Arabic speakers, unlike the Kuwaiti Shia of Persian descent in Kuwait City at the time.

=== Modern era ===
Although present-day Kuwaiti citizens are ethnically diverse (consisting of both Arabs and Ajam), the cultural identity of Ajam is suppressed and marginalized. Since the mid 20th century, the Ajam have experienced marginalisation and exclusion from state heritage narrative.

In the 1950s, approximately 40–50,000 of older generations of Persian immigrants found it necessary to adopt Kuwaiti citizenship to keep their economic stronghold in Kuwait. By doing so, the Marafi and Behbahani family maintained substantial economic influence in the country. In the 1960s, the Ajam community was subjected to xenophobic hate campaigns by Arab nationalists.

The community was also affected by Saddam Hussein during the Iran–Iraq War and especially the Iraqi invasion of Kuwait when many fled to Iran, while others experienced increased Kuwaiti nationalism and assimilated, and the Persian language also declined in Kuwait at the same time.

Some Ajam are stateless. In 2019, the Iranian embassy announced that it is ready to offer Iranian citizenship to stateless people of Iranian descent in Kuwait.

==== Language shift ====
The anti-preservation attitude of the Kuwaiti government towards the Kuwaiti Persian language will eventually lead to the disappearance of the language in Kuwaiti society, as Abdulmuhsen Dashti projects. The government of Kuwait tries to delegitimise the use of the language in as many domains as possible.

In 2008, the Kuwaiti writer Waleed Al-Rujaib was criticised for releasing a novel set in the 1960s featuring the community's Persian language and culture, Al-Rujaib considered the backlash a testament to "blind hatred for all those who are different from us". The Kuwaiti television series Karimo attempted to address the identity crisis of Kuwaitis of Iranian descent. The show featured Kuwaiti actors speaking fluent Persian; which resulted in some racist discourse against the Ajam community. The Alrai TV channel advertised the show in Farsi and Arabic.

In 2009, it was estimated that 89% of Kuwaiti Ajam aged 40–70 spoke Persian fluently as their native language; whereas only 28% of Kuwaiti Ajam aged 12–22 spoke Persian. Cultural, political, and economic marginalization creates a strong incentive for Kuwaiti Ajam to abandon their language in favor of Arabic which is widely perceived as a more prestigious language. This happens because Kuwaiti Ajam families want to achieve a higher social status, have a better chance to get employment and/or acceptance in a given social network so they adopt the cultural and linguistic traits of socially dominant groups with enough power imbalance to culturally integrate them, through various means of ingroup and outgroup coercion. The generation of Kuwaiti Ajam born between 1983 and 1993 are reported to have a minimal proficiency in their language unlike the older generations of Kuwaiti Ajam. Since the 1980s and 1990s, many Kuwaiti Ajam parents have reported an unwillingness to pass the Persian language on to their children, as it will hurdle their integration into the dominant culture. The Ajam feel pressure to abandon ties that could be interpreted as showing belonging to Iran, as Persian is synonymous with Iranian, and the Persian language is actually called Irani in Kuwaiti Arabic. In several interviews conducted by PhD student Batoul Hasan, Ajam youth have shown hesitation to use or learn Persian due to stigmatisation and prejudice in Kuwait.

In 2012, MP Muhammad Hassan al-Kandari called for a "firm legal action" against an advertisement for teaching the Persian language in Rumaithiya.

UNESCO recognise Kuwaiti Persian as an endangered language. The decline of Kuwaiti Persian is a reflection of the forced homogeneity of Kuwait's national identity and marginalisation of ethnic, linguistic and cultural diversity among Kuwaiti citizens. Unlike Bahrain and Dubai where the Ajam citizens still speak their language (including the youngest generations).

== Culture ==
The Ajam of Kuwait have retained certain cultural traditions and idiosyncrasies that differentiate them from other ethnic groups in Kuwaiti society. Waleed Al-Rujaib's 2008 novel "Mustique" focuses on their culture in the 1960s.

=== Cuisine ===
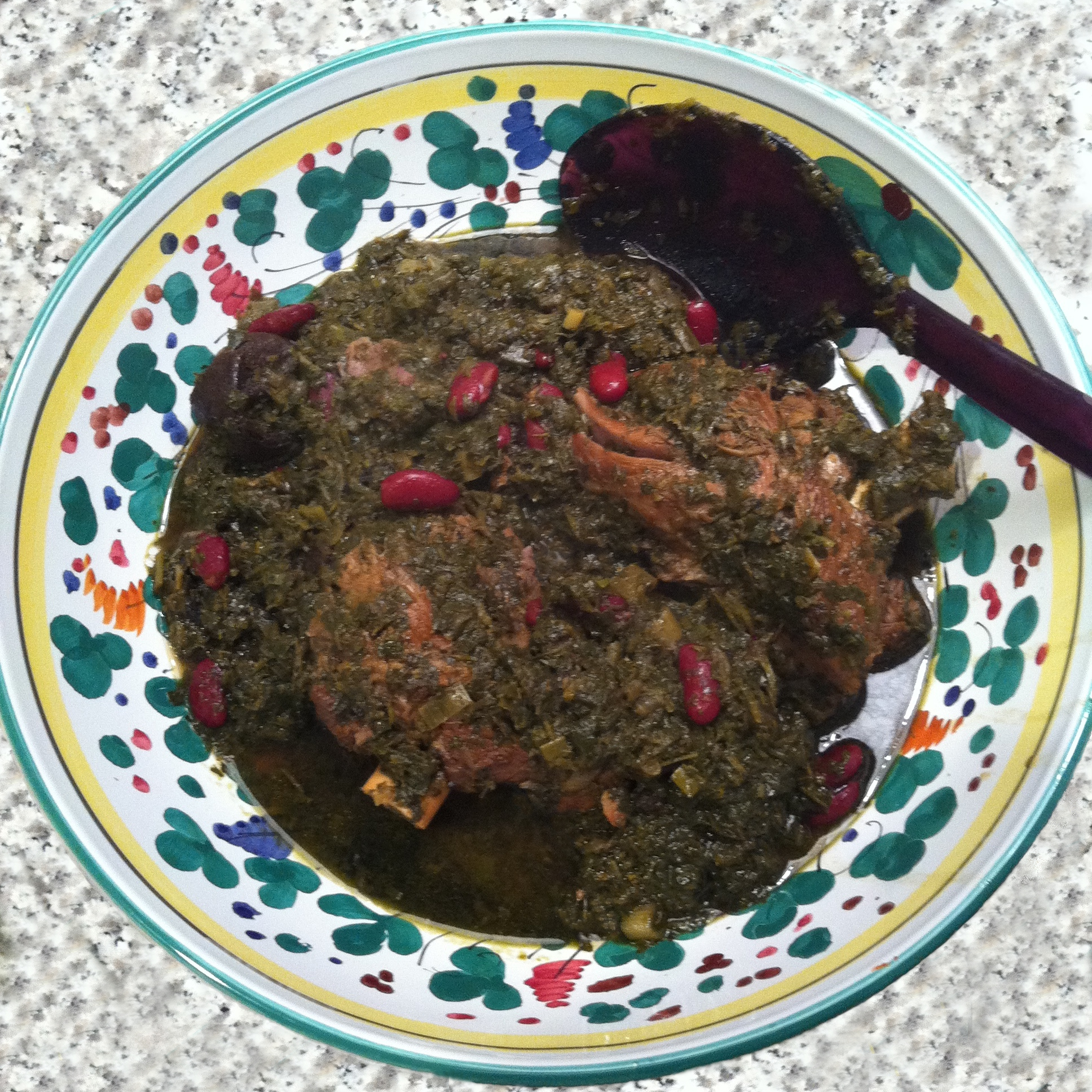
Marag sabzi is a common meal in the homes of Kuwaiti Ajam families.

The Ajam community has unique culinary traditions such as marag sabzi, mahyawa, nakhi, and bajella. The Ajam are particularly known for bread-making especially Iranian bread. The Iranian zubaidi fish is a staple food. Various other Ajam food items are derived from modern Iranian cuisine, especially desserts, sweets, and snacks.

=== Music ===
The Ajam of Kuwait are known for the habbān, which is a type of bagpipe used in southern Iran and the coastal regions of the Persian Gulf. In the 1990s and 2000s, the Kuwaiti record label Al-Nazaer released various music in the Kuwaiti Persian language. Even some non-Ajam Kuwaiti musicians have released music in the Kuwaiti Persian language, such as the Miami Band (Ferqat Miami).

=== Qiddu ===
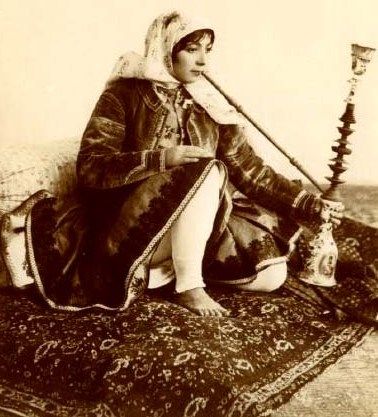
Iranian woman smoking traditional Qalyoon

Qiddu (Persian: گِدو, romanized: Giddu) is a smoking method very similar to Iranian hookah (Persian: قلیان, romanized: Qalyoon), there is no honeydew added to it, and its base is made of pottery (not glass). Historically, both men and women smoked qiddu. Unlike the restrictive gender norms of Arabia, smoking qiddu has always been socially acceptable among Ajam women.

=== Religion ===
The majority of Shia Kuwaiti citizens are of Iranian descent. Ajam Shia have distinct cultural beliefs, customs, and rituals; which can be exemplified by the stark contrast between Sunni and Shia graves at the national cemetery of Kuwait.

Many Kuwaitis of Iranian descent are Sunni Muslims such as the Al-Kandari and Al-Awadhi (Note: Persian Evaz "عوض" is pronounced "Awadh" in Arabic) families of Larestani ancestry. They tend to have strong transnational ties to Sunni Ajam families in Bahrain and the UAE (especially Dubai). Iranian Balochi families (Sunni and Shia) first immigrated to Kuwait in the 19th century.

In the pre-oil era, the term Ajam pertained to both Sunni and Shia families of Iranian descent in Kuwait. However, the Sunni Ajam generally did not identify with the Shia ones. In the 20th century, the term Ajam became synonymous with Shia families; which can be partly attributed to the politicization of sectarian identities following the 1979 Iranian revolution.

=== Language ===
The Kuwaiti Persian language is a combination of different varieties of the Persian language and Achomi language historically spoken in Kuwait. It was passed down through generations in the historical Sharq district of Kuwait City. Husseiniyat Marafi is among the oldest husseiniyas in Kuwait, as it was founded in 1905, and reading there was initially in the Persian language.

Nowadays, the Ajam speak Kuwaiti Arabic but it is believed they incorrectly pronounce various Kuwaiti words. Consequently, there is an Ajami accent of Kuwaiti Arabic, which is sometimes a subject of mockery in the media. Most recently, the media personality Fajer Al-Saeed mockingly imitated the Ajami accent of Hassan Jawhar.

The Iranian sub-dialects of Larestani, Khonji, Bastaki and Gerashi have influenced the vocabulary of Kuwaiti Arabic.

=== Famous families ===
- Maʿrafi (Arabic: معرفي Persian: معرفي)
- Bin Ghalib (Arabic: بن غالب Persian: غالب)
- Behbehani (Arabic: بهبهاني Persian: بهبهاني)
- Bushehri (Arabic: بوشهري Persian: بوشهري)
- Bastaki/Al-Bastaki (Arabic: بستكي/البستكي Persian: بستكي)
- Baluch/Al-Balushi (Arabic: البلوشي Persian: بلوشي)
- Mulla Hussain (Arabic: ملا حسين Persian: ملاحسين)
- Kandari (Arabic: كندري Persian: كندري)
- Al-Awadhi (Arabic: العوضي Persian: عوضي)

== Notable people ==
- Ahmed Mousa Mirza, footballer
- Abbas Almohri, religious scholar
- Ali Maqseed, footballer
- Abdulhussain Abdulredha, actor
- Abdulghaphor Hajjieh, economist and politician
- Ahmed Lari, politician
- Abdul-Hamid Dashti, lawyer and politician
- Abbas Qali, Olympics athlete
- Ahmad Abdulghafour, footballer
- Adnan Zahid Abdulsamad, politician
- Ali al-Ihqaqi, religious scholar
- Ali Abdulreda, footballer
- Ahmad Johar, actor
- Abdullah Al-Buloushi, footballer
- Abdulaziz Al-Buloushi, footballer
- Bashar al-Shatti, singer-songwriter of Star Academy fame
- Dawood Marafie, economist and politician
- Emma Shah, singer
- Ghadeer Aseeri, politician
- Halema Boland, television host and entertainer
- Hassan Jawhar, politician
- Hussain Al-Musawi, footballer
- Hamed Sadeq, sprinter
- Halema Boland, television host and entertainer
- Hamad al-Naqi, activist and blogger
- Ibtihal Al-Khatib, secular academic
- Jenan Boushehri, politician
- Kazem Behbehani, immunologist and retired professor, World Health Organization official
- Lara Dashti, Olympics athlete
- Mahdi Dashti, professional soccer player
- Mohammad Al-Mosawi, Olympics athlete
- Mohammad Ashkanani, professional basketball player
- Mahmoud Dashti, footballer
- Mohammad Murad, award-winning wildlife photographer
- Mohammed Karam, footballer
- Muhammad Baqir al-Muhri, an ayatollah
- Mashari Al-Ballam, actor
- Mohamed Jarragh, footballer
- Mai Al Balushi, actress
- Najeeba Hayat, luxury footwear designer
- Nasser Abul, online activist
- Rola Dashti, politician
- Rawan bin Hussain, actress, singer, and social media influencer
- Sulaiman Qabazard, 1976 Olympics diver
- Samir Said, footballer
- Sami Al-Lanqawi, footballer
- Sara Akbar, co-founder and former chief executive officer of Kuwait Energy
- Shehab Kankoune, footballer
- Saleh Ashour, politician
- Sarah Behbehani, tennis player
- Sami Al-Lanqawi, footballer
- Sulaiman Abdulghafour, footballer
- Thuraya Al-Baqsami, modern artist and writer
- Yasser Al-Habib, religious cleric
- Zahra Marwan, award-winning artist and writer
- Zaid Ashkanani, racing driver
- Mahmood Bushehri, Iranian actor living in Kuwait (Kuwaiti mother).

== Gallery ==
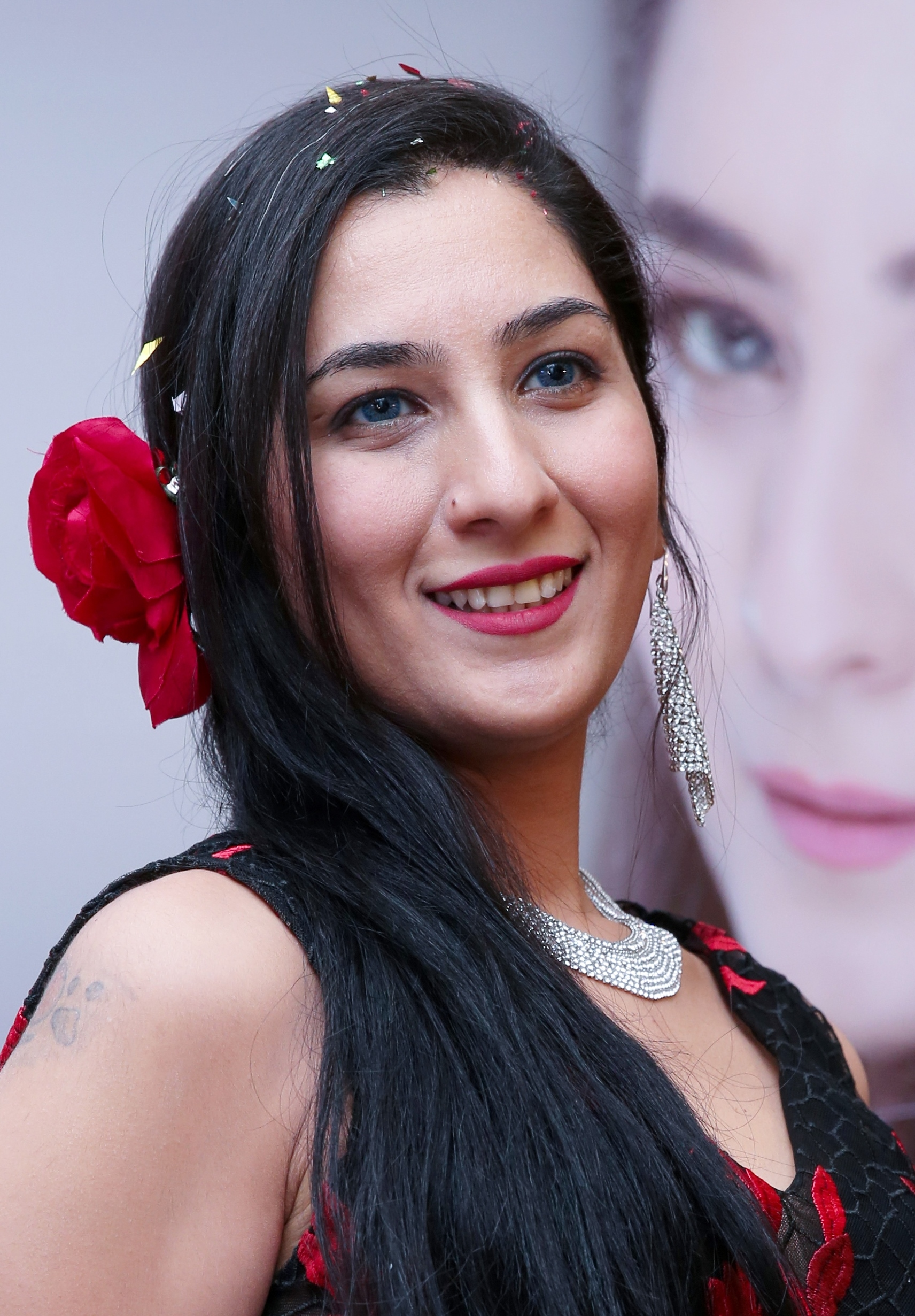
Ema Shah

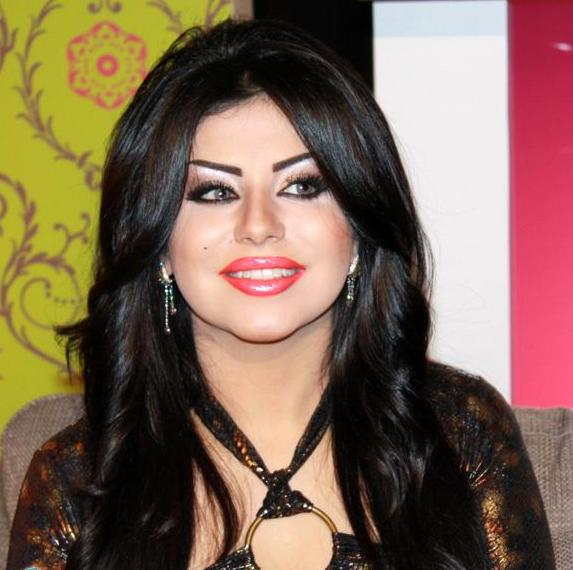
Halema Boland

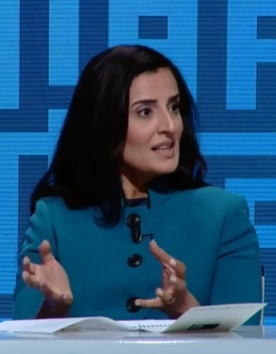
Ibtihal Al-Khatib

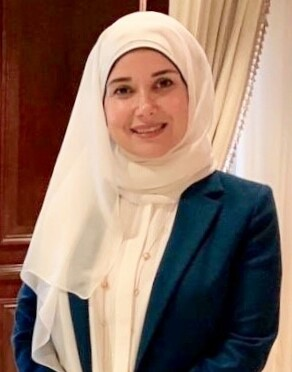
Jenan Boushehri

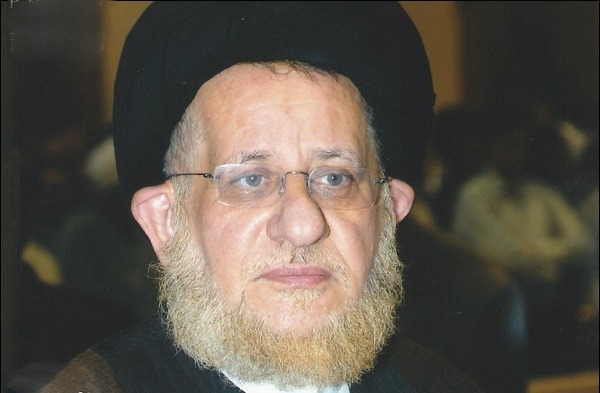
Ayotallah Muhammad Baqir al-Muhri

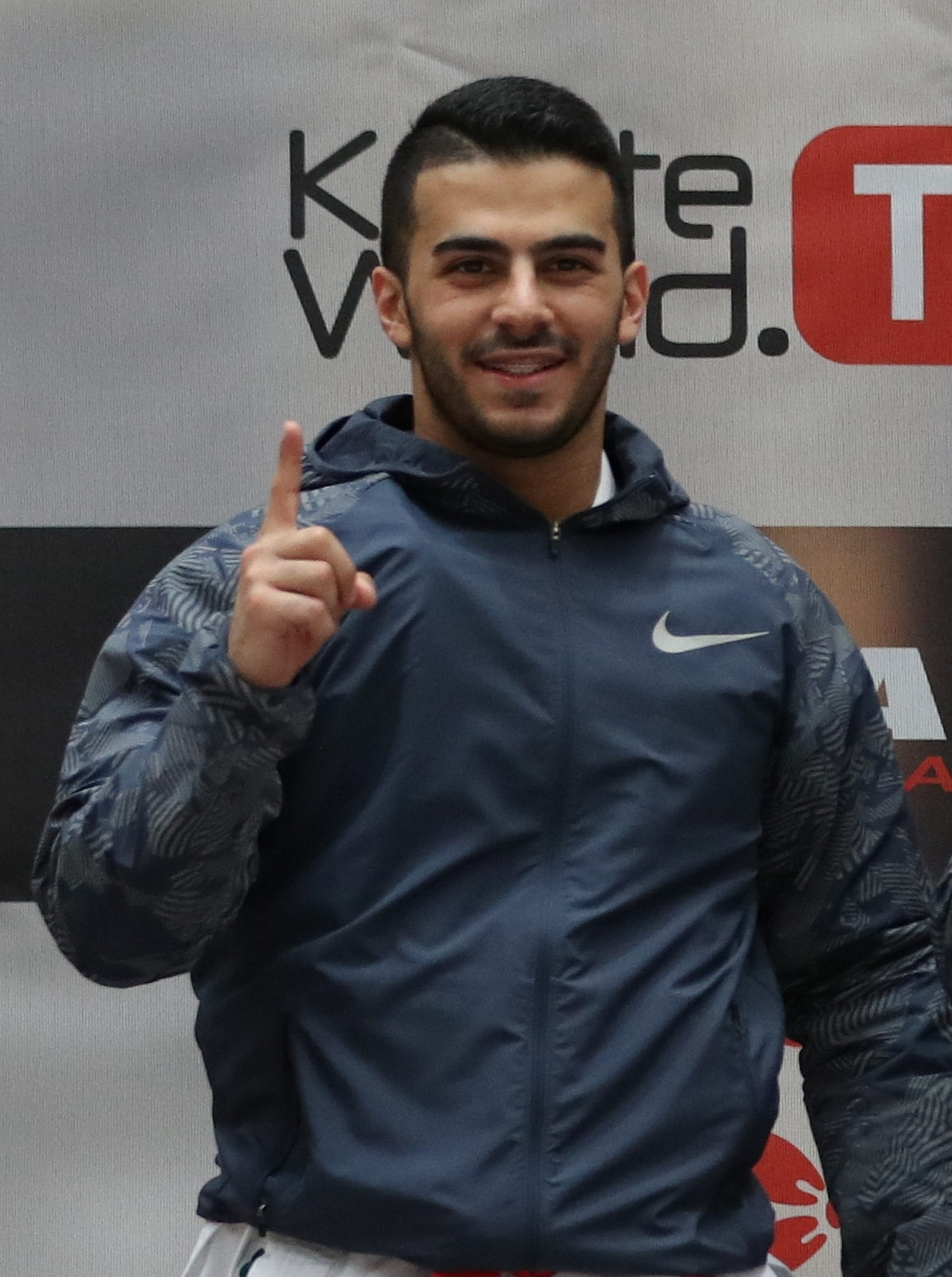
Mohamed Al Mosawi

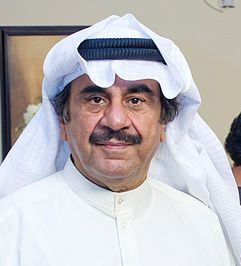
Abdulhussain Abdulreza

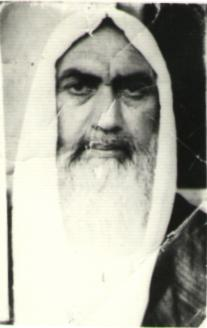
Mirza Ali Mousa Ihqaqi

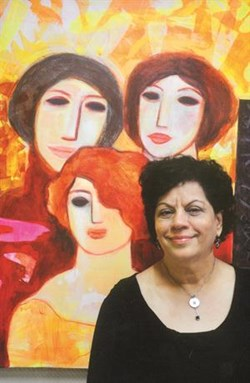
Thuraya Baqsami

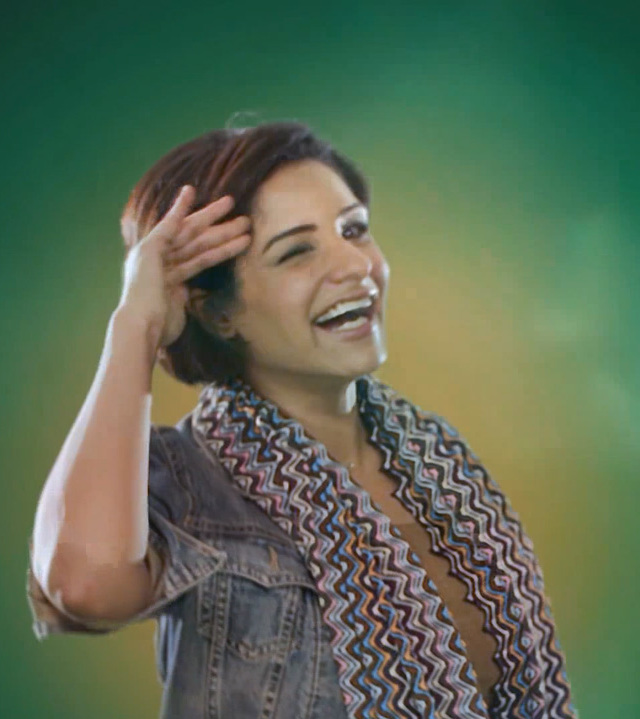
Maram Balushi/Baluchi

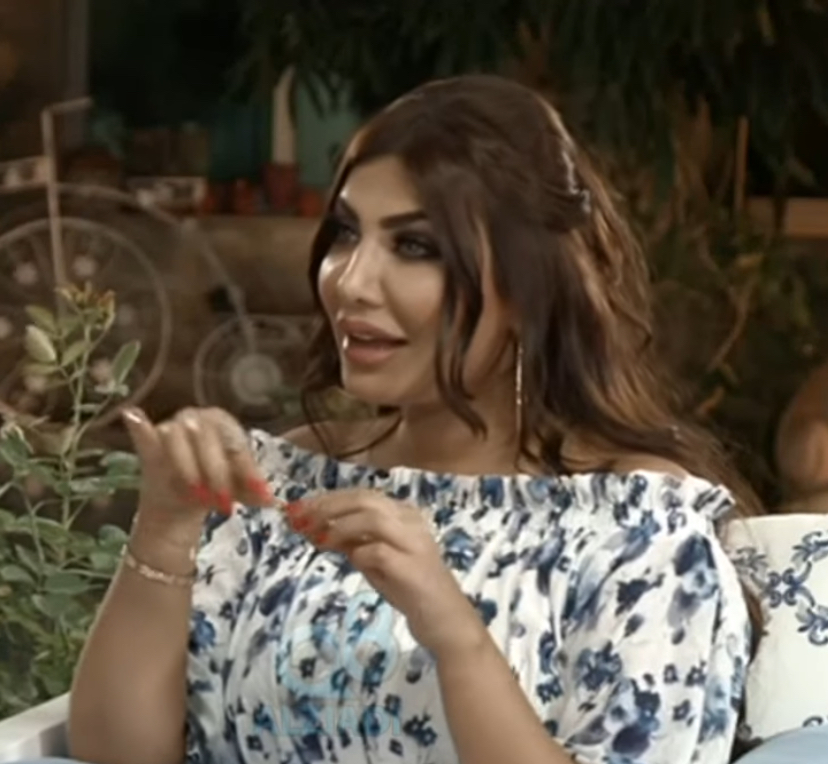
Amal Al-Awadhi

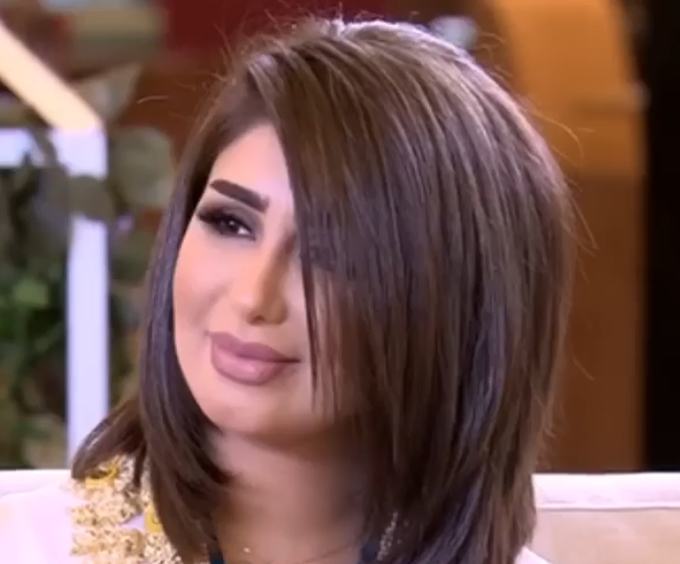
Hanady Al-Kandari

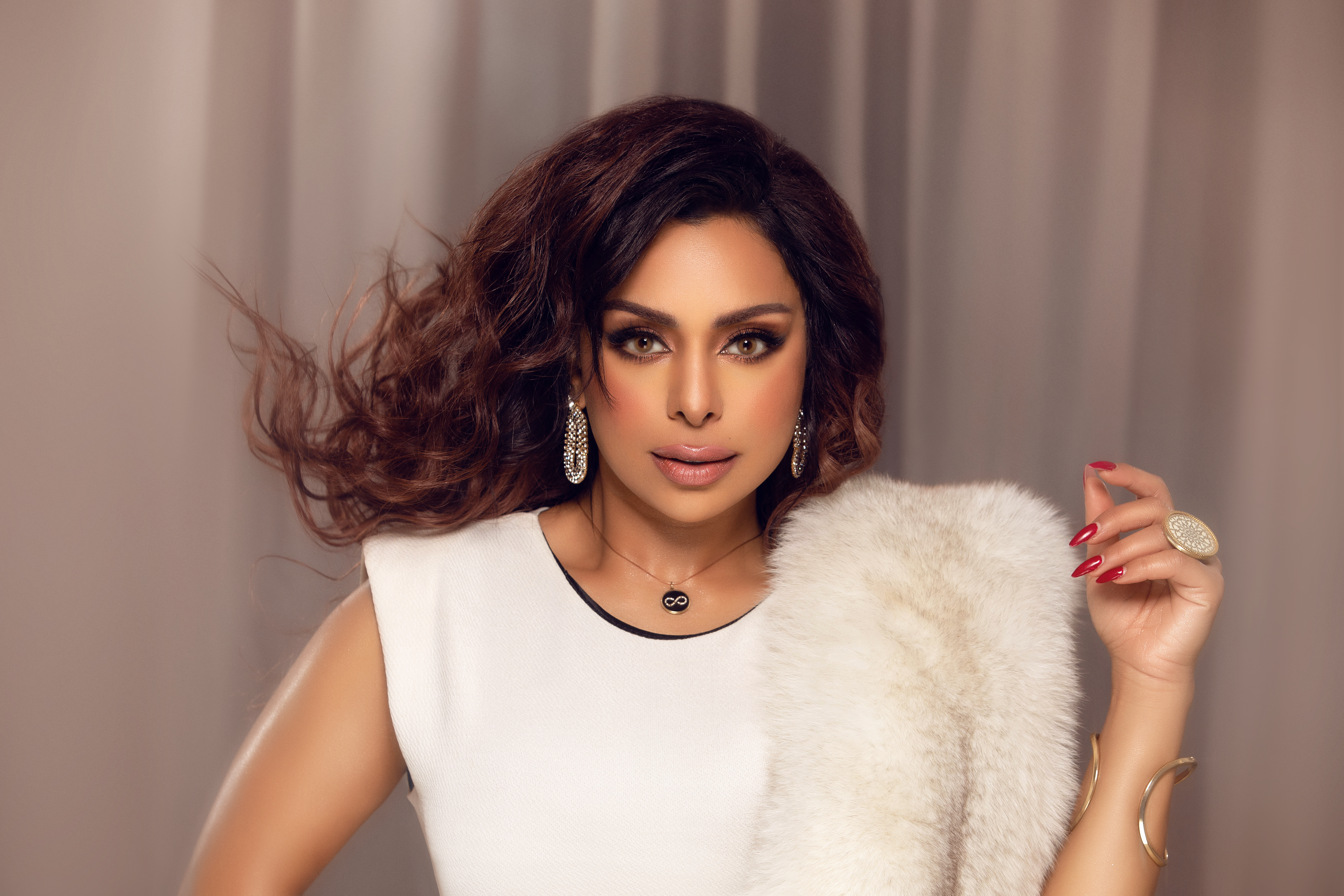
Hind Al-Balushi

== See also ==
- Iran–Kuwait relations
- Iranian diaspora
- Expatriates in Kuwait
