= Kuwaiti Americans =

Ethnic group in America

Total population
- 25,735

Regions with significant populations
- California, Arizona, Colorado, Florida, Illinois, Pennsylvania and West Virginia

Languages
- American English, Kuwaiti Arabic, Kuwaiti Persian

Religion
- Islam, Christianity, atheism

Kuwaiti Americans (Arabic: كويتيون أمريكيون) are an ethnic group of citizens or residents of the United States with total or partial ancestry from Kuwaiti descent.

== Demographics ==
As of 2019 there are over 14,000 Kuwaiti students studying at universities across the U.S. Kuwaiti Students have created communities in certain cities or states. States like California (in cities such as Fresno), Arizona, Colorado, Florida, Illinois, Pennsylvania and West Virginia have large Kuwaiti student populations.

Population estimates are seen to have a very small diaspora, mainly because Kuwait provides its citizens with more than adequate welfare benefits and Kuwait is one of the wealthiest countries in the world, removing the need for Kuwaiti citizens to live and work in developed Western countries. However, some Kuwaiti Americans originate from the stateless community in Kuwait.

== Organizations ==
The government of Kuwait and other prominent individuals and organizations in Kuwait support Kuwaiti students in the United States through NUKS, the National Union of Kuwaiti Students. This association, among other things, organizes and sponsors activities for students from entire U.S., says the concerns and problems of the Kuwaiti students in United States to Kuwaiti authorities and helps to students, especially freshmen, to adapt to the American life. The students vote by his representatives, many of them in the same place. There are usually two parties between which the students can vote: Al-Wihda (United) and Al Mustaqbal Al Tulaby (Student Future). Although both parties work for send to largest number of Kuwaiti students to United States, Student Future is a conservative party that aims to strengthen, among students, the idea of keeping religion and traditions, having even an own magazine, while that United is a liberal party that supports the integration of students in American society.

Other Kuwaiti American association is the Kuwait-America Foundation (KAF), established in Washington D.C. in 1991. The association is inspired in the fight for Kuwait's liberation, that was exerted by Allied Coalition forces in the Gulf War. The association is grateful for the American help during the Gulf War and reinforces ties among the two countries. However, the association mainly is dedicated on education, cultural exchange and programs for youth and disadvantaged persons.

== Notable people ==
- Zahra Marwan
- Dina Al-Sabah

== See also ==
- Kuwait–United States relations
