= Kuwaiti Persian =

Persian variety historically spoken in Kuwait

- عیمی ʿĪmi
- Native to: Kuwait
- Ethnicity: 'Ajam of Kuwait
- Language family: Indo-European: Indo-Iranian; Iranian; Western Iranian; Southwestern; Persian; Iranian Persian; Kuwaiti Persian

Language codes
- ISO 639-3: None (mis)
- Glottolog: None

Kuwaiti Persian, known in Kuwait as ʿīmi (sometimes spelled Eimi) (Note: Written in Arabic alphabet as "عيمي", and pronounced /ʕi:mi/ in Kuwaiti Arabic and /[ʔ]i:mi:/ in Kuwaiti Persian. Sometimes it is also referred to as ايراني "Iranian", but this could refer to the Persian language as well.)) is a combination of different varieties of the Persian language and Achomi language historically spoken in Kuwait. Kuwaiti Persian has been spoken for generations, especially in the historical Sharq district of Kuwait City, where Iranian families had settled.

In 2009, it was estimated that 89% of Kuwaiti Ajam aged 40–70 spoke Persian fluently as their native language; whereas only 28% of Kuwaiti Ajam aged 12–22 spoke Persian. UNESCO recognise Kuwaiti Persian as an endangered language.

== History ==
The Ajam (ʕɐjɐm) is an ethnic group in Kuwait composed of Kuwaiti citizens of Iranian descent. Historically, Persian ports provided most of pre-oil Kuwait's economic needs. The Ajam spoke a variety of dialects and sub-dialects. This mixture came to be called ʿīmi ([language] of the Ajam), over generations and generations, whereby the variety of Kuwaiti Persian developed. Husseiniyat Marafi is among the oldest husseiniyas in Kuwait, as it was founded in 1905, and reading there was initially in the Persian language.

Up until the 1950s, most Ajam (both Sunni and Shia) resided in the Sharq historical district in the old Kuwait City, thereby forming a linguistic enclave which preserved the language for generations. They communicated in Persian between each other, and did not frequently mingle with Arabic speakers until the oil-led industrialisation of Kuwait City which scattered people to the suburbs. The linguistic enclave was not present any longer therefore the Ajam had to learn Kuwaiti Arabic to survive in the new environment.

It is believed the Ajam community incorrectly pronounce various Kuwaiti Arabic words. There is an Ajami accent of Kuwaiti Arabic, which is sometimes a subject of mockery in the media. Most recently, the media personality Fajer Al-Saeed mockingly imitated the Ajami accent of Hassan Jawhar. The Middle Persian (Achomi) sub-dialects of Larestani, Khonji, Bastaki and Gerashi have influenced the vocabulary of Kuwaiti Arabic.

== Vocabulary ==
Kuwaiti Persian has no official status and it is not standardised. As a koiné language, Kuwaiti Persian is often seen as a "childish" patois by the public.

Below is a table the compares some words in Kuwaiti and Standard Persian, as collected by Batoul Hasan. Some changes seen in Kuwaiti Persian are also common in other non-standard Persian dialects in Iran as well.

English word	In Iranian Standard Persian	In Kuwaiti Persian
Lunch	/næhɒ:r/	/t͡ʃas/
Nose	/bi:ni:/ or /dumɒ:q/	/pu:z/
Mum/Mom	/mɒ:mɒ:n/	/daja:/
Pretty	/qæʃæŋ/	/qæʃæŋin/
Beautiful	/xoʃgil/	/qæʃæŋin/
Dinner	/ʃɒ:m/	/ʃu:m/
Come (imperative)	/bijɒ:/	/bijow/
It is cold	/særde/	/sardin/
What's wrong with him/her	/t͡ʃite/	/t͡ʃiʃin/
Excuse me/sorry	/bibæxʃid/	/bibaxʃin/
That boy	/un pesæar/	/pisaru/
That girl	/un du:xtær/	/duxtaru/
One	/jek/	/jak/
cheap	/ærzɒ:n/	/arzu:n/
water	/ɒ:b/	/ow/
Oh God	/aj xodɒ:/	/ja xuda/

== Music ==
In the 1990s and 2000s, the Kuwaiti record label Al-Nazaer released various music in the Kuwaiti Persian language. Even some non-Ajam Kuwaiti musicians have released music in the Kuwaiti Persian language, such as the Miami Band (Ferqat Miami).

== Discrimination ==
According to Kuwait University professor Abdulmuhsen Dashti, the anti-preservation attitude of the Kuwaiti government towards the Persian language will eventually lead to the disappearance of the language in Kuwaiti society. The government of Kuwait tries to delegitimise the use of the language in as many domains as possible.

In 2008, the Kuwaiti writer Waleed Al-Rujaib was criticised for releasing a novel set in the 1960s featuring the Ajam community's Persian language and culture, Al-Rujaib considered the backlash a testament to "blind hatred for all those who are different from us". The Kuwaiti television series Karimo attempted to address the identity crisis of Kuwaitis of Iranian descent. The show featured Kuwaiti actors speaking fluent Persian; which resulted in some racist discourse against the Ajam community. The Alrai TV channel advertised the show in Persian and Arabic.

In 2009, it was estimated that 89% of Kuwaiti Ajam aged 40–70 spoke Persian fluently as their native language; whereas only 28% of Kuwaiti Ajam aged 12–22 spoke Persian. Cultural, political, and economic marginalization creates a strong incentive for Kuwaiti Ajam to abandon their language in favor of Arabic which is widely perceived as a more prestigious language. This happens because Kuwaiti Ajam families want to achieve a higher social status, have a better chance to get employment and/or acceptance in a given social network so they adopt the cultural and linguistic traits of socially dominant groups with enough power imbalance to culturally integrate them, through various means of ingroup and outgroup coercion. The generation of Kuwaiti Ajam born between 1983 and 1993 are reported to have a minimal proficiency in their language unlike the older generations of Kuwaiti Ajam. Since the 1980s and 1990s, many Kuwaiti Ajam parents have reported an unwillingness to pass the Persian language on to their children, as it will hurdle their integration into the dominant culture. The Ajam feel pressure to abandon ties that could be interpreted as showing belonging to Iran, as Persian is synonymous with Iranian, and the Persian language is actually called Iranian in Kuwaiti Arabic. In several interviews conducted by PhD student Batoul Hasan, Ajam youth have shown hesitation to use or learn Persian due to stigmatisation and prejudice in Kuwait.

In 2012, MP Muhammad Hassan al-Kandari called for a "firm legal action" against an advertisement for teaching the Persian language in Rumaithiya.

UNESCO recognise Kuwaiti Persian as an endangered language. The decline of Kuwaiti Persian is a reflection of the forced homogeneity of Kuwait's national identity and marginalisation of ethnic, linguistic and cultural diversity among Kuwaiti citizens. Unlike Bahrain and Dubai where the Ajam citizens still speak their language (including the youngest generations).

== Education ==
Standard Persian is currently taught at various institutes in Kuwait, including academic institutes, such as Kuwait University, diplomatic cultural institutes, such as the Iranian Embassy cultural office, language institutes, such as Berlitz, and religious institutes, such as Al-Imam Al-Mujtaba seminaries.

In the educated elite circle, standard Persian is seen as a language with high cultural value. According to an Iranian cultural advisor to Kuwait, Khameyar said that a lot of Kuwaitis speak Persian proudly. He also added that many state officials carry conversations in Persian; including non-Ajam Kuwaitis who speak and answer in Persian with embassy officials. Khameyar also expressed his surprise from the reception their Persian language courses had received.

== See also ==
- Achomi language
- Tarakma: Also called Lamerd, the ancestral homeland of many Ajam.
