= Iran–Kuwait relations =

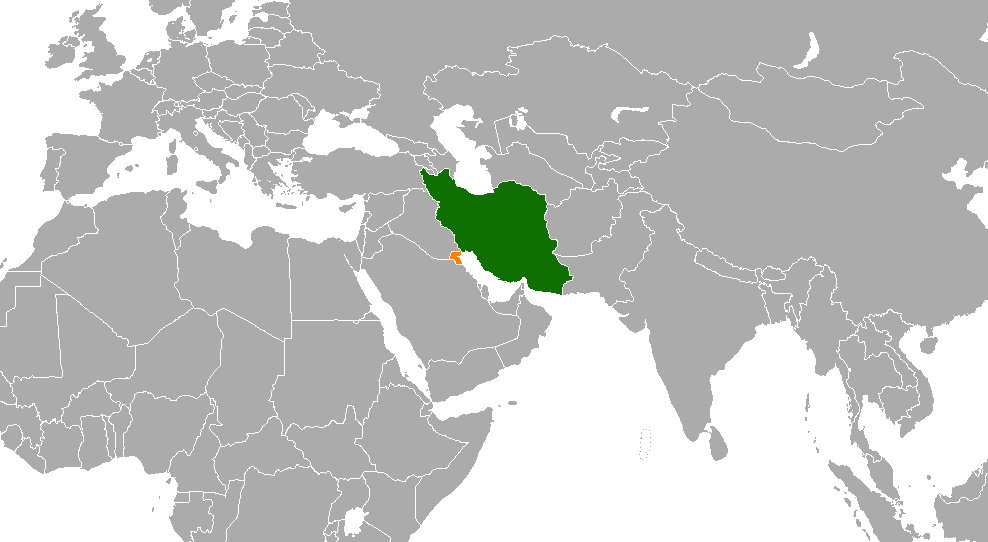

- Iran: Kuwait

Diplomatic mission
- Embassy of Iran, Kuwait City: Embassy of Kuwait, Tehran

Envoy
- Ambassador Mohammad Totonchi: Ambassador Bader Abdullah Al-Munaikh

Kuwait and Iran have longstanding historical ties spanning hundreds of years, particularly in the pre-oil era. Relations were negatively influenced by the Iranian Revolution in 1979 and the Iran–Iraq War in the 1980s. Relations improved after the Iraqi invasion of Kuwait.

== 20th century ==
Historically, Kuwait had close political, economic, and cultural ties to Iran. In 1961, Kuwait became an independent country. In the 1980s, Kuwait sided with Iraq during the Iran–Iraq War. As a result, Iranian–Kuwaiti relations were damaged and Iran had placed Kuwaiti ships, including tankers, under attack. Kuwait's relations with Iran later improved when Iran denounced Iraq for invading Kuwait in the Gulf War at 1991.

== Recent history ==
Iran's foreign policy shifted with the election of more hardline Ahmadinejad in 2005, negatively influenced its relationship with the international community. Things improved when Hassan Rouhani came to power in 2013. In 2014, Kuwait Foreign Undersecretary Khaled Al-Jarallah said it is keen on developing "excellent and historical" relationship with Iran.

According to the US government, Kuwait is concerned about Iranian regional ambitions in Iraq, Syria, and Lebanon. However, Kuwait continues to maintain friendly relations with Iran. In 2018, after U.S. President Donald Trump announced the United States withdrawal from the Iran nuclear deal Kuwait opted to maintain formal ties with Iran while Saudi Arabia, Bahrain, and the United Arab Emirates voiced strong support for the withdrawal. Previously Kuwait declined to follow Saudi Arabia's lead in severing diplomatic relations following the 2016 attack on the Saudi diplomatic missions in Iran.

In 2018, Kuwait's announced plans for economic development, such as the "Silk City project", includes developing mutually beneficial economic ties with Iran (similar to Iran's current economic ties with Dubai of the United Arab Emirates).

During the outbreak of the COVID-19 pandemic in 2020, Kuwait provided US$10 million in humanitarian aid to Iran.

On March 26, 2022, Iran said that an agreement signed by Saudi Arabia and Kuwait to develop the Durra gas field was "illegal" since Tehran has a stake in the field and must be included in any move to operate and develop it.

On April 13, 2022, Saudi Arabia and Kuwait invited Iran to conduct talks on Wednesday to define the eastern border of a combined, energy-rich offshore area, according to the Saudi state news agency SPA.

On July 27, 2023, Kuwait's Oil minister Saad Al Barrak announced plans to begin drilling for gas without first signing an agreement with Iran.

On August 3, 2023, In an escalating feud with Iran, Kuwait along with Saudi Arabia announced that they have “exclusive ownership” of the natural resources in the disputed Durra offshore gas field. Iranian Oil Minister Javad Owji stressed that Tehran will pursue its rights over the Durra-Arash gas field if there is “no willingness” from the other side to “reach an understanding.” The same day Kuwaiti Foreign Minister Salem Abdullah al-Jaber Al-Sabah received an official invite to Iran during a meeting with Mohammad Totonchi, the Gulf state’s newly appointed Iranian ambassador. It is expected that the upcoming visit will center around de-escalating tensions over the gas field.

On 6 August 2026, Kuwaiti authorities ordered the closure of the country's only Iranian school in the wake of the Iranian attacks on Kuwait during the 2026 Iran war.

== 2026 Iranian strikes on Kuwait ==
In 2026, Iran fired retaliatory missiles and drones at Gulf states including Kuwait, as part of the Iran-Israel-United States conflict. On 28 February, the Kuwait International Airport and nearby military facilities were struck by Iranian drones, causing damage and prompting defensive evacuations. Kuwaiti airspace was closed and air defenses were put on high alert.

On 1 March, Kuwait's air defenses intercepted large waves of Iranian ballistic missiles and drones. Some debris and falling shards from interceptions caused injuries and damage in civilian areas; official figures include up to one civilian killed and 37 injured. Smoke and explosions were reported near the U.S. Embassy in Kuwait City after Iranian launches, prompting condemnation from Kuwait's Foreign Ministry. Kuwait condemned the Iranian strikes and emphasized they violated international law and Kuwaiti sovereignty.

The strikes against Kuwait, and other Gulf nations, are part of a plan Khamenei designed before his death, ordering that in the case of war with the United States and Israel, Iran will cause regional chaos across the Middle East, with the purpose of pushing their Gulf neighbors to pressure for a halt to the attacks on Iran.

During the ceasefire, Kuwait's Ministry of Interior reported an incident in which four Islamic Revolutionary Guard Corps that tried to enter Bubiyan Island and injured a Kuwaiti soldier while doing so. On June 3, the airport was once again attacked by a drone, killing 1 and injuring 63.

On 17 July, Kuwait's Ministry of Electricity, Water and Renewable Energy stated that Iranian strikes caused damage to a power plant and a desalination facility in the country, local media outlets reported.

== Ajam citizens ==
'Ajam of Kuwait (Persians of Kuwait) are Kuwaiti citizens of Iranian origin. Historically, Persian ports provided most of Kuwait's economic needs. Marafi Behbahani was one of the first Iranian merchants to settle in Kuwait in the 18th century.

Most Shia Kuwaiti citizens are of Iranian ancestry. However, many Kuwaitis of Iranian origin are Sunni Muslims such as the Al-Kandari and Awadhi families of Larestani ancestry. Some Kuwaitis of Iranian Balochi origin are Sunni Muslim. Balochi families first immigrated to Kuwait in the 19th century.

The Persian sub-dialects of Larestani, Khonji, Bastaki and Gerashi have influenced the vocabulary of Kuwaiti Arabic.

== See also ==
- Foreign relations of Iran
- Foreign relations of Kuwait
- 'Ajam of Kuwait
- Ministry of Foreign Affairs (Kuwait)
