= Amal Anbari =

Moroccan actor

- أمل العنبري
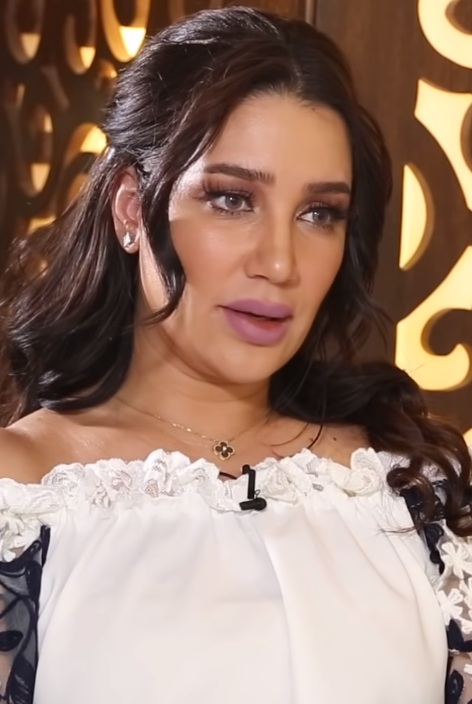
- Amal Anbari guest of Al-Rawdatain TV, May 2017
- Born: April 16, 1987 (age 38); Morocco
- Citizenship: Morocco;Bahrain
- Occupation: Actress
- Years active: 2006—Present

Amal Anbari (Arabic: أمل العنبري; born April 16, 1987), is a Bahraini-Moroccan actress and singer.

== Biography ==
Born in Morocco, Anbari holds Bahraini citizenship, and her debut was on the fourth season of Star Academy, broadcast in 2006 on LBC out of Lebanon. After her elimination from the show, she moved to Beirut, from whence she moved again to live with her aunt in Kuwait. In 2010, she enrolled at the Higher Institute of Dramatic Arts there, but she left for a casting call in Bahrain with Kuwaiti director Mohammed Daham Al-Shammari.

=== Personal life ===
Anbari married Kuwaiti-Lebanese fashion designer Usama Faham, brother of her manager Zakaria Faham, in 2008, and left the entertainment business for some time. She separated in mid-2009, resuming her career and marrying a Bahraini businessman, whereby she acquired Bahraini citizenship.

=== Music ===
Anbari released several singles, starting with her own composition, “روح إبعد بعيد” (“So Far Away”). Two more singles were released in Bahrain. “رضيت بالمر” was accompanied by a video filmed in Kuwait and featured lyrics by Meshal Al-Zayer, music by Nasser Naif, and arranged by Bader Karam. “كثير كثير” (“Very Much”), recorded in Lebanon, featured music by Tareq Abu Judeh, lyrics by Elias Nasser, arranged by Michel Fadel.

== Acting breakthrough ==
Anbari's breakthrough into acting came when Al-Shammari cast her in بعدك طيب (“Beyond Taib”), after which she mastered Kuwaiti Arabic, which she would use in later television and theater roles.

== Career ==
=== Scripted television ===
Filmography
| Year | Series |
|---|---|
| 2010 | بعدك طيب |
| 2010 | أسرار القلوب (“Secrets of Hearts”) |
| 2010 | Shara Al Nufus 3 |
| 2010 | Zawarat Al Khamis |
| 2011 | Another Time for Love |
| 2011 | Al-Jeleeb |
| 2011 | Laila 3 |
| 2011 | Al-Malika |
| 2011 | Second Chance |
| 2011 | Al-Mezwaj 2 |
| 2011 | Impossible Love, several episodes of anthology |
| 2012 | Between Past and Love |
| 2012 | Arwah |
| 2012 | El Nas Ajnas 2 |
| 2015 | I Loved You Since Childhood |
| 2016 | Joud |
| 2018 | Itr Al Rooh |
| 2018 | El Batran |

=== Theatre ===
Dramatic Career
| Year | Play |
|---|---|
| 2009 | فايتي و سبيدي |
| 2015 | Turtle Champions (Revival, originally 1991) |

=== Film ===
Filmography
| Year | Film |
|---|---|
| 2015 | Beloved of the Earth (film) |
| 2016 | Back to the Q82 |

=== Variety television ===
TV Hosting Career
| Year | Show | Channel |
|---|---|---|
| 2017–Present | Swalif Doha | Al-Shahed TV |
