= Najeeba Hayat =

Kuwaiti footwear designer

- Born: 1991 (age 34–35); London, England
- Citizenship: Kuwait
- Occupations: Luxury footwear designer, activist
- Years active: 2013–present

Najeeba Hayat (born 1991) is a Kuwaiti footwear designer, entrepreneur, and activist.

== Early life ==
Hayat was born in 1991 to a Shia Kuwaiti family of Iranian descent. She graduated from Al-Bayan Bilingual School (BBS) in 2008 and then completed an undergraduate degree in government at the Wesleyan University in 2013. In 2014, she moved to Italy to study technical footwear pattern making at the historical Ars Sutoria school.

== Career ==
=== Fashion ===
Hayat is the founder, designer, and CEO of Liudmila, a luxury footwear company based in Milan. The Italian company was founded in November 2013 and was previously sold at international luxury retailers like Browns, Farfetch, and Moda Operandi. Hayat's company was named after the Russian character Liudmila Rutilova from Fyodor Sologub's The Petty Demon. She was mainly inspired by a Russian literature class at Wesleyan University. Her designs have been influenced by Victorian fashion, fairytale characters, and Iranian painter Mahmoud Farshchian.

In 2017, she released a collaboration line with Jewish American celebrity stylist Avigail Collins. In 2018, she was featured in Chopard's Happy Hearts campaign alongside several other Middle Eastern women. In 2019, she was named among the finalists of Fashion Trust Arabia. In 2021, she was ranked number 36 in Forbes's Women Behind Middle Eastern Brands 2021 list.

=== Activism ===
Outside of fashion design, Hayat has frequently utilized her social media platforms for social justice activism, criticizing policymakers and human rights abuses. Hayat was one of the co-founders of Kuwait's "MeToo movement". She made her voice known in 2021 during women's rights protests after the murder of Farah Akbar. Utilizing Clubhouse and Instagram, she partnered with Ascia Al Faraj to create an online campaign, #LanAsket, (Arabic for "I will not be silent") to raise awareness about harassment, domestic abuse, and honor killings in Kuwait. The campaign encouraged Kuwaitis to post a video or photo wearing a black abaya (all-black attire) to symbolize mourning. At the onset of the 2023 Israeli blockade of the Gaza Strip, Hayat became a vocal critic of Israel Defense Forces' tactics against Palestinian civilians in Gaza, prompting her Instagram account @liudmilahq to be suspended for violating community guidelines.

== Controversy ==
In October 2023 during the Gaza war, Israeli media reported that Hayat was directly involved in the removal of Israeli fashion designer Dorit Bar Or from Mytheresa, Net-a-Porter, and Matches Fashion following Bar Or's pro-IDF Instagram story that contained the adhan (Islamic call to prayer) in the background. In November 2023, Net-a-Porter and Mytheresa reinstated Bar Or after she apologized and clarified "I had not realized this warning video was led by the voice of Adhan in the background, I did not mean to offend anyone by that".

== See also ==
- Israel–Kuwait relations
