= Dorit Bar Or =

Israeli actress and fashion designer

- דורית בר אור
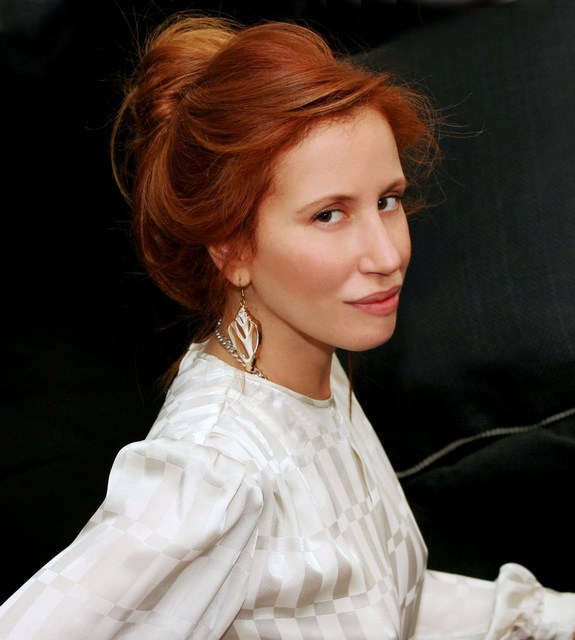
- Dorit Bar Or, 2008 (shot in Tel Aviv, Israel)
- Born: May 19, 1975 (age 51); Israel
- Occupation: Actress
- Years active: 1994–present

Dorit Bar Or (a.k.a. Dodo Bar Or) (Hebrew: דורית בר אור; born May 19, 1975) is an Israeli actress and fashion designer.

In August 2009, Bar Or and the puppet cast of the TV show Red Band won the prize for the best TV comedy of the year. That year, she was also cited as Israel's best-dressed woman in Pnai Plus magazine.

== Theater, television and film career ==
Dorit Bar Or graduated with an acting degree from Sorbonne, Paris in 1994. She then moved to Tel Aviv and starred in several low-key theater adaptations including Love and Human Remains, in the role of Candy. She also played the role of French Revolutionist Charlotte Corday in Peter Weiss's Marat/Sade. At Beit Lessin Theater in Tel Aviv she led the cast of Slihot, written by Hana Azoulay-Hasfari. She later joined the cast of the Cameri Theater production of Mirele Efros with co-actress Yona Elian. For that role she was nominated "Promising Actress Of The Year". The following year, she performed in Milano, a play by Shmuel Hasfari.

In 1999, Bar Or appeared alongside Zvika Hadar in Shemesh, an Israeli sitcom. The following year she played the lead in Ken O Lo with actor and filmmaker Assi Dayan on Israel's Channel 1. In 2000, she appeared in the first Channel 2 Israeli neighborhood-oriented drama Florentin directed by Eytan Fox. Her colleague in that show was Angels & Demons's star Ayelet Zurer.

In 2004 she made her debut on Channel 10, playing a leading role in Ahava Ze Koev, created by Dana Modan. The series won Best Drama and Best Scripted Show at Israel's Television Academy Awards for that year.

She appeared in the feature film Gotta have Joy by Julie Shles and Etzba Haeloim by Dany Boon.

Returning to television in 2006, Bar Or hosted 48 Hours, one of Israel's first reality shows, alongside Ido Rosenblum. She also played the leading role of Adi in a drama series, Hot's Parashat Ha-Shavua created by Rani Blair and Ari Folman.

In 2008, she appeared in Out of the Blue, written and directed by Yigal Bursztyn.

In 2007, Bar Or starred in the series Al Ktzot Hezbaot, the story of three dancer sisters enmeshed in a world of law and misfortune. The show was produced by Keshet and aired on Israeli Channel 2 for 24 episodes.

In 2009, Bar Or appeared in the comedy show Red Band directed by Eitan Tzur.

== Fashion career ==
Bar Or is the designer of Pas Pour Toi (Not For You). Explaining the name of her label, she says: "Forgive my arrogance, but I'm a style icon in Israel. I'm a very famous actress and I got sick of everyone asking where my clothes were from. I started making up names. It was hilarious. Everyone would say, 'Oh yes I love that designer' or 'I wear such and such's clothes, too'—and it didn't exist. So it amuses me to call my line Not For You. It's the opposite of inclusive..."

== Controversies ==
Bar Or, among others, has been accused of cultural appropriation in her use of the chequered design pattern commonly associated with Palestinian keffiyeh.

In October 2023, Israeli media reported that Bar Or posted a controversial Instagram story during the Gaza war, which resulted in her eponymous line's removal from Mytheresa, Net-a-Porter, and Matches Fashion following complaints by Kuwaiti designer Najeeba Hayat. In her controversial post, Bar Or shared a video that "depicts a scene from the movie Independence Day in which a spaceship (encircled by the flags of Iran, Palestine, Hezbollah, and ISIS) destroys a tower bearing flags of Western nations (including the US and Great Britain). The Islamic call to prayer known as Adhan is heard in the background as the tower erupts in a fireball and the words “The West is Next” appear across the screen as does “#hamas=isis #freegazafromhamas.”" In November 2023, Net-a-Porter and Mytheresa reinstated Bar Or after she apologized and clarified "I had not realized this warning video was led by the voice of Adhan in the background, I did not mean to offend anyone by that".

== See also ==
- Television in Israel
- Israeli fashion
