= Halema Boland =

Kuwaiti television host

- حليمة بولند
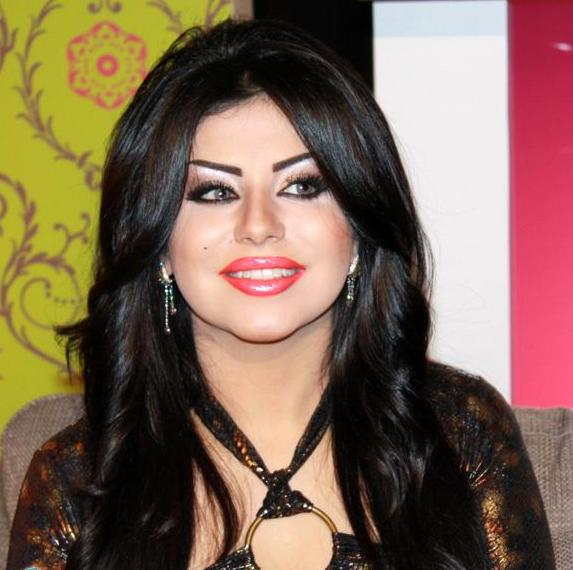
- Born: Halema Abdoljalil Boland; Kuwait
- Occupation: television host
- Years active: 2001–present
- Spouse: Abdul-Salam Al-Khubaizi

Halema or Halimeh Boland (Arabic: حليمة بولند) is a Kuwaiti television presenter and former fashion model well known in the Middle East and North Africa region.

== Career ==
She began her career in the mid 1990s as a television presenter on Kuwait Television. She gained notoriety for her unconventional clothing choices and "ditzy" personality. She quickly became one of the most popular female media personalities in the Middle East and North Africa region. In 2007, she was awarded "Miss Arabian Journalist" award.

In 2009 during the month of Ramadan, Halema, in conjunction with station MBC, starred in the "Series Halema". It was a quiz program and garnered a large viewership. It was described as controversial, which was written about extensively in the press.

Boland joined the "funoon-tv" channel in 2011.

== Personal life ==
Boland is a Kuwaiti citizen of Iranian ancestry. In the early 2000s, she married her university classmate, Abdul-Salam Al-Khubaizi and later on divorced him.

In April 2024, she was sentenced to two years in prison and fined 2,000 Kuwaiti dinars for misusing revealing photos and videos on social media. However, on June 9 of the same year, the appellate court abstained from enforcing the punishment and canceled her two-year imprisonment.
