= Kuwait–United States relations =

- Kuwait: United States

Kuwait–United States relations refer to the bilateral relations between Kuwait and the United States. Kuwait is a designated major non-NATO ally of the United States.

As of 2024, there were 5,102 international students of Kuwaiti origin studying in the United States, representing 0.6% of all foreigners pursuing higher education in America.

== History ==
The United States opened a consulate in Kuwait in October 1951, which was elevated to embassy status at the time of Kuwait's independence 10 years later. The United States supports Kuwait's sovereignty, security and independence, as well as its multilateral diplomatic efforts to build greater cooperation among the GCC countries.

Strategic cooperation between the United States and Kuwait increased in 1987 with the implementation of a maritime protection regime that ensured the freedom of navigation through the Persian Gulf for 11 Kuwaiti tankers that were reflagged with U.S. markings.

The U.S.-Kuwaiti strategic partnership intensified dramatically again after Iraq's invasion of Kuwait. The United States spearheaded United Nations Security Council demands that Iraq withdraw from Kuwait and its authorization of the use of force, if necessary, to remove Iraqi forces from the occupied country. The United States subsequently played a dominant role in the development of the multinational military Operations Desert Shield and Desert Storm that liberated Kuwait. The U.S.-Kuwaiti relationship remained strong in the post-Gulf War period. Kuwait and the United States worked on a daily basis to monitor and enforce Iraq's compliance with UN Security Council resolutions.

Since Kuwait's liberation, the United States has provided military and defense technical assistance to Kuwait from both foreign military sales (FMS) and commercial sources. The U.S. Office of Military Cooperation in Kuwait is attached to the American embassy and manages the FMS program. There are currently over 100 open FMS contracts between the U.S. military and the Kuwait Ministry of Defense totaling $8.1 billion. Principal U.S. military systems currently purchased by the Kuwait Defense Forces are Patriot Missile systems, F-18 Hornet fighters, the M1A2 main battle tank, AH-64D Apache helicopter, and a major recapitalization of Kuwait's Navy with U.S. boats.

Kuwaiti attitudes toward American people and products have been favorable since the Gulf War, with 63% of Kuwaitis viewing the U.S. favorably in 2003 – a view more positive than that of close U.S. NATO allies such as Italy, Germany, and France – declining slightly down to 46% in 2007. In 1993, Kuwait publicly announced abandonment of the secondary and tertiary aspects of the Arab boycott of Israel (those aspects affecting U.S. firms).

Kuwait also is an important partner in the ongoing U.S.-led campaign against international terrorism, providing assistance in the military, diplomatic, and intelligence arenas and also supporting efforts to block financing of terrorist groups. In January 2005, Kuwait Security Services forces engaged in gun battles with local extremists, resulting in fatalities on both sides in the first such incident in Kuwait's history.

== Kuwaiti Embassy ==
The Kuwaiti embassy is located in Washington, D.C.

- Ambassador Salem Abdullah Al-Jaber Al-Sabah

On 4 May 2022, US First Lady Jill Biden attended the Kuwait-America Foundation gala dinner as guest of honour which was held at the Kuwait Embassy in the nation’s capital in support of the United Nations High Commissioner for Refugees (UNHCR) impactful work worldwide.

== U.S. Embassy ==
The U.S. embassy is located in Kuwait City.

- Ambassador Karen Sasahara

== See also ==
- Foreign relations of the United States
- Foreign relations of Kuwait
- Kuwaiti Americans
- List of ambassadors of Kuwait to the United States
