= Ema Shah =

Kuwaiti singer, composer, dancer, and director

Ema Shah ايما شاه
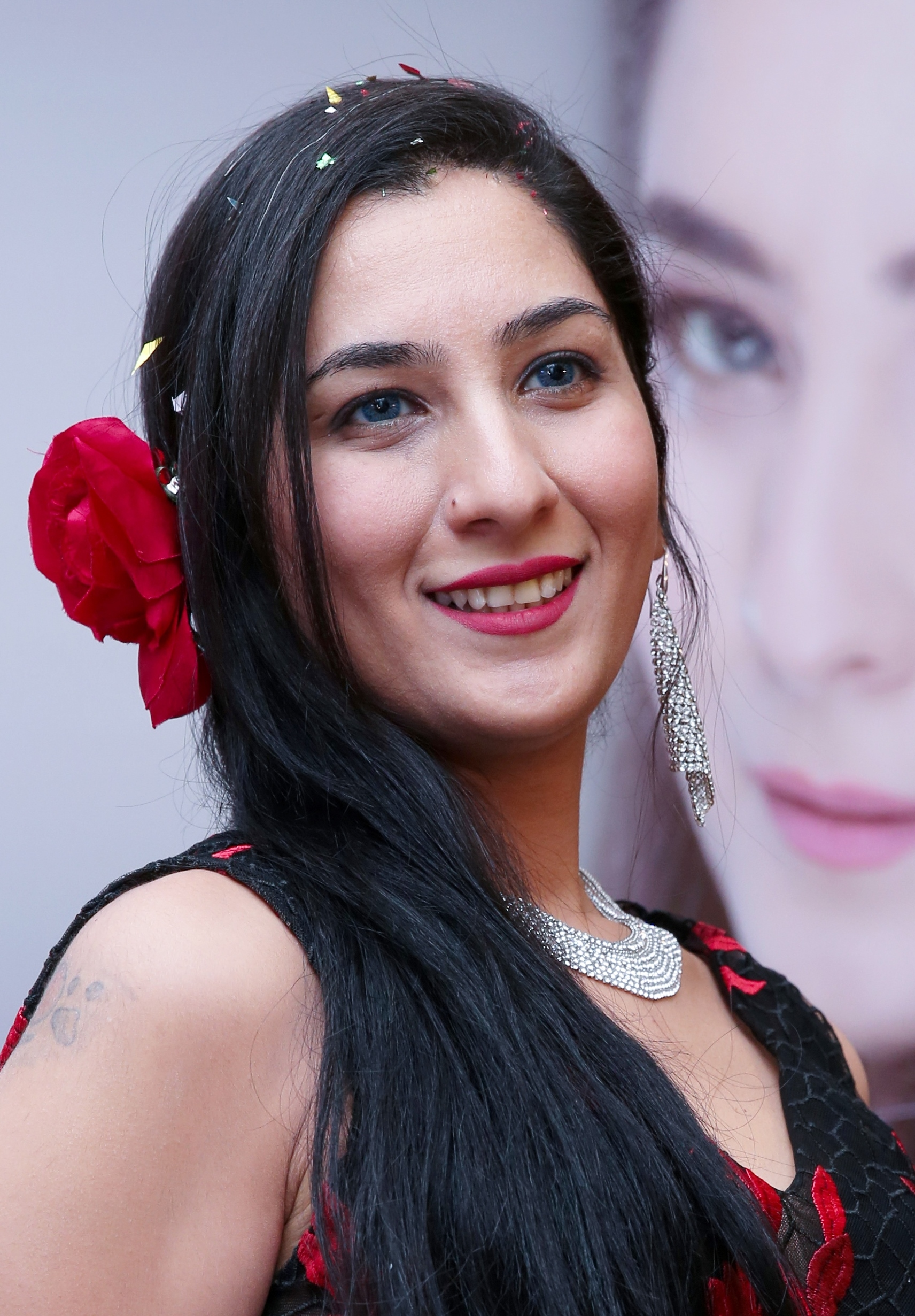
- Ema Shah, The Launch of Emagination Album

Background information
- Born: 7 June 1981 (age 44)
- Origin: Kuwait
- Genres: World music; Arabic music; eastern music
- Occupations: Singer; musician; composer; dancer; pianist; guitarist; writer; theater director
- Instruments: Piano; guitar; vocals
- Website: emashah.net

Ema Shah (Arabic: ايما شاه) (born 7 June 1981) is a Kuwaiti singer, composer, pianist, guitarist, writer, dancer, and director. Her father is Kuwaiti of Iranian descent, and her mother is Iranian. At the 2014 Winter Film Awards in New York City she won the award for Best Music Video, she won Best Short International Film at the 2016 North Hollywood Cinema Festival, she received five awards at the 2013 Best Shorts Competition in California, she won Finalist Best Short Film at the 2013 Back in the Box Competition, and she received six nominations at the Best Shorts Competition and one in the 2014 St Albans Film Festival in the UK for her music video "Masheenee Alcketiara". In 2012, she sang to the Kuwaiti Prime Minister Prince Nasser Mohammed Al-Ahmed Al-Sabah, a song of the Kuwaiti heritage sung by Abdel Halim Hafez.

== Career ==
=== Early life ===
Shah studied opera, photography, and film. She has attracted attention through her activism, radical views, humanitarian and often controversial points of view, and eccentricity. In addition to being a founding member and president of the troupe Anthropology, she is a member of Team Force of the Rising Sun for brides in Kuwait, the Kuwait Cinema Club, the National Democratic Youth League, the Kuwait Democratic Forum, the Dubai Community Theater, the Kuwaiti Human Rights Association, and Club Business and Professional Women in Kuwait.

=== Theater ===
She made her debut stage appearance in Silence by Harold Pinter, followed by The Rhinoceros by Eugène Ionesco 2004, The old women and the poet by Yukiomicemia, Debate between night and day by Mohammed Affendi Al-Gazairi, the clown "Monodrama Bantomim" (at the Mediterranean People Festival-Italy), and The Meteor by Dorinmat.

In 2006, Ema established her group "Anthropology", joining actors from different nationalities, with performances, spectacles, and songs in different languages, including Arabic, English, French, Japanese, and Spanish. She has performed as a singer, pianist, composer, and actress at various local and international events.

=== Films ===
In 2011, she starred in a short movie called "Swing". She also acted on a short movie called Mooz (Banana). The film containing sexual allusions won the jury prize at the Dubai International Film Festival.

=== Music ===
She composed a collection of musicals inspired by books like "Jesus, the Son of Human", and The Prophet, written by Gibran Khalil Gibran, and performed them using piano and guitar at the Kuwait National Museum. She has also sung covers for many well-known and international artists. She took part in the musical We can not write on a black page. Her singles include "Shah", about her grandfather Shah Khan. She has sung lyrics written by, amongst others, Lebanese Elia Abu Madi, Saudi Malek Asfeer, and Australian Miranda Lee.

== Controversy ==
Ema sparked a big controversy after singing "Hava Nagila" in Hebrew, which led to her being accused by some Islamic clerics of promoting Zionism and normalization of ties with Israel. International news agencies, and Arab and Israeli media, covered the story and the Los Angeles Times ran an article about the affair under the headline "Diva blasted by Islamic clerics for singing in Hebrew at club" including reports of putting her on trial. There were also threats on her life. Shah explained that she sang the song as she wanted to go beyond borders, and break barriers in support of universal peace between nations.

== Dancing ==
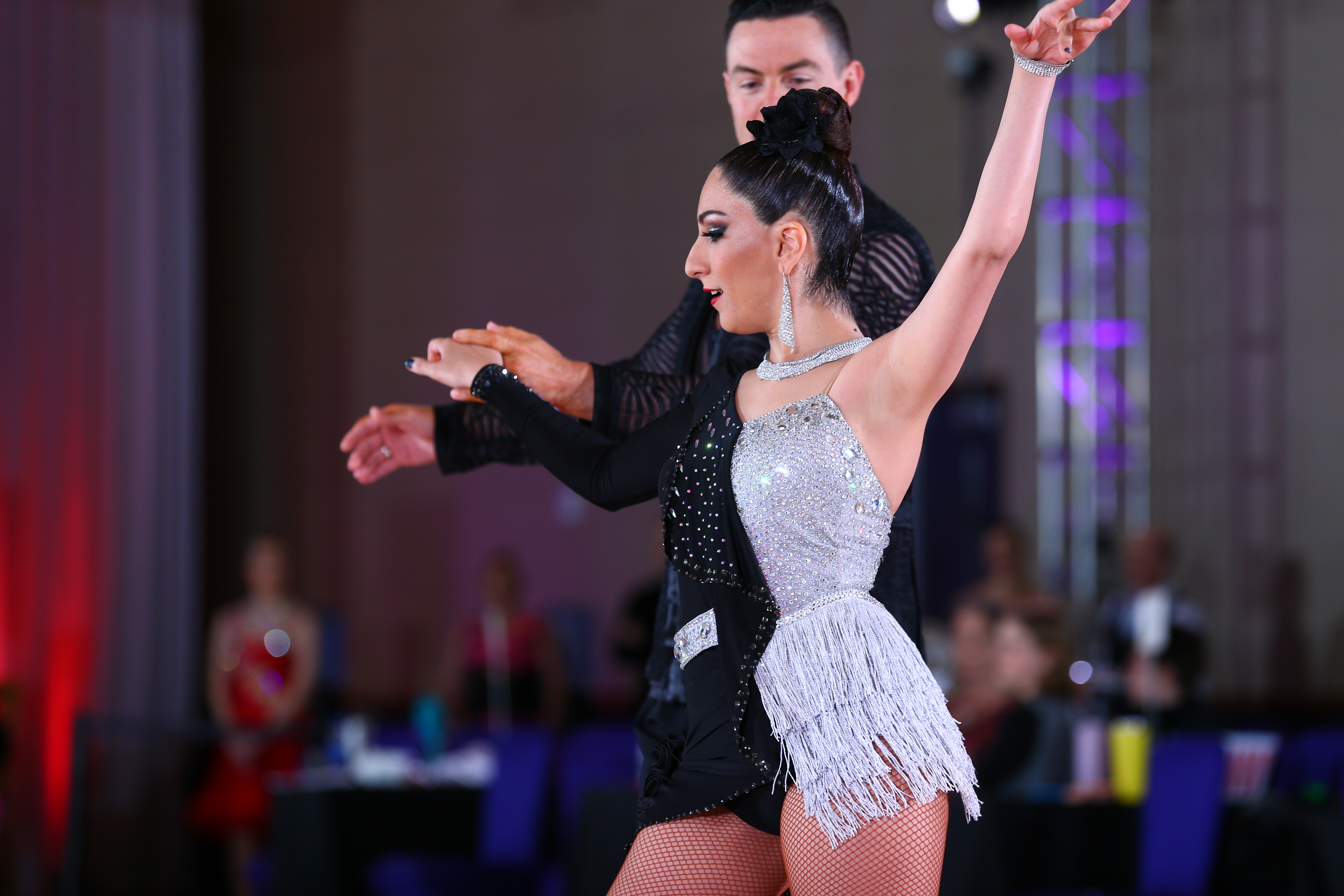
Ema Shah competes in rumba at The Twin Cities Open in Minneapolis

Shah competed in dancing rumba at the Twin Cities Open 2019 in Minneapolis, reaching the finals. She danced different styles of silver–level rumba. They took second place in closed rumba, and third place in open rumb].

Below is the picture of a rare international duo: Gordan Bratt from Dancers Studio in St. Paul, Minnesota, dancing with Ema Shah, officially the first Arab dancer from Kuwait and the Persian Gulf, in history, to Latin dance competitively.

The second competing: Ema was a 5× winner at the Embassy Ballroom Championship 28 September 2019 in Irvine, California, Dancing with Fred Astaire Studio professional: Forrest Walsh from Pasadena, California:

4× WINNER: Closed Gold Rumba 1st & 2nd Place: Open Silver Rumba 2nd Place: Open Gold Rumba 3rd Place: Open Gold Rumba

== Filmography ==
- MOOZ (Banana)- actress (2009)
- Swing - actress (2011)
- I wish we were Dancers - main actress (2011)
- Choose to See - Director "Music Video"(2012)
- Hey Mister - Director "Music Video"(2012)
- Masheenee Alcketiara - Producer, Director "Music Video"(2013)
- Aleqini - Producer, Director "Music Video" (2014)
- Who Killed $arah "Short Film" (2014)
- Nashi and Mira - main actress "Future Film" (2015)
- Bell - Producer, Director "Music Video" (2018)
- The Visitor - main actress "Short Film" (2019)

== Discography ==
- The Poem And the old woman, 2008.
- SYNC INFINITI, 2010.
- Emagination, 2018.
- In Love, 2019.

== Awards ==
- The Youth Theater |Kuwait|
  - 2004 - Best Second Actress
- Best Shorts Competition |USA| Awards on IMDB
  - 2013 - Award of Merit Best Music Video
  - 2013 - Award of Merit Viewer Impact: Entertainment Value
  - 2013 - Award of Merit Art Direction
  - 2013 - Awards of Excellence Concept
  - 2013 - Awards of Excellence Viewer Impact: Motivational/Inspirational
- Back in the Box Competition |USA|
  - 2013 - Finalist Best Short Film
- Winter Film Awards |USA|
  - 2014 - Best Music Video
- Horror Hotel: International Festival and Convention |USA|
  - 2014 - 1st place music video
- Twickenham Alive Film Festival |England|
  - 2015 - International Drama Award: Special Mention Award Awards Ceremony 2014
- The Accolade Competition |USA|
  - 2014 - Award of Excellence Music Videos
  - 2014 - Award of Excellence Art Direction
  - 2014 - Award of Merit Direction
  - 2014 - Award of Merit Costume Design
- WORLD MUSIC & FILM FESTIVAL |USA|
  - 2014 - Best Music Video
- The IndieFest Film Awards |USA|
  - 2014 - Award of Merit Best Music Video
- Global Music Awards (GMA) |USA|
  - 2015 - Bronze Medal Female Vocalist Awards on IMDB
  - 2015 - Bronze Medal Lyrics/songwriter "Aleqini"
- The Northern Virginia International Film Festival |USA|
  - 2015 - Best Music Video "Masheenee Alcketiara"
- Los Angeles Independent Film Festival Awards |Hollywood|
  - 2015 - Best Music Video "Masheenee Alcketiara"
- St Albans Film Festival Nominations |England|
  - 2014 - Best Music Video
- Be Film The Underground Film Festival Nominations |USA|
  - 2014 - Best Music Video
- Meters Film Festival Nominations |Russia|
  - 2015 - Best Music Video "Masheenee Alcketiara"
- American Sephardic federation Award |USA|

2016

- North Hollywood Cinema Festival |USA|
  - 2016 - Best International Short Film "Masheenee Alcketiara"
- Mediterranean Film Festival |Italy|
  - 2018 - Best Music Video/ International "Masheenee Alcketiara"
- Chambal International Film Festival |India|
  - 2019 - Best Music Video/ International "Masheenee Alcketiara"
- Kapow International Film Festival |Hollywood, USA|
  - 2019 - Best Music Videol "Masheenee Alcketiara"
