= Ascia AKF =

Kuwaiti blogger

Ascia
- Born: Ascia Al Faraj; October 19, 1989 (age 36); Kuwait
- Occupations: Blogger; Fashion designer
- Known for: the-hybrids.com

Ascia Al Faraj (born 19 October 1989), known by her blogging name Ascia AKF, is a Kuwaiti fashion blogger, model, and fashion designer. Al Faraj, with over two million Instagram followers, is considered one of the Middle East's most influential bloggers and social media influencers. She is also popular in Malaysia and Indonesia.

She has worked with brands such as Ralph Lauren, Dior, Chanel, TAG Heuer, Net-a-Porter, and Tory Burch. She is also the face of Riva Fashion. Her fashion and style are mainly for women who dress modestly.

On 10 July 2018, Al Faraj uploaded a video on YouTube discussing her views on modesty and faith saying that she doesn't consider herself a hijabi and it would be "disrespectful" to call herself a hijabi. "I do not consider myself to be a hijabi because I don’t feel that it is in line with the viewpoint that I have now approaching 30. It’s not the viewpoint that I think is representative of me as a person. ... I consider myself in the modest fashion space".

== Career ==
=== Blogging ===
Al Faraj began her blogging career in 2012, her first post was titled "Some Mosaic. Some Marni." She came to prominence after she worked with Areej Al Kharafi, a Kuwaiti Boutique owner. She gained about 12,000 followers within hours after the release of their project. In May 2014, along with her husband Ahmad, they started their YouTube channel "The Hybrids".

=== Fashion design ===
In 2010, Al Faraj launched her clothing line Twenty.10 by AKF. In 2014, she, along with Syrian designer Manar Laktineh, introduced a line of handbags. In 2015, she launched a line of turbans.

== Personal life ==
Ascia Al Faraj married Ahmad Al-Balooshi on November 3, 2011. Together they have two sons Adam and Noah. On December 29, 2022 she announced her divorce from Al-Balooshi.
