= Dina Al-Sabah =

Kuwaiti figure competitor (born 1974)

- Professional bodybuilder

Personal info
- Born: February 28, 1974 (age 52); Beirut, Lebanon

Best statistics
- Height: 5 ft 5 in (1.65 m)
- Weight: 117-118 lb (contest); 123-125 lb (off-season)

Professional (Pro) career
- Pro-debut: Pittsburgh Pro Figure Championships; 2003
- Best win: 2003 Jan Tana Pro Figure Champion; 2003
- Predecessor: None
- Successor: Felicia Romero
- Active: Since 1999

Dina Al-Sabah (born February 28, 1974) is a professional figure competitor from Kuwait.

== Biography ==
Al-Sabah was born in Beirut, Lebanon; her mother is of Turkish and Syrian origin, while her father is Kuwaiti, Turkish and East African origin.

Al-Sabah started competing in 1999; she decided to try for the NPC Figure Nationals after winning the Monica Brant Fitness Classic in 2001. When trying to register for the nationals she found out that she had to be a United States citizen in order to be allowed to compete at any of the NPC pro qualifiers. The only way she could compete in the Pro Division of the IFBB was to have recommendation from the Kuwaiti national federation associated with the IFBB. Due to traditional Arab beliefs, women are not allowed to compete in any bodybuilding competitions, and she was denied a recommendation.

Her decision to compete and model has received criticism from conservative Arabs.

Al-Sabah is continuing her career as a fitness model, appearing in many fitness publications including Oxygen, Ironman, American Curves, Muscle and Fitness, Muscle Mag International and Flex. She is the co-host of Living Beautiful Radio. She is a promoter of issues dealing with female sexuality as well as a reviewer of adult products catering to women and couples.

== Vital stats ==
- Full name: Dina Al-Sabah
- Birthday: February 28
- Place of birth: Beirut, Lebanon
- Current state of residence: Nevada
- Occupation: IFBB pro figure athlete, fitness model, information systems consultant, and radio host
- Marital status: married
- Height: 5'5"
- Weight: 117-118 lbs (contest); 123-125 lbs (off-season)
- Eye color: brown
- Hair color: brown

== Contest history ==
- 1999 NGA Mount Rodgers Cup Novice, 2nd
- 2000 NPC EastCoast Tournament of Champions (MW), 4th
- 2000 NPC BodyRock, 2nd (LW), won the Best Poser Award
- 2001 NPC Monica Brant Fitness Classic, 1st (Tall) and Overall
- 2001 NPC Jan Tana Figure, 1st (Tall), and Overall
- 2001 NPC NorthEastern Figure Classic, 3rd (Tall)
- 2002 NPC Pittsburgh Figure Championship, 3rd (Tall)
- 2002 NPC Bev Francis Atlantic States Figure Championship, 1st (Tall) and Overall
- 2002 NPC Debbie Kruck Figure Classic, 1st (Tall) and Overall
- 2002 NPC NorthEast Figure Classic, 1st (Tall) and Overall
- 2003 IFBB Pittsburgh Pro Figure, 4th
- 2003 IFBB NOC Figure Championships 6th
- 2003 IFBB NY Pro Figure Championships 2nd
- 2003 IFBB Jan Tana Pro Figure, 1st
- 2003 IFBB Miss Figure Olympia, 5th
- 2003 IFBB GNC Show of Strength, 3rd
- 2004 IFBB Figure International, 7th
- 2004 IFBB GNC Show of Strength, 14th
- 2004 IFBB Miss Figure Olympia, 13th
- 2006 IFBB Tournament of Champions Pro Figure, 9th
- 2006 IFBB Palm Beach Pro Figure, 12th
- 2006 IFBB Sacrament Pro Figure, 8th
- 2010 IFBB PBW Tampa Pro Bikini, 6th
- 2010 IFBB Jacksonville Pro Championships, 5th
- 2010 IFBB Tournament of Champions, 5th
- 2010 IFBB Detroit Pro, 3rd
- 2010 IFBB Bikini Olympia, 10th

== Personal life ==
Sabah is married to David Alden. The couple have one son and one daughter.

== See also ==
- List of female fitness & figure competitors
