= Muhammad Baqir al-Muhri =

Sayyid Muhammad-Baqir al-Muhri
- السيد محمد باقر المهري
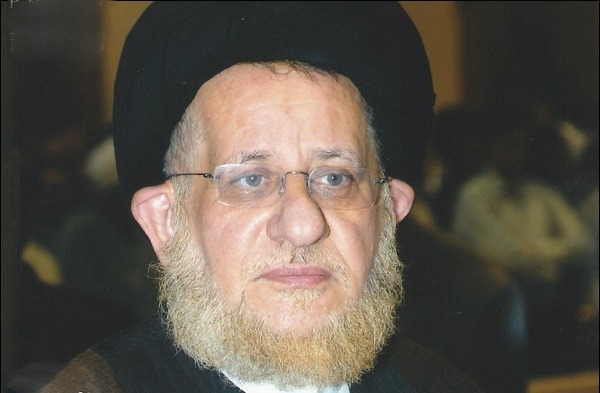
- Ayatollah Sayyid Muhammad Baqir al-Muhri.

Personal life
- Born: 25 December 1948 Kuwait
- Died: 4 July 2015 (aged 66) Kuwait
- Spouse: Um Ja'far

Religious life
- Religion: Islam
- Denomination: Twelver Shia

Sayyid Muhammad Baqir Al-Mūsawī Al-Muhrī (Arabic: السيد محمد باقر الموسوي المهري; also spelled Al-Mohri; 25 December 1948 – 4 July 2015) was a Kuwaiti Shi'ite Islamic Scholar, and a representative (wakil) of the majority of the grand Shi'ite maraji'.

== Death ==
Al-Muhri died on 4 July 2015 and is buried in Wadi-us-Salaam cemetery in Najaf.
