= Ali al-Ihqaqi =

Kuwaiti religious leader

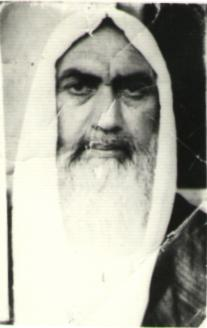
Mousa al-Ihqaqi

Mirza Ali Mousa al-Ihqaqi (Arabic: الميرزا علي موسى الإحقاقي) (October 14, 1887 - January 5, 1967) was a Kuwaiti Twelver Shia marja, and the spiritual leader of the Ihqaqi branch of the Shaykhi school of thought. The al-Ihqaqi family originated from the city of Osku in Iranian Azerbaijan, yet al-Ihqaqi took up residence in Kuwait in the 1950s to lead the Shaykhi community's religious affairs, and he was the first Shaykhi marja who became established in Kuwait.

== Bibliography ==
- Louër, Laurence (1988). Transnational Shia Politics: Religious and Political Networks in the Gulf. HURST Publishers Ltd. ISBN 978-1-85065-911-2.
- Ahmed M., Yaqoob (2010). Al-Mīrzā ʻAlī Al-Ḥāʼerī Al-Ihqāqī (in Arabic). Imam Mahdi Centre, Kuwait.
