= Sami Al-Lanqawi =

Kuwaiti footballer

Sami Al Lanqawi
Personal information
- Full name: Sami abdullah hasan al-lanqawi
- Date of birth: 1 June 1972
- Place of birth: Kuwait
- Date of death: 30 November 1997 (aged 25)
- Position: Defender

Senior career*
Years	Team	Apps	(Gls)
1991–1997	Al Arabi	-	(-)

International career
1994–1996	Kuwait	3	(0)
- * Club domestic league appearances and goals

Sami Al Lenqawi (1 June 1972 – 30 November 1997) was a Kuwaiti football defender who played for the national football team in the 1996 Asian Cup. He also played for Al Arabi and competed in the men's tournament at the 1992 Summer Olympics.
