= Zahra Marwan =

Kuwaiti-American artist and writer

- Born: Kuwait
- Citizenship: United States
- Occupations: Artist, illustrator, writer
- Years active: 2015–present

Zahra Marwan is a Kuwaiti-American artist and writer. Her work mainly focuses on her early life as a stateless person in Kuwait and an immigrant in New Mexico. She has won various international awards and fellowships. Her debut book received critical acclaim.

== Early life ==
Marwan was born in Kuwait to a stateless Shia family from the Ajam ethnic group. In the 1950s, her family name was lost in translation during census registration. Her mother has Kuwaiti citizenship. Her father was born stateless despite having Kuwaiti family members. She immigrated to New Mexico as a child and eventually became an American citizen at the age of 16. She graduated from Rio Rancho High School. She holds a Bachelor of Arts from the University of New Mexico in Languages and Literature, with a minor in Flamenco Dance and History as well as a minor in Philosophy. She also studied the visual arts in France.

== Career ==
Her debut picture book, Where Butterflies Fill the Sky, was published by Bloomsbury Books in March 2022 and named one of The New York Times / New York Public Library's 10 Best Illustrated Books as well as NPR's Best Books of 2022. She also won the Ezra Jack Keats Honor for Illustration and a Dilys Evans Founders Award from the Society of Illustrators.

She was honored with an award by the UN Human Rights Commission for creating art that brings visibility to statelessness, indigenous groups, and minority rights.

== Works ==
=== Author and illustrator ===
- Where Butterflies Fill the Sky, 2022
- The Sunflowers, 2024
- Fishermans New Year, 2025
- Sakina and the Uninvited Guests, 2025
- Soft Sea Rain and Spirits, 2025

=== Illustrator ===
- The Goldfish written by Katherine Arden, 2024
- My Sister the Apple Tree written by Jamal Saeed and Jordan Scott, 2025
- Haniya's Ramadan Garden written by Zeshan Akhter, 2025

== See also ==
- Bedoon
- 'Ajam of Kuwait
