= Ahmad Abdulghafour =

Kuwaiti footballer

Ahmad Abdulghafoor
Personal information
- Full name: Ahmad Abdulghafoor (Arabic:أحمد عبد الغفور)
- Date of birth: June 3, 1987 (age 39)
- Place of birth: Kuwait City, Kuwait
- Height: 1.80 m (5 ft 11 in)
- Position: Defender

Youth career
- 1995–2006: Al Arabi

Senior career*
Years	Team	Apps	(Gls)
2006–2016	Al Arabi	212	(7)
2016–2022	Al-Salmiya	60	(2)
2021	→ Khaitan (loan)	4	(0)
2022	→ Al-Yarmouk SC (loan)	3	(0)

International career
2008	Kuwait U21	3	(0)
- * Club domestic league appearances and goals as of January 19, 2018

Ahmad Abdulghafoor (Arabic: أحمد عبدالغفور, born 2 June 1987) was a Kuwaiti footballer.

He played for Al Arabi for many years, including in the 2007 AFC Champions League group stage, before joining Al-Salmiya SC in 2016.
