= Ahmad Johar =

Kuwaiti actor and director (1958–2023)

- أحمد جوهر
- Born: 29 March 1958; Kuwait
- Died: 25 May 2023 (aged 65); London, England
- Occupations: Actor, director, writer
- Years active: 1982–2021

Ahmad Johar (Arabic: أحمد جوهر; 29 March 1958 – 25 May 2023) was a Kuwaiti actor, director and writer.

== Biography ==
He graduated from the Higher Institute of Theatrical Arts in 1984.

He began his career as an actor, then moved into production in addition to acting, and in recent years he has been writing his own works.

Johar received Kuwait's State Merit Award for his work as an actor.

Johar was hospitalised on 21 June 2020 after suffering a stroke and a pulmonary edema. He died in London, England on 25 May 2023, at the age of 65.
