= Sara Akbar =

Kuwaiti scientist and activist

- Education: Kuwait University
- Occupations: Chemical engineer, chief executive officer
- Employer: Kuwait Oil Company
- Awards: Global 500 Roll of Honour

Sara Hussein Akbar (Arabic: سارة أكبر) is a Kuwaiti chemical petroleum engineer, women's rights advocate, and co-founder and former chief executive officer of Kuwait Energy. Akbar is recognized as a "national hero" due to her involvement in the Kuwaiti oil fires which were later depicted in the Academy Award nominated documentary Fires of Kuwait. For her firefighting efforts, she was awarded the Global 500 Roll of Honour from the United Nations Environmental Program. Akbar is one of the first women oil sector company executives from the Arabian Peninsula. She served as the director of the Society of Petroleum Engineers in 2007.

== Early life and education ==
Akbar grew up in a large Kuwaiti family consisting of her mother and father, as well as nine brothers and sisters, and her father was an oil driller. She earned her bachelor's degree as part of Kuwait University's first graduating class of Chemical Engineers in 1981.

== Career ==
Akbar began her career working in departmental offices before attaining a position as a petroleum engineer for Kuwait Oil Company. She subsequently worked there in fire-fighting operations, as superintendent of petroleum engineering, and as R&D specialist. Between 1981 and 1999, Akbar worked in the oil sector at Kuwait Energy, a company she co-founded and served as CEO. She is the first woman to hold a leading position in the Middle East oil and gas industry. During the 1990 invasion of Kuwait by Iraq, most of the oil wells in the country (80%) were attacked by Saddam Hussein's army. Akbar was the lone woman on a rogue team of petroleum engineers who acted against orders to take on the dangerous task of dousing oil well fires. She believes it was her familiarity with the wells that allowed her team to be successful: "I worked on the oilfields, offshore and onshore, day and night, and the result of this work was that I knew the oilfields very well... There were 800 wells and I knew every single one like the back of my hand." Their efforts were later shown in Fires of Kuwait, a 1992 documentary that was nominated for Academy Award for Best Documentary Feature.

From 2001 to 2005, she was the business development manager of Kuwait Foreign Petroleum Exploration Company.

In 2006, Akbar was behind the creation of oil and gas legislation and regulations in Somalia. She also was a "catalyst" humanitarian efforts in the country. Under Akbar's direction, Kuwait Energy sponsored approximately "two hundred women to start up small business markets..."

Akbar served as the director-at-large of the Society of Petroleum Engineers in 2007.

In January 2018, Akbar became the only woman on the Board of Trustees of the Silk City and Boubyan Island development authority for the project Madinat al-Hareer. She resigned as the CEO of Kuwait Energy in 2017.

== Accolades ==
Akbar's awards include:

- Global 500 Roll of Honour – United Nations Environment Programme, 1993
- Distinguished Member – Society of Petroleum Engineers, 2003
- Charles F. Rand Memorial Gold Medal – American Institute of Mining, Metallurgical, and Petroleum Engineers, 2013
- Leader in Energy – Women in Leadership Awards and Forum, 2009
- WOW Award (Entrepreneurship Award) – New Arab Woman Forum, 2017
- Ranked 46 out of "The Top 100 Most Powerful Arab Businesswomen" by Forbes

== Women's rights ==
In interviews, Akbar speaks about the role of women in the workplace, especially in Middle Eastern countries. She notes that there is variation between the countries and should not be viewed as equivalent in their advancements of women's rights. Speaking about Kuwait and the women's rights movement, she argues, "Kuwait is top of the class in women’s rights, access to education, business and work. [At the same time], the country remains way behind in terms of political rights, which we finally got four or five years ago. I strongly believe in the 'power of women,' i.e., their ability to fight for what they are entitled to and to finally win the battle. In Kuwait, this movement is quite strong." Akbar does not believe Islam imposes "social limits" on women, instead, she believes there are larger socio-cultural factors that impact women's rights.

== Personal life ==
Akbar credits parental support as a key factor in her success, as well as the success of her siblings. She is currently married and living in Kuwait City with her husband and three children. Akbar is Shia Muslim. Sara Akbar currently resides in Rumathiya
