= Abbas Almohri =

Ayatollah Sayyid Abbas Almohri
- Image of Ayatollah Sayed Abbas Almohri

Personal life
- Born: 1912 Mohr, Fars province, Iran
- Died: February 15, 1988 (aged 75–76) Tehran, Iran
- Children: 11, including Ayatollah Sayyed Mohammad Almohri, and Ayatollah Sayyed Murtadha Almohri
- Notable work: A radius of the History (شعاع من التاريخ)
- Known for: Imam of Masjed Shaban, founding the Ja’fariya School in Kuwait

Religious life
- Religion: Islam
- Denomination: Shia
- Sect: Twelver
- Jurisprudence: Usuli

Ayatollah Sayyid Abbas Almohri (Arabic: آية الله سيد عباس المهري; 1912–1988) was a Kuwaiti Shia scholar and one of the earliest among them. Sayyed Abbas was born in the city of Mohr, province of Fars, Iran. He pursued religious studies in the city of Najaf, Iraq and later went on to Kuwait to spread religious teachings.

== Ethnicity ==
Sayyed Abbas is of Hasawi descent with him having an ancestry of people from Al-Ahsa.

His family eventually migrated to Iran, which led to Sayyed Abbas being born there on 1912.

== Political activity ==
In 1979, Almohri was forced to leave Kuwait with his family as the authorities were worried of increased political activities in Masjed Shaban where he was the Imam (Ghabra, S.N. 1995).

== Family ==
Sayyed Abbas Almohri's family members are Kuwaiti citizens. His eldest son, Sayyed Mohammad Almohri was also a scholar and succeeded his father as the leader of prayer (Imam) in Masjed Shaban, a mosque in Sharq, Kuwait, until his passing in the early 2000s, in which he was succeeded by his son Sayyed Mujtaba Almohri, a prominent Shia scholar in Kuwait. His younger son Ayatollah Sayyed Mortadha Almohri is a former jurisprudence student and current representative (wakeel) of Ayatollah Sayyed Ali al-Sistani.
