= Rawan bin Hussain =

Kuwaiti social media influencer, actress, and singer

Rawan bin Hussain روان بن حسين
- Born: Rawan Abdullah; December 30, 1996 (age 29); Kuwait City, Kuwait
- Education: University of Westminster (Bachelor of Laws)
- Occupations: Social media influencer, actress, singer
- Years active: 2016–present

Rawan Abdullah known under the stage name of Rawan bin Hussain (Arabic: روان بن حسين), is a Kuwaiti social media influencer, actress, and singer. She is one of the most followed influencers in the region, with seven million followers on Instagram.

== Early life and education ==
She was born in Kuwait to a Kuwaiti father and Palestinian mother. She has four younger siblings. Her parents worked for the Ministry of Interior until retirement. She experienced bullying at school.

In 2014, she moved to the United States to study at the University of Southern California. She initially wanted to major in political science in California but she later decided to transfer to the United Kingdom. In 2015, she joined King's College London's International Foundation Program. In 2016, she started the University of Westminster's Bachelor of Laws program and graduated in 2019.

== Career ==
In June 2016, Vogue magazine (Middle East edition) named her the "Brooke Shields of Kuwait". In 2017, she founded the beauty cosmetics brand House of Rawan. She also authored the Arabic novel “no woman has ever loved” which was best selling at the Kuwait International Book Fair in 2017. In 2017 and 2018, she collaborated with international brands such as Gucci, Charlotte Tilbury, Maybelline, and Lancome. In October 2019, she was on the cover of Cosmopolitan Middle East.

In 2021, she began her music career. In 2022, she launched her acting career, starring in two Kuwaiti television shows on Netflix.

In early 2024, she also launched a beauty brand with an initial focus on cruelty-free products made with natural ingredients. In April 2024, she was the covergirl of Harper's Bazaar Arabia. In May 2024, she won the "Star of the Night" award at the EMIGALA 2024 award show. In fall 2024, she collaborated with New Balance Middle East as their brand ambassador. In December 2024, she was featured on the cover of Grazia magazine (Middle East).

== Personal life ==
In 2019, she married British-Libyan businessman Youssef Migariaf in London. She gave birth to their daughter in February 2020. In July 2020, she announced their divorce, accusing him of giving her a sexually transmitted disease allegedly contracted from a prostitute.

In July 2021, her mother died after a battle with an illness. She was suffering from kidney failure and lung failure, which led her to fall into a coma.

In 2024, she disclosed that her lupus diagnosis has resulted in significant changes to her diet and lifestyle.

=== Criminal convictions ===
In 2021, she was convicted in the UK for stalking her ex-husband and faced arrest in London after she failed to appear in court to face criminal charges related to stalking, harassing, and physically assaulting him. The British court convicted her of harassment and criminal damage, and she was banned from contacting her ex-husband and his family under a restraining order.

In March 2025, the government of Dubai sentenced her to six months in jail and deportation from the United Arab Emirates and fined her 20,000 dirhams (US$5,500) after she was convicted of public intoxication, assaulting police, and causing a riot. According to various media reports, her sentence was later extended beyond six months. She was released from prison in February 2026.

=== Other controversies ===
In July 2023, she was involved in a dispute with employees at Baghdad International Airport and subsequently denied entry into Iraq. In September 2023, she was reportedly involved in controversy in Saudi Arabia.

== Discography ==
=== Singles ===
List of singles as lead artist, with selected chart positions, showing year released
Title	Year	Peak chart positions
Title	Year	LBN
"Kan Ya Ma Kan"	2021	—
"La Teghannili"	2021	—
"Adios" (feat. Daffy)	2022	20
"Mishtaq"	2022	—
"Wehde Estesnaiya"	2022	19
"Ekhtary"	2022	—
"Malak Amal"	2023	—
"Ghairk Maleesh"	2023	—
"Ala Fekra"	2024	—
"Ya Oyoun"	2024	—
"Salamy"	2024	—
"Mish Hasmaak"	2026	—
"Kifak"	2026	—
"—" denotes a recording that did not chart in that territory.

== Acting career ==
Title	Character	Year
She's Gone with Water		2022
The Deep State		2023
