= Hamad al-Naqi =

Kuwaiti activist and blogger (born 1988)

- حمد النقي
- Born: c. 1988
- Known for: prisoner of conscience

Hamad al-Naqi (Arabic: حمد النقي, romanized: Ḥamad al-Naqī; born c. 1988) is a Kuwaiti activist and blogger who in June 2012 was sentenced to ten years' imprisonment on charges of provoking sectarian tensions and making blasphemous tweets against Muhammad. His arrest triggered international outcry from human rights organizations and world leaders.

== Criminal charges ==
Al-Naqi was arrested on 27 March 2012 and taken to Kuwait Central Prison. After he was stabbed in the neck by another inmate on 19 April, prison officials announced that they were putting al-Naqi in solitary confinement for his own protection.

During his trial, prosecutors told the court that his comments "were likely to stoke sedition within the community and mobilize segments alongside sectarian lines", Al-Naqi pleaded not guilty, contending that he had not posted the messages and that his account had been hacked. A judge found al-Naqi guilty on all charges—"insulting the Prophet, the Prophet's wife and companions, mocking Islam, provoking sectarian tensions, insulting the rulers of Saudi Arabia and Bahrain and misusing his mobile phone to spread the comments"— and on 4 June gave him the maximum prison sentence of ten years. His lawyer stated that al-Naqi intended to appeal.

Al-Naqi, who is a Kuwaiti Shi'ite, allegedly used Twitter to criticize the Sunni monarchies of Bahrain and Saudi Arabia, who were experiencing sectarian tensions during the Arab Spring-inspired Bahraini uprising.

== Reactions ==
Media commentators described al-Naqi's case as demonstrating "growing tensions between the country's Sunni majority and Shiite minority". Al-Naqi's sentence was protested by Human Rights Watch, which stated that "Kuwaiti authorities clearly violate international rights standards when they punish Hamad al-Naqi for criticizing neighboring monarchs ... This harsh sentence appears designed to intimidate other Kuwaitis from exercising their right to freedom of expression." Amnesty International designated al-Naqi a prisoner of conscience and called for his immediate and unconditional release. A spokeswoman stated that "criticizing religion is a protected form of expression and should not be criminalized ... Nor should individuals be subject to imprisonment for insulting heads of state or other public figures or institutions." The Arabic Network for Human Rights Information denounced the blasphemy charge against al-Naqi as a "cover-up" and an excuse to "gag" political opponents.

== See also ==
- Nasser Abul
