= Ibtihal Al-Khatib =

Kuwait academic, activist and journalist

- ابتهال الخطيب
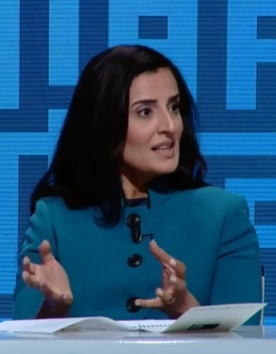
- Ibtihal Al-Khatib at The Munathara Initiative, January 2017.
- Born: 15 February 1972 (age 54)
- Occupations: Academic, journalist, and prominent advocate of secular liberal values in Arab society

Ibtihal Al-Khatib (Arabic: ابتهال الخطيب, born 15 February 1972) is a Kuwaiti academic, journalist, and prominent advocate of secular liberal values in Middle Eastern societies. She is a professor at the Kuwait University in the department of English Language and Literature. She has been the subject of controversy because of her outspoken defense of secularism, separation of church and state, and civil rights, including gay rights.

== Bibliography ==
Lichter, Ida (2009). Muslim Women Reformers: Inspiring Voices Against Oppression. Amherst (NY): Prometheus Books.
