= Ahmed Mousa Mirza =

Kuwaiti footballer

Personal information
- Full name: Ahmed Mousa Mirza
- Date of birth: October 23, 1976 (age 50)
- Place of birth: Kuwait
- Height: 1.76 m (5 ft 9 1/2 in)
- Position: Attacking midfielder

Youth career
- 1985–1986: Al Arabi
- 1986–1987: Al Qadsia
- 1987–1991: Al Arabi

Senior career*
Years	Team	Apps	(Gls)
1991–2011	Al Arabi	?	(?)
2007–2009	→Al Naser (Loan)		

International career^{‡}
2000–2001	Kuwait	7	(0)
- * Club domestic league appearances and goals as of October 9, 2010 ‡ National team caps and goals as of October 9, 2010

Ahmed Mousa Mirza (Arabic: أحمد موسى, (born 23 October 1976) is a Kuwaiti retired footballer who was an attacking midfielder for the Kuwaiti Premier League club Al Arabi.
