= Al-Kandari =

Family from Kuwait

Al-Kandari is a family name in Kuwait of Iranian/Persian origin. Unlike some cohesive clans in the region that trace their lineage to a single ancestor, the Kandari name encompasses loosely connected families. Each branch may descend from different grandfathers, but most families are believed to have arrived in Kuwait around the same period. The surname derives from the early members who worked as kanadra (water carriers).

The Al-Kandari are regarded as a sizable Kuwaiti family composed of various sub-families, not all of whom are directly related. They are primarily of Sunni Muslim ancestry, with roots traced back several centuries. Historical accounts suggest that their ancestors migrated from southern Iran.

== Immigration to Kuwait ==
The Al-Kandari name was first established in Kuwait, and most members trace their origin to the country from around the late 19th century.

== Notable members ==
- Abdulkarim Al-Kanderi, a member of the Kuwait National Assembly. He was first elected in 2013.
- Mohammed Al-Kandari, also a member of the Kuwait National Assembly. He was first elected in 2008.
- Abdullah Kamel Al-Kandari, repatriated to Kuwait on 9 September 2006. He faced charges in Kuwait after his return and was acquitted.
- Hanadi Al-Kandari, a Kuwaiti actress and presenter.
- Ali Al-Kandari, a professor of history at Kuwait University, specialising in Islamist movements, social transformations, and the contemporary history of the Gulf.
- Bader Abdullah Al-Kandari, former Vice Chairman of Wafra International Company and Non-Executive Director at the Bank of London and the Middle East.
- Anas Al Kandari, a militant who, along with Jassem al-Hajiri, attacked United States Marines during a training exercise on Failaka Island in October 2002. Lance Corporal Antonio J. Sledd was killed and another Marine was injured. Both Anas Al-Kandari and al-Hajiri were killed in the incident.
- Abdullah Kamel Al-Kandari and Fayiz Al-Kandari, two Kuwaitis who travelled to Afghanistan for humanitarian purposes. Both were detained at the Guantanamo Bay detention camp after their names appeared on a list of "324 known aliases".
- Fayiz Al-Kandari, held at Guantanamo Bay from 2002 to 2016. In May 2015, Sheikh Mohammad Al-Khaled Al-Hamad Al-Sabah, then Kuwaiti Minister of Interior and Deputy Prime Minister, travelled to Washington, D.C. to advocate for his release. Following his release, Fayiz gave televised interviews about his experiences in Guantanamo, including a 2020 series titled "A Promise Before the Departure" and a 2021 interview on Al-Qabas TV's programme "The Black Box". He also published a book titled Severe Affliction and New Birth.

== Presence outside Kuwait ==
Some Al-Kandari members have migrated to other Gulf Cooperation Council (GCC) countries, such as Bahrain and the United Arab Emirates, though little documentation exists on the scale or significance of these movements.

== Political significance ==
The political influence of the family stems in part from its size. While no official estimates are available, analysts of Kuwaiti parliamentary elections suggest that one or two seats in parliament may be influenced by members of the family. Unverified estimates place the number of Al-Kandari members in Kuwait at around 50,000, though reliable sources rarely confirm such figures.
