= Fajer Al-Saeed =

Kuwaiti screenwriter and producer (born 1967)

- فجر السعيد
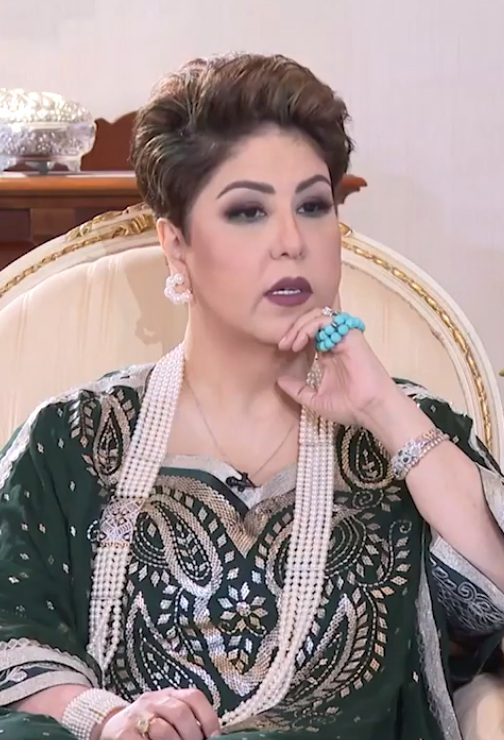
- Fajer Alsaeed, NXT Platform, 21 April 2021
- Born: 23 September 1967 (age 58)
- Years active: 1997–present
- Notable work: TV script writer, Producer and TV presenter

Fajer Othman Al-Saeed (Arabic: فجر عثمان السعيد; born 23 September 1967) is a Kuwaiti screenwriter, producer, and journalist.

== Biography ==
At the beginning, Fajer Al-Saeed was writing on the radio, but her fame started with the first work she wrote for television, the series "The last decision" (original title: Al Qarar Al-Akheer). In addition to being a writer, she produces her own work through her company Scope Art Production. On 7 July 2007, she launched a television channel, Scope Channel affiliated with her company. At the present time, her company's work is not limited to producing works that she writes only, but has begun to expand since 2005 to produce works for other writers, Al-Saeed had stopped writing dramas since 2010.

=== Private life ===
Al-Saeed is the sister of Talal Al-Saeed, the former MP, poet and journalist. On 21 March 2010, she married the lawyer Saud Al-Subaie.

=== TV presenting ===
In November 2018, she experimented with TV presenting on her channel Scope, in the political variety program "Here’s Kuwait" (original title: Hona Al-Kuwait). In Ramadan 2019, She presented the program “Scope gathering” (original title: Ghabgah Scope).

== Controversies ==
On New Year's Eve 2019, Al-Saeed called for the normalization of relations with Israel and the investment of Arab capital in it, as she added in her tweet on Twitter: "I expect the New Year 2019, God willing, will be a year of goodness, security and safety, and on this happy occasion, I like to say to you, I strongly support normalization with the State of Israel, opening up trade with it, introducing Arab capital for investment and opening up tourism, especially religious tourism, Al-Aqsa, the Dome of the Rock and the Church of the Resurrection".

On 9 January 2019, Al-Saeed had an interview with the Israeli Kan channel and repeated her call for normalization and about "peace between the Arab peoples and Israel".

She also criticized rocket launches by Palestinian militants on 14 March 2019, during clashes between Gaza and Israel.

Al-Saeed sparked controversy on social media in a video on her personal account in September 2024 in Georgia, describing the two Israelis she was standing with as “cousins.”

On 9 January 2025, she was placed under investigation in her country and sentenced to 21 days of detention for advocating normalization with Israel.

== Disease ==
In July 2019, she suffered a blood poisoning after undergoing gastric bypass surgery, which led to severe internal bleeding, as she was transferred to the hospital and was admitted to the recovery room in a critical condition.

== Works ==
production year	Name	Kind	Type	Directed by
1997	Al Qarar Al-Akheer	Series	Family Drama	Abdulaziz Al-Mansour Al-Arfaj
1998	Darat Al-Ayam	Series	Family Drama	Abdulaziz Al-Mansour Al-Arfaj
1999	Droob Al-Shak	Series	Family Drama	Abdulaziz Al-Mansour Al-Arfaj
2001	Jareh Al-Zaman	Series	Social Drama	Amer Al-Hamoud
2002	Thaman Omry	Series	Social Drama	Abdullah Al-Barrak
2002	Qanas Khytan	Play	Social Comedy	Ahmed Al-Salman
2002	Dar Al-Falak	Radio play	Satirical Comedy	Abdullah Al-Barrak
2003	Al-Hayalah	Series	Family Comedy	Al-Bailey Ahmed
2004	Dunya Al-Qwy	Series	Social Drama	Al-Bailey Ahmed
2005	Adeel Al-Roh	Series	Political Drama	Ramadan Ali
2006	Al-imbratorah	Series	Police Drama	Nour Aldawi
2008	Dar Al-hwa	Series	Family Drama	Faraj Al-Faraj
2009	Sotk wasel	Series	Political Comedy	Faraj Al-Faraj
2009	Aamk Asmakh	Series	Political Comedy	Faraj Al-Faraj
2010	Sotk wasel 2	Series	Political Comedy	Faraj Al-Faraj
