= Alrai TV =

TV channel in Kuwait

Alrai TV is a private Kuwaiti satellite TV channel. Launched in 2004, it is part of Al Rai Media Group, which publishes Al Rai, a daily newspaper in Kuwait.

It is the first private television channel in Kuwait.

The current head manager is Waleed Al-Jasem.
