= Kuwaiti Arabic =

Variety of Gulf Arabic spoken in Kuwait

- كويتي
- Pronunciation: [kweːti]
- Native to: Kuwait, Iraq (Bedouin regions)
- Native speakers: 1.7 million (2024)
- Language family: Afro-Asiatic: Semitic; West Semitic; Central Semitic; Arabic; Peninsular; Gulf; Kuwaiti Arabic
- Writing system: Arabic, with addition of 3 or 4 letters.

Official status
- Official language in: Not official in any country
- Regulated by: Not recognised as a language

Language codes
- ISO 639-1: afb
- ISO 639-3: afb
- Glottolog: kuwa1251

Kuwaiti (Arabic: كويتي, romanized: Kuwaytī, [kweːti]) is a Gulf Arabic dialect spoken in Kuwait. Kuwaiti Arabic shares many phonetic features unique to Gulf dialects spoken in the Arabian Peninsula. Due to Kuwait's soap opera industry, knowledge of Kuwaiti Arabic has spread throughout the Arabic-speaking world and become recognizable even to people in countries such as Tunisia and Jordan.

== History and development ==
Kuwaiti Arabic speakers exhibit features not found in Modern Standard Arabic (MSA), due in part to natural linguistic change over time, influence from nearby dialects in Iraq and Saudi Arabia, as well as influence from English, Italian, Persian, Turkish, as well as Hindi-Urdu and Swahili. Three groups make up the Kuwaiti population: the descendants of people from the Arabian Peninsula, Iraq, and Iran.

Kuwaiti Arabic is rapidly changing due to many factors, in particular contact with speakers of other languages and other Arabic varieties.

== Phonology ==
Kuwaiti Arabic has three short vowels /a i u/ and five long vowels /a: e: i: o: u:/. Short [e] and [o] appear in some words, typically as allophones (such as word-final /a/, which raises to [e]), though their phonemicity is marginal and many of the words they appear in are loans from other languages.

Kuwaiti Arabic consonants
		Labial	Dental	Denti-alveolar		Palatal	Velar	Uvular	Pharyngeal	Glottal
		Labial	Dental	^{plain}	^{emphatic}	Palatal	Velar	Uvular	Pharyngeal	Glottal
Nasal		m		n						
Occlusive	voiceless	(p)		t	tˤ	tʃ	k	q		ʔ
Occlusive	voiced	b		d	(dˤ)	dʒ	ɡ			
Fricative	voiceless	f	θ	s	sˤ	ʃ	x		ħ	h
Fricative	voiced	(v)	ð	z	ðˤ		ɣ		ʕ	
Trill				r						
Approximant				l		j	w			

Consonants in parentheses are marginal, found exclusively in formal, educated speech or from loanwords. Similarly, the glottal stop [ʔ] is rare, occurring in borrowings from Modern Standard Arabic.

/ɡ/ and /tʃ/ are the Kuwaiti Arabic reflexes of Classical Arabic *q ([q] in MSA) and *k ([k] in MSA), respectively. /ɡ/ may also be fronted to /dʒ/ in the context of front vowels.12

/v/ appears exclusively in loanwords from English; speakers may have difficulty with this sound and replace it with [f].

Emphatic consonants are pronounced with simultaneous velarization or pharyngealization; like MSA and other Arabic dialects, Kuwaiti Arabic makes phonemic contrasts between emphatic and non-emphatic consonants, though AlBader identifies allophonic emphaticization of /b f l m n r/, which become [bˤ fˤ lˤ mˤ nˤ rˤ] when they come before a long /a:/ or when they are in close proximity to an emphatic consonant or back vowel.

== Varieties ==
Kuwaiti Arabic is divided into two varieties: Urban and Bedouin; the latter is considered to be more linguistically conservative, while the former, associated largely with sedentary urban speakers, has novel features not shared by surrounding dialects and is considered to be more prestigious. The urban dialect originates from the spoken dialect of Arabian Peninsular Arabic speakers who migrated to the area in the 18th century, being strongly influenced by contact with and immigration from the outside world.

The Urban speech is divided into four sub-dialects, while the Bedouin dialect is divided into two. The four sedentary dialects are:

- Sharq: Mainly used by Ajam, who settled the district. It is a result of a mixture of the various different dialects spoken in Kuwait in the past. (See also Sharq)
- Jibla (See also Jibla)
- Failicha (See also Failaka Island)
- Fintaas (See also Fintaas, Kuwait)

While the two Bedouin varieties are:

- Jahra (See also Jahra, Kuwait)
- Dimna: Used mainly by the descendants of Al-Azmi tribe. Dimna is the old name of Salmiya City, Kuwait

Historians and researchers usually demonstrate differences between the dialects using /sukkar/, the Kuwaiti word for "sugar", which has three different pronunciations depending on the speaker's dialect. It is pronounced ([ʃɪkər]) in Sharq dialect, Shakar ([ʃəkər]) in Fintaas dialect, and Shakir ([ʃakɪr]) in Jibla dialect.

== Status ==
Dashti identifies four varieties of Arabic in Kuwait. Classical Arabic (CA), the language of the Quran, the liturgical language of Islam, the religion of the vast majority of Kuwaitis, and old Arabic literature, Modern Standard Arabic (MSA), which is the medium of formal communication and school education. This variety is considered the second language of Kuwaitis as they are only introduced to when they start school. Kuwaiti Arabic (KA), the language of everyday's life and the symbol of the Kuwaiti identity. It is a symbol of prestige in the Kuwaiti society. The last variety is Educated Standard Arabic (ESA), in which the speaker mixes between MSA and KA. This language is used in Radio, TV, and academics' informal discussions. Kuwait is diglossic, like the rest of the Arab world, with the Arabic language being seen as the high variety, while Kuwaiti is seen more like a patois or a low-variety colloquial dialect of Arabic.

Kuwaiti is the "normal" way of speaking in everyday's life and is acquired naturally at home and not taught at schools (as it is considered a mere dialect of the Arabic language by the public).

After conducting several interviews with speakers of Kuwaiti, Akbar states that for many, speaking Kuwaiti is the most important criterion of being considered Kuwaiti.

== Features and characteristics ==
Kuwaiti Arabic is a variant of Gulf Arabic, sharing similarities with the dialects of neighboring coastal areas in Eastern Arabia. Due to immigration during its early history as well as trade, Kuwaiti was influenced by many languages such as Persian, English, Italian, Urdu, Turkish, and others.

A characteristic in Kuwait is the use of words and phrases by women exclusively, for example "يَا حَافِظ", roughly translated to "Oh Saver [God]", is rarely or never used by men. It also differs from other Arabic variants in the way phonological assimilation occurs to a multitude of words, but not to all of them. The only case of full assimilation is /dˤ/ changing to /ðˤ/ in all words.

== Differences between Standard Arabic and Kuwaiti ==
Each colloquial variety of Arabic has evolved and developed over time from earlier Arabic dialects. In addition to the phonological differences mentioned above, some of the grammatical differences between the Standard Arabic (MSA) and Kuwaiti Arabic are:

- Kuwaiti uses SVO more often (unless the subject is omitted because of the verb's conjugation), while Modern Standard Arabic uses VSO most of the time. There may be a relationship between definiteness and pragmatic factors that control the choice of VSO vs. SVO in Kuwaiti and other Arabic varieties.
- Copulas are used in Kuwaiti, unlike Arabic. Below is a table of copulas used in Kuwaitis:

Note: Copulas are used before verbs only, not adjectives. For example: I am drinking, not I ~~am~~ drunk. Many linguists define copulas as expressing identity and "is-a" relations. Since the following "copulas" are only use before verbs, they may be classified as aspectual particles.

Verb	In Kuwaiti	Transliteration
am, is	قَعَ/قَامْ/قَاعِدْ/قَاعْ/قَعْدْ	[ɡəʕ, [ɡam], [ɡaʕɪd], [ɡaʕ], [ɡəʕd]
are	قَعَ/قَامْ/قَاعْدِينْ/قَاعْ/قَعْدْ	[ɡəʕ, [ɡam], [ɡaʕdin], [ɡaʕ], [ɡəʕd]

The past tenses are formed by adding كَانْ kaːn before each copula.

- Almost all of Arabic declensions are omitted in Kuwaiti.
- Dual grammatical person is not used, though dual nouns are still used.
- Feminine forms in plural second and third person are not used.
- The definite article, al- ([al]), became el- ([ɪl]-) in Kuwaiti.

== Lexicon ==
Kuwaiti has borrowed many words from other languages due to immigration and trade. Below are few examples with the corresponding Arabic words. As noticed, many words come from Turkish. This is due to the historical influence of Ottomans that ruled over neighboring regions.

Note: A green box indicates that the MSA word is used in Kuwaiti (most of the time interchangeably), while a red box means it is not.

Word	Pronunciation	Meaning	Origin	In Original Language	In Modern Standard Arabic
دِقْمَة or دُقْمَة	[dɪɡ.mə] or [dʉ́ɡ.mə]	'button'	Turkish	düğme	زِر
شِگرْدِي	[ʃɪɡərdɪ]	'kind-hearted person'	Persian	شگردي	طَيِّب
بَخْت and بَخَتْ	[bəxt] and [bəxæt]	'luck'	Persian	بخت	حَظ
وَايِر	[wajɪr]	'wire'	English	wire	سِلْك
دَبَل	[dəbəl]	'double'	English	double	مزدوج or ثنائي
أَصَنْصير	[əsˤən.sˤeːr]	'elevator'	French	ascenseur	مِصْعَد
تِيلَة	[tiːlə]	'marble [toy]'	Persian	تیله	العَاب الكُرَة
كِتِر	[kɪtɪr]	'quarters'	English	quarter	مكان or زاوية
جيكَر	[dʒeːkər]	'ugly' (often used humorously)	English	joker, from the playing card	قبيح (lacks humorous meaning)
رزنامة	[rɪznamə]	'calendar'	Persian	روزنامه	تقويم
شوُرْبَة or شورُبَة	[ʃoːrbə] or [ʃoːrʉ́bə]	'soup'	Turkish	çorba	حَسَاء
صَالون	/sˤaloːn/	'lounge'	French	salon	ردهة
طرْشِي	[tˤʊrʃi]	'pickle'	Turkish	turşu	مُخَلَّل
نَمْرَة or نِمْرَة	[nɪmrə] or [nəmrə]	'phone number'	Persian	نمره	رقم
بنْك or بَّنْگ	[bəŋk] or [bʌŋg]	'bank'	English	bank	مَصْرِف
يَواشْ يَواش	[jəwaʃ] or [jəwaʃ]	'slow down/be careful'	Turkish	yavaş	تَمَهَّل
طوز	[tˤoːz]	'sandstorm'	Turkish	toz	عاصفة غبارية/عاصفة ترابية
تلفزيون	[tĭlfvɪzjɔ́n] or [təlvɪzjɔ́n]or [tĭlɪfɪzjɔ́n]	'television'	English	television	تلفاز
كمْبِيُوتَرْ	[kɪ́mbjutar]	'computer'	English	computer	حاسوب
دِرِيشَة	[dɪrɪ́jʃə]	'window'	Persian	دريچه	نافذة
زبالة	[ɪ́zbalə] or [zubalə]	'garbage/trash'	Persian	زباله	قمامة or نفاية
صالَة	[sˤalˤaːh]	'living room'	Spanish	sala	غرفة المعيشة
جُوتي (pl. جُواتي)	[ʤʉ́ti (pl.ʤʉ́waːti ]	'shoe(s)'	Hindi	جوتا	حذاء (pl. أحذية)
أُوتي	[ʉ́ti]	'flatiron'	Turkish	ütü	مكواة
أَبَجوْرَة	[abajɔ́rə]	'lampshade'	French	abat-jour	عاكس الضوء
ميز تُواليْت	[mɛ́z twaːlɛ́t]	'dresser/makeup table/toilette'	Persian	ميز توالت	تسريحة
أكو (conj. شكو، ماكو)	[akʉ́ (conj.ʃakʉ́, makʉ́]	'there is (there isn't, what is there? [often also "no way!" in exclamation.])'	Akkadian	-	يوجد
دِكّان	[dɪkːkɑ́ːn]	'store'	Persian	دكان	محل
بَّنْكَة	[bʌŋkːah]	'fan'	Hindi	پنکها	مروحة
سِيْدَة	[sɪ́jdːah]	'straight/straight ahead'	Hindi	سیدها	مستقيم
أَبْلَّة	[ʌbːxʲah]	'female teacher'	Turkish	abla	معلمة
بخشيش	[baxːʃɪ́ʃ]	'tip (as in tipping at a restaurant)'	Turkish	bahşiş	
قوزي	[k̚ʉ́zɪ] or ɣʉ́zɪ	'*regional lamb dish made of whole lamb*'	Turkish	kuzu	
هم	[həm]	'also'	Persian	هم	أيضًا
كنْديْشِن	[candēshin]	'air conditioner'	English	air conditioner	مكيف
فِنگر	[fingar]	'to kick something with one's toes'	English	finger	رفسة
شُوت	[ʃuːt]	'to kick (a ball, or in martial arts, etc.)'	English	shoot	ركلة
خَزْ	[xəz]	'stare'	Turkish	gözü	حدق
گز	[ɡəz]	'to meander'	English	gaze	ْنظر

=== Old-fashioned or obsolete words ===
some words were replaced by native Arabic words over time. A few examples of such words include:

- رنق (ring), A Persian word that means colour.
- خاتون (ḵātūn) "female nurse", from Turkish word meaning "noble woman", now replaced with سستر (sister), from English.
- بنسل (binsil), from English Pencil.
- كرفاية (karfāya), from Hindi.

Dr. Ya'goob al-Ghaneem points at the increasing numbers of Arab expatriate and exposure to media in different Arabics as the reasons behind this change. Fatima Mahasin hypothesises that the words being replaced are not of English, French or Italian origins, and tend originate from "less-prestigious" languages.

== See also ==
- Arabic language
- Gulf Arabic

== Bibliography ==
- Abd-el-Jawad, Hassan R.S. (1992). "Is Arabic a pluricentric language?". In Clyne, Michael G. (ed.). Pluricentric Languages: Differing Norms in Different Nations. pp. 261–305. ISBN 9783110128550.
- AlBader, Yousef B. (2015). Semantic Innovation and Change in Kuwaiti Arabic: A Study of the Polysemy of Verbs (PDF) (Ph.D.). Cardiff University.
- Al-Dashti, Abdulmuhsin (1997). Language choice in the state of Kuwait: A sociolinguistic investigation (Ph.D.). University of Essex.
- Mahsain, Fatima (2014). Motivations Behind Code-switching Among Kuwaiti Bilingual Schools' Students (PDF) (Ph.D.). University of Manchester.
- Mansfield, Peter (1990). Kuwait: Vanguard of the Gulf. Hutchinson. ISBN 9780091736040.
- Taqi, Hanan (2010). Two ethnicities, three generations: Phonological variation and change in Kuwait (PDF) (PhD). Newcastle University. Archived from the original (PDF) on 19 October 2013.
