= 2024 Kuwaiti general election =

- 4 April 2024
- 50 of the 65 seats in the National Assembly
- Turnout: 62.10% (▲2.83pp)
Party	Vote %	Seats	+/–
Salafi Alliance	3.41	3	0
Hadas	3.36	1	−2
Taalof	3.18	2	0
Hashd	3.09	2	+1
Thawabit Al-Umma	3.03	2	+1
KDF	0.98	1	+1
Justice and Peace Alliance	0.86	1	+1
Independents	82.08	38	−2
This lists parties that won seats. See the complete results below.
Results by constituency

Snap general elections were held in Kuwait on 4 April 2024 to elect 50 of the 65 members of the National Assembly. The election came after the dissolution of the National Assembly elected in 2023 on 15 February 2024 due to an MP allegedly insulting Emir Mishal Al-Ahmad. The elections were the first to be held during Mishal Al-Ahmad's reign and the fourth election held within four years.

== Electoral system ==
The 50 elected members of the National Assembly were elected from five ten-seat constituencies by single non-transferable vote. Political parties are not officially licensed meaning candidates formally run as independents, although many political groups operate freely as de facto political parties. All Kuwaiti citizens above the age of 21 have the right to vote.

=== Constituencies ===
Since 2006 Kuwait has been divided into five multi-member constituencies for the election of members to the unicameral National Assembly. These five electoral districts represent 112 residential areas distributed among the six governorates of Kuwait. Regardless of the amount of electorates, all constituencies directly elects 10 representatives to the National Assembly, for a total of 50 elected members out of 65.

Constituency	2024 Electorate	Seats
First	104,038	10
Second	95,302	10
Third	143,693	10
Fourth	220,932	10
Fifth	270,768	10

== Candidates ==
Any Kuwaiti-born citizen who is 30 years of age on election day, who is able to read and write in Arabic and has not been convicted of a felony or a crime involving breach of honor or trust is eligible to run for office. On 22 June 2016 parliament passed a law banning any citizen who had insulted the emir from running, resulting in several major opposition figures including Musallam Al-Barrak becoming ineligible candidates. All registered candidates need to pay a registration fee of fifty Kuwaiti dinars (about US$162.50).

Registration of candidates took place between 4 and 13 March 2024. A total of 255 candidates registered to contest the elections.

=== Female candidates ===
Fourteen women registered to run in the 2023 election, the lowest since the 2016 election. The only female MP during the 17th session, Jenan Boushehri, re-ran for office. Eight female candidates ran in the Third Constituency, two candidates ran in the Second and Fourth constituencies, and only one ran in the First and Fifth.

=== Secularist blocs ===
Two Kuwait Democratic Forum-affiliated members are running in the current election. Mohammed Jawhar Hayat in the first constituency and Saud Al-Babtain in the second constituency.

=== Populist blocs ===
The Popular Action Bloc led by former MP Musallam Al-Barrak announced three candidates for this election. Basel Al-Bahrani in the first constituency, Mutib Al-Rathaan of the fourth constituency and Mohammad Al-Dossari in the fourth constituency.

=== Sunni Islamist blocs ===
Hadas, an offshoot of the Muslim Brotherhood, decided to field four candidates in four different constituencies. Mohammad Al-Matar replacing Osama Al-Shaheen in the first constituency. Hamad Almatar and Abdulaziz Al-Saqabi will rerun in the second and third constituencies respectively. Muaath Al-Duwaila, son of former MP Mubarak Al-Duwaila, will run in the fourth constituency.

The Islamic Salafi Alliance have four candidates in this election. Three of these candidates were in the last session, Fahad Al-Masoud of the second constituency, Hamad Al-Obaid of the third, and Mubarak Al-Tasha of the fourth. Abdullah Al-Kandari will run in the fifth constituency for the Salafi Alliance. The salafist group, Thawabit Al-Umma, will have two candidates running in the elections. Current MP Mohammed Hayef al-Mutairi and the recently exonerated Bader Al-Dahoum.

=== Shia Islamist blocs ===
The Justice and Peace Alliance, affiliated with the Shirazi Shiite school, registered two candidates Saleh Ashour in the first constituency and Khalil Al-Saleh in the second constituency. Taalof, a group that broke off from the National Islamic Alliance, have registered three candidates including two who were in the last session. Their three candidates are Ahmed Lari of the first constituency, Abdullah Ghandfar of the third constituency and Hani Shams of the fifth constituency.

== Conduct ==
The election was the second in Kuwait to be held during Ramadan. Polling opened at 12:00 and closed at midnight. Around 834,000 citizens were eligible to vote. Sheikh Mishal called for a high turnout, saying that those who boycott the election were relinquishing their constitutional right.

== Results ==
Results showed that opposition politicians maintained their majority in the National Assembly, retaining the 29 seats (out of 50) that it had won in the last election. One female candidate was elected, the same as in the previous election, while Shia MPs won eight seats, an increase of one. The Islamic Constitutional Movement, a local branch of the Muslim Brotherhood, saw its seats decrease from three to one. Eleven MPs lost their bids for reelection. Analysts said that the election result would mean a continuation of the political dispute between Sheikh Mishal and parliament, which during its upcoming term, is expected to rule on the nomination of a crown prince.

The Kuwaiti Information Ministry said that turnout in the election was at 62%.

Party	Votes	%	Seats	+/–
Islamic Salafi Alliance	17,529	3.41	3	0
Islamic Constitutional Movement	17,267	3.36	1	−2
National Islamic Alliance (Taalof)	16,320	3.18	2	0
Popular Action Bloc	15,886	3.09	2	+1
Thawabit Al-Umma	15,577	3.03	2	New
Kuwait Democratic Forum	5,041	0.98	1	New
Justice and Peace Alliance	4,415	0.86	1	+1
Independents	421,494	82.08	38	−3
Total	513,529	100.00	50	0
Valid votes	513,529	99.07		
Invalid/blank votes	4,836	0.93		
Total votes	518,365	100.00		
Registered voters/turnout	834,733	62.10		
Source: Al Qabas, Al Araby

=== By constituency ===
Candidate	Party	Votes	%	Notes
First constituency
Osama Zaid Al-Zaid	Independent	4,936	7.99	Re-elected
Abdullah Jassem Al-Mudhaf	Independent	4,729	7.66	Re-elected
Mohammed Johar Hayat	Kuwait Democratic Forum	4,134	6.69	Elected
Ahmed Lari	National Islamic Alliance (Taalof)	4,108	6.65	Re-elected
Essa Al-Kandari	Independent	3,678	5.95	Re-elected
Basel Hussein Al-Bahrani	Popular Action Bloc	3,631	5.88	Elected
Adel Jassim Al-Damkhi	Independent	3,530	5.72	Re-elected
Khaled Marzouq Al-Ameera	Independent	3,502	5.67	Re-elected
Saleh Ashour	Justice and Peace Alliance	3,399	5.50	Elected
Mohammed Barrak Al-Azmi	Independent	3,249	5.26	Elected
Hamad Al-Midlij	Independent	3,095	5.01	Unseated
Ali Hassan Jaafar	Independent	2,637	4.27	
Mohammed Al-Matar	Islamic Constitutional Movement	2,355	3.81	
Ali Hussein Ali Al-Mousa	Independent	2,216	3.59	
Ahmed Khalifa Rashid Mohammed Al-Shahoumi	Independent	2,093	3.39	
Ali Falah Al-Sabri	Independent	1,935	3.13	
Abdul Samad Mustafa Sayed Zahid	Independent	1,525	2.47	
Ali Abdul Rahman Al-Kandari	Independent	1,460	2.36	
Maitham Abdullah Abdul Redha Mohammed Awad	Independent	1,412	2.29	
Abdullah Mohammed Abdul Rahman Abdul Mohsen Al-Tariji	Independent	1,369	2.22	
Abdullah Marzouq Al-Rumi	Independent	1,014	1.64	
Abdullah Abdul Wahab Al Haraz	Independent	821	1.33	
Nasser Mohammed Al-Nasrallah	Independent	443	0.72	
Abdul Wahab Abdul Rahman Al Kandari	Independent	256	0.41	
Abdullah Mohammed Al-Mutairi	Independent	46	0.07	
Fatima Khaled Karam	Independent	29	0.05	
Issa Hajji Musa	Independent	27	0.04	
Mustafa Yacoub Youssef Behbehani	Independent	23	0.04	
Ibrahim Mohammed Al Balushi	Independent	19	0.03	
Abdullah Abdul Hussein Muzaffar	Independent	17	0.03	
Walid Ahmed Al-Qabandi	Independent	16	0.03	
Hamza Abbas Al-Erian	Independent	16	0.03	
Fakhri Hashem SayedFakhri Sayyed Rajab	Independent	14	0.02	
Ali Kazem bin Zaid	Independent	11	0.02	
Jirah Ali Nour	Independent	6	0.01	
Abdul Rahman Mohammed Al-Ajmi	Independent	5	0.01	
Abdul Rahman Khalawi Al-Shamali	Independent	4	0.01	
Mohammed Sanad Hanif	Independent	3	0.00	
Fahd Abdullah Muzeal	Independent	2	0.00	
Abdullah Ali Al-Khabaz	Independent	1	0.00	
Total		61,766	100.00	
Registered voters/turnout		104,038	–	
Second constituency
Marzouq Al-Ghanim	Independent	8,295	13.43	Re-elected
Shuaib Shabaan	Independent	6,325	10.24	Re-elected
Abdulwahab Aref Al-Issa	Independent	3,917	6.34	Re-elected
Falah Dhahi Al-Hajri	Independent	3,342	5.41	Re-elected
Mohammed Al-Mutair	Independent	3,246	5.26	Re-elected
Bader Nashmi Al-Enazi	Independent	3,238	5.24	Re-elected
Nawaf Bhaish Al-Azmi	Independent	3,064	4.96	Elected
Abdullah Turki Al-Anbaie	Independent	2,914	4.72	Re-elected
Bader Al-Mulla	Independent	2,758	4.47	Re-elected
Fahad Abdulaziz Al-Masoud	Islamic Salafi Alliance	2,708	4.39	Re-elected
Ahmed Mohammed Ahmed Al-Hamad	Independent	2,666	4.32	
Mansour Mazal Al Sarheed	Independent	2,505	4.06	
Hamad Almatar	Islamic Constitutional Movement	2,490	4.03	Unseated
Huwaidi Sahn Al-Hajri	Independent	2,075	3.36	
Hamed Mahri Alian Noman Al-Bathali	Independent	1,907	3.09	
Muthanna Ali Arboud Shannon Al-Rashed Al-Bathali	Independent	1,375	2.23	
Omar Al-Tabtabaee	Independent	1,296	2.10	
Thamer Khaled Farhan Radi Al-Enezi	Independent	1,271	2.06	
Hamad Hamoud Al-Shammari	Independent	1,244	2.01	
Khalil Al-Saleh	Justice and Peace Alliance	1,016	1.65	
Ali Al-Daqbaashi	Independent	990	1.60	
Saud Khaled Al-Babtain	Kuwait Democratic Forum	907	1.47	
Khaled Ayed Al-Anazi	Independent	884	1.43	
Youssef Abdul Razzaq Al-Fawzan	Independent	492	0.80	
Saad Khaled Khalaf Nasha Al-Fajji	Independent	379	0.61	
Fahd Samawi Al-Dhafairi	Independent	186	0.30	
Talal Ajeel Al-Shammari	Independent	122	0.20	
Abdul Wahab Anwar Al-Qattan	Independent	26	0.04	
Khaled Saad Al-Rashidi	Independent	22	0.04	
Shaima Nasser Al-Hajri	Independent	16	0.03	
Ahmed Mohammed Al-Ajmi	Independent	15	0.02	
Hazza Mutlaq	Independent	12	0.02	
Bashar Kazem Hassan Khalaf Ali	Independent	12	0.02	
Ali Adel Hussein	Independent	11	0.02	
Walid Khaled Shehab	Independent	9	0.01	
Mishal Saleh Al Marri	Independent	9	0.01	
Fahd Barjas Eid	Independent	5	0.01	
Abdullah Ali Abdulaziz	Independent	4	0.01	
Jaber Ali Al-Houli	Independent	2	0.00	
Total		61,755	100.00	
Registered voters/turnout		95,302	–	
Third constituency
Abdulkarim Al-Kanderi	Independent	9,428	11.18	Re-elected
Abdulaziz Tareq Al-Saqabi	Islamic Constitutional Movement	6,294	7.46	Re-elected
Muhalhal Khaled Al-Mudhaf	Independent	5,804	6.88	Re-elected
Faris Saad Al-Otaibi	Independent	5,737	6.80	Re-elected
Ahmed Al-Sadoun	Independent	5,250	6.22	Re-elected
Jarrah Khaled Al-Fouzan	Independent	5,238	6.21	Re-elected
Muhannad Al-Sayer	Independent	5,114	6.06	Re-elected
Ahmed Nabil Al-Fadhel	Independent	5,092	6.04	Elected
Jenan Boushehri	Independent	4,976	5.90	Re-elected
Hamad Adel Al-Obeid	Islamic Salafi Alliance	4,908	5.82	Re-elected
Hamad Abdulrrahman Al-Olayan	Independent	4,584	5.43	Unseated
Abdulwahab Al-Babtain	Independent	4,209	4.99	
Ibrahim Mohammed Ghuloum Mohammed Dashti	Independent	4,159	4.93	
Sadoon Al-Otaibi	Independent	4,153	4.92	
Abdullah Mustafa Ghazanfar	National Islamic Alliance (Taalof)	3,775	4.47	
Madi Ibrahim Al-Khamis	Independent	2,265	2.68	
Khaled Juma Al-Yassin	Independent	1,840	2.18	
Mohammed Badr Mohammed Abdel Wahab Ibrahim Al-Joaan	Independent	1,103	1.31	
Khaled Ibrahim Mazal Hazza Al-Salal	Independent	191	0.23	
Jassim Mohammed Dashti	Independent	60	0.07	
Suhaila Abdulaziz Al-Salem	Independent	54	0.06	
Alaa Shakir Faras	Independent	39	0.05	
Zahraa Faisal Al-Shirazi	Independent	15	0.02	
Fatima Hashem Ali	Independent	12	0.01	
Khaled Khairallah Mishari	Independent	11	0.01	
Khalifa Khalil Ibrahim Al-Tamimi	Independent	9	0.01	
Noura Jassim Mohammed Darwish Al-Darwish	Independent	8	0.01	
Abdul Rahman Mohammed Al-Ajmi	Independent	8	0.01	
Abdullah Talal Abdullah Samir Faza Al-Hindal	Independent	7	0.01	
Maryam Mohsen Al-Mutairi	Independent	6	0.01	
Hoda Shaheen Al Hammadi	Independent	5	0.01	
Mohammed Salem Hamad Rashid Al Marri	Independent	4	0.00	
Total		84,358	100.00	
Registered voters/turnout		143,693	–	
Fourth constituency
Shuaib Al-Muwaizri	Independent	15,663	11.00	Re-elected
Anwar Arrak Al-Dhaferi	Independent	8,646	6.07	Elected
Obaid Mohammed Al-Mutairi	Independent	8,141	5.72	Elected
Mohammad Awadh Al-Ruqaib	Independent	7,970	5.60	Re-elected
Mubarak Hammoud Al-Tasha	Islamic Salafi Alliance	7,707	5.41	Re-elected
Bader Sayyar Al-Shammari	Independent	7,552	5.30	Re-elected
Saad al-Khanfour al-Rasheedi	Independent	7,188	5.05	Re-elected
Fayez Ghanam Al-Jamhour	Independent	7,120	5.00	Re-elected
Mubarak Al-Hajraf	Independent	6,925	4.86	Re-elected
Mohammed Hayef al-Mutairi	Thawabit Al-Umma	6,473	4.55	Re-elected
Moaz Mubarak Fahd Ali Fahd Al-Duwailah	Islamic Constitutional Movement	6,128	4.30	
Abdullah Fahad Al-Enizi	Independent	5,958	4.19	Unseated
Musaid Mohammed Abdullah Mohammed Al-Qarifa Al-Mutairi	Independent	5,350	3.76	
Thamer Saad Ghaith Ghanem Julaidan Al-Suwait Al-Dhafiri	Independent	5,182	3.64	
Miteb Ayed Al-Rathaan	Popular Action Bloc	4,611	3.24	
Askar Al-Enezi	Independent	3,877	2.72	
Fawaz Thamer Mutlaq Abdullah Sultan Al-Jada'i Al-Mutairi	Independent	3,732	2.62	
Mohammed Mubarak Humaidan Abdullah Al-Fajji	Independent	3,520	2.47	
Mohammed Saad Ruwaished Rashid Al-Harbi	Independent	3,483	2.45	
Khalifa Mohammed Khalifa Mufarrej Al Khalifa	Independent	2,955	2.08	
Youssef Mohammed Al-Bathali	Independent	2,933	2.06	
Abdullah Nasser Al-Tajal	Independent	2,254	1.58	
Fahid Fahd Al Rashidi	Independent	1,774	1.25	
Nawaf Dahwi Al-Mutairi	Independent	1,737	1.22	
Fawaz Munshar Awad Dakhil Al-Dhafiri	Independent	1,480	1.04	
Thamer Mutheeb Marzouq Sheri Al-Abdali	Independent	1,257	0.88	
Brikan Majidil Mukayd Sumian Sulaymani	Independent	1,048	0.74	
Eid Shaman Ayid Eid Al-Adhilah Al-Mutairi	Independent	734	0.52	
Hassan Mohsen Al-Azmi	Independent	235	0.17	
Mohammed Badah Badhan Mahdi Al-Sulaymani	Independent	112	0.08	
Ahmed Nassar Mutlaq Al-Shariaan	Independent	79	0.06	
Ibrahim Adel Kamal	Independent	79	0.06	
Hamad Youssef Al-Jadi	Independent	67	0.05	
Abdullah Ahmed Ashkanani	Independent	52	0.04	
Mohammed Shenifi Mutlaq Hamad Al Majidi	Independent	51	0.04	
Nawal Saleh Abalkhail	Independent	39	0.03	
Fahima Nashmi Zamil Eiadat Al-Rashidi	Independent	33	0.02	
Faisal Abdel Reda Karam	Independent	30	0.02	
Bader Nasser Turki Mohammed Al-Mujawb	Independent	29	0.02	
Hussein Abdel Latif Al-Serafi	Independent	23	0.02	
Abdullah Salem Al-Shammari	Independent	22	0.02	
Yacoub Mohammed Johar	Independent	21	0.01	
Fawaz Eid Al-Habbala	Independent	19	0.01	
Bakr Badi Saleh Freej Al-Rashidi	Independent	17	0.01	
Mohammed Falah Al-Sulaili	Independent	16	0.01	
Sultan Mutani Abdullah Shafaka Ghazi Al-Shammari	Independent	16	0.01	
Mutlaq Eid Awad Majid Al-Anazi	Independent	13	0.01	
Abdul Rahman Abdul Hadi Al Hajri	Independent	8	0.01	
Total		142,359	100.00	
Registered voters/turnout		220,932	–	
Fifth constituency
Fahad Falah Al-Azmi	Independent	16,469	10.09	Re-elected
Hamdan Al-Azmi	Independent	14,211	8.70	Re-elected
Mutib Nasser Al-Sahali	Independent	11,055	6.77	Elected
Saud Al-Asfoor	Independent	10,643	6.52	Re-elected
Bader Al-Dahoum	Thawabit Al-Umma	9,104	5.58	Elected
Majed Mussaed Al-Mutairi	Independent	8,807	5.39	Re-elected
Abdullhadi Nasser Al-Ajmi	Independent	8,521	5.22	Re-elected
Hani Hussein Shams	National Islamic Alliance (Taalof)	8,437	5.17	Re-elected
Mohammed Musaed Al-Dawsari	Popular Action Bloc	7,644	4.68	Elected
Khaled Mohammad Al-Otaibi	Independent	7,343	4.50	Re-elected
Mohammed Al-Huwaila	Independent	6,953	4.26	Unseated
Mohammed Hussain Al-Ajmi	Independent	6,360	3.89	Unseated
Ayed Abu Khoussa	Independent	5,505	3.37	
Khaled Saree Saad Hadram Al Hajri	Independent	5,504	3.37	
Faisal Mohammed Ahmed Hassan Al-Kandari	Independent	5,080	3.11	
Abdullah Al-Barghash	Independent	4,547	2.78	
Fahd Amer Hamad Azeb Al-Ajmi	Independent	4,456	2.73	
Khaled Shakhir Ngheimesh Sharaan Al-Mutairi	Independent	2,720	1.67	
Khaled Abdullah Farraj Neef Al-Mutairi	Independent	2,634	1.61	
Jaber Khaled Al-Subaie	Independent	2,478	1.52	
Abdullah Mohammed Al-Kandari	Islamic Salafi Alliance	2,206	1.35	
Abdullah Ali Al-Sanad	Independent	2,080	1.27	
Ahmed Mohammed Mutlaq Hamoud Al-Otaibi	Independent	1,720	1.05	
Saud Patel Al-Ajmi	Independent	1,609	0.99	
Abdul Mohsen Ali Akbar	Independent	1,375	0.84	
Ayed Abdul Hadi Al-Ajmi	Independent	1,289	0.79	
Mubarak Fahd Al Hajri	Independent	1,101	0.67	
Saleh Nasser Al-Hajri	Independent	1,087	0.67	
Badi Hasyan Mohammed Al-Watayeb Al-Dosari	Independent	936	0.57	
Ghanem Abdullah Al-Hujailan	Independent	565	0.35	
Talal Mohammed Al-Azmi	Independent	296	0.18	
Sabah Adnan Ali	Independent	179	0.11	
Hamdan Ibrahim Al-Hamdan	Independent	165	0.10	
Hassan Mahmoud Ashkanani	Independent	46	0.03	
Ahmed Kamal Al-Din Al-Sulaimi	Independent	39	0.02	
Abeer Abdul Rahman Ali Abdullah Al Otaibi	Independent	33	0.02	
Yacoub Abdullah Al-Rifai	Independent	27	0.02	
Fawzi Saqr Fahd Al-Saqr	Independent	25	0.02	
Bader Fadel Karam	Independent	22	0.01	
Mohammed Abdul Amir Hussein	Independent	20	0.01	
Total		163,291	100.00	
Registered voters/turnout		270,768	–	
Source: Al Qabas, Al Araby

== Reactions ==
Sheikh Mishal expressed thanks to agencies and officials who were involved in organizing the election. He and Prime Minister Mohammad Sabah Al-Salem Al-Sabah also expressed his congratulations to the winners in the election.

Adel Al Asoomi, the Speaker of the Arab Parliament, congratulated Sheikh Mishal and the Kuwaiti government for the conduct and result of the election.

On 10 May Sheikh Mishal disbanded the parliament for the second time in 2024, also announcing he was suspending some articles of the constitution for up to four years and that he and members of the cabinet would be taking over the powers of the National Assembly.
