= 2023 Kuwaiti general election =

← 2022	6 June 2023	2024 →
- 50 of the 65 seats in the National Assembly
- Turnout: 59.27% (▼4.03pp)
Party	Vote %	Seats	+/–
Hashd	3.07	1	+1
Taalof	2.90	2	0
Salafi Alliance	2.80	3	+1
Hadas	2.35	3	0
Independents	87.90	41	0
This lists parties that won seats. See the complete results below.

Snap general elections were held in Kuwait on 6 June 2023 to elect 50 of the 65 members of the National Assembly. The elections took place following the annulment of the results of the 2022 snap elections by the Constitutional Court on 19 March 2023 and the redissolution of the 16th session on 2 May.

== Background ==
During the 16th legislative session, uncooperative MPs and ministers led to multiple no-confidence votes and several government resignations. Actions such as members sitting in ministers' seats in the parliament, led to ministers not attend sessions, which in turn resulted in a member-organized sit-in in the parliament building. This prompted Crown Prince Mishal Al-Ahmad to dissolve parliament on 2 August 2022.

Multiple former MPs and citizens appealed to the Constitutional Court to overturn the dissolution. On 19 March 2023 the court annulled the dissolution, but on 2 May 2023 Al-Ahmad dissolved parliament again.

== Electoral system ==
The 50 elected members of the National Assembly were elected from five ten-seat constituencies by single non-transferable vote. Political parties are not officially licensed meaning candidates formally run as independents, although many political groups operate freely as de facto political parties. All Kuwaiti citizens above the age of 21 have the right to vote.

=== Constituencies ===
Since 2006 Kuwait has been divided into five multi-member constituencies for the election of members to the unicameral National Assembly. These five electoral districts represent 112 residential areas distributed among the six governorates of Kuwait. Regardless of the amount of electorates, all constituencies directly elects 10 representatives to the National Assembly via plurality vote, for a total of 50 elected members out of 65.

Constituency	Electorate 2023	Seats
First	99,779	10
Second	90,394	10
Third	137,978	10
Fourth	208,740	10
Fifth	256,755	10

== Candidates ==
Any Kuwaiti-born citizen who is 30 years of age on election day, who is able to read and write in Arabic and has not been convicted of a felony or a crime involving breach of honor or trust is eligible to run for office. On 22 June 2016 parliament passed a law banning any citizen who had insulted the emir from running, resulting in several major opposition figures including Musallam Al-Barrak and Bader Al-Dahoum becoming ineligible candidates. All registered candidates need to pay a registration fee of fifty Kuwaiti Dinars (about US$163).

Registration of candidates took place between 5 and 14 May 2023. A total 252 candidates registered to contest the elections. However, the final ballots consisted of 207 candidates after 40 withdrawals and five candidates being excluded, the lowest number of candidates since the 1975 general elections.

=== Female Candidates ===
Fifteen women registered to run in the 2023 election, lowest since the 2016 election. The two females elected in the annulled 2022 session, Aliya Al-Khaled and Jenan Boushehri, re-ran. Four female candidates ran in the Second and Fourth constituencies, three ran in the First and Third, and only one ran in the most populous constituency, the Fifth.

== Campaign ==
Pro-Sabah Al-Khalid former MPs, like Obaid Al-Wasmi, alleged that the 2022 election were rigged. They demanded that the government to investigate the large number votes gained by opposition members like Khaled Al-Otaibi, Ahmed Al-Sadoun and Saud Al-Asfoor. Even though no evidence was brought up, it was their explanation for the massive turnover of opposition members in that election.

Opposition members allegedly stated that the annulment of the 2022 election was unconstitutional. Mohammed Al-Mutair appealed to the constitutional court to overturn its decision. They also dismissed allegations that the 2022 election was rigged. Opposition members urged their supporters to not boycott the current election. On 1 May four major opposition members Abdulkarim Al-Kanderi, Muhannad Al-Sayer, Muhalhal Al-Mudhaf and Abdullah Al-Mudhaf decided to run in the election without a campaign headquarter where they could organize daily rallies.

In terms of political groups, Hadas announced that Osama Al-Shaheen, Abdulaziz Al-Saqabi and Hamad Al-Matar were officially representing them in the election. While National Islamic Alliance (Taalof) announced that they had three representatives in the election, Ahmed Lari, Hani Shams and Abdullah Mustafa. Popular Action Bloc leader Musallam Al-Barrak officially supported Bassel Al-Bahrani, Mutib Al-Rathaan and Mohammed Al-Dossari.

== Conduct ==
Voting took place within 759 committees in 118 schools chosen by the Ministry of Education scattered around the nation. Multiple Kuwaiti NGOs, like the Kuwaiti Journalists Society and the Kuwaiti Transparency Society, observed the 2023 election.

=== Combating Vote Buying ===
Ministry of Interior announced that they opened a hotline regarding complaints of voter fraud or any vote-buying. On 28 May the Ministry announced that they arrested a network of brokers that helped two candidates to buy votes in the 2023 election. The network involved ten brokers led by a Pakistani immigrant. The brokers bought 600 votes in the Fifth constituency. On 4 June, two days before the election, authorities arrested four candidates and eight voters that sold their votes.

== Results ==
The trend of reducing turnout continued, with the turnout of 59% being four points lower than the previous elections. Opposition reformist lawmakers not tied to the ruling family won a majority of seats. Only one woman, Jenan Boushehri, was elected. Seven Shias were elected compared to nine in 2022. Shiite alliance Taalof kept their 2 seats, while the Shirazi group Justice and Peace Alliance lost all of their seats.

Sunni Islamists took a gain in seats with the Islamic Salafi Alliance getting a third seat. Also unaffiliated salafists Mohammed Hayef and Adel Al-Damkhi keeping their seats from the annulled 2022 session. Salafist Fayez Al-Jamhour returned to parliament after losing in 2022. All three Hadas representatives won in the 2023 elections.

38 members retained their seats from the annulled 2022 session, while two, Marzouq Al-Ghanim and Fayez Al-Jamhour, returned from the dissolved 2020 session. Leading to a rate of change of seats of only 24%. Ten new MPs were elected for the first time. The majority of former members allied with Sabah Al-Khalid and Marzouq Al-Ghanim including Obaid Al-Wasmi, Hamad Al-Harshani, and Sadoon Al-Otaibi lost the election.

Party	Votes	%	Seats
Popular Action Bloc	14,436	3.07	1
National Islamic Alliance (Taalof)	13,649	2.90	2
Islamic Salafi Alliance	13,191	2.80	3
Islamic Constitutional Movement	11,031	2.35	3
Justice and Peace Alliance	4,608	0.98	0
Independents	413,454	87.90	41
Total	470,369	100.00	50
Total votes	470,369	–	
Registered voters/turnout	793,646	59.27	
Source: alqabas

=== Elected members ===
Constituency	Candidate	Votes
First	Abdullah Jassem Al-Mudhaf	5,815
First	Osama Zaid Al-Zaid	4,570
First	Ahmed Haji Larry	3,738
First	Khaled Marzouq Al-Ameera	3,575
First	Hassan Abdullah Johar	3,560
First	Dawood Sulaiman Marafie	3,434
First	Essa Ahmad Al-Kandari	3,185
First	Hamad Mohammed Al-Medlej	2,888
First	Osama Essa Al-Shaheen	2,869
First	Adel Jassim Al-Damkhi	2,731
Second	Marzouq Ali Al-Ghanim	6,661
Second	Shuaib Shabaan	5,630
Second	Abdullah Turki Al-Anbaie	3,705
Second	Falah Dhahi Al-Hajri	3,265
Second	Mohammad Barrak Al-Mutair	3,091
Second	Abdulwahab Aref Al-Issa	3,031
Second	Bader Nashmi El-Enezi	2,752
Second	Fahad Abdulaziz Al-Masoud	2,652
Second	Hamad Mohammad Al-Matar	2,432
Second	Bader Hamed Al-Mulla	2,360
Third	Muhalhal Khaled Al-Mudhaf	7,268
Third	Ahmed Abdulaziz Al-Sadoun	6,325
Third	Abdulkareem Abdullah Al-Kandari	5,878
Third	Muhannad Talal Al-Sayer	5,772
Third	Abdulaziz Tareq Al-Saqabi	5,730
Third	Jenan Mohsen Boushehri	5,048
Third	Hamad Adel Al-Obeid	4,815
Third	Faris Saad Al-Otaibi	4,796
Third	Hamad Abdulrrahman Al-Olayan	4,782
Third	Jarrah Khaled Al-Fouzan	3,633
Fourth	Bader Sayyar Al-Shammari	8,487
Fourth	Mubarak Hammoud Al-Tasha	8,376
Fourth	Mutib Ayed Al-Thaydi	7,721
Fourth	Mohammad Awadh Al-Ruqaib	7,196
Fourth	Mohammed Hayef Al-Mutairi	6,966
Fourth	Mubarak Haif Al-Hajraf	6,710
Fourth	Abdullah Fahad Al-Enizi	6,567
Fourth	Saad Ali Al-Rusheedi	6,228
Fourth	Fayez Ghanam Al-Jamhour	6,035
Fourth	Shueib Shabab Al-Muweizri	5,873
Fifth	Saud Abdulaziz Al-Hajri	12,784
Fifth	Hamdan Salem Al-Azmi	10,863
Fifth	Khaled Mohammad Al-Otaibi	8,028
Fifth	Hani Hussein Shams	7,644
Fifth	Marzouq Al-Hubaini Al-Azmi	6,775
Fifth	Fahad Falah Al-Azmi	6,443
Fifth	Abdullhadi Nasser Al-Ajmi	6,341
Fifth	Mohammed Hussain Al-Ajmi	6,324
Fifth	Majed Mussaed Al-Mutairi	6,245
Fifth	Mohammad Hadi Al-Huweila	6,188
Source: KUNA (1, 2, 3, 4, 5)

== Aftermath ==
The first session of the new National Assembly was scheduled for 20 June. Ahmed Al-Sadoun was elected speaker unopposed, while Mohammed Al-Mutair was elected deputy speaker after getting 32 votes compared to Marzouq Al-Hubaini's 14. On 26 July, the Constitutional Court rejected all appeals regarding the electoral process and results of the 2023 election.
