= List of political parties in Kuwait =

Political parties in Kuwait have not been legalized since independence in 1961.

In practice, there are many de facto political parties:

== Current parties ==
| Name | Acronym | Leader | Ideology | Political position | National Assembly seats |
|---|---|---|---|---|---|
| National Democratic Alliance التحالف الديمقراطي الوطني al-Tehalef al-Dimoqrati al-Watani | NDA | Bashar Al-Sayegh | Secularism; National liberalism | Centre-right | 0 / 65 |
| Kuwait Democratic Forum المنبر الديمقراطي الكويتي | KDF | Bandar Al-Khairan | Secularism; Arab nationalism Pan-Arabism | Centre-left | 1 / 65 |
| Kuwaiti Progressive Movement الحركة التقدمية الكويتية | KPM | Ahmad Aldeyain | Socialism; Anti-capitalism; Anti-imperialism; Marxism-Leninism | Left-wing to far-left | 0 / 65 |
| Popular Action Movement حركة العمل الشعبي | PAM | Musallam Al-Barrak | Populism | Centre-right | 0 / 65 |
| Popular Action Bloc كتلة العمل الشعبي | PAB | Ahmed Al-Sadoun | Populism; Nationalism | Centre-left | 2 / 65 |
| Islamic Constitutional Movement الحركة الدستورية الإسلامية al-Haraka al-Dosturiya al-Islamiyah | Hadas حدس | Mohammad al-Olaim | Sunni Islamism | Right-wing | 1 / 65 |
| Islamic Salafi Alliance التجمع الإسلامي السلفي | ISA | Khaled Sultan bin Essa | Islamism; Salafism | Far-right | 3 / 65 |
| National Islamic Alliance التحالف الوطني الإسلامي | NIA | Adnan Zahid Abdulsamad | Shi'a Islamism | | 0 / 65 |
| Justice and Peace Alliance تجمع العدالة والسلام | JPA | Saleh Ashour | Shi'a Islamism | | 1 / 65 |
| Civil Conservative Party حزب المحافظين المدني | CCP | Mohammed Al-Mutayrat | Nationalism; Islamic democracy Paternalistic conservatism | Centre-right | 0 / 65 |
| Civil Democratic Movement | CDM | | | | 0 / 65 |
| Youth Association of Kuwait رابطة الشباب الكويتي | YaKuwait | | Youth politics | Centre-left | 0 / 65 |
| National Islamic Alliance (Taalof) التآلف الوطني الإسلامي | NIA | none | Shi'a Islamism | | 2 / 65 |
| Thawabit Al-Umma تجمع ثوابت الأمة | | Bader Al-Dahoum | Salafism | Far-right | 2 / 65 |

== Outlawed parties ==
| Name | Acronym | Leader | Ideology | Political position |
|---|---|---|---|---|
| Hizb ut-Tahrir حزب التحرير; Hizb at-Tahrir | HT | Ata Abu Rashta | Islamism; Caliphalism | Far-right |

== See also ==
- Politics of Kuwait
- List of ruling political parties by country
