= Islamic Constitutional Movement =

Islamic Constitutional Movement الحركة الدستورية الإسلامية
- Abbreviation: ICM
- Secretary-General: Musaed Al Saidi
- Founded: 31 March 1991
- Headquarters: Kuwait City, Kuwait
- Ideology: Islamism
- Political position: Right-wing
- Religion: Sunni Islam
- International affiliation: Muslim Brotherhood
- National Assembly: 1 / 64

Website
- www.icmkw.org

Islamic Constitutional Movement (الحركة الدستورية الإسلامية Al-Haraka Al-Dosturiya Al-Islamiyah, Hadas) is a Kuwaiti Islamist political organization. It's an offshoot of the Egyptian Muslim Brotherhood.

== History and profile ==
ICM was established on 31 March 1991 following the liberation of Kuwait from the Iraqi invasion in the Gulf War. The group of people who started the Movement and still control it are Kuwaiti Islamists following the ideology of the Muslim Brotherhood, most notably is Jassem Mohalhel.

Bader Al-Nashi was secretary general of the Movement between 2003 and July 2009. Its current secretary general is Musaed Al Saidi. It has one member in the current National Assembly of Kuwait.

== Electoral history ==
=== National Assembly elections ===
Election	Secretary-General	Seats	+/–
1992	Essa al-Shaheen	4 / 50	New
1996	Essa al-Shaheen	6 / 50	▲2
1999	Essa al-Shaheen	4 / 50	▼2
2003	Bader al-Nashi	2 / 50	▼2
2006	Bader al-Nashi	6 / 50	▲4
2008	Bader al-Nashi	4 / 50	▼2
2009	Nasser al-Sane	2 / 50	▼2
2012 (Feb)	Nasser al-Sane	4 / 50	▲2
2012 (Dec)	Nasser al-Sane	0 / 50	▼4
2013	Nasser al-Sane	0 / 50	0
2016	Mohammed al-Olaim	4 / 50	▲4
2020	Musaid al-Saidi	3 / 50	▼1
2022	Musaid al-Saidi	3 / 50	0
2023	Musaid al-Saidi	3 / 50	0
2024	Musaid al-Saidi	1 / 50	▼2

== See also ==
- List of Islamic political parties
