= Thawabit Al-Umma =

Thawabit Al-Umma تجمع ثوابت الأمة
- Leader: Bader Al-Dahoum
- Founded: 2003
- Headquarters: Kuwait City
- Ideology: Salafism
- Political position: Far-right
- Religion: Sunni Islam

Thawabit Al-Umma (Arabic: تجمع ثوابت الأمة, lit. 'Ummah Principles Alliance') is a Salafi political bloc in Kuwait founded in 2003 and headed by Bader Al-Dahoum. Of the fifty elected members of National Assembly, two seats belong to the bloc.

== History ==
The alliance was part of the opposition bloc elected in February 2012. After the annulment of the February 2012 session and the change of the electoral system, the alliance boycotted the following two elections in December 2012 and 2013. On 20 April 2016, they announced their intention to stop boycotting in the next election. On the 2020 election, three members of the alliance, Mohammed Hayef al-Mutairi, Bader Al-Dahoum and Osama Al-Menawer, won seats in the National Assembly. In March 2021, Bader Al-Dahoum’s membership in parliament was annulled by the constitutional court. The alliance’s efforts led to the segregation between the two sexes in Kuwait University on 2023.

== Election results ==
Election	Leader	Seats	+/–
2013	Bader Al-Dahoum	0 / 50	New
2016	Bader Al-Dahoum	1 / 50	▲1
2020	Bader Al-Dahoum	3 / 50	▲2
2022	Bader Al-Dahoum	1 / 50	▼2
2023	Bader Al-Dahoum	1 / 50	0
2024	Bader Al-Dahoum	2 / 50	▲1
