= Saad al-Khanfour al-Rasheedi =

Kuwaiti politician

Saad AlـKhanfour Al-Rasheedi (Arabic: سعد علي خالد خنفور الرشيدي) is a Kuwaiti politician, representing the fourth district in the National Assembly. Born in 1965, Al-Rasheedi worked at the Interior Ministry before being elected to the National Assembly. He was elected to represent the fourth district in 2008, and he was reelected in 2009, February 2012, December 2012, 2013, 2016, 2020, 2022, 2023 and 2024.

== See also ==
- Politics of Kuwait
