= Aseel al-Awadhi =

Kuwaiti politician

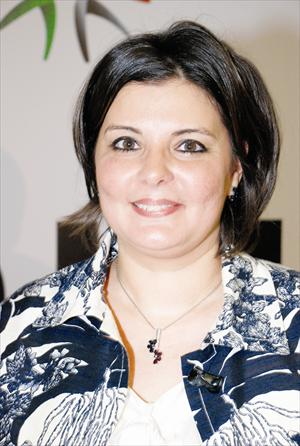
Aseel al-Awadhi

Aseel al-Awadhi (born 1969) is a former member of the National Assembly of Kuwait. She was a professor of philosophy at Kuwait University before entering politics. Al-Awadhi first stood for a seat on the National Assembly in 2008, losing the election but gaining the highest number of votes for a female candidate since women were allowed to stand. She was elected representative of Kuwait's Third District in 2009, a post she held until 2012.

== Education ==
After studying philosophy at Kuwait University, al-Awadhi earned her PhD in philosophy at the University of Texas. Upon returning to Kuwait she became a professor of philosophy at Kuwait University.

== Political career ==
Al-Awadhi first stood in the 2008 general election as part of the National Democratic Alliance. She gained the highest number of votes received by a Kuwaiti woman since women were allowed to stand for the National Assembly in 2005, although she did not gain enough votes to win a seat. In the 2009 election she was elected representative for the third constituency while simultaneously becoming one of the first women to be elected to the National Assembly.

As the first Kuwaiti women in parliament, Rola Dashti and Al-Awadhi did not wear the hijab when they took their seats as MPs in the National Assembly in 2008. This decision was criticized by several Islamist MPs, including Ali al-Omair. In 2009, Kuwait's top court officially ruled that veiling is optional for Kuwaiti women MPs in parliament.

Al-Awadhi lost her seat in the February 2012 election but briefly returned to parliament after the previous parliament was dissolved by the Emir in June 2012. She chose to boycott the December 2012 election in protest of the decision to reduce the number of votes per person from four to one. She chose not to stand in the 2013 election.
