= Shuaib Al-Muwaizri =

Kuwaiti politician (born 1959)

- شعيب المويزري

Member of National Assembly of Kuwait
- Incumbent
- Assumed office November 26, 2016
- Constituency: Fourth District
- In office May 16, 2009 – October 7, 2012
- Constituency: Fourth District

Minister of State for Housing Affairs
- In office February 2, 2012 – June 22, 2012
- Preceded by: Mohammed Al-Noumas
- Succeeded by: Anas Al-Saleh

Minister of National Assembly Affairs
- In office February 2, 2012 – June 22, 2012
- Preceded by: Mohammed Al-Busairi
- Succeeded by: Rola Dashti

Personal details
- Born: December 1, 1959 (age 66)
- Citizenship: Kuwait
- Occupation: Politician

Shuaib Shabab Al-Muwaizri Al-Rashidi (Arabic: شعيب شباب المويزري الرشيدي; born 1 December 1959) is a Kuwaiti politician who has served in the National Assembly since 2016. He served a previous term from 2009 until 2012. Al-Muwaziri is the former Minister of Housing and National Assembly Affairs.

== Career ==
Al-Muwaziri first ran for office in the 1992 election getting seventh place in 18th district. He retired from his work in the Ministry of Interior as a Colonel to pursue his political career. He ran again in the 2009 elections getting 7th place in the fourth district with a total of 12,385 votes. He also won in the February 2012 election. On 2 February 2012, he as appointed as Minister of Housing and National Assembly Affairs but resigned due to annulment of February 2012 results. Al-Muwaziri ran again on 2016 election winning with 3,528 votes. Leading him to run for the speaker of National Assembly. He lost after getting only eight votes out of 65. Al-Muwaziri got first place on 2020, 2022 and 2024 elections. He slipped to tenth place on the 2023 election.

=== Election results ===
Year	Votes polled
1992	221 (L)
2009	12,385 (W)
2012 (Feb)	10,781 (W)
2016	3,528 (W)
2020	6,200 (W)
2022	8,995 (W)
2023	5,873 (W)
2024	15,663 (W)
