= Storming of the Kuwait National Assembly =

- Native name: اقتحام مجلس الأمة الكويتي
- Date: November 16, 2011
- Location: Kuwait City, Kuwait
- Also known as: Black Wednesday (الأربعاء الأسود)
- Type: Political protest, storming of government building
- Cause: Allegations of corruption, including the "million dinar deposits" scandal; demands for resignation of Prime Minister Nasser Mohammed Al-Ahmad Al-Sabah
- Participants: Hundreds of opposition protesters, including current and former MPs: Musallam Al-Barrak, Jamaan Al-Harbash, Walid Al-Tabtabaie, Faisal Al-Muslim, Falah Al-Sawagh, Fahd Al-Khanna, Khalid Al-Tahous, Mubarak Al-Waalan, Mohammed Hayef Al-Mutairi and others; opposed by Kuwaiti security forces under Emir Sabah Al-Ahmad Al-Jaber Al-Sabah and Prime Minister Nasser Mohammed Al-Ahmad Al-Sabah
- Outcome: Resignation of Prime Minister Nasser Mohammed Al-Ahmad Al-Sabah on November 28, 2011; Dissolution of the National Assembly of Kuwait (2009) on December 6, 2011; Snap elections held on February 2, 2012, resulting in opposition victory; Legal proceedings against ~70 participants, with convictions, appeals, and full amnesty on November 8, 2021
- Injuries: Several protesters and security forces injured
- Arrests: ~70 (leading to multi-year trials)
- Emir described it as a "black day"; opposition called it the "white Wednesday" as a stand against corruption

The Storming of the Kuwait National Assembly (Arabic: اقتحام مجلس الأمة الكويتي), also known as Black Wednesday (الأربعاء الأسود), was a political protest that culminated in the forced entry into the National Assembly of Kuwait building in Kuwait City on November 16, 2011. It formed part of the wider 2011–2012 Kuwaiti protests, influenced by the Arab Spring, but centered on domestic grievances such as corruption and governance failures. Protesters, including opposition members of parliament (MPs), demanded the resignation of Prime Minister Nasser Mohammed Al-Ahmad Al-Sabah due to allegations of high-level corruption, notably the "million dinar deposits" scandal involving alleged bribes to MPs. The event represented a dramatic escalation in Kuwaiti political activism, leading to significant changes including the prime minister's resignation and the dissolution of parliament.

== Background ==
Kuwait operates as a constitutional monarchy with one of the most active parliaments in the Gulf region. Political tensions had been mounting since the late 2000s, exacerbated during the term of the National Assembly of Kuwait elected in 2009. This period saw repeated interpellations (formal questionings) of government ministers, particularly Prime Minister Nasser Mohammed Al-Ahmad Al-Sabah, who faced persistent accusations of corruption and mismanagement.

The primary catalyst was the "million dinar deposits" scandal, in which it was alleged that sums up to 1 million Kuwaiti dinars were deposited into the accounts of pro-government MPs to sway votes. This sparked widespread outrage, fueling protests organized by youth groups, opposition MPs, and activists. Demonstrations intensified from early 2011, drawing inspiration from the Arab Spring but prioritizing local reforms over regime overthrow.

Prominent opposition figures, including Musallam Al-Barrak, Jamaan Al-Harbash, and Walid Al-Tabtabaie, were instrumental in rallying support, advocating for the prime minister's removal and parliamentary dissolution.

== Events ==
On November 16, 2011, hundreds of protesters assembled outside the National Assembly building after a rally. Tensions escalated as security forces used batons and tear gas to disperse the crowd. In response, a group led by opposition MPs breached the gates and entered the main chamber, Abdullah Al-Salem Hall.

Inside, the protesters chanted anti-corruption slogans and calls for the prime minister's resignation. The occupation lasted approximately 30 minutes before security forces regained control and evicted them. Injuries were reported among both protesters and security personnel during the clashes.

Emir Sabah Al-Ahmad Al-Jaber Al-Sabah condemned the incident on November 20, 2011, labeling it a "black day" in Kuwait's history, deeming it unconstitutional, and vowing no amnesty for participants while ordering enhanced security. In contrast, the opposition referred to it as the "white Wednesday," symbolizing resistance to corruption.

== Aftermath ==
The storming jolted Kuwaiti society and amplified political pressure. Prime Minister Nasser Mohammed Al-Ahmad Al-Sabah resigned on November 28, 2011. The Emir dissolved parliament on December 6, 2011, and scheduled new elections for February 2, 2012, which yielded an opposition-majority assembly.

The incident underscored ongoing executive-legislative frictions and spurred discussions on political reform and anti-corruption measures.

== Legal proceedings ==
Around 70 individuals, including nine current and former MPs, faced charges such as unlawful entry, assault on public officials, and property damage. The trials extended over years with varying results:

- In December 2013, a lower court acquitted all 70 defendants.
- On appeal in December 2017, the Court of Appeals convicted 67, issuing sentences ranging from 1 to 9 years, including 9 years for 13 defendants (7 MPs) and 5 years for 21 others.
- In July 2018, the Court of Cassation upheld reduced sentences of 3 years and 6 months for eight MPs and others.
- The Constitutional Court unseated two MPs (Jamaan Al-Harbash and Walid Al-Tabtabaie) in December 2018 due to their convictions.
- In February 2018, dozens were granted bail pending further appeals.

Human Rights Watch condemned the convictions as infringements on free speech and assembly.

On November 8, 2021, Emir Nawaf Al-Ahmad Al-Jaber Al-Sabah granted a general amnesty, pardoning all convicted parties and restoring their rights.

== See also ==
- 2011–2012 Kuwaiti protests
- National Assembly of Kuwait
- Politics of Kuwait
- Arab Spring
