= December 2012 Kuwaiti general election =

← February 2012	1 December 2012	2013 →
- 50 of the 65 seats in the National Assembly
- Turnout: 39.6% (▼19.9pp)

Early general elections were held in Kuwait on 1 December 2012 after early elections in February 2012 were declared invalid.

In the elections, Shi'as won 17 out of 50 seats in the National Assembly, an increase from the seven won in the February elections. Sunni Islamists were reduced to a minority. Three women also entered the Parliament compared to men-only from the February election, but their number decreased compared to the 2009 election.

Turnout was officially reported to be 43%, the lowest in the Kuwaiti electoral history.

== Background ==
Six weeks before the elections, the electoral system was changed to single non-transferable vote, with voters restricted to voting for only one candidate, having previously been allowed to vote for four under multiple non-transferable vote. The changes resulted in mass protests and an opposition boycott of the elections. Shafeeq Ghabra, professor at the Faculty of Political Sciences at Kuwait University said that, "it's clear that the boycott was very successful." The opposition rejected a unilateral amendment of the electoral law that reduced the number of votes per person from four to one.

== Results ==
District	Candidate	Votes	%	Notes
First	Kamel Mahmoud al-Awadhi	5,747	13.4	Elected
First	Adnan Zahid Abdulsamad	4,986	11.6	Elected
First	Faisal Saud Saleh Duwaisan	4,851	11.3	Elected
First	Yusuf Sayed Zalzalah	3,500	8.2	Elected
First	Massouma al-Mubarak	3,197	7.5	Elected
First	Hamid Abbas Hussein Dashti	2,723	6.4	Elected
First	Saleh Ashour	2,260	5.3	Elected
First	Nawaf Suleiman al-Fezia	2,143	5.0	Elected
First	Khalid Hussain al-Shatti	1,902	4.4	Elected
First	Hussain Al-Qallaf Al-Bahrani	1,696	4.0	Elected
First	41 other candidates	9,830	22.9	
Second	Ali Al-Rashid	3,041	11.6	Elected
Second	Adnan Ibrahim al-Mutawa	2,608	9.9	Elected
Second	Abdul Rahman al-Jiran	2,335	8.9	Elected
Second	Badr Rashid Bathali	1,919	7.3	Elected
Second	Adel Jarallah al-Kharafi	1,838	7.0	Elected
Second	Ahmed Lari	1,639	6.2	Elected
Second	Khalaf Al-Enezi	1,553	5.9	Elected
Second	Khalil Ibrahim Saleh	1,485	5.7	Elected
Second	Hamad Saif al-Hrchana	1,043	4.0	Elected
Second	Salah Abdullatif al-Ateeqi	910	3.5	Elected
Second	40 other candidates	7,857	30.0	
Third	Ali al-Omair	5,850	15.2	Elected
Third	Khalil Abdullah Ali Abdullah	3,887	10.1	Elected
Third	Ahmed Al-Mulaifi	2,984	7.7	Elected
Third	Safa Abdulrahman al-Hashem	2,622	6.8	Elected
Third	Saadoun Hammad Otaibi	2,159	5.6	Elected
Third	Hisham Hussein al-Baghli	2,016	5.2	Elected
Third	Abdullah Yusuf Rajab Mayouf	1,952	5.1	Elected
Third	Nabil Nuri al-Fadl	1,883	4.9	Elected
Third	Yacoub Mohsen al-Sahneh	1,381	3.6	Elected
Third	Mohammed Nasser al-Jabri	1,250	3.2	Elected
Third	50 other candidates	12,570	32.6	
Fourth	Askar Al-Enezi	2,479	8.0	Elected
Fourth	Saad al-Khanfour al-Rasheedi	2,469	8.0	Elected
Fourth	Saud Al-Harija	2,084	6.7	Elected
Fourth	Mubarak al-Khurainej	1,772	5.7	Elected
Fourth	Thekra Ayed al-Rashidi	1,282	4.1	Elected
Fourth	Khaled Rifai Mohammed Al-Shuleyma	1,236	4.0	Elected
Fourth	Mohammed Al-Rasheedi	1,213	3.9	Elected
Fourth	Mubarak Hamdan al-Orf	1,105	3.6	Elected
Fourth	Mishari Zahir al-Husseini	1,101	3.6	Elected
Fourth	Mubarak Saleh al-Nejadhu	1,085	3.5	Elected
Fourth	56 other candidates	15,107	48.8	
Fifth	Faisal Mohammed al-Kandari	3,570	14.3	Elected
Fifth	Abdullah Ibrahim al-Tamimi	2,932	11.7	Elected
Fifth	Nasser Abdel al-Marri	1,667	6.7	Elected
Fifth	Hani Hussein Shams	1,666	6.7	Elected
Fifth	Essam Al-Dabbous	1,319	5.3	Elected
Fifth	Tahir Ali al-Failakawi	887	3.5	Elected
Fifth	Hammad Hammad al-Dossari	882	3.5	Elected
Fifth	Khaled Salem al-Ajmi	851	3.4	Elected
Fifth	Saad Fahad al-Bous	791	3.2	Elected
Fifth	Nasser Abdullah al-Shammari	519	2.1	Elected
Fifth	70 other candidates	9,932	39.7	
Invalid/blank votes		3,639	–	–
Total		167,205	100	
Registered voters/turnout		422,569	39.6	
Source: Adam Carr

== Aftermath ==
On 5 December, despite calls for political reforms, Jaber Al-Mubarak Al-Hamad Al-Sabah was reappointed Prime Minister. In the opening session of the Assembly, Ali al-Rashid was elected Speaker.

Candidate	Party	Votes	%
Ali Al-Rashid	Independent	33	52.38
Ali al-Omair	Independent	26	41.27
Ahmed Al-Mulaifi	Independent	4	6.35
Total		63	100.00
Valid votes		63	100.00
Invalid/blank votes		0	0.00
Total votes		63	100.00
Registered voters/turnout		65	96.92

In June 2013, the Constitutional Court ordered the dissolution of the National Assembly and the holding of fresh elections.
