= Mubarak Al-Mutairi =

Kuwaiti politician (born 1959)

Mubarak Al-Mutairi is a former member of the Kuwaiti National Assembly. Born in 1959, Al-Mutairi studied political science at Kuwait University and worked as a diplomat before being elected to the National Assembly to represent the fourth district in 2008. However, on September 22, 2008, following a vote recount, the constitutional court repealed Al-Mutairi's seat and gave it to Askar Al-Enezi. While political parties are technically illegal in Kuwait, Al-Mutairi affiliated with the Popular Action Bloc. He is a member of the Al-Mutairi tribe.
