= Mubarak Al-Hajraf =

Kuwaiti lawyer and politician

- مبارك الحجرف

Member of National Assembly of Kuwait
- Incumbent
- Assumed office November 26, 2016
- Constituency: Fourth District

Personal details
- Born: March 1, 1970 (age 55)
- Citizenship: Kuwait
- Occupation: Lawyer — Politician

Mubarak Haif Saad Al-Hajraf (Arabic: مبارك هيف سعد الحجرف; born 1 March 1970) is a Kuwaiti lawyer and politician serving in the National Assembly since 2016.

== Early career ==
Mubarak Al-Hajraf was born on 1 March 1970 in Kuwait. His father, Haif Al-Hajraf, was a former member of the Municipal Council in the 1970s. He got his law degree from Kuwait University. Also, he got his law doctorate from Panthéon-Sorbonne University. He worked as a lawyer before entering politics.

== Political career ==
Mubarak Al-Hajraf ran for the first time in the February 2012 election. He lost in that election getting only 5408 votes in the Fourth District. He won his first election in 2016, getting second place with over 4600 votes. Al-Hajraf won in the 2020 election getting 4422 votes. On 22 June 2021, he sat in government ministers seat in parliament in order for the prime minister Sabah Al-Khalid to stand for questioning. This in-cooperation led to dissolution of 2020 session leading Mubarak to run again in the 2022 election. He won getting fourth place with 6342 votes. On January 10, he requested to grill the Minister of Finance Abdulwahab Al-Rushaid on seven subjects including rejecting the merger between Kuwait Finance House & Ahli United Bank. He won again in the 2023 election getting 6710 votes. He won the 2024 election, getting 6,925 votes in ninth place.

=== Election results ===
Year	Votes polled
2012 (Feb)	5,408 (L)
2016	4,621 (W)
2020	4,422 (W)
2022	6,342 (W)
2023	6,710 (W)
2024	6,925 (W)
