= Elections in Kuwait =

Elections in Kuwait are held for the National Assembly. Kuwait's constitution calls for elections to the unicameral National Assembly at a maximum interval of four years. Elections are held earlier if the Constitutional Court or Emir dissolve the parliament.

== Electoral districts ==
Kuwait was divided into five electoral districts for the National Assembly elections between 1963 and 1975. Each district elected ten deputies to the Assembly. Before the 1981 elections the government redistricted Kuwait, creating a system of 25 districts. Following the redistricting, fewer Shi'ite candidates won seats in the Assembly. This was a deliberate result of the redistricting, and it followed the 1979 Revolution in Iran. Each of the 25 districts elected two members to the National Assembly, for a total of 50 elected members (additional members sit as appointed members of the cabinet). The old system was reinstated sometime before December 2012.

== Political blocs ==
While informal groups and voting blocs existed, most candidates ran as independents. Once elected, some deputies formed voting blocs in the National Assembly. While Kuwaiti law does not recognize political parties, political groups functioned as de facto political parties in elections, so there were blocs in the parliament. Major de facto political parties included: National Democratic Alliance, Popular Action Bloc, Hadas (Kuwaiti Muslim Brotherhood), National Islamic Alliance and Justice and Peace Alliance.

== Election history ==
The earliest modern elections in Kuwait were held in 1921. Elections were held again in June and then in December 1938 for a majlis al-tashri'i, or Legislative Council. The ruling family dissolved the second Council in 1939. Following independence in 1961 elections were held in 1962 to elect 20 members to the constitutional convention.

In the elections on May 23, 2024, the polling stations in Kuwait saw a notable turnout of citizens.

== Suffrage ==
Kuwait has universal adult suffrage for Kuwaiti citizens who are 21 or older. The constitution bars members of the ruling family from running for election to the National Assembly, though the constitution does not explicitly prohibit these members of the ruling family from casting votes. When voting was first introduced in Kuwait in 1985, Kuwaiti women had the right to vote. This right was later removed. In 2005, Kuwaiti women were re-granted the right to vote.

Kuwait's citizenship law, in theory, gives citizenship to those who descend, in the male line, from residents of Kuwait in 1920.

== See also ==
- Politics of Kuwait
