= Kuwaiti protests (2011–2012) =

Civil unrest

- Part of the Arab Spring
- Date: 19 February 2011 – December 2012
- Location: Kuwait
- Caused by: Statelessness; Corruption
- Methods: Demonstrations; Online activism
- Result: Prime Minister Nasser Al-Sabah resigns; Dissolution of the Parliament

Parties
Kuwaiti opposition groups: The Opposition Coalition; Popular Action Bloc; Liberals; Islamists; Socialists; Feminists	Government of Kuwait: Kuwait Police

Lead figures
Former members of the National Assembly	Nasser Mohammed al-Ahmed al-Sabah; Prime Minister of Kuwait

The Kuwaiti protests refers to the series of 2011–2012 demonstrations for government reforms in the state of Kuwait. In November 2011, the government of Kuwait resigned in response to the protests, making Kuwait one of several countries affected by the Arab Spring to experience major governmental changes due to unrest. The protests began with stateless people (Bedoon).

== History and timeline ==
=== Stateless protests (early 2011) ===
Sabah Al-Sabah, the Emir of Kuwait, gave every Kuwaiti citizen 1,000 dinars (3580 $) and a free food grant for one year on 18 January 2011, officially to commemorate the 20th anniversary of Kuwait's liberation from occupying Iraqi forces during the First Gulf War, as well as the 50th anniversary of the state's independence. But the grant was not extended to the stateless Bedoon living in Kuwait. Dozens demonstrated in Kuwait City on 19 February against their supposed second-class status. Opposition leaders called for further protests in March to pressure Prime Minister Nasser Al-Sabah to resign.

Stateless people continued to protest into January 2012 despite a protest ban, turning out on 13 and 14 January in slums near Kuwait City to call for the right to citizenship. On both days, violence broke out, with riot police clashing with stateless demonstrators and arresting several dozen on 13 January and firing tear gas to disperse rally-goers on 14 January.

Riot police on 2 October used tear gas and smoke bombs to disperse hundreds of stateless demonstrators who were demanding citizenship. Witnesses and activists said at least three people, including a policeman, were slightly wounded and 10 stateless were arrested as security forces laid a siege on the Taima suburb in Al Jahra which houses tens of thousands of stateless. The new protest comes a week after three international human rights groups sent an unprecedented letter to Emir Al-Sabah urging him to end alleged abuse against stateless people.

=== Political protests (mid 2011–2012) ===
On the night of 16 November, demonstrators and several opposition MPs stormed the National Assembly, briefly occupying it while singing and shouting slogans calling for Prime Minister Nasser Al-Sabah to step down. They left after several minutes to rally in the adjacent Al-Erada Square, although riot police attacked several protesters with nightsticks when a smaller group split off and tried to charge the prime minister's residence.

Shortly after the Constitutional Court declared in June 2012 that the February 2012 National Assembly election were "illegal" and reinstated the previous pro-government parliament, thousands of Kuwaitis rally in Al-Erada Square on 26 June to protests against a court ruling that dissolved the opposition-dominated parliament. Demonstrators chanted "we will not surrender", while a prominent opposition MP called for a constitutional monarchy. On 27 August, around 3,000 people, mainly men in traditional Kuwaiti dress, gathered opposite parliament at Al-Erada Square to protest changes to the electoral law which they said could harm the prospects of opposition lawmakers in upcoming elections.

Around 1,500 Kuwaitis took part in a rally late on 10 September to protest against possible changes in the electoral law and call for more democracy. The crowd, which included opposition lawmakers and political activists, gathered outside parliament in a square which has hosted several anti-government demonstrations since late last year. However, the turnout was smaller than previous rallies in the major oil producer and there was only a light police presence.

Thousands of Kuwait opposition supporters rallied on 24 September, a day ahead where the Constitutional Court is scheduled to rule on next day if the electoral constituency law is in line with the constitution based on a request submitted by the government last month. Around 10,000 people, who filled the seaside square opposite the parliament building, cheered loudly as opposition figures called for an elected government and warned against what they called a politicised ruling. The next day, the Constitutional Court ruled that the Gulf emirate's electoral constituency law was in line with the constitution, rejecting a government appeal. Dozens of opposition activists who were in the court room hailed the verdict and exchanged congratulations.

On 15 October, Kuwaiti security forces detained at least five people, including the son of a prominent opposition figure, at an anti-government protest against possible changes to an election law. Several people were hurt in skirmishes at the rally, attended by at least 3,000 people who defied a request by authorities to cancel the Monday night demonstration. In some of the strongest remarks by an opposition figure, former lawmaker Musallam Al-Barrak appealed directly to Kuwaiti Emir to avoid "autocratic rule". His speech to the crowd contained extremely rare criticism of the ruler, "In the name of the nation, in the name of the people, we will not let you, your Highness, practice autocratic rule," Barrak told the rally in a speech addressed to the emir, drew repeated chants of "we will not let you, we will not let you" from the crowd. Analysts said his remarks, including the criticism of the emir could spark a strong reaction from the authorities. The son of Ahmed Al-Sadoun, another prominent opposition leader and former parliament speaker, was among those detained during the protest near parliament where several anti-government demonstrations have taken place in the past year.

After the 1 December elections which were won by pro-government candidates due to boycotts by the opposition, hundreds of opposition supporters demonstrated in various areas of Kuwait late on 6 December to demand scrapping the newly elected national assembly. Night demonstrations were staged in at least four areas of the state and that riot police used teargas and stun grenades to disperse the protesters. Activists clashed with police on the next day as they took to the streets in at least eight areas of the Gulf state. Thousands then demonstrated on 8 December to demand dissolving the new elected parliament.

==== Nasser Abul ====
Nasser Abul is a Kuwaiti online activist. On 7 July 2011, he was imprisoned by the government of Kuwait on state security charges, following a series of tweets in support of Arab Spring protesters in Bahrain. Sheikh Abdullah Mohammed bin Ahmed Al Fateh Al Khalifa of Bahrain's ruling Al Khalifa family thanked the Kuwaiti government for Abul's arrest and also announced his intention to file a private libel suit against Abul.

Following his arrest, Abul stated that the most inflammatory tweets on his account had been posted by hackers, and that when he became aware of the tweets, he had deleted them with his iPhone. Abul has alleged that he was beaten and subjected to sleep deprivation in the first two days of his detention; according to his lawyer, Abul was also denied counsel for several hearings. One week after his arrest, Amnesty International named him a prisoner of conscience and called for his immediate release. Human Rights Watch also demanded that the charges against him be dropped, with a representative stating that "Kuwait has sunk to a new low by arresting people just for posting criticism of governments on the internet." On 19 September, Kuwaiti MP Faisal Al-Duwaisan, Chairman of the Human Rights Committee, requested Abul's release, calling it "a shame to taint Kuwait’s human rights history".

On 27 September 2011, Abul was released from Kuwait Central Prison.

== Response ==
=== Domestic ===
On 18 October 2012, former MP Bader al-Dahum was taken into police custody. Khaled al-Tahus, also a former MP, was summoned for questioning by the prosecution service. Later, a group of around 500 people gathered outside the Justice Palace late Thursday night to protest against the detention of the former lawmakers. On the same day, Kuwait's Al-Sabah royal family issued a rare statement calling for "obedience" to the government. The three former lawmakers were all later released on bail on 23 October. Local media reported on 24 October that authorities have banned gatherings of more than 20 people.

Opposition lawmaker Musallam Al-Barrak was arrested by Kuwaiti authorities on the night of 29 October following a news conference at his house where he called on the government to abide by the constitution. Activists says that his arrest could impact for the further protests, which demonstrators have vowed to stage another protest on 4 November. He was freed after an appeal although he remains under investigation. Another opposition figure, former Islamist MP Faisal Al-Muslim, has been summoned for questioning on 31 October. On 3 November, the Kuwaiti newspaper Al-Anbaa quoted a security source saying that authorities may call in the army to help security forces stop a march called by the opposition for the next day, shortly after the government vowed to use force if necessary. There were allegations that Jordanian forces had been deployed to assist in quelling protests in Kuwait. However, the Jordanian government denies this, saying the reports were "fabricated" and "not worthy of comment."
