= National Islamic Alliance (Taalof) =

Political organization in Kuwait

National Islamic Alliance التآلف الوطني الإسلامي
- Leader: vacant
- Founded: 26 June 2022
- Headquarters: Kuwait City
- Ideology: Islamism
- Religion: Shi'a Islam
- National Assembly: 2 / 65

The National Islamic Alliance (Arabic: التآلف الوطني الإسلامي) is a Shia political organization in Kuwait. The bloc was founded on 26 June 2022 after it broke off from the similarly named Shia bloc the National Islamic Alliance (Tahalof).

Before the 2022 election, a series of disagreements between members of Tahalof lead to the breakup of the alliance into two. Major members of the NIA, notably Ahmed Lari, formed the National Islamic Alliance (Taalof) on 22 June. In the 2022 election, both of its candidates, Lari of the first constituency and Hani Shams of the fifth, won seats in parliament.

== Election results ==
Election	Leader	Seats	+/–
2022	Saleh Al-Mousa	2 / 50	New
2023	Saleh Al-Mousa	2 / 50	0
2024	Saleh Al-Mousa	2 / 50	0
