= Saud Al-Asfoor =

Politician in Kuwait

- سعود بوعبدالعزيز العصفور

Member of National Assembly of Kuwait
- Incumbent
- Assumed office June 6, 2023
- Constituency: Fifth District
- In office September 29, 2022 – March 19, 2023
- Constituency: Fifth District

Personal details
- Born: 1972 (age 52–53)
- Citizenship: Kuwait
- Occupation: Engineer; Journalist

Saud Abdulaziz Saud Al-Asfoor Al-Hajri (Arabic: سعود عبدالعزيز سعود العصفور الهاجري; born 1972) is a journalist and engineer that has served in the National Assembly since 2023. He also served in the annulled 2022 Assembly. He is also the owner of Sabr e-Newspaper.

== Early career ==
Saud Al-Asfoor was born on 1972 in Kuwait City. He studied his bachelor's and master's degree on mechanical engineering in the United States. He worked in Ministry of Public Works as an engineer. During 2006, Al-Asfoor opened the National Kuwaiti Network website, which allowed people to write their opinions anonymously and without requiring IP information. On 2 May 2011, Saud opened a e-newspaper called Sabr. In 2011, Saud worked on Talk Show with Al-Waishi that aired on Al-Yawm until 2014.

== Political career ==
Al-Asfoor worked as a political journalist and writer on multiple newspapers like Alam Al Yawm and Al-Rai. On 30 May 2016, he was sentenced to one year in prison for his involvement in the dissident “Fintas Group”. On 14 March 2018, Saud Al-Asfoor completed his one-year sentence.

=== Parliamentary career ===
On 14 April 2021, Saud Al-Asfoor registered for the 2021 by-election. But on April 24, he withdrew from the by-election after pressure from opposition members in order to support Obaid Al-Wasmi. He decided to run for office again in the 2022 election. He won the election getting second place in the Fifth District with 10,252. After the annulment of 2022 results, Saud ran again in the 2023 election. He got first place in the Fifth District with 12,784 votes. He won the 2024 election, getting 10,643 votes in fourth place.

=== Election results ===
Year	Votes polled
2022	10,252 (W)
2023	12,784 (W)
2024	10,643 (W)
