= Popular Action Movement =

Popular Action Movement حركة العمل الشعبي
- Leader: Musallam Al-Barrak
- Founded: March 2013
- Ideology: Populism

Election symbol

Website
- http://7ashdkw.com/

The Popular Action Movement (Arabic: حركة العمل الشعبي, PAM) is a Kuwaiti opposition political group.

Formed in the aftermath of the 2011–12 protests, the PAM first came together in March 2013 by opposition youth groups and former MPs. Their aims included the creation of an elected government, a return to the previous voting system, and the legalisation of political parties. The group was created by members of the Popular Action Bloc, including Ahmed Al-Sadoun and Musallam Al-Barrak, who became the group's general secretary.

In June 2015, general secretary Al-Barrak began serving a two-year prison sentence following criticism of Emir Sabah Al-Ahmad Al-Jaber Al-Sabah in a speech three years prior. He remained leader throughout his jail time.
