= Muhannad Al-Sayer =

Kuwaiti politician & Lawyer

- مهند الساير

Member of National Assembly of Kuwait
- Incumbent
- Assumed office December 16, 2020
- Constituency: Third District

Personal details
- Born: January 7, 1981 (age 44)
- Citizenship: Kuwait
- Occupation: Lawyer - Politician

Muhannad Talal Al-Sayer (Arabic: مهند طلال الساير; born 7 January 1981) is a Kuwaiti lawyer currently serving as member of National Assembly since 2020. He was notably the main lawyer representing Mohammed Al-Maimoni who was murdered by two prison guards at the Kuwait Central Prison.

== Career ==
=== Law career ===
Muhannad Al-Sayer got his bachelor of Law in 2004. In 2011, he was appointed by Kuwaiti Society of Lawyers as the defending lawyer of the late Mohammed Al-Maimoni. Which led the two policemen that murdered Al-Maimoni, in custody, to receive the death penalty. In 2017, Al-Sayer was elected as vice-president of the Kuwaiti Society of Lawyers.

=== Political career ===
Muhannad Al-Sayer first ran in the 2016 election. He only received 1,534 votes failing to get a seat in parliament. Al-Sayer ran again in 2020, getting third place with 3,565 and getting a seat in parliament. On 29 March 2021, Al-Sayer, Jawhar & Al-Mudhaf requested to grill prime minister Sabah Al-Khalid.

On 9 March 2022, Al-Sayer, Jawhar & Al-Otaibi requested to grill the prime minister Sabah Al-Khalid again. This was due to the government being un-cooperative with MPs, unconstitutional acts by Al-Khalid, and alleged embezzlement by government ministers. The questioning led into a no-confidence vote which the majority of elected members, 26, agreed to. Leading to the resignation of the government in April 5.

Al-Sayer ran in the 2022 election. He got fourth place in the third district with almost 6000 votes. After the annulment of 2022 results, he ran for the fourth time in 2023. He got elected with 5772 votes. He won the 2024 election, getting 5,114 votes in seventh place.

=== Election results ===
Year	Votes polled
2016	1,534 (L)
2020	3,565 (W)
2022	5,998 (W)
2023	5,772 (W)
2024	5,114 (W)
