= 2012 Kuwaiti general election =

The 2012 Kuwaiti general election may refer to:

- February 2012 Kuwaiti general election, a general election held on 2 February
- December 2012 Kuwaiti general election, a general election held on 1 December
