= Kuwaiti parliamentary election, 2012 =

Kuwaiti parliamentary election, 2012 may refer to:

- Kuwaiti parliamentary election, February 2012
- Kuwaiti parliamentary election, December 2012
