= Abdullah Al-Barghash =

Kuwaiti politician

Abdullah Al-Barghash was a former member of the Kuwaiti National Assembly from the fifth district. Born in 1962, Al-Barghash studied Customs Affairs and worked in the Customs Department before being elected to the National Assembly in 2008. While political parties are technically illegal in Kuwait, Al-Barghash affiliates with the Islamist and Salafi deputies. He is a member of the Ajman tribe.
