= Hamad Al-Midlij =

Kuwaiti politician (born 1984)

- حمد المدلج

Member of National Assembly of Kuwait
- Incumbent
- Assumed office June 20, 2023
- Constituency: First District
- In office October 18, 2022 – March 19, 2023
- Constituency: First District

Personal details
- Born: 1984 (age 40–41)
- Citizenship: Kuwait
- Occupation: Politician

Hamad Mohammed Al-Midlij (Arabic: حمد محمد المدلج, born 1984) is a Kuwaiti politician who is currently serving as a member of National Assembly since 2023. He also served in the annulled 2022 session. Hamad also served as an elected member of the 2018 Municipal council.

== Career ==
Hamad worked in the Ministry of Interior before getting into politics. He also was a board member of Mishrif Co-op. Hamad Al-Midlij ran in the 2018 Kuwaiti Municipal Council election as his first election, he won the first chair in the fourth constituency with 4,108 votes. Al-Midlij served as the chair of Financial and Legal Committee of the council.

After finishing his term in the Municipal Council, he ran for office in the National Assembly in 2022. He got ninth place in the first district getting 2826 votes. After the annulment of 2022 results, he ran again in the 2023 election. He got the seat again with 2888 votes.

=== Election results ===
Year	Votes polled
2022	2,826 (W)
2023	2,888 (W)
