= Rakan Al-Nisf =

Kuwaiti politician (born 1980)

- راكان النصف
- Born: 1980 (age 45–46)
- Citizenship: Kuwait
- Education: BA in Finance
- Alma mater: Kuwait University.
- Occupation: Politician.
- Organization: Society for the Protection of Public Money.
- Known for: Member of Parliament of the Kuwait Parliament.
- Website: http://rakanalnusif.com

Rakan Yousif Humoud Al-Nisf (Arabic: راكان النصف) (born 1980) is a politician, who is an elected Member of Parliament of the Kuwait Parliament. Al-Nisf was first elected in the Kuwaiti General Election 2013, he won the third chair in the second constituency by 2,527 votes. Al-Nisf was also elected in the Kuwaiti General Election 2016 and he won the eighth chair in the second constituency by 1,888 votes.

Al-Nisf contributed in the following parliamentary committees:

- Committee of the Draft Answer to the Emiri Speech
- Financial and Economic Affairs Committee
- Public Facilities Committee
