= Mohammed Al-Sanousi =

Kuwaiti politician (1937/1938 – 2022)

Mohammed Nasser Al-Sanousi
- محمد ناصر السنعوسي
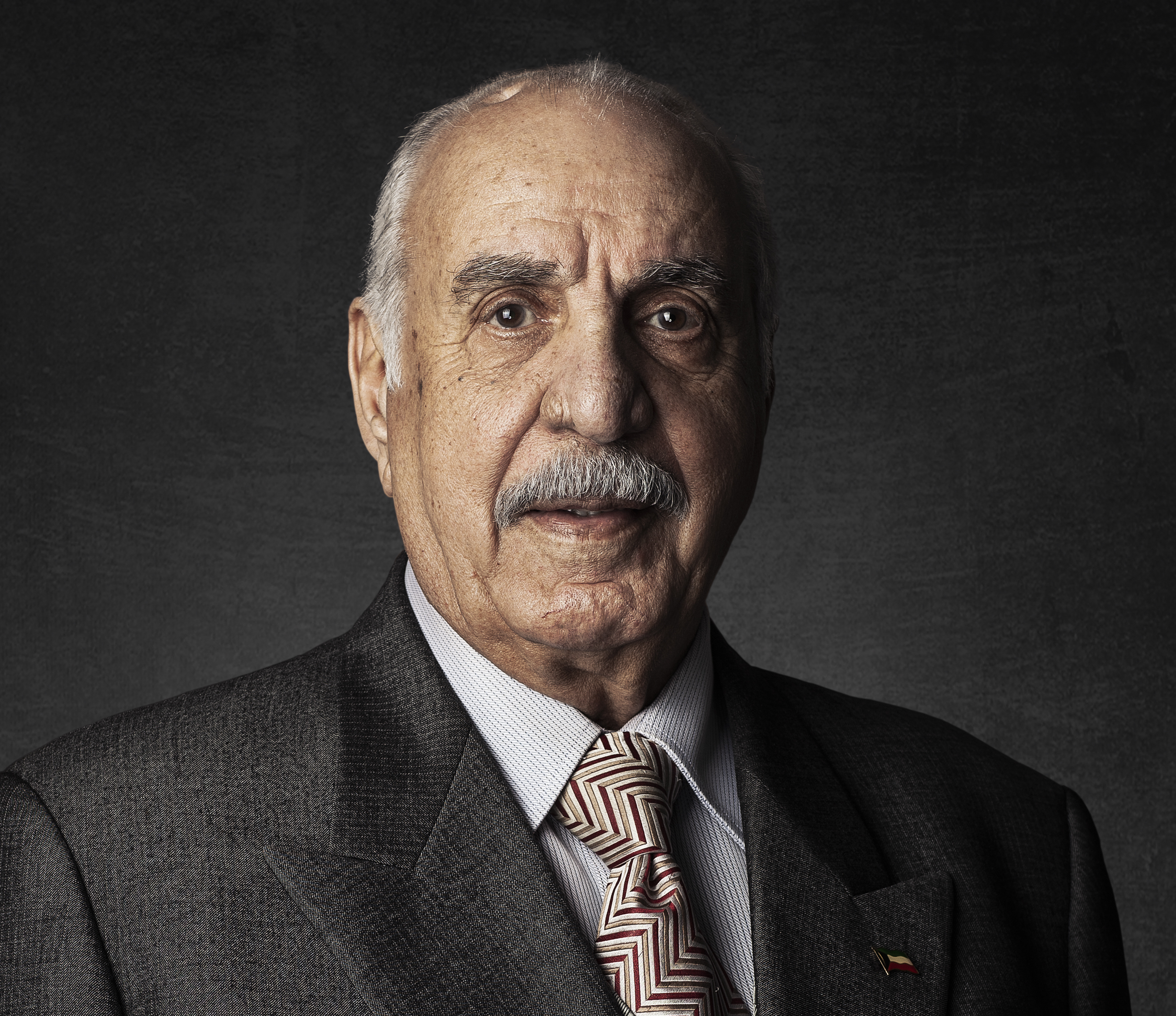
- Born: 1937 or 1938; Kuwait
- Died: 15 November 2022 (aged 84)

Mohammed Sanousi or Mohammed Nasser Al-Sanousi (Arabic: محمد ناصر السنعوسي, 1937/1938 – 15 November 2022) was a Kuwaiti director, producer, media personality and politician who served for eight months as Kuwait's Minister of Information, taking the post in April 2006 and resigning on 17 December. In April 2012, Al-Sanousi was given the "Arab award for media creativity" of the 9th Arab Media Forum, hosted in Kuwait.

Al-Sanousi assumed the post following the resignation of Anas Al-Reshaid. Al-Sanousi became a controversial figure during the 2006 parliamentary election, during which he ordered several satellite television channels supporting opposition parties to be taken off the air. MP Mohammed Al-Sager pledged that the opposition bloc would not allow Al-Sanousi to be reappointed due to restrictions he had allegedly placed on press freedoms. Islamist MP Faisal Al-Muslim stated that Al-Sanousi's actions had been "against the principles of freedom, and against the constitution that guarantees freedom of speech, expression and publication". Al-Sanousi resigned on 17 December 2006, one day before he was due to be grilled by parliament. Opposition MP Musallam Al-Barrak suggested Al-Sanousi had been forced to quit, calling it "a victory for the constitution, democracy and freedom".
