= Askar Al-Enezi =

Kuwaiti politician

Askar Al-Enezi (born 1971) is a former Kuwaiti politician, representing the fourth district. He was elected to the National Assembly in 2008. The tenth representative from the fifth district was originally Mubarak Al-Mutairi. However, on September 22, 2008, following a vote recount, the constitutional court repealed Al-Mutairi's seat and gave it to Al-Enezi.
