= 2022 Kuwaiti general election =

- 29 September 2022
- 50 of the 65 seats in the National Assembly
- Turnout: 63.30% (▼6.32pp)

General elections were held in Kuwait on 29 September 2022 following the dissolution of parliament by Crown Prince Mishal Al-Ahmad Al-Jaber Al-Sabah. However, the results were annulled by the Constitutional Court on 19 March 2023 after judges ruled that the previous parliament had not been dissolved properly.

== Background ==
On 22 June Crown Prince Sheikh Mishal Al-Ahmad Al-Jaber Al-Sabah announced the dissolution of Parliament. On 28 August, the Kuwaiti Cabinet approved the decree calling for elections on 29 September.

== Electoral system ==
The 50 elected members of the National Assembly are elected from five 10-seat constituencies by single non-transferable vote. Political parties are not officially licensed, therefore candidates run as individuals, although many political groups operate freely as de facto political parties. All Kuwaiti citizens (both male and female) above the age of 21 have the right to vote.

== Candidates ==
Registration of candidates contesting the 50 seats took place between 29 August and 7 September 2022. 118 schools were used for the 2022 National Assembly elections on 29 September. A total of 305 candidates, including 22 women, were registered.

While the previous elections in 2020 were affected by anti-coronavirus measures, this time candidates were able to open electoral offices and hold live hustings. Security services stepped up their monitoring of vote buying.

== Results ==
Turnout was 63.30 % with 503,811 voters for a total of 795,911 registered voters. Opposition politicians were reported to have made significant gains. Islamists, including many affiliated with the Muslim Brotherhood, established themselves in parliament, while Shi’ites displaced palace-aligned Sunni candidates. Many reformist candidates, including two women, also won seats.

=== Elected members ===
Constituency	Candidate	Votes
First	Abdullah Jassem Al-Mudhaf	6,375
First	Hassan Abdullah Johar	6,332
First	Osama Zaid Al-Zaid	5,764
First	Ahmed Haji Larry	4,104
First	Essa Ahmad Al-Kandari	3,683
First	Adel Jassim Al-Damkhi	3,403
First	Osama Essa Al-Shaheen	2,889
First	Saleh Ashour	2,867
First	Hamad Mohammed Al-Medlej	2,826
First	Khaled Marzouq Al-Ameera	2,228
Second	Bader Hamed Al-Mulla	7,285
Second	Mohammad Barrak Al-Mutair	4,364
Second	Shuaib Shabaan	3,394
Second	Hamed Mahri Al-Bathali	3,374
Second	Khalil Ibrahim Al-Shalih	2,949
Second	Falah Dhahi Al-Hajri	2,921
Second	Aliya Faisal Al-Khaled	2,472
Second	Hamad Mohammad Al-Matar	2,460
Second	Abdulwahab Aref Al-Issa	2,056
Second	Abdullah Turki Al-Anbaie	1,922
Third	Ahmed Abdulaziz al-Sadoun	12,239
Third	Muhalhal Khaled Al-Mudhaf	7,005
Third	Abdulkareem Abdullah Al-Kandari	6,915
Third	Muhannad Talal Al-Sayer	5,998
Third	Abdulaziz Tareq Al-Saqabi	5,329
Third	Jenan Boushehri	4,301
Third	Ammar Muhammad Al-Ajmi	3,784
Third	Hamad Adel Al-Obeid	3,376
Third	Faris Saad Al-Otaibi	3,189
Third	Khalil Abdullah Apple	2,963
Fourth	Shueib Shabab Al-Muweizri	8,995
Fourth	Mohammed Hayef Al-Mutairi	7,266
Fourth	Mubarak Hammoud Al-Tasha	7,098
Fourth	Mubarak Haif Al-Hajraf	6,342
Fourth	Thamer Saad Al-Thifeeri	5,597
Fourth	Marzouq Khalifa Al-Khalifa	5,170
Fourth	Saad Ali Al-Rusheedi	5,007
Fourth	Obaid Mohammed Al-Mutairi	4,834
Fourth	Abdullah Fahad Al-Enizi	4,825
Fourth	Yousef Mohammed Al-Bathali	4,735
Fifth	Hamdan Salem Al-Azmi	10,799
Fifth	Saud Abdulaziz Al-Hajri	10,252
Fifth	Khaled Mohammad Al-Otaibi	9,243
Fifth	Hani Hussein Shams	6,814
Fifth	Mohammad Hadi Al-Huweila	6,765
Fifth	Al-Saifi Mubarak Al-Ajmi	6,525
Fifth	Mohammed Hussain Al-Ajmi	5,725
Fifth	Majed Mussaed Al-Mutairi	5,465
Fifth	Marzouq Faleh Al-Hbaini	4,830
Fifth	Faisal Mohammed Al-Kandari	4,530
Source: KUNA (1, 2, 3, 4, 5)

== Aftermath ==
On 18 October 2022 Ahmed Al-Sadoun was elected as Speaker of the National Assembly unopposed. However on 19 March 2023 the Constitutional Court ruled in favor of reinstating the previous parliament elected in 2020, citing discrepancies in the decree dissolving the previous parliament. In May crown prince Mishal Al-Ahmad Al-Jaber Al-Sabah dissolved Parliament and called for election on 6 June 2023.
