= Ahmed Lari =

Kuwaiti politician

- أحمد لاري

Personal details
- Born: 1955 (age 70–71)
- Party: National Islamic Alliance (Taalof)
- Known for: Former member of Kuwait’s National Assembly

Ahmed Lari is a Kuwaiti politician and former member of the Kuwaiti National Assembly, representing the first district. Born in 1955, Lari studied Statistics and worked in the Municipal Council before being elected to the National Assembly in 2006. While political parties are technically illegal in Kuwait, Lari is a member of the National Islamic Alliance (Taalof), a Shia party.

== Political career ==
Lari participated in the 1993 Kuwaiti general elections representing the first district and won first place with 1,221 votes, he later participated in the 1995 Kuwaiti general elections and also won first place with 1,415 votes. Lari then also participated in the 1999 Kuwaiti general elections and won first place again with a total of 1,876 votes.

In the 2003 Kuwaiti general elections, Lari also participated and came in third place with a total of 1,362 votes and eventually lost the election. He then participated in the 2006 Kuwaiti general elections, and came in first place with 3,150 votes, ultimately winning. He then participated in the 2008 Kuwaiti general elections, came in eighth place with 6,919 votes and won the election.

== Expulsion from Popular Action Bloc ==
On February 19, 2008, the Popular Action Bloc expelled Lari and fellow Shiite MP Adnan Zahid Abdulsamad for taking part in a ceremony eulogizing Hezbollah's slain top commander, Imad Mughniyeh. The ceremony's description of the fugitive Lebanese militant — killed in a February 12 car bombing in Syria — as a hero sparked public outrage in a country that holds him responsible for hijacking a Kuwait Airways flight and killing two of its Kuwaiti passengers 20 years prior. The two lawmakers were only expelled from their bloc, and remained in the legislature. After the expulsions of the two, the seven member bloc was down to five members.

== Opposition to Grilling of Prime Minister Nasser ==
In November 2008, Waleed Al-Tabtabaie, Mohammed Al-Mutair, and Mohammed Hayef Al-Mutairi filed a request to grill Prime Minister Nasser Mohammed Al-Ahmed Al-Sabah for allowing prominent Iranian Shiite cleric Mohammad Baqir al-Fali to enter Kuwait despite a legal ban. Lari was quoted as saying that the majority of MPs, like him, were against the grilling.
