= Islamic Salafi Alliance =

Islamic Salafi Alliance التجمع الإسلامي السلفي
- Leader: Khaled Sultan bin Essa
- Founded: 1981
- Headquarters: Kuwait City
- Ideology: Islamism; Salafism
- Political position: Far-right
- Religion: Sunni Islam
- Colors: Blue, Orange

The Islamic Salafi Alliance (Arabic: التجمع الإسلامي السلفي) is a Salafi political grouping in Kuwait headed by Khaled Sultan bin Essa. It was founded in 1981. Of the fifty elected members of Kuwait National Assembly, three seats belong to the Islamic Salafi Alliance since the 2024 elections.

== Views ==
The Alliance is against political parties and protests. It is critical of the House of Sabah.

The Islamic Salafi Alliance has managed to introduce laws leading to segregation between sexes at universities, restrictions on mixed sports, dancing and live music.
