= Hamad Almatar =

Member of the Kuwaiti National Assembly

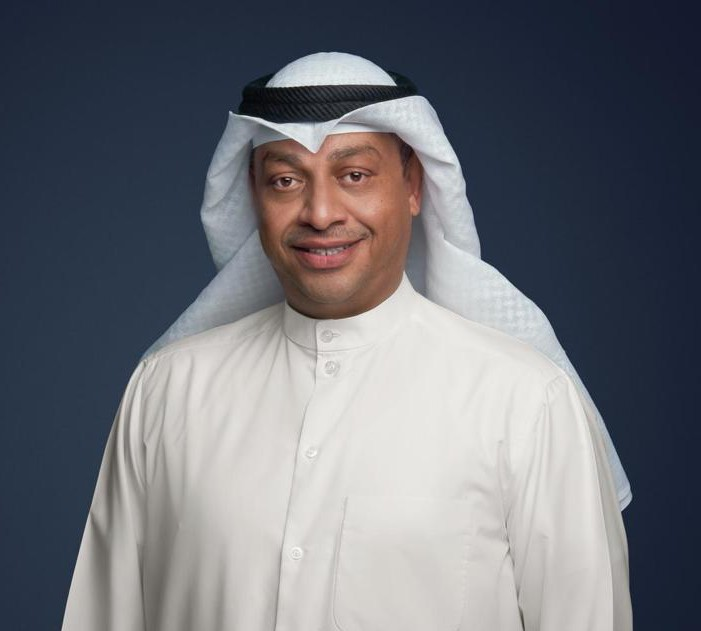
- Born: Hamad Mohammed Jassim Almatar; July 8, 1970 (age 55); Kuwait
- Education: PhD in chemistry
- Occupation: Professor at Kuwait University
- Movement: Political
- Website: http://www.halmatar.com

Hamad Mohammed Jassim Al-Matar (born July 8, 1970) is a member of the Kuwaiti National Assembly, and holds a doctorate in industrial chemistry.

He boycotted the National Assembly elections after adjusting the number of votes from four to one, in solidarity with the Popular Action Movement in 2012. Also he is a prominent member of the Islamic Brotherhood clique in the Kuwaiti Parliament Assembly.

== Memberships and achievements ==
- Director of the Consulting and Training Office at the College of Science at Kuwait University.
- Faculty member at Kuwait University - Department of Chemistry.
- A faculty member at the College of Graduate Studies-Kuwait University.
- Environmental advisor to the Kuwaiti municipal council.
- President of the Arab Chemists Union in 2005.
- President of the Kuwaiti Chemical Society from 2004 to 2006.
- President of the Kuwaiti Green Peace Organization.
- Regional Director of the Arab Federation for Chemical and Petrochemical Industries.
- An internal auditor for administrative and environmental quality systems.
- Chairman of the Environmental Advisory Board in the Arab World.
- CEO of the National Project for the Development of Environmental Awareness.
- Founding member of the Association of Trainers of the Gulf Cooperation Council.
- Member of the American Chemical Society.
- Member of the British Royal Chemical Society.
