= 1975 Kuwaiti general election =

General elections were held in Kuwait on 27 January 1975. Around 260 candidates contested the election, which saw pro-government candidates remain the largest bloc in Parliament. Voter turnout was 60.1%.

== Results ==
Party	Votes	%	Seats	+/–
Pro-government candidates			21	+1
Shi'ite candidates			10	+4
Secular opposition			7	+3
Independents			6	–7
Sunni candidates			6	0
Total			50	0
Total votes	31,848	–		
Registered voters/turnout	52,993	60.10		
Source: Nohlen et al.
