= Safa Al Hashem =

Kuwaiti politician

Member of the Kuwaiti National Assembly
- In office 2 February 2012 – 5 December 2020
- Constituency: Third District

Personal details
- Born: 1964 (age 61–62) Kuwait
- Citizenship: Kuwait
- Education: Kuwait University, Pennsylvania State University
- Website: www.safaalhashem.com

Safa Al Hashem (born April 14, 1964) is a businesswoman and a politician. She was an elected member of to the Kuwait Parliament from 2012 to 2020. She was the only woman to win a seat at the Kuwait Parliament two consecutive times.

== Education ==
Al Hashem obtained a degree in English literature from Kuwait University and completed her MBA from Pennsylvania State University. She also has a post-graduate executive education diploma from Harvard Business School.

In 2011, she was awarded a Ph.D. (Honoris causa) by the American University of Technology.

== Career ==
Al Hashem worked for the government in the Ministry of Higher Education. She later worked in various private companies being associated with PIC, PWC and the KIPCO Group. Al Hashem then started Advantage Consulting in partnership with KIPCO and Gulf One Investment Bank, Bahrain.

Al Hashem first stood for elections for 3rd Constituency in 2012 and won. After this parliament was annulled, she stood again from the same constituency and won again. In the 2012 assembly, she served as the rapporteur of the Economic and Financial Affairs committee, and was a member of the Response to the Amiri Address and Foreign Affairs committees. Al Hashem took a public stance against foreigners living in Kuwait, recommending that foreigners should be banned from obtaining driving licenses and should be taxed to walk on the country's streets. she was reelected in 2016. In 2020, she lost her seat after getting only 430 votes in 2020 compared to 3,273 in 2016. Her loss was followed by a thread of hurtful comments on social media.

Election Results
Year	Votes polled
2012	2,622 (W)
2013	2,036 (W)
2016	3,273 (W)
2020	430 (L)

== Awards ==
- 2009: Business Woman of the Year at the Middle East Business Achievement Awards
- 2007: Female CEO of the year - CEO Middle East Awards
