= Rola Dashti =

Kuwaiti economist, business executive and politician (born 1964)

- رولا عبدالله علي حاجيه دشتي
- Born: Rola Abdulla Dashti; 1964 (age 61–62)
- Education: California State University, Chico, California State University, Sacramento, Johns Hopkins University
- Occupations: Academic, economist, business executive and former politician and Former Minister of State for Planning and Development

Rola Abdulla Dashti (Arabic: رولا عبدالله علي حاجيه دشتي; born 1964) is a Kuwaiti economist and business executive and former politician and minister. Dashti lobbied for the May 2005 decree permitting Kuwaiti women to run for parliamentary elections for the first time and was one of the first female MPs elected to the Kuwaiti parliament. She subsequently served as minister of state planning and development affairs and State Assembly affairs.

== Early life ==
Dashti was born to a Shi'ite Muslim family and has 23 siblings. Her father, Abdullah Ali Dashti is Kuwaiti of Iranian origins and her mother is Lebanese. Dashti earned a bachelor's degree from California State University, Chico in 1984, a master's degree from California State University, Sacramento in 1985, and a Ph.D. in population dynamics from Johns Hopkins University in 1993, with a dissertation on the dynamics of teacher supply in Kuwait.

== Career ==
Dashti is CEO of FARO International, a financial services consultancy, and a board member of Damac Kuwaiti Holding Co.

Following the 1990–1991 Iraqi invasion of Kuwait, Dashti managed emergency reconstruction contracts for the State of Kuwait and then participated in the effort to bring about the release of Kuwaiti prisoners held by Iraq. She was the first woman elected president of the Kuwait Economic Society and the first woman ever elected to head a Kuwaiti professional association

Dashti lobbied for the May 2005 decree permitting Kuwaiti women to vote and run for parliamentary election. She was one of 28 female candidates in the 2006 parliamentary election, the first open to women. In 2006 and 2008 she did not win the election; in May 2009 she was one of the first four women elected to the Kuwaiti Parliament.

In parliament, Dashti chaired the social affairs, labor, and health committee. In October 2011, she was also appointed to the budget committee and the committee for responding to the Emir's speech.

Dashti was not reelected in 2012. She was subsequently the only woman appointed to the new Kuwaiti cabinet, as state minister for planning and development and state minister for National Assembly affairs; she was reappointed that December.

Dashti has also served as Manager of Economics at the Kuwait Institute for Scientific Research and as an economist for the Kuwait National Bank, and has been a consultant to the World Bank and on the Executive Committee of the Kuwait chapter of Young Arab Leaders. She chaired the 2015–2016 World Economic Forum Global Agenda Council on the Middle East and North Africa.

== Honors ==
In 2005, Dashti won The King Hussein Humanitarian Award. She was listed by Arabian Business among their 100 most influential Arabs for 2007 and 2008.

In 2010, she won the North–South Prize alongside Mikhail Gorbachev.
