= Jenan Boushehri =

Kuwaiti politician (born 1973 or 1974)

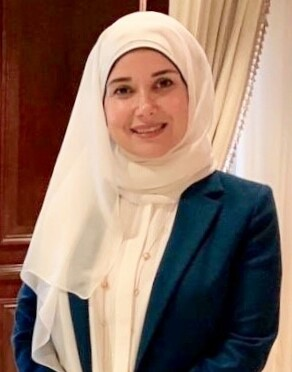
Picture of Jenan Bousheri

Jenan Mohsin Ramadan Boushehri (born 1973 or 1974) is a Kuwaiti politician. She was one of the first two women to run for election in Kuwait, and held various positions in the Cabinet until her resignation on 12 November 2019.

== Career ==
Boushehri has a master's degree in chemical engineering from Kuwait University and a doctorate from Ain Shams University in Cairo. She was head of the food-testing department at the Kuwait Municipality. In the 2006 Salmiya council by-election, when Kuwaiti women were allowed to vote for the first time, she was one of the first two female candidates seeking election.

=== Ministerial career ===
On 11 December 2017, Boushehri was announced as Minister for Service Affairs and Minister for Housing. In the 2018 cabinet reshuffle, she was made Minister for Housing and Minister for Public Works.

Boushehri oversaw various infrastructure developments as a minister, such as a $356million road project connecting several high-density residential areas, and a Chinese proposal to create thousands of new houses within the country. As part of her role, she attended the 74th Session of the United Nations General Assembly on 25 September 2019.

=== Resignation as minister ===
On 12 November 2019, MP Omar Al-Tabtabaee requested an interpellation session against Boushehri. He argued that she had failed to complete state infrastructure projects, such as the Jamal Abdul Nasser Highway project, and the country had incurred huge monetary losses as a result. Boushehri responded that she had started 95 projects within the country, while several others were in various stages of discussion.

Despite her rebuttal, 10 MPs signed a motion of no-confidence in her, and she resigned shortly after the National Assembly discussed her interpellation.

Another no-confidence motion was signed by 10 opposition MPs against Interior Minister Khaled Al Jarrah Al Sabah on the same day, which MP Yousef Al-Fadhalah suggested was the real reason behind Boushehri's interpellation and resignation. The government resigned two days later on 14 November.
