= Civil Conservative Party =

Civil Conservative Party حزب المحافظين المدني
- Leader: Mohammed Al-Mutayrat
- Founded: June 2014; 10 years ago
- Ideology: Paternalistic conservatism Islamic democracy Nationalism
- Political position: Centre-right

Website
- http://ccpkuwait.com/

The Civil Conservative Party (Arabic: حزب المحافظين المدني, CCP) is a political grouping in Kuwait.
