= Sadoon Al-Otaibi =

Kuwaiti politician (born 1959)

Sadoon Al-Otaibi (born 2 August 1959) was a former member of the Kuwaiti National Assembly, representing the fifth district. Elected to the National Assembly in 2008, Al-Otaibi is an Independent deputy.

== Recount ==
The tenth representative from the fifth district was originally Abdullah Al-Ajmi. However, on September 22, 2008, following a vote recount, the constitutional court repealed Al-Ajmi's seat and gave it to Al-Otaibi.

== Minimum wage ==
Al-Otaibi and Khalaf Al-Enezi have both dismissed past minimum wage increases as “too small” and not enough to meet the steep hikes in consumer prices. On February 21, the parliament approved a 120 dinar ($440) monthly pay rise for nationals in the public and private sectors after inflation hit a 15-year high. It also decided to raise by 50 dinars ($183) the pay of foreigners employed by the government. In response, Al-Otaibi said, “The pay raise announced by the government is very disappointing and too small. It will do nothing in the face of the excessive rise in prices of consumer goods...We will pass a law to add at least another 50 dinars ($183)

The average monthly salary of Kuwaiti employees is more than 1,000 dinars ($3,650), but lower for expatriates.
