= Adnan Zahid Abdulsamad =

Member of the Kuwaiti National Assembly (born 1950)

Sayyid Adnan Zahid Abdulsamad
- عدنان زاهد عبدالصمد

Personal details
- Party: National Islamic Alliance (Tahalof)
- Known for: Former member of Kuwait’s National assembly, founding the National Islamic Alliance

Adnan Zahid Abdulsamad was a former member of the Kuwaiti National Assembly, representing the first district. Born in 1950, Abdulsamad studied political science and worked in the Oil Ministry before being elected to the National Assembly in 1981. While political parties are technically illegal in Kuwait, Abdulsamad affiliates with the National Islamic Alliance (Tahalof), a Shia party.

== Supported severing ties with Denmark ==
On November 6, 2006, the parliament voted 22–15 to approve severing diplomatic ties with Denmark over the Jyllands-Posten Muhammad cartoons controversy and spending about US$50 (€39.20) million to defend the prophet's image in the West. Both votes were nonbinding, meaning the Cabinet did not have to abide by them. Abdulsamad voted in favor of cutting diplomatic ties, saying, ""We have to cut diplomatic and commercial ties with Denmark... We don't have to eat Danish cheese."

== Temporary marriage mini-series controversy ==
On September 16, 2007, Abdulsamad and fellow Shia MP Saleh Ashour spoke out against a planned Ramadan soap opera miniseries titled ‘’Sins Have a Price’’, which was to revolve around and criticize the Shiite form of temporary marriage known as "Mutaa." In a public statement, Abdulsamad accused the series of giving "a total distortion of Shiism ... It also incites sectarianism... It is very provocative and comes at a sensitive time amid the sectarian tension in the region."

Abdulsamad charged that besides stoking sectarianism, the serial insults and distorts the Shia faith by mocking temporary marriage, a valid, sanctioned concept in Shiism despite the controversy and social taboos surrounding the practice.

== Expulsion from Popular Action Bloc ==
On February 19, 2008, the Popular Action Bloc expelled Abdulsamad and fellow Shia MP Ahmed Lari for taking part in a ceremony eulogizing Hezbollah's slain top commander, Imad Mughniyeh. The ceremony's description of the fugitive Lebanese militant – killed in a February 12 car bombing in Syria – as a hero sparked public outrage in a country that holds him responsible for hijacking a Kuwait Airways flight and killing two of its Kuwaiti passengers 20 years prior. The two lawmakers were only expelled from their bloc, and remained in the legislature. After the expulsions of the two, the seven member bloc was down to five members.
