= 2016 Kuwaiti general election =

General election in Kuwait

| ← 2013 | 26 November 2016 | 2020 → |
- 50 of the 65 seats in the National Assembly
- Turnout: 65.2% (▲13.3pp)

Early general elections were held in Kuwait on 26 November 2016. They follow the dissolution of the parliament elected in 2013 by Emir Sabah Al-Ahmad Al-Jaber Al-Sabah in October 2016. Under the constitution, elections must be held within two months. Opposition candidates won 24 of the 50 seats in the National Assembly. Voter turnout was around 70 percent.

== Electoral system ==
The 50 elected members of the National Assembly were elected from five 10-seat constituencies by single non-transferable vote.

== Results ==
Opposition Islamist candidates (Muslim Brotherhood and Salafi) won around half of the 24 seats won by the opposition, whilst the Shia minority was reduced to six seats from ten seats. One woman was elected, with only around 20 of the 42 MPs seeking re-election retaining their seats. Members of Kuwait's largest tribes together won just seven seats in the election, down from fifteen.

| Constituency | Candidate | Votes | Notes |
|---|---|---|---|
| First Constituency | Adnan Zahid Abdulsamad | 4,287 | Elected |
| First Constituency | Essa Ahmad Al-Kanderi | 4,077 | Elected |
| First Constituency | Mohammad Mirwi Al-Hadiyah | 3,016 | Elected |
| First Constituency | Adel Jassem Al-Damkhi | 2,758 | Elected |
| First Constituency | Abdullah Al-Roumi | 2,731 | Elected |
| First Constituency | Saleh Ashour | 2,541 | Elected |
| First Constituency | Mubarak Salem Al-Harees | 2,444 | Elected |
| First Constituency | Osama Essa Al-Shaheen | 2,270 | Elected |
| First Constituency | Khaled Hussein Al-Shatti | 2,166 | Elected |
| First Constituency | Salah Abduredha Khourshid | 2,131 | Elected |
| Second Constituency | Marzouq Al-Ghanim | 4,119 | Elected |
| Second Constituency | Riyadh Ahmad Al-Adsani | 3,578 | Elected |
| Second Constituency | Khalil Ibrahim Al-Saleh | 2,914 | Elected |
| Second Constituency | Jamaan Thaher Al-Herbish | 2,432 | Elected |
| Second Constituency | Hamad Seif Al-Harshani | 2,341 | Elected |
| Second Constituency | Mohammed Al-Mutair | 2,172 | Elected |
| Second Constituency | Khalaf Dumaitheer Al-Enizi | 1,942 | Elected |
| Second Constituency | Rakan Al-Nisf | 1,888 | Elected |
| Second Constituency | Oudah Oudah Al-Ruwaiee | 1,772 | Elected |
| Second Constituency | Omar Al-Tabtabaee | 1,755 | Elected |
| Third Constituency | Abdulwahab Al-Babtain | 3,730 | Elected |
| Third Constituency | Sadoon Al-Otaibi | 3,444 | Elected |
| Third Constituency | Youssef Saleh Al-Fedhalah | 3,399 | Elected |
| Third Constituency | Abdulkarim Al-Kanderi | 3,325 | Elected |
| Third Constituency | Safaa Abdurrahman Al-Hashim | 3,273 | Elected |
| Third Constituency | Mohammad Hussein Al-Dalaal | 2,533 | Elected |
| Third Constituency | Waleed Al-Tabtabaie | 2,504 | Elected |
| Third Constituency | Khalil Abdullah Abul | 2,443 | Elected |
| Third Constituency | Mohammad Nasser Al-Jabri | 2,219 | Elected |
| Third Constituency | Ahmad Nabil Al-Fadhel | 2,124 | Elected |
| Fourth Constituency | Thamer Saad Al-Thifeeri | 5,601 | Elected |
| Fourth Constituency | Mubarak Haif Al-Hajraf | 4,621 | Elected |
| Fourth Constituency | Mohammed Hayef Al-Mutairi | 4,506 | Elected |
| Fourth Constituency | Saad Ali Al-Rusheedi | 3,811 | Elected |
| Fourth Constituency | Abdullah Fahad Al-Enizi | 3,545 | Elected |
| Fourth Constituency | Shueib Shabab Al-Muweizri | 3,528 | Elected |
| Fourth Constituency | Ali Salem Al-Deqbasi | 3,379 | Elected |
| Fourth Constituency | Askar Auwayed Al-Enizi | 2,972 | Elected |
| Fourth Constituency | Saud Mohammad Al-Shuwaier | 2,897 | Elected |
| Fourth Constituency | Marzouq Khalifa Al-Khalifa | 2,874 | Elected |
| Fifth Constituency | Humoud Abdullah Al-Khudeir | 5,072 | Elected |
| Fifth Constituency | Hamdan Salem Al-Azmi | 5,038 | Elected |
| Fifth Constituency | Al-Humaidi Bader Al-Subaiee | 4,660 | Elected |
| Fifth Constituency | Talal Saad Al-Jalaal | 4,299 | Elected |
| Fifth Constituency | Faisal Mohammad Al-Kanderi | 4,114 | Elected |
| Fifth Constituency | Khaled Mohammad Al-Otaibi | 3,998 | Elected |
| Fifth Constituency | Majed Musaaed Al-Mutairi | 3,821 | Elected |
| Fifth Constituency | Nayef Abdulaziz Al-Ajmi | 3,769 | Elected |
| Fifth Constituency | Nasser Saad Al-Doussari | 3,296 | Elected |
| Fifth Constituency | Mohammad Hadi Al-Huweila | 2,851 | Elected |
Source: KUNA (1, 2, 3, 4, 5)

== Aftermath ==
Following the elections, a new Speaker of the National Assembly was elected on 11 December. Marzouq Al-Ghanim was elected with 48 votes, defeating Abdullah Al-Roumi (9 votes) and Shuaib Al-Muwaizri (8 votes).

| Candidate | Party | Votes | % |
|---|---|---|---|
| Marzouq Al-Ghanim | Independent | 48 | 73.85 |
| Abdullah Al-Roumi | Independent | 9 | 13.85 |
| Shuaib Al-Muwaizri | Independent | 8 | 12.31 |
| Total | | 65 | 100.00 |
| Valid votes | | 65 | 100.00 |
| Invalid/blank votes | | 0 | 0.00 |
| Total votes | | 65 | 100.00 |
| Registered voters/turnout | | 65 | 100.00 |
