= Al-Erada Square =

Coordinates: 29.3700°N 47.9616°E

Al-Erada Square (also known as Erada Square) is a public gathering square in Kuwait City, Kuwait, located in front of the Kuwait National Assembly Building. It is notable for being the location of Arab Spring protests in Kuwait. Among other events, it was the site of assembly of protesters who entered parliament calling for the resignation of prime minister Nasser Al-Sabah.
