= Abdulwahab Al-Babtain =

Kuwaiti politician

- عَبْدُالوَهَّابِ البَابْطِين
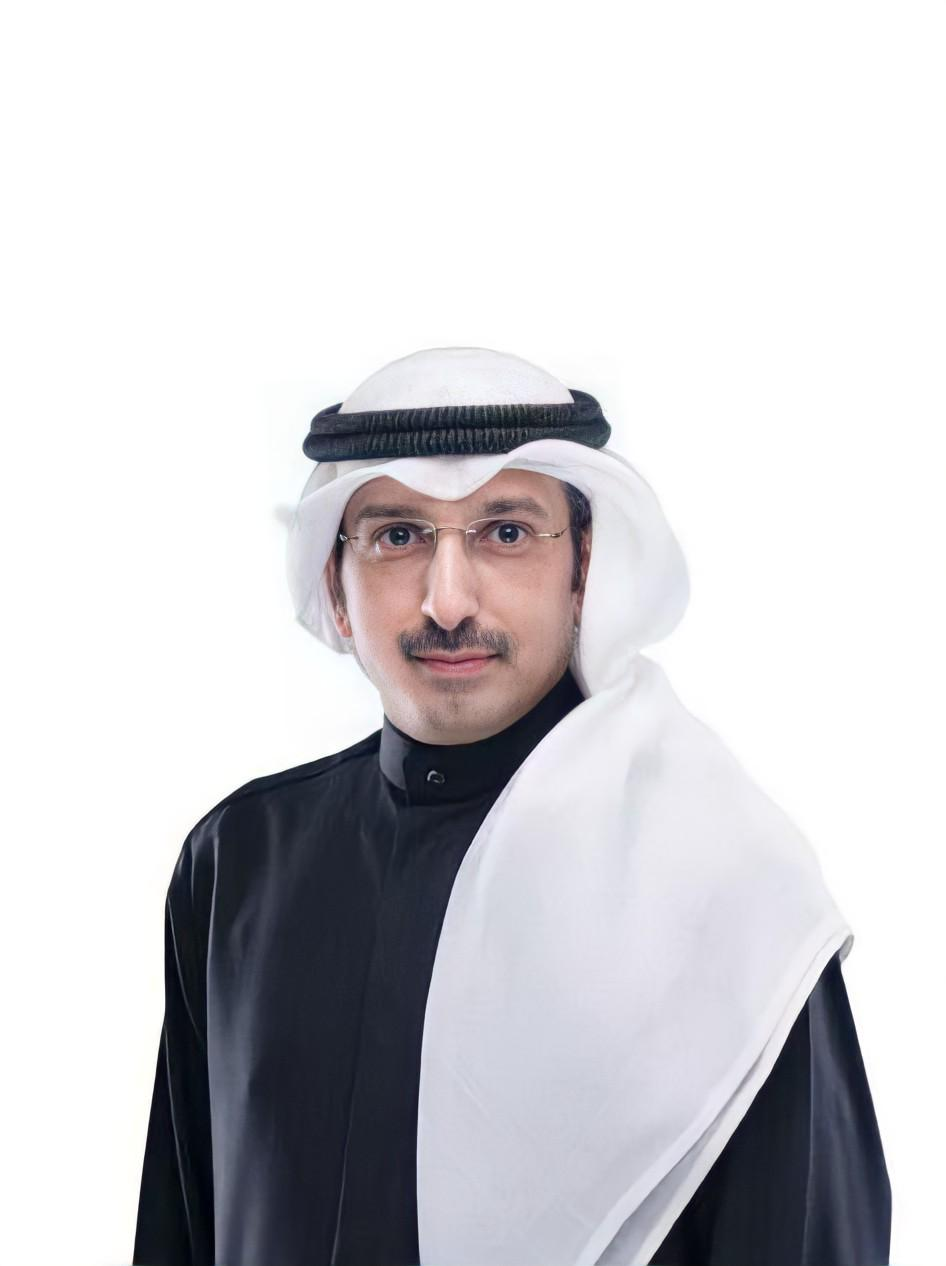
- Born: 1985 (age 40–41)
- Citizenship: Kuwait
- Education: Bachelor of Business Administration in Accounting. Kuwait University
- Occupation: Politician
- Known for: Member of Parliament of the Kuwait Parliament.

Abdulwahab Mohammad Al-Babtain (Arabic: عبدالوهاب محمد البابطين; born 1985) is a Kuwaiti politician, who is a former member of the Kuwait Parliament. In the Kuwaiti General Election of 2016, which was his first time running for office, he secured the first seat in the third constituency with 3,730 votes. Al-Babtain served on several parliamentary committees, including the Financial and Economic Affairs Committee and the Public Money Protection Committee.
