= Popular Action Bloc =

Popular Action Bloc كتلة العمل الشعبي
- Leader: Musallam Al-Barrak
- Founded: 1992
- Headquarters: Kuwait City
- Ideology: Populism; Nationalism
- Political position: Centre-left
- National Assembly: 2 / 50

The Popular Action Bloc (Arabic: كتلة العمل الشعبي, Hashd) is a political bloc in Kuwait headed by opposition figurehead Musallam Al-Barrak. The group focuses on populist issues like housing, salary raises, and reform.

== Expulsion of Shiite MPs ==
On 19 February 2008, the Popular Action Bloc expelled Shiite MPs Ahmed Lari and Adnan Zahid Abdulsamad for taking part in a ceremony eulogizing Hezbollah's slain top commander, Imad Mughniyah. The ceremony's description of the fugitive Lebanese militant – killed in a 12 February car bombing in Syria – as a hero sparked public outrage in a country that holds him responsible for hijacking a Kuwait Airways flight and killing two of its Kuwaiti passengers 20 years ago. The two lawmakers were only expelled from their bloc and remained in the legislature. After the expulsions of the two, the seven member bloc was down to five members.

== Election results ==
=== National Assembly ===
National Assembly
Election	Party leader	Seats	+/–
1999	Ahmed Al-Sadoun	10 / 50	New
2003	Ahmed Al-Sadoun	5 / 50	▼5
2006	Ahmed Al-Sadoun	9 / 50	▲4
2008	Ahmed Al-Sadoun	9 / 50	0
2009	Ahmed Al-Sadoun	5 / 50	▼4
2012 (Feb)	Ahmed Al-Sadoun	11 / 50	▲6
2022	Musallam Al-Barrak	0 / 50	▼11
2023	Musallam Al-Barrak	1 / 50	▲1
2024	Musallam Al-Barrak	2 / 50	▲1
