= 1992 Kuwaiti general election =

General election in Kuwait

General elections were held in Kuwait on 20 October 1992. A total of 275 candidates contested the election, which saw independents win the largest number of seats, and candidates opposed to the government win a total of 31 seats. Voter turnout was 83%.

== Background ==
As a result of increasing conflict between the ruling family and the elected parliament, the parliament had been disbanded in 1986. The USA, supported by the international community, made its support of the ruling family during the Gulf War conditional on the restoration of democracy, which was agreed to by the Emir in the Jeddah conference of October 1990.

== Electoral system ==
Voting rights were restricted to men who could provide proof of that their ancestors were residing in Kuwait in 1920,. This resulted the number of eligible voters to 14% of the citizenry.

== Results ==
Party	Votes	%	Seats
Independents			20
Pro-government candidates			18
Sunni candidates			7
Shi'ite candidates			3
Secular opposition			2
Total			50
Total votes	67,724	–	
Registered voters/turnout	81,440	83.16	
Source: Nohlen et al.
