= Omar Al-Tabtabaee =

Kuwait politician

- عمر الطبطبائي
- Born: 1980
- Citizenship: Kuwait
- Education: Master of Business Administration MBA. Master of Public Policy MPP, London School of Economics and Political Science. Bachelor of Engineering in Electrical Engineering.Bachelor of Business Administration in Accounting, Certified Financial Analyst.
- Alma mater: Gulf University for Science and Technology, University of Colorado Denver, American Academy of Financial Management.
- Occupation: Politician
- Organization(s): Kuwait Graduates Association, Kuwait Engineers Association.
- Known for: Member of Parliament of the Kuwait Parliament.

Omar Abdulmuhsin Al-Tabtabaee (Arabic: عمر الطبطبائي) (born 1980) is a politician, who was an elected Member of Parliament of the Kuwait Parliament. As the Kuwaiti General Election 2016 was his first stand for elections, he won the tenth chair in the second constituency by 1,755 votes.

Al-Tabtabaee contributed in the following parliamentary committees:

- Education, Culture and Guidance Affairs Committee
- Public Money Protection Committee
