= National Islamic Alliance =

Political organization in Kuwait

National Islamic Alliance التحالف الوطني الإسلامي
- Leader: Adnan Zahid Abdulsamad
- Headquarters: Kuwait City
- Ideology: Islamism
- Religion: Shi'a Islam
- National Assembly: 3 / 64

The National Islamic Alliance (Arabic: التحالف الوطني الإسلامي) is a Shia political organization in Kuwait. Of the fifty elected members of Kuwait National Assembly in 2008, two belong to the National Islamic Alliance: Adnan Zahid Abdulsamad and Ahmed Lari.

One of the main objectives of the NIA in Kuwait is to promote social justice and combat corruption in the country. The alliance has been critical of the current political system in Kuwait, which it believes is dominated by corrupt elites and does not represent the true interests of the people. The NIA has called for a number of reforms, including the establishment of an independent judiciary and the elimination of political corruption.

The NIA in Kuwait has also been involved in efforts to promote religious unity and to combat extremism and sectarianism. The alliance has organized several interfaith events and has spoken out against violence and intolerance in the name of religion.

== See also ==
- List of Islamic political parties
