= 2003 Kuwaiti general election =

General election in Kuwait

General elections were held in Kuwait on 5 July 2003 to elect the 50 members of the National Assembly. As political parties are illegal in the country, all candidates stood as independents.

== Results ==
26 of the elected members were identified being as supporters of the government and Independents. Three as liberals and 21 as Islamists (Sunni and Shia).

Party	Votes	%	Seats
Islamist candidates			21
Pro-government candidates			14
Independents			12
Liberals			3
Total			50
Registered voters/turnout	136,714	–	
Source: IPU, Psephos
