= 2008 Kuwaiti general election =

Early general elections were held in Kuwait on 17 May 2008 after the Emir Sabah Al-Sabah dissolved the National Assembly of Kuwait on 19 March 2008 over constant clashes between the government and the elected MPs. The last elections were held less than two years previously and saw a loose alliance of reformists and Islamists gain almost two thirds of the seats.

Nearly 362,000 Kuwaitis were eligible to vote, more than half of them women, and 27 of the 275 candidates were women; none of the female candidates won.

New rules introduced for this election have changed the 25 constituencies electing two to five electing 10. This was a demand of the reformist Kuwaiti Orange Movement, which led mass demonstrations in 2006, who believed the change would impede vote buying electoral frauds.

A leading theme in the election was inflation, which hit a record high 9.5% four months before the election. Many candidates in the election proposed increased governmental subsidies to be funded by oil profits.

== Results ==
Party	Votes	%	Seats
Sunni candidates			21
Independents			13
Popular Action Bloc			9
Liberals			7
Total			50
Total votes	214,886	–	
Registered voters/turnout	361,684	59.41	
Source: IFES

== Aftermath ==
Following the election, Jassem Al-Kharafi was elected speaker.

Candidate	Party	Votes	%
Jassem Al-Kharafi	Independent	52	82.54
Abdullah Al-Roumi	Independent	11	17.46
Total		63	100.00
Valid votes		63	96.92
Invalid/blank votes		2	3.08
Total votes		65	100.00
Registered voters/turnout		65	100.00
