= Kuwait's First Constituency =

Constituency in Kuwait

Constituency One
- Multi-member constituency for the National Assembly of Kuwait
- Electorate: 100,185

Current constituency
- Created: 2008
- Seats: 10

The first constituency of Kuwait is a legislative constituency in Kuwait. Like the other four constituencies in Kuwait, it elects exactly 10 members to the National Assembly via plurality vote. As of 2022, it currently represents twenty residential areas and has an electorate of 100,185. The Hawalli and Capital governates are divided between the first, second and third constituencies.

== Representatives of Constituency One ==
Members of National Assembly
Year	Members
2022	Abdullah Jassim Al-Mudhaf; Adel Jassim Al-Damkhi; Ahmad Haji Lari; Hamad Mohammed Al-Madlej; Hassan Abdullah Jawhar; Issa Ahmad Al-Kanderi; Khaled Marzouq Al-Amera; Osama Issa Al-Shaheen; Osama Zaid Al-Zaid; Saleh Ashour
2023	Abdullah Jassim Al-Mudhaf; Adel Jassim Al-Damkhi; Ahmad Haji Lari; Dawood Suleiman Marafi; Hamad Mohammed Al-Madlej; Hassan Abdullah Jawhar; Issa Ahmad Al-Kanderi; Khaled Marzouq Al-Amera; Osama Issa Al-Shaheen; Osama Zaid Al-Zaid

== Areas in Constituency One ==
There are a total of 100185 voters (51575 female voters; 48610 male voters).

- Sharq
- Al-Dasma
- Dasman
- Bneid Al-Gar
- Al-Da’eya
- Al-Sha’ab
- Failaka and other Islands
- Hawalli
- Bayan
- Mishrif
- Salmiya
- Al-Bida’a,
- Salwa
- Rumaithiya
- Mubarak Al-Abdullah
- Anjafa

== See also ==
- Constituencies of the National Assembly of Kuwait
- Demographics of Kuwait
