= 2006 Kuwaiti general election =

General election in Kuwait

General elections were held in Kuwait on 29 June 2006. They were the first elections in Kuwait in which women were able to vote and run for office.

== Background ==
The National Assembly was dissolved by Emir Sabah Al-Ahmad Al-Jaber Al-Sabah on 21 May 2006 after a month-long stalemate in the Assembly over an electoral reform bill. The government had sought to reduce the number of constituencies from 25 to ten, whilst the opposition favoured reducing the number to five; the reduction was aimed at reducing the effect of gerrymandering.

== Electoral system ==
Following electoral reforms in May 2005, suffrage was extended to women and all Kuwaiti citizens 21 or older were allowed to vote, except for members of the armed forces.

== Campaign ==
A total of 253 candidates ran in the elections, including 28 women.

== Results ==
Although 54% of the eligible voters in Kuwait were women, female voters made up only 35% of the total. Pro-reform candidates were estimated to have won 33 seats, an increase of four from the 2003 elections. No women were elected. An additional 15 members of the cabinet also became members of the National Assembly.

Party	Votes	%	Seats	+/–
Islamist candidates			21	0
Pro-government candidates			14	0
Independents			12	0
Liberals			3	0
Total			50	0
Valid votes	310,879	99.40		
Invalid/blank votes	1,883	0.60		
Total votes	312,762	100.00		
Registered voters/turnout	340,248	91.92		
Source: IPU

== Aftermath ==
The newly elected National Assembly opened on 12 July, with Jassem Al-Kharafi elected Speaker, beating Ahmed Al-Sadoun.

Candidate	Party	Votes	%
Jassem Al-Kharafi	Independent	36	56.25
Ahmed Al-Sadoun	Popular Action Bloc	28	43.75
Total		64	100.00
Valid votes		64	98.46
Invalid/blank votes		1	1.54
Total votes		65	100.00
Registered voters/turnout		65	100.00

In late July 2006, an electoral reform law was approved, cutting the number of voting constituencies from 25 to five. Although no women were elected to the National Assembly, one woman was appointed to the 16-member cabinet headed by Prime Minister Nasser Al-Sabah.
