= 1999 Kuwaiti general election =

General election in Kuwait

General elections were held in Kuwait on 4 July 1999. A total of 288 candidates contested the election, which saw pro-government candidates and secular opposition candidates emerge as the two largest blocs in Parliament. Voter turnout was 83%.

== Results ==
Party	Votes	%	Seats	+/–
Pro-government candidates			14	–5
Secular opposition			14	+10
Sunni candidates			10	–6
Independents			6	0
Shi'ite candidates			6	+1
Total			50	0
Total votes	93,996	–		
Registered voters/turnout	112,882	83.27		
Source: Nohlen et al.

== Aftermath ==
Jassem Al-Kharafi unseated Ahmed Al-Sadoun as Speaker after the election.

Candidate	Party	Votes	%
Jassem Al-Kharafi	Independent	37	57.81
Ahmed Al-Sadoun	Independent	27	42.19
Total		64	100.00
Valid votes		64	98.46
Invalid/blank votes		1	1.54
Total votes		65	100.00
Registered voters/turnout		65	100.00
