= Bader Al-Dahoum =

Kuwaiti politician

Bader Aldahoum
- Born: Bader Zayed Hamad Aldahom Alazmi; March 16, 1975 (age 50); Kuwait
- Education: PhD in Islamic law & comparative jurisprudence
- Occupation: Professor at Kuwait International Law School
- Movement: Political

Bader Zayed Hamad Aldahoum Alazmi (born 16 March 1975) is a Kuwaiti politician who serves as a head of the Political Bureau of the National Constants' Assembly, and a former deputy in the Kuwaiti National Assembly.

== Biography ==
He participated in the Kuwaiti National Assembly elections (February 2012) and won 15,027 votes achieving the third place in the Fifth District, then boycotted the elections due to the one-vote decree, then he came back and ran in the 2020 Kuwaiti National Assembly elections for the fifth constituency and got the second place with 8,371 votes and won, He holds a doctorate and a master's degree in jurisprudence and its fundamentals, a teacher of Islamic education, and the former chairman of the board of directors of the Jaber Al-Ali Cooperative Society.

== Re-nomination and annulment of his membership ==
On December 3, 2020, the Court of Cassation ruled conclusively to reinstate him to the candidates status. On March 14, 2021, the Kuwaiti Constitutional Court ruled to revoke the membership of the opposing representative, Badr Aldahom, due to accusations related to insulting the Emirati personality.

It is reported that Aldahom is known for his criticism of the Kuwaiti government and National Assembly Speaker Marzouq Al-Ghanim, who denied this accusation.
