= Justice and Peace Alliance =

Justice and Peace Alliance تجمع العدالة والسلام
- Leader: Saleh Ashour
- Founded: 31 December 2004
- Headquarters: Kuwait City
- Ideology: Islamism
- Religion: Shi'a Islam (Shirazi)

The Justice and Peace Alliance (Arabic: تجمع العدالة والسلام), sometimes translated as the Justice and Peace Gathering, is a moderate Shi'a political bloc in Kuwait. Of the fifty elected members of the Kuwait National Assembly, only one belongs to the Justice and Peace Alliance: Saleh Ashour.

The bloc's members are followers of the Shirazi school of thought, which opposes Hezbollah and the Islamic Republic of Iran.

== See also ==
- List of Islamic political parties
