= 2013 Kuwaiti general election =

← December 2012	27 July 2013	2016 →
- 50 of the 65 seats in the National Assembly
- Turnout: 51.9% (▲12.3pp)

Early general elections were held in Kuwait on 27 July 2013. The elections were required after the Constitutional Court dissolved Parliament and annulled the results of the December 2012 elections. Voter turnout was an estimated 52.5%, which was higher than expected despite an opposition boycott, and only 7% lower than the non-boycotted February 2012 elections.

== Background ==
Early elections had been held in December 2012 after the National Assembly elected in February 2012 was dissolved by the Constitutional Court, as the dissolution of the previous Assembly elected in 2009 by Emir Sabah Al-Sabah was deemed to be unconstitutional. Six weeks before the December 2012 elections, the electoral law was changed to reduce the number of votes voters could cast from four to one. The changes were rejected by opposition groups, claiming that it would allow the government to manipulate the elections.

According to the constitution, elections had to be held within 60 days of the dissolution on 16 June. They were originally scheduled for 25 July, but were later postponed due to delays in the candidate registration process; the electoral law required registration had to start a month before the election, but the cabinet put process on hold whilst it waited for the Constitutional Court to publish the reasons for ruling that dissolved the previous National Assembly.

== Campaign ==
The secular National Democratic Alliance announced that it would contest the elections after boycotting the December 2012 elections. However, other liberal parties, together with nationalist groups said they would boycott the July elections.

== Results ==
According to the Associated Press, liberal lawmakers gained at least six seats. The Congressional Research Service reported that liberals won 9 seats, making them the largest political bloc in the parliament after pro-government Independents. Fox News reported that the tribal bloc won at least 10 seats in the 50-member parliament. Two women were elected. Sunni Islamists won 3 seats. The Shia group was initially reduced to eight seats after winning 17 seats in December 2012. Following a parliamentary by-election in 2014, the Shia group increased their share to 10 seats in the parliament. Overall, there were 36 Independent MPs.

Party	Votes	%	Seats
Independent (Sunni and Shia)			36
Liberals			9
Women			2
Sunni Islamist			3
Total			50
Total votes	228,314	–	
Registered voters/turnout	439,911	51.90	
Source: IPU, Kuwait Politics Database

== Aftermath ==
Following the elections, Marzouq Al-Ghanim was elected Speaker with 36 of the 65 votes, defeating Ali Al-Rashid (18 votes) and Roudhan Al-Roudhan (8).

Candidate	Party	Votes	%
Marzouq Al-Ghanim	Independent	36	58.06
Ali Al-Rashid	Independent	18	29.03
Roudhan Al-Roudhan	Independent	8	12.90
Ali al-Omair	Independent	0	0.00
Total		62	100.00
Valid votes		62	98.41
Invalid/blank votes		1	1.59
Total votes		63	100.00
Registered voters/turnout		65	96.92
