= Saleh Ashour =

Former member of the Kuwaiti National Assembly

- صالح عاشور

Member of the Kuwait National Assembly
- In office 1999–2022
- Monarchs: Jaber Al-Ahmad Al-Sabah; Sabah Al-Ahmad Al-Sabah
- Constituency: First District

Personal details
- Born: Saleh Ahmed Hasan Ashour; 1953 (age 71–72) Kuwait
- Parent: Ahmed Ashour

Saleh Ashour (Arabic: صالح عاشور; born 1953) is a former member of the Kuwaiti National Assembly who represented Constituency One from 1999 until 2020 and again in 2022.

== Early life ==
Ashour was born in 1953 in Kuwait, to Ahmed Ashour. He is of Iranian descent from Tarakma. Ashour studied economics and served in the Kuwaiti Air Force before being elected to the National Assembly in 1999. While political parties are technically illegal in Kuwait, Ashour affiliates with the Justice and Peace Alliance, a Shia party.

== Response to attack on Shia mosque ==
On October 10, 2005, Ashour asked the authorities to ensure protection for a Shiite mosque which was attacked by a fifty-person mob on a Friday night. The teenage mob set fire in a car in front of the mosque in al-Jahra city and threw stones at worshippers. Ashour added that the gathering raised banners against the Shiites, accusing them of helping the American forces in Iraq.

Ashour further requested that the non-citizens who took part in the incident be deported: "the young persons who took part in the incident were not small children who did not know the results of their actions or the consequences of attacking a house of God."

== Critical of redistricting ==
On May 13, 2009, the parliament voted 60-2 to reduce the number of districts from 25 to five. Ashour was critical of the redistricting on the grounds that the districts were uneven in size: "No one in the chamber is opposed to the five constituencies, but there are differences about the geographic distribution." Later that week, Ashour held a rally outside the parliament building, telling the crowd: "The government bill is unfair and racist. It discriminates between Kuwaitis. It gives 70,000 Kuwaiti voters twenty MPs and the remaining 250,000 thirty MPs. Is this fair?" Ashour also argued that the redistricting would promote tribalism.

== Shiite Miniseries controversy ==
On September 16, 2007, Ashour and fellow Shia MP Adnan Abdulsamad spoke out against a planned Ramadan soap opera miniseries titled "Sins Have a Price" which was to revolve around and criticize the Shiite form of temporary marriage known as "Mutaa". In a public statement, Ashour declared that, "This would spark more disputes especially amid the spread of sectarianism in the region, evident by events in Iraq and Lebanon."

Ashour charged that besides stoking sectarianism, the serial insults and distorts the Shia faith by mocking temporary marriage, a valid, sanctioned concept in Shiism despite the controversy and social taboos surrounding the practice.

== Opposed zakat law ==
In November 2007, the parliament voted 51-2 to approve a law requiring all Kuwaiti public and shareholding companies to pay Zakat every year. Ashour voted against the law, arguing that it was discriminatory and that Shiites should demonstrate against it: "Passage of anti-minority laws in the Parliament will force us to voice out our objections through demonstrations and we will exhaust all legal means including the media to oppose such laws."

== Criticized Education Minister Nouria al-Subeih ==
On January 22, 2008, the parliament voted 27-19, with two abstentions, against the impeachment of Education Minister Nouria al-Subeih.

In the lead-up to the vote, Ashour, Ali Al-Daqbaashi, Musallam Al-Barrak and Hussein Muzyed spoke against the minister while Khalaf Al-Enezi, Ali Al-Rashid, Mohammed Al-Sager, and Adel Al-Saraawi spoke in her defense.

Subeih had to defend herself against allegations that she had attempted to deceive the nation when she denied a press report that three male students had been sexually assaulted by an Asian worker at a state school. She explained she had been misinformed and issued an apology.

Islamist lawmaker Saad al-Shreih also accused Subeih of not showing enough respect for Islam when she did not punish a 14-year-old girl who had allegedly drawn a cross on her religion text book and scribbled notes on it that she hated Islam. The minister told the house there was no evidence the girl had actually done that and so she was just referred to counseling. Shreih, however, still managed to gather the requisite signatures of ten lawmakers to force the no-confidence vote.

== Supporting women's rights reforms ==
On April 21, 2008, Ashour addressed a seminar on women's civil rights at Kuwait University. Ashour told the group that sharia discriminates between men and women only over a very few matters and that the Kuwaiti Constitution states that equity is a core pillar of society. Ashour blamed discrimination on habits and customs which have nothing to do with Islam. Ashour also hailed women's acquisition of political rights in Kuwait as a positive step.

On August 11, 2008, Ashour submitted a bill that called for granting children born to Kuwaiti mothers and non-Kuwaiti fathers the Kuwaiti citizenship. He stressed that Kuwaiti women should be treated equally with men, as the Kuwaiti law automatically grants citizenship to children born to Kuwaiti fathers.

== Philanthropy ==
Ashour is involved in a number of philanthropic projects, including establishing religious and community centres in the African continent, including the Ahl al-Bayt centre in Tanzania.
