= Kuwait's Fifth Constituency =

Constituency in Kuwait

Constituency Five
- Multi-member constituency for the National Assembly of Kuwait
- Electorate: 257,913

Current constituency
- Created: 2008
- Seats: 10

The fifth constituency of Kuwait is a legislative constituency in Kuwait. Like the other four constituencies in Kuwait, it elects exactly 10 members to the National Assembly via plurality vote. As of 2022, it currently represents thirty-one residential areas and has an electorate of 257,913 (the largest). The fifth constituency includes the Ahmadi and Mubarak Al-Kabeer governorates.

== Areas in Constituency Five ==
There are a total of 257913 voters (130185 female voters; 127728 male voters).

- Al-Ahmadi
- Hadiya
- Al-Fintas
- Al-Mahboula
- Abu Halifa
- Sabah Al-Salem
- Al-Riqqa
- Sabahiya
- Daher
- Egaila
- Al-Qurain
- Al-Adan
- Al-Qusour
- Mubarak Al-Kabeer
- Fahad Al-Ahmad
- Jaber Al-Ali
- Fahaheel
- Mangaf
- Ali Sabah Al-Salem
- Al-Zour
- Al-Wafra
- Abu Futaira
- Al-Masail
- Abu Al-Hasaniya
- Sabah Al-Ahmad City
- Khiran Residential City

== See also ==
- Constituencies of the National Assembly of Kuwait
- Demographics of Kuwait
