= February 2012 Kuwaiti general election =

General election in Kuwait

Early general elections were held in Kuwait on 2 February 2012, the country's second general election in a three-year period. The election's turnout rate was 59%. However, in June 2012 the Constitutional Court declared the elections invalid and reinstated the former parliament. The court said the dissolution of Parliament in December 2011 by Emir Sabah Al-Sabah was unconstitutional. In response, opposition MPs resigned from parliament and demanded a full parliamentary system.

After the dissolution of parliament, a new election was set for December 2012.

== Background ==
Emir Sabah Al-Sabah dissolved the National Assembly of Kuwait on 7 December 2011 citing "deteriorating conditions" amid an increasingly bitter political showdown over alleged high-level corruption. Major street demonstrations, some with crowds numbering in the tens of thousands, had been occurring with greater and greater frequency, forcing the resignation of the government for the second time in less than a year. A group of former government parliamentarians sued to reverse the dissolution, stating that the act was unconstitutional. In response the decree to set the date for the new election was delayed. The election was eventually set for 2 February.

== Campaign ==
While operating within the Constitution of Kuwait, opposition candidates are demanding significant reforms, including a constitutional monarchy. Shiite candidate and ex-MP Hussein al-Qallaf accused the opposition of wanting to share power with the ruling family, which he said would lead Kuwait into a state of chaos.

=== Candidates ===
There were 344 candidates, including 24 women, who ran in five constituencies with ten seats each.

== Opinion polls ==
According to some polls, the opposition may gain as many as 33 seats, up from the 20 seats they held before.

== Results ==
Liberal bloc won 9 seats. The opposition bloc won 34 out of 50 seats in the parliament. The opposition bloc is a loose coalition of liberals, Islamists, secular nationalists, populists, tribes, and some Shiite Islamists. Sunni Islamists and tribes combined won 23 seats.

Party	Votes	%	Seats
Shiite candidates			23
Pro-government candidates			14
Sunni candidates			7
Other opposition candidates			4
Independents			2
Total			50
Total votes	238,308	–	
Registered voters/turnout	400,296	59.53	
Source: IPU

The biggest margin of victory in each constituency was led by:

1. Faisal al-Duwaisan with 14,094 votes.
2. Jamaan al-Harbash (or Jama'an al-Hirbish) with 8,475 votes.
3. Faisal al-Mislem al-Otaibi with 16,383 votes.
4. Musallam al-Barrak.
5. Falah al-Sawwagh.

== Aftermath ==
Following the elections, Ahmed Al-Sadoun was elected Speaker, defeating Mohammed Al-Sager.

Candidate	Party	Votes	%
Ahmed Al-Sadoun	Popular Action Bloc	38	59.38
Mohammed Al-Sager	National Democratic Alliance	26	40.62
Total		64	100.00
Valid votes		64	98.46
Invalid/blank votes		1	1.54
Total votes		65	100.00
Registered voters/turnout		65	100.00
