= Kuwait's Fourth Constituency =

Constituency in Kuwait

Constituency Four
- Multi-member constituency for the National Assembly of Kuwait
- Electorate: 208,971

Current constituency
- Created: 2008
- Seats: 10

The fourth constituency of Kuwait is a legislative constituency in Kuwait. Like the other four constituencies in Kuwait, it elects exactly 10 members to the National Assembly via plurality vote. As of 2022, it currently represents twenty-seven residential areas and has an electorate of 208,971. The fourth constituency includes the Jahra and Farwaniya governorates.

== Areas in Constituency Four ==
There are a total of 208971 voters (108035 female voters; 100936 male voters).

- Farwaniya
- Al-Firdous
- Al-Omairiya
- Al-Rabiya
- Al-Riga’e
- Al-Andalus
- Jileeb Shyookh
- Sabah Al-Nasser
- Al-Shidadiya
- Al-Rehab
- Al-Ardiya
- Ishbilya
- Abdullah Al-Mubarak
- Al-Jahra
- Al-Sulaibiya
- Saad Al-Abdullah
- West Abdullah Al Mubarak
- South Abdullah Al Mubarak
- Oyoun
- Naeem
- Nasseem
- Qasr
- Taima
- Waha

== See also ==
- Constituencies of the National Assembly of Kuwait
- Demographics of Kuwait
