= National Assembly (Kuwait) =

Suspended unicameral legislature of Kuwait

National Assembly of Kuwait مجلس الأمة الكويتي Majlis al-ʾUmma al-Kuwaytiyy
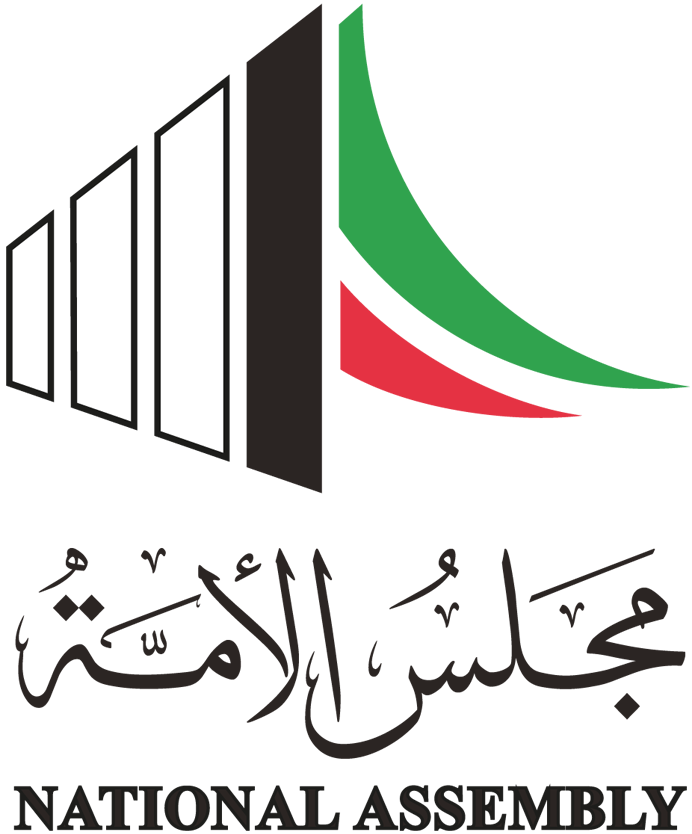
- Logo used to represent the National Assembly

Type
- Type: Unicameral
- Term limits: None

Leadership
- Emir of Kuwait: Mishal Al-Ahmad Al-Jaber Al-Sabah since 16 December 2023

Structure
- Seats: 50 elected members Up to 16 appointed members
- Length of term: Four years (currently suspended)

Elections
- Voting system: Single non-transferable vote
- Last election: April 4, 2024

Meeting place
- Kuwait National Assembly Building, Kuwait City, Kuwait; 29°22′13″N 47°57′50″E

Website
- kna.kw

The National Assembly (Arabic: مجلس الأمة, Majlis al-ʾUmma) is the unicameral legislature of Kuwait. It is typically composed of 50 elected members and 16 directly appointed government ministers (ex officio members).

The assembly has frequently been dissolved by the Emir of Kuwait. From 2006 to 2024, the assembly was dissolved 13 times. The assembly has been suspended since 10 May 2024 for a four-year constitutional re-evaluation due to frequent inaction, corruption, bribery, vote purchasing and political deadlock.

== Overview ==
The National Assembly is the legislature in Kuwait, established in 1963. Its predecessor, the 1938 National Assembly, was formally dissolved in 1939 after "one member, Sulaiman al-Adasani, in possession of a letter, signed by other Assembly members, addressed to Iraq's King Ghazi, requesting Kuwait's immediate incorporation into Iraq." This demand came after the merchant members of the Assembly attempted to extract oil money from Ahmad Al-Jaber Al-Sabah, a suggestion refused by him and upon which he instigated a crackdown which arrested the Assembly members in 1939.

The National Assembly normally consists of 65 members; this total includes 50 elected deputies as well as 15 cabinet members directly appointed by the Emir. Fifty deputies are elected by one non-transferable vote to serve four-year terms. Members of the cabinet also sit in the parliament as deputies. The constitution limits the size of the cabinet to 16. The cabinet ministers have the same rights as the elected MPs, with the following two exceptions: they do not participate in the work of committees, and they cannot vote when an interpolation leads to a no-confidence vote against one of the cabinet members. As per Article 107 of the Kuwait constitution, the assembly could be dissolved by the Emir by decree, giving the reasons for the dissolution. However, it could not be dissolved again on the same grounds, and elections for the new assembly must be held within a period not exceeding two months from the date of the dissolution.

In contrast to parliaments in other Gulf kingdoms, the assembly has considerably more formal and informal power.

The assembly was previously suspended from 1976–1981 and 1986–1991.

=== Gender balance ===
Kuwaiti women gained the right to vote in 2005. Women first won seats in the National Assembly in the 2009 election, in which four women, Aseel al-Awadhi, Rola Dashti, Massouma al-Mubarak and Salwa al-Jassar, were elected.

== Building ==
The parliament building was designed by Danish architect Jørn Utzon, who also designed the Sydney Opera House.

== Political factions ==
While political parties are illegal in Kuwait, a number of political factions exist. Prior to its suspension, the house was composed of different political factions:

- The liberal bloc.
- The Shaabi (populist) bloc: A coalition of populists, liberals and nationalist political organizations with a focus on middle-class issues. The Popular Action Bloc is their main political organization.
- The Islamist bloc: Consisting of Islamist members.

Kuwait's 2024 elections reportedly witnessed an increase in voter turnout.

== See also ==
- Politics of Kuwait
- Government of Kuwait
- Cabinet of Kuwait
- Elections in Kuwait
- List of speakers of Kuwait National Assembly
- Kuwait National Assembly No-Confidence Votes
- List of political parties in Kuwait
