= 2023 Kuwaiti National Assembly =

17th legislative session of Kuwait

17th Legislative Session الفصل التشريعي السابع عشر
←	2022 (annulled)	2024	→
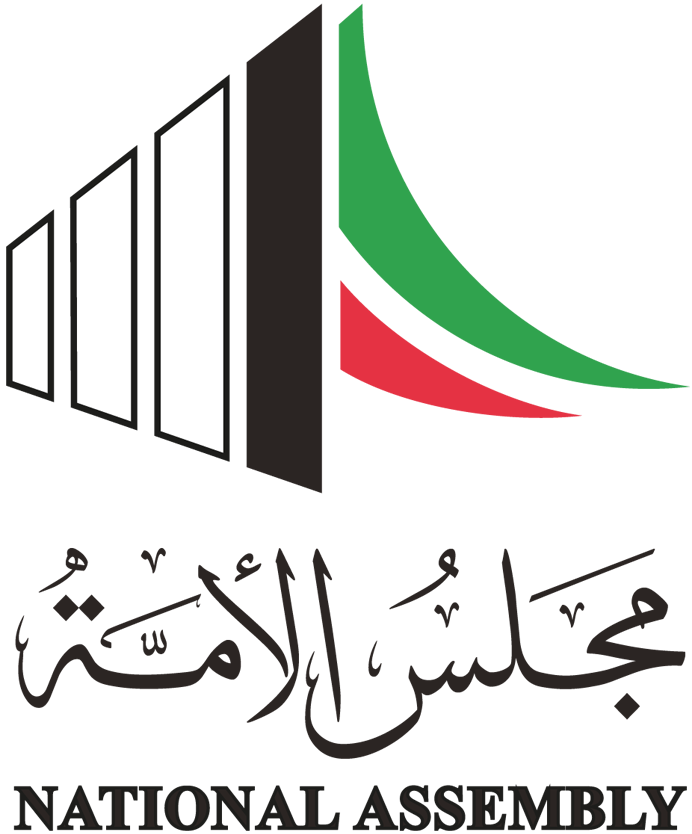

Overview
- Term: 20 June 2023 – 15 February 2024
- Speaker: Ahmed Al-Sadoun
- Deputy Speaker: Mohammed Al-Mutair
- Secretary: Mubarak Al-Tasha (1st session); Osama Al-Shaheen (2nd Session)
- Controller: Mohammed Al-Huwaila (1st session); Falah Al-Hajri (2nd session)

Cabinet of Kuwait
- Members: 16 ministers (including an elected MP)
- Prime Minister: Ahmad Al-Nawaf (20 June — 20 December 2023); Mohammad Sabah Al-Salem (4 January — 15 February 2024)
- Deputy Prime Minister: Talal Al-Khaled (20 June — 20 December 2023)

Sessions
- 1st: 20 June 2023 – 2 August 2023
- 2nd: 31 October 2023 – 15 February 2024

The 2023 Kuwaiti National Assembly (commonly known as Majlis 2023) was the 17th legislative session of the National Assembly. Members were elected on 6 June 2023. The session started on 20 June 2023. The session was dissolved on 15 February 2024 due to Abdulkarim Al-Kanderi allegedly insulting Emir Mishal Al-Ahmad.

== General elections ==
After the 2022 election results were annulled on 19 March, elections were held on 6 June 2023. 38 MPs kept their seats from the annulled 2022 parliament. The Opposition kept its majority in parliament, while only one woman was elected. The turnout was 59.27% of the 470,369 voters that cast their votes. Hadas and Salafis both won three seats, and the Shiite Taalof group won two seats. The 42 remaining seats were won by unaffiliated MPs. The rate of change in elected members was 24%, compared to the 2022 elections. On July 26, the constitutional court rejected all appeals regarding the electoral process and results confirming the legitimacy of the session and results.

== Members ==
=== Elected members ===
Constituency	Members
First Constituency	Abdullah Al-Mudhaf
First Constituency	Osama Al-Zaid
First Constituency	Ahmed Lari
First Constituency	Khaled Al-Ameera
First Constituency	Hassan Jawhar
First Constituency	Dawood Marafie
First Constituency	Essa Al-Kandari
First Constituency	Hamad Al-Midlij
First Constituency	Osama Al-Shaheen
First Constituency	Adel Al-Damkhi
Second Constituency	Marzouq Al-Ghanim
Second Constituency	Shuaib Shabaan
Second Constituency	Abdullah Al-Anbaie
Second Constituency	Falah Dhahi
Second Constituency	Mohammed Al-Mutair
Second Constituency	Abdulwahab Al-Essa
Second Constituency	Bader Nashmi
Second Constituency	Fahad Al-Masoud
Second Constituency	Hamad Al-Matar
Second Constituency	Bader Al-Mulla
Third Constituency	Muhalhal Al-Mudhaf
Third Constituency	Ahmed Al-Sadoun
Third Constituency	Abdulkarim Al-Kanderi
Third Constituency	Muhannad Al-Sayer
Third Constituency	Abdulaziz Al-Saqabi
Third Constituency	Jenan Boushehri
Third Constituency	Hamad Al-Obaid
Third Constituency	Fares Al-Otaibi
Third Constituency	Hamad Al-Olayan
Third Constituency	Jarrah Al-Fouzan
Fourth Constituency	Bader Sayyar
Fourth Constituency	Mubarak Al-Tasha
Fourth Constituency	Mutib Al-Thaydi
Fourth Constituency	Mohammad Al-Ruqaib
Fourth Constituency	Mohammed Hayef
Fourth Constituency	Mubarak Al-Hajraf
Fourth Constituency	Abdullah Fahaad
Fourth Constituency	Saad Al-Khanfour
Fourth Constituency	Fayez Al-Jamhour
Fourth Constituency	Shuaib Al-Muwaizri
Fifth Constituency	Saud Al-Asfoor
Fifth Constituency	Hamdan Al-Azmi
Fifth Constituency	Khaled Al-Munaes
Fifth Constituency	Hani Shams
Fifth Constituency	Marzouq Al-Hubaini
Fifth Constituency	Fahad bin Jamea
Fifth Constituency	Abdulhadi Al-Ajmi
Fifth Constituency	Mohammed Al-Mahhan
Fifth Constituency	Majed Mussaed
Fifth Constituency	Mohammed Al-Huwaila
Source: KUNA (1, 2, 3, 4, 5)

=== Appointed members ===
- 44th Cabinet of Kuwait (20 June 2023 — 20 December 2023)
- 45th Cabinet of Kuwait (17 January 2024 — 15 February 2024)

== Speaker and committees elections ==
The Speaker as well as his deputy, secretary, and controller were elected via direct vote from the MPs on the first session on 20 June 2023. Minister Essa Al-Kandari announced that the government will not vote on these elections.

=== Speaker election ===
Former Speaker Ahmed Al-Sadoun announced his intention to run for speaker elections on 7 June 2023. During the opening session, Ahmed Al-Sadoun and Dawood Marafie ran for the speaker position. Marafie withdrew against Al-Sadoun, later going unopposed.

=== Deputy speaker election ===
Mohammed Al-Mutair, deputy speaker of the annulled 2022 parliament, and Marzouq Al-Hubaini announced their intention to run for the deputy speaker position.

Candidate	Party	Votes	%
Mohammed Al-Mutair	Independent	32	69.57
Marzouq Al-Hubaini	Independent	14	30.43
Total		46	100.00
Valid votes		46	93.88
Invalid/blank votes		3	6.12
Total votes		49	100.00
Registered voters/turnout		65	75.38

Al-Mutair got 32 votes, while Al-Hubaini got 14. The sixteen government ministers did not vote.

=== Secretary and controller elections ===
Mubarak Al-Tasha won the secretary position unopposed. Mohammed Al-Huwaila won the controller position, but Hani Shams and Falah Dhahi withdrew.

=== Committees elections ===
Three permanent committees held elections which are the Education & Culture Committee, Health, Societal, & Labor Committee, and the Budgets Committee.

In the Education & Culture Committee election, Hamad Al-Matar got elected with 22 votes, Jenan Boushehri got 17 votes, Abdulhadi Al-Ahli got with 12 votes, Hamad Al-Olayan got 10 and Mohammed Al-Huwaila got 9 votes. Fahad bin Jamea withdrew.

In the Health, Societal & Labor Committee election, Bader Al-Enezi got elected with 22 votes, Hani Shams with 12 votes, Majed Masaed and Saad Al-Khanfour got 11 votes, Fahad bin Jamea got 9 votes. Fares Al-Otaibi withdrew.

In the Budgets Committee election, Abdulwahab Al-Essa got elected with 22 votes, Adel Al-Damkhi got 19 votes, Saud Al-Asfoor and Osama Al-Zaid got 17 votes, Hamad Al-Matar got 16 votes, and Fahad Al-Masoud got 14 votes. Bader Al-Mulla withdrew after getting 14 votes in the election.

== Leadership ==
Speaker

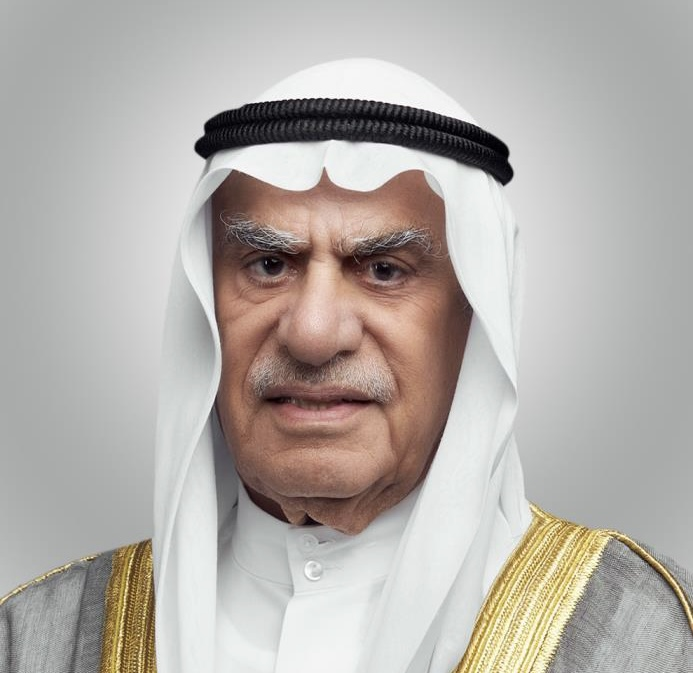
Ahmed Al-Sadoun

Prime Minister

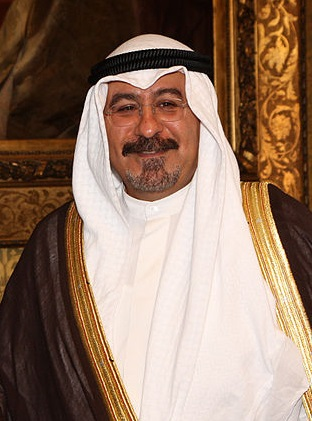
Mohammad Sabah Al-Salem

=== Council’s Office members ===
- Speaker: Ahmed Al-Sadoun
- Deputy Speaker: Mohammed Al-Mutair
- Secretary-General: Khaled Abu Salib

==== 1st session ====
- Secretary: Mubarak Al-Tasha
- Controller: Mohammed Al-Huwaila
- Legislative & Legal Committee President: Muhannad Al-Sayer
- Economic & Financial Committee President: Shuaib Al-Muwaizri
- Priorities Committee President: Abdullah Fahaad

==== 2nd session ====
- Secretary: Osama Al-Shaheen
- Controller: Falah Dhahi Al-Hajri
- Legislative & Legal Committee President: Muhannad Al-Sayer
- Economic & Financial Committee President: Shuaib Al-Muwaizri
- Priorities Committee President: Abdullah Fahaad

=== Government ===
==== 44th Government ====
- Prime Minister: Ahmad Al-Nawaf
- First Deputy Prime Minister: Talal Al-Khaled
- Deputies: Ahmad Al-Fahad, Essa Al-Kandari, and Saad Al-Barrak
- Secretary-General: Saleh Al-Mulla

==== 45th Government ====
- Prime Minister: Mohammad Sabah Al-Salem
- First Deputy Prime Minister: Vacant
- Deputies: Fahad Yusuf Al-Sabah, and Emad Al-Atiqi
- Secretary-General: Saleh Al-Mulla

== Committees ==
On June 20, 8 of 11 permanent committees got their seats unopposed.

- Petitions & Complaints Committee (Chair: Hamdan Al-Azmi)

Members: Mohammed Hayef, Khaled Al-Otaibi, Khaled Al-Tammar, Abdulhadi Al-Ajmi.

- Defense & Interior Committee (Chair: Khaled Al-Otaibi)

Members: Majed Masaed, Khaled Al-Tammar, Mohammed Al-Mahhan, Bader Al-Shammari.

- Economic & Financial Committee (Chair: Shuaib Al-Muwaizri)

Members: Bader Al-Mulla, Abdullah Fahaad, Abdulwahab Al-Essa, Abdullah Al-Anbaie, Dawood Marafie, Bader Al-Enezi.

- Legislative & Legal Committee (Chair: Muhannad Al-Sayer)

Members: Osama Al-Shaheen, Jarrah Al-Fouzan, Mubarak Al-Tasha, Jenan Boushehri, Abdulkarim Al-Kanderi, Abdulaziz Al-Saqabi.

- Education & Culture Committee (Chair: Hamad Al-Matar)

Members: Abdulhadi Al-Ajmi, Mohammed Al-Huwaila, Hamad Al-Olayan, Jenan Boushehri.

- Health, Societal, & Labor Committee (Chair: Saad Al-Khanfour)

Members: Majed Masaed, Hani Shams, Fahad bin Jamea, Bader Al-Enezi.

- Foreign Affairs Committee (Chair: Abdullah Al-Mudhaf)

Members: Marzouq Al-Hubaini, Shuaib Shabaan, Abdulkarim Al-Kanderi, Abdulaziz Al-Saqabi.

- Public Utilities Committee (Chair: Vacant)

Members: Mubarak Al-Hajraf, Dawood Marafie, Mohammed Al-Mahhan, Mohammed Al-Huwaila, Ahmed Lari, Fahad Al-Masoud, Fares Al-Otaibi.

- Budgets Committee (Chair: Adel Al-Damkhi)

Members: Hamad Al-Matar, Saud Al-Asfoor, Fahad Al-Masoud, Abdulwahab Al-Essa.

- Protection of Public Funds Committee (Chair: Muhalhal Al-Mudhaf)

Members: Hamad Al-Olayan, Jarrah Al-Fouzan, Mutib Al-Thaydi, Osama Al-Shaheen.

- Priorities Committee (Chair: Abdullah Fahaad)

Members: Muhammad Al-Sayer, Hamad Al-Obaid.

== Legislation ==
=== First Session ===
The first session ran from 20 June until 2 August 2023. On July 13, the government and parliament unanimously voted in favor of the new “Residential Cities” law. This law allowed private companies to develop new residential areas in Kuwait in order to solve the housing crisis. On July 14, parliament added housewives to the governmental Afiya medical insurance.

On August 1, parliament passed the “High Electoral Commission” law. The commission will organize future general elections. It also permitted members, including Musallam Al-Barrak and Bader Al-Dahoum, that were sentenced to jail in Amir-offending cases run in future elections. It also banned all political advertisements and rallies 24 hours before Election Day. It also stated that residents would vote in the constituency their Civil ID address is in. Finally, the commission must release the whole election result within ten days.

== Dissolution ==
On February 7, Abdulkarim Al-Kanderi pointed out differences between the Amiri speech during the opening of the second session and the Amiri speech of Mishal Al-Ahmad after he took oath. On February 13, parliament rejected the government and Al-Sadoun’s request to censor Al-Kanderi’s comments on February 7 by 44-16. On February 15, the government requested the dissolution of parliament after it considered Al-Kanderi’s comments as an insult towards the emir. Resulting in the dissolution of parliament by the emir on the same day of the request.
