= Kuwaiti political gridlock =

Political crisis in Kuwait

Kuwaiti political gridlock (2020–2024)
- Date: 15 December 2020 — 10 May 2024
- Location: Kuwait
- Cause: Rivalry for succession within the ruling Al Sabah dynasty.; Opposition politicians re-entering the electoral process in 2020, after having allegedly boycotted the elections in 2012 and 2013.; Demands for populist measures like wage and subsidy increases from elected MPs, set against a cabinet aiming for austerity and structural reforms.
- Outcome: Four year dissolution of parliament on 10 May 2024; Appointment of Crown Prince on 1 June 2024; Planned amendment of the Kuwait Constitution

The Kuwaiti political gridlock, which extended from 2020 to May 2024, was marked by a standoff between the appointed cabinet and the elected parliament in Kuwait. This crisis was set against a backdrop of successive internal succession crises within the ruling Al Sabah family, beginning with the death of Emir Sabah Al Ahmad in 2020. Leadership transitioned to his half-brother Nawaf, who died in 2023, subsequently elevating Mishal Al Sabah to the role of emir. Before June 1, 2024, Mishal, the last surviving member of his generation and a son of Ahmad Al Jaber Al-Sabah, had not appointed a successor.

Under the Kuwaiti Constitution, the emir appoints the prime minister, with members of the Al Sabah family traditionally holding key cabinet portfolios, including the prime ministership. Additionally, the emir appoints the crown prince, who must receive approval from at least 50% of the elected parliamentarians. This entrenched practice fueled the political stalemate, as next-generation succession candidates used populist strategies to gain parliamentary support for their bids for the emirate. Figures such as Sheikh Nasser Sabah Al-Ahmad and Sheikh Ahmad Al-Nawaf, both sons of former emirs, have used such strategies against their rivals during their fathers’ reigns to secure parliamentary backing in their pursuit of the emirate. These tactics frequently involved the selective prosecution of rivals on corruption charges, granting pardons for supporters, and sweeping personnel changes across government levels to forge alliances within both the ruling family and the parliament. Specifically, Nasser's efforts targeted Jaber Al-Mubararak during his term as Prime Minister, while Ahmad's strategies were directed against Sabah Al-Khaled when he held the prime ministership, with both targets also being potential candidates for the Crown Prince position due to their age, kinship, and previous experience as Prime Minister.

This crisis had significantly impacted Kuwait's political landscape, resulting in the appointment of four different prime ministers, the dissolution of parliament three times, the annulment of one parliamentary session, and the formation of ten different cabinets over three years.

The crisis concluded on May 10, 2024, when Emir Mishal Al Ahmad announced the dissolution of parliament for up to four years, the suspension of some constitutional articles, and introduced a plan to revise and amend the constitution to mitigate future political dysfunction. Subsequently, on June 1, 2024, Emir Mishal appointed Sheikh Sabah Al-Khalid Al-Hamad Al-Sabah as Crown Prince, definitively ending the political gridlock and feuding within the ruling family.

== Ruling family succession feud ==
Article 4 of the Kuwaiti Constitution mandates that the nomination of a crown prince by the emir must receive approval from over 50% of the parliament, a requirement that has brought internal disputes into the public and parliamentary sphere, moving beyond mere palace intrigue. Kuwaiti political scientist Mohammed Alwuhaib contends that members of the Al Sabah family have engaged in the manipulation of political and economic factions to undermine one another, with rival sheikhs frequently employing accusations of corruption as a strategy.

=== Nasser Al-Mohammed and Ahmad Al-Fahad feud ===
Beginning in late 2010, parliamentarians supportive of Prime Minister Sheikh Nasser Al-Mohamed initiated criticisms against Sheikh Ahmad Al Fahad. In November of that year, MP Adel Al-Saraawi charged Sheikh Ahmad in the Kuwaiti parliament with creating an unauthorized, shadow government within Kuwait. The situation was intensified by the appointment of his brother, Sheikh Athbi Al-Fahad Al-Sabah, as the head of the Kuwait State Security apparatus, suggesting Sheikh Ahmad had influence beyond his designated governmental duties. By March 2011, MPs Marzouq Al-Ghanim and Adel Al-Saraawi proposed an inquiry into Sheikh Ahmad, at that time the deputy prime minister, concerning alleged mismanagement of government contracts. These developments resulted in Sheikh Ahmad's resignation from his government positions by June 2011.

In August 2011, allies of Ahmad Al-Fahad unearthed documents implicating as many as one-third of the members of parliament in what swiftly emerged as the most significant political corruption scandal in Kuwait's history. By October of the same year, allegations had surfaced against 16 MPs, accusing them of accepting payments totaling $350 million in exchange for their backing of government policies.

Also in October 2011, MP Musallam Al-Barrack, an ally of Ahmad Al-Fahad, claimed that significant sums of Kuwaiti dinars had been funneled from Kuwait's Ministry of Foreign Affairs to the foreign bank accounts of Prime Minister Nasser Al-Mohammed. This accusation prompted the resignation of the Foreign Minister, Dr. Mohammed Al-Sabah, the last representative of the Al-Salem branch within the Sabah family, as a form of protest. Nasser Al-Mohammed refuted these claims, asserting that "all transfers were conducted in the interests of Kuwait without any personal gain." He was later cleared of these allegations by a special judicial tribunal in Kuwait.

=== Resignation of Nasser Al-Mohammed and Appointment of Jaber Al-Mubarak as Prime Minister ===
Large-scale political demonstrations in November 2011 prompted Emir Sabah Al-Ahmad Al-Jaber Al-Sabah to accept the resignation of Nasser Al-Mohammed on November 28, 2011. Following this, he appointed the then-outgoing Defense Minister, Sheikh Jaber Al-Mubarak, as Prime Minister.

==== Fake Coup video and Ahmad Al-Fahad fraud conviction ====
In December 2013, supporters of Ahmad Al-Fahad asserted they had tapes allegedly showing Nasser Al-Mohammed and former Parliament Speaker Jassem Al-Kharafi planning to overthrow the Kuwaiti government. This incident came to be known as the Kuwait Complaint (Arabic: بلاغ الكويت). Ahmad Al-Fahad discussed these allegations on Al-Watan TV.

In response to these allegations, the Kuwaiti public prosecutor initiated an investigation in April 2014, enforcing a comprehensive media blackout to prevent any discussion or reporting on the matter. To persuade the public prosecutor of the tapes' authenticity, Ahmad Al-Fahad and his associates orchestrated a fake legal confrontation in Switzerland. This involved backdating documents and using a Delaware-based shell company they controlled. This sham arbitration, later exposed as fraudulent in Swiss courts, was submitted to the High Court in London to assist in validating the tapes.

By March 2015, the Kuwaiti public prosecutor had ceased all inquiries into the alleged coup attempt, and Ahmad Al-Fahad publicly withdrew his accusations on Kuwait state television. Simultaneously, Athbi Al-Fahad, Ahmad's brother and former head of state security, along with associates known as the "Fintas Group," embarked on a campaign of disinformation. They produced and circulated a low-quality video falsely showing the head of the constitutional court accepting a bribe, suggesting this influenced the public prosecutor's decision to halt the investigation. Subsequently, Athbi Al-Fahad and the Fintas Group members were legally prosecuted and found guilty for their involvement in these acts.

In November 2018, Ahmed and four co-defendants were charged in Switzerland with forgery connected to their involvement in fabricating an arbitration in Switzerland to validate their spurious video alleging a coup plot. This action followed a criminal complaint filed by the legal representatives of Nasser Al-Mohammad and Jassem Al-Kharafi.

Sheikh Ahmed was convicted of forgery on September 10, 2021, alongside the four other individuals involved, receiving a sentence of 30 months in prison, with half of the sentence suspended.

=== Appointment of Sabah Al-Khaled as Prime Minister ===
In November 2019, Sheikh Khaled Al Jarrah Al Sabah, the former Deputy Prime Minister and Minister of Interior of Kuwait, was removed from his position following allegations by Nasser Sabah Al-Ahmad Al-Sabah, the Minister of Defense. The allegations were presented to the Kuwaiti Attorney General, accusing the Prime Minister Sheikh Jaber Al-Mubarak and the Defense Minister Sheikh Khaled of embezzling 240 million Kuwaiti dinars (approximately $794.5 million) from government funds during his tenure as Minister of Defense. Sheikh Jaber Al Mubarak resigned as Prime Minister, but upon reappointment by the emir, he declined the position, stating his desire to first clear his name in court. Following this, Emir Sabah appointed the then-outgoing Foreign Minister, Sheikh Sabah Al-Khaled, as Prime Minister.

== Parliamentary politics ==
=== Modification of the electoral system and opposition boycott ===
On 21 June 2012, the Constitutional Court annulled the opposition-majority parliamentary session elected in February 2012. Subsequently, Emir Sabah Al-Ahmad issued a decree modifying the voting system for Kuwaiti citizens from four non-transferable votes to a single non-transferable vote. This adjustment led to the opposition boycotting the December 2012 and 2013 parliamentary elections.

=== Populist opposition to economic reform ===
Under the speakership of Marzouq Al-Ghanim, the 14th and 15th sessions passed some unpopular laws. In June 2016, parliament passed a lèse-majesté law that banned citizens who defamed the dignity of the emir from running in elections. This law disqualified multiple opposition members like Musallam Al-Barrak and Bader Al-Dahoum from running for office. In August 2016, as part of economic reforms aimed at countering falling oil revenues, parliament approved a bill that increased heavily subsidised gasoline prices, some of the lowest globally, by 40-80%. This marked the first time gas prices were raised in 50 years.

=== Sabah Al-Khaled Premiership (December 2020 to June 2022) ===
In the December 2020 parliamentary election, two-thirds of the incumbents lost their seats. On December 11, 40 MPs jointly announced their intention to vote for Bader Al-Humaidi to replace Marzouq Al-Ghanim as speaker of parliament.

==== Al-Khalid’s government elects Al-Ghanim ====
On December 15, 2020, during the opening session of parliament, Marzouq Al-Ghanim was elected as speaker with 33 votes, including 16 from cabinet members, outvoting Al-Humaidi who received 28 votes. Al-Ghanim's election led to discontent between some elected MPs leading to a request to interpolate Al-Khalid as head of government. The interpolation was requested by MPs Al-Dahoum, Al-Suwait, and Al-Otaibi. Al-Suwait stated that Sabah Al-Khalid put forward his interests instead of the interests of the people, and 31 MPs supported the interpolation. On 18 January 2021, Sabah Al-Khalid's government resigned after staying in office for one month and four days.

==== The Opposition rejects to cooperate with Al-Khalid ====
On 2 March 2021, Al-Khalid formed a new cabinet. Later that month, on March 31, Al-Khalid's government was sworn in during a session that was boycotted by opposition members, resulting in the attendance of only 33 members, including Al-Khalid and his 16 ministers, out of a total of 65. During this session, Al-Khalid requested a postponement of all his current and future interrogations until after the conclusion of the second parliamentary session, a request that was approved by the attending MPs. Additionally, the session included the declaration of the vacancy of Bader Al-Dahoum's parliamentary seat, which was the primary reason for the opposition's boycott.

On 13 April 2021, opposition members introduced a motion to cancel the postponement of Al-Khalid's interrogations. The motion was defeated by 33 of the 60 attending members. Chaos ensued during the vote as opposition members protested the rejection at the podium. Mohammed Al-Mutair escalated the situation by using a megaphone to shout, “This request shouldn’t pass!” while Saleh Al-Shallahi attempted to take a polling paper from the secretary-general. On April 28, opposition members occupied the government ministers’ designated seats in parliament, demanding that Al-Khalid appear at the “interpolation podium.” This led the government to boycott and subsequently abandon the session. The opposition continued this tactic on May 25, maintaining their sit-in on the government seats, which prolonged the government's boycott.

==== Al-Wasmi succeeds Al-Dahoum ====
On 8 June 2014, Bader Al-Dahoum was sentenced to one year and eight months in jail after insulting the emir Sabah Al-Ahmad. After Al-Dahoum was voted into office, the validity of candidacy was questioned by the Constitutional Court. On the 15 March 2021, the constitutional court annulled Al-Dahoum's candidacy after he violated the candidacy laws passed two years after his speech.

On 23 April 2021, Obaid Al-Wasmi announced that he was going to run a by-election for Al-Dahoum's vacated seat. Multiple opposition MPs welcomed Al-Wasmi's announcement including Abdulkarim Al-Kanderi, Marzouq Al-Khalifa, and Bader Al-Dahoum himself. In the by-election held on May 21, Obaid Al-Wasmi got a historic 93% of the total votes amounting to 43,810 votes. Obaid's number of votes broke Musallam Al-Barrak's number in the February 2012 election of 31,263 votes. However, this comparison is not entirely equivalent, as Obaid participated in a by-election for a single seat, while Al-Barrak competed in a general election.

==== Kuwaiti National Dialogue ====
Thirteen days before the opening of the second session on 26 October 2021, Emir Nawaf Al-Ahmad invited opposition members and the government into a national dialogue in hopes that both branches would cooperate in the next session. On 8 October, the emir pardoned multiple opposition members who resided in Türkiye. Musllam Al-Barrak, Salem Al-Namlan, Jamaan Al-Harbash, Faisal Al-Muslim, and others were all part of the emir's pardon list. Controversially, the pardon also included twenty Kuwaiti citizens who were part of the Abdali Terrorist Cell (A “cell” affiliated with Hezbollah that stored weapons in the town of Abdali) case. On 24 October, Marzouq Al-Ghanim and Sabah Al-Khalid were appointed to a committee for future Amiri Pardons.

On 28 December 2021, as part of the National Dialogue, Prime Minister Sabah Al-Khalid announced the inclusion of several Members of Parliament in his new cabinet. The MPs appointed to the 39th cabinet included Essa Al-Kandari, Mohammed Al-Rajhi, Hamad Rouheddine, and Mubarak Al-Arou. The dialogue created a lasting division among opposition members, with some, such as Mohammed Al-Mutair, rejecting cooperation with Speaker Marzouq Al-Ghanim, while others, like Obaid Al-Wasmi, participated in the dialogue efforts.

==== Al-Khalid’s fourth resignation ====
During the National Dialogue, the decision to postpone all interrogations of Prime Minister Sabah Al-Khalid was reversed. On 29 March 2022, MPs Muhannad Al-Sayer, Muhalhal Al-Mudhaf, and Hassan Jawhar submitted a request to interpolate Prime Minister Sabah Al-Khalid. This interrogation escalated into the threat of a no-confidence vote, which was supported by 26 MPs and resulted in Al-Khalid's resignation on 5 April 2022. His government lasted for 99 days before Nawaf Al-Ahmad accepted his resignation on 10 May 2022.

==== 2022 MP Sit-in and parliament dissolution ====
In protest against Al-Khalid's delay in forming his government, on 15 June 2022, 17 members of parliament organized an overnight sit-in at their parliament offices. The participating MPs demanded the restoration of political life in Kuwait, which they argued had been disrupted during Sabah Al-Khalid's tenure as prime minister.

On 22 June, Crown Prince Mishal Al-Ahmad announced his intention to dissolve parliament after rising tensions between both sides. This ended the sit-in on the same day.

=== Ahmad Al-Nawaf Premiership (July 2022 - December 2023) ===
On 24 July 2022, an Amiri decree issued by the Crown Prince, acting on behalf of the Emir, appointed the Emir's eldest son Sheikh Ahmad Nawaf Al-Ahmad Al-Sabah as Kuwait's Prime Minister. On 28 August, the Kuwaiti Cabinet led by Ahmad Nawaf Al-Sabah approved the decree calling for elections on 29 September.
