= 2024 Kuwaiti National Assembly =

18th legislative session of Kuwait

18th Legislative Session الفصل التشريعي الثامن عشر
←	2023	2028	→
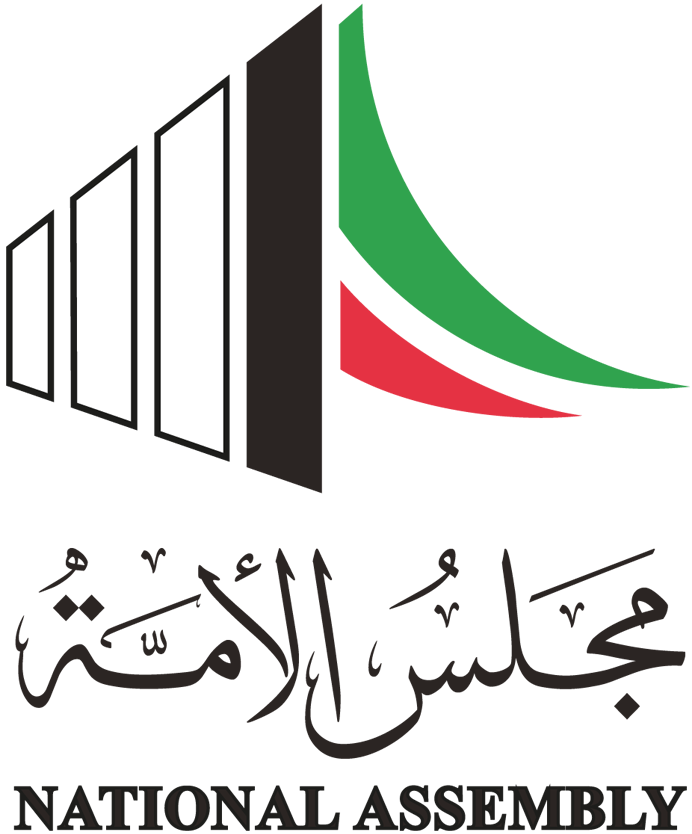

Overview
- Term: 17 April 2024 – 10 May 2024
- Speaker: Vacant
- Deputy Speaker: Vacant
- Secretary: Vacant
- Controller: Vacant

Cabinet of Kuwait
- Members: 16 ministers (including an elected MP)
- Prime Minister: Vacant
- 1st Deputy Prime Minister: Vacant

Sessions
- 1st: 17 April 2024 – 10 May 2024

The 2024 Kuwaiti National Assembly (commonly known as Majlis 2024) is the 18th legislative session of the National Assembly. Members were elected on April 4, 2024, and the first session was held on April 17, 2024. On May 10, 2024, Emir Sheikh Mishal Al Ahmed Al Jaber Al Sabah dissolved the parliament and suspended certain articles of the Kuwaiti constitution for an indefinite period not exceeding four years.

== Members ==
=== Elected members ===
Constituency	Members
First Constituency	Osama Al-Zaid
First Constituency	Abdullah Al-Mudhaf
First Constituency	Mohammed Johar Hayat
First Constituency	Ahmed Lari
First Constituency	Essa Al-Kandari
First Constituency	Basel Al-Bahrani
First Constituency	Adel Al-Damkhi
First Constituency	Khaled Al-Ameera
First Constituency	Saleh Ashour
First Constituency	Mohammed Al-Dahoum
Second Constituency	Marzouq Al-Ghanim
Second Constituency	Shuaib Shabaan
Second Constituency	Abdulwahab Al-Essa
Second Constituency	Falah Dhahi
Second Constituency	Mohammed Al-Mutair
Second Constituency	Bader Nashmi
Second Constituency	Nawaf Al-Azmi
Second Constituency	Abdullah Al-Anbaie
Second Constituency	Bader Al-Mulla
Second Constituency	Fahad Al-Masoud
Third Constituency	Abdulkarim Al-Kanderi
Third Constituency	Abdulaziz Al-Saqabi
Third Constituency	Muhalhal Al-Mudhaf
Third Constituency	Muhannad Al-Sayer
Third Constituency	Fares Al-Otaibi
Third Constituency	Jarrah Al-Fouzan
Third Constituency	Muhannad Al-Sayer
Third Constituency	Ahmed Al-Fhadhel
Third Constituency	Jenan Boushehri
Third Constituency	Hamad Al-Obaid
Fourth Constituency	Shuaib Al-Muwaizri
Fourth Constituency	Anwar Al-Ficker
Fourth Constituency	Obaid Al-Wasmi
Fourth Constituency	Mohammad Al-Ruqaib
Fourth Constituency	Mubarak Al-Tasha
Fourth Constituency	Bader Sayyar
Fourth Constituency	Saad Al-Khanfour
Fourth Constituency	Fayez Al-Jamhour
Fourth Constituency	Mubarak Al-Hajraf
Fourth Constituency	Mohammed Hayef
Fifth Constituency	Fahad Falah Al-Azmi
Fifth Constituency	Hamdan Al-Azmi
Fifth Constituency	Mutib Al-Sahali
Fifth Constituency	Saud Al-Asfoor
Fifth Constituency	Bader Al-Dahoum
Fifth Constituency	Majed Musaed
Fifth Constituency	Abdulhadi Al-Ajmi
Fifth Constituency	Hani Shams
Fifth Constituency	Mohammed Al-Dossari
Fifth Constituency	Khaled Al-Munaes
Source: KUNA
