= 44th Cabinet of Kuwait =

Chief executive body of the state of Kuwait

The Cabinet of Kuwait is the chief executive body of the State of Kuwait. The 44th cabinet in the history of Kuwait was appointed on 18 June 2023. On 13 June 2023, Amir of Kuwait His Highness Sheikh Nawaf Al-Ahmad Al-Jaber Al-Sabah assigned His Highness Sheikh Ahmad Nawaf Al-Ahmad Al-Sabah as Prime Minister . The Amir has also assigned the Prime Minister to refer the cabinet line-up for their appointment. On 18 June 2023, the new cabinet line up was announced after the Amir approved in an Amiri order. On 12 July 2023, the Crown Prince accepted the resignation of the Finance Minister. On 18 July 2023, the Crown Prince accepted the resignation of the Minister of Education. On 3 September 2023, the Minister of Finance and Minister of Education were appointed. On 30 October 2023, a decree was issued accepting the resignation of Minister of Public Works and another assigning the Minister of Electricity, Water and Renewable Energy as the acting Minister of Public Works. On 20 December 2023, the Prime Minister Sheikh Ahmad Nawaf Al-Ahmad Al-Sabah tendered a letter of government resignation to the newly succeeded Emir Sheikh Mishal Al-Ahmad Al-Jaber Al-Sabah. The government will function as care-taker until the formation of the new government.

| Incumbent | Office | Website | Since |
|---|---|---|---|
| Ahmad Nawaf Al-Ahmad Al-Sabah | Prime Minister | pm.gov.kw | 13 June 2023 – 20 December 2023 |
| Talal Khaled Al-Ahmad Al-Sabah | First Deputy Prime Minister, Minister of Interior | moi.gov.kw | 18 June 2023 – 20 December 2023 |
| Ahmad Al-Fahad Al-Ahmed Al-Sabah | Deputy Prime Minister and Minister of Defense | mod.gov.kw | 18 June 2023 – 20 December 2023 |
| Essa Ahmad Al-Kandari | Deputy Prime Minister, Minister of State for Cabinet Affairs and Minister of State for National Assembly Affairs | mona.gov.kw | 18 June 2023 – 20 December 2023 |
| Dr. Saad Hamad Nasser Al-Barrak | Deputy Prime Minister and Minister of Oil and Minister of State for Economic and Investment Affairs | moo.gov.kw | 18 June 2023 – 20 December 2023 |
| Fahad Ali Al-Shu'la | Minister of State for Municipal Affairs and Minister of State for Communication and Information Technology | www.baladia.gov.kw moc.gov.kw | 18 June 2023 – 20 December 2023 |
| Abdulrahman Badah Al Mutairi | Minister of Information and Minister of Awqaf (Endowment) and Islamic Affairs | media.gov.kw www.awqaf.gov.kw | 18 June 2023 – 20 December 2023 |
| Dr. Ahmad Abdulwahab Al-Awadhi | Minister of Health | www.moh.gov.kw | 18 June 2023 – 20 December 2023 |
| Dr. Amani Sulaiman Buqamaz | Minister of Public Works | www.mpw.gov.kw | 18 June 2023 – 30 October 2023 |
| Dr. Jassem Muhammad Abdullah Al-Ostad (Acting) | Minister of Public Works | www.mpw.gov.kw | 30 October 2023 - 20 December 2023 |
| Dr. Hamad Abdulwahab Hamad Al-Adwani | Minister of Education, Minister of Higher Education and Scientific Research | moe.edu.kw | 18 June 2023 – 18 July 2023 |
| Dr. Jassem Muhammad Abdullah Al-Ostad (Acting) | Minister of Education, Minister of Higher Education and Scientific Research | moe.edu.kw | 18 July 2023 - 3 September 2023 |
| Dr. Adel Al-Manea | Minister of Education, Minister of Higher Education and Scientific Research | moe.edu.kw | 3 September 2023 - 20 December 2023 |
| Salem Abdullah Al-Jaber Al-Sabah | Minister of Foreign Affairs | www.mofa.gov.kw | 18 June 2023 – 20 December 2023 |
| Mohammad Othman Al-Eyban | Minister of Commerce and Industry, Minister of State for Youth Affairs | moci.gov.kw youth.gov.kw | 18 June 2023 – 20 December 2023 |
| Manaf Abdulaziz Al-Hajeri | Minister of Finance | mof.gov.kw | 18 June 2023 – 12 July 2023 |
| Dr. Saad Hamad Nasser Al-Barrak (Acting) | Minister of Finance | mof.gov.kw | 12 July 2023 - 3 September 2023 |
| Fahad Al-Jarallah | Minister of Finance | mof.gov.kw | 3 September 2023 - 20 December 2023 |
| Dr. Jassem Muhammad Abdullah Al-Ostad | Minister of Electricity, Water and Renewable Energy | mew.gov.kw | 18 June 2023 – 20 December 2023 |
| Faleh Abdullah Eid Faleh Al-Roqba | Minister of Justice and Minister of State for Housing Affairs | moj.gov.kw www.pahw.gov.kw | 18 June 2023 – 20 December 2023 |
| Feras Saud Al-Malek Al-Sabah | Minister of Social Affairs, Family and Childhood Affairs | www.mosa.gov.kw | 18 June 2023 – 20 December 2023 |
