= List of deputy speakers of Kuwait National Assembly =

Deputy Speaker of the National Assembly
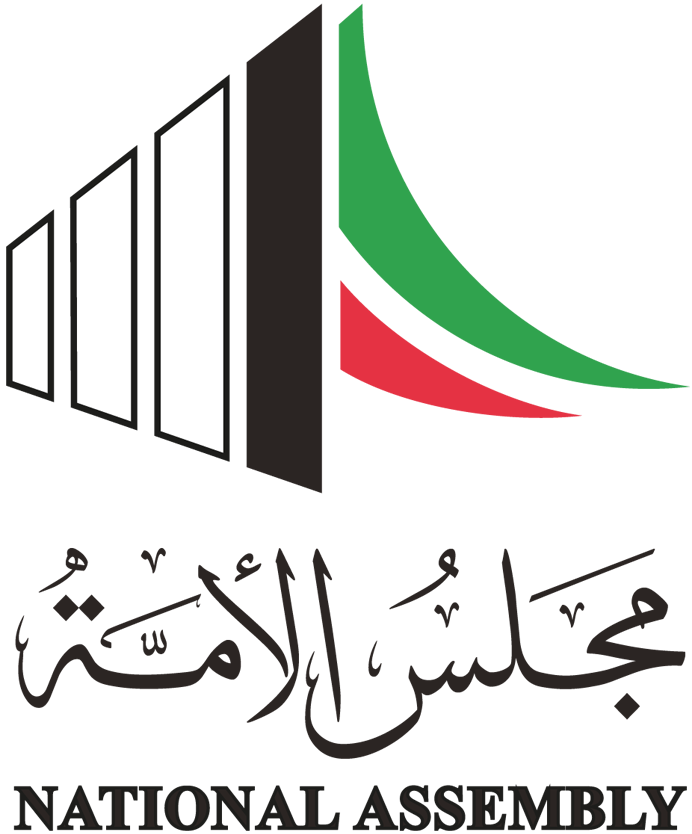
- Logo of the National Assembly

- Flag of Kuwait

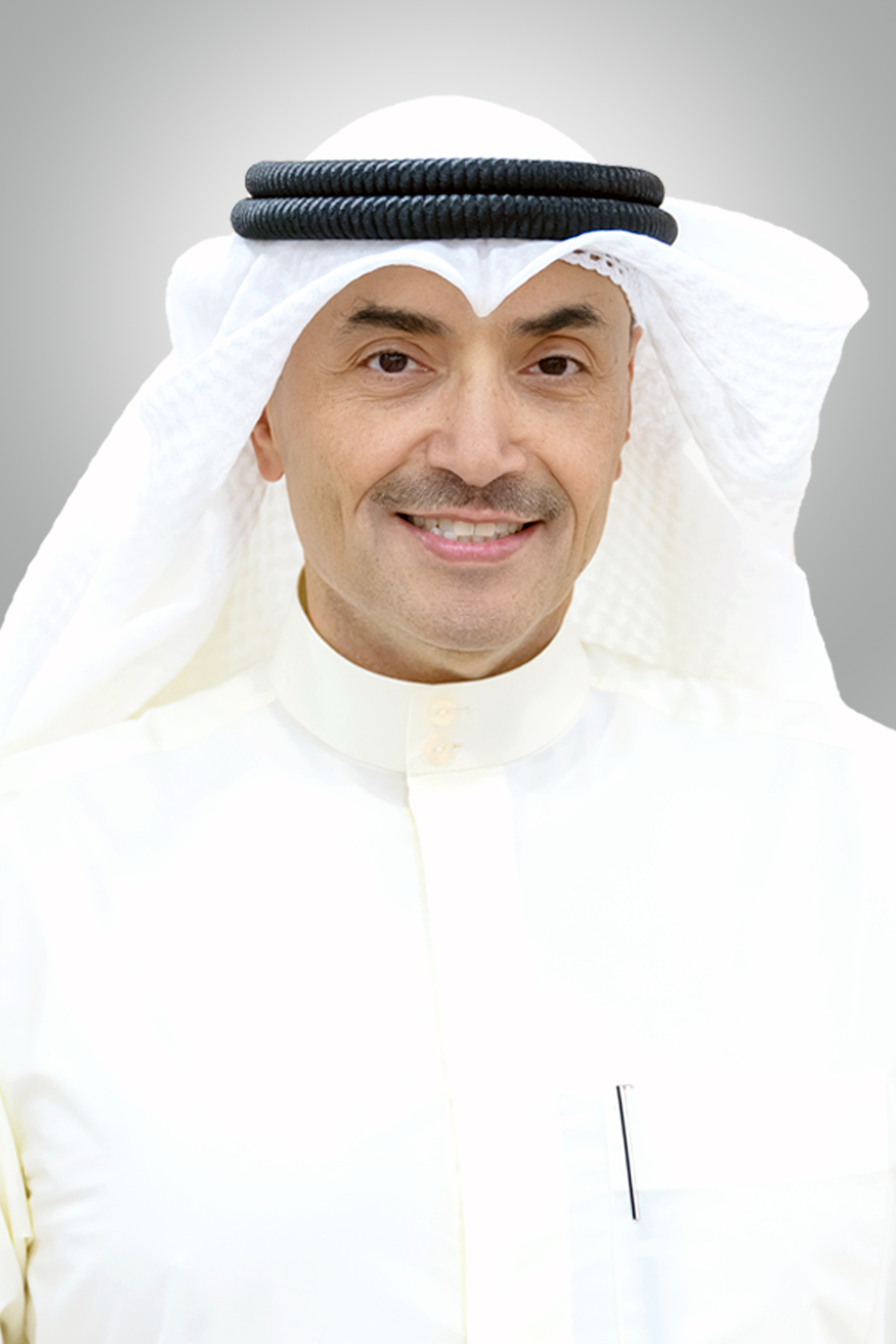
- Incumbent; Mohammed Al-Mutair since 20 June, 2023
- Kuwaiti National Assembly; Deputy Speaker's Office
- Member of: National Assembly Speaker’s Office
- Nominator: Majority of the 65 voting members of the National Assembly
- Appointer: The National Assembly
- Term length: None
- Formation: 1963
- First holder: Saud Al-Abdulrazzaq

Deputy Speaker of the National Assembly of Kuwait is deputy of the presiding officer of the National Assembly of Kuwait. Mohammed Al-Mutair is the current deputy speaker of the 17th session since 20 June 2023.

== List ==
Legislative Session	Election date	Name	Took office	Left office	Notes	Emir
1	23 Jan 1963	Saud Al-Abdulrazzaq	29 January 1963	5 January 1965		Abdullah Al-Salim
1	23 Jan 1963	Ahmed Al-Sarhan	5 January 1965	29 January 1967		Sabah Al-Salim
2	25 Jan 1967	Khalid Al-Ghunaim	7 February 1967	7 February 1971		Sabah Al-Salim
3	23 Jan 1971	Yousef Al-Mekhled	10 February 1971	10 February 1975		Sabah Al-Salim
4	27 Jan 1975	Ahmed Al-Sadoun	11 February 1975	29 August 1976		Sabah Al-Salim
The National Assembly was dissolved from 1976–1981.						Sabah Al-Salim (1976–77), Jaber Al-Ahmad (1977-81)
5	23 Feb 1981	Ahmed Al-Sadoun	9 March 1981	9 March 1985		Jaber Al-Ahmad
6	21 Feb 1985	Saleh Al-Fadhala	9 March 1985	3 July 1986		Jaber Al-Ahmad
The National Assembly was dissolved from 1986–1992. (Note: On July 3, 1986, the Emir suspended the Constitution and dissolved the National Assembly indefinitely. During Iraq's occupation of Kuwait and under intense international pressure, the Emir pledged to revive the National Assembly after Kuwait was liberated. As a result, Kuwait held a legislative election on October 5, 1992.)						Jaber Al-Ahmad
7	20 Oct 1992	Saleh Al-Fadhala	20 October 1992	20 October 1996		Jaber Al-Ahmad
8	23 Oct 1996	Talal Al-Ayyar	20 October 1996	4 May 1999		Jaber Al-Ahmad
9	4 July 1999	Meshari Al-Anjari	17 July 1999	17 July 2003		Jaber Al-Ahmad
10	5 July 2003	Meshari Al-Anjari	19 July 2003	21 May 2006		Jaber Al-Ahmad (2003–06); Sabah Al-Ahmad (2006)
11	29 June 2006	Mohammed Al-Busairi	12 July 2006	19 March 2008		Sabah Al-Ahmad
12	17 May 2008	Fahad Al-Meea	1 July 2008	17 March 2009		Sabah Al-Ahmad
13	16 May 2009	Abdullah Al-Roumi	1 June 2009	6 December 2012		Sabah Al-Ahmad
14 (Note: On June 20, 2012, the Constitutional Court annulled the February 2012 legislative election and reinstated the National Assembly elected in 2009, of which al-Kharafi was Speaker.)	2 Feb 2012	Khaled Sultan	15 February 2012	20 June 2012	Annulled by constitutional court	Sabah Al-Ahmad
14 (Note: In June 2013, the Constitutional Court annulled December 2012 legislative election and ordered the holding of fresh elections.)	1 Dec 2012	Mubarak Al-Khurainej	16 December 2012	16 June 2013	Annulled by constitutional court	Sabah Al-Ahmad
14	27 July 2013	Mubarak Al-Khurainej	6 August 2013	16 October 2016		Sabah Al-Ahmad
15	26 Nov 2016	Essa Al-Kandari	11 December 2016	11 December 2020		Sabah Al-Ahmad
16	5 Dec 2020	Ahmed Al-Shuhomi	15 December 2020	1 May 2023		Nawaf Al-Ahmad
17 (Note: In March 2023, the Constitutional Court annulled 2022 legislative election and ordered the holding of fresh elections.)	29 Sep 2022	Mohammed Al-Mutair	18 Oct 2022	19 Mar 2023	Annulled by Constitutional Court	Nawaf Al-Ahmad
17	20 June 2023	Mohammed Al-Mutair	20 June 2023	present		Nawaf Al-Ahmad (2023); Mishal Al-Ahmad (2023–)
