= 39th Cabinet of Kuwait =

Chief executive body of the state of Kuwait

The Cabinet of Kuwait is the chief executive body of the State of Kuwait. The 39th cabinet in the history of Kuwait was appointed on 28 December 2021. On 23 November 2021, Amir of Kuwait His Highness Sheikh Nawaf Al-Ahmad Al-Jaber Al-Sabah assigned His Highness Sheikh Sabah Al-Khaled Al-Hamad Al-Sabah as Prime Minister . The Amir has also assigned the Prime Minister to refer the cabinet line-up for their appointment. On 28 December 2021, the new cabinet line up was announced after the Amir approved in an Amiri order. On 17 February 2022, Amir of Kuwait accepted the resignations of the Minister of Defense & Minister of Interior. On 9 March 2022, an Amiri Decree has been issued appointing the interior minister and defense minister. On 22 March 2022, cabinet reshuffle took place, with the 3 existing minister being reassigned portfolios. On 5 April 2022, the Prime Minister tendered a letter of governmental resignation to the Crown Prince. On 10 May 2022, the Emir accepted the government resignation. The government will function as care-taker until the formation of the new government.

Incumbent	Office	Website	Since
Sabah Al-Khaled Al-Hamad Al-Sabah	Prime Minister	www.pm.gov.kw	28 December 2021 – 10 May 2022
Hamad Jaber Al-Ali Al-Sabah	Deputy Prime Minister and Minister of Defense	www.mod.gov.kw	28 December 2021 – 16 February 2022
Dr. Ahmad Nasser Al-Mohammad Al-Sabah (Acting)	Minister of Defense	www.mod.gov.kw	17 February 2022 – 8 March 2022
Talal Khaled Al-Ahmad Al-Sabah	Deputy Prime Minister and Minister of Defense	www.mod.gov.kw	9 March 2022 – 10 May 2022
Dr. Mohammad Abdullatif Al-Fares	Deputy Prime Minister and Minister of Electricity, Water and Renewable Energy	www.mew.gov.kw	28 December 2021 – 21 March 2022
Ali Hussein Al-Mousa	Minister of Electricity, Water and Renewable Energy	www.mew.gov.kw	22 March 2022 – 10 May 2022
Ahmad Mansour Al-Ahmad Al-Sabah	Deputy Prime Minister and Minister of Interior	www.moi.gov.kw	28 December 2021 – 16 February 2022
Dr. Mohammad Abdullatif Al-Fares (Acting)	Deputy Prime Minister and Minister of Interior	www.moi.gov.kw	17 February 2022 – 8 March 2022
Ahmad Nawaf Al-Ahmad Al-Sabah	First Deputy Prime Minister and Minister of Interior	www.moi.gov.kw	9 March 2022 – 10 May 2022
Dr. Mohammad Abdullatif Al-Fares	Deputy Prime Minister and Minister of Oil	www.moo.gov.kw	28 December 2021 – 10 May 2022
Issa Ahmad Mohammad Hassan Al-Kandari	Minister of Awqaf (Endowment) and Islamic Affairs	www.islam.gov.kw	28 December 2021 – 10 May 2022
Fahad Mutlaq Al-Shurai'an	Minister of Commerce and Industry	www.moci.gov.kw	28 December 2021 – 10 May 2022
Dr. Ali Fahad Al-Mudhaf	Minister of Education	www.moe.edu.kw	28 December 2021 – 10 May 2022
Dr. Abdulwahab Mohammad Al-Rushaid	Minister of Finance	www.mof.gov.kw	28 December 2021 – 10 May 2022
Dr. Ahmad Nasser Al-Mohammad Al-Sabah	Minister of Foreign Affairs	www.mofa.gov.kw	28 December 2021 – 10 May 2022
Dr. Khaled Mhawes Al-Saeed	Minister of Health	www.moh.gov.kw	28 December 2021 – 10 May 2022
Dr. Ali Fahad Al-Mudhaf	Minister of Higher Education and Scientific Research	www.mohe.edu.kw	28 December 2021 – 10 May 2022
Justice Jamal Hadhel Al-Jalwai	Minister of Justice	www.moj.gov.kw	28 December 2021 – 10 May 2022
Dr. Hamad Ahmad Rouhaddeen	Minister of Information and Culture	media.gov.kw	28 December 2021 – 10 May 2022
Ali Hussein Al-Mousa	Minister of Public Works	www.mpw.gov.kw	28 December 2021 – 10 May 2022
Mubarak Zaid Al-Mutairi	Minister of Social Affairs and Community Development	www.mosa.gov.kw	28 December 2021 – 10 May 2022
Dr. Ahmad Nasser Al-Mohammad Al-Sabah	Deputy Prime Minister and Minister of State for Cabinet Affairs	www.cmgs.gov.kw	28 December 2021 – 21 March 2022
Dr. Mohammad Abdullatif Al-Fares	Minister of State for Cabinet Affairs	www.cmgs.gov.kw	22 March 2022 - 10 May 2022
Dr. Rana Abdullah Al-Fares	Minister of State for Communication and Information Technology	moc.gov.kw	28 December 2021 – 10 May 2022
Dr. Abdulwahab Mohammad Al-Rushaid	Minister of State for Economic and Investment Affairs		28 December 2021 – 10 May 2022
Mubarak Zaid Al-Mutairi	Minister of State for Housing Affairs and Urban Development	www.pahw.gov.kw	28 December 2021 – 10 May 2022
Dr. Rana Abdullah Al-Fares	Minister of State for Municipal Affairs	www.baladia.gov.kw	28 December 2021 – 10 May 2022
Mohammad Obaid Al-Rajhi	Minister of State for National Assembly Affairs	www.mona.gov.kw	28 December 2021 – 10 May 2022
Justice Jamal Hadhel Al-Jalwai	Minister of State for Nazaha (Integrity) Enhancement	www.nazaha.gov.kw	28 December 2021 – 10 May 2022
Ali Hussein Al-Mousa; Mohammad Obaid Al-Rajhi	Minister of State for Youth Affairs	www.youth.gov.kw	28 December 2021 – 10 May 2022

== See also ==
- Cabinet of Kuwait
