= 41st Cabinet of Kuwait =

Chief executive body of the state of Kuwait

The Cabinet of Kuwait is the chief executive body of the State of Kuwait. The 41st cabinet in the history of Kuwait was appointed on 5 October 2022. On 5 October 2022, Amir of Kuwait His Highness Sheikh Nawaf Al-Ahmad Al-Jaber Al-Sabah assigned His Highness Sheikh Ahmad Nawaf Al-Ahmad Al-Sabah as Prime Minister. The Amir has also assigned the Prime Minister to refer the cabinet line-up for their appointment. On 5 October 2022, the new cabinet line up was announced after the Amir approved in an Amiri order. Due to strong backlash from MPs and citizens about some of the recurring ministers returning, on 6 October 2022, the Prime Minister tendered a letter of governmental resignation to the Crown Prince a day after its formation, making it the shortest-lived government in Kuwaiti history. The Prime Minister then met with MPs to take their ideas about the government's new formation in order to ease tensions between the government and parliament.

Incumbent	Office	Website	Since
Ahmad Nawaf Al-Ahmad Al-Sabah	Prime Minister	pm.gov.kw	5 October 2022 – 6 October 2022
Talal Khaled Al-Ahmad Al-Sabah	First Deputy Prime Minister, Minister of Interior	moi.gov.kw	5 October 2022 – 6 October 2022
Dr. Mohammad Abdullatif Al-Fares	Deputy Prime Minister and Minister of State for Cabinet Affairs		5 October 2022 – 6 October 2022
Dr. Ahmad Nasser Al-Mohammad Al-Sabah	Minister of Foreign Affairs	www.mofa.gov.kw	5 October 2022 – 6 October 2022
Dr. Rana Abdullah Al-Fares	Minister of State for Municipal Affairs and Minister of State for Communication and Information Technology	www.baladia.gov.kw moc.gov.kw	5 October 2022 – 6 October 2022
Abdulrahman Badah Al Mutairi	Minister of Information and Minister of State for Youth Affairs	media.gov.kw youth.gov.kw	5 October 2022 – 6 October 2022
Dr. Abdulwahab Mohammad Al-Rushaid	Minister of Finance and Minister of State for Economic and Investment Affairs	mof.gov.kw	5 October 2022 – 6 October 2022
Dr. Ahmad Abdulwahab Al-Awadhi	Minister of Health	www.moh.gov.kw	5 October 2022 – 6 October 2022
Hussein Ismail Mohammad Ismail	Minister of Oil	moo.gov.kw	5 October 2022 – 6 October 2022
Dr. Khalifah Al-Humaidah	Minister of State of National Assembly Affairs and Minister of State for Housing and Urban Development.	mona.gov.kw www.pahw.gov.kw	5 October 2022 – 6 October 2022
Abdullah Ali Abdullah Al-Salem Al-Sabah	Minister of Defense	mod.gov.kw	5 October 2022 – 6 October 2022
Ammar Mohammad Al-Ajmi	Minister of Public Works and Minister of Electricity, Water and Renewable Energy	www.mpw.gov.kw mew.gov.kw	5 October 2022 – 6 October 2022
Mazen Saad Al-Nahidh	Minister of Commerce and Industry	moci.gov.kw	5 October 2022 – 6 October 2022
Muthana Talib Sayyed Abdulrahman Al-Refaei	Minister of Education and Minister of Higher Education and Scientific Research	moe.edu.kw	5 October 2022 – 6 October 2022
Dr. Mohammad Bu Zubar	Minister of Justice, Minister of Awqaf (Endowment) and Islamic Affairs and Minister of State for Nazaha (Integrity) Enhancement	moj.gov.kw www.awqaf.gov.kw www.nazaha.gov.kw	5 October 2022 – 6 October 2022
Advisor Huda Abdulmohsen Al-Shaiji	Minister of Social Justice and Societal Development and Minister of State for Women and Childhood Affairs	www.mosa.gov.kw	5 October 2022 – 6 October 2022
