= Burning of Al Juwahil headquarters =

Burning of the Juwahil Headquarters
- Part of Kuwaiti protests (2011–2012)
- Date: 2012
- Location: Adailiya, Kuwait
- Methods: Arson, protest
- Result: Significant damage to the headquarters; One person wounded; Several arrests made; Legal action taken against protesters; Ongoing public discourse about tribal identity and political tensions in Kuwait

Parties
Obaid Al-Wasmi supporters; Mutayr tribe; Bedouin Kuwaitis	Mohammad Al-Juwahil supporters	Kuwaiti police

Casualties and losses
7 protesters arrested	1 wounded	

The Burning of the Juwahil Headquarters refers to an incident in 2012, when protests erupted in Adailiya, Kuwait, in response to incendiary remarks made by candidate Muhammad Al-Juwahil against candidate Obaid Al-Wasmi. The protests escalated into violence, leading to the burning of his campaign headquarters by a group largely consisting of members from the Mutayr tribe, who felt insulted by his comments.

On the day of the protest, large groups of Mutayr tribe members gathered outside Al-Juwahil's headquarters in Adailiya. Tensions escalated, and some protesters set fire to the building, destroying it and its contents. The phrase "Shabbat al-Nar" (meaning "the fire has ignited") became a rallying cry for those involved in the attack. Despite efforts by security forces to contain the situation, the fire caused significant damage.

== See also ==
- Politics of Kuwait
