= Saad Al Barrak =

Kuwaiti businessman

Saad Al-Barrak
- سعد البراك
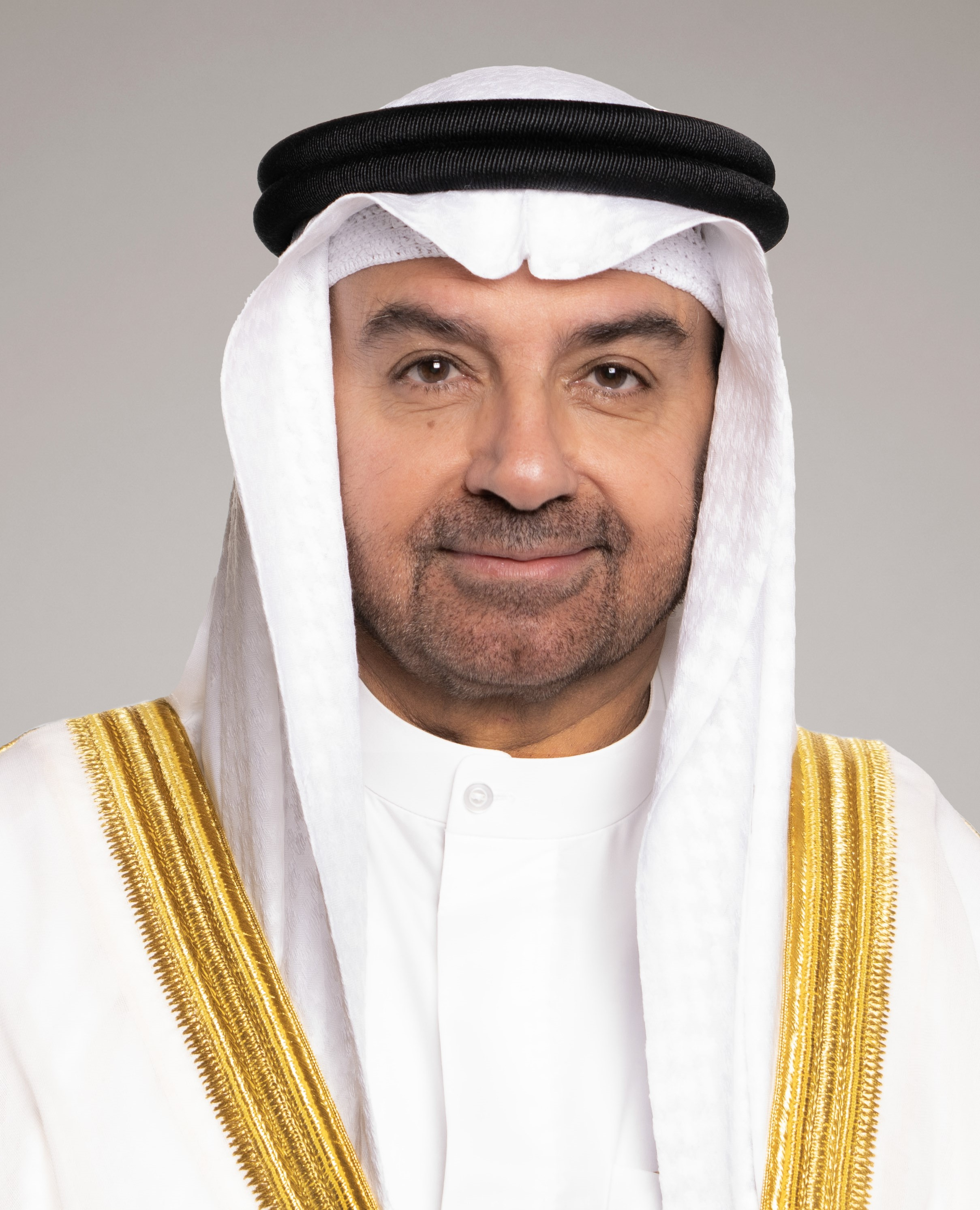
- Official Portrait, 2023

Deputy Prime Minister
- In office June 18, 2023 – Early 2024
- Monarchs: Nawaf Al-Ahmad Al-Sabah; Mishal Al-Ahmad Al-Sabah
- Prime Minister: Ahmad Al-Nawaf

Minister of Oil
- In office June 18, 2023 – Early 2024
- Preceded by: Bader Al-Mulla

Minister of State for Economic & Investment Affairs
- Incumbent
- Assumed office June 18, 2023
- Preceded by: Manaf Al-Hajeri

Personal details
- Born: 5 September 1955 (age 71)
- Citizenship: Kuwait
- Education: Georgetown University, Ohio University, Harvard Business School, University of London
- Occupation: Businessman, Engineer

Saad Al-Barrak is a Kuwaiti businessman, entrepreneur, and investor.He served as Deputy Prime Minister, Minister of Oil and Minister of State for Economic & Investment Affairs. Al-Barrak's career started as an engineer at International Turnkey Solutions where he was promoted to CEO after a five year tenure. Al-Barrak grew ITS through his novel method of management which turned the organization from a local player to a regional IT powerhouse. Al-Barrak is best known for his role as CEO of Zain Group where he turned Zain (formerly known as MTC) from a local telecom company with 500,000 users to a global network with 72 million users. Al-Barrak's leadership and expertise in change management was the element to Zain's success. The methodology of management that Al-Barrak brought in was the catalyst to making Zain Group into one of the largest telecom companies geographically.

== Early life and education ==
Dr. Saad Al-Barrak was born in the Farwaniyah District of Kuwait in the year 1955, the seventh of eleven brothers and five sisters, the son of Hamad Al-Barrak. Dr. Saad Al-Barrak lived closely to his father who was a renowned noble man that grew up in Sharq, Kuwait. Hamad Al-Barrak lost his father Nasser Al-Barrak during his childhood as he died at sea as a pearl diver and was buried in Sri Lanka. Hamad Al-Barrak's two paternal uncles were killed in the battle of Al-Sareef. Evidently Hamad Al-Barrak and his mother lived with his maternal uncles. Growing up in Sharq, Hamad Al-Barrak was known as an honest and religious man who was the treasurer of the pearl merchant Hilal Al-Mutairi. The bond between Hamad and Hilal was one built on trust and love for one another. During the reign of Mubarak Al-Kabeer, Hamad Al-Barrak was one of the messengers that telegraphed The Emir's letter of apology for the merchants that migrated to Bahrain. Dr. Saad Al-Barrak emphasizes that the 16 years he lived with his father have built his character and values.

Al-Barrak comes from a conservative household that values the religion of Islam. Al-Barrak attended at Mubarakiyah school where he excelled as a student. Al-Barrak was a star gymnast at Kazma club and won numerous local titles through his adolescent years. Al-Barrak was granted a scholarship for excelling in secondary school and decided to continue his education in The United States of America alongside a cohort of bright students. Al-Barrak started at Georgetown University in Washington D.C. where he undertook an intensive English course for a year. Al-Barrak went to Ohio University afterward to study electrical engineering. Al-Barrak took a hiatus after graduating with a bachelors degree and returned with his wife in 1979 where they stayed until 1982. Al-Barrak lived in Athens, Ohio for 7 years and had his first born son, Hamad, in 1981.

Al-Barrak continued his education at his alma mater and graduated with an MSc in industrial engineering. His extraordinary experiences shaped his mantra that incorporates eastern and western elements. Living in The United States at that time was supplemental to Al-Barrak's understanding of global economics that was a catalyst for his interest in technology. Al-Barrak was a politically active student during his education. Al-Barrak was involved and promoted the voice of Muslims and Arabs and rallied for the freedom of Palestine and The Arab world throughout his time as a scholar. Al-Barrak's education, with his background as a Kuwaiti Muslim that grew up in a transformative period for the world, shaped him for his roles later on.

== Career ==
Al Barrak started his career with a short stint at Kuwait Prefab Industries, during a short break in between his Bachelors and master's degrees. After completion of his master's degree, he taught at the Kuwait Institute of Applied Technology as a part of the conditions of the government scholarship that he was given. Upon being persuaded by an old friend, he joined ITS as a project engineer. Within a year, he was put in charge of Project teams and sent on training courses to the UK and US. By the end of 1985 he was appointed as Systems Development Manager and in (months after that was promoted to Assistant Director General for Sales and Systems support. In 1987, he was appointed CEO of ITS, barely 4 years after he had joined them as a Project Engineer. Al Barrak, resigned as CEO in 2001 and continued as managing director until 2002. Mobile Telecommunications Co. (MTC) had just been divested by the government and been taken over by the Al Kharafi Group, and Al Barrak became managing director of MTC which later re-branded as Zain Group in 2002 until he resigned in February 2010. He started ILA, an advisory firm in December 2010. Al Barrak was appointed Deputy Prime Minister, Oil Minister, and Minister of State for Economic and Investment Affairs, on 18 June 2023.

== Awards ==
- 2003 - E-businessman of the year, Arabian Business e-achievement award
- 2007 - Lifetime achievement award, Comms MEA
- 2008 - Arab Ad man of the year, Arab Ad
- 2008 - International Investor award, Africa Investor
- 2008 - Telecom CEO of the year, CEO Middle East
- 2008 - Visionary award, Bespoke
- 2009 - Editor's Award for Individual Contribution to the telecoms industry, Global Telecoms Business
- 2012 - Kuwaiti Business Man of the year, Arabian Business
- 2012 - Outstanding contribution to Business, CEO Middle East

== Bibliography ==
- Al Barrak, Saad (February 2012). A Passion for Adventure-turning Zain into a telecom Giant. Bloomsbury Qatar Foundation Publishing. ISBN 978-99921-94-88-1.
