= Bader Al-Mulla =

Kuwaiti politician (born 1971)

- بدر الملا

Member of National Assembly of Kuwait
- Incumbent
- Assumed office March 16, 2019
- Constituency: Second District

Deputy Prime Minister
- In office October 16, 2022 – May 8, 2023
- Monarch: Nawaf Al-Ahmad Al-Sabah
- Prime Minister: Ahmad Al-Nawaf

Minister of Oil
- In office October 16, 2022 – May 8, 2023
- Preceded by: Mohammed Al-Fares
- Succeeded by: Saad Al-Barrak

Minister of National Assembly Affairs
- In office April 9, 2022 – May 8, 2023
- Preceded by: Ammar Al-Ajmi
- Succeeded by: Essa Al-Kandari

Personal details
- Born: April 3, 1971 (age 55)
- Citizenship: Kuwait
- Occupation: Professor — Politician

Bader Hamed Al-Mulla is a law professor at Kuwait University and politician who is currently serving as a member of National Assembly since 2019. He also served as minister from 2022 until 2023. Holding multiple ministerial positions including deputy prime minister and Minister of Oil & National Assembly Affairs.

== Education & Early Career ==
Bader Al-Mulla was born on April 3, 1971, in Kuwait. He got a bachelor's degree on Police Sciences in 1996. He went on later to study law getting his Bachelor's on 2000. Bader got his master's on private law in 2005 and his doctorate on civil law in 2010. He later went on to work as a law professor on Kuwait University. In 2012, he authored a book on ”The legal system of financial markets”.

== Political career ==
Bader Al-Mulla first ran in 2016 election to get a seat in parliament. He got 845 votes in the Second District leading him to the 20th place. He ran again in the 2019 by-election after the constitutional court ruled that Jamaan Al-Harbash’s seat in parliament was deemed vacant. He won that seat getting 4657 votes. In the 2020 election, he got 8th place with almost 2500 votes getting him a seat in parliament. He gained a historic 7285 votes in the 2022 election leading him to first place.

On 16 October 2022, he was appointed in the 41st Cabinet of Kuwait as Deputy Prime Minister and Minister of Oil. On 9 April 2023, he got reappointed as Minister in the 42nd Cabinet of Kuwait adding the position of Ministry of National Assembly Affairs in his portfolio. He barely retained his seat in 2023 election getting 2360 votes in tenth place. He won the 2024 election, getting 2,758 votes in ninth place.

=== Election results ===
Year	Votes polled
2016	845 (L)
2019 (by-election)	4,657 (W)
2020	2,483 (W)
2022	7,285 (W)
2023	2,360 (W)
2024	2,758 (W)
