= List of international emiri trips made by Mishal Al-Ahmad =

Visits to foreign countries by the 17th Kuwaiti Emir

This is a list of international emiri trips made by Mishal Al-Ahmad Al-Jaber Al-Sabah, the 17th and current emir of Kuwait. Mishal Al-Ahmad has made thirteen international trips to ten nations since his reign started on 16 December 2023.

== Summary ==
The number of visits per country where Sheikh Mishal traveled are:

- One: Egypt, France, Jordan, Qatar, Turkey, United Arab Emirates and the United Kingdom
- Two: Bahrain, Oman and Saudi Arabia

== 2024 ==
#	Country	Areas visited	Dates	Details
1	Saudi Arabia	Riyadh	30 January	State visit, met with King Salman and Crown Prince Mohammed bin Salman
2	Oman	Muscat, Duqm	6–7 February	State visit and attending the opening ceremony of the joint Kuwaiti-Omani operated Duqm Refinery
3	Bahrain	Manama	13 February	State visit, met with King Hamad bin Isa Al Khalifa
4	Qatar	Doha	20 February	State visit, met with Sheikh Tamim bin Hamad Al Thani
5	United Arab Emirates	Abu Dhabi	5 March	State visit, met with Sheikh Mohamed bin Zayed Al Nahyan
6	Jordan	Amman	23–24 April	State visit, met with King Abdullah
7	Saudi Arabia	Riyadh	28 April	Attending the World Economic Forum special meeting on collaboration, growth and energy for development as head of the Kuwaiti delegation. Met with Iraqi Prime Minister Mohammed Shia' Al Sudani and Pakistani Prime Minister Shehbaz Sharif.
8	Egypt	Cairo	30 April — 1 May	State visit, met with President Abdel Fattah el-Sisi
9	Turkey	Ankara	7—8 May	State visit coinciding with the 60th anniversary of bilateral relations between the two nations. Met with President Recep Tayyip Erdoğan

== 2025 ==
#	Country	Areas visited	Dates	Details
10	United Kingdom	Ayrshire	14–15 January	Met with King Charles III in response to his invitation.
11	France	Paris	13–14 July	Official visit coinciding with the Bastille Day Parade. Met with President Emmanuel Macron.
12	Oman	Seeb	14 October	Private visit, met with Sultan Haitham bin Tariq.
13	Bahrain	Manama	3 December	Attending the 46th Gulf Cooperation Council Summit as head of the Kuwaiti delegation.
