= Abdullah Muhammad Al-Saleh =

London-based Kuwaiti journalist and activist

- عبدالله محمد عبدالله الصالح
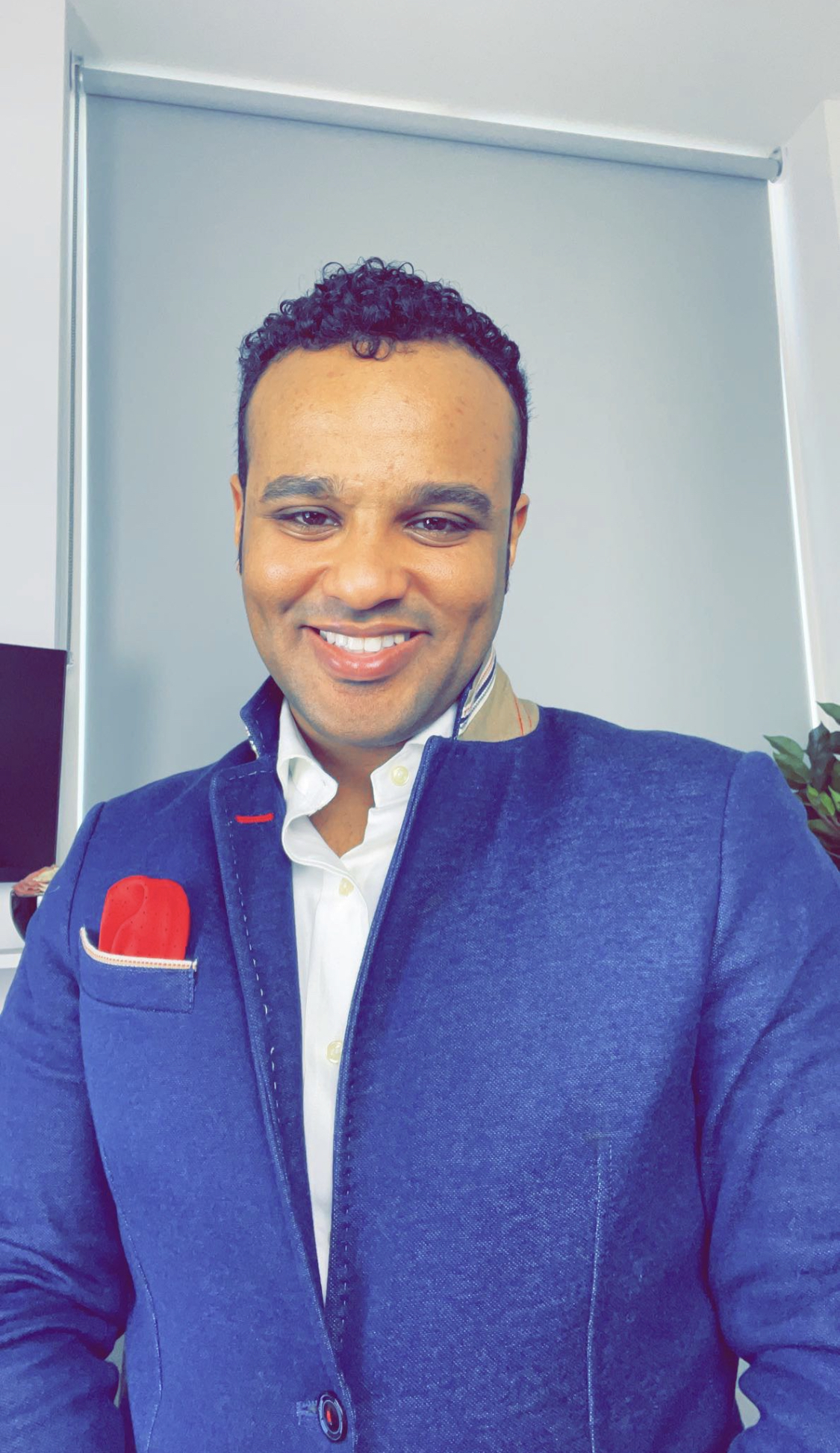
- Born: May 8, 1985 (age 41); Kuwait City
- Education: Kuwait University (Bsc Businesses Administration and Marketing); London South Bank University (Msc, PhD Economic Development)
- Occupation: YouTuber

Abdullah Muhammad Al-Saleh (Arabic: عبدالله محمد عبدالله الصالح) is a Kuwaiti YouTuber and self-proclaimed activist. He resides in London as a political refugee, having faced imprisonment in Kuwait due to his criticism of the Gulf states, including Kuwait, Saudi Arabia, the United Arab Emirates, Bahrain, and Oman.

== Education ==
Al-Saleh studied at Kuwait English School from 1988 to 2001 and graduated IGCSE. He earned Bachelor's degree in Business administration and Marketing at the college of Business Administration in Kuwait University from 2001 to 2005 and Master's degree in Development studies at London South Bank University from 2009 to 2010.

He earned a PhD in Economic Development at London South Bank University from 2011 to 2015.

== Career ==
Al-Saleh started his career as a marketing officer at Al Imtiaz Investment group in 2005, he then worked as a marketing and VIP clients officer at ADEEM Investment and Wealth Management Company in 2007. He then also worked as a VIP clients manager Al Najat Society from 2007 to 2009.

He also worked as a journalist for several magazines and newspapers in Kuwait including Al Anba newspaper, Al Watan newspaper, and Al Jarida newspaper.

Al-Saleh also runs a political YouTube show that exposes corruption in the Gulf States.

Al-Saleh has been interviewed by various media TV channels and newspapers including BBC Arabic, Alarabiya and AlJazeera. He was a member of the National Union of Kuwaiti Students from 2004 to 2005.

=== Refugee status ===
Al-Saleh received a total of 54-years of prison sentences for criticizing the leaders and governments of Kuwait, Saudi Arabia, the United Arab Emirates, Bahrain, and Oman. He fled to the UK and sought asylum in December 2017, a request that Amnesty International supported. By March 18, 2020, he was officially recognized as a political refugee. The US Department of State's report on Kuwait's Human Rights has noted his case.

In 2021, Al-Saleh stirred controversy in Kuwait by leaking what he claimed was a phone conversation with Kuwait's Deputy of Royal Protocol, Mohammad Al-Abdullah Al-Mubarak Al-Sabah. That same year, he also reported harassment by a member of the Royal family, Mubarak Al-Abdullah Al-Mubarak Al-Sabah.
