= Mohammed Al-Huwaila =

Member of the National Assembly of Kuwait

Mohammed Hadi Al-Huwaila
- محمد هادي الحويله

Member of the Kuwait National Assembly
- Incumbent
- Assumed office July 27, 2013
- In office May 17, 2008 – October 7, 2012

Personal details
- Born: April 7, 1971 (age 55) Kuwait City, Kuwait
- Occupation: Politician, assistant professor.

Mohammed Hadi Al-Huwaila Al-Ajmi (Arabic: محمد هادي الحويله) (born 1971) is a member of the Kuwaiti National Assembly, representing the fifth district. He is also the current controller of the National Assembly. Al-Huwaila obtained a PhD in management from Yarmouk University in Jordan. Al-Huwaila is an unaffiliated deputy.

== Personal life ==
Mohammed Al-Huwaila is the son of former National Assembly member Hadi Al-Huwaila. He is a member of the Ajman tribe.

== Political career ==
Al-Huwaila worked as an assistant professor before being elected for the first time into the National Assembly in 2008. After that he was elected into office multiple times in 2009, 2013, 2016, 2020, 2022, & 2023. On 20 June 2023, Al-Huwaila won the seat of controller in the National Assembly unopposed.

=== Results ===
Year	Votes polled
2008	13,271 (W)
2009	13,331 (W)
2012 (Feb)	7,487 (L)
2013	2,139 (W)
2016	2,851 (W)
2020	4,720 (W)
2022	6,765 (W)
2023	6,188 (W)
