= Essa Al-Kandari =

Politician in Kuwait

- عيسى الكندري

Member of National Assembly of Kuwait
- Incumbent
- Assumed office August 6, 2013
- Constituency: First District

Deputy Prime Minister
- Incumbent
- Assumed office June 18, 2023
- Monarchs: Nawaf Al-Ahmad Al-Sabah; Mishal Al-Ahmad Al-Sabah
- Prime Minister: Ahmad Al-Nawaf

Minister of National Assembly Affairs
- Incumbent
- Assumed office June 18, 2023
- Preceded by: Bader Al-Mulla
- In office August 1, 2022 – August 29, 2022
- Preceded by: Mohammed Al-Rajhi
- Succeeded by: Ammar Al-Ajmi

Minister of Cabinet Affairs
- Incumbent
- Assumed office June 18, 2023
- Preceded by: Khalid Al-Fadel

Deputy Speaker of the National Assembly
- In office December 11, 2016 – December 11, 2020
- Preceded by: Mubarak Al-Khuranij
- Succeeded by: Ahmad Al-Shohmi

Minister of State of Housing Affairs
- In office August 1, 2022 – August 29, 2022
- Preceded by: Mohammed Al-Rajhi
- Succeeded by: Ammar Al-Ajmi

Minister of Awqaf & Islamic Affairs
- In office December 14, 2020 – August 1, 2022
- Preceded by: Fahad Al-Afasi
- Succeeded by: Jamal Al-Jallawi

Minister of Social Affairs
- In office December 14, 2020 – March 2, 2021
- Preceded by: Mariam Al-Aqeel
- Succeeded by: Mashaan Al-Otaibi

Minister of Communications
- In office August 8, 2013 – October 16, 2016
- Preceded by: Salem Al-Athena
- Succeeded by: Mohammed Al-Jabri

Minister of the Municipality
- In office January 5, 2014 – October 16, 2016
- Preceded by: Salem Al-Athena
- Succeeded by: Mohammed Al-Jabri

Personal details
- Born: February 10, 1963 (age 63)
- Citizenship: Kuwait
- Occupation: Politician

Essa Ahmad Al-Kandari (Arabic: عيسى احمد الكندري; born 10 February 1963) is a Kuwaiti politician who has served in the National Assembly since 2023. He is also the current Deputy Prime Minister & Minister of National Assembly & Cabinet Affairs serving since 2013. Al-Kandari is the former deputy speaker of the 2016 National Assembly. He is a former Minister of Communications, Municipality, Housing, Social Affairs & Awqaf.

== Political career ==
Essa Al-Kandari was born on February 10, 1963, in Kuwait. He has a diploma from the Commercial Institute on the speciality of Commercial Banks. Before politics he used to work in Kuwait Airways. He first ran for parliament in the February 2012 election in the first district, losing after getting 4858 votes. He won his first election in 2013, getting 3326 votes. On 8 August 2013, he was appointed in the 33rd cabinet as Minister of Communications. The Ministry of the Municipality was added to his portfolio on January 5. On 16 October 2016, Essa resigned from the government in order to run for the 2016 election.

Essa won in the 2016 election with 4077 votes. He moved away from governmental positions running for deputy speaker position. He won the position on December 11 after getting 32 votes compared to Jamaan Al-Harbash’s 31. He ran again in the 2020 election winning with 3398 votes. In December 14, he was appointed as Minister of Social Affairs and Minister of Awqaf & Islamic Affairs. He was removed from the Ministry of Social Affairs on 2 March 2021. In August 1, Essa got appointed in the 40th cabinet as Minister of State for Housing & National Affairs. He resigned on August 29, 2022 in order to run in the 2022 election.

Essa Al-Kandari won getting 3683 votes in 2022 election. After the annulment of 2022 session & dissolution of the 2020 session, he ran in the 2023 election. He won with 3185 votes. He was appointed in the 43rd Cabinet as the Deputy Prime Minister and Minister of the National Assembly & Cabinet Affairs on June 18. He won the 2024 election, getting 3,678 votes in fifth place.

=== Election results ===
| Year | Votes polled |
|---|---|
| 2012 (Feb) | 4,858 (L) |
| 2013 | 3,326 (W) |
| 2016 | 4,077 (W) |
| 2020 | 3,398 (W) |
| 2022 | 3,683 (W) |
| 2023 | 3,185 (W) |
| 2024 | 3,678 (W) |
