= Ministry of Social Affairs (Kuwait) =

Government ministry of Kuwait

The Ministry of Social Affairs, previously known as the Ministry of Social Affairs and Labour, is one of the ministries of the State of Kuwait. The current Minister is Mai Jassem Al-Baghli.

== History ==
On December 14, 1954, Sheikh Abdullah Al-Salem Al-Sabah issued a decision of the Supreme Executive Committee under No. (T. 63/41) to establish the Department of Social Affairs, and on January 17, 1962, in accordance with Amiri Decree No. 2 of 1962, the name of the department was changed to “Ministry of Social Affairs and Labour” until the issuance of Law No. 109 of 2013, which stipulates the separation of the labour sector from the ministry and the change of the ministry’s name to (Ministry of Social Affairs), the State of Kuwait established the Public Authority for Manpower to assume all responsibilities related to the labour sector since its inception to this day.

== Tasks ==
The Department of Social Affairs seeks to achieve social welfare for all citizens, provide social services to those who request them, specifically those with special needs, work on regulating employment at the governmental and civil levels, combat unemployment, train national workers, and settle labour complaints, as well as undertake matters related to social guidance and direction, through publications, periodicals, and other media.

The social services provided by the department in 1956 extended to include the sale baskets that were granted free of charge to people with limited incomes, training girls through the establishment of a specialized center for finding an appropriate work, as well as establishing social units that take care of the family socially and financially, in addition to establishing a nursing home in 1957. Tasks were added to this department (social control of cinema, films, theater, works), other social and labour activities were added to the department's tasks, such as industrial credit, relations between workers and employers, labour inspection, vocational rehabilitation for people with disabilities, youth care, and supervision of clubs and bodies Eligibility, and adult education.

It also exercises its supervisory and regulatory role and supervises the elections of the boards of directors of cooperative societies and public benefit societies, which in turn have recently become electronically managed.
