= 1971 Kuwaiti general election =

General elections were held in Kuwait on 23 January 1971. A total of 183 candidates contested the election, which saw pro-government candidates remain the largest bloc in Parliament. Voter turnout was 51.6%.

== Results ==
Party	Votes	%	Seats	+/–
Pro-government candidates			20	0
Independents			13	–4
Sunni candidates			7	+6
Shi'ite candidates			6	–2
Secular opposition			4	0
Total			50	0
Total votes	20,785	–		
Registered voters/turnout	40,246	51.64		
Source: Nohlen et al.
