= Talal Khaled Al-Ahmad Al-Sabah =

Kuwaiti politician (born 1966)

Sheikh Talal Khaled Al-Ahmad Al-Sabah
- الشيخ طلال خالد الأحمد الصباح

First Deputy Prime Minister Minister of Interior
- In office 5 October 2022 – 25 December 2023
- Monarchs: Nawaf Al-Ahmad Al-Sabah; Mishal Al-Ahmad Al-Sabah
- Preceded by: Ahmad Al-Nawaf
- Succeeded by: Fahad Yusuf Al-Sabah

Minister of Defense
- In office 9 March 2022 – 5 October 2022
- Monarch: Nawaf Al-Ahmad Al-Sabah
- Preceded by: Hamad Jaber Al-Ali
- Succeeded by: Abdullah Ali Al-Salem

Personal details
- Born: 1966 (age 58–59); Kuwait City, Kuwait
- Political party: Independent

Talal Khaled Al-Ahmad Al-Sabah (Arabic: الشيخ طلال خالد الأحمد الصباح, born 1966), also known as Talal Al-Khaled, is a disgraced former Kuwaiti politician and ruling family member who previously served in the Kuwaiti government as the first deputy Prime Minister, Minister of Interior and Minister of Defense from 2022 till 2023. Additionally, he served as the Governor of the Capital Governorate.

He was convicted on 14 January 2025 for embezzlement and money laundering related to the “secret expenses” budgets of the Ministries of Defense and Interior. The Ministerial Court sentenced him to 14 years of imprisonment and imposed fines and restitution totaling approximately 98 million USD for funds misappropriated during his tenure.

== Early life ==
Talal Al-Khaled was born in 1966 in Kuwait. His father, Khaled Al-Ahmad, served as the minister of the Amiri Diwan from the institution’s founding until 1990. Al-Sabah pursued higher education in the United Kingdom, earning a bachelor’s degree in business management. His professional career began in 1983 in the oil industry, where he worked for various companies. From 1990 to 2001, he held the position of director of public relations at the Kuwait Oil Company . In November 2001, he transitioned to a role at the Kuwait Petroleum Corporation.

== Career ==
=== Business career ===
On 8 September 2004, Al-Sabah was appointed a board member in the Kuwait Petroleum Corporation and served there for three years until 25 September 2007. He later moved to the Kuwait Oil Tanker Company, to become the chairman of the board of directors of the company on 21 May 2013. He was later appointed CEO of the Oil Tankers Company on 28 July 2013, serving until 3 February 2019. On 24 March 2019, he was appointed governor of the Capital Governorate. He served in the post until he was appointed minister in the government.

=== Government service ===
Al-Sabah started serving in the government in 2022 holding the positions of minister of interior and minister of defense in multiple governments.

On 9 March 2022, Al-Sabah was appointed minister of defense after the resignation of Hamad Jaber Al-Ali. On 1 August, he was reappointed in the 40th Cabinet as deputy prime minister, minister of defense and acting minister of interior succeeding Ahmad Al-Nawaf.

On October 5, Talal Al-Khaled was appointed first deputy prime minister and minister of interior.

== Legal issues ==
=== Embezzlement of public funds and money laundering ===
On 2 July 2024, Talal Al-Khaled was brought to trial before the Ministerial Court following a referral of his case by the Permanent Investigation Committee, which had previously reviewed his testimony. He faced charges of embezzling public funds from the secret expense budgets of both the Ministries of Interior and Defense, during his tenure as the minister overseeing these departments. Subsequent to the court’s decision, Al Khalid was released on a bail of 2,000 Kuwaiti Dinars and was subject to a travel ban pending the outcome of the trial.

On 14 January 2025, Talal Al-Khaled Al-Sabah was convicted by the Ministerial Court for embezzlement and money laundering involving the “secret expenses” budgets of the Ministries of Defense and Interior. These funds were illicitly used for his personal gain during his tenure as the minister of these ministries. He was sentenced to a total of 14 years in prison, with seven years allocated for each offense. In addition, Al-Sabah was fined 20 million Kuwaiti dinars (approximately 65 million USD) and required to pay restitution of 10 million Kuwaiti dinars (around 33 million USD), the amount he was found to have embezzled.
