= 2020 Kuwaiti general election =

General election in Kuwait

- 5 December 2020
- 50 of the 65 seats in the National Assembly
- Turnout: 69.4% (▲4.2pp)

General elections were held in Kuwait on 5 December 2020. Two-thirds of the incumbents lost their seats, including the 2016 parliament's sole woman MP Safa Al Hashem.

== Background ==
Registration of candidates contesting for the 50 seats of the National Assembly took place between 26 October and 4 November 2020. 102 schools were used for the 2020 National Assembly elections on December 5. Each school had a clinic set up to check on the health condition of all those entering.

== Electoral system ==
The 50 elected members of the National Assembly are elected from five 10-seat constituencies by single non-transferable vote. Political parties are not officially licensed, therefore candidates run as individuals, although many political groups operate freely as de facto political parties. All Kuwaiti citizens (both male and female) above the age of 21 have the right to vote. Expatriate workers, who constituted 70% of the population, were not enfranchised.

== Results ==
Overall, opposition candidates won 24 seats, up from 16 in the previous parliament. The election was seen as a victory for the anti-government opposition bloc. Thirty of the elected candidates were under the age of 45; whilst there were 29 female candidates, none were elected, leaving the parliament without a female MP for the first time since the year 2012. There was a total of 567,694 registered voters, of which 394,131 cast a valid vote.

Constituency	Candidate	Votes	Notes
First Constituency	Hassan Abdullah Johar	5,849	Elected
First Constituency	Yusuf Fahad Al-Ghurayyeb	5,064	Elected
First Constituency	Ahmad Khalifa Al-Shuhoomi	4,129	Elected
First Constituency	Hamad Ahmad Rouhuddine	3,783	Elected
First Constituency	Essa Ahmad Al-Kandari	3,398	Elected
First Constituency	Ali Abdulrasoul Al-Qattan	3,320	Elected
First Constituency	Adnan Abdulsamad Zahed	3,052	Elected
First Constituency	Abdullah Mohammad Al-Turaiji	2,472	Elected
First Constituency	Abdullah Jassem Al-Mudhaf	3,437	Elected
First Constituency	Osama Essa Al-Shaheen	2,167	Elected
Second Constituency	Marzouq Ali Al-Ghanim	5,179	Elected
Second Constituency	Mohammad Barrak Al-Mutair	3,456	Elected
Second Constituency	Khalil Ibrahim Al-Saleh	3,117	Elected
Second Constituency	Hammad Mohammad Al-Matar	2,903	Elected
Second Constituency	Salman Khaled Al-Azmi	2,866	Elected
Second Constituency	Khaled Ayed Al-Enezi	2,565	Elected
Second Constituency	Bader Nasser Al-Humaidi	2,534	Elected
Second Constituency	Bader Hamed Al-Mulla	2,483	Elected
Second Constituency	Hamad Saif Al-Harshani	2,208	Elected
Second Constituency	Ahmad Mohammad Al-Hamad	2,195	Elected
Third Constituency	Abdulkareem Abdullah Al-Kandari	5,585	Elected
Third Constituency	Osama Ahmad Al-Munawer	3,858	Elected
Third Constituency	Muhannad Talal Al-Sayer	3,565	Elected
Third Constituency	Hesham Abdulsamad Al-Saleh	3,345	Elected
Third Constituency	Abdulaziz Tareq Al-Saqabi	3,340	Elected
Third Constituency	Yusuf Saleh Al-Fadhalah	2,992	Elected
Third Constituency	Mubarak Zaid Al-Mutairi	2,982	Elected
Third Constituency	Saadoun Hammad Al-Otaibi	2,979	Elected
Third Constituency	Fares Saad Al-Otaibi	2,942	Elected
Third Constituency	Muhalhal Khaled Al-Mudhaf	2,904	Elected
Fourth Constituency	Shuaib Shabbab Al-Muwaizri	6,200	Elected
Fourth Constituency	Fayez Ghannam Al-Mutairi	5,774	Elected
Fourth Constituency	Musa'ad Abdulrahman Al-Mutairi	5,750	Elected
Fourth Constituency	Mohammad Obaid Al-Rajhi	5,198	Elected
Fourth Constituency	Saud Saad Al-Mutairi	5,100	Elected
Fourth Constituency	Thamer Saad Al-Dhefeeri	4,935	Elected
Fourth Constituency	Marzouq Khalifa Al-Khalifa	4,760	Elected
Fourth Constituency	Farz Mohammad Al-Daihani	4,701	Elected
Fourth Constituency	Saad Ali Al-Rashidi	4,520	Elected
Fourth Constituency	Mubarak Haif Al-Hajraf	4,422	Elected
Fifth Constituency	Hamdan Salem Al-Azmi	8,387	Elected
Fifth Constituency	Bader Zayed Al-Azmi	8,371	Elected
Fifth Constituency	Mubarak Abdullah Al-Ajmi	6,801	Elected
Fifth Constituency	Al-Saifi Mubarak Al-Ajmi	6,294	Elected
Fifth Constituency	Khaled Mohammad Al-Otaibi	5,387	Elected
Fifth Constituency	Humoud Mebrek Al-Azmi	5,347	Elected
Fifth Constituency	Saleh Theyab Al-Mutairi	5,113	Elected
Fifth Constituency	Nasser Saad Al-Doseri	4,750	Elected
Fifth Constituency	Mohammad Hadi Al-Huweila	4,720	Elected
Fifth Constituency	Ahmad Abdullah Al-Azmi	4,651	Elected
Source: KUNA (1, 2, 3, 4, 5)

== Aftermath ==
Following the elections, a new Speaker of the National Assembly was elected on 15 December. Incumbent Speaker Marzouq Al-Ghanim was re-elected with 33 votes, defeating Bader Nasser Al-Humaidi, who received 28. Four members did not vote.

Candidate	Party	Votes	%
Marzouq Al-Ghanim	Independent	33	54.10
Bader Al Humaidi	Independent	28	45.90
Total		61	100.00
Valid votes		61	95.31
Invalid/blank votes		3	4.69
Total votes		64	100.00
Registered voters/turnout		65	98.46

Parliament unanimously approved a motion of noncooperation, meaning the cabinet must be replaced.
