= Hamdan Al-Azmi =

Kuwaiti lawyer and politician

- حمدان العازمي

Member of National Assembly of Kuwait
- Incumbent
- Assumed office August 6, 2013
- Constituency: Fifth District

Personal details
- Born: 16 April 1968 (age 57)
- Citizenship: Kuwait
- Occupation: Lawyer — Politician

Hamdan Salem Al-Azmi (Arabic: حمدان سالم العازمي; born 16 April 1968) is a Kuwaiti lawyer and politician serving in the National Assembly since 2013.

== Early career ==
Hamdan Al-Azmi was born on 16 April 1968 in Kuwait. He got his bachelor of law from Alexandria University. After that, he got his law degree from Tanta University. He later worked as a lawyer and a legal researcher at the Ministry of Interior. He got elected as treasurer in Rabiya & Omariya Cooperative Society.

== Political career ==
Hamdan Al-Azmi first ran in the February 2012 election. He later withdrew from that election. He later re-ran in the 2013 election winning with 2407 votes. In 29 November, he requested to grill Minister of Social Affairs Thekra Al-Rashidi due to violations of senior carehomes, cooperative societies and the labor sector. He got re-elected in the 2016 election getting 5038 votes. Hamdan got first place 2020 election in the fifth district with 8387 votes. On 5 January 2022, Hamdan Al-Azmi requested to grill minister of defense Hamad Jaber Al-Ali for allowing women to enter the Kuwaiti military. On 15 June he participated in a sit-in in the National Assembly which led to dissolution of parliament. He got first place again in the 2022 election. He won his fifth consecutive election in the 2023 election with 10893 votes. He won the 2024 election, getting 14,211 votes in second place.

=== Election results ===
Year	Votes polled
2013	2,407 (W)
2016	5,038 (W)
2020	8,387 (W)
2022	10,799 (W)
2023	10,863 (W)
2024	14,211 (W)
