= Ahmad Nawaf Al-Ahmad Al-Sabah =

Prime Minister of Kuwait from 2022 to 2023

His Highness Sheikh Ahmad Nawaf Al-Ahmad Al-Sabah
- الشيخ أحمد النواف الأحمد الصباح

9th Prime Minister of Kuwait
- In office 24 July 2022 – 17 January 2024
- Monarchs: Nawaf Al-Ahmad; Mishal Al-Ahmad
- Deputy: Talal Al-Khaled
- Preceded by: Sabah Al-Khaled
- Succeeded by: Mohammad Sabah Al-Salem

First Deputy Prime Minister and Minister of Interior
- In office 9 March 2022 – 24 July 2022
- Monarch: Nawaf Al-Ahmad
- Prime Minister: Sabah Al-Khalid
- Preceded by: Ahmad Mansour Al-Ahmad Al-Sabah
- Succeeded by: Talal Al-Khaled

Deputy Chief of National Guard
- In office 19 November 2020 – 9 March 2022
- Monarch: Nawaf Al-Ahmad
- Preceded by: Mishal Al-Ahmad
- Succeeded by: Faisal Al-Nawaf

Personal details
- Born: 1956 (age 69–70) Kuwait City, Sheikhdom of Kuwait
- Party: Independent
- Parent(s): Nawaf Al-Ahmad Al-Jaber Al-Sabah (father); Sharifa Sulaiman Al-Jassim (mother)

Ahmad Nawaf Al-Ahmad Al-Sabah (Arabic: الشيخ أحمد النواف الأحمد الصباح, romanized: ash-Shaykh ʾAḥmad al Nawwāf al-ʾAḥmad aṣ-Ṣabāḥ, born 1956) is a Kuwaiti politician and military officer who served as the Prime Minister of Kuwait from 24 July 2022 until his resignation on 20 December 2023. He is the eldest son of the late Nawaf Al-Ahmad Al-Jaber Al-Sabah, the former Emir of Kuwait.

== Former positions ==
He worked in the Ministry of Interior with the rank of lieutenant-general, then retired in 2014 and held the position of governor of Hawalli in the same year, and he represented the Emir of the country on more than one occasion. After Sheikh Mishal Al-Ahmad Al-Jaber Al-Sabah assumed the position of Crown Prince, the position of deputy chief of the National Guard became vacant, and he was appointed to the post with the rank of minister on 19 November 2020, and remained in the post until 9 March 2022.

He was previously a member of the Al-Arabi Club's general assembly, and was the football manager during the club's golden age. He also served as the president of the International Police Federation, and he also headed the Kuwait Police Federation.

== Ministerial positions ==
=== Minister of Interior ===
On 9 March 2022, a decree was issued appointing him as first deputy prime minister and minister of interior.

=== Prime minister ===
On 24 July 2022, an Emiri Decree was issued by the Crown Prince of Kuwait, Mishal Al-Ahmad Al-Jaber Al-Sabah, assigning him the role of prime minister and the formation of the fortieth government in the history of Kuwait. The government formation decree was issued on 1 August 2022. On 20 December 2023, he submitted the resignation of his cabinet as prime minister to the newly succeeded Emir Mishal Al-Sabah.

== Controversies ==
Ahmad Al-Nawaf was appointed prime minister during the reign of his father, Amir Sheikh Nawaf Al-Ahmad Al-Sabah, amidst a political deadlock in Kuwait and intense succession rivalry among the next generation of the ruling family. As an outside contender for crown prince, his tenure was marked by several controversies, which stemmed largely from his methods of consolidating power within Kuwait’s political landscape. These strategies included judicial interference, prosecuting political adversaries on corruption charges, leveraging significant influence in his father Amir Nawaf Al-Ahmad’s ruling court—particularly during the final period of his father’s life—to issue pardons to his supporters, and enacting broad personnel changes across government sectors to cultivate alliances within both the ruling family and parliament. Notably, his tenure was marked by the controversial appointment of his cousin and close political ally, Ahmad Al Fahad Al-Sabah—who had a criminal record for fraud—as the Minister of Defense.

On 20 December 2023, in a speech to parliament following the death of Emir Sheikh Nawaf Al-Ahmad, the new Emir, Sheikh Mishal Al-Ahmad Al-Sabah, described Ahmad Al-Nawaf’s actions as “systematic sabotage” of state institutions for personal gain. On the same day, Ahmad Al-Nawaf resigned as prime minister, continuing in a caretaker capacity until Sheikh Mohammad Al-Sabah was sworn in as his successor on 17 January 2024.

=== Judicial Interference ===
On 19 March 2023, the Kuwaiti Constitutional Court declared the 2022 parliamentary elections void, reinstating the 2020 National Assembly. This decision followed the unconstitutional dissolution of the 2020 assembly in 2022, which had been justified by Prime Minister Ahmad Al-Nawaf's claims of non-cooperation, despite his absence from any sessions of that assembly.

Shortly after the court's ruling, the head of the Prime Minister's Office summoned Justice Mohammad bin Naji, the Chief Justice of the Constitutional Court, requesting his resignation in accordance with what he claimed were the desires of the "political leadership." Justice bin Naji tendered his resignation, which the Supreme Judicial Council rejected, citing it as an example of the executive branch interfering with the judiciary. Justice bin Naji submitted his resignation once more, which was accepted by the Supreme Judicial Council two weeks later.

On 6 April 2023, Marzouq Al-Ghanim, Speaker of the Parliament, and Obaid Al-Wasmi, head of the legislative committee, held a press conference. Al-Ghanim criticized Prime Minister Al-Nawaf for interfering with the judiciary by pushing for the resignation of the Chief Justice, labelling Al-Nawaf a “danger to Kuwait.” He also emphasized the necessity for Al-Nawaf to take the constitutional oath of office before Parliament to officially commence his duties, underscoring the separation of powers.

=== Appointment of Fraud Convict as Minister of Defense ===
On 18 June 2023, Prime Minister Ahmad Al-Nawaf appointed his first cousin and political ally, Sheikh Ahmad Al-Fahad Al-Sabah, as the Minister of Defense. This decision was met with significant public and media backlash due to Sheikh Ahmad Al-Fahad's criminal record; he had been convicted of fraud by a Swiss court in 2021 for orchestrating a fraudulent arbitration. The decision to appoint a convicted felon to a high-profile government position raised serious questions about the integrity of political appointments and their broader implications for governance. This controversy also became a focal point in an interpolation by MP Muhalhal Al-Mudhaf challenging Prime Minister Al-Nawaf’s judgment.

=== Selective Pardons ===
During Ahmad Al-Nawaf’s tenure, his administration was characterized by the issuance of selective pardons, strategically aimed at bolstering his political alliances. These controversial pardons, executed in late November 2023, coincided notably with the final weeks of his father Amir Nawaf Al-Ahmad Al-Sabah’s life, during which Ahmad Al-Nawaf leveraged significant influence within his father’s ruling court to secure these decisions. The pardons were also strategically timed just days prior to Ahmad Al-Nawaf’s parliamentary questioning by MP Muhalhal Al-Mudhaf.

Pardons were typically granted to individuals who had expressed political support for Ahmad Al-Nawaf. For example, Abdullah Al-Saleh, a London-based YouTuber who supported Ahmad Al-Nawaf's candidacy for crown prince, received a pardon. To secure the backing of the Mutair tribe during his parliamentary questioning, Ahmad Al-Nawaf pardoned tribe members who had been jailed for conducting an illegal tribal primary. In a similar vein to win over the Shia community, he pardoned the leader of a Hezbollah terrorist cell, sentenced to life imprisonment for stockpiling weapons on his farm. Additionally, in order to win over tribal and Salafist MPs, he pardoned Shafi Sultan al-Ajmi, a Specially Designated Global Terrorist.

Additionally, Ahmad Al-Nawaf pardoned Athbi Al-Fahad, his first cousin and political ally, a former head of state security who had previously been convicted for organizing and running a disinformation campaign known as the Fintas group incident, aimed at inciting insurrection. Collectively, these pardons underscored a clear pattern of exploiting his father’s declining health and political authority to influence Kuwait’s political dynamics and parliamentary alliances, raising significant questions about the motivations behind such decisions. Following the resignation of Ahmad Al-Nawaf subsequent to the death of his father, Emir Nawaf Al-Ahmad Al-Sabah, on 16 December 2023, the new Emir, Sheikh Mishal Al-Ahmad Al-Sabah, publicly denounced Ahmad Al-Nawaf's use of selective pardons.
