= Abdulkarim Al-Kanderi =

Kuwaiti politician

- عبدالكريم الكندري
- Born: January 27th 1981
- Citizenship: Kuwait
- Education: Ph.D. in Commercial Law, Master of Commercial Law, Bachelor of Law, Kuwait University, University of Strasbourg.
- Occupations: Politician, assistant professor.
- Organization(s): Kuwait Lawyers Association, University of Strasbourg Center of Commercial Law.
- Known for: Member of Parliament of the Kuwait Parliament.

Abdulkarim Abdullah Al-Kanderi (Arabic: عبدالكريم الكندري; born 27 January 1981) is a Kuwaiti lawyer and former member of the Kuwait National Assembly, representing the third district.

== Career ==
Al-Kanderi was initially elected in the Kuwaiti General Elections securing the tenth seat in the third constituency with 1,424 votes. In subsequent elections, he continued to succeed; in 2016, he won the fourth seat with 3,325 votes, and in 2020, he ascended to the first seat with 5,585 votes. He maintained the third seat in the 2022 and 2023 elections with 6,915 and 5,878 votes respectively. In 2024, he achieved a personal best by winning the first seat again with 9,428 votes.

Al-Kanderi has been active in various parliamentary committees, including the National Human Resources Development Committee, the Woman and Family Committee, the Human Rights Committee, the Committee for the Draft Response to the Emiri Speech, the Legislative and Legal Affairs Committee, and the Education, Culture and Guidance Committee.
