= Obaid Al-Wasmi =

Kuwaiti member of parliament

- عبيد الوسمي
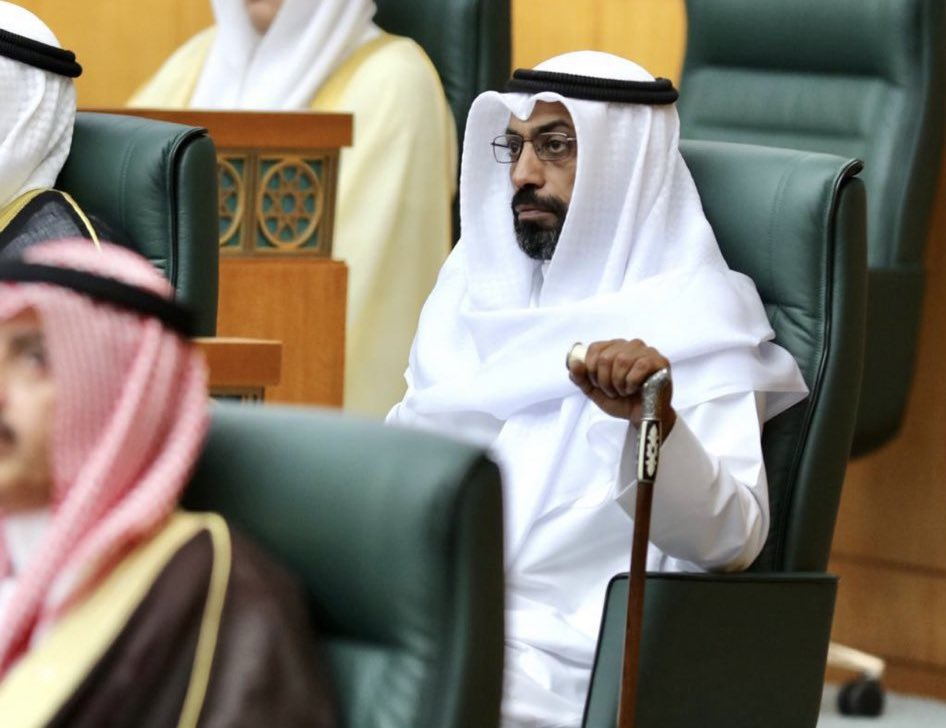

Member of the Kuwait National Assembly
- In office 17 April 2024 – 10 May 2024
- Constituency: Fourth District

Personal details
- Born: January 5, 1971 (age 55)
- Citizenship: Kuwait
- Education: American University, Washington, DC

Obaid Mohammed Abdullah Zaid Obaid Al-Mutairi (Arabic: عبيد محمد عبد الله زيد عبيد المطيري; born January 5, 1971), also known as Obaid Al-Wasmi, is a Kuwaiti academic, politician and former member of the Kuwaiti National Assembly. He is also a doctor and lecturer in procedural law at the College of Law of Kuwait University. Al-Mutairi was a member of the annulled February 2012 National Assembly. In a by-election held on May 22, 2021, for the Fifth Constituency, Al-Mutairi achieved first place with 43,810 votes, marking the highest number ever recorded in Kuwaiti parliamentary election history.

== Education ==
Obaid Al-Wasmi graduated from Kuwait University in 1994 and pursued his postgraduate studies in the United Kingdom, where he earned a master's degree. He later received a Ph.D. in litigation law with distinction from the American University in Washington.

== Political career ==
Obaid Al-Wasmi ran in the February 2012 Kuwaiti National Assembly elections representing the fourth district, securing the third position with 22,068 votes. Although successful, the assembly was later nullified by a ruling from the Kuwaiti Constitutional Court. Al-Wasmi is regarded as a leading opposition figure in Kuwaiti politics, advocating for a constitutional emirate and a parliamentary government. He is also a litigation lawyer in the Gulf. He defended Qatari poet Mohammad bin Al-Dheeb, a prisoner of conscience.

On September 23, 2020, Al-Wasmi, along with Abdullah Al-Nafisi, introduced a document called "The Kuwait Document" as an initial step to address the current political and economic situation, presenting it to then Deputy Emir Sheikh Nawaf Al-Ahmad Al-Sabah.

On April 23, 2021, Al-Wasmi announced his candidacy for a by-election to fill the vacant seat of Badr Al-Dahoum through a tweet: "I declare my candidacy for the by-election (for the seat of) brother Dr. Badr Zayed Al-Dahoum until his return, God willing, as a guest of the fifth constituency and its people. We ask God for success and ask for your support and acceptance in this (constitutional referendum)." His candidacy was met with parliamentary and public support, and several candidates withdrew from the race in his favor. The by-election, held on May 22, 2021, resulted in Al-Wasmi achieving first place with 43,810 votes, setting a record for the highest number in Kuwait's political history, while his closest competitor, Ajmi Al-Matlaq, secured second place with 1,331 votes.
