= Mishal Al-Ahmad Al-Jaber Al-Sabah =

Emir of Kuwait since 2023

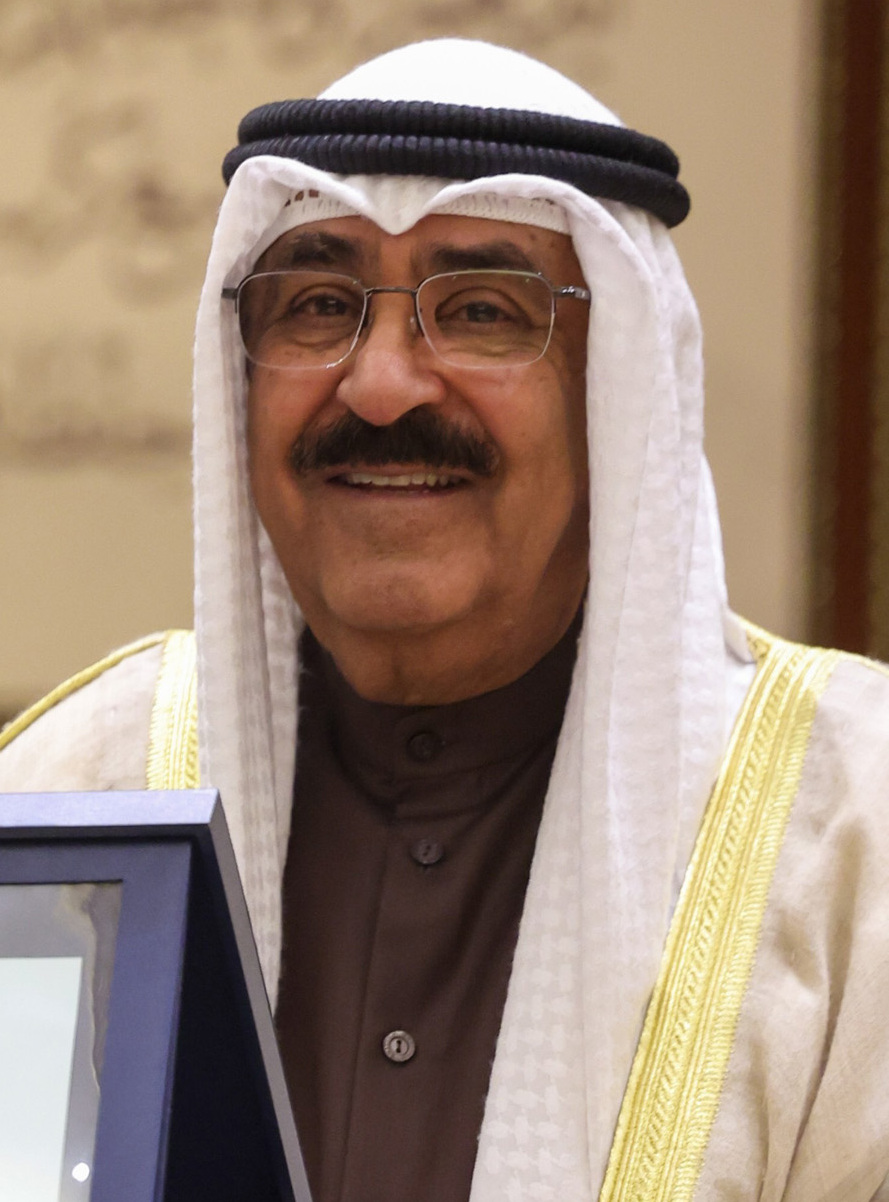
- Mishal in 2024

Emir of Kuwait
- Reign: 16 December 2023 – present
- Predecessor: Nawaf Al-Ahmad Al-Jaber Al-Sabah
- Heir apparent: Sabah Al-Khalid Al-Sabah
- Born: 27 September 1940 (age 86); Kuwait City, Sheikhdom of Kuwait
- Spouses: Nuria Sabah Al-Salem Al-Sabah; Munira Badah Al-Mutairi
- Issue: 12
Names
- Mishal Al Ahmad Al Jaber Al Mubarak Bin Sabah Al Jaber Bin Abdullah Al Sabah
- House: Sabah
- Father: Ahmad Al-Jaber Al-Sabah
- Mother: Maryam Marit Al-Huwaila
- Religion: Sunni Islam

Mishal Al-Ahmad Al-Jaber Al-Sabah (Note: Arabic: اَلشَّيْخ مِشْعَلَ الْأَحْمَدَ الْجَابِرَ الصَّبَاح, romanized: ash-shaykh Mishʻal al-ʾAḥmad al-Jābir aṣ-Ṣabāḥ) (born 27 September 1940) is Emir of Kuwait, reigning since 2023. Mishal spent most of his career in Kuwait's security and intelligence apparatus. Prior to becoming Emir at age 83, he was the oldest crown prince in the world.

== Biography ==
Mishal was born on 27 September 1940 to Ahmad Al-Jaber Al-Sabah during his father's reign (1921–1950) as the tenth ruler of the Sheikhdom of Kuwait. Mishal was Ahmad's seventh son, and is the paternal younger half-brother of three emirs of Kuwait: Jaber Al-Ahmad Al-Jaber Al-Sabah (1977–2006), Sabah Al-Ahmad Al-Jaber Al-Sabah (2006–2020) and Nawaf Al-Ahmad Al-Jaber Al-Sabah (2020–2023).

Mishal attended the Al Mubarakiya School in Kuwait for primary education, then went abroad to the United Kingdom for studies at the Hendon Police College, from which he graduated in 1960. After graduation from Hendon, Mishal joined the Kuwaiti Ministry of Interior (MOI). From 1967 to 1980, he served as head of the MOI's intelligence and state security service. In this role, he oversaw the intelligence organization's development into the Kuwait State Security service, and Mishal served as its first director.

On 13 April 2004, then-Emir Jaber Al-Ahmad Al-Jaber Al-Sabah named Mishal as a minister-level deputy chief of the Kuwait National Guard (KNG), replacing Nawaf in the position. This is one of Kuwait's most powerful interior defense positions. He became the de facto head of the KNG, as the chief is a symbolic position held by Salem Al-Ali Al-Sabah, the most senior member of the House of Sabah

At the KNG, Mishal led a reform of the agency and crackdown on corruption. During Mishal's tenure, the KNG joined the International Association of Gendarmeries and Police Forces with Military Status (FIEP) in 2019. Mishal stepped down from his position at the KNG in 2020 upon nomination as Crown Prince.

Shortly after his half-brother Sabah became emir in 2006, Mishal was considered one of the top three decision-makers in the Al-Sabah ruling family. During his tenure, Mishal had reportedly turned down more senior roles in order to avoid political disputes and maintain his relationships in the family.

As his half-brother Sabah's health started to fail, Mishal's influence grew, and he accompanied Sabah on official visits, including to the Mayo Clinic in the United States for medical treatment.

=== Crown Prince ===
Crown Prince Nawaf became emir upon the death of his half-brother Sabah on 29 September 2020. According to Kuwaiti law, Nawaf had a one-year period in which to select his crown prince. After a record-short eight days, he selected his half-brother Mishal on 7 October. At a special session of the Kuwait National Assembly the next day, all 59 members of parliament unanimously approved Mishal's appointment. Upon assuming the role of crown prince at the age of 80, Mishal became the world's oldest crown prince.

The appointment of Mishal, among the Kuwaiti ruling family's oldest members, was interpreted by some analysts as a sign that the country rulers wanted to avoid significant change, such as a transition to the next generation of leaders. Mishal was chosen instead of other, perhaps more controversial, candidates for crown prince including former Prime Ministers Nasser Al-Mohammed Al-Sabah and Jaber Al-Mubarak Al-Sabah, or Deputy Prime Minister Nasser Sabah Al-Ahmad Al-Sabah.

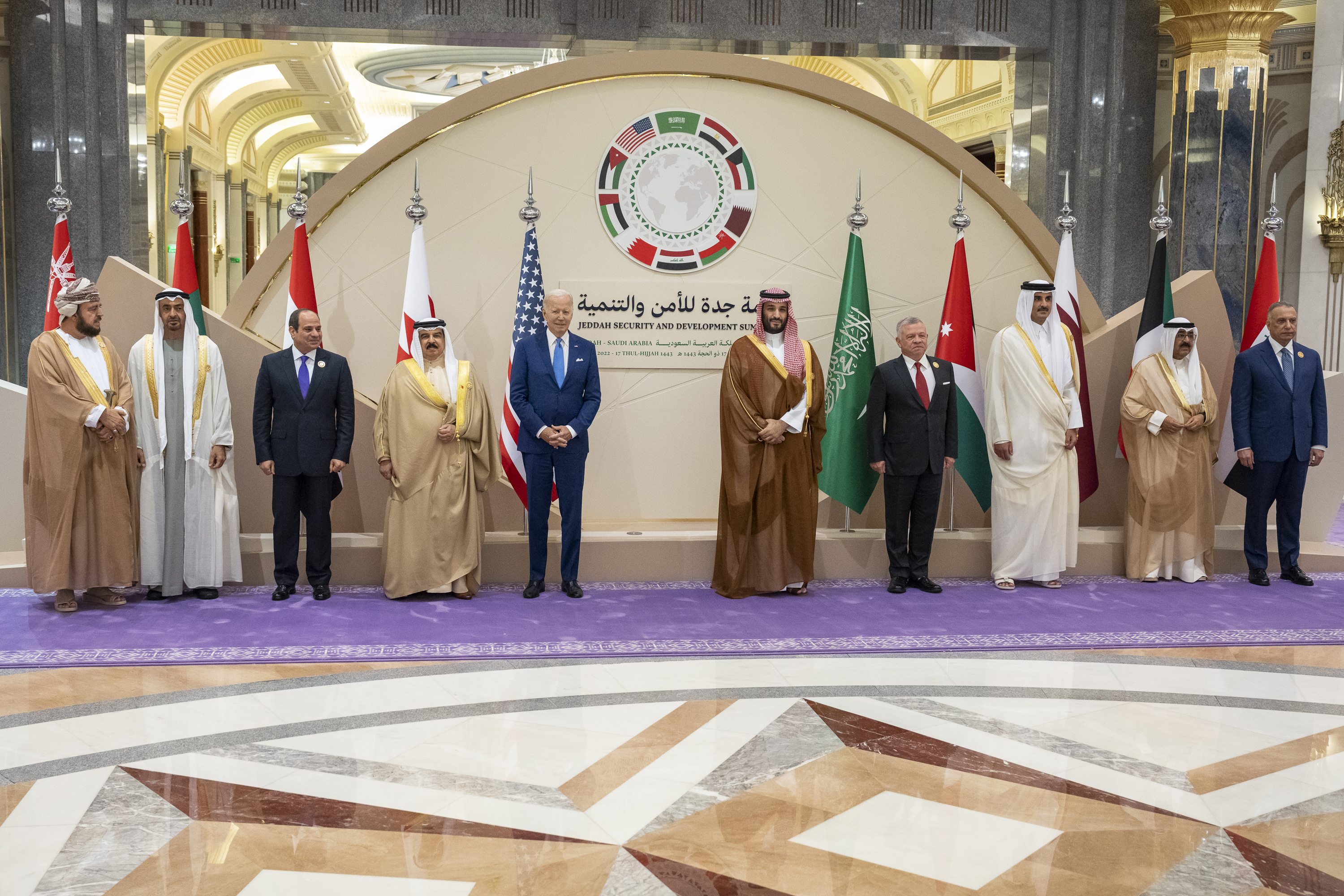
Arab leaders, US president Joe Biden and Mishal (second from right) at the GCC+3 summit in Jeddah, 16 July 2022

Mishal was expected to assume a larger role than previous crown princes due to Nawaf's advanced age. For example, on 2 September 2021, Mishal spoke with US Vice President Kamala Harris about US–Kuwait bilateral relations and Kuwait's role in the evacuation of Afghanistan.

In response to political gridlock in Kuwait, Crown Prince Mishal, not Nawaf, announced the dissolution of the Kuwait National Assembly on 17 April 2023, citing in a television address a law that empowered the emir to do so.

Mishal has also represented Kuwait at important events abroad, including the state funeral of Queen Elizabeth II at Westminster Abbey, London in 2022 and the wedding of Hussein, Crown Prince of Jordan in 2023.

=== Ruler of Kuwait ===
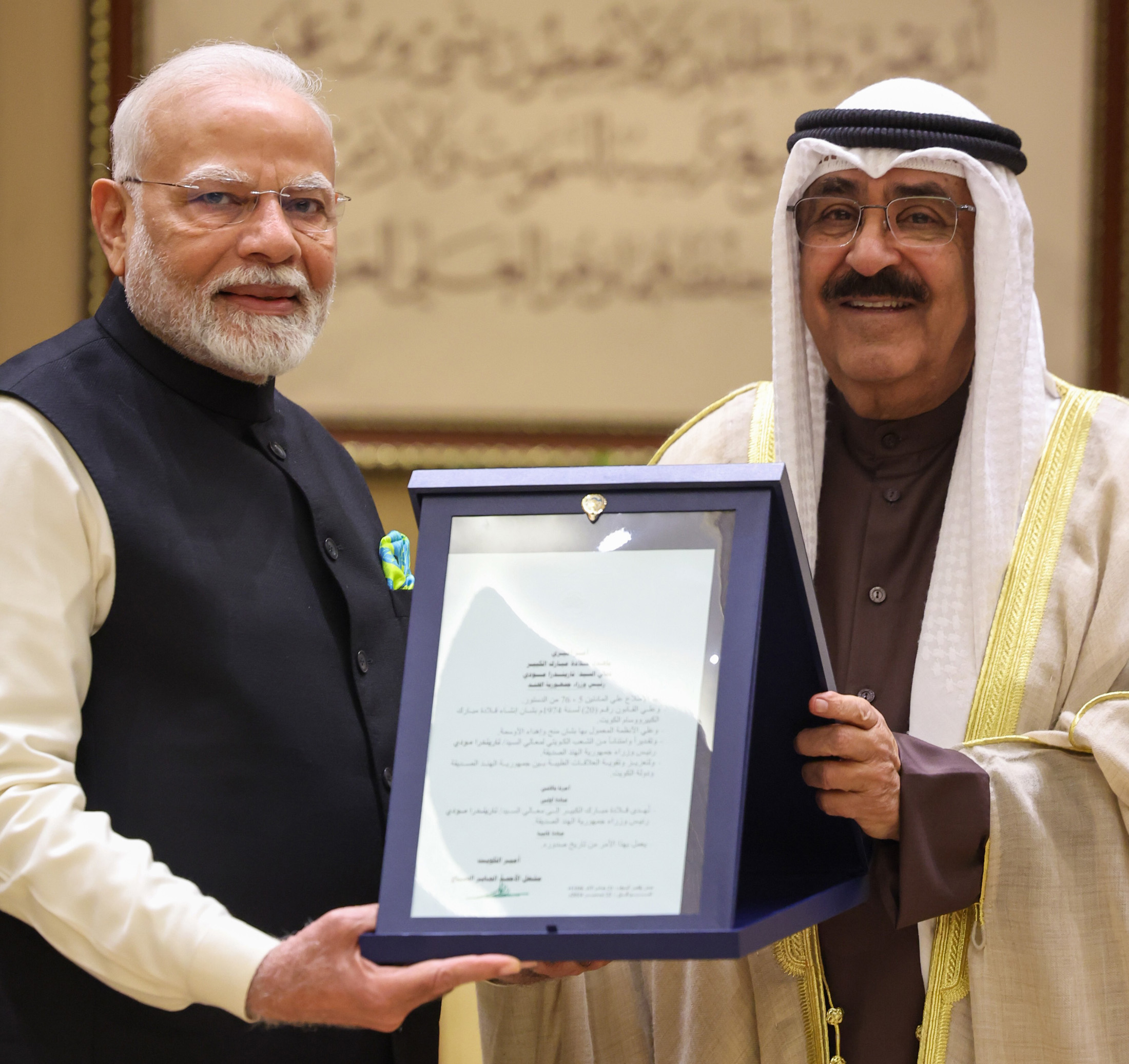
Emir of Kuwait Mishal met with Prime Minister Modi of India in 2024

Mishal became the emir of Kuwait following the death of the previous emir, his half-brother Nawaf Al-Ahmad Al-Jaber Al-Sabah, on 16 December 2023, following hospitalisation in November for a medical emergency.

On 15 February 2024, Mishal dissolved the National Assembly amidst escalating tensions between the nascent government and parliamentarians, resulting in a nationwide deadlock exacerbated by the use of offensive and inappropriate language. Three months later, on 10 May, he disbanded the parliament for the second time and suspended selected constitutional articles for a duration not exceeding four years, following weeks of political strain subsequent to the snap election in April.

He consolidated his power by appointing the crown prince, his nephew Sabah Al-Khalid Al-Sabah, without the constitutionally required parliamentary vetting in June 2024.

Under Mishal's leadership, Kuwait became known for a large-scale campaign to revoke citizenship, with tens of thousands of people stripped of their nationality by a state committee. The measures included retroactive revocations affecting women who gained citizenship through marriage and others reclassified as stateless. Human rights groups criticised the process for its lack of transparency and for increasing the risk of statelessness and loss of basic rights, prompting domestic and international concern.

During his rule, Iran began striking Kuwait during the 2026 Iran War, Mishal repeatedly condemned the attacks and addressed it in the Kuwaiti State Television.

== Personal life ==
Mishal has 2 wives: Nuria Sabah Al-Salem Al-Sabah and Munira Badah Al-Mutairi. He has 12 children: 5 sons and 7 daughters. He was a founder and served as honorary president of the Kuwait Amateur Radio Society. He has also been the honorary president of the Kuwait Aircraft Engineer Pilots Association and of the Diwan of Poets.

== Honors ==
- France:
  - Commander of the Legion of Honour (4 December 2018), awarded by Florence Parly, Minister of the Armed Forces
  - Grand Cross of the Legion of Honor (19 October 2026), awarded by Emmanuel Macron, President of France
- Bahrain: Member Exceptional Class of the Order of Sheikh Isa bin Salman Al Khalifa (13 February 2024)
- Saudi Arabia: Collar of the Order of King Abdulaziz (30 January 2024)
- Oman: Collar of the Order of Al-Said (6 February 2024)
- Qatar: Sword of the Founder Sheikh Jassim bin Mohammed bin Thani (20 February 2024)
- United Arab Emirates: Collar of the Order of Zayed (5 March 2024)
- Egypt: Grand Cordon of the Order of the Nile (30 April 2024)
- Jordan: Collar of the Order of Al-Hussein bin Ali (23 April 2024)
- Turkey: First Class of the Order of the State of the Republic of Turkey (7 May 2024)

== See also ==
- List of international emiri trips made by Mishal Al-Ahmad

== Notes ==
Mishal Al-Ahmad Al-Jaber Al-Sabah House of Sabah Born: 27 September 1940
Regnal titles
Preceded by Nawaf Al-Ahmad Al-Jaber Al-Sabah	Emir of Kuwait; 16 December 2023 – present	Incumbent; Heir apparent: Sabah Al-Khalid Al-Sabah
