= Nawaf Al-Ahmad Al-Jaber Al-Sabah =

Emir of Kuwait from 2020 to 2023

Nawaf Al-Ahmad Al-Jaber Al-Sabah نَوَّاف الأَحمَد الْجَابِر الصَّباح
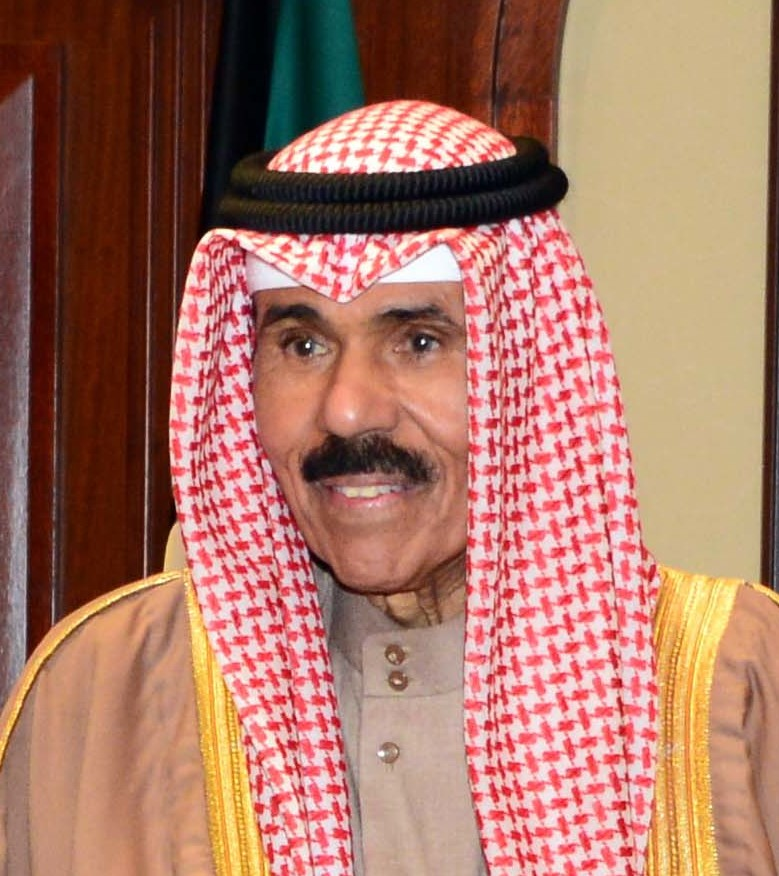
- Nawaf in 2018

Emir of Kuwait
- Reign: 29 September 2020 – 16 December 2023
- Predecessor: Sabah Al-Ahmad Al-Jaber
- Successor: Mishal Al-Ahmad Al-Jaber
- Prime ministers: Sabah Al-Khalid Al-Sabah (2020–2022); Ahmad Nawaf Al Ahmad (2022–2023)
- Born: 25 June 1937; Kuwait City, Sheikhdom of Kuwait
- Died: 16 December 2023 (aged 86); Al-Siddiq, Hawalli Governorate, Kuwait
- Burial: 17 December 2023; Sulaibikhat Cemetery
- Spouse: Sharifa Sulaiman Al-Jassim
- Issue: Sheikh Ahmad; Sheikh Faisal; Sheikh Abdullah; Sheikh Salem; Sheikha Sheikha
- Arabic: نواف الأحمد الجابر الصباح
- House: Sabah
- Father: Ahmad Al-Jaber Al-Sabah
- Mother: Yamama
- Religion: Sunni Islam

Sheikh Nawaf Al-Ahmad Al-Jaber Al-Sabah (Arabic: نَوَّاف الأَحمَد الْجَابِر الصَّباح, romanized: Nawwāf al-ʾAḥmad al-Jābir aṣ-Ṣabāḥ; 25 June 1937 – 16 December 2023) was Emir of Kuwait from 2020 until his death in 2023.

He was minister of interior (1978–1988, 2003–2006), minister of defense (1988–1991) and deputy prime minister (2020–2023). Nawaf was nominated as crown prince on 7 February 2006, during the reign of his half-brother Sabah Al-Ahmad Al-Jaber Al-Sabah. During his three-year rule as emir, he grappled with internal political disputes.

== Early life and education ==
Nawaf Al-Ahmed Al-Jaber Al-Sabah was born on 25 June 1937. He was a son of the tenth ruler of Kuwait, Ahmad Al-Jaber Al-Sabah. He studied at various schools in Kuwait, among them Hamada, Sharq, Al-Naqra, Eastern and Mubarakiya.

== Career ==
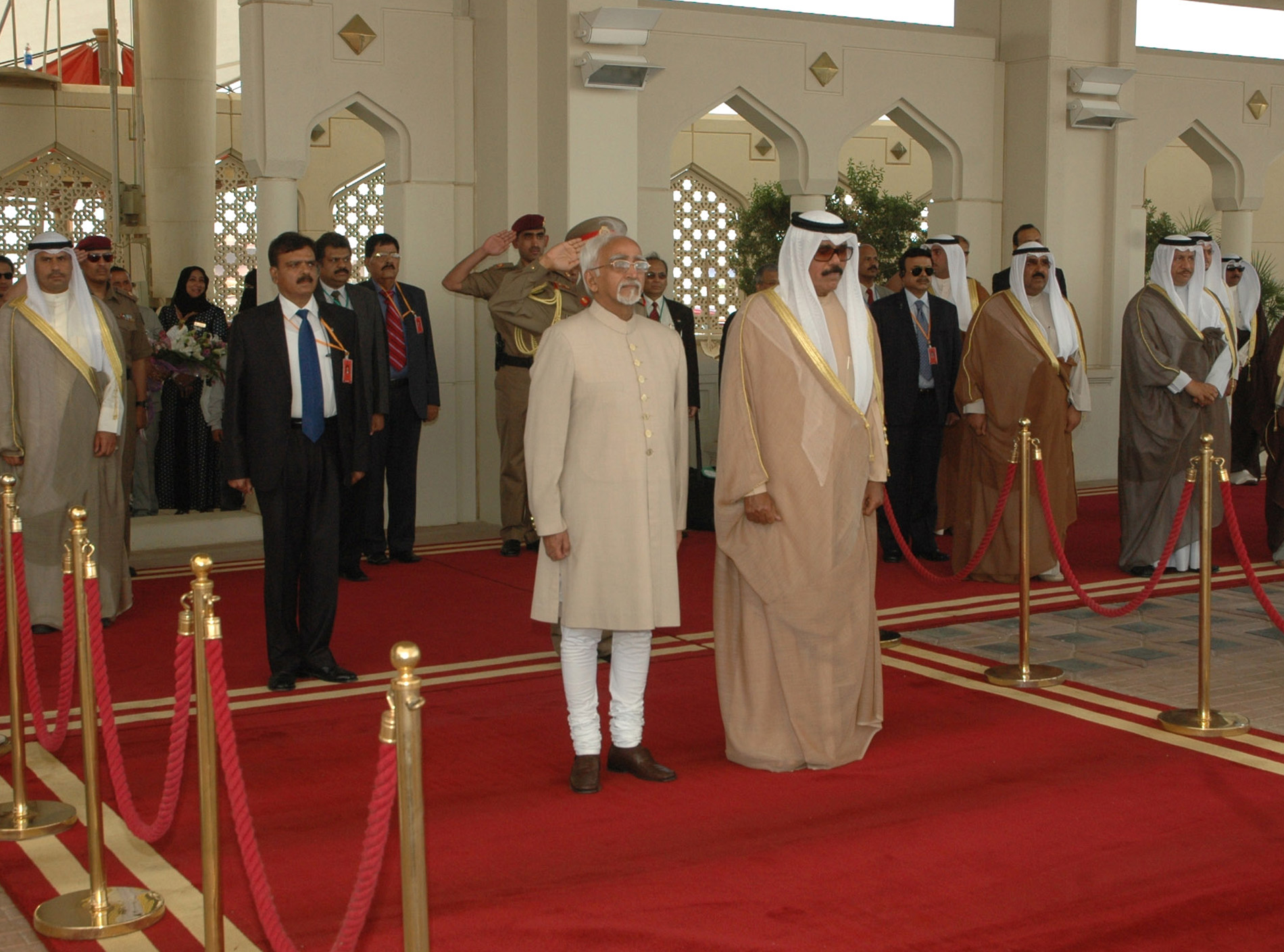
Then Vice President of India Mohammad Hamid Ansari with Nawaf in April 2009

Nawaf became one of the most senior members of the House of Sabah over the course of his life. At 25, he was appointed governor of Hawalli on 21 February 1962 and held the post until 19 March 1978. He was Minister of Interior from 1978 to 26 January 1988, when he was appointed Minister of Defense. Following the liberation of Kuwait in the Gulf War, Nawaf was appointed the acting minister of labor and social affairs on 20 April 1991 and held the post until 17 October 1992. Following his appointment to the cabinet in 1991, a group of senior military officers sent a letter to Jaber al-Ahmad, the Emir at the time, demanding that Nawaf, the minister of defense during the Iraqi invasion of Kuwait, and Salem al-Sabah, the minister of interior during the invasion, be dismissed from the government and investigated for Kuwait's lack of military preparedness on the day of the invasion. As a result, Nawaf was not appointed to a cabinet-level position until 2003.

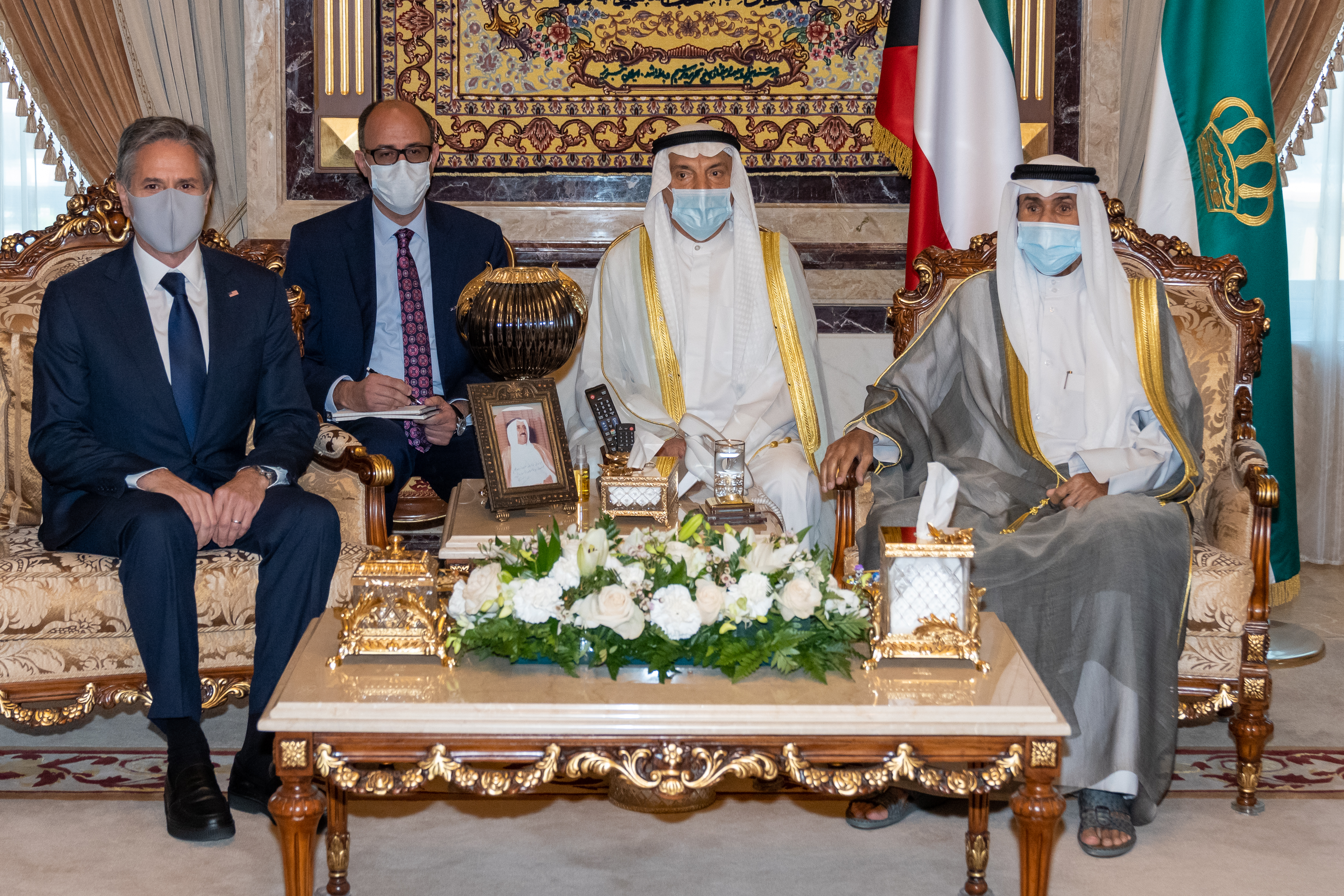
United States Secretary of State Antony Blinken speaks with Sheikh Nawaf, July 2021

On 16 October 1994, Nawaf was appointed deputy chief of the Kuwait National Guard and held that post until 2003. The same year, he reassumed the post of minister of the interior until an Amiri Decree was issued on 16 October 2003 making him first Deputy Prime Minister of Kuwait and Minister of Interior. Nawaf played a role in supporting programs that support national unity among the Cooperation Council for the Arab States of the Gulf and Arab countries.

With the ascendance of Sabah Al-Ahmad Al-Jaber Al-Sabah to the leadership of Kuwait on 29 January 2006, an Amiri Decree was issued on 7 February 2006 officially designating Nawaf the crown prince. This was contrary to the tradition of the Al-Sabah family, according to which the offices of emir and crown prince are supposed to alternate between the Al-Jaber and Al-Salem branches.

Sabah died on 29 September 2020 and Nawaf was announced as the emir of Kuwait during a meeting of the National Assembly.

Upon assuming power in 2020, Sheikh Nawaf guided Kuwait through substantial domestic political and economic challenges. His tenure was marked by the coronavirus pandemic, a significant decline in oil prices, and ongoing political crises, primarily due to conflicts between the parliament and the government.

As a key member of the Organization of Petroleum Exporting Countries (OPEC), Kuwait's economy heavily relies on oil exports. According to official statistics, the country's gross domestic product was $184 billion in 2022. Kuwait exports 2.8 million barrels of oil daily and has a population of approximately 4.3 million.

== Personal life ==
Nawaf married Sharifa Sulaiman Al-Jasem Al-Ghanim, daughter of Sulaiman Al-Jasem Al-Ghanim by his wife, Ruqayyah bint Abdullah Al-Abd Al-Razzaq. They have four sons and a daughter.

=== Health and death ===
In 2021, it was reported that Nawaf had received treatment in the United States for an unspecified medical condition.

On 29 November 2023, Nawaf was admitted to hospital following an emergency health issue. He died on 16 December 2023, at the age of 86, and was succeeded as Emir by his half-brother Mishal.

The funeral was limited to his family and held at the Bilal bin Rabah mosque in the al-Siddiq region, after which he was buried in Sulaibikhat Cemetery.

== Honors and awards ==
- Spain: Knight Grand Cross of the Order of Civil Merit (23 May 2008)
- Argentina: Grand Cross of the Order of the Liberator General San Martín (1 August 2011)
- United Arab Emirates: Collar of the Order of Zayed (29 January 2007)
- Palestine: Grand Collar of the State of Palestine (13 November 2018)

== See also ==
- Fahad Al-Ahmed Al-Jaber Al-Sabah
- House of Al-Sabah
- Mubarak Abdullah Al-Jaber Al-Sabah
- Salem Al-Ali Al-Sabah

Nawaf Al-Ahmad Al-Jaber Al-Sabah House of Sabah Born: 25 June 1937 Died: 16 December 2023
Regnal titles
Preceded by Sabah Al-Ahmad Al-Jaber Al-Sabah	Emir of Kuwait; 2020–2023	Succeeded by Mishal Al-Ahmad Al-Jaber Al-Sabah
