= Political issues in Kuwait =

Important political issues in Kuwait include rights for immigrant workers, stateless people, and education reform. Kuwait has the largest number of stateless people in the entire region. The Bedoon issue in Kuwait is largely sectarian.

== Foreign workers ==
Since the 1970s, the Kuwaiti government annually announces that Kuwait will reduce the number of expatriates. Human rights organizations frequently criticize Kuwait for the human rights abuses toward foreign nationals. Foreign nationals account for 70% of Kuwait's total population. The kafala system leaves foreign nationals prone to exploitation. Administrative deportation is very common in Kuwait for minor offenses, including minor traffic violations. Kuwait is one of the world's worst offenders in human trafficking. Hundreds of thousands of foreign nationals are subjected to numerous human rights abuses including inhumane conditions of involuntary servitude by employers in Kuwait. They are subjected to physical and sexual abuse, non-payment of wages, poor work conditions, threats, confinement to the home, and withholding of passports to restrict their freedom of movement.

Repeated abusers include M A Al-Kharafi & Sons and its subsidiary Kharafi National that have been cited by human rights organizations and the United States Department of State Country Report on Human Rights Practices for Kuwait. Many human rights organizations have accused Kuwait of apartheid policies toward foreign nationals.

Kuwait is considered one of the most xenophobic countries in the world. A recent proposal by a Kuwaiti lawmaker restricts all expats to only five years residence in Kuwait, all expats will be deported after living 5 years in Kuwait. Another Kuwaiti lawmaker recently called for the deportation of 1.4 million expats, the lawmaker believes 280,000 expats should be deported annually. Kuwait also banned expatriates from driving.

In August 2008, Abdullah Al-Roumi declared that he was going to draft a law to scrap Kuwait's "kafeel" foreign worker sponsorship system, under which expatriates must be sponsored by a local employer to get a work permit: "The government should be the only kafeel... We have scores of bachelors residing in Kuwait with an equal number of crimes. Many are caused due to the 'trading with humans' issue which taints the reputation of Kuwait."

In the political debates over the Kuwaiti minimum wage, some politicians have dismissed past wage increases as "too small" and not enough to meet the steep hikes in consumer prices. On February 21, 2008, the country approved a 120 dinar ($440) monthly pay rise for nationals in the public and private sectors after inflation hit 7.3%, a 15-year high. It also decided to raise by 50 dinars ($183) the pay of foreigners employed by the government. In response, Al-Enezi said, "We reject this increase because it is well below expectations. We urge the government to review its decision."

On September 22, 2008, politician Saleh Al-Mulla demanded from Minister of Social Affairs and Labor Bader Al-Duwailah a list of companies involved in human trafficking. Mulla also asked about the measures taken against the violating companies and other steps that would be taken in the future to prevent such violations from taking place.

== Bedoon ==
=== History ===
Kuwait has the largest number of stateless people in the entire region. Most stateless Bedoon of Kuwait belong to the northern tribes, especially the Al-Muntafiq tribal confederation. A minority of stateless Bedoon in Kuwait belong to the 'Ajam community.

Under the terms of the Kuwait Nationality Law 15/1959, all the Bedoon in Kuwait are eligible for Kuwaiti nationality by naturalization. In practice, it is widely believed that Sunnis of Persian descent or tribal Saudis can readily achieve Kuwaiti naturalization whilst Bedoon of Iraqi tribal ancestry cannot. As a result, many Bedoon in Kuwait feel pressured to hide their background.

From 1965 until 1985, the Bedoon were treated as Kuwaiti citizens and guaranteed citizenship: they had free access to education, health care and all the other privileges of citizenship. The stateless Bedoon constituted 80-90% of the Kuwaiti Army in the 1970s and 1980s until the Gulf War.

In 1985 at the height of the Iran–Iraq War, the Bedoon were reclassified as "illegal residents" and denied Kuwaiti citizenship and its accompanying privileges. The Iran–Iraq War threatened Kuwait's internal stability and the authorities feared the sectarian background of the stateless Bedoon. The Bedoon issue in Kuwait “overlaps with historic sensitivities about Iraqi influence inside Kuwait”, with many of those denied Kuwaiti nationality being believed to have originated from Iraq.

In 1985, the then emir, Jaber Al-Ahmad Al-Sabah, escaped an assassination attempt. After the assassination attempt, the government changed the Bedoon's status from that of legal residents to illegal residents. By 1986, the Bedoon were fully excluded from the same social and economic rights as Kuwaiti citizens.

Since 1986, the Kuwaiti government has refused to grant any form of documentation to the Bedoon, including birth certificates, death certificates, identity cards, marriage certificates, and driving licences. The Bedoon also face many restrictions in employment, travel and education. They are not permitted to educate their children in state schools and universities.

In 1995, Human Rights Watch reported that there were 300,000 stateless Bedoon, and this number was formally repeated by the British government.

According to several human rights organizations, the State of Kuwait is committing ethnic cleansing and genocide against the stateless Bedoon. In 1995, it was reported in the British parliament that the Al Sabah ruling family had deported 150,000 stateless Bedoon to refugee camps in the Kuwaiti desert near the Iraqi border with minimal water, insufficient food and no basic shelter, and that they were threatened with death if they returned to their homes in Kuwait City. As a result, many of the stateless Bedoon fled to Iraq, where they remain stateless people even today. The Kuwaiti government also stands accused of attempting to falsify their nationalities in official state documents. There have been reports of forced disappearances and mass graves of Bedoon.

The 1995 Human Rights Watch report stated:

"The totality of the treatment of the Bedoons amounts to a policy of denationalization of native residents, relegating them to an apartheid-like existence in their own country. The Kuwaiti government policy of harassment and intimidation of the Bedoons and of denying them the right to lawful residence, employment, travel and movement, contravene basic principles of human rights. Denial of citizenship to the Bedoons clearly violates international law. Denying Bedoons the right to petition the courts to challenge governmental decisions regarding their claims to citizenship and lawful residence in the country violates the universal right to due process of law and equality before the law."

British MP George Galloway stated:

"Of all the human rights atrocities committed by the ruling family in Kuwait, the worst and the greatest is that against the people known as the Bedoons. There are more than 300,000 Bedoons—one third of Kuwait's native population. Half of them—150,000—have been driven into refugee camps in the desert across the Iraqi border by the regime and left there to bake and to rot. The other 150,000 are treated not as second-class or even fifth-class citizens, but not as any sort of citizen. They are bereft of all rights. It is a scandal that almost no one in the world cares a thing about the plight of 300,000 people, 150,000 of them cast out of the land in which they have lived [when] many have lived in the Kuwaiti area for many centuries."

By 2004, the Bedoon accounted for only 40% of the Kuwaiti Army, a major reduction from their presence in the 1970s and 1980s. In 2013, the UK government estimated that there were 110,729 "documented" Bedoon in Kuwait, without giving a total estimate, but noting that all stateless individuals in Kuwait remain at risk of persecution and human rights breaches. The Bedoon are generally categorized into three groups: stateless tribespeople, stateless police/military and the stateless children of Kuwaiti women who married Bedoon men. According to the Kuwaiti government, there are only 93,000 "documented" Bedoon in Kuwait. In 2018, the Kuwaiti government claimed that it would naturalize up to 4,000 stateless Bedoon per year but this is considered unlikely. In 2019, the Iranian embassy in Kuwait announced that it offers Iranian citizenship to stateless Bedoon of Iranian ancestry.

In recent years, the rate of suicide among Bedoon has risen sharply.

=== Demographic engineering ===
The State of Kuwait formally has an official Nationality Law that grants non-nationals a legal pathway to obtaining citizenship. However, as access to citizenship in Kuwait is autocratically controlled by the Al Sabah ruling family it is not subject to any external regulatory supervision. The naturalization provisions within the Nationality Law are arbitrarily implemented and lack transparency. The lack of transparency prevents non-nationals from receiving a fair opportunity to obtain citizenship. Consequently, the Al Sabah ruling family have been able to manipulate naturalization for politically motivated reasons. In the three decades after independence in 1961, the Al Sabah ruling family naturalized hundreds of thousands of foreign Bedouin immigrants predominantly from Saudi Arabia. By 1980, as many as 200,000 immigrants were naturalized in Kuwait. Throughout the 1980s, the Al Sabah's politically motivated naturalization policy continued. The naturalizations were not regulated nor sanctioned by Kuwaiti law. The exact number of naturalizations is unknown but it is estimated that up to 400,000 immigrants were unlawfully naturalized in Kuwait. The foreign Bedouin immigrants were mainly naturalized to alter the demographic makeup of the citizen population in a way that made the power of the Al Sabah ruling family more secure. As a result of the politically motivated naturalizations, the number of naturalized citizens exceeds the number of Bedoon in Kuwait. The Al Sabah ruling family actively encouraged foreign Bedouin immigrants to migrate to Kuwait. The Al Sabah ruling family favored naturalizing Bedouin immigrants because they were considered loyal to the ruling family, unlike the politically active Palestinian, Lebanese, and Syrian expats in Kuwait. The naturalized citizens were predominantly Sunni Saudi immigrants from southern tribes. Accordingly, none of the stateless Bedoon in Kuwait belong to the Ajman tribe.

The Kuwaiti judicial system's lack of authority to rule on citizenship further complicates the Bedoon crisis, leaving Bedoon no access to the judiciary to present evidence and plead their case for citizenship. Although non-nationals constitute 70% of Kuwait's total population the Al Sabah ruling family persistently denies citizenship to most non-nationals, including those who fully satisfy the requirements for naturalization as stipulated in the state's official Nationality Law. According to unofficial estimates, 60-80% of Kuwait's Bedoon are Shia Muslims and, as a result, it is widely believed that the Bedoon issue in Kuwait is sectarian in nature. The Kuwaiti authorities permit the forgery of hundreds of thousands of politically motivated naturalizations whilst simultaneously denying citizenship to the Bedoon. The politically motivated naturalizations were noted by the United Nations, political activists, scholars, researchers and even members of the Al Sabah family. It is widely considered a form of deliberate demographic engineering and has been likened to Bahrain's politically motivated naturalization policy. Within the GCC countries, politically-motivated naturalization policies are referred to as "political naturalization" (التجنيس السياسي).

=== Asylum seekers in Europe ===
A large number of stateless Bedoon regularly immigrate to Europe as asylum seekers. The United Kingdom is the most popular destination for Bedoom asylum seekers. According to the Home Office, Kuwait is the eighth largest source of asylum seekers crossing the English Channel on small boats.

== Terrorism funding ==
In March 2014, David S. Cohen, then Under Secretary of the Treasury for Terrorism and Financial Intelligence, accused Kuwait of funding terrorism. Since the end of the Gulf War in 1991, accusations of Kuwait funding terrorism have been very common and come from a wide variety of sources including intelligence reports, Western government officials, scholarly research, and renowned journalists. From 2014 to 2015, Kuwait was frequently described as the world's biggest source of terrorism funding, particularly for ISIS and Al-Qaeda. On 26 June 2015, a suicide bombing took place at a Shia Muslim mosque in Kuwait. The Islamic State of Iraq and the Levant claimed responsibility for the attack. Twenty-seven people were killed and 227 people were wounded. In the aftermath, a lawsuit was filed accusing the Kuwaiti government of negligence and direct responsibility for the terror attack.

== Individual rights ==
=== Gun control ===
In February 2005, in the wake of a wave of Al-Qaeda violence, the government passed a law giving police wide powers to search for and seize illegal weapons. There was a similar law in 1992 to deal with a jump in gun ownership after the 1990 invasion of Kuwait. Lawmakers refused to extend that law in 1994, arguing that possession of weapons was a right.

== Banking and finance ==
=== Stock-market bailout ===
Al-Qallaf criticized the government's October 2008 stock-market bailout, alleging that it short-changed small investors and reasoning that the bailout money would be better spent on social allowances for the masses.

== Corruption ==
=== Kuwait Airways investigation ===
On September 9, 2007, Kuwait Airways' board of directors, headed by ruling family member Sheikh Talal Mubarak al-Sabah, resigned following differences with the government over a multibillion-dollar deal to buy new aircraft. In July, Al-Awadi had accused the corporation of squandering public funds and led the government to approve a recommendation by an inquiry committee, which called for top airline executives to be referred to the public prosecutor over alleged financial and administrative irregularities.

=== Falcon smuggling ===
On April 17, 2007, Al-Harbash and other politicians submitted documents to the government claiming that several falcon shipments for "influential people" had been imported recently without proper testing. Kuwait banned bird imports as an avian influenza precaution, but the ban was eased since July 2006. Al-Harbash sees the smuggling as an example of corruption that puts the country at risk for bird flu: "Lifting the ban on falcons was a catastrophe. Why were they exempted from the ban despite warnings by doctors?" Al-Harbash says he will ask the health committee to study the situation and report back.

Kuwait reported 20 birds, including 18 falcons, were tested positive for the deadly H5N1 strain of the bird flu on February 25 and so far the bird flu cases have risen to 132. In November 2005, Kuwait detected the first case of a bird infected with the H5N1 strain—a flamingo at a seaside villa.

=== FIFA reforms ===
On February 8, 2008, Al-Ghanim, as head of the Youth and Sports Committee, agreed to reform the Kuwaiti football program in line with the recommendations of FIFA.

In November 2007, FIFA had suspended Kuwait from all international matches because of governmental interference in the national football program. The dispute originated with Kuwait's October 9 elections for key posts in the country's soccer federation. FIFA and the Asian Football Confederation (AFC) refused to recognise the polls. FIFA said Kuwait had ignored the two bodies' "road map" of reforms requiring them to set up an interim board to organize fresh elections and draft new guidelines to prevent governmental interference in the game.

== Oil industry ==
=== Project Kuwait ===
Project Kuwait is a $7 billion, 25-year plan, first formulated in 1997 by the SPC, to increase the country's oil production (and to help compensate for declines at the mature Burgan field), with the help of international oil companies. In particular, Kuwait aims to increase output at five northern oil fields (Abdali, Bahra, Ratqa, Raudhatain, and Sabriya) from their current rate of around 650,000 barrels per day (103,000 m^{3}/d) to 900,000 barrels per day (140,000 m^{3}/d) within three years.

Al-Sane opposes Project Kuwait and allowing foreign oil companies into Kuwait. On December 23, 2005, Al-Sane told the press that he opposed the entry of these foreign companies because it is barred by the constitution: "The step the government wants to take is against the law, and we have to stand against it strongly... The constitutional issue is the main one. We're not against foreign investments, but the problem is that you have to stick to the constitution."
