= Migrant workers in Kuwait =

Migrant workers in Kuwait constitute a significant proportion of the population.

Foreign nationals make up 60% of the population and 78% of the labor force in Kuwait.

Kuwait's economy is highly dependent on foreign labor. To facilitate the recruitment of migrants, the country has signed memorandum of understanding and agreements with South and Southeast Asia, as well as some African countries, among others. The sponsorship system known as Kafala is almost the only way to recruit migrant workers. It is also used to strictly monitor migrant workers, who mainly work in the construction and domestic sectors. Access to justice remains difficult for migrants in Kuwait. The COVID-19 pandemic has further increased migrants' vulnerability to deportation, mistreatment, and health problems as the Kuwaiti economy has fallen into a deep recession due to the drop in oil prices. In 2020, government efforts to nationalize the labor force increased sharply, as did migrant repatriations. Another problem is statelessness. Kuwait has not signed the 1951 Refugee Convention and does not have an asylum system.

== Kafeel sponsorship system ==
Kuwait's foreign worker sponsorship system mandates that expatriates must be sponsored by a local employer to get a work permit. In August 2008, MP Abdullah Al-Roumi declared that he was going to draft a law to scrap Kuwait's "kafeel" foreign worker sponsorship system: "The government should be the only kafeel... We have scores of bachelors residing in Kuwait with an equal number of crimes. Many are caused due to the 'trading with humans' issue which taints the reputation of Kuwait." The government is currently planning to scrap the 'sponsorship system' in favor of a new system will be implemented to allow the expatriate workers to transfer their residence permits to the Ministry of Social Affairs and Labor. Deputy Prime Minister, Minister of Interior Lt Gen Sheikh Khaled Al-Jarrah announced an increase in the minimum salary which is 500KD for foreign workers if they want to sponsor a member of their family.

=== Minimum wage ===
In the parliamentary debates over the Kuwaiti minimum wage, MPs Askar Al-Enezi and Sadoon Al-Otaibi have dismissed past wage increases as “too small” and not enough to meet the steep hikes in consumer prices. On February 21, 2008, the parliament approved a 120 dinar ($440) monthly pay rise for nationals in the public and private sectors after inflation hit 7.3%, a 15-year high. It also decided to raise by 50 dinars ($183) the pay of foreigners employed by the government. In response, Al-Enezi said, “We reject this increase because it is well below expectations. We urge the government to review its decision."

The first Gulf Arab country to set a minimum wage for domestic servants was Kuwait. The large number of domestic workers urged the rest Gulf Arab countries to follow the approach taken by Kuwait to tackle widespread abuses. More specifically Kuwait on 2016 regulated the working conditions through legislation and rights groups. They listed the minimum salary as 60 Kuwaiti dinars ($198) a month, set out measures to implement a milestone law passed by parliament requiring employers to pay overtime for every extra hour worked. It grants maids the right to a week off, 30 days of paid annual leave, 12 hours of work with rest, and a one-month service charge allowance annually at the end of the contract.

== Anti-trafficking reform ==
In September 2008, MP Saleh Al-Mulla demanded from Minister of Social Affairs and Labor Bader Al-Duwailah a list of companies involved in human trafficking. Mulla also asked about the measures taken against the violating companies and other steps that would be taken in the future to prevent such violations from taking place.

In March 2013, Kuwait passed Law No. 91 of 2013 Combating Trafficking in Persons and Smuggling of Migrants that prohibits sex and labor trafficking and provides for penalties of up to 15 years in prison.

In 2016, Kuwait tried to fight trafficking in persons with the collaboration of UN Special Rapporteur on trafficking, Maria Grazia Giammarinaro who emphasized to further strengthen the assistance and support measures for domestic workers who are victims of trafficking and exploitation.

== Implementation of the jobs resettlement policy ==
Kuwait's foreign labor consists of 4.5 million residents, working in both blue collar and white collar jobs. Although the Kuwait government proposed in March 2018 the right to own property to expatriate workers, they faced problems in adapting to Kuwaiti society. Based on the decision of the Civil Service Commission No. 11 of 2017 by 2023 all foreign employees in the government would be replaced and all graduates under 30 years of age would not be recruited. The Kuwaiti government also claims that the proportion of Kuwaiti employees in banks will increase by 80% by the end of 2018.

2018 was the first year of implementation of the jobs resettlement policy in which more than 3 thousand job contracts of foreigners in government agencies had been cancelled and approximately 13,000 expatriates have been deported from Kuwaiti Interior Ministry with accusations of poor health conditions, labor law violations and criminal charges.

Since the advent of COVID-19, oil prices have been plummeted, and local jobs have been erased, so in 2020 the Kuwaiti government was considering the possibility of deportation regardless of age and health problems, approximately 460.000 Indians and 260.000 Egyptians, the two largest communities of expatriates. More than 5000 migrants from Bangladesh left Kuwait also during this period. Another victim of the Kuwaiti government's deportation order was the Nepali migrants who faced hard times in the labor camps because of undernourishment and restriction of various social services.

Sri Lanka made an effort with its network of 67 missions, the help of the local community and religious organisations enabled the provision of food and medicine to its expatriates as well as facilitating their repatriation and the transfer of bank savings.

On January 18, 2021, the Kuwait government allowed the entry of domestic workers from countries such as the Philippines, India, Sri Lanka and others, but there was no particular response especially from the Indian population as fewer and fewer were taking up such jobs. The situation in Kuwait continues to this day with the police taking strict measures against the illegal stay of expatriates in the country. Finally a major blow is the replacement of more than 38,000 expatriates working in the health sector as this industry is growing for Kuwait.

== Blacklist for those who mistreat foreign workers ==
On October 2, 2007, Waleed Al-Tabtabaie called for the interior ministry to draw up a blacklist of employers who mistreat their domestic helpers and urged stiff penalties for physical abuse. Al-Tabtabaie said that employers who abuse their maids "physically or morally" should be added to the blacklist and prevented from hiring new maids. Al-Tabtabie, a member of parliament's human rights panel, argued that the phenomenon of maid abuse "has lately increased to a disturbing level and a large number of abuses are committed annually, with most cases failing to reach the court."

In September 2007, Kuwait opened a temporary shelter to house runaway maids until their disputes with employers are resolved. The Kuwaiti government plans to open two permanent centres for males and females to be housed separately.

== 2018 Kuwait–Philippine diplomatic crisis ==
In February 2018, the body of Filipino migrant worker, 28-year-old Joanna Demafelis, was located, found in an apartment her employers, married couple Nader Essam Assaf and Mona Hassoun. There was evidence she'd been tortured before she was strangled to death and forensic evidence determined it was likely she'd died more than a year before her body was discovered. When news of her murder reached the media, Assaf, a Lebanese national, and Hassoun successfully fled Kuwait but were ultimately arrested in Syria. A little over a month after their arrests, Assaf confessed he'd murdered Demafelis and both he and his wife were sentenced to death by hanging. Though Kuwaiti authorities responded quickly in apprehending the people responsible for Demafelis' murder and sentenced the both of them to death, the incident ignited outrage in the Philippines and prompted President Rodrigo Duterte to ban Filipino citizens from working Kuwait, resulting in what would become known as the 2018 Kuwait–Philippine diplomatic crisis. Because of this incident they were given to 10,000 Filipinos a free flight home from the Philippine government. The Kuwait–Philippine diplomatic crisis has caused further problems of mistreatment of Filipino migrants as some of them tried to enter Kuwait through illegal routes.

Home to more than 250,000 migrant workers from the Philippines, approximately 60% of whom work in domestic labor, and Kuwait is a top source of remittance for the Philippines. Despite the commonness of Filipino nationals traveling to Kuwait to work, the conditions of migrant workers has been of concern for human rights organisations and the Filipino government for some time, with reports of Filipinos being enslaved, sexually abused, and murdered by their employers or residents in the Persian Gulf. Not wanting to lose its Filipino workforce, the Kuwaiti government passed legislation in May 2018 requiring employers to allow Filipino migrant workers the right to possess their own passport, the right to a 12-hour work day with a one-hour break and one day off per week, an end-of-the-year bonus, and access to a working cell phone. Following the meeting between the Director General of the Kuwait Public Authority for Manpower (PAM) and the Charge d'Affaires of the Philippines in November 2022, the future for Filipino migrants working in Kuwait looks bright as Kuwait is interested in recruiting more Filipinos who form a large part of the Kuwaiti workforce.

== See also ==
- Human rights in Kuwait
