= Abdul Latif =

- Gender: Male
- Language: Arabic

Abdul Latif (Arabic: عبد اللطيف, romanized: ʻAbd al-Laṭīf) is a Muslim male given name and, in modern usage, surname. It is built from the Arabic words ʻabd and al-Laṭīf, one of the names of God in the Qur'an, which gave rise to the Muslim theophoric names. It means "servant of the All-gentle".

The letter ''a'' of the ''al-'' is unstressed, and can be transliterated by almost any vowel, often by ''e''. So the first part can appear as Abdel, Abdul or Abd-al. The second part may appear as Latif, Lateef or in other ways. The whole name is subject to variable spacing and hyphenation.

The surname is used by Muslims and also by Orthodox Christians in Lebanon.

It may refer to:

== People ==
=== Given name ===
- Abd al-Latif al-Baghdadi (medieval writer) (1162–1231), Iraqi physician, historian, Egyptologist and traveller
- Abd al-Latif ibn Muhammad Taraghay Ulughbek (ca. 1420–1450), Timurid ruler of Transoxiana
- Ghabdellatif of Kazan (born c. 1475), khan of Kazan Khanate, 1496–1502
- Shah Abdul Latif Kazmi, known as Bari Imam (1617–1705), Indian Sufi
- Shah Abdul Latif Bhittai (1689–1752), Sindhi Sufi scholar, mystic, saint, poet, and musician
- Nawab Abdul Latif (1828–1893), Bengali educator and social worker
- Sahibzada Abdul Latif (1853–1903), Afghan executed for heresy
- Abdullah Abdul Latif Al Othman (1895–1965), Kuwaiti businessman
- Abdul Latif Tibawi (1910–1981), Palestinian historian
- Abdul Latif Chowdhury, known as Saheb Qibla Fultali (1913–2008), Bangladeshi Islamic scholar
- Abdel Latif Boghdadi (politician) (1917–1999), Egyptian politician, air force officer, and judge
- Abdul Latif (musician) (1927–2005), Bangladeshi musician
- Abdellatif Filali (1928–2009), Moroccan politician and diplomat
- Abdul Latif Dayfallah (born 1930), Yemeni politician
- Abdel Latif El Zein (born 1932), Lebanese politician
- Abdul Latif Galadari (born 1939), Emirati Businessman
- Abdul Latif Hakimi, Afghan, Taliban spokesman
- Abdul Latif (cricketer) (1939–2026), Pakistani cricketer and cricket administrator in Bangladesh
- Abdul Latief (Indonesian businessman) (born 1940), businessman and politician
- Abdellatif Laabi (born 1942), Moroccan poet
- Abdul Latif Afridi (born 1943), Pakistani lawyer
- Abdul Latif Siddiqui (born 1943), Bangladeshi politician
- Abdul Latif Rashid (born 1944), Iraqi politician; current President of Iraq
- Abdul Latif Sharif (1947–2006), Egyptian-American convicted of rape and murder
- Abdul-Latif Ali al-Mayah (ca. 1949–2004), Iraqi academic and politician
- Abdul Latif (footballer), Abdul Latif Baloch (fl. 1976–1984), Pakistani midfielder
- Ǧamīl ʿAbdu 'l-Laṭīf al-Bannāʾ, or just Jamil al-Banna (born 1952), Jordanian arrested in Gambia, now a refugee in Britain
- Jamaal Abdul-Lateef (born 1953), American basketball player better known as Jamaal Wilkes
- Abdul Latif (restaurateur) (1954–2008), Bangladeshi-British curry house owner
- Abdellatif Abdelhamid (born 1954), Syrian film director
- Abdüllatif Şener (born 1954), Turkish politician
- Abdullatif bin Rashid Al Zayani (born 1955), fifth Gulf Cooperation Council (GCC) Secretary General
- Abdou Latif Guèye (1956–2008), Senegalese politician
- Abdellatif Kechiche (born 1960), Tunisian actor and film director
- Abdul Latif Pedram (born 1963), Afghan politician
- Abdul Latif Nasir (born 1965), Moroccan held in Guantanamo
- Abdulatif Al-Ameeri (born 1966), Kuwaiti politician
- Yahya Abd-al-Latif Ayyash, known as Yahya Ayyash (1966–1996), Palestinian Hamas fighter
- Abdelatif Benazzi (born 1968), Moroccan-French Rugby footballer
- Abdellatif Jrindou (born 1974), Moroccan footballer
- Walid Salah Abdel Latif (born 1977), Egyptian footballer
- Abdelatif Chemlal (born 1982), Moroccan runner
- Abdellatif Meftah (born 1982), Moroccan-French runner
- Abdellatif Boutaty (born 1983), Moroccan Rugby footballer
- Abdel Latif Ahmed (born 1983), Egyptian volleyball player
- Abdelatif Bahdari (born 1984), Palestinian footballer
- Abdulatif Al-Ghanam (born 1985), Saudi footballer
- Ismaeel Abdullatif (born 1986), Bahraini footballer
- Abdul-Latif Salifu (born 1990), Ghanaian footballer
- Faysal Abd al-Latif al-Shaabi, or just Faysal al-Shaabi (died 1971), South Yemen politician
- Abdul Lateef (Fijian lawyer) (died 2008), lawyer and politician
- Abdel Latif Moussa (died 2009), Palestinian religious and political activist
- Abdul Latif Ahmadi, Afghan film director
- Ahmed Abd Ellatif
- Wael Abdul Latif, Iraqi politician
- M.Abdul Lathief, Indian politician in Tamil Nadu
- Abdul Latiff Ahmad, Malaysian politician
- Abdul Latif Ibrahimi, Afghan politician
- Abdul Latif (Pakistani politician), Member of the National Assembly of Pakistan from Chitral (2024–2029)
- Abdul Latif (Bangladeshi politician) (died 2001)
- Sheikh Abdul Latif, Indian footballer
- Abdul Latif (criminal) (1951–1997), Indian underworld don
- Abdul Latif (Indian politician) (1912–1991)

=== Other ===
- Jumah Mohammed Abdul Latif Al Dossari, or just Juma al-Dossary, Bahraini held in Guantanamo
- Leila Abdul-Latif, Iraqi politician
- Mohd Zakry Abdul Latif, Malaysian badminton player
- Osama Abdul Latif, Sudanese businessman
- Siti Fauziah Sheikh Abdul Latiff, or just Fauziah Latiff (born 1970), Malaysian singer and actress
