= Abdulatif Al-Ameeri =

Member of the Kuwaiti National Assembly

Abdulatif AlـAmeeri
- Born: 1966 (age 59–60)
- Occupation: Politician
- Known for: Member of the Kuwaiti National Assembly

Abdulatif AlـAmeeri is a member of the Kuwaiti National Assembly, representing the second district. Born in 1966, Al-Ameeri studied sharia law at Kuwait University and worked as a lawyer before being elected to the National Assembly in 2008. While political parties are technically illegal in Kuwait, Al-Ameeri affiliates with the Islamist Hadas party.

== Against Forgiving Iraq's Debt ==
Al-Ameeri opposes forgiving Iraq's debt. The debt, estimated at $16 billion, represents loans Kuwait made to Baghdad in the Saddam Hussein era, mostly during the 1980-1988 Iraq-Iran war. Al-Ameeri argues that, "The debt owed by Iraq to Kuwait is the right of the Kuwaiti people and no one has the right to negotiate over them." Al-Ameeri believes that the Kuwaiti voices calling to forgive the debt and compensation "should not be heeded and they do not represent the Kuwaiti people." He further opposes the debt forgiveness because Iraq has considerable oil wealth and because the, "Kuwaiti people shed their blood" during the 1990 Iraqi invasion of Kuwait. "The issue is a red line for Kuwait and no Kuwaiti will ever concede these loans," Al-Ameeri has been quoted as saying.

== Criticism of Cabinet Appointments ==
On August 23, 2008, Al-Ameeri told Al-Wasat, "There are some incompetent ministers in the Cabinet who are neither contributing to the development of the country nor to the government... These ministers are not fulfilling their duties towards the country." Speaking to Al-Wasat daily, the lawmaker called for amending second article of the Constitution, saying "this article is preventing the country's growth in all sectors."

Speaking about the fourth refinery project, Al-Ameeri ruled out reports about Al-Salafi group's special interests in the project and accused authorities of neglecting the project "which will benefit all Kuwaitis."

Al-Ameeri is against the appointment of women in the police force and hinted that their presence in police stations could lead to immoral activities.

The lawmaker is working on a draft bill that calls for restricting appointments at the top level. "The country suffers when everybody appoints his relatives in the most sensitive posts," he noted.

The lawmaker denies that extremist ideology is included in school syllabus and warned public from entering debates on such topics "because the education sector has no clear strategy."

He said he will support Hassan Johar in grilling Minister of Education and Higher Education Nuriya Al-Subaih, if she fails to answer his questions and refuted reports that the Al-Salafi group entered into a deal with the government. Al-Ameeri also finds the establishment of an Islamist bloc 'unnecessary' now "as it lost power in the last Parliament."

== Opposed to Grilling of Prime Minister ==
In November 2008, Waleed Al-Tabtabaie, Mohammed Al-Mutair and Mohammed Hayef Al-Mutairi filed a request to grill Prime Minister Nasser Mohammed Al-Ahmed Al-Sabah for allowing Iranian Shiite cleric Mohammad Baqir al-Fali to enter Kuwait despite a legal ban. Al-Ameeri criticized this move, arguing that MPs should not start questioning the Prime Minister so soon after getting elected. Al-Ameeri further argued that, “The government should be given enough time to execute its agenda and plans...The relations between executive and legislative authorities should not deteriorate due to the personal agenda of one or two MPs.”
