= Hussain al-Qallaf =

Kuwaiti politician (born 1958)

MP Hussain Al Qallaf Al Bahrani النائب حسين القلاف

Member of the National Assembly of Kuwait for The First District
- Incumbent
- Assumed office 1996
- Majority: 7274

Personal details
- Born: October 22, 1958 (age 67)
- Website: alqallaf.org

Hussain Ali Alsayyid Khalifa Hussain al-Qallaf (Arabic:حسين علي السيد خليفة حسين القلاف) is a former member of the Kuwaiti National Assembly, representing the first district. Born in 1958, Al-Qallaf studied Sharia law before being elected to the National Assembly in 1996. While political parties are technically illegal in Kuwait, Al-Qallaf affiliates with the Shia deputies.

== Views ==
On June 18, 2008, Al-Qallaf criticized Education Minister Nouriya Al-Subaih for not wearing the hijab, telling the Arab Times, "It is difficult to comprehend the new Cabinet as it consists of ministers with opposing views, including two women who refused to comply with the dress code stipulated by the Constitution..."

Al-Qallaf criticized the government's October 2008 stock-market bailout, alleging that it short-changed small investors and reasoning that the bailout money would be better spent on social allowances for the masses.

On October 28, 2008, the parliament voted 50–7 to insure all types of deposits in all local banks within Kuwait. Al-Qallaf opposed the bill, along with Jabir Al-Azmi, Daifallah Bouramiya, Mohammed Al-Obaid, Mohammed Hayef Al-Mutairi, and Musallam Al-Barrak and Waleed Al-Tabtabaie. Al-Qallaf accused the Cabinet of speeding up the bill's passage for the benefit of monetary tycoons.

In November 2008, Waleed Al-Tabtabaie, Mohammed Al-Mutair and Mohammed Hayef Al-Mutairi filed a request to grill Prime Minister Nasser Al-Sabah for allowing prominent Iranian Shiite cleric Mohammad Baqir al-Fali to enter Kuwait despite a legal ban. On November 20, 2008, Al-Qallaf criticized this move as political gamesmanship, telling AFP, "This is a grilling by proxy and is a reflection of the dispute within the ruling family ... Some [MPs] have made themselves available as tools for ruling family members." In response to the grilling request, Al-Qallaf also called on the Emir to "suspend parliament and the constitution" in a bid to stop the political bickering.
