= National Democratic Alliance (Kuwait) =

Political bloc in Kuwait

National Democratic Alliance التحالف الوطني الديمقراطي
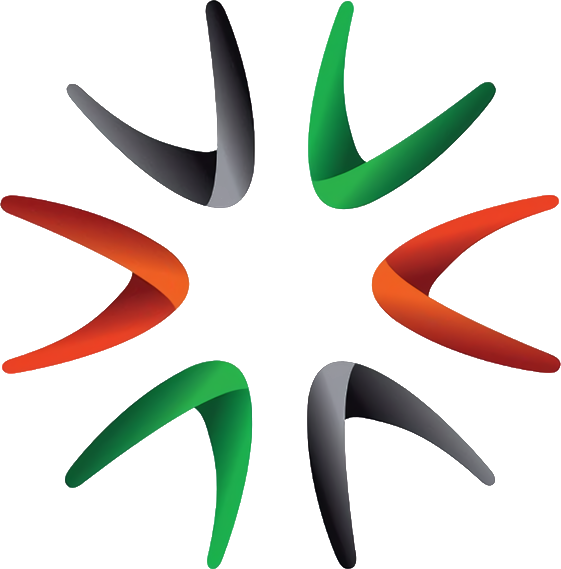
- Abbreviation: NDA
- Leader: Bashar Al-Sayegh
- Founded: 1992; 33 years ago
- Headquarters: Kuwait City
- Newspaper: Al-Jarida
- Ideology: National liberalism Secularism
- Political position: Centre-right

Website
- altahalof.org

The National Democratic Alliance (Arabic: التحالف الوطني الديمقراطي, romanized: Al-Tehalef Al-Watani Al-Demokrati) is a liberal political bloc in Kuwait.

== History and profile ==
Of the fifty elected members of Kuwait National Assembly in 2008, two belong to the NDA: Mohammed Al-Abduljader and Mohammed Al-Sager. MP Ali Al-Rashid originally affiliated with the NDA, but left the party on 23 November 2008. The party had around six MPs in the 50-seat Assembly in 2009.

The NDA encourages the empowerment of women and nationalism instead of groupings based on sect or social class. As of 2010, it was mostly supported by young Kuwaitis.

The NDA has also launched the TV channel Nabeeha Tahalof and publishes the daily newspaper Al-Jarida.
