= Ahmed Al-Sadoun =

Kuwaiti National Assembly speaker

Ahmed al-Sadoun
- أحمد السعدون
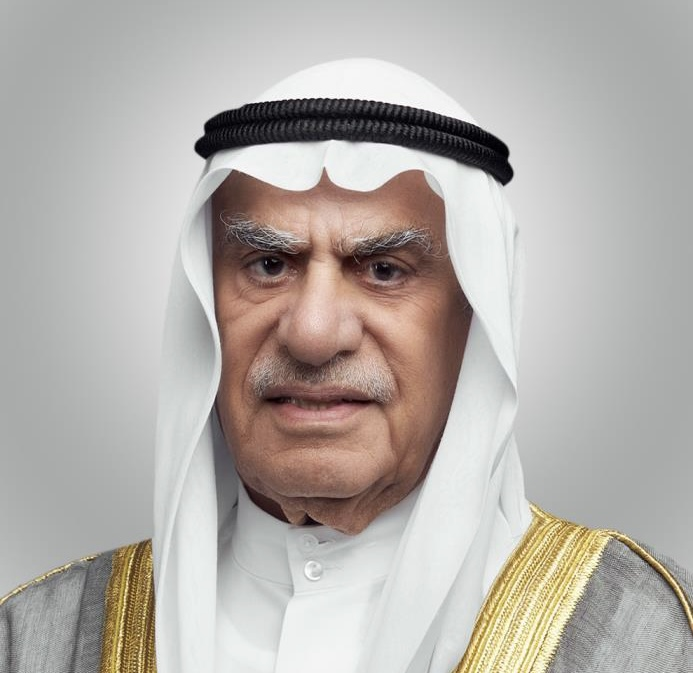
- Official portrait, 2022

Speaker of the Kuwait National Assembly
- In office June 20, 2023 – February 15, 2024
- Preceded by: Marzouq al-Ghanim
- In office October 18, 2022 – March 19, 2023
- Preceded by: Marzouq al-Ghanim
- Succeeded by: Marzouq al-Ghanim (Note: On March 19, 2023, the Constitutional Court annulled the 2022 legislative election and reinstated the National Assembly elected in 2020, of which al-Ghanim was Speaker.)
- In office February 15, 2012 – June 20, 2012
- Preceded by: Jassem al-Kharafi
- Succeeded by: Jassem al-Kharafi (Note: On June 20, 2012, the Constitutional Court annulled the 2012 legislative election and reinstated the National Assembly elected in 2009, of which al-Kharafi was Speaker.)
- In office October 20, 1992 – May 4, 1999
- Preceded by: Himself (Note: Al-Sadoun was Speaker on July 3, 1986 when the National Assembly was indefinitely dissolved. He returned to power after the first constitutionally-mandated election was held in 1992.)
- Succeeded by: Jassem al-Kharafi
- In office March 9, 1985 – July 3, 1986
- Preceded by: Mohammad al-Adasani
- Succeeded by: None (Note: On July 3, 1986, the Emir suspended the Constitution and dissolved the National Assembly indefinitely. During Iraq's occupation of Kuwait and under intense international pressure, the Emir pledged to revive the National Assembly after Kuwait was liberated. As a result, Kuwait held a legislative election on October 5, 1992.)

Personal details
- Born: November 12, 1934 (age 91) Kuwait City, Sheikhdom of Kuwait
- Occupation: Real estate executive

Ahmed Abdulaziz al-Sadoun (Arabic: أحمد عبدالعزيز السعدون, born November 12, 1934) is a Kuwaiti politician and activist who was the Speaker of the Kuwaiti National Assembly from June 20, 2023 to February 15, 2024. He was previously the speaker from 1985 to 1999, from February 2012 until it was declared that the February 2012 elections were invalid and from October 2022 until it was declared in March 2023 that the September 2022 elections were invalid. He is the leader of the oppositional Popular Action Bloc in the Assembly and served for eight terms.

He represented the third district. Al-Sadoun worked in the ministry of communication before being elected to the National Assembly in 1975.

Al-Sadoun is a real estate executive.

== Personal information and career ==
He is the youngest of his family born to his father Abdulaziz Jassem al-Sadoun and mother Madhawi al-Rikada. He has 12 brothers and sisters. Al-Sadoun is Married with six children: two boys (Abdulaziz and Mohammed) and four girls (Widad, Ghada, Shaikha and Dalal). He is one of the founders of Kazma Sporting Club in 1964 and secretary until 1968 and then the president of Kuwait Football Association from 1968 to 1976 and vice president of FIFA from 1974 to 1982.

- Home City: Khaldiya, Kuwait
- Religious Views: Sunni Islam
- Candidate member: since 1967
- Elected Member: since 1975
- Elected Member for: 13 terms 1975, 1981, 1985, 1992, 1996, 1999, 2003, 2006, 2008, 2009, 2012, 2022, 2023 and 2024
- Speaker of Kuwait National Assembly: 1985, 1992, 1996, 2012, 2022 and 2023
- Political Orientation: Leader of the Takatul al-Nawwab (1992) and of the Popular Action Bloc (1999, 2012)

== Allegations of profiteering ==
On May 28, 2007, the National Assembly formed an in-house investigation panel to look into allegations that al-Sadoun and Mohammed Al-Sager used their influence to make money. The seven-member panel examined claims that Al-Sadoun gave information he garnered from a parliamentary question to his son, helping the company the son worked in to win a business contract.

== Oil reforms ==
On June 14, 2008, al-Sadoun and three other MPs filed a bill prohibiting annual oil output from exceeding one percent of proven reserves. The bill also required the state to disclose the emirate's actual proven reserves. Government reports declared Kuwait's reserves to be about 100 billion barrels (1.6×10^{10} m^{3}), though some reports said proven reserves could be as low as 24 billion barrels (3.8×10^{9} m^{3}). Kuwait had been producing just under one billion barrels per year, one percent of the official reserve figure. The bill would cut output by one quarter of the previous 2.55 million barrels (405,000 m^{3}).

Al-Sadoun broke from Kuwait's oil policies in opposing the entry of international oil companies (IOCs) into Kuwait.

== Protest against Israeli attacks ==
On December 28, 2008, al-Sadoun with fellow Kuwaiti lawmakers Mikhled Al-Azmi, Musallam Al-Barrak, Marzouq Al-Ghanim, Jamaan Al-Harbash, Ahmed Al-Mulaifi, Mohammed Hayef Al-Mutairi, Nasser Al-Sane, and Waleed Al-Tabtabaie protested in front of the National Assembly building against attacks by Israel on Gaza. Protesters burned Israeli flags, waved banners reading, "No to hunger, no to submission" and chanted "Allahu Akbar". Israel launched air strikes against Hamas in the Gaza Strip on December 26 after a six-month ceasefire ended on December 18.

== Notes ==
Political offices
Preceded by Mohammad Al-Adasani	Speaker of Kuwait National Assembly; 1985–1999	Succeeded by Jassem Al-Kharafi
Preceded by Jassem Al-Kharafi	Speaker of Kuwait National Assembly; 2012	Succeeded by Ali Al-Rashid
