= Ahmed Al-Mulaifi =

Kuwaiti politician (born 1956)

Ahmed Abdul Mohsen Turki Al-Mulaifi (Arabic: أحمد عبد المحسن تركي المليفي) is a former member of the Kuwaiti National Assembly representing the third district. Born in 1956, al-Mulaifi worked as a lawyer before being elected to the National Assembly in 1996.

== Dispute with Khalaf Al-Enezi ==
On September 4, 2008, MP Khalaf Al-Enezi denounced al-Mulaifi for criticizing Prime Minister Nasser Al-Mohammed Al-Sabah. Al-Mulaifi had attacked the Prime Minister for planning a trip to the United States and the United Nations at a time when "there are plenty of tense and complicated issues domestically."

== Protest against Israeli attacks ==
On December 28, 2008, al-Mulaifi with fellow Kuwaiti lawmakers Mikhled Al-Azmi, Musallam Al-Barrak, Marzouq Al-Ghanim, Jamaan Al-Harbash, Mohammed Hayef Al-Mutairi, Ahmed Al-Sadoun, Nasser Al-Sane, and Waleed Al-Tabtabaie protested in front of the National Assembly building against attacks by Israel on Gaza. Protesters burned Israeli flags, waved banners reading, "No to hunger, no to submission" and chanted "Allahu Akbar". Israel launched air strikes against Hamas in the Gaza Strip on December 26 after a six-month ceasefire ended on December 18.
