= Ali Mohammed Thunayan Al-Ghanim =

- علي ثنيان الغانم

Kuwait Chamber of Commerce and Industry

Chairman
- In office 2004–2020

Personal details
- Born: 1937 (age 88–89) Kuwait
- Citizenship: Kuwait
- Spouse: Faiza Al-Kharafi
- Children: Marzouq Al-Ghanim
- Education: Technical University of Hannover

Ali Mohammed Thunayan Al-Ghanim (Arabic: علي ثنيان الغانم, born 1937) is a Kuwaiti oligarch. He is the Vice Chairman of the Board of Directors of the Arab-British Chamber of Commerce, the German-Arab Chamber of Commerce, and Helarab Co. in Switzerland and serves on the board of Makerous Co. in Germany.

He was the Chairman of the Kuwait Chamber of Commerce and Industry (KCCI) from 2004 to 2020 (16 years). Previously, he served as KCCI Vice Chairman, and President of the Federation of Chambers of the Gulf Cooperation Council (GCC).

In 1961, Al-Ghanim founded the Ali Alghanim & Sons Company, which is a group of companies with trading activities extending to automotive sales and services, civil and mechanical contracting, structural steel fabrication and construction, carpentry, and hotel ownership.

== Education ==
He holds a diploma in Mechanical Engineering from the Technical University of Hannover. He speaks three languages, Arabic, German and English.

== Personal life ==
He is married to Faiza Mohammed Al-Kharafi, who was the president of Kuwait University from 1993 to 2002, and the first woman to head a major university in the Middle East. Faiza is heir to the M. A. Kharafi & Sons business group.

They have 5 children, 3 sons and 2 daughters. Their eldest son is Marzouq Al-Ghanim who is a former speaker of the Kuwait National Assembly.

== Board Roles ==
- Chairman of the Kuwait Sporting Club (1980-1992)
- Vice Chairman of the Board of Directors of the Public Authority for Industry (1963-1969)
- Vice-Chairman of the Board of Directors of the Social Security Corporation
- Member of the Board of Directors of the Kuwait Chamber of Commerce and Industry in 1984
- Vice Chairman of the Kuwait Chamber of Commerce and Industry in 2000
- Chairman of the Kuwait Chamber of Commerce and Industry (2004-2020)
- Honorary President of the Chambers of the Gulf Cooperation Council
- Former Chairman of the Board of Directors of Aayan Company
