= Politics of Kuwait =

Kuwait is an emirate in the Persian Gulf region with an autocratic political system. The Emir of Kuwait, a hereditary monarch from the Al Sabah ruling family appoints the prime minister (who is always a royal) and other members of government, as well as members of judicial, police and financial institutions.

Kuwait is a wealthy rentier state.

In contrast to other autocracies in the Gulf region, Kuwaiti politics has historically been more liberal, as citizens have more substantial civic and political rights. Kuwaitis vote in elections, criticize officials, and regularly organize protests. Kuwaiti civil society criticizes the corruption and opulence of the royal government. There is nominally elected parliament that frequently clashes with the royal government. The parliament has frequently been dissolved by the royal government, most recently in 2024.

== Constitution ==
The Constitution of Kuwait was ratified in 1962 and has elements of a presidential and parliamentary system of government. The Emir is the head of state, whose powers are listed in the constitution.

== Executive branch ==
The Constitution of Kuwait was promulgated in 1962.

=== Government ===
The prime minister is appointed by the unelected head of state (Emir of Kuwait). The prime minister chooses the cabinet of ministers (government).

=== Emir ===
The Emir's powers are defined by the 1961 constitution. These powers include appointing the prime minister, who in turn chooses the cabinet (government). Upon the death of the Emir, the crown prince succeeds.

Power in Kuwait has traditionally been balanced between the Emir — particularly under Mubarak — and the merchant class. Mubarak effectively built the modern Kuwaiti state, establishing the tax system, trade levies, a customs administration, and the provision of social services. Political institutions were built in Kuwait in large part due to exit vetoes exercised by merchants on Mubarak. The acquiescence of the merchants and the broader population to the rule of the Emir and the Sabah family was due to a division of monopoly rents: the Sabah family, through the state, to control the oil industry, and the merchants to dominate other industries. The public at large was given social services from education to health care, funded by oil wealth. This arrangement has allowed the ruling family "to maintain power without making substantial political concessions."

== Judicial branch ==
The judiciary in Kuwait is not independent of the government, the Emir appoints all the judges and many judges are foreign nationals from Egypt. In each administrative district of Kuwait, there is a Summary Court (also called Courts of First Instance which are composed of one or more divisions, like a Traffic Court or an Administrative Court); then there is Court of Appeals; Cassation Court, and lastly - a Constitutional Court which interprets the constitution and deals with disputes related to the constitutionality of laws. Kuwait has a civil law legal system.

== Legislative branch ==
Legislative power is exercised by the Emir of Kuwait. It was formerly exercised by the National Assembly.

== Ministries ==
- Minister of Interior
- Minister of Commerce and Industry
- Minister of Defense
- Minister of Education
- Minister of Electricity, Water and Renewable Energy
- Minister of Finance
- Minister of Foreign Affairs
- Minister of Health
- Minister of Higher Education and Scientific Research
- Minister of Information and Culture
- Ministry of Awqaf and Islamic Affairs
- Minister of Justice
- Minister of Oil
- Minister of Public Works
- Minister of Social Affairs, Family and Childhood Affairs
- Minister of State for Cabinet Affairs
- Minister of State for Communication and Information Technology
- Minister of State for Development and Sustainability Affairs
- Minister of State for Economic and Investment Affairs
- Minister of State for Municipal Affairs
- Minister of State for Housing Affairs
- Minister of State for Youth and Sport Affairs
- Minister of Information

== Opinion polls ==
A 2024 Arab Barometer opinion poll found as most common political issues included corruption, inflation, laws, and public services.

== See also ==
- Government of Kuwait
- History of Kuwait
- Political issues in Kuwait
