= Mohammed Hayef al-Mutairi =

Kuwaiti politician

Mohammed Hayef Sultan Areej Al-Mutairi (Arabic: محمد هايف سلطان عريج المطيري) is a Kuwaiti politician and member of the Kuwaiti National Assembly representing the fourth district. Born in 1964, Al-Mutairi studied Islamic studies and served in the Kuwait Municipality before being elected to the National Assembly in 2008. Al-Mutairi affiliates with Islamist deputies.

== Political career ==
=== Guaranteeing bank deposits opposition ===
On October 28, 2008, the parliament voted 50–7 to insure all types of deposits in all local banks within Kuwait. Al-Mutairi opposed the bill, along with Jabir Al-Azmi, Hussein Al-Qallaf Al-Bahraini, Daifallah Bouramiya, Mohammed Al-Obaid, Musallam Al-Barrak and Waleed Al-Tabtabaie. Al-Mutairi accused the Cabinet of speeding up the bill's passage for the benefit of monetary tycoons.

=== Request to grill Prime Minister Nasser ===
In November 2008, Al-Mutairi joined with fellow Islamist MPs Waleed Al-Tabtabaie and Mohammed Al-Mutair in filing a request to grill Prime Minister Nasser Al-Mohammed Al-Sabah for allowing prominent Iranian Shiite cleric Mohammad Baqir al-Fali to enter Kuwait despite a legal ban. The ban was later repealed by the statewide court-system.

=== Protest against Israeli attacks ===
On December 28, 2008, al-Mutairi with fellow Kuwaiti lawmakers Mikhled Al-Azmi, Musallam Al-Barrak, Marzouq Al-Ghanim, Jamaan Al-Harbash, Ahmed Al-Mulaifi, Ahmed Al-Sadoun, Nasser Al-Sane, and Waleed Al-Tabtabaie protested in front of the National Assembly building against attacks by Israel on Gaza. Protesters burned Israeli flags, waved banners reading, "No to hunger, no to submission" and chanted "Allahu Akbar". Israel launched air strikes against Hamas in the Gaza Strip on December 26 after a six-month ceasefire ended on December 18.
