= Hassan Jawhar =

Kuwaiti politician

Hasan Johar (born 1960) is a member of the Kuwaiti National Assembly, representing the first district. He is a Kuwaiti of Iranian descent.

Johar obtained at PhD in political science from Florida State University and worked as a professor at Kuwait University before being elected to the National Assembly in 1996.

== Support of citizenship for bidun ==
On December 4, 2008, Johar, Musallam Al-Barrak, Marzouq Al-Hubaini, Ali Al-Deqbasi, and Abdullah Al-Barghash submitted a draft law calling for the granting of Kuwaiti citizenship to all bidun (stateless) residents in the country. The bill proposes that citizenship be granted to all bidun who were included in the 1965 census and who have no criminal record. The new draft law differs from previous bills as it does not impose any restrictions on the naturalization of bidun and does not set a ceiling for the number of bidun that can be granted citizenship. They also suggested that the families of individuals who have died in service to the country be naturalized. In addition, the lawmakers affirmed their belief that the families of POWs and the children of those who were martyred during the invasion be granted citizenship. The latest statistics reveal that more than 80,000 bidun currently reside in Kuwait.

== Opposition to changes to textbooks ==
Amid rumors that the Kuwaiti government was going to change its textbooks to remove possible references to religion and extremism, Johar said, "I hope the government will not bow to external blackmail and threats ... and be forced to delete important sections of Islamic education." According to Jawhar, the decision to rewrite textbooks came despite findings by specialist committees that current editions contain no references calling for violence and fanaticism or encouraging struggle against other religions. The committees found that those books contained sizable portions focusing on tolerance, brotherhood, equality, passion, cooperation and respect for the rights of non-Muslims.

== Support for women's suffrage ==
Johar supported Kuwaiti women's right to vote, saying "By relating to Islam I can see—and I also consulted a lot of experts in this regard—that there is no contradiction between the women's vote and our Islamic values."

== Grilling of Education Minister Nouriya Al-Sabeeh ==
Johar has an ongoing feud with Education Minister Nouriya Al-Sabeeh. In May 2008, Johar joined with Hussein Quwaian Al-Mutairi to accuse Al-Sabeeh of not cooperating with the Kuwaiti University teachers' union and to urge Prime Minister Nasser Mohammed Al-Ahmed Al-Sabah not to retain her in the upcoming cabinet formation. In October 2008, Johar submitted a parliamentary request to publicly question Al-Sabeeh about her plans to introduce electronic learning into the school curriculums.

== Mandatory retirement age for teachers ==
On November 28, 2008, Johar joined MPs Abdullah Al-Roumi, Khaled Al-Sultan Bin Essa, Musallam Al-Barrak, and Marzouq Al-Hubaini Al-Azmi in formulating a bill to extend the mandatory retirement age for Kuwaiti teaching staff at Kuwait University from 65 to 70 years. They argued that Item 32 of Law no. 15/1979 has denied the country services of able and intelligent academicians by restricting retirement age of Kuwaitis to 65 years. They recommended that a clause be added to the law such that the retirement age can become 70 years and can further be extended to 75 years.
