= Mikhled Al-Azmi =

Kuwaiti politician

Mikhled Rashid Saad Gharib Al-Azmi (Arabic: مخلد راشد سعد غريب العازمي) is a former member of the Kuwaiti National Assembly representing the first district. While political parties are technically illegal in Kuwait, Al-Azmi affiliates with Islamist deputies.

== Sharia draft bill ==
On July 10, 2001, Al-Azmi and Waleed Al-Tabtabaie presented a draft bill to amend Kuwait's penal code to meet Islamic sharia law.

== Protest against Israeli attacks ==
On December 28, 2008, al-Azmi with fellow Kuwaiti lawmakers Musallam Al-Barrak, Marzouq Al-Ghanim, Jamaan Al-Harbash, Ahmed Al-Mulaifi, Mohammad Hayef Al-Mutairi, Ahmed Al-Sadoun, Nasser Al-Sane, and Waleed Al-Tabtabaie protested in front of the National Assembly building against attacks by Israel on Gaza. Protesters burned Israeli flags, waved banners reading, "No to hunger, no to submission" and chanted "Allahu Akbar". Israel launched air strikes against Hamas in the Gaza Strip on December 26 after a six-month ceasefire ended on December 18.
