= Jamaan Al-Harbash =

Kuwaiti politician (born 1970)

Jamaan Al-Harbash (Arabic: جمعان الحربش) is a member of the Kuwaiti National Assembly representing the second district.

== Opposition to falcon smuggling ==
On April 17, 2007, Al-Harbash and other MPs submitted documents to parliament claiming that several falcon shipments for "influential people" had been imported recently without proper testing. Kuwait banned bird imports as an avian influenza precaution, but the ban was eased in July 2006. Al-Harbash saw the smuggling as an example of corruption that puts the country at risk for bird flu: "Lifting the ban on falcons was a catastrophe. Why were they exempted from the ban despite warnings by doctors?" Al-Harbash said he would ask the parliament's health committee to study the situation and report back.

Kuwait reported 20 birds, including 18 falcons, tested positive for the deadly H5N1 strain of the bird flu on February 25 with bird flu cases reaching 132. In November 2005, the first bird infected with the H5N1 strain was detected in a flamingo at a seaside villa.

== Protest against Israeli attacks ==
On December 28, 2008, al-Harbash with fellow Kuwaiti lawmakers Mikhled Al-Azmi, Musallam Al-Barrak, Marzouq Al-Ghanim, Ahmed Al-Mulaifi, Mohammed Hayef Al-Mutairi, Ahmed Al-Sadoun, Nasser Al-Sane, and Waleed Al-Tabtabaie protested in front of the National Assembly building against attacks by Israel on Gaza. Protesters waved banners reading, "No to hunger, no to submission" and chanted "Allahu Akbar". Israel launched air strikes against Hamas in the Gaza Strip on December 26 after a six-month ceasefire ended on December 18.
