= Cybercrime Law No. 63 =

Law No. 63 of 2015 on Combating Information Technology Crimes, known as Cybercrime Law No. 63, is a law of Kuwait concerning various computer-related crimes. It came into effect on 12 January 2016.

The law was criticised by several international human rights organizations for its perceived limitations on freedom of expression and freedom of the press.

== Background ==
Kuwait was once considered the most tolerant Gulf country in terms of freedom of speech, but changes to national security laws since the 2011 protests have changed this view. However, sections of the Kuwaiti constitution guarantee freedom of opinion and expression, such as article 36.

=== Implementation ===
On 16 June 2015, the law was approved by the National Assembly. It was published on 7 July 2015.

On 22 June 2015, Minister of Justice Yaqoub al-Sane stated the law's purpose was to "preserve social stability" and the law only intended to punish those who "publish pornography or offend others".

== Law No. 63 of 2015 on Combating Information Technology Crimes ==
Law No. 63 contains 21 articles which set out the regulation of various online activities in Kuwait. Some of the articles include:

- Article 4 – punishes with imprisonment or a fine anyone who "establishes a website or publishes or produces or prepares or creates or sends or stores information or data with a view to use, distribute or display to others via the Internet or an information technology device that would prejudice public morality or manages a place for this purpose".
- Article 6 – punishes anyone that criticises the head of state, "shows contempt or disdain for the state constitution", "insults or demonstrates contempt for the judiciary or prejudices their integrity and impartiality", or "prejudices public morals, incites to breach public order or violate law even if a crime does not occur".
- Article 7 – punishes, for up to ten years imprisonment, a number of acts listed in Article 28 of the 2006 Press and Publications Law, including “the publication of incitement to overthrow the regime in the country".
- Article 13 – allows the government to "close shops or locations for a period of one year from the date on which any of the acts listed in the cybercrime law are committed and confiscate devices and software".

== International response ==
In January 2016, a joint statement was released by the Arabic Network for Human Rights Information, Article 19, the Gulf Center for Human Rights, the International Service for Human Rights, and Reporters Without Borders. The statement raised concerns over articles 4, 6, and 7, which the groups believed could be "used to limit freedom of expression on the Internet, as well as to target online activists" and "individual human rights defenders". They called on the Kuwaiti authorities to repeal the selected articles of Law No. 63, as well as the entirety of the Press and Publications Law.

The Human Rights Watch argued that articles 6, 7, and 13 work as an "effective barrier to critical political speech over the Internet, contrary to essential safeguards that article 19 of the ICCPR provides".
