= Nasser Al-Sane =

Kuwaiti politician

Nasser Jassim Abdullah Khalifa Al-Sane (Arabic: ناصر جاسم عبد الله خليفة الصانع) is a former member of the Kuwaiti National Assembly representing the third district. Born in 1955, Al-Sane obtained a PhD in Business Administration before being elected to the National Assembly in 1992. While political parties are illegal in Kuwait, Al-Sane affiliates with the Islamist Hadas party.

== Project Kuwait opposition ==
Project Kuwait is a $7 billion, 25-year plan, first formulated in 1997 by the SPC, to increase the country's oil production (and to help compensate for declines at the mature Burgan field), with the help of international oil companies. In particular, Kuwait aims to increase output at five northern oil fields (Abdali, Bahra, Ratqa, Raudhatain, and Sabriya) from their current rate of around 650,000 barrels per day (103,000 m^{3}/d) to 900,000 barrels per day (140,000 m^{3}/d) within three years.

Al-Sane opposed Project Kuwait and allowing foreign oil companies into Kuwait. On December 23, 2005, Al-Sane told the press that he opposed the entry of these foreign companies because it is barred by the constitution: "The step the government wants to take is against the law, and we have to stand against it strongly... The constitutional issue is the main one. We're not against foreign investments, but the problem is that you have to stick to the constitution."

== Ministry purging concerns ==
In May 2007, Al-Sane, chairman of the parliamentary subcommittee for Employment and Administrative Reforms, urged Prime Minister Sheikh Nasser Al-Mohammed Al-Sabah “to intervene and stop some ministers from ousting senior and highly experienced employees from the ministries.” Al-Sane argued that, “some ministers are forcing senior employees who have gained valuable experience in their respective fields to take retirement without even consulting them... This practice will prove harmful in the long run as employees with very little experience are being appointed at senior positions.” Al-Sane drafted a bill to address the issue, which he believes could be devises between the cabinet and the parliament: "If the Prime Minister does not take quick measures to end this practice, it will sour the relations between the government and parliament."

== Defense of Oil Minister Al-Olaim ==
In July 2007, several Popular Action Bloc MPs alleged that Oil Minister Mohammad Al-Olaim's bidding process for the refinery at Al-Zour was flawed. The MPs claimed that the awarding of the contracts was not made under the country's Tenders Law which governs all major public contracts. The MPs also threatened to grill Al-Olaim if he signed the contracts and demanded that the project be scrutinized by the Audit Bureau to make sure that it did not involve squandering public funds. After initially rejecting the calls, the minister later bowed to pressure and agreed to ask the cabinet to refer the project to the Bureau.

Al-Sane strongly defended Olaim and alleged that vested interests were behind the attacks on the minister. Al-Olaim was a leading member of the Hadas party to which Al-Sane belongs.

== Protest against Israeli attacks ==
On December 28, 2008, al-Mulaifi with fellow Kuwaiti lawmakers Mikhled Al-Azmi, Musallam Al-Barrak, Marzouq Al-Ghanim, Ahmed Al-Mulaifi, Jamaan Al-Harbash, Mohammed Hayef Al-Mutairi, Ahmed Al-Sadoun, and Waleed Al-Tabtabaie protested in front of the National Assembly building against attacks by Israel on Gaza. Protesters burned Israeli flags, waved banners reading, "No to hunger, no to submission" and chanted "Allahu Akbar". Israel launched air strikes against Hamas in the Gaza Strip on December 26 after a six-month ceasefire ended on December 18.
