= Ali Al-Daqbaashi =

Kuwaiti politician (born 1965)

Ali Salim Al-Daqbasi (born 5 December 1965) is a former Kuwaiti politician, representing the fourth district. Al-Daqbasi studied management before being elected to the National Assembly in 2003. While political parties are technically illegal in Kuwait, Al-Daqbasi affiliates with the Islamist deputies. He is on good terms with the royal family.

== Criticized Education Minister Nouria al-Subeih ==
On January 22, 2008, the parliament voted 27-19, with two abstentions, against the impeachment of Education Minister Nouria al-Subeih.

In the lead-up to the vote Al-Daqbasi, Musallam Al-Barrak, Saleh Ashour and Hussein Muzyed spoke against the minister while Khalaf Al-Enezi, Ali Al-Rashid, Mohammed Al-Sager, and Adel Al-Saraawi spoke in her defense.

Subeih had to defend herself against allegations that she had attempted to deceive the nation when she denied a press report that three male students had been sexually assaulted by an Asian worker at a state school. She explained she had been misinformed and issued an apology.

Islamist lawmaker Saad al-Shreih also accused Subeih of not showing enough respect for Islam when she did not punish a 14-year-old girl who had allegedly drawn a cross on her religion textbook and scribbled notes on it that she hated Islam. The minister told the house there was no evidence the girl had actually done that and so she was just referred to counseling. Shreih, however, still managed to gather the requisite signatures of ten lawmakers to force the no-confidence vote.
