= Khalaf Al-Enezi =

Member of the National Assembly of Kuwait (1946–2022)

Khalaf Al-Enezi (Arabic: خلف العنزي; 14 October 1946 – 19 December 2022) was a Kuwaiti politician who was a member of the Kuwaiti National Assembly, representing the second district. Al-Enezi worked at the National Council before being elected to the National Assembly in 1981. Al-Enezi was an independent deputy and was on good terms with the royal family.

== Defended Education Minister Nouria al-Subeih ==
On 22 January 2008, the parliament voted 27 to 19, with two abstentions, against the impeachment of Education Minister Nouria al-Subeih.

In the lead-up to the vote, MPs Ali Al-Daqbaashi, Musallam Al-Barrak, Saleh Ashour and Hussein Muzyed spoke against the minister while Al-Enezi, Ali Al-Rashid, Mohammed Al-Sager, and Adel Al-Saraawi spoke in her defense.

Subeih had to defend herself against allegations that she had attempted to deceive the nation when she denied a press report that three male students had been sexually assaulted by an Asian worker at a state school. She explained she had been misinformed and issued an apology.

Islamist lawmaker Saad al-Shreih also accused Subeih of not showing enough respect for Islam when she did not punish a 14-year-old girl who had allegedly drawn a cross on her religion textbook and written that she hated Islam. The minister told the house there was no evidence this had occurred, so the girl was referred for counselling. Shreih, however, gathered the requisite signatures of ten lawmakers to force the no-confidence vote.

== Supported increase in minimum wage ==
Al-Enezi and Sadoon Al-Otaibi have both dismissed past wage increases as “too small” and not enough to meet the steep hikes in consumer prices. On 21 February 2008, the parliament approved a 120 dinar ($440) monthly pay rise for nationals in the public and private sectors after inflation hit 7.3%, a 15-year high. It also decided to raise by 50 dinars ($183) the pay of foreigners employed by the government. In response, Al-Enezi said, “We reject this increase because it is well below expectations. We urge the government to review its decision."

The average monthly salary of Kuwaiti employees is more than 1,000 dinars ($3,650), but lower for expatriates.

== Dispute with MP Al-Mulaifi ==
On 4 September 2008, Al-Enezi blasted opposition MP Ahmed Al-Mulaifi for criticizing Prime Minister Nasser Mohammed Al-Ahmed Al-Sabah. Al-Mulaifi had attacked the Prime Minister for planning a trip to the United States and the United Nations at a time when "there are plenty of tense and complicated issues domestically."

== Personal life and death ==
Al-Enezi supported Project Kuwait.

Al-Enezi died on 19 December 2022, at the age of 76.
