= Jabir Al-Azmi =

Kuwaiti politician

Jabir Al-Azmi is a former Kuwaiti politician, representing the fifth district. Born in 1970, Al-Azmi studied Sharia law and worked in at the Kuwait Ministry of Awqaf and Islamic Affairs before being elected to the National Assembly in 2006.

== Opposed Guaranteeing Bank Deposits ==
On October 28, 2008, the parliament voted 50–7 to insure all types of deposits in all local banks within Kuwait. Al-Azmi opposed the bill, along with Hussein Al-Qallaf Al-Bahraini, Daifallah Bouramiya, Mohammed Al-Obaid, Mohammed Hayef Al-Mutairi, Musallam Al-Barrak and Waleed Al-Tabtabaie. Al-Azmi accused the Cabinet of speeding up the bill's passage for the benefit of monetary tycoons.
