= Fouad Mohammed Thunayan Al-Ghanim =

Kuwaiti businessman

Fouad Mohamad Thunayan AlGhanim
- Born: December 20, 1944 (age 81); Kuwait
- Occupation: Businessperson

Fouad Mohamad Thunayan Alghanim (Arabic: فؤاد محمد ثنيان الغانم), is a Kuwaiti businessman who is the founder and Chairman of Fouad Alghanim & Sons Group of Companies, one of the largest conglomerates in Kuwait. The company has grown during the last fifty years into one of the largest corporations with interests in Engineering, Construction, Power, Oil and Gas, Automotive, Investment, Trading, Shipping, Aviation, Telecom, Hospitality and Real Estate.

Fouad Alghanim is also a Chairman at Advanced Technology Co. KSCC, a Member at Forum Mondial de L'Economie, a Member at US Middle East Project, Inc, and a Member of the International Council at Belfer Center for Science & International Affairs. Alghanim was previously employed as a Vice Chairman by ILAF Takaful Insurance KSCC. He also served on the board at First International Merchant Bank Plc and Kuwait Finance & Investment Co KSCC.

== Family ==
He is the brother of Ali Mohamad Thuyman Alghanim the Chairman of the Kuwait Chamber of Commerce and Industry and the paternal uncle of Marzouq Alghanim who is the former speaker of the Kuwait National Assembly

== Education ==
Alghanim received an undergraduate degree from Kuwait University and a graduate of Iowa State University, where he earned a B.SC in Sciences and Humanities.

== Controversy ==
=== Offshore Leaks ===
According to Offshore Leaks, a report prepared by an International consortium of investigative journalists in more than 65 countries who collaborated on in-depth investigative stories, the company Fouad Alghanim & Sons Group of Companies has been using offshore accounts in Panama. The company's name was featured in a leak of confidential records.

=== Tax Dispute in Jordan ===
In 2013, Alghanim submitted a tax dispute with the Government of Jordan to arbitration under the auspices of the International Centre for Settlement of Investment Disputes. The arbitration panel found in favor of the Government of Jordan.

=== Eurofighter involvement ===
In 2016, Kuwait signed a contract with Leonardo, an Italian defense contractor, to purchase 28 Eurofighter Typhoons. Fouad Alghanim was a member of the Kuwait resistance during the occupation of Kuwait by Iraq in 1990. He has remained active in Kuwait defense matters and advocated the purchase of the Eurofighter as part of Kuwait's defense strategy.
