= Ali Al-Rashid =

Former Kuwaiti Member of Parliament

Ali Al-Rashid is a former Kuwaiti politician member, representing the second district. Born in 1967, Al-Rashid worked as a lawyer before being elected to the National Assembly in 2003. Al-Rashid affiliated with the liberal National Democratic Alliance, but left the coalition on November 23, 2008.

== Opposed severing ties with Denmark, Europe ==
On November 6, 2006, the parliament voted 22-15 to approve severing diplomatic ties with Denmark over the Jyllands-Posten Muhammad cartoons controversy and spending about US$50 (€39.20) million to defend Muhammad's image in the West. Both votes were nonbinding, meaning the Cabinet did not have to abide by them. Al-Rashid voted against cutting diplomatic ties, saying that Muslims it was individuals, not governments, who insulted Muhammad. Al-Rashid was quoted as saying, "We here in Kuwait curse Christians in many of our mosques, should those (Christian) countries boycott Kuwait?"

== Against bailing out debtors ==
On December 19, 2006, parliament voted 39-20 to reject a bill that would have seen the government write off $27bn of its citizens' private debts. Al-Rashid voted against the bill, saying its proponents succumbed to pressure by constituents so that they would be re-elected: "It is very easy for me to become a hero and to forget Kuwait, public money, the interest of our children and future generations."

== Human rights abuses "made up" ==
on May 13, 2007, Al-Rashid, who heads parliament’s human rights committee, was quoted as saying that servant abuse is an “exception” and some maids “make up” stories of abuse to get out of their contracts. However, he conceded the government must act more quickly to guarantee prompt payment of laborers and punish companies that “harm Kuwait’s reputation,” by not meeting their obligations.

== Defended Education Minister Nouria al-Subeih ==
On January 22, 2008, the parliament voted 27-19, with two abstentions, against the impeachment of Education Minister Nouria al-Subeih. In the lead-up to the vote, Saleh Ashour, Ali Al-Daqbaashi, and Musallam Al-Barrak spoke against the minister while Al-Rashid, Khalaf Al-Enezi, Mohammed Al-Sager, and Adel Al-Saraawi spoke in her defense. Subeih had to defend herself against allegations that she had attempted to deceive the nation when she denied a press report that three male students had been sexually assaulted by an Asian worker at a state school. She explained she had been misinformed and issued an apology.

Islamist lawmaker Saad al-Shreih also accused Subeih of not showing enough respect for Islam when she did not punish a 14-year-old girl who had allegedly drawn a cross on her religion text book and scribbled notes on it that she hated Islam. The minister told the house there was no evidence the girl had actually done that and so she was just referred to counseling. Shreih, however, still managed to gather the requisite signatures of ten lawmakers to force the no-confidence vote.

== Supporting coeducation ==
Coeducation in Kuwait has been a contentious issue since the rise of the Islamists in parliament in the 1990s.

In 1996, conservative Kuwaiti lawmakers banned coed classes at the state universities and technical colleges, include Kuwait University. The ban prohibited mixing of the sexes in classes, libraries, cafeterias, labs and extracurricular activities at Kuwait University. Compliance was lax until lawmakers grilled Education Minister Misaed Haroun about it in April 1997, and he committed to full segregation by the end of the next school year.

In 2000, when foreign universities were first allowed to open branches in Kuwait, the ban was extended to those institutions as well.

On February 6, 2008, Al-Rashid proposed a bill that would allow men and women to take classes together in Kuwaiti universities, which would reverse the 12-year-old ban on coeducation. On the topic, Al-Rashid said: "Kuwait University was established in the 1960s as a co-ed university. Segregating students only came in 1996. If we are to go back to the origin of things, Kuwait University then is originally a co-ed facility. Religion is clear about this subject."

On the same day that he proposed the bill, Al-Rashid allegedly received a death threat. According to Al-Rashid, an angry man left a threatening message at Al-Rashid's office. "If he doesn't withdraw the bill, seven bullets will settle the matter," Al-Rashid described the caller as saying in the course of an insult-filled rant. Soon afterwards, police told Al-Rashid that they had apprehended and were interrogating a suspect in the threat, a retired civil servant.

According to Al-Rashid, university teachers and officials have complained it has been difficult and costly to teach male and female students separately. Among Kuwait’s neighbors, state universities are coed in Bahrain and Oman, but segregated in Saudi Arabia, Qatar and the United Arab Emirates. Conservative lawmakers want to extend the ban to foreign primary and secondary schools. Kuwaiti primary and secondary schools are already gender-segregated.

== Supporting government funds for college tuition ==
On September 28, 2008, Al-Rashid, along with MPs Abdullah Al-Roumi and Adel Al-Saraawi proposed a draft law which suggested that the government fund Kuwaiti students' higher education at private colleges. According to the bill, the government would bear half of the expenses for students enrolled in private universities in Kuwait, excluding Kuwait University.
