= Khaled Sultan bin Essa =

Kuwaiti politician (born 1940)

Khaled Sultan bin Essa (born 1940) is a former member of the Kuwaiti National Assembly, being elected several times (most recently in 2012, though the election was invalidated). Bin Essa earned an MA in business administration and was Chairman of the Kuwait Graduates Society before being elected to the National Assembly in 2008. He belonged to the Islamic Salafi Alliance.

He served as vice-speaker of the National Assembly between 2009 and 2012.

== Mandatory retirement age for teachers ==
On November 28, 2008, MP Abdullah Al-Roumi joined MPs bin Essa, Hassan Johar, Musallam Al-Barrak, and Marzouq Al-Hubaini Al-Azmi in formulating a bill to extend the mandatory retirement age for Kuwaiti teaching staff at Kuwait University from 65 to 70 years. Al-Roumi argued that Item 32 of Law no. 15/1979 has denied the country services of able and intelligent academicians by restricting the retirement age of Kuwaitis to 65 years. He recommended that a clause be added to the law such that the retirement age can become 70 years and can further be extended to 75 years.
