= Adel Al-Saraawi =

Former Kuwait Member of Parliament

Adel Al-Saraawi (Arabic: عادل الصرعاوي; born 1962) is a former member of the Kuwaiti National Assembly, representing the third district. Al-Saraawi studied accounting before being elected to the National Assembly in 2003. He is considered an Independent deputy, but affiliates with the Islamist members.

== Political stances ==
=== Defended Education Minister Nouria al-Subeih ===
On 22 January 2008, the parliament voted 27-19, with two abstentions, against the impeachment of Education Minister Nouria al-Subeih.

In the lead-up to the vote, Saleh Ashour, Ali Al-Daqbaashi, Musallam Al-Barrak and Hussein Muzyed spoke against the minister while Al-Saraawi, Khalaf Al-Enezi, Ali Al-Rashid, and Mohammed Al-Sager spoke in her defense.

Subeih had to defend herself against allegations that she had attempted to deceive the nation when she denied a press report that three male students had been sexually assaulted by an Asian worker at a state school. She explained she had been misinformed and issued an apology.

Saad al-Shreih, an Islamist lawmaker, criticized Subeih for allegedly inadequate respect towards Islam, citing an incident involving a 14-year-old girl who reportedly drew a cross on her religion textbook and expressed disdain for Islam. Subeih defended her decision in parliament, stating there was no conclusive evidence of the girl's actions, resulting in only counseling referral. Despite this, Shreih successfully rallied the required ten lawmaker signatures to initiate a no-confidence vote against Subeih.

=== Resignation of Oil Minister ===
On June 25, 2007, Al-Saraawi, Abdullah Al-Roumi, Musallam Al-Barrak accused Oil Minister Sheik Ali Al Jarrah Al-Sabah of using his influence when he was chief executive officer of Kuwait's Burgan Bank to open accounts at the request of his cousin, in the names of paper companies so that they could be used for siphoning the stolen money. Minister Al-Sabah, who is a member of the royal family, resigned before a vote of no-confidence could be held against him. Transportation Minister Sharedah al-Mawashergi resigned in solidarity with the Oil Minister.

=== Supported government funds for college tuition ===
On September 28, 2008, Al-Saraawi, along with MPs Abdullah Al-Roumi, Ali Al-Rashid and Marzouq Al-Ghanem proposed a draft law which suggested that the government fund Kuwaiti students' higher education at private colleges. According to the bill, the government would bear half of the expenses for students enrolled in private universities in Kuwait, excluding Kuwait University.

=== Debate over Future Generations Fund ===
In November 2008, Al-Saraawi submitted a request for an expanded debate on the impact of the 2008 financial crisis on Kuwaiti investments abroad, specifically the Future Generations Fund and the State Reserves Fund. The two funds are managed by Kuwait Investment Authority (KIA), the country's sovereign wealth fund, mostly in the United States and Europe. Its assets were estimated at close to $300 billion before the outbreak of the global crisis. Saraawi said that it is no secret that there is a direct impact from the global financial meltdown on Kuwaiti investments. He added that MPs also want to know the extent of this impact on the country's financial surpluses in the past few years. A number of top officials, including the finance minister and the governor of the Central Bank, have explicitly said that Kuwaiti foreign holdings have been impacted by the crisis but stressed that the effect has so far been "small."
