= Daifallah Bouramiya =

Kuwaiti politician

Daifallah Bouramiya is a former member of the Kuwaiti National Assembly, representing the fourth district. Born in 1957, Bouramiya studied public health and worked as a doctor before being elected to the National Assembly in 2003. He served as an independent deputy.

== Removing Health Minister Al-Jarallah ==
On April 4, 2005, Bouramiya grilled Health Minister Mohammad Al-Jarallah over alleged mismanagement, leading the minister to resign two days later. As party of the grilling, Bouramiya read out a long list of accusations, including deterioration of health services and squandering of public funds in medical purchases and hospital rehabilitation projects. The minister resigned before he could be brought before a no-confidence vote, which was to be led by Bouramiya and ten other MPs. Some newspapers alleged that the MPs behind the motion were upset that no member of the powerful Awazem tribe or Shiite had been named minister in recent Cabinet changes.

== Resignation of Oil Minister Bader Mishari al-Humaidhi ==
After Al-Humaidhi was appointed oil minister in the October 28, 2007, cabinet shuffle, Bouramiya and Musallam Al-Barrak wanted to question him about failing to curb consumer debts and embezzlement in state investments abroad during his time as finance minister. The prime minister preempted the parliamentary grilling and angered lawmakers who accused him of covering up corruption and undermining their constitutional right to question ministers.

The political standoff reached unprecedented levels when the prime minister and the speaker of the house, Jassem Al-Kharafi, exchanged criticism and accusations in a television interview and a statement published in the country's newspapers.

== Opposed guaranteeing bank deposits ==
On October 28, 2008, the parliament voted 50-7 to insure all types of deposits in all local banks within Kuwait. Bouramiya opposed the bill, along with Jabir Al-Azmi, Hussein Al-Qallaf Al-Bahraini, Mohammed Al-Obaid, Mohammed Hayef Al-Mutairi, Musallam Al-Barrak and Waleed Al-Tabtabaie. Bouramiya accused the Cabinet of speeding up the bill's passage for the benefit of monetary tycoons.

== Advanced treatment hospital ==
On January 1, 2009, Bouramiya submitted a draft law to set up a specialty hospital to treat Kuwaiti citizens who require advanced medical treatment. The document states that a separate hospital to treat critical cases be built and suggests that government own 50 percent shares while the rest be open for public subscription.

== Walk-out protest against cabinet ==
On January 13, 2009, Bouramiya and ten other MPs walked out of the year's first session complaining of a lack of new faces in the new cabinet.
