= Bashar Al-Sayegh =

Kuwaiti journalist (born 1977)

- Born: January 29, 1977 (age 49); Kuwait
- Education: The Public Authority for Applied Education and Training
- Years active: 1995 Till now
- Employer: Al Jarida newspaper
- Title: General Manager
- Political party: National Democratic Alliance / General Secretary

Bashar Al-Sayegh (Arabic: بشار الصايغ; born 29 January 1977) is a Kuwaiti journalist and politician.

== Detention ==
On August 18, 2007 Al-Sayegh was arrested by the state security services after comments that insulted Kuwait's ruler, Emir Sheikh Sabah Al-Ahmed Al-Sabah, were posted on his personal website, www.alommah.org, although the comments were posted anonymously and deleted by AlSayegh 15 minutes later.

Kuwait's Interior Ministry has said the arrest of journalist Bashar Al-Sayegh, over comments about the country's Amir, was lawful and denied press claims the reporter had been kidnapped. Acting Interior Undersecretary Major General Ahmad Al-Rujaib said in a press conference that the comments were punishable by law.

"This is a national security crime" he said, referring to article 25 of criminal law which states a prison term "not exceeding five years will be handed down to anyone who publicly challenges the rights or authorities of the Amir or insults him – whether in speech, writing, drawing, or any other means of expression."

Al-Sayegh was released days later after being interrogated.

== Journalistic work ==
Al-Sayegh worked in Al Anba newspaper from 2001 to 2007 as an IT journalist. Then he moved to Al Jarida newspaper in March 2007 as parliament journalist.

In 2009 he was promoted as head of parliament department in Al Jarida newspaper and IT Manager. In 2021 Bashar was appointed as its general manager.

== Political work ==
Al-Sayegh is a member of National Democratic Alliance (AlTahalof); a liberal party in Kuwait since 2003. In 2015, AlSayegh was elected as General Secretary for the party for two years.

== KuwaitNews ==
Al-Sayegh established an online newspaper portal in 2009. The newspaper was sold in October 2016 for $2.2 million.

== Dark Politics ==
In 2017, Al-Sayegh founded Dark Politics, a political and media consultancy in Kuwait. The company publishes an electronic magazine containing political reports on the Kuwaiti National Assembly and the government. The company also offers a verification service for news and political statements.

It is one of the first Kuwaiti companies specialized in political consultations, after the Ministry of Commerce allowed this work to be licensed.

== TV interviews ==
- AlMajles Channel in April 2015
- AlMajles Channel, "Hashtag Show" in December 2014
- AlYoum Channel, "180 Degree Show" in September 2013
- AlYoum Channel, "180 Degree Show" in April 2014
