= Education system in Kuwait =

Kuwait has an extensive education system. The compulsory primary education program follows kindergarten at age 4. Primary school that begins at age six takes 6 years and preparatory school another 3. During this introductory phase pupils may enrol at state, religious or private schools by choice.

Three years of preparatory schooling follow at the end of which a basic education completion certificate is awarded. During this time a student’s aptitude is examined in order to determine their best secondary education route.

There are three streams in secondary education, namely general (3 years), technical (as long a 5 years) and vocational. Technical secondary schools are organized around industrial, commercial or agricultural themes. Both technical and general schooling are conduits to tertiary education.

Coeducation in Kuwait was a contentious issue since the Islamists gained slight power in parliament in 1996.

In 2015, laws regarding segregation in universities were overturned on the basis of wrongful implementation. The original law only stated “Student attire, behavior and activities shall be according to Islamic values”.
