= Al-Jarida =

Arabic-language daily newspaper in Kuwait

Al-Jarida الجريدة
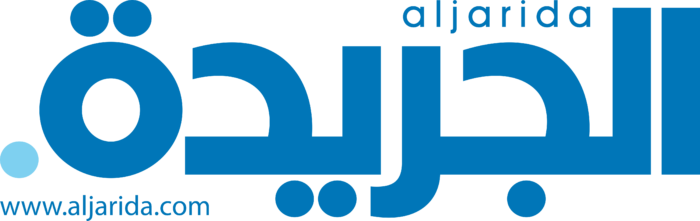
- Type: Daily newspaper
- Owner: Mohammed Al Sager
- Editor-in-chief: Nasser Lafi AlOtaibi
- General manager: Bashar AlSayegh
- Founded: 2 July 2007; 19 years ago
- Political alignment: Liberal
- Language: Arabic
- Headquarters: Kuwait
- Website: www.aljarida.com

Al-Jarida (Arabic: الجريدة, lit. 'The Newspaper') is an Arabic-language Kuwaiti daily newspaper.

== History and profile ==
Al Jarida was first published on 2 July 2007. The paper is owned by Mohammed Al-Sager, the former editor-in-chief of Al-Qabas and the former Arab Parliament president. The editor-in-chief for Al-Jarida is Khalid Alhelal. Bashar AlSayegh was appointed General Manager of Al Jarida Company in June 2021.

The paper has a secular stance. On 9 May 2012 the editor-in-chief of the daily was fined 5,000 dinar ($17,550) by the Kuwaiti authorities due to the publication of an article giving the details of the meeting between the Emir and former parliamentarians without taking written approval from the Emiri office in advance.
