= Abdel Latif El Zein =

Lebanese politician (1932–2019)

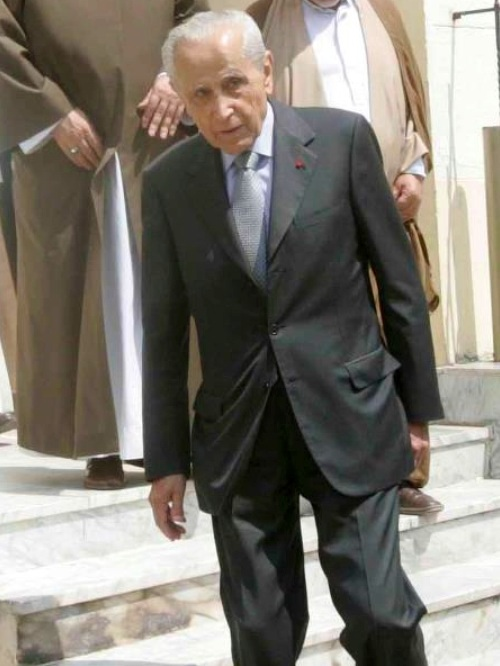

Abdel Latif El Zein (Arabic: عبد اللطيف الزين; November 23, 1932 – May 26, 2019) was a Lebanese politician who served as Member of Parliament from 1960 until 2018. He was the longest-serving member of parliament in the world. He previously held the position of Minister of Agriculture.

== Biography ==
He was the son of Youssef Beik El-Zein, a prominent Lebanese figure. Two of his brothers also previously served as Members of Parliament: Abdelkarim El-Zein and Abdelmajid El-Zein. Following the 1953 legislative elections the eldest Member of Parliament at the time was Youssef El-Zein who headed the opening parliament session for electing the parliament speaker. The youngest elected Member of Parliament in that year was Ghassan Tueni. 56 years later elected MP Abdelatif El-Zein is parliament's eldest member who is scheduled to play the same role his father Youssef did in 1953. In an additional coincidence elected Beirut 1 MP Nayla Tueni is now one of parliament's youngest members as her grandfather Ghassan was in 1953.
