= Legal system of Kuwait =

Kuwait follows the "civil law system" modeled after the French legal system. Kuwait's legal system is largely secular. Sharia law governs only family law for Muslim residents, while non-Muslims in Kuwait have a secular family law. For the application of family law, there are three separate court sections: Sunni (Maliki), Shia, and non-Muslim. According to the United Nations, Kuwait's legal system is a mix of English common law, French civil law, Egyptian civil law and Islamic law.

The court system in Kuwait is secular. Unlike other Arab states of the Persian Gulf, Kuwait does not have Sharia courts. Sections of the civil court system administer family law. Kuwait has the most secular commercial law in the Persian Gulf region.

== The state ==
Kuwait is a constitutional monarchy with a parliamentary government. About 85% of Kuwait's population (2.8 million in 2013) are Muslims.

According to the United Nations, Kuwait's legal system is a mix of British common law, French civil law, Egyptian civil law and Islamic law.

== Constitution and judges ==
Roughly half of Kuwait's judges are non-citizens—mainly Egyptians. The non-citizen judges are on one-year to three-year contracts. The Constitution of Kuwait makes Islam the state religion. The 1961 Press and Publications Law prohibits the publication of any material that incites persons to commit crimes, creates hatred, or spreads dissension.

== See also ==
- Politics of Kuwait
- Human rights in Kuwait
