= Kuwaiti minimum wage =

Minimum wage in Kuwaiti

On February 21, 2008, the Kuwaiti Parliament approved a monthly pay rise of 120 Kuwaiti dinars (KWD) ($440) for nationals working in the public and private sectors after inflation rose to 7.3%, the highest level in 16 years. The decision was also made to raise the pay of foreigners employed by the government by 50 KWD ($184).

This decision was met with criticism, particularly from Khalaf Al-Enezi, a member of the National Assembly of Kuwait, who rejected the approved increase in minimum wage as it was lower than expected, and urged the government to review its decision.

As of 2025, the minimum wage according to the Kuwait employment law, the minimum wage is 75 (KWD) Kuwaiti Dinars Per Month, unchanged since 2017.
