= Ahmed Abd Ellatif =

Chairman of the Arab Scout Committee

Air Vice-Marshal Ahmed Abd Ellatif
- أحمد عبد اللطيف

Chairman of the Arab Scout Committee

Air Vice-Marshal Ahmed Abd Ellatif (Egyptian Arabic: أحمد عبد اللطيف) of Alexandria, Egypt served as the Chairman of the Arab Scout Committee.

In 2009, he was awarded the 319th Bronze Wolf, the only distinction of the World Organization of the Scout Movement, awarded by the World Scout Committee for exceptional services to world Scouting.
