= Abdou Latif Guèye =

Senegalese politician (1956–2008)

Abdou Latif Guèye (March 4, 1956 – April 6, 2008) was a Senegalese politician. He was Secretary-General of the Senegalese Democratic Rally (RDS), as well as the head of Jamra, a non-governmental organization. He was the Sixth Vice-president of the National Assembly of Senegal from 2007 to 2008.

== Life and career ==
Guèye was born in Dakar. In his youth he was active in politics, participating in clandestine Marxist–Leninist groups; he was arrested for "subversive activities" when he was 17. He joined Cheikh Anta Diop's National Democratic Rally when it was founded in 1976. He ended his political activities in 1982 to devote himself to civil society and journalism. In 1983, he founded Jamra, a monthly magazine that was the "first Senegalese review on social issues", and in 1984 he became editor-in-chief of the weekly newspaper Walfadjri.

For more than 20 years, he was the Executive President of Jamra, an Islamic NGO devoted to fighting "social evils", particularly drugs and sexually transmitted diseases. He founded the first Center for Documentation and Information on Drug Abuse and AIDS in 1987.

Guèye and Jamra entered politics on the side of the opposition in 1999, supporting Abdoulaye Wade's successful candidacy in the 2000 presidential election. He was named as the leader of a political party, the Senegalese Democratic Rally (RDS), on May 9, 2000, and in the same month President Wade appointed him as Special Advisor to the President of the Republic, with the rank of Ambassador. Accused of trafficking antiretroviral medicine, he was dismissed from his post as Special Advisor in October 2002. He was imprisoned from June 2003 to August 2004, at which point he was rehabilitated by the justice system.

The RDS joined the CAP 21 coalition of parties supporting President Wade in December 2006, and Guèye was elected to the National Assembly in the June 2007 parliamentary election through national list proportional representation as a candidate of the pro-Wade Sopi Coalition. In the National Assembly, he was elected as its Sixth Vice-president.

== Later life and death ==
In early 2008, shortly before his death, Guèye sent a letter of protest to the Dutch embassy regarding Fitna, a Dutch film considered hostile to Islam. He was killed in a traffic accident on National Road No. 1 while travelling to Tambacounda, in the east of Senegal, on the night of April 5–6 2008.
