= Saleh Al-Mulla =

Kuwaiti politician (born 1971)

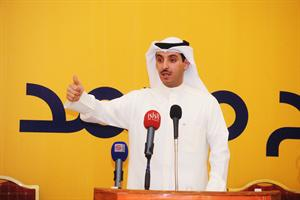

Saleh Mohammad Al-Mulla was elected two times to the National Assembly of Kuwait in 2008 and 2009 after snap elections, representing the third district, and generally affiliates with the liberal deputies. Born in 1971, Al-Mulla studied business at Kuwait University and received a M.A in political science from Harvard University and he was previously a diplomat representing Kuwait in the ministry of foreign affairs. He has two sons, Mohammad Saleh AlMulla and Khaled Saleh AlMulla. Saleh AlMulla was the youngest head of parliament of Kuwait at the time of his appointment. In 2015, he was arrested and accused of insulting the Emir of Kuwait and President of Egypt on his Twitter. However, he was acquitted from these charges.

He is a member of, and is supported by, the Kuwait Democratic Forum (KDF) (المنبر الديمقراطي الكويتي); a progressive Kuwaiti political organisation that promotes civil liberties and democratisation.

== Policies supported ==
On December 29, 2010, Al-Mulla voted in favor of an Islamic bill that would allow military personnel in the Kuwaiti Army to grow beards.

In an August 11, 2008, interview with the Arab Times, Al-Mulla said "The time has come for the enactment of a law to recognize and legalize political parties in the country."

In an August 11, 2008, interview with the Arab Times, Al-Mulla supported allowing women to join the Army and Police.

On September 22, 2008, Al-Mulla demanded from Minister of Social Affairs and Labor Bader Al-Duwailah a list of companies involved in trafficking. Mulla also asked about the measures taken against violating companies and other steps that would be taken in the future to prevent such violations from taking place.

On November 8, 2008, Al-Mulla proposed that Kuwait allow Iraq to back pay its debt to Kuwait in natural gas.

On November 19, 2008, Al-Mulla told the Arab Times that he believed that three MPs who were filing to question Prime Minister Nasser were secretly seeking to provoke an unconstitutional dissolution of the parliament.
