= Kuwait's foreign worker sponsorship system =

Kuwait's foreign worker sponsorship system mandates that expatriates must be sponsored by a local employer to get a work permit. In August 2008, MP Abdullah Al-Roumi declared that he would draft a law to scrap Kuwait's "kafeel" foreign worker sponsorship system: "The government should be the only kafeel... We have scores of bachelors residing in Kuwait with an equal number of crimes. Many are caused due to the 'trading with humans' issue which taints the reputation of Kuwait."

Plans to change the system were dropped in 2011.
