= Marzouq Al-Hubaini Al-Azmi =

Kuwaiti politician

Marzouq Al-Hubaini Al-Azmi is a member of the Kuwaiti National Assembly, representing the fifth district. Born in 1952, Al-Azmi studied business administration and worked in the National Council before being elected to the National Assembly in 1996. While political parties are technically illegal in Kuwait, Al-Azmi is part of the Popular Action Bloc.

== Mandatory Retirement Age for Teachers ==
On 28 November 2008, MP Abdullah Al-Roumi joined MPs Khaled Al-Sultan Bin Essa, Hassan Johar, Musallam Al-Barrak, and Al-Azmi in formulating a bill to extend the mandatory retirement age for Kuwaiti teaching staff at Kuwait University from 65 to 70 years. They argued that Item 32 of Law no. 15/1979 has denied the country services of able and intelligent academicians by restricting retirement age of Kuwaitis to 65 years. They recommended that a clause be added to the law such that the retirement age can become 70 years and can further be extended to 75 years.
