= Abdullah Al-Roumi =

Kuwaiti politician (born 1949)

Abdullah al-Roumi
- عبدالله الرومي
- Born: 1949 (age 76–77)
- Citizenship: Kuwait
- Office: member of the National Assembly of Kuwait

Abdullah Al-Roumi (Arabic: عبدالله الرومي; born 1949) is a Kuwaiti politician and lawyer who served as the Deputy Prime Minister, Minister of Justice, and Supreme Attorney General of Kuwait. Notably, he was appointed Deputy Prime Minister in April 2021, marking the first time someone outside the ruling family held the position. Prior to his executive appointments, Al-Roumi was an elected member of the Kuwaiti National Assembly from the first district since 1985, known for his liberal and independent stance.

== Political stances ==
=== Pro Gun Control ===
In February 2005, following a surge in Al-Qaeda related violence, the Kuwaiti parliament unanimously approved a law granting extensive powers to the police for searching and confiscating illegal weapons. Al-Roumi was a leading advocate for this legislation, which streamlined the process for police to secure warrants for searches in private residences. Notably, the law also permits female inspectors to search women’s quarters, traditionally restricted to men, in alignment with Islamic principles. This legal move was reminiscent of a similar but temporary law enacted in 1992 in response to increased gun ownership post the 1990 invasion of Kuwait, which was not renewed in 1994 amid debates over the right to bear arms.

=== Allegations Against Oil Minister ===
In June 2007, al-Roumi, Adel Al-Saraawi, and Musallam Al-Barrak led impeachment proceedings against Oil Minister Ali Al Jarrah Al Sabah on charges of corruption. Al-Roumi accused Sheik Ali of attempting to intimidate a witness involved in the case. In response, the minister asserted that his communication with the witness was solely to encourage full disclosure of information. Subsequently, Sheik Ali resigned on June 27, preempting the scheduled no-confidence vote following a public questioning.

During the impeachment proceedings, Al-Roumi also made the following public statement against Sheik Ali: "You have to submit your resignation today because what you said has humiliated the Kuwaiti people." Sheikh Ali had been quoted by the local Al Qabas newspaper as saying that he considers former oil minister Sheikh Ali Khalifa Al Sabah, a defendant in a major graft case, as "my master and that I consult him occasionally on oil issues."

=== Campaign to Reform Foreign Worker Sponsorship System ===
In August 2008, Al-Roumi declared that he was going to draft a law to scrap Kuwait's foreign worker sponsorship system, under which expatriates must be sponsored by a local employer to get a work permit: "The government should be the only kafeel... We have scores of bachelors residing in Kuwait with an equal number of crimes. Many are caused due to the 'trading with humans' issue which taints the reputation of Kuwait."

=== Denmark Boycott ===
In February 2008, Al-Roumi called for the Kuwaiti government to boycott Denmark in response to the Jyllands-Posten Muhammad cartoons controversy and was quoted as saying, "No Muslim can accept this insult against the Prophet... It is a form of terrorism."

=== Support For Female Candidates ===
In 2008, Al-Roumi expressed his support for women's active participation in the legislature. On 10 May 2008, he spoke at the inauguration of a women's campaign headquarters in the Salwa area. However, on 30 November 1999, Al-Roumi voted against granting women the right to vote.

=== Runner-Up in Speaker Election ===
On 1 June 2008, Jassem Al-Kharafi was re-elected National Assembly Speaker on Sunday, after gaining 52 votes against 11 to his opponent, Abdullah Al-Roumi.

=== Supports Government Funds for College Tuition ===
In 2002 Kuwait started allowing private universities in the country, beginning with the Gulf University for Science and Technology. On 28 September 2008, MPs Abdullah Al-Roumi, Marzouq Al-Ghanem, Ali Al-Rashid, and Adel Al-Saraawi proposed a law to have the government pay half of Kuwaiti students' tuition at these private colleges.

=== Reforming Mandatory Retirement Age for Teachers ===
On 28 November 2008, Al-Roumi joined MPs Khalid Al-Sultan, Hassan Johar, Musallam Al-Barrak, and Marzouq Al-Hubaini in formulating a bill to extend the mandatory retirement age for Kuwaiti teaching staff at Kuwait University from 65 to 70 years. Al-Roumi argued that Item 32 of Law no. 15/1979 has denied the country services of able and intelligent academicians by restricting retirement age of Kuwaitis to 65 years. He recommended that a clause be added to the law such that the retirement age can become 70 years and can further be extended to 75 years.
