= Mohammed Al-Mutair =

Kuwaiti politician (born 1969)

- محمد المطير
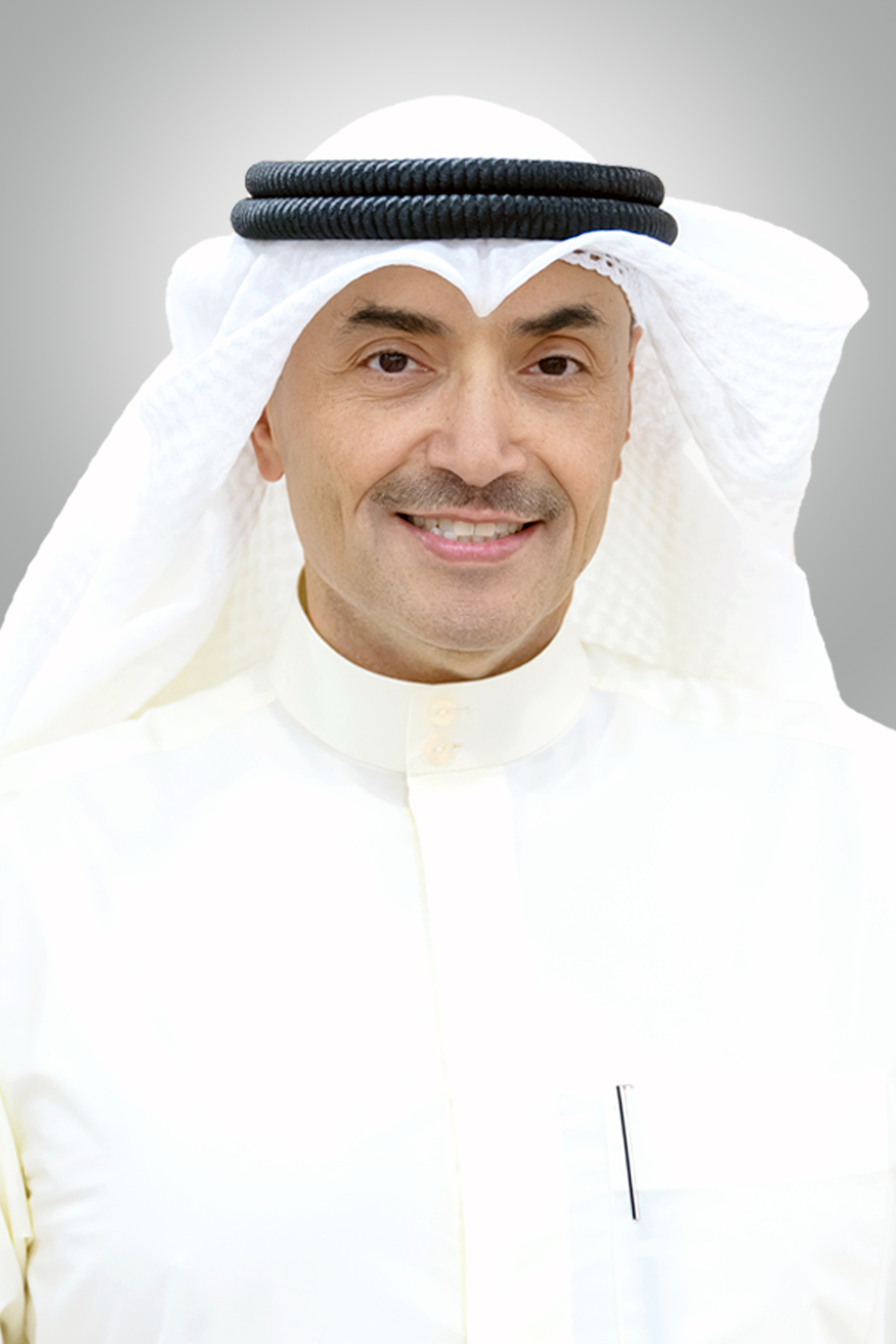
- Official Portrait, 2022

Member of National Assembly of Kuwait
- In office March 19, 2023 – May 10, 2024
- Constituency: Second District
- In office 19 July 2003 – 7 October 2012
- Constituency: Second District

Personal details
- Born: May 5, 1969 (age 57)
- Citizenship: Kuwait
- Education: University of San Diego
- Occupation: Politician

Mohammed Barak Al-Mutair (Arabic: محمد براك المطير) was the Deputy Speaker of the Kuwaiti National Assembly, representing the second district. Born in 1969, Al-Mutair earned a BA in business management and worked for an investment company before being elected to the National Assembly in 2003.

== Forgiving Iraq's debt opposition ==
Al-Mutair opposes forgiving Iraq's debt, saying, "A commitment is a commitment; we have suffered enough from that neighbor." The estimated debt of $15–16 billion came mostly from loans made to Iraq during the Iran–Iraq War.

== Request to grill Prime Minister Nasser ==
In November 2008, Al-Mutair joined with fellow Islamist MPs Waleed Al-Tabtabaie and Mohammed Hayef Al-Mutairi in filing a request to grill Prime Minister Nasser Al-Mohammed Al-Sabah for allowing prominent Iranian Shiite cleric Mohammad Baqir al-Fali to enter Kuwait despite a legal ban.
