= Kuwait Chamber of Commerce and Industry =

Institution for business and industry in Kuwait

Coordinates: 29°22′18″N 47°58′53″E

State of Kuwait Kuwait Chamber of Commerce and Industry (KCCI)
- غرفة تجارة وصناعة الكويت
- Emblem of Kuwait

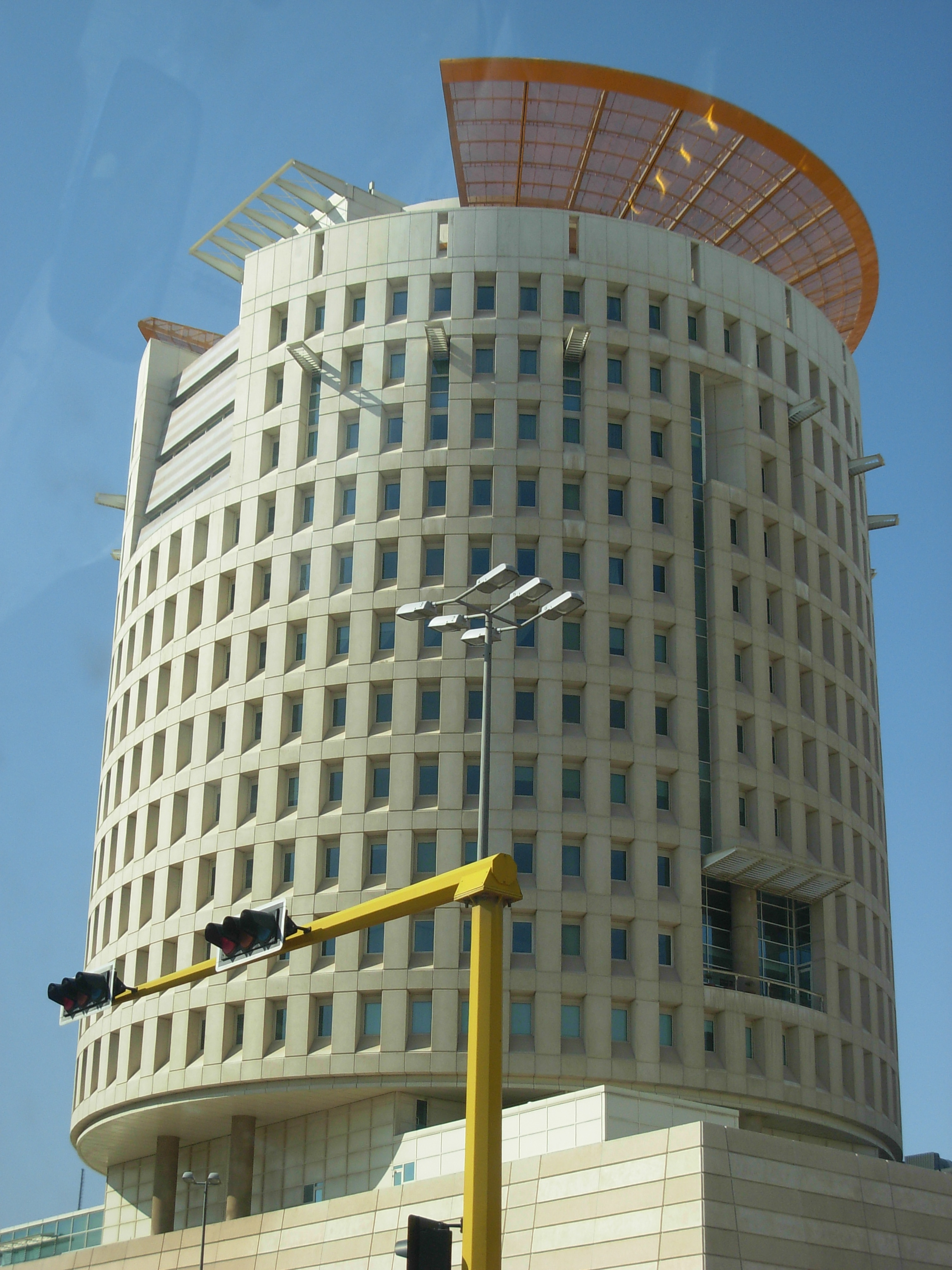
- Main Building

Agency overview
- Headquarters: Kuwait City
- Employees: 140
- Agency executives: - Mohammed Jassem Al-Sager, Chairman; - Abdul Wahab Mohammed Al-Wazzan, 1st Vice Chairman; - Fahd Yacoub Youssef Al-Jouan, 2nd Vice Chairman
- Website: https://www.kuwaitchamber.org.kw

Kuwait Chamber of Commerce and Industry (KCCI; Arabic: غرفة تجارة وصناعة الكويت) is a non-government institution representing business establishments in Kuwait. The Chamber acts on the behalf of, represents and lobbies for the interests of businesspersons and industrialists in Kuwait.

== History ==
The establishment of a Chamber of Commerce was first mooted in 1952. Three years later in 1955 the Chamber was established and in 1959, the election of the Chamber’s first Board of Directors took place.

KCCI is a truly democratic organisation. The members of the board of directors are all elected and its leading figures are known for their contribution to industry and business. The KCCI growth kept in line with the country’s growth.

== About KCCI ==
KCCI is a non-profit, self-financed private institution. Currently the registered members exceeds 79000 and represents the general assembly. The general assembly elects 24 members for the board of directors for a period of 4 years, half of whom are elected every two years. Subscriptions and authentication fees are the main resources of income. The President and the Board Members are considered volunteers for public services. The Chamber is a consultative entity in all economic affairs.

== Branches ==
There are nine branches

1. Main Branch, Kuwait City
2. Ministries Complex, Kuwait City
3. Liberation Tower, Kuwait City
4. Khaitan
5. Jleeb Al Shuyoukh
6. Jaber Al Ali
7. Jahara
8. Al Sadeeq
9. Eshbelia

== See also ==
- Qatar Chamber of Commerce and Industry
- Islamabad Chamber of Commerce & Industry
- London Chamber of Commerce & Industry
- List of company registers
