= Marzouq Al-Ghanim =

Kuwaiti National Assembly member

- مرزوق علي الغانم
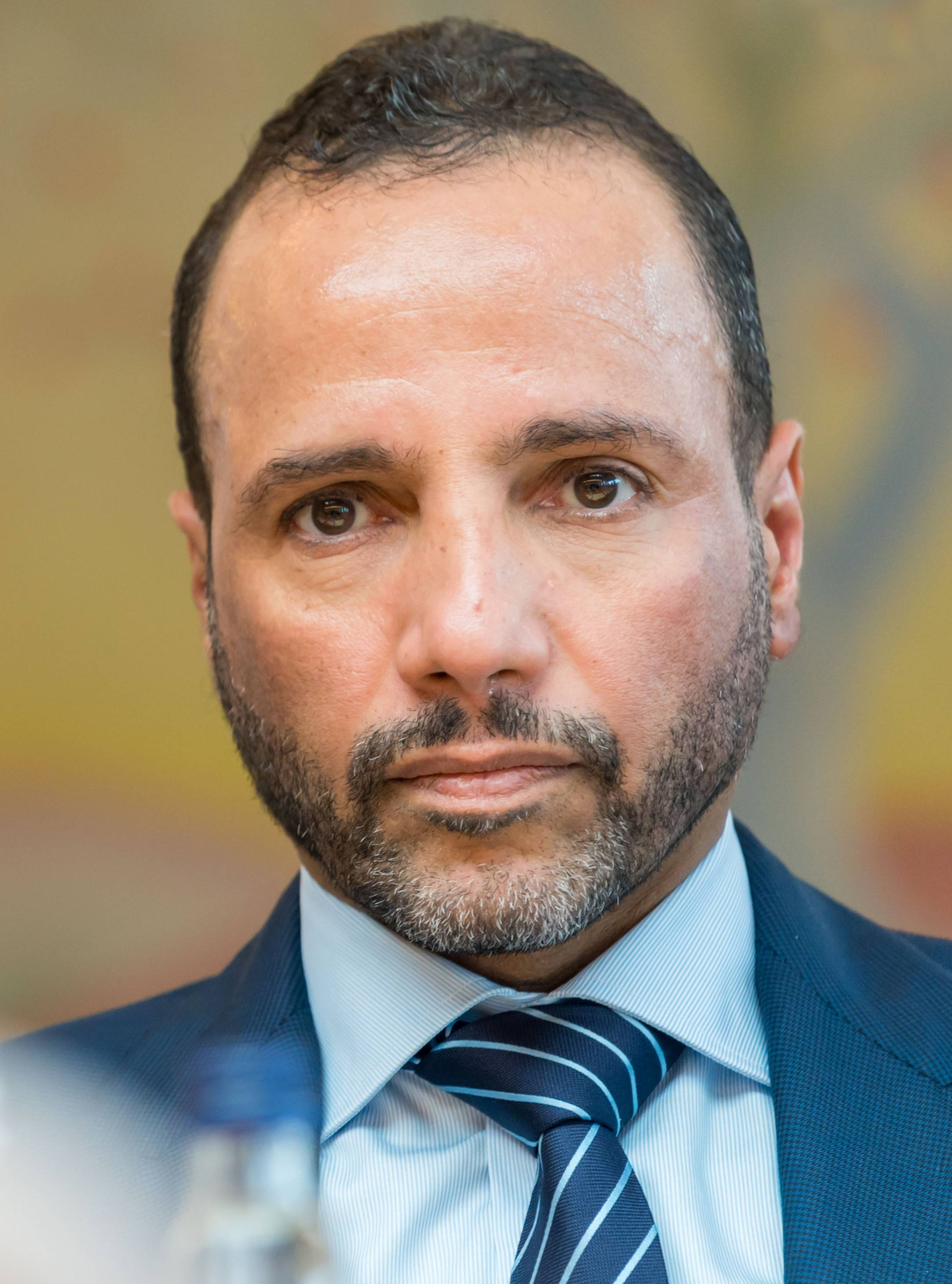
- Al-Ghanim in 2022

Speaker of the National Assembly
- In office March 19, 2023 – May 1, 2023
- Preceded by: Ahmed al-Sadoun (Note: On March 19, 2023, the Constitutional Court annulled the 2022 legislative election and reinstated the National Assembly elected in 2020, of which al-Ghanim was Speaker.)
- Succeeded by: Ahmed al-Sadoun
- In office August 6, 2013 – August 2, 2022
- Preceded by: Ali al-Rashid
- Succeeded by: Ahmed al-Sadoun

Member of the Kuwait National Assembly
- In office March 19, 2023 – May 10, 2024
- Constituency: Second District
- In office August 6, 2013 – August 2, 2022
- Constituency: Second District
- In office July 12, 2006 – October 7, 2012
- Constituency: Second District

Personal details
- Born: November 3, 1968 (age 57) Kuwait
- Citizenship: Kuwait
- Parents: Ali al-Ghanim (father); Faiza al-Kharafi (mother)
- Education: Seattle University

Marzouq Ali Mohammed Al-Ghanim (Arabic: مرزوق علي محمد ثنيان الغانم, romanized: Marzūq ʿAlī Muḥammad Ṯunayān al-Ghānim, born 3 November 1968) is a former speaker of the Kuwaiti National Assembly, representing the second district. Al-Ghanim earned a BSc in mechanical engineering from Seattle University and worked for Boubyan Petrochemical Company before being elected to the National Assembly in 2006. He is the son of Ali al-Ghanim and Faiza al-Kharafi. He was elected Speaker in 2013.

== Family background ==
Marzouq Al-Ghanim is part of the Al-Ghanim family, which is historically dominant in Kuwait and Bahrain. Ethnically, the Al-Ghanim family are part of the Bani Utub federation which originally founded Kuwait. The Bani Utub elite includes the Al Sabah ruling family. Marzouq Al-Ghanim's father, Ali Mohammed Thunayan Al-Ghanim is the chairman of Ali Alghanim & Sons Company, a multi-line conglomerate which includes the BMW and Land Rover car dealership in Kuwait, and is formerly the chairman of the Kuwait Chamber of Commerce and Industry. His paternal uncle, Fouad Mohammed Thunayan Alghanim, is chairman of Fouad Alghanim & Sons Group of Companies, a multi-line conglomerate consisting of a number of fully and partly owned subsidiary companies based in the U.S., Europe, Africa and the Middle East. Marzouq Al-Ghanim's mother, Faiza Al-Kharafi, is a former rector of Kuwait University and heir to the M. A. Kharafi & Sons conglomerate. His maternal uncle, Jassem Al-Kharafi was speaker of the Kuwait National Assembly for 12 years. He has three sons and a daughter, the eldest being Ali.

== Political career ==
On December 19, 2006, parliament voted 39–20 to reject a bill that would have seen the government write off $27bn of its citizens' private debts. Marzouq al-Ghanem voted against the bill, telling the assembly, "What do we tell those who did not borrow? What do we tell those who paid back their loans or part of their loans?"

On April 25, 2007, MP Saleh Ashour called in a statement for reopening Kuwait's embassy in Baghdad and for strongly supporting the government in Baghdad. But al-Ghanim said he believes that it was too early to reopen the Kuwaiti embassy in Baghdad and that this issue should wait until security situations improve.

On February 8, 2008, al-Ghanim, as head of the Youth and Sports Committee, agreed reform the Kuwaiti football program in line with the recommendations of FIFA. In November 2007, FIFA had suspended Kuwait from all international matches because of governmental interference in the national football program. The dispute originated with Kuwait's October 9 elections for key posts in the country's soccer federation. FIFA and the Asian Football Confederation (AFC) refused to recognise the polls. FIFA said Kuwait had ignored the two bodies' "road map" of reforms requiring them to set up an interim board to organize fresh elections and draft new guidelines to prevent governmental interference in the game.

On September 28, 2008, al-Ghanim, along with MPs Abdullah Al-Roumi, Ali Al-Rashid, and Adel Al-Saraawi have proposed a draft law which suggests that the government fund Kuwaiti students' higher education at private colleges. According to the bill, the government would bear half of the expenses for students enrolled in private universities in Kuwait, excluding Kuwait University.

On December 28, 2008, Marzouq Al-Ghanim along with many other lawmakers protested in front of the National Assembly building against the attacks by Israel on Gaza. Protesters burned Israeli flags, waved banners reading, "No to hunger, no to submission" and chanted "Allahu Akbar". Israel launched air strikes into the Gaza Strip on December 26 after a six-month ceasefire ended on December 18.

In October 2017, Al-Ghanim, speaking at an Inter-Parliamentary Union meeting in St. Petersburg, Russia, stated that the Israeli delegation "represents the most dangerous form of terrorism: state terrorism" and told the Israeli delegates to get their things and leave the hall. The Israeli delegation did leave after overwhelming applause from parliamentarians from other countries present at the meeting.

On February 8, 2020, Al-Ghanim threw a copy of the US so-called "deal of the century" in the bin, during the emergency conference of the Arab Parliamentary Union, held in the Jordanian capital Amman. He further stressed that it "was born dead" and "should be thrown in the dustbin of history".

== Other posts ==
- President of the GCC Parliamentary Union 2018–2023
- President of the Arab Inter-Parliamentary Union 2013–2016
- President of the Arab Geopolitical Group of the IPU 2013–2016
- Vice-President of the IPU, Representative of the Arab Group on the Executive Committee of the IPU 2011–2012
- Chairman of the financial and Economic Committee 2012
- Member of the Committee on Budget and Final Accounts 2009/2012
- Vice-President of Kuwait Inter-Parliamentary Group 2011
- Chairman of the Committee on Foreign Affairs 2009
- Member of the committee on Financial and Economic Affairs 2006/2008/2009
- Member of the committee on the response to the Amiri Speech 2008/2009
- Rapporteur of the investigation committee in the circumstances of a citizen's death during police investigations 2009
- Member of the Arab transitional Parliament 2007/2011
- Chairman of the committee on Youth and Sports 2006/2008
- Member of the committee on protection of public Fund 2006
- Honorary President of Kuwait Sports Club 2002–2008
- Member of the Kuwaiti Engineers Association
- Member of the Mechanical Engineers Association

== Notes ==
Political offices
Preceded by Ali Al-Rashid	Speaker of Kuwait National Assembly; 2013–2023	Succeeded by Ahmed al-Sadoun
