= Kuwait National Assembly no-confidence votes =

Kuwait National Assembly No-Confidence Votes are a process of questioning Cabinet ministers, which can lead to their impeachment. The government usually avoids impeachment through resignations, reshuffles and dissolving the legislature. Since its inception in 1962, the National Assembly of Kuwait has questioned more than 30 ministers, forcing some to resign, but only done so with a premier once on March 28, 2012.

== First National Assembly ==
=== Social Affairs and Labor Minister Abdullah Meshari Al-Roudhan ===
MP Mohammed Ahmad Al-Rshaid requested to grill the minister but later reached an agreement and withdrew his request.

=== Electricity and Water Minister Sheikh Jaber Al-Ali Al-Salem Al-Sabah ===
MP Rashed Saleh Al-Tawhid discussed the grilling but no proposals were made and the National Assembly shifted to consider its agenda.

== Second National Assembly ==
=== Justice Minister Khaled Al-Jassar ===
MPs Suleiman Al-Duwaikh, Hamad Al-Ayyar and Nasser Al-Osaimi discussed the grilling over two sessions and no further decision was taken. Some MPs requested formation of inquiry committee and this request was not approved and the session was adjourned.

== Third National Assembly ==
=== Finance and Oil Minister Abdul Rahman Salem Al-Ateeqi ===
The minister was grilled by MP Khaled Mas’oud Al-Fuhaid but was not impeached.

=== Commerce and Industry Minister Khaled Suleiman Al-Adasani ===
MPs Ali Thnayyan Al-Ghanem, Sami Al-Mnayyis and Abdullah Al-Naibari grilled the minister. The minister survived the ensuing no-confidence vote.

=== Finance and Oil Minister Abdul Rahman Salem Al-Ateeqi ===
MPs Ahmad Al-Nafisi, Abdullah Al-Naibari and Salem Al-Marzouk grilled the minister. The minister survived the ensuing no-confidence vote.

== Fifth National Assembly ==
=== Health Minister Dr. Abdul Rahman Al-Awadi ===
MP Khalifa Talal Al-Jiri led the discussion in favor of grilling the minister. The minister declined to present data based on the secrecy of relations between physicians and patients and the issue was referred to the Constitutional Court, which ruled in favor of the minister. This was the first time a minister referred such an issue to the Constitutional Court.

=== Social Affairs and Labor Minister Hamad Issa Al-Rujaib ===
MPs Khaled Sultan Al-Issa, Meshari Al-Anjari and Khaled Al-Jumaiaan led the calls for a grilling. The grilling request was withdrawn due to security circumstances surrounding the aftermath of the 1983 bombings.

=== Electricity and Water Minister Khalaf Al-Khalaf ===
MP Ahmad Al-Tukahim grilled the minister and was satisfied enough by the minister's answers to withdraw the request for a no-confidence vote.

== Sixth National Assembly ==
=== Justice and Legal Affairs Minister Sheikh Salman Al-Duaij Al-Sabah ===
MPs Mubarak Al-Duwaila, Dr. Ahmad Al-Rubei and Hamad Al-Jouaan requested a grilling and on May 7, 1985, the minister resigned two days before the grilling was to take place. This was the second ruling family minister to be grilled and resign.

=== Communications Minister Issa Al-Mazidi ===
MPs Mohammed Suleiman Al-Mirshid, Faisal Al-Sane, and Ahmad Baqer made the request.

=== Finance and Economy Minister Jassem Al-Khrafi ===
MP Nasser Al-Bannai made the request.

=== Oil and Industry Minister Sheikh Ali Al-Khalifa Al-Sabah ===
MPs Abdullah Al-Nafisi, Jassem Al-Qitami, and Meshari Al-Anjari grilled the minister. In response, the Emir dissolved the National Assembly on July 3, 1986. This was the ruling family minister to be grilled.

=== Education and Higher Education Minister Dr. Hassan Al-Ibrahim ===
MPs Rashed Al-Hjailan, Ahmad Al-Shraiaan and Mubarak Al-Duwaila grilled the minister listed on the agenda but the National Assembly was dissolved on July 3, 1986, and the grilling did not take place.

== Seventh National Assembly ==
=== Education and Higher Education Minister Dr. Ahmad Al-Rubei ===
MP Mufarrej Nahar Al-Mutairi grilled the minister. The minister survived the vote of no confidence. This was the third elected minister to be grilled and first elected minister against whom a vote of no confidence motion was submitted.

== Eighth National Assembly ==
=== Second Deputy Prime Minister/Finance Minister Nasser Al-Roudhan ===
MPs Sami Al-Mnayyis, Ahmad Al-Mlaifi and Meshari Al-Osaimi grilled the minister but failed to get the required number of signatories for the vote of no confidence motion. However, the minister resigned on November 15, 1997.

=== Information Minister Sheikh Saud Al-Nasser Al-Sabah ===
MPs Dr. Walid Al-Tabtabaei, Mohammed Al-Elaim and Dr. Fahd Al-Khanna grilled the minister but the cabinet resigned one day before the vote of no confidence was to take place. After the cabinet was reformed, the minister was reappointed to the cabinet as the oil minister and acting health minister. This was the first cabinet resignation and the fourth ruling family minister to be grilled.

=== Interior Minister Sheikh Mohammed Al-Khaled Al-Sabah, June 1998 ===
MP Sayed Hussein Al-Qallaf grilled the minister on June 15, 1998. This was the fifth ruling family minister to be grilled.

=== Justice Minister/Awqaf and Islamic Affairs Minister Ahmad Al-Kulaib, May 1999 ===
MP Abbas Al-Khdhari grilled the minister on May 4, 1999. 20 MPs submitted two votes of no confidence motions against the minister. Subsequently, the National Assembly was dissolved. This was the first constitutional dissolution of the parliament. Al-Kulaib was the fourth elected minister to be grilled and second elected minister against whom a vote of no confidence motion was submitted. It was first time two votes of no confidence motions were submitted.

== Ninth National Assembly ==
=== Electricity and Water Minister/State Minister for Housing Affairs Dr. Adel Al-Sabih ===
MPs Walid Al-Jiri, Musallam Al-Barrak and Marzouk Al-Hbaini grilled the minister. The minister survived the no confidence vote.

=== Minister Al-Hashel, January 2001 ===
MP Sayid Al-Qallaf was to grill the minister on January 27, 2001. However, the cabinet resigned before the grilling could take place.

=== Justice Minister/Awqaf and Islamic Affairs Minister Ahmad Baqer, January 2002 ===
MP Sayid Hussein Al-Qallaf grilled the minister on January 8, 2002. This was the fifth elected minister to be grilled and the second time the government sought interpretation of certain articles from the Constitutional Court.

=== Education and Higher Education Minister Dr. Musaed Al-Haroun, April 2002 ===
MP Hassan Jowhar grilled the minister on April 2, 2002.

=== Finance Minister Dr. Yousef Al-Ibrahim, June 2002 ===
MP Musallam Al-Barrak and Mubarak Al-Duwaila grilled the minister on June 24, 2002. The result of the vote of no confidence motion was in favor of the minister. However, the minister resigned on January 25, 2003.

=== Electricity and Water Minister/Social Affairs and Labor Minister Talal Al-Ayyar, December 2002 ===
MP Sayid Hussein Al-Qallaf grilled minister on December 16, 2002. It was the sixth elected minister to be grilled.

=== Deputy Prime Minister/State Minister for Cabinet and National Assembly Affairs Mohammed Sharar, March 2003 ===
MP Abdulla Al-Naibari grilled the minister on March 3, 2003, and the result of the no confidence motion was in favor of the minister.

=== Deputy Prime Minister/Defense Minister Sheikh Jaber Al-Mubarak Al-Sabah, May 2003 ===
MP Ahmad Nassar Al-Shraiaan was to grill the minister on May 12, 2003, but the MP withdrew his request one day beforehand.

== Tenth National Assembly ==
=== Finance Minister Mahmoud Al-Nuri, March 2004 ===
MP Musallam Al-Barrak grilled the minister on March 8, 2004. The minister tendered his resignation last year after he narrowly survived the no-confidence vote.

=== Health Minister Mohammed Al-Jarallah, May 2004 ===
MP Sayid Hussein Al-Qallaf was to grill the minister on May 3, 2004.

=== Prime Minister/State Minister for Cabinet Affairs/State Minister for National Affairs Mohammed Dhaifallah Sharar ===
MPs Ahmad Al-Mulaifi and Ali Al-Rashed were to grill the minister on December 6, 2004.

=== Information Minister Mohammed Abulhassan, January 2005 ===
On May 23, 2004, MP Al-Tabtabaie threatened to grill minister Abulhassan over allowing the Star Academy television show into Kuwait. MPs Awad Barad, Walid Al-Tabtabaei and Faisal Al-Mislim were supposed to grill the minister on January 3, 2005, but 24 hours before the grilling the minister resigned. In February, Anas Al-Reshaid was appointed the new information minister.

=== Justice Minister Ahmad Baqer, January 2005 ===
MP Jamal Al-Omar grilled the minister on January 10, 2005.

=== Health Minister Mohammed Al-Jarallah, April 2005 ===
MP Daifallah Bouramiya accused the minister of squandering public funds and grilled him for twelve hours on April 4, 2005. On April 6, Al-Jarallah resigned rather than face a no-confidence vote.

=== Prime Minister Shaykh Nasser Mohammed Al-Ahmad Al-Sabah, May 2006 ===
MPs Ahmad Al-Saadoun, Ahmad Al-Mulaifi, and Faisal Al-Muslim Al-Otaib sought to grill the Prime Minister. In response, the Emir dissolved the National Assembly on May 21, 2006.

== Eleventh National Assembly ==
=== Information Minister Mohammed Al-San’ousi, December 2006 ===
On December 17, 2006, Information Minister Mohammed al-Sanoussi resigned, a day before he was scheduled to be grilled by MP Faisal Al-Muslim Al-Otaib over allegations that he tried to restrict satellite TV stations during this year's legislative elections.

Al-Sanoussi denied he curbed the private TV channels, saying that he only asked them to apply for licenses. In Kuwait, all publications and broadcasting media have to be licensed. Several privately owned satellite stations, operated from abroad, appeared in Kuwait before the June elections, broadcasting interviews with opposition figures and covering the campaign. Most subsequently went off the air.

Faisal Al-Muslim Al-Otaib led the campaign against Al-Sanoussi, claiming that al-Sanoussi wrote to the Interior Ministry, asking it to find out who owned the new TV stations so that this "sensitive and dangerous" situation could be dealt with. In the written request to question Al-Sanoussi, Al-Muslim said, "What the information minister did was against the principles of freedom, and against the constitution that guarantees freedom of speech, expression and publication." Al-Muslim also accused the minister of failing to suppress publications that were anti-Islamic and promoting vice.

=== Health Minister Health Minister Shaykh Ahmad Abdullah Al-Ahmad, February 2007 ===
MPs Waleed Al-Tabtabaie, Jamaan Al-Hirbish, and Ahmad Al-Shihoumi grilled the minister in February 2007, questioning him about allegations of favoritism, deteriorating health services offered by state hospitals, and wasting public money by sending people for treatment abroad at the country's expense when they could be treated at home. The minister defended himself against accusations of mismanagement and incompetence, acknowledging he made mistakes and has asked the prosecutor general to investigate. But lawmakers were unconvinced and decided he should face a vote of no confidence. The cabinet then resigned on March 4, one day before the vote of no confidence was to take place.

=== Oil Minister Sheik Ali Al Jarrah Al Sabah, June 2007 ===
MPs Musallam Al-Barrak, Abdulla Al-Roumi, and Adel Al-Saraawi grilled the minister, who then resigned before a no-confidence vote could be held.

=== Health Minister Maasuma Al-Mubarak, August 2007 ===
On August 25, 2007, Faisal Al-Muslim Al-Otaib and Islamist MP Waleed Al-Tabtabaie submitted to Speaker Jassem Al-Kharafi a motion to grill Health Minister Maasouma Al-Mubarak following the August 23 Jahra Hospital fire which led to the death of two elderly patients. However, the minister resigned before she could be grilled.

The first angle of the grilling accused Dr Maasouma of committing violations in the Foreign Medical Treatment Department and toying with ministerial law 2007/25 issued by the minister after assuming office. Indicating according to the law only those patients with diseases for which treatment is not available in Kuwait can be sent for treatment abroad according to the recommendation of a specialized panel of doctors and the physicians in charge of the patient, the MPs said in their grilling motion "as per the law the Health Minister and undersecretaries of health cannot interfere in the decision. However, this law was never implemented and was repeatedly violated under the minister's supervision."

=== Finance Minister Bader Al-Humaidhi, October 2007 ===
MP Dhaifallah Bouramya grilled the minister on October 22, 2007.

=== Awqaf and Islamic Affairs Minister/Justice Minister Dr. Abdulla Al-Ma’touq, October 2007 ===
MPs Walid Al-Tabtabaei and Ali Al-Omair submitted their request to grill the minister on October 22, 2007.

== Twelfth National Assembly ==
=== Prime Minister Nasser Al-Mohammed Al-Sabah, November 2008 ===
MPs Walid Al-Tabtabei, Abdulla Al-Barghash and Mohammed Hayef Al-Mutairi submitted a request on November 18, 2008, to grill the Prime Minister based on overriding security records, absence of the State's prestige, and government confusion in running the affairs of the state and increase in rates of financial and administrative corruption. In response, the cabinet resigned in protest.

=== Prime Minister Nasser, February 2009 ===
In February 2009, the ICM announced its intentions to grill PM Nasser. On February 5, 2009, Al-Qabas quoted MP Ashour as saying that he suspected that the plan to grill Prime Minister Nasser is a plot between the cabinet and the ICM. At the same time, MP Al-Tabtabaei advised the Salafi MPs to support ICM's grilling.
