= Mohammed Al-Sager =

Kuwaiti journalist and politician

Mohammed Jassem Al-Sager
- محمد جاسم الصقر

Chairman of the Kuwait Chamber of Commerce and Industry
- In office 2020–Present

Chairman of the Arab Parliament
- In office 2005–1999

Member of the National Assembly of Kuwait
- In office 1999–2009

Personal details
- Born: 18 June 1951 (age 75)
- Party: National Democratic Alliance
- Education: Whittier College
- Occupation: banker, journalist, politician
- Known for: founder of Al-Qabas and Al-Jarida

Mohammed Jassem Al-Sager (Arabic: محمد جاسم الصقر; born 18 June 1951) is a Kuwaiti journalist, businessman, and politician.

== Background ==
Al-Sager received a bachelor's degree in economics from Whittier College (California, US) in 1975. He then worked for five years at the Industrial Bank of Kuwait, where he became Corporate Finance Manager. In 1980, he left the bank to become Chairman and Managing Director of Coast Investment & Development Co.

== Journalism ==
In 1983 he began working as a journalist, serving as editor-in-chief of Al-Qabas (English: "The Firebrand"), a daily newspaper. He continued in the role until his election to Parliament in 1999. In 1992 he was awarded the International Press Freedom Award of the Committee to Protect Journalists "for courageous reporting on political and human rights issues in the face of government threats of censorship and prosecution".

Along with colleague Ibrahim Marzouk, he was sentenced to six months in prison in 1998 on charges of "insulting the essence of the Divine Being", following the publication of a joke on Al-Qabas's "Entertainment" page: "Why did God expel Adam and Eve from paradise? Because they did not pay the rent." The newspaper was also closed for one week. The Committee to Protect Journalists protested the men's sentences, which were overturned by an appeals court in January 1999.

== Political career ==
Al-Sager served in the National Assembly of Kuwait from 1999 to 2009. While political parties are technically illegal in Kuwait, Al-Sager affiliates with the liberal National Democratic Alliance party.

From 2005 to 2009, he also served as Chairman of the Arab Parliament, in which role he worked with King Abdullah of Saudi Arabia and President Hosni Mubarak of Egypt to promote a reconciliation between battling Palestinian factions Hamas and Fatah.

Al-Sager is also a member of the General Secretariat of the New York-based Council on Foreign Relations.

In May 2009, Al-Sager joined several other Kuwaiti MPs in declining to run for re-election to the Kuwaiti National Assembly. Al-Sager stated that he believed the next parliament would "also fail to implement the awaited reforms", these being an economic stimulus bill and a boost to the country's infrastructure.

In April 2020, Al Sager was elected Chairman of the board of the Kuwait Chamber of Commerce and Industry.
