= Women in Kuwait =

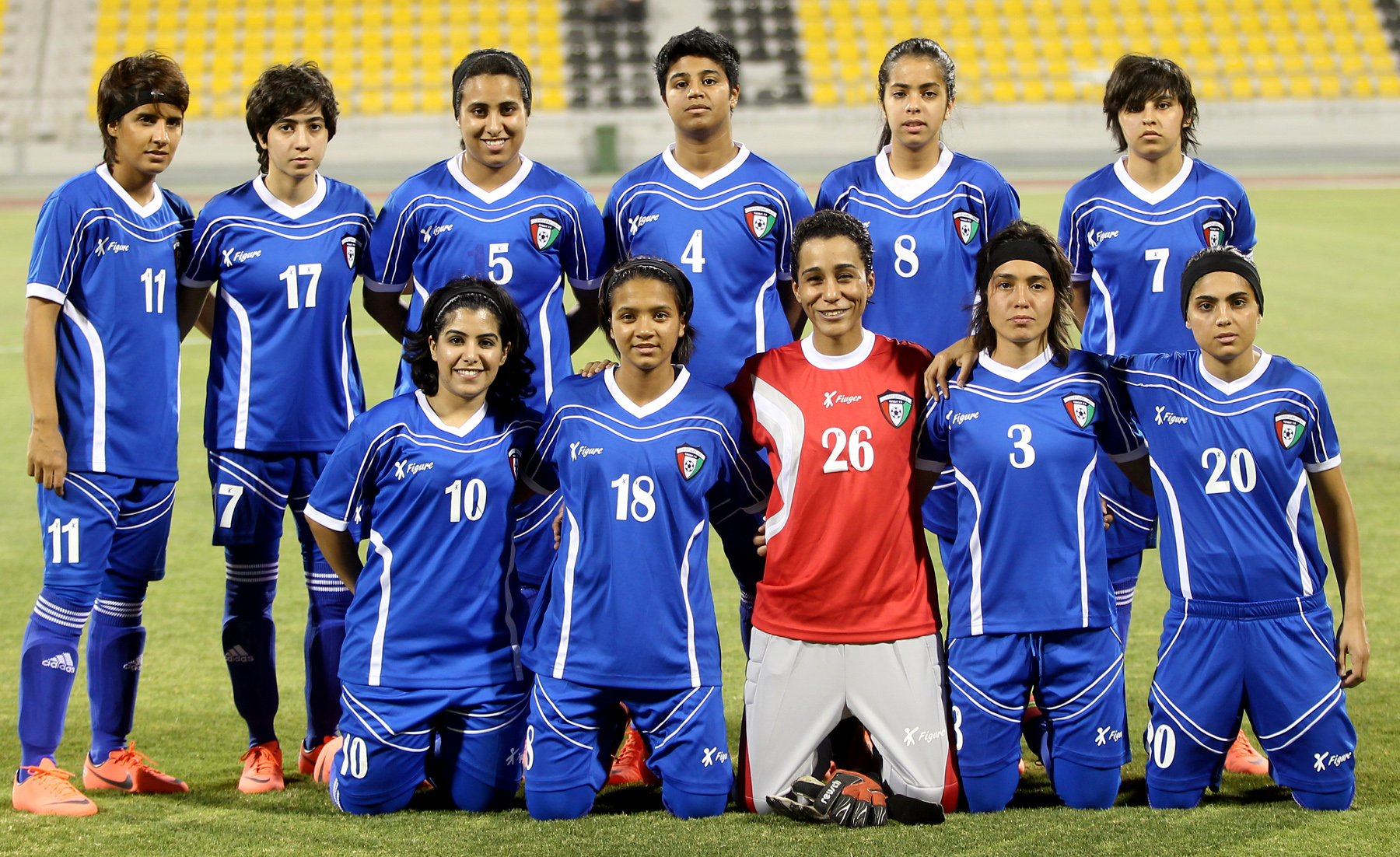
- Kuwaiti women's football team (2012)

General statistics
- Maternal mortality (per 100,000): 12 (2020)
- Women in parliament: 4.8% (2020)
- Women over 25 with secondary education: 60,9% (2021)
- Women in labour force: 72,00% (2022)

Gender Inequality Index
- Value: 0.305 (2021)
- Rank: 74th out of 191

Global Gender Gap Index (2022)
- Value: 0.632 (2022)
- Rank: 130th out of 146

The women of Kuwait have experienced many progressive changes since the early 20th century. Since then, women have had increased access to education, gained political and economic rights, and financial power. They can serve in the police, military, and as judges in courts. However, women in Kuwait struggle against a patriarchal culture which discriminates against them in several fields. Kuwait's Bedoon (stateless) women are at risk of significant human rights abuses and persecution. Kuwait has the largest number of Bedoon in the entire region.

According to the Civil Service Commission (CSC) data in 2024, the joblessness trend among Kuwaitis was found to significantly increase year after year. Major contributors to this trend include a rise in graduates from fields not sought by the labor market, poor linkage between skillsets acquired in these specializations and labor market demands, and insufficient attention to the private sector combined with inadequate coordination between concerned authorities. As of November 2023, the total unemployed Kuwaitis numbered 8,727, with women making up approximately 52 percent.

== History ==
=== Pre-oil Kuwait ===
From the 17th century until the discovery of oil in the late 1940s, the economy of Kuwait was largely dependent on maritime trade. While men were seafaring, Kuwait's women managed their homes, and controlled family affairs and finances. For those families that could afford it, houses were built with a courtyard and a harem where women spent most of their time. This structure, along with high windows and doors that faced into the house rather than the street, removed women from public vision. Upper-class women's participation in the public sphere was very limited. However, lower-class women had a much less secluded experience; they went to the suq on a daily basis, fetched drinking water, and regularly washed their families’ clothes on the beach.

Kuwaiti girls began learning scripture in 1916 when the first Quran school was established. After this many women of modest means began working as Islamic instructors. The first private school opened in 1926; it taught reading, writing, and embroidery. Public schooling began in 1937 though enrollment in it was low for some time; however, by the 1940s many young Kuwaiti women were enrolled in primary school. It was often women themselves who pushed for these educational advances and opportunities and in 1956 a group of young women burned their abaya to protest their right to go abroad to study.

=== Political activism and emancipation ===
Women's rights activism began in Kuwait in the 1950s with the establishment of many women's groups (lijân nisâ’iah). Noureya Al-Saddani established the first of these groups, the Arab Women's Renaissance Association (later, Family Renaissance Association), in 1962. The Women's Cultural and Social Society followed a year later in February 1963. In 1975, The Girls Club (Nadi Alfatat) was established, advocating for women's sports. In 1971, Al-Saddani as head of the Arab Women's Development Society, began a national campaign for women's suffrage. Her initial proposal was rejected by the National Assembly.

During the liberal nationalist era in the 1950s and 1960s, the unveiling of Kuwaiti women was viewed as a natural part of the progress of Kuwait as a new independent nation; Kuwaiti feminists like Lulwah Al-Qatami and Fatima Hussain burned their veils and abaya in public. The majority of Kuwaiti women did not wear the hijab in the 1960s and 1970s. At Kuwait University throughout the 1960s and most of the 1970s, miniskirts were more common than the hijab. This development gradually turned around due to the growing Islamization of Kuwaiti society, which made veiling the norm again by the mid-to-late 1990s. In 1978, Sheikha Latifa Al-Sabah, then-wife of Emir Saad Al-Salim Al-Sabah, established the Islamic Care Association, seeking to spread Islam along with the associated lifestyle and conduct of Muslim life. However in recent decades, an increasing number of Kuwaiti women have been unveiling or choosing to not wear the hijab; including the daughter of Kuwaiti Muslim Brotherhood leader Tareq Al-Suwaidan.

During the Gulf War in Kuwait from 1990 to 1991, women played a significant part of resisting the Iraqi invasion, occupation, and supporting the offensive which liberated Kuwait from Iraqi control. This period of conflict also solidified Kuwaiti women from different backgrounds and raised their political awareness. After the war, demonstrations and protests for women's rights continued throughout the decade. A shift began, as more political figures supported the Kuwaiti women's rights proposals, most notably Emir Al-Sabah, whom in May 1999 attempted to institute women's suffrage by decree during a period of parliamentary dissolution; however, this decree was reversed by the newly elected National Assembly in November 1999.

Protests and activism continued and escalated into the 2000s alongside renewed proposals before the legislature, ultimately culminating in a 2004 protest inside the National Assembly building. The following year in 2005, Kuwaiti women held some of the largest demonstrations in their history, and in May 2005, the Assembly voted to give women full political rights to vote and hold office. The first elections Kuwaiti women ran for office and voted in were in June 2006. In 2009, four women were elected to parliament, Massouma A-Mubarak (the female minister appointed), Aseel Al-Awadhi, Rola Dashti, and Salwa Al-Jassar. In 2012, a lawsuit against the Ministry of Justice was resolved, enabling women to hold high positions in the judicial system. In 2014, twenty-two Kuwaiti women were appointed to serve as prosecutors. In 2018, the Kuwait Ministry of Awqaf and Islamic Affairs changed its policies to allow women in senior positions. In December 2019, three women were appointed to cabinet positions, including the first female Minister of Finance in the Persian Gulf region. On 30 June 2020, Kuwaiti Attorney General, Dirar Al-Asousi, approved the promotion of eight female prosecutors to become judges. On 3 September 2020, the eight judges were sworn in as the first female judges in Kuwait's history.

In the 2024 Kuwaiti parliamentary elections, a notable aspect was the active involvement of women as both voters and candidates. The participation of women in the democratic process, exercising their rights as voters and vying for parliamentary seats, garnered significant attention and positive remarks from observers. Although some voters expressed frustration, one voter perspicaciously predicted that only a single female candidate would secure a seat, attributing this to her demonstrated competence during her prior term in parliament. The level of women's participation, both in voting and as candidates for elected office, was highlighted as an important development reflecting the growing political empowerment of Kuwaiti women.

== Demographics and statistics ==
Population statistics according to the United Nations Development Programme 2019 Human Development Report
Statistic	Female	Male
Life expectancy (from birth)	76.5	74.7
Adult mortality rate (Note: The probability in percentage that a 15-year-old person will die before they reach 60 years old.)	56%	92%
Expected future education (years) (Note: What would be expected if born today and current trends told throughout until adulthood.)	14.3	12.9
Average current education (years)	8.0	6.9
Secondary education (% of pop.)	56.8%	49.3%
Adolescent birth rate (per 1000 women, 15–19)	8.2	n/a
Gross income per capita (2011 PPP, USD)	$49,075	$85,615
Rate of participation in labor force	57.5%	85.3%

International rankings

Kuwait's position in international rankings has varied over the years. In 2014, Kuwait was ranked 113 of 142 globally in the Global Gender Gap Report; the country improved its ranking due to significant increases in the overall income indicator. In 2015, Kuwait was ranked 117 of 145 globally in the Global Gender Index. In 2020, Kuwait was ranked 122 of 153 globally in the Global Gender Gap Report. Regarding the GGGR subindex, Kuwait ranked 142 of 152 on political empowerment 143 of 153 on health and survival, 120 of 153 on economic opportunity, and 57 of 153 on educational attainment. In 2021, Kuwait was ranked 143 of 156 globally in the Global Gender Gap Report. Regarding the GGGR subindex, Kuwait ranked 153 of 156 on political empowerment, 94 of 156 on health and survival, 137 of 156 on economic opportunity, and 59 of 156 on educational attainment.

== Legal statutes ==
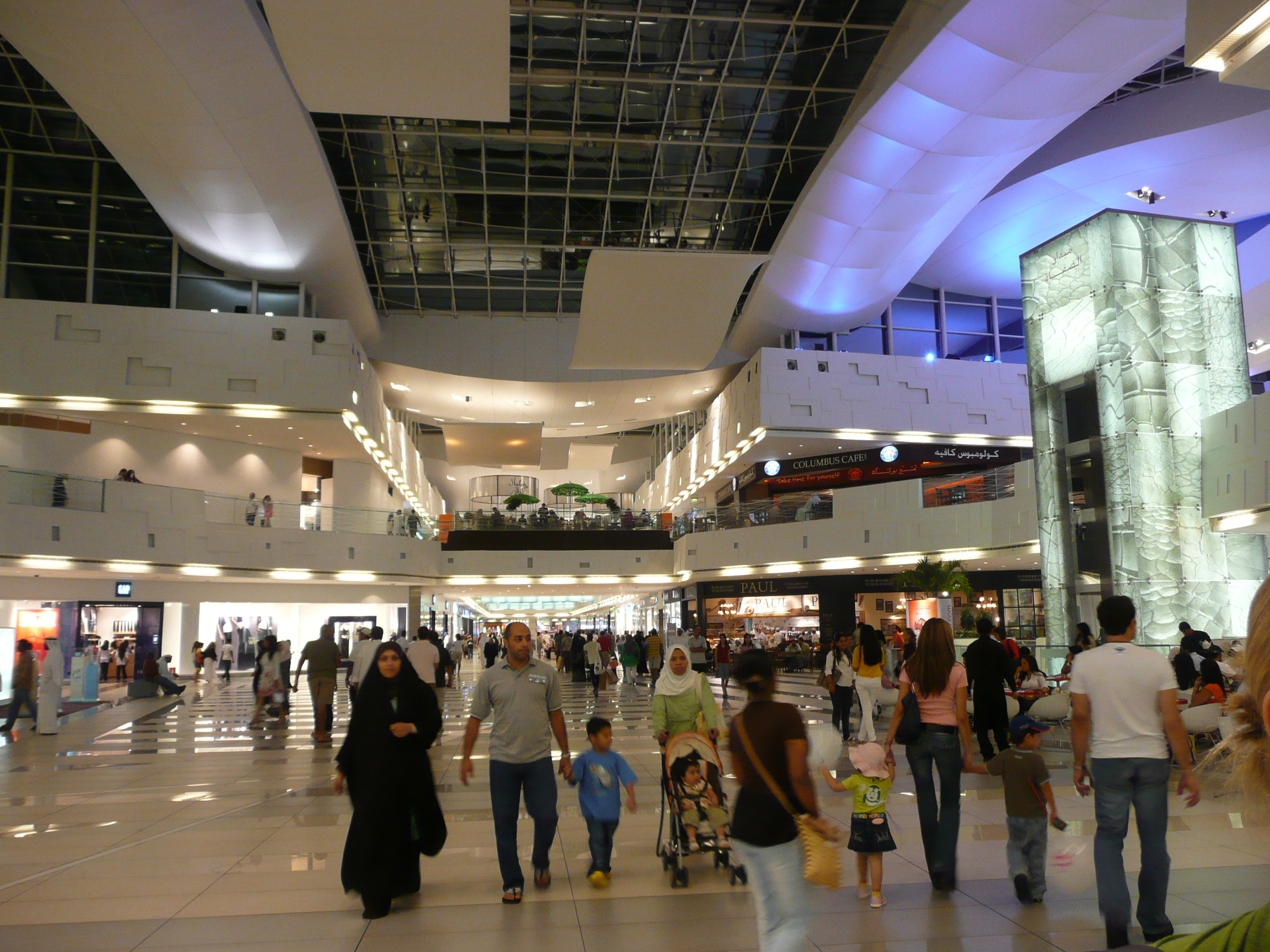
Muslim families in The Avenues, a mall in Al Rai/Shuwaikh Industrial of Kuwait. It is currently Kuwait's largest mall.

=== Citizenship ===
The Nationality Act (1959) grants Kuwaiti men and women equal right to retain their citizenship; however, citizenship is only automatically inherited by children if the father is a Kuwaiti citizen. Women's citizenship is not automatically inherited by children and only becomes so under exceptional circumstances, such as unknown father, divorce, or widowing. Kuwaiti women's citizenship does not transfer to non-Kuwaiti husbands, who must apply for residency, unlike non-Kuwaiti wives of Kuwaiti men who are granted automatic residency and a pathway to citizenship after 15–18 years. As a result, both a non-Kuwaiti husband and any children a Kuwaiti wife has with him experience significant disadvantage— a lack of occupational, familial, and other rights.

In 2024, Kuwait's nationality law was amended, outlawing citizenship by marriage. Previously, under Article 7, women could attain citizenship through marriage to Kuwaiti men after five years.

=== Family law ===
The Kuwaiti Personal Status Act of 1984 (a.k.a. Family Law Act), based in Sunni Islam (Maliki), governs family law in the country. Sharia applies to Muslim citizens and residents, (Note: 2013 estimates indicate 76.7% of the country's population is Muslim.) with different courts and rules for Sunni and Shi’a, a notable difference being Ja’fari applying to the latter group. (Note: Previously, Ja'fari statutes and proceedings were not codified, but still used in Shi'a family courts. On 25 August 2019, these statues were officially codified.) Non-Muslims in Kuwait have their own secular court.

In terms of marriage, Muslim women are not permitted to marry without the permission of a wali, a male guardian, (Note: Typically a close relative of the woman, such as father or eldest brother.) or marry non-Muslim men. (Note: Men are not bound by this restriction and are allowed to marry non-Muslim women.) Only men are allowed as legal witnesses for a marriage. Women's witnessing is either discounted or disallowed, depending on the legal context in question. The minimum age for women to marry is 15, provided approved by the wali. Polygyny is legally permissible and a man may have up to four wives, of which any existing wife(s) have no say in; however, the practice is uncommon. Culturally, forced marriages (ijbar) may also occur without consent of the bride, with attempts at annulment by the bride often met with heavy coercion or threats of prosecution.

In terms of divorce, both husband and wife may seek divorce—the husband may divorce her at will (talaq), (Note: For Sunni men, no witness is required for divorce. For Shi'a men, two male witnesses are required.) while the wife may only seek legal divorce (fasakh) under specific conditions such as lack of financial support, exceptional absence, criminality, husband's deconversion from Islam, or chronic/terminal illness. With permission of her husband, women may also divorce through khul', returning her dowry or the equivalent.

In terms of child custody, the legal guardianship of Muslim children is possessed by the husband of their mother (presumed father) in most cases. In the case of divorce, legal custody remains with the father and physical custody remains with the mother until the children reach a certain age. (Note: For Sunni women, until the child comes of age at 15. For Shi'ite women, until a daughter is 9 or son is 2. For non-Muslim women, until a child is 7.) Any women who remarry or are divorced for adultery typically lose all child custody rights of previous children. (Note: This is not the case for men.) Women who are divorced, widowed, or married to a foreigner may be considered to lead the household.

Abortion is heavily restricted in Kuwait and can only be sought up to 17 weeks of pregnancy for reasons of the mother's health (physical or mental) or fetal deformity/unviability only. Sexual assault, incest, economic needs, and social needs are not valid reasons. Abortion outside of the few allowed is criminalized, carrying between 3 and 15 years incarceration.

In terms of inheritance, Muslim men are entitled to inherit twice as much as women, provided they are on similar relation level to the deceased (such as siblings). Widowed wives do not receive the same inheritance compared to widower husbands.

== Employment and property rights ==
According to the International Monetary Fund in 2013, the share of Kuwaiti women in the workforce was 53 percent which is significantly higher than the MENA average of 21 percent and slightly higher than the world average of 51 percent. Kuwaiti women outnumber men in the workforce and Kuwait has the highest rate of female citizen workforce participation in the GCC. However, working women are at a higher risk of unemployment than men overall at a ratio of 5.11:1. Most working women are in public sector tertiary industry positions. Education and modernization policies have given Kuwaiti women more opportunities in the workforce, albeit they grapple with a patriarchal culture which primarily expects them to prioritize homemaking and child-rearing.

The Kuwait Constitution prohibits slavery and discrimination. Legally, women and men should receive equal pay for equal work, albeit there is a large gender pay gap in Kuwait. According to Kuwaiti labor law, Muslim women are not permitted to work at night (10 p.m to 7 a.m), (Note: Except for hospitals and other healthcare institutions.) at anything considered immoral for women, or at the discretion of a husband if he feels his wife working would negatively impact "family interests". On 25 August 2019, the Ja'fari Personal Status Law was codified, preventing Shi'a husbands from forcing their wife to quit working if she worked before their marriage began. Legally, women and men can own property and exercise rights to their property equally, especially in the case of women who are divorced, widowed, or married to foreigners. Women have the legal right to banking and contract without the consent of males. However, some Muslim women may experience de facto restrictions due to their families.

The Kuwait government subsidizes certain types of finances for divorced or widowed Kuwaiti women provided they have children to care for. The Kuwaiti Labor Law provides women with 70 days of paid maternity leave. (Note: Provided delivery occurs during leave.) and up to four months of optional unpaid leave, during which employment termination is illegal. Additionally, employers with more than 50 female employees must provide infant childcare facilities by law. The Civil Service Committee Decree of 1993 discriminates between women married to Kuwaiti men versus non-Kuwaiti men. Those married to Kuwaiti men are given four months of paid (half typical pay) after their maternity leave; however, those married to non-Kuwaiti men are not.

== Domestic violence ==
Until August 2020, there had been no laws specifically criminalizing domestic violence and marital rape. On 19 August 2020, Kuwait passed the Law on Protection from Domestic Violence criminalizing "physical, psychological, sexual, or financial mistreatment, whether in words or actions" between family members, going into effect the following year of 2021. The act provides for protective orders, shelters, a victim hotline, legal aid, and counseling. According to Human Rights Watch, the new law is not fully comprehensive, only setting penalties for violating victim-sought protective orders and not the actual acts of abuse or violence, and only applying to current legal family relationships, not former partners, those dating or courting, those engaged, or those in unofficial marriages (such as common-law marriage and domestic partnership). Prior to this, a husband's sexual actions with an unconsenting wife were only illegal if they were "unnatural acts".

The Kuwaiti Penal Code theoretically provides reduced or fine-only punishment for a man who commits an 'honor killing' of a female relative found committing adultery (zina), (Note: The crime of adultery (zina) itself has a higher sentencing standard than the honor killing, typically 5–15 years incarceration or a higher fine.) a provision that conflicts with the Constitution of Kuwait and Islamic Sharia law. A 2016 survey of Arab states in the Persian Gulf region found most women were unaware of this legal provision allowing reduced punishment for honor killings, and 63% rejected its existence. The Code also states if a man kidnaps a woman intending to abuse, rape, pimp, murder, or extort her, he will not receive punishment if he marries the woman with her guardian's (wali) approval, the woman has no say in the matter. Additionally, age of consent does not exist, as sexual acts outside legal marriage are illegal.

It is believed that domestic violence is both common and under-reported despite the country slowly moving towards reducing the problem. A 2019 survey by Orange Kuwait, a non-governmental organization focusing on violence against women, found 82.16 percent of those surveyed believed domestic violence was a significant problem in Kuwait, and 62.91 percent had experienced abuse themselves. Those surveyed were 83.5 percent women. A 2011 study by Kuwait University found 40 percent of women reported at least one instance of physical abuse from their husband. A 2011 survey by the Kuwait Minister of Justice found 35 percent of women reported abuse.

== Arts and creativity ==
Museums and galleries

Kuwait's long tradition of artistic expression has been spearheaded and organized by women. Women's involvement in the fine arts dates back to at least the mid 20th century. In 1969, sister and brother Najat and Ghazi Sultan established The Sultan Gallery, one of Kuwait's oldest art galleries, providing access to both public and professionals, and promoting art and secular understanding. During the Gulf War, it was closed, reopening in 2006 under the direction of Farida Sultan. Currently the Sultan Gallery focuses on a wide range of mediums, but especially photography. Contemporary Kuwaiti artists include Thuraya al Baqsami, who trained in Cairo and Moscow whose works can be found in museums worldwide;

Sheikha Hussa Al-Sabah, wife of Sheikh Nasser Sabah Al-Ahmad Al-Sabah, served as the director of Kuwait National Museum for three decades, establishing Dar al-Athar al-Islamiyyah (lit. transl. House of Islamic Antiquities) in 1983 focusing on antique Islamic artifacts. During the Gulf War, the museum was thoroughly looted by Iraqi forces, returning most of the valuables, though often damaged, after intervention of the United Nations. Following the war in 1992, Sheikha Hussah created the Dar al-Funoon (lit. transl. House of Arts) for contemporary art. Sheikha Lulu Al-Sabah, daughter of Sheikha Paula Al-Sabah and wife of Sheikh Ahmad Al-Sabah (son of Emir Nawaf Al-Sabah), has continued the art advocacy into a new generation, establishing an annual art auction called JAMM in 2010 focusing on contemporary art.

== Non-Kuwaiti women in Kuwait ==
=== Bedoon (stateless) ===
Stateless people of Kuwait are at risk of significant human rights abuses. According to Human Rights Watch, Kuwait has produced 300,000 Bedoon. Kuwait has the largest number of stateless people in the entire region. The Bedoon are at risk of persecution and abuse more than the citizens and expats in Kuwait.

=== Foreign workers ===
Kuwait has a very high percentage of migrant workers. Many Egyptian, Palestinian, Filipino and Southeast Asian women live in Kuwait. Palestinian women have worked in Kuwait since the 1950s, historically as teachers in girls’ schools. Nearly 90% of Kuwaiti households employ a foreigner worker, most often a South Asian woman. These women's labor is crucial to the social reproduction of Kuwait, though they occupy a marginal status and are not granted state protection or oversight. Non-Nationals are subject to residence and labor laws, which prevent them from permanently settling in Kuwait. Under the kafala system, whereby all migrants must have a citizen who sponsors their residence in Kuwait, many migrant workers cannot leave or enter the country without their employer's permission and are often exploited. The system has long been controversial and has "been criticized as a form of bonded labor or even slavery." A United Nations expert even urged Kuwait to abolish this system.

== Notable Kuwaiti women ==
- Noureya Al-Saddani: An author, historian, broadcaster and director, Al-Saddani started the first women's organization in Kuwait. In 1971, she proposed to the National Assembly to grant women's political rights. During the invasion she worked in charity and mobilized the diaspora; upon her return to Kuwait she put together radio biographies of all the female martyrs in the invasion.
- Loulwa Abdulwahab Essa Al-Qatami: Al-Qatami the first woman to study abroad, she left Kuwait on 12 June 1955 for a degree in education. Upon her return, she and a few other Kuwaiti women founded the Women's Cultural and Social Society in 1963. She and the group have been instrumentally active in advancements for women since the 1960s; they work on mobilizing women, raising awareness and philanthropy.
- Khadîjah al-Mahmît – Kuwaiti women's rights activist, author, and public figure of Iranian descent. Her works redefined the intellectual perspective for Kuwaiti women regarding suffrage and other human rights.
- Sara Akbar: Akbar is Kuwait's first Petroleum Engineer in the field. She is a Kuwaiti of Iranian ancestry. During the invasion, Akbar led a group of oil employees to maintain machinery and electricity and after the Iraqi troops left and set several oil fields on fire, Akbar set up a team to control and extinguish the fires, earning her the nickname "firefighter".
- Asrar Al-Qabandi: Al-Qabandi was a martyr of the Iraqi invasion of Kuwait. During the occupation she helped people flee to safety, smuggled weapons and money into Kuwait as well as disks from the Ministry of Civil Information to safety, cared for many wounded by the war, and destroyed monitoring devices used by the Iraqi troops. She was captured and subsequently killed by Iraqi troops in January 1991.
- Huda Ashkanani, poet
- Laila al-Othman is one of Kuwait's most famous authors and columnists. She has written a number of short stories and novels and often deals with themes that challenge traditional norms. She has faced conservative resistance to her work.
- Thuraya Al-Baqsami — internationally acclaimed printmaker, illustrator, and writer. She is a Kuwaiti of Iranian ancestry.
- Shurooq Amin — whose subversive art pieces aim to challenge perceptions of society in the Gulf
- Fatima Al-Qadiri — member of Future Brown, artist, musician and composer inspired by Gulf War experiences She is the daughter of Thuraya Al-Baqsami.
- Monira Al-Qadiri, PhD – internationally recognized mixed-media visual artist, designer, sculptor, and filmmaker; her art is experimental and subversive She is the daughter of Thuraya Al-Baqsami.
- Fareah Al Saqqaf, a feminist activist and civil society advocate. She founded LOYAC in 2002 with 6 Kuwaiti women, a grassroots regional NGO with the aim of creating generations of globally effective leaders. LOYAC re envisions a society that centers youth, women and children to empower them in an ever evolving world and increasingly challenging job market.
- Nadia Ahmad - A journalist, writer and producer, writer of the hit Netflix show “The Exchange” about the first women to penetrate the male dominated world of the Kuwait Stock Exchange. Nadia is a feminist activist, and works in civil society development in Lebanon. She is the daughter of Fareah Al Saqqaf.

== See also ==
- Women's suffrage in Kuwait
- Women in Islam
- Women in the Arab world
- Women in Asia
- Women's rights
