= Human rights in Kuwait =

Human rights in Kuwait are a topic of significant concern. Most recently, Kuwait has been facing significant criticism for its citizenship revocation policy. Additionally, Kuwait's treatment of stateless people has come under substantial criticism from international human rights organisations and the United Nations. Kuwait has the largest stateless population in the entire region. Kuwait also faces criticism for its human rights violations against foreign nationals, women, and LGBT people. Although Kuwaiti law (including the Constitution of Kuwait) theoretically pledges to protect all human rights; the enforcement mechanisms designed to help protect human rights are very limited in Kuwait.

== Treaties ==
Kuwait is a party to several international human rights treaties, including

- International Covenant on Economic, Social and Cultural Rights
- International Covenant on Civil and Political Rights
- Convention on the Elimination of All Forms of Racial Discrimination
- Convention on the Elimination of All Forms of Discrimination against Women
- Supplementary Convention on the Abolition of Slavery, the Slave Trade, and Institutions and Practices Similar to Slavery
- Convention for the Suppression of the Traffic in Persons and of the Exploitation of the Prostitution of Others
- United Nations Convention Against Torture
- Convention on the Rights of the Child
- Convention concerning the Prohibition and Immediate Action for the Elimination of the Worst Forms of Child Labour
- Convention concerning Forced or Compulsory Labour
- Freedom of Association and Protection of the Right to Organize Convention
- Abolition of Forced Labour Convention
- Discrimination (Employment and Occupation) Convention
- Convention against Discrimination in Education

== Citizenship revocation ==
Citizenship revocation is a contentious human rights issue in Kuwait. According to Carnegie Endowment for International Peace, Kuwait has weaponized citizenship revocation as a tool for political control. The government has the authority to revoke Kuwaiti citizenship without a criminal conviction and Kuwait's courts are not allowed to handle appeals. The lack of judicial oversight means that citizenship revocation occurs without a court ruling.

Since March 2024, Kuwait has been revoking the citizenship of many citizens (by decree). In early December 2024, the Emir issued a decree to revoke the Kuwaiti citizenship of several high-profile individuals: singer Nawal Al-Kuwaitia, social media influencer Noha Nabil, and actor Dawood Hussein including his children who were automatically granted Kuwaiti citizenship through paternal affiliation.

By March 2025, Kuwait had revoked the citizenship of 42,000 people in just six months. In October 2025, Mohamad Al-Mail, a political activist and Islamic scholar living in exile in the United Kingdom, was also stripped of his citizenship by decree. In December 2025, it was estimated that as many as 200,000 people have lost their Kuwaiti citizenship. It is one of the largest citizenship revocation policies to ever occur since the Second World War.

The lack of transparency and recourse in the citizenship revocation policy is a violation of international law. The majority of revoked citizenships were legally granted to the wives of Kuwaiti men under Article 8 of the nationality law. Their citizenships are being retroactively revoked after Article 8 was recently repealed by decree, violating international law which prohibits the retroactive application of nationality law. Many individuals with revoked citizenship are taken to the "Central Agency for Illegal Residents," which handles stateless individuals in Kuwait, further deepening the country's stateless population.

Kuwait’s citizenship revocation policy contradicts international treaties such as the Universal Declaration of Human Rights, which states that "everyone has the right to a nationality" and "no one shall be arbitrarily deprived of his nationality." Human rights organizations have raised concerns over the potential for statelessness, lack of due process in citizenship revocations, and the discriminatory impact on vulnerable groups, including women, elderly people, and children. For example, the citizenship revocation policy impacts many children, further deepening the number of stateless children in the country.

Neveen Ma'arafi (Arabic: نيفين معرفي, lit. 'Neveen Ma'arafi') defended the citizenship revocation policy, claiming that it is being carried out to tackle corruption. Many activists disputed her claims.

== Stateless people ==
=== History ===
Kuwait has the largest stateless population in the entire region. Most stateless Bedoon of Kuwait belong to the northern tribes, especially the Al-Muntafiq tribal confederation. The linguist Bruce Ingham studied the northern tribes in Kuwait in the mid 20th century. A minority of stateless Bedoon in Kuwait belong to the 'Ajam community.

Under the terms of Article 4 of the Kuwait Nationality Law, the Bedoon in Kuwait are eligible for Kuwaiti nationality by naturalization. In practice, it is widely believed that Sunnis of Persian descent or tribal Saudis can readily achieve Kuwaiti naturalization whilst Bedoon of Iraqi tribal ancestry cannot. As a result, many Bedoon in Kuwait feel pressured to hide their background.

From 1965 until 1985, the Bedoon were treated as Kuwaiti citizens and guaranteed citizenship: they had free access to education, health care and all the other privileges of citizenship. The stateless Bedoon constituted 80-90% of the Kuwaiti Army in the 1970s and 1980s until the Gulf War.

In 1985 at the height of the Iran–Iraq War, the Bedoon were reclassified as "illegal residents" and denied Kuwaiti citizenship and its accompanying privileges. The Iran–Iraq War threatened Kuwait's internal stability and the authorities feared the sectarian background of the stateless Bedoon. The Bedoon issue in Kuwait "overlaps with historic sensitivities about Iraqi influence inside Kuwait", with many of those denied Kuwaiti nationality being believed to have originated from Iraq.

In 1985, the then emir, Jaber Al-Ahmad Al-Sabah, escaped an assassination attempt. After the assassination attempt, the government changed the Bedoon's status from that of legal residents to illegal residents. By 1986, the Bedoon were fully excluded from the same social and economic rights as Kuwaiti citizens.

Since 1986, the Kuwaiti government has refused to grant any form of documentation to the Bedoon, including birth certificates, death certificates, identity cards, marriage certificates, and driving licences. The Bedoon also face many restrictions in employment, travel and education. They are not permitted to educate their children in state schools and universities.

In 1995, Human Rights Watch reported that there were 300,000 stateless Bedoon, and this number was formally repeated by the British government.

According to several human rights organizations, the State of Kuwait is committing ethnic cleansing and genocide against the stateless Bedoon. The Kuwaiti Bedoon crisis resembles the Rohingya crisis in Myanmar. In 1995, it was reported in the British parliament that the Al Sabah ruling family had deported 150,000 stateless Bedoon to refugee camps in the Kuwaiti desert near the Iraqi border with minimal water, insufficient food and no basic shelter, and that they were threatened with death if they returned to their homes in Kuwait City. As a result, many of the stateless Bedoon fled to Iraq, where they remain stateless people even today. The Kuwaiti government also stands accused of attempting to falsify their nationalities in official state documents. There have been reports of forced disappearances and mass graves of Bedoon.

The 1995 Human Rights Watch report stated:

"The totality of the treatment of the Bedoons amounts to a policy of denationalization of native residents, relegating them to an apartheid-like existence in their own country. The Kuwaiti government policy of harassment and intimidation of the Bedoons and of denying them the right to lawful residence, employment, travel and movement, contravene basic principles of human rights. Denial of citizenship to the Bedoons clearly violates international law. Denying Bedoons the right to petition the courts to challenge governmental decisions regarding their claims to citizenship and lawful residence in the country violates the universal right to due process of law and equality before the law."

British MP George Galloway stated:

"Of all the human rights atrocities committed by the ruling family in Kuwait, the worst and the greatest is that against the people known as the Bedoons. There are more than 300,000 Bedoons—one third of Kuwait's native population. Half of them—150,000—have been driven into refugee camps in the desert across the Iraqi border by the regime and left there to bake and to rot. The other 150,000 are treated not as second-class or even fifth-class citizens, but not as any sort of citizen. They are bereft of all rights. It is a scandal that almost no one in the world cares a thing about the plight of 300,000 people, 150,000 of them cast out of the land in which they have lived [when] many have lived in the Kuwaiti area for many centuries."

By 2004, the Bedoon accounted for only 40% of the Kuwaiti Army, a major reduction from their presence in the 1970s and 1980s. In 2013, the UK government estimated that there were 110,729 "documented" Bedoon in Kuwait, without giving a total estimate, but noting that all stateless individuals in Kuwait remain at risk of persecution and human rights breaches. The Bedoon are generally categorized into three groups: stateless tribespeople, stateless police/military and the stateless children of Kuwaiti women who married Bedoon men. According to the Kuwaiti government, there are only 93,000 "documented" Bedoon in Kuwait. In 2018, the Kuwaiti government claimed that it would naturalize up to 4,000 stateless Bedoon per year but this is considered unlikely. In 2019, the Iranian embassy in Kuwait announced that it offers Iranian citizenship to stateless Bedoon of Iranian ancestry.

In recent years, the rate of suicide among Bedoon has risen sharply.

=== Demographic engineering ===
The State of Kuwait formally has an official Nationality Law that grants non-nationals a legal pathway to obtaining citizenship. However, as access to citizenship in Kuwait is autocratically controlled by the Al Sabah ruling family it is not subject to any external regulatory supervision. The implementation of the Nationality Law is arbitrary and lacks transparency. The lack of transparency prevents non-nationals from receiving a fair opportunity to obtain citizenship. Consequently, the Al Sabah ruling family have been able to manipulate naturalization for politically motivated reasons. In the three decades after independence in 1961, the Al Sabah ruling family naturalized hundreds of thousands of foreign Bedouin immigrants predominantly from Saudi Arabia. By 1980, as many as 200,000 immigrants were naturalized in Kuwait. Throughout the 1980s, the Al Sabah's politically motivated naturalization policy continued. The naturalizations were not regulated nor sanctioned by Kuwaiti law. The exact number of naturalizations is unknown but it is estimated that up to 400,000 immigrants were unlawfully naturalized in Kuwait. The foreign Bedouin immigrants were mainly naturalized to alter the demographic makeup of the citizen population in a way that made the power of the Al Sabah ruling family more secure. As a result of the politically motivated naturalizations, the number of naturalized citizens exceeds the number of Bedoon in Kuwait. The Al Sabah ruling family actively encouraged foreign Bedouin immigrants to migrate to Kuwait. The Al Sabah ruling family favored naturalizing Bedouin immigrants because they were considered loyal to the ruling family, unlike the politically active Palestinian, Lebanese, and Syrian expats in Kuwait. The naturalized citizens were predominantly Sunni Saudi immigrants from southern tribes. Accordingly, none of the stateless Bedoon in Kuwait belong to the Ajman tribe.

The Kuwaiti judicial system's lack of authority to rule on citizenship further complicates the Bedoon crisis, leaving Bedoon no access to the judiciary to present evidence and plead their case for citizenship. Although non-nationals constitute 70% of Kuwait's total population the Al Sabah ruling family persistently denies citizenship to most non-nationals, including those who fully satisfy the requirements for naturalization as stipulated in the state's official Nationality Law. There is no official national census disclosing sectarian affiliation in Kuwait. However, it is estimated that 60-80% of Kuwait's Bedoon are Shia Muslims and, as a result, it is widely believed that the Bedoon issue in Kuwait is sectarian in nature. The Kuwaiti authorities permit the forgery of hundreds of thousands of politically motivated naturalizations whilst simultaneously denying citizenship to the Bedoon. The politically motivated naturalizations were noted by the United Nations, political activists, scholars, researchers and even members of the Al Sabah family. It is widely considered a form of deliberate demographic engineering. It has been likened to Bahrain's politically motivated naturalization policy. Within the GCC countries, politically-motivated naturalization policies are referred to as "political naturalization" (التجنيس السياسي).

=== Asylum seekers in Europe ===
A large number of stateless Bedoon from Kuwait regularly immigrate to Europe as asylum seekers. The United Kingdom is the most popular destination for Bedoom asylum seekers. According to the Home Office, Kuwait is the eighth largest source of asylum seekers crossing the English Channel on small boats.

== Shia Muslims ==
In recent years, several Shia Muslims have reported cases of torture, forced disappearance, unfair trial, arbitrary detention, extrajudicial punishment, and other human rights abuses. The International Rehabilitation Council for Torture Victims and United Nations criticized the Kuwaiti authorities' treatment of the so-called "Abdali Cell". In November 2021, Kuwait arbitrarily detained eight elderly Shia Muslim men without any charges.

== Foreign nationals ==
Human rights organizations frequently criticize Kuwait for the human rights abuses toward foreign nationals. Foreign nationals account for 70% of Kuwait's total population. The kafala system leaves foreign nationals prone to exploitation. Administrative deportation is very common in Kuwait for minor offenses, including minor traffic violations. Kuwait is one of the world's worst offenders in human trafficking. Hundreds of thousands of foreign nationals are subjected to numerous human rights abuses including inhumane conditions of involuntary servitude by employers in Kuwait. They are subjected to physical and sexual abuse, non-payment of wages, poor work conditions, threats, confinement to the home, and withholding of passports to restrict their freedom of movement.

Repeated abusers include M A Al-Kharafi & Sons and its subsidiary Kharafi National that have been cited by human rights organizations and the United States Department of State Country Report on Human Rights Practices for Kuwait. Many human rights organizations have accused Kuwait of apartheid policies toward foreign nationals. Kuwait is considered one of the most xenophobic countries in the world.

=== Diplomatic crisis ===
In 2018, there was a diplomatic crisis between Kuwait and the Philippines due to the mistreatment of Filipino workers in Kuwait. There are roughly 241,000 Filipinos in Kuwait. Most are migrant workers, and approximately 60% of Filipinos in Kuwait are employed as domestic workers. In July 2018, Kuwaiti fashionista Sondos Alqattan released a controversial video criticising domestic workers from the Philippines. Many of her clients were quick to denounce her.

In 2020, there was a diplomatic crisis between Kuwait and Egypt due to the mistreatment of Egyptian workers in Kuwait. In November 2021, Egyptian foreign worker Samih Maurice Bowles filed official complaints against Kuwait in front of the United Nations Working Group on Arbitrary Detention and the United Nations Special Rapporteur on Torture and Other Cruel, Inhuman or Degrading Treatment or Punishment for torture, forced disappearance, arbitrary detention, and other human rights abuses.

== Gulf War ==
In 1990, Iraq invaded Kuwait; the Iraqi military forces committed many human rights violations against Kuwaiti citizens, stateless people, and foreign nationals in Kuwait. Some were taken back to Iraq and released later.

== Women's rights ==
Human rights organizations persistently criticize the unequal status of women in Kuwait. The United Nations Working Group warned against the persistent barriers, both in law and in practice, on the path of women's quest for full equality. UN human rights experts Alda Facio and Kamala Chandrakirana said despite significant achievements, "discrimination against women persists in law and in practice, particularly in the context of the family and nationality laws, based on the presumption of women's dependence on men, which is contrary to the principle of equality." Muslim women in Kuwait are discriminated against under the family law. Children born to a Kuwaiti mother and non-Kuwaiti father do not get Kuwaiti citizenship, unless a decree is passed by the Minister of Interior.

Kuwait's position in international rankings has varied over the years. In 2014, Kuwait was ranked 113 of 142 globally in the Global Gender Gap Report, the country improved its ranking due to significant increases in the overall income indicator. In 2015, Kuwait was ranked 117 of 145 globally in the Global Gender Index. In 2020, Kuwait was ranked 122 of 153 globally in the Global Gender Gap Report. Regarding the GGGR subindex, Kuwait ranked 142 of 152 on political empowerment 143 of 153 on health and survival, 120 of 153 on economic opportunity, and 57 of 153 on educational attainment. In 2021, Kuwait was ranked 143 of 156 globally in the Global Gender Gap Report. Regarding the GGGR subindex, Kuwait ranked 153 of 156 on political empowerment, 94 of 156 on health and survival, 137 of 156 on economic opportunity, and 59 of 156 on educational attainment. In 2013, 53% of Kuwaiti women participated in the labor force. Kuwaiti women outnumber men in the workforce.

== Children ==
Camel racing is a popular sport in Kuwait. In the past, children employed as jockeys were severely mistreated.

== LGBT rights ==
LGBT people living in Kuwait face discriminatory laws and public attitudes. The penal code contains some general provisions against debauchery and immorality that can be used to punish LGBT people.

- Article 193 of the Penal Code punishes "consensual intercourse between men of full age (from the age of 21)" with a term of imprisonment of up to seven years.
- Article 198 prohibits public immorality. In 2008, the law was expanded to also outlaw "imitating the appearance of a member of the opposite sex" with fines and or imprisonment.

Foreign nationals infected with AIDS/HIV are deported.

== Freedom of expression ==
All forms of news and entertainment media are subject to high levels of government censorship.

Content that criticizes the ruling family (especially the Emir) is strictly prohibited.

According to a 2009 report from the Reporters without Borders, Kuwait is engaged in highly pervasive Internet filtering and selective filtering in security areas. The primary target of Internet filtering is pornography. The Kuwait Ministry of Communication regulates ISPs, making them block pornography websites.

Voice over Internet Protocol is legal in Kuwait.

== See also ==
- Politics of Kuwait
