= List of speakers of Kuwait National Assembly =

Speaker of the National Assembly
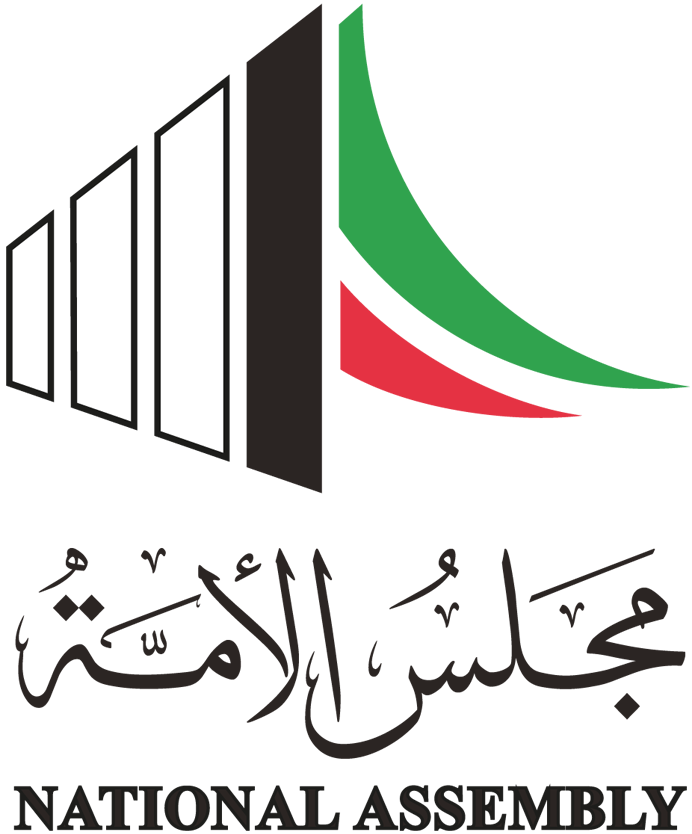
- Logo of the National Assembly

- Flag of Kuwait
- Incumbent; Vacant since 15 February 2024
- Kuwaiti National Assembly; Speaker's Office
- Nominator: Majority of the 65 voting members of the National Assembly
- Appointer: The National Assembly
- Term length: None
- Formation: 1962
- First holder: Abdullatif Al-Ghanim

Speaker of the National Assembly of Kuwait is the presiding officer of the National Assembly of Kuwait.

There is no speaker of the National Assembly as parliament has been dissolved in 15 February (Elections held on 4 April 2024) and 10 May 2024 After the emir Shiekh Mishal Al Ahmed Al Jaber Al Sabah.

Announced on state TV that the parliament will be dissolved and several articles of the constitution will be suspended for the next 4 years.

Legislative session	Election date	Name	Took office	Left office	Notes	Emir	Prime Minister
Constitutional Convention	30 Dec 1961	Abdullatif Thunayyan Al-Ghanim	1962	1963	Chairman of the constituent assembly	Abdullah Al-Salim Al-Sabah	Abdullah Al-Salim Al-Sabah
1	23 Jan 1963	Abdulaziz Al-Hamad Al-Saqr	1963	1965	Resigned	Abdullah Al-Salim Al-Sabah	Sabah Al-Salim Al-Sabah
1	-	Saud Al-Abdulrazzaq	1965	1967		Sabah Al-Salim Al-Sabah	Jaber Al-Ahmad Al-Sabah
2	25 Jan 1967	Ahmed Zaid Al-Serhan	1967	1970		Sabah Al-Salim Al-Sabah	Jaber Al-Ahmad Al-Sabah
3	23 Jan 1971	Khalid Al-Ghunaim	1971	1975		Sabah Al-Salim Al-Sabah	Jaber Al-Ahmad Al-Sabah
4	27 Jan 1975	Khalid Al-Ghunaim	1975	1976		Sabah Al-Salim Al-Sabah	Jaber Al-Ahmad Al-Sabah
The National Assembly was dissolved from 1976–1981.						Sabah Al-Salim Al-Sabah	Jaber Al-Ahmad Al-Sabah
5	23 Feb 1981	Mohammad Yousef Al-Adasani	1981	1985		Jaber Al-Ahmad Al-Sabah	Saad Al-Salim Al-Sabah
6	21 Feb 1985	Ahmed Al-Sadoun	9 Mar 1985	3 July 1986		Jaber Al-Ahmad Al-Sabah	Saad Al-Salim Al-Sabah
The National Assembly was dissolved from 1986–1992. (Note: On July 3, 1986, the Emir suspended the Constitution and dissolved the National Assembly indefinitely. During Iraq's occupation of Kuwait and under intense international pressure, the Emir pledged to revive the National Assembly after Kuwait was liberated. As a result, Kuwait held a legislative election on October 5, 1992.)						Jaber Al-Ahmad Al-Sabah	Saad Al-Salim Al-Sabah
7	20 Oct 1992	Ahmed Al-Sadoun	Oct 1992	1996		Jaber Al-Ahmad Al-Sabah	Saad Al-Salim Al-Sabah
8	23 Oct 1996	Ahmed Al-Sadoun	1996	4 May 1999		Jaber Al-Ahmad Al-Sabah	Saad Al-Salim Al-Sabah
9	4 July 1999	Jassem Al-Kharafi	17 July 1999			Jaber Al-Ahmad Al-Sabah; Sabah Al-Ahmad Al-Sabah	Saad Al-Salim Al-Sabah; Nasser Al-Mohammed Al-Sabah
10	5 July 2003	Jassem Al-Kharafi				Sabah Al-Ahmad Al-Sabah	Nasser Al-Mohammed Al-Sabah
11	29 June 2006	Jassem Al-Kharafi		19 Mar 2008		Sabah Al-Ahmad Al-Sabah	Nasser Al-Mohammed Al-Sabah
12	17 May 2008	Jassem Al-Kharafi				Sabah Al-Ahmad Al-Sabah	Nasser Al-Mohammed Al-Sabah
13	16 May 2009	Jassem Al-Kharafi		6 Dec 2012		Sabah Al-Ahmad Al-Sabah	Nasser Al-Mohammed Al-Sabah; Jaber Al-Mubarak Al-Sabah
14 (Note: On June 20, 2012, the Constitutional Court annulled the February 2012 legislative election and reinstated the National Assembly elected in 2009, of which al-Kharafi was Speaker.)	2 Feb 2012	Ahmed Al-Sadoun	Feb 2012	June 2012	Annulled by constitutional court	Sabah Al-Ahmad Al-Sabah	Jaber Al-Mubarak Al-Sabah
14 (Note: In June 2013, the Constitutional Court annulled December 2012 legislative election and ordered the holding of fresh elections.)	1 Dec 2012	Ali Al-Rashid	Dec 2012	June 2013	Annulled by constitutional court	Sabah Al-Ahmad Al-Sabah	Jaber Al-Mubarak Al-Sabah
14	27 July 2013	Marzouq Al-Ghanim	Aug 2013	Oct 2016		Sabah Al-Ahmad Al-Sabah	Jaber Al-Mubarak Al-Sabah
15	26 Nov 2016	Marzouq Al-Ghanim	11 Dec 2016			Sabah Al-Ahmad Al-Sabah	Jaber Al-Mubarak Al-Sabah
16	5 Dec 2020	Marzouq Al-Ghanim	15 Dec 2020	2 Aug 2022		Nawaf Al-Ahmad Al-Sabah	Sabah Al-Khalid Al-Sabah; Mohammed Al-Sabah; Ahmad Al-Nawaf Al-Sabah
17 (Note: In March 2023, the Constitutional Court annulled 2022 legislative election and ordered the holding of fresh elections.)	29 Sep 2022	Ahmed Al-Sadoun	18 Oct 2022	19 Mar 2023	Annulled by Constitutional Court	Nawaf Al-Ahmad Al-Sabah	Ahmad Al-Nawaf Al-Sabah
17	6 June 2023	Ahmed Al-Sadoun	20 June 2023	15 Feb 2024		Nawaf Al-Ahmad Al-Sabah; Mishal Al-Ahmad Al-Sabah	Ahmad Al-Nawaf Al-Sabah Mohammed Al Sabah
