= Abdullatif Al-Ghanim =

Kuwaiti politician (1912–1988)

- عبد اللطيف الغانم
- Al-Ghanim (right) giving Emir Abdullah Al-Salim Al-Sabah the Constitution of Kuwait

Chairman of the Kuwait Constituent Assembly
- In office 1962–1963
- Preceded by: Office established
- Succeeded by: Abdulaziz Al-Hamad Al-Saqr

Personal details
- Born: 1912 Kuwait City
- Died: 14 March 1988 (aged 75–76)
- Profession: Politician

Abdullatif Muhammad Thunayyan Al-Ghanim (Arabic: عبد اللطيف محمد ثنيان الغانم; 1912 – 14 March 1988) was a Kuwaiti politician. He served as the first Chairman of the Kuwait Constituent Assembly from 1962 to 1963 and led the drafting of the Constitution of Kuwait.

== Biography ==
Al-Ghanim was born in 1912 in the Qibla district of Kuwait City. He was from a wealthy merchant family. He attended Al-Mubarakiya School and then Al-Ahmadiya School before traveling to India with his father in 1922. There, his father ran a business in Karachi and Al-Ghanim learned English. As he grew older, he began assisting his father's business. Working for the business led to him traveling between Kuwait, India, and Iraq. The newspaper Annahar noted that this "gave him the opportunity to interact with Kuwaiti, Arab, and foreign figures who contributed to shaping his exceptional personality, which played a prominent role in laying the foundations of democracy in Kuwait".

Al-Ghanim was elected to the first Legislative Council as a result of the June 1938 Kuwaiti general election. The following year, he was elected to the second Legislative Council. In 1952, he won election to the Municipal Council of Kuwait and became director of his municipality. He resigned in 1962 and ran for election to the Constituent National Assembly in the Kaifun constituency. The Constituent Assembly was assigned with creating the Constitution of Kuwait. Al-Ghanim was unanimously named chairman of the assembly. He was one of five members of the Constitutional Drafting Committee, along with Hamoud Al-Zaid Al-Khaled, Yaqoub Al-Humaidhi, Saad Al-Abdullah Al-Salem, and Saud Al-Abdulrazzaq, and chaired the committee, which came up with the current Constitution of Kuwait.

Following the 1963 Kuwaiti general election, in which Al-Ghanim was not elected, he was nominated by Emir Abdullah Al-Salim Al-Sabah to become the Minister of Public Health in January 1963. After the end of that cabinet, Al-Ghanim was appointed Minister of Public Works in January 1964. He later resigned to focus on his private business. In 1985, Al-Ghanim wrote an article in the newspaper Al Qabas titled, "Our democracy, which has been emptied of its content", describing his work in drafting the constitution and how later government policies "emptied it of its potential". He died on 14 March 1988. After his death, he was described in Al Qabas as "one of Kuwait's most loyal men, who contributed to laying the foundations of the country's political history. A man of principle who never compromised on the rights of his country and people. He fulfilled his mission with honesty and integrity [and his efforts] will remain a shining record of patriotism and unwavering principles."
