= 1938 Kuwaiti general election =

The 1938 Kuwaiti general election may refer to:

- June 1938 Kuwaiti general election, a general election held on 29 June
- December 1938 Kuwaiti general election, a general election held on 24 December
