= 1958 Kuwaiti general election =

General elections were held in Kuwait on 28 March 1958. Voters elected 55 members of a new advisory council. However, due to a dispute with the government, the new council was never convened.

== Background ==
Following two elections in 1938 and a dispute between Sheikh Ahmad Al-Jaber Al-Sabah and the elected Legislative Council, the sheikh dissolved the council in March 1939 and replaced it with a fully-appointed advisory council. However, the council ceased meeting in July 1940 after an investigation into the treasury's accounts.

In 1954 a petition was circulated calling for an elected council. Four years later Sheikh Abdullah Al-Salim Al-Sabah, who had been involved in the creation of the original Legislative Council, held elections for a new advisory council.

== Results ==
Several of those elected had been elected to the previous Legislative Council in 1938, including Abdul Latif Mohammed Thunayan Al-Ghanim, Mishaan Khudair Mishaan Khudair, Nisf Youssef Al-Nisf, Youssef Abdul Wahab Al-Adsani and Youssef Saleh Al-Humaidhi.

Candidate	Votes	%	Notes
Youssef Al-Fulaij	397		Elected
Abdulaziz Al-Hamad Al-Saqr	370		Elected
Hamad Abdul Mohsen Al-Mishari	367		Elected
Badr Al-Salem	360		Elected
Muhammad Abdul Mohsen Al-Nasser Al-Kharafi	354		Elected
Hammoud Al-Zaid Al-Khaled	352		Elected
Suleiman Al-Bassam	328		Elected
Mishaan Khudair Mishaan Khudair	326		Elected
Jassim Abdulaziz Abdulwahab Al-Qatami	325		Elected
Ahmed Saud Al-Khaled	314		Elected
Yousef Ibrahim Al-Ghanim	311		Elected
Hamad Al-Humaidhi	302		Elected
Khaled Suleiman Al-Adsani	294		Elected
Marzouk Bodi	279		Elected
Abdul Wahab Al-Othman	272		Elected
Khalifa Khaled Al-Ghunaim	271		Elected
Abdul Hamid Abdul Aziz Al-Sanea	271		Elected
Fahad Al-Marzouq	263		Elected
Yacoub Al-Hamed	261		Elected
Muhammad Youssef Al-Nisf	258		Elected
Ahmed Mohammed Al-Khatib	251		Elected
Muhammad Al-Bahr	246		Elected
Fahad Al-Sultan	244		Elected
Ahmed Al-Fahd	240		Elected
Abdul Latif Mohammed Thunayan Al-Ghanim	239		Elected
Dakheel Jassar	238		Elected
Abdul Latif Al-Shaya	237		Elected
Youssef Saleh Al-Humaidhi	235		Elected
Nisf Youssef Al-Nisf	234		Elected
Badr Sheikh Youssef	230		Elected
Sabeeh Al-Barrak Al-Sabeeh	226		Elected
Abdul Latif Al-Nisf	218		Elected
Marzouq Al-Abdulwahab	214		Elected
Ali Abdul Rahman Al-Bahr	210		Elected
Salem Al-Qattan	208		Elected
Yousef Ibrahim Al-Ghanim	208		Elected
Abdul Razzaq Khaled Al-Zaid Al-Khaled	204		Elected
Khaled Al-Kharafi	201		Elected
Barak Abdul Mohsen Al-Ajeel	199		Elected
Fahd Al-Rasheed	188		Elected
Suleiman Jalifa Al-Shaheen	185		Elected
Youssef Abdul Wahab Al-Adsani	182		Elected
Abdullah Abdul Latif Al-Othman	181		Elected
Mahmoud Issa Al-Asfour	174		Elected
Muhammad Mulla Hussein	171		Elected
Abdulaziz Al-Rashed	170		Elected
Abdul Razzaq Hamad Al-Khaled	167		Elected
Ali Al-Jassar	167		Elected
Abdullah Al-Dakhil	167		Elected
Abdulaziz Al-Fawzan	165		Elected
Abdullah Al-Shaya	164		Elected
Hamoud Al-Mudhaf	159		Elected
Ahmed Al-Fawzan	159		Elected
Abdullah Mishari Abdullah Al-Roudhan	152		Elected
Marzouq Khaled Youssef Al-Ghunaim	151		Elected
Total			
Source: Al Qabas

== Aftermath ==
Following the elections, the government demanded that three of the elected members resign from their posts. As a result, the newly elected council never met. The sheikh appointed members to a new Supreme Council the following year and in 1961 elections to a constitutional convention were held.
