= Women's suffrage in Kuwait =

The first bill which would have given women the right to vote in Kuwait was put to the parliament in 1963. It was ultimately overturned due to pressure from the Al Sabah ruling family. Bills continued to be denied through 1985 and 1986. Kuwait then became heavily involved in the Iraq-Iran war, and women began demanding recognition for their efforts in keeping their families and society functional. The parliament agreed and the first woman was finally appointed as the ambassador of the Persian Gulf in 1993. In 1996, 500 women stopped working for an hour to show solidarity in their right for suffrage, and demonstrations continued throughout the next 6 years. In May 1999 a decree that allowed women the right to vote and run for office was issued by the emir; however, it was overruled again by the parliament 6 months later.

In the 2003 election, women created mock ballots that “allowed hundreds of women to cast symbolic votes for real candidates.” In March 2005, 1,000 people surrounded the Kuwaiti parliament and on May 17, a bill was passed with 37 votes for and 21 votes against, granting Kuwaiti women the right to vote and run for an elected office. Four years later, in May 2009, four female candidates won parliamentary seats in a general election out of fifty available seats. Although this was 8% of parliament, by the 2013 election, no women had been elected to the current parliament, and the last woman elected resigned in May 2014. Safa Al Hashem became the first and only woman elected to two consecutive terms of the Kuwaiti parliament in 2012 and 2016, but lost her seat in the 2020 elections.

== History ==
After Kuwait gained independence in 1961, the Kuwaiti parliament passed new laws that limited voting to those who were male, over the age of 21, and had family living in Kuwait since before 1920. Women from the first graduating class at various universities across Kuwait banded together to create the Women’s Cultural and Social Society in 1963. Their goals were to raise awareness of women’s issues, but more importantly, to boost Kuwaiti women up and give them the opportunities to succeed. Kuwaiti women did have many more freedoms in comparison to their close neighboring countries, such as access to a higher education.

=== Women's suffrage in 1985 and 2005 ===
The franchise was expanded to include women in 2005. When voting was first introduced in Kuwait in 1985, Kuwaiti women had the right to vote. This right was later removed. In 2005, Kuwaiti women were re-granted the right to vote.

== Women's Suffrage Movement ==
In 1973, parliament looked over a bill which would have given women the right to vote and run for elected office, which was ultimately overturned due to pressure from orthodox all over. Over 10 years later in 1984, the movement seemed to have gained some support when the current emir (Jaber Sabah) and the prime minister (Crown Prince Saad Sabah) announced that they were in favor of a women’s suffrage bill, which in turn offered some false hope. Different bills continued to be denied through 1985 and 1986 respectively, and until this changed, the highest position in government a Kuwaiti woman could hold was that of assistant secretary. Throughout the late 1980s and 1990s, Kuwait then became heavily involved in the Iraq-Iran war. With the involvement in the war, it became vital for women to become hospital volunteers and even push the boundaries to smuggle in food and necessary items for their families. Since women took the initiative, they also demanded acknowledgment and recognition for their efforts. The parliament agreed and the first woman was finally appointed as the ambassador of the Persian Gulf in 1993. In May 1999, the current emir issued a decree that allowed women the right to vote and run for office; however, under the Kuwaiti Constitution, Parliament was allowed to reject and overrule the emir, and it did. However, for a period of 6 months, women had the right to vote. Unfortunately, there were no elections heard during this time before the emir was overruled.

The movement began to gain speed after this, and the first non-violent demonstration kicked off in 1996 when 500 women stopped working for an hour to show solidarity in their right for suffrage. Small demonstrations continued throughout the next 6 years and in 2002 a few Kuwaiti women decided to protest outside voter registration centers. Things continued to escalate and in the 2003 election, women created mock ballots that “allowed hundreds of women to cast symbolic votes for real candidates.” In March 2005, 1,000 people surrounded the Kuwaiti parliament to reinforce their need for suffrage. On May 17, 2005 a bill was passed 37 votes for and 21 votes against women’s suffrage, granting Kuwaiti women the right to vote and run for an elected office.

Four years later, in May 2009, four female candidates won parliamentary seats in a general election out of fifty available seats. Although this was 8% of parliament, by the 2013 election, no women had been elected in to the current parliament and the last woman elected resigned in May 2014.

=== Activists ===
Noureya Al-Saddani: An author, historian, broadcaster, and director, Al-Saddani started the first women’s organization in Kuwait. In 1971 she proposed the National Assembly grant women's political rights.

Lulwa Almulla: worked around the globe and in her home country of Kuwait as well for the past 26 years, attempting to gain suffrage for women in her home. Although she helps run the family business, her true passion was in volunteering. She claims that women's suffrage does not end there and now women must be empowered to hold places in parliament.

"The Criminal Court today sentenced Rana al-Sadoun to three years with hard labour in the case of her repeating a speech by Musallam al-Barrak."

=== Kuwait and the ICCPR ===
Kuwait first ratified the Convention on the Elimination of All Forms of Discrimination against Women in 1994 and 2 years later ratified the ICCPR, or the International Covenant on Civil and Political Rights, in 1996. In the year 2000, the Kuwaiti government has done little to modify its legislation that discriminates on the basis of gender.

==== Objections under the ICCPR ====
"Although the Government of Kuwait endorses the worthy principles embodied in these two articles as consistent with the provisions of the Kuwait Constitution in general and of its article 29 in particular, the rights to which the articles refer must be exercised within the limits set by Kuwaiti law."

=== Nationality ===
In the area of nationality, Kuwaiti women do not have the right to give their children Kuwaiti citizenship if they marry non-Kuwaiti men. Kuwaiti women cannot receive residential care and other rights that men can have if they marry non-Kuwaiti women. If a person is born in or outside Kuwait and their father is a Kuwaiti national, they are automatically a national themselves.

== See also ==
- Timeline of women's suffrage
