= Khalid Al-Ghunaim =

Kuwaiti politician

- خالد صالح غنيم الغنيم

Speaker of the Kuwait National Assembly
- In office 1971–1975
- Preceded by: Ahmed Zaid Al-Serhan

Speaker of the Kuwait National Assembly
- In office 1975–1976
- Succeeded by: Mohammad Yousef Al-Adasani

Personal details
- Born: 1911
- Died: December 30, 1990 (aged 78–79)
- Citizenship: Kuwait

Khalid Saleh Ghunaim Al-Ghunaim (Arabic: خالد صالح غنيم الغنيم; 1911 - 30 December 1990), was a former speaker of the Kuwaiti National Assembly, and the first speaker to preside over two consecutive terms of the National Assembly. He is the father of former minister Abdul Rahman Khalid Al-Ghunaim.
