= 1996 Kuwaiti general election =

General elections were held in Kuwait on 23 October 1996. A total of 230 candidates contested the election, which saw pro-government candidates win the largest number of seats. Voter turnout was 83%.

The elections restricted suffrage to males.

== Results ==
Party	Votes	%	Seats	+/–
Pro-government candidates			19	+1
Sunni candidates			16	+9
Independents			6	–14
Shi'ite candidates			5	+2
Secular opposition			4	+2
Total			50	0
Total votes	89,387	–		
Registered voters/turnout	107,169	83.41		
Source: Nohlen et al.

== Aftermath ==
Following the elections Ahmed Al-Sadoun was elected Speaker, defeating Jassem Al-Kharafi.

Candidate	Party	Votes	%
Ahmed Al-Sadoun	Independent	30	50.85
Jassem Al-Kharafi	Independent	29	49.15
Total		59	100.00
Valid votes		59	98.33
Invalid/blank votes		1	1.67
Total votes		60	100.00
Registered voters/turnout		61	98.36
