= Massouma al-Mubarak =

Kuwaiti politician and academic (born 1947)

- Born: 1947 (age 78–79); Kuwait
- Education: University of North Texas (M.A.); Josef Korbel School (PhD)
- Occupation: Academic

Massouma al-Mubarak (born 1947) is Kuwait's first female government minister, sworn in on 20 June 2005. She was educated in the United States and is a professor of political science.

== Biography ==
Massouma went to the US for higher education in 1971. In 1976 she completed an MA from the University of North Texas. She later earned a doctorate from the University of Denver. Since 1982 she has been teaching political science at the Kuwait University.

She has been active in the field of equal rights for women and also writes a daily column for Al Anba newspaper. In 2002 she collected signatures on a petition opposing segregation by gender or abolishing coeducation in Kuwait.

In June 2005, she was appointed minister of planning and minister of state for administrative development to the cabinet led by prime minister Sabah Al Ahmed Al Sabah. On 25 August 2007, she resigned as minister of health following a fire in a hospital in Jahra which killed two patients. Parliamentarians had held the government responsible for the fire and demanded a minister should be appointed from the health sector.

In the 2009 Kuwaiti parliamentary elections, she and three other women won seats to become the first women to enter the Kuwaiti parliament.
