= Kuwaiti nationality law =

Kuwaiti Citizenship Act

Cabinet of Kuwait
- Long title: An Act relating to a Kuwaiti citizenship
- Enacted by: Government of Kuwait
- Status: Current legislation

The Kuwaiti nationality law is the legal pathway for non-nationals to become citizens of the State of Kuwait. The Kuwaiti nationality law is based on a wide range of decrees; first passed in 1920 and then in 1959 and 1960. A number of amendments have been made over the years. Since the 1960s, the implementation of the nationality law has been very arbitrary and lacks transparency. The lack of transparency prevents non-nationals from obtaining citizenship.

== History of naturalization in Kuwait ==
A 1959 Nationality Law created two tiers of citizenship, those resident before 1920 and those resident after. Only those resident before 1920 were eligible to participate in politics. It also created a class of non-citizens known as the Bidoon (Arabic for "without"). Law No. 35 of 1962 established that naturalised citizens could vote after 20 years after becoming citizens, but still could not hold office themselves. Children of naturalised citizens were also considered naturalised. Such laws were considered important to the creation of the National Assembly in 1963, as this new body would provide formal confirmation of the Emir.

The State of Kuwait has an official Nationality Law which grants non-nationals a legal pathway to obtain citizenship. However, access to citizenship in Kuwait is autocratically controlled by the Al Sabah ruling family, it is not subject to any external regulatory supervision. The implementation of the Nationality Law is arbitrary and lacks transparency. The lack of transparency prevents non-nationals from receiving a fair opportunity to obtain citizenship. Consequently, the Al Sabah ruling family have been able to manipulate naturalization for politically-motivated reasons. In the three decades after independence in 1961, the Al Sabah ruling family naturalized hundreds of thousands of foreign Bedouin immigrants predominantly from Saudi Arabia. By the year 1980, as many as 200,000 immigrants were naturalized in Kuwait. Throughout the 1980s, the Al Sabah's politically-motivated naturalization policy continued. The naturalizations were not regulated nor sanctioned by Kuwaiti law. The exact number of naturalizations is unknown but it is estimated that up to 400,000 immigrants were unlawfully naturalized in Kuwait. The foreign Bedouin immigrants were mainly naturalized to alter the demographic makeup of the citizen population in a way that makes the power of the Al Sabah ruling family more secure. As a result of the politically-motivated naturalizations, the number of naturalized citizens exceeds the number of Bedoon in Kuwait. The Al Sabah ruling family actively encouraged foreign Bedouin immigrants to migrate to Kuwait, the Al Sabah ruling family favored naturalizing Bedouin immigrants because they were considered loyal to the ruling family unlike the politically active Palestinian, Lebanese and Syrian expats in Kuwait. The naturalized citizens were predominantly Sunni Saudi immigrants from southern tribes. Accordingly, there are no stateless Bedoon in Kuwait belonging to the Ajman tribe.

Kuwait has the largest number of stateless people in the entire region. Most stateless Bedoon belong to northern tribes (especially Al-Muntafiq). The northern tribes are predominantly Shia Muslims. A minority of stateless Bedoon in Kuwait belong to Kuwait's 'Ajam community. The Kuwaiti judicial system's lack of authority to rule on citizenship further complicates the Bedoon crisis, leaving Bedoon no access to the judiciary to present evidence and plead their case for citizenship. Although non-nationals constitute 70% of Kuwait's total population, the Al Sabah ruling family persistently denies citizenship to most non-nationals including those who fully satisfy the requirements for naturalization as stipulated in the state's official Nationality Law. The Kuwaiti authorities permit the forgeries of hundreds of thousands of politically-motivated naturalizations, while simultaneously denying citizenship to the Bedoon. The politically-motivated naturalizations were noted by the United Nations, political activists, scholars, researchers, and even members of the Al Sabah family. It is widely considered a form of deliberate demographic engineering. It has been likened to Bahrain's politically-motivated naturalization policy. Within the GCC countries, politically-motivated naturalization policies are referred to as "political naturalization" (التجنيس السياسي).

The proportion of naturalized Bedouin voters rose from 21% in 1963 to 45% in 1975, while naturalized Bedouin representation in parliament rose from 14 of the 50 seats to 23. Backlash to these demographic engineering policies led in 1970 to a law allowing citizenship to be revoked due to forgery. In 1986 the period during which a naturalised citizen could not vote was extended to 30 years.

The direction of reform shifted again after the Iraqi invasion of Kuwait, with the ruling family viewing increased democratic legitimacy as likely to bring greater international support. National Assembly Resolution No. 44 of 1994 increased the ability of naturalised citizens to participate in politics by reclassifying the descendants of naturalised citizens as full citizens. In 2005 the right to participate in politics was extended to women. These actions created a significant shift in politics, creating a new source of parliamentary opposition. It also increased political calls for naturalisation of the Bidoon. Backlash to demographic engineering via political naturalisation grew, and following Mishal Al-Ahmad Al-Jaber Al-Sabah becoming Emir in 2023, became a driving political force.

=== Legal discrimination ===
Kuwait has more than 300 non-Muslim citizens, mostly Christians and Bahais. In 1982, the parliament amended the constitution to bar non-Muslims from naturalization. There have been multiple proposals made to amend the nationality law to allow non-Muslims to become citizens, but in 2019 the government made clear that its policy was to keep "the current text."

The late Nabil Al Fadl submitted an inquiry to the Constitutional Court questioning the constitutionality of barring non-Muslims from obtaining the Kuwaiti nationality. The most recent proposal was made by Saleh Ashour who suggested the repeal of item 5 of article 4 of the nationality law.

== Citizenship revocation ==
Citizenship revocation is a contentious human rights issue in Kuwait. According to Carnegie Endowment, Kuwait has weaponized citizenship revocation as a tool for political control. The government has the authority to revoke Kuwaiti citizenship without a criminal conviction and Kuwait's courts are not allowed to handle appeals. The lack of judicial oversight means that citizenship revocation occurs without a court ruling.

Since March 2024, Kuwait has been revoking the citizenship of many citizens (by decree). On 15 March a hotline was created for people to report on those they thought were "forgers" or "dual nationals". Revocations began increasing in number in October 2024. In early December 2024, the Emir issued a decree to revoke the Kuwaiti citizenship of several high-profile individuals: Nawal Al-Kuwaitia, Noha Nabil, and Dawood Hussein including his children who were automatically granted Kuwaiti citizenship through paternal affiliation. A law change in December 2024 allowed for citizenship revocation following DNA tests.

By March 2025, Kuwait revoked the citizenship of 42,000 people in just six months. Revocation announcements were made weekly. Revocations paused in February 2026, following the start of the 2026 Iran war, but resumed after a ceasefire was declared in April with 2,000 revocations. By 15 April 2026, the official number was 71,059, a number which did not include wives and descendants of those individuals who would also lose citizenship through these actions. Estimates of people affected reach as high as 20% of all citizens. Groups that have been heavily impacted include women who married Kuwaiti men and obtained Kuwaiti citizenship, those awarded citizenship due to "exceptional service to the nation", and children of Kuwaiti women and non-Kuwaiti fathers.

The lack of transparency and recourse in the citizenship revocation policy is a violation of international law. The majority of revoked citizenships were legally granted to the wives of Kuwaiti men under Article 8 of the nationality law. Their citizenships are being retroactively revoked after Article 8 was recently repealed by decree, violating international law which prohibits the retroactive application of nationality law. Many individuals with revoked citizenship are taken to the "Central Agency for Illegal Residents," which handles stateless individuals in Kuwait, further deepening the country's stateless population.

Kuwait’s citizenship revocation policy contradicts international treaties such as the Universal Declaration of Human Rights, which states that "everyone has the right to a nationality" and "no one shall be arbitrarily deprived of his nationality." Human rights organizations have raised concerns over the potential for statelessness, lack of due process in citizenship revocations, and the discriminatory impact on vulnerable groups, including women, elderly people, and children. For example, the citizenship revocation policy impacts many children, further deepening the number of stateless children in the country.

Neveen Ma'arafi (Arabic: نيفين معرفي, lit. 'Neveen Ma'arafi') defended the citizenship revocation policy, claiming that it is being carried out to tackle corruption. Many activists disputed her claims.

== Travel freedom ==
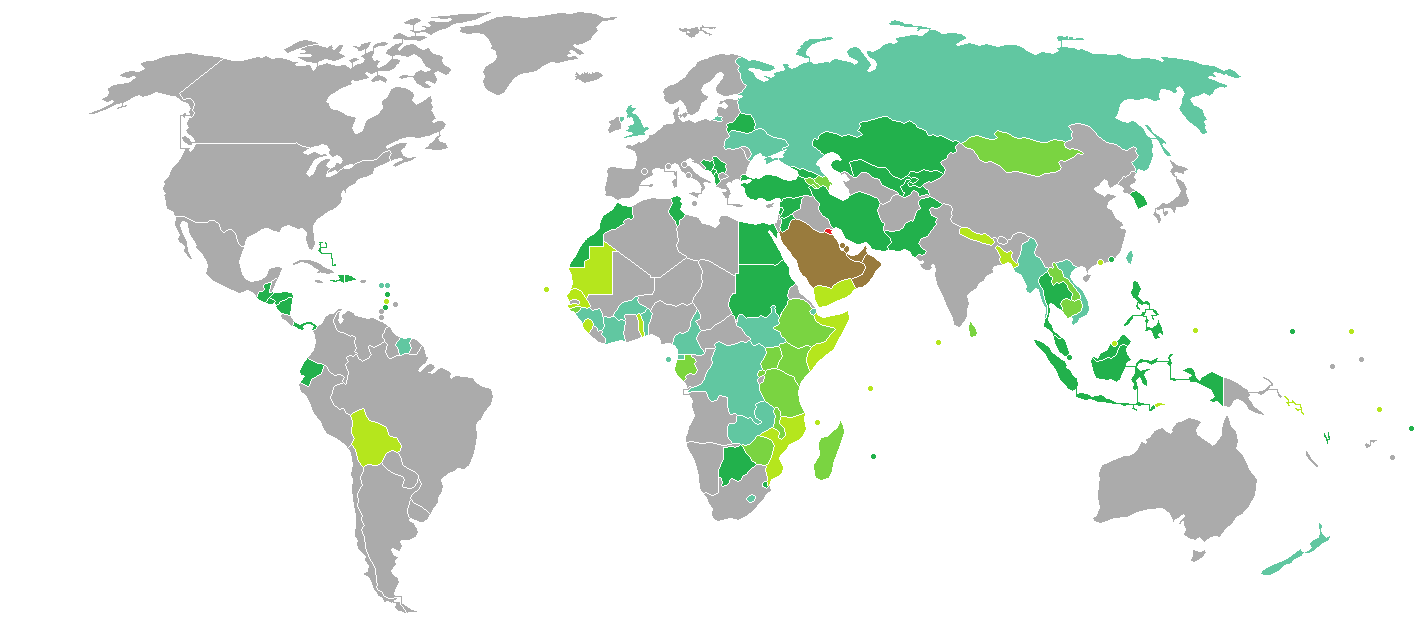
Visa requirements for Kuwaiti citizens

In 2016, Kuwaiti citizens had visa-free or visa on arrival access to 82 countries and territories, ranking the Kuwaiti passport 57th in the world according to the Visa Restrictions Index.

== Nationality Law ==
=== Original Kuwaitis ===
An original Kuwaiti is a person who settled in Kuwait before 1920. An original Kuwaiti is deemed to have maintained their normal residence in Kuwait even if they reside in a foreign country if they have the intention of returning to Kuwait.

=== By descent ===
A child born to a Kuwaiti father irrespective of the place of birth is a Kuwaiti citizen.

=== By birth ===
Orphan children born to unknown parents in Kuwait are considered to be Kuwaiti citizens by birth.

Theoretically, a child born to a Kuwaiti mother and an unknown father (irrespective of place) can be considered a Kuwaiti citizen. However, Kuwaiti women who have sex out-of-marriage and get pregnant can face jail terms in Kuwait.

=== Loss of Kuwaiti citizenship ===
They may lose their citizenship if they:

- Committed a fraud and declared citizenship without satisfying the necessary legal criteria. In this case the citizenship of any dependent person may also be revoked.
- are convicted of a crime related to honor or honesty within 15 years of grant of naturalization.
- are dismissed from public office on disciplinary grounds related to honesty or honor within 10 years of grant of naturalization.
- are or were working for a foreign state and plan on seriously to undermine the economic or social structure. The authorities must need proof that they are doing so to revoke their citizenship.

=== Denial of Kuwaiti citizenship ===
A person may be denied citizenship if they satisfy the following:

- has begun work in a foreign state in their military
- has worked for a foreign state which has been in war or has suspended diplomatic relations.
- Is a resident in a country abroad and join an association which is plans to seriously undermine the economic or social structure or has been convicted of an offense that involves such a situation.

Any person may be restored or revoked of their citizenship if they have satisfied the above.

=== Restrictions and points to remember while obtaining citizenship ===
- The Head of the Police Department will give a certificate stating that the person is Kuwaiti.
- Proof may be asked while obtaining citizenship
- After the certificate is given an investigation will be carried out. If the investigation finds that the certificate was obtained on the basis of fraud, it will be taken back.
- No Kuwaiti passport will be given for 2 years.
- If a person has given incorrect statements orally or written, the person may be imprisoned for up to 3 years and/or be fined up to 200 KD. If the person has furnished statements which are false, the person may be imprisoned for not more than seven years and/or be fined 500 KD.
- Any passport which has been given to a person in the 2 years as told above will be invalid on the expiration of that two-year period.

=== Dual nationality ===
Kuwait does not recognize dual nationality.
