= June 1938 Kuwaiti general election =

Unofficial elections were held in Kuwait on 29 June 1938. Fourteen members of a new council were elected from among 20 candidates, with Sheikh Ahmad Al-Jaber Al-Sabah subsequently granting recognition to the body as the Legislative Council.

== Background ==
The Majlis movement began in early 1938 when a group of businessmen began calling for political reforms, including better public services and greater public participation in government. In late February an activist was publicly flogged after being accused of graffiti and anti-government propaganda. Despite reassurances that the accomplices he had named were not under threat of any action, several people fled to Iraq. An underground movement subsequently developed and published its proposals for reform in the Iraqi Az-Zaman newspaper on 3 April. After the proposals received support from other Iraqi newspapers, the sheikh wrote a letter to the Iraqi press telling them to cease interfering in Kuwaiti affairs.

Due to the unrest, the British Political Agent Gerald de Gaury was authorised to suggest to the sheikh that a council be created. Although the proposal was initially rejected, agitation from businessmen increased after they found out about the British advice. The sheikh also faced pressure from within his family, with his cousin Crown Prince Abdullah Al-Salim Al-Sabah reportedly providing de Gaury with a copy of an agreement between the sheikh and prominent families in which he had promised to form a council if he was elected sheikh.

== Results ==
On 29 June, three leading businessmen formally requested the sheikh create an elected council. On the same day, heads of 150 prominent families met to elect the members of the council, with 14 elected from among 20 candidates.

Candidate	Votes	%	Notes
Mohammed Shaheen Al-Ghanem	103		Elected
Youssef bin Issa Al-Qenaei	100		Elected
Abdullah Al-Hamad Al-Saqr	100		Elected
Mishaan Khudair Mishaan Khudair	82		Elected
Suleiman Khaled Al-Adsani	77		Elected
Ali Al-Sayyid Suleiman Al-Rifai	76		Elected
Mishari Al-Hassan Al-Badr	62		Elected
Sultan Ibrahim Al-Kulaib	62		Elected
Abdul Latif Mohammed Thunayan Al-Ghanim	61		Elected
Youssef Saleh Al-Humaidhi	59		Elected
Saleh Othman Al-Rashed	50		Elected
Youssef Marzouq Al-Marzouq	45		Elected
Hamad Dawood Al-Marzouq	39		Elected
Khaled Abdul Latif Al-Hamad	37		Elected
Total			
Source: Al Qabas

== Aftermath ==
The elected members met at the Mejlis on 4 July and demanded the sheikh recognise the new council. After initially trying to undermine it by attempting unsuccessfully to offer privileges to members who would defect, he consented on 6 July and recognised it as the Legislative Council. Crown Prince Abdullah was elected speaker.

However, the British felt that the powers given by the sheikh to the council were too broad, particularly making it responsible for approving foreign treaties and giving the speaker executive authority. A meeting was arranged with de Gaury, the sheikh, the Political Resident of the Persian Gulf and some members of the council on 15 October, at which it was agreed that the sheikh would have sole responsibility for negotiating and signing foreign agreements, but that they needed approval by the council to become law.

Tensions between the council and the sheikh and political agent soon came to a head, with the sheikh unhappy with the council dismissing his chief secretary Abdullah Saleh Al Mulla (who had effectively been the country's government for four decades) and the British unhappy with the council attempting to take control of revenue from oil. The sheikh dissolved the council on 21 December and called fresh elections.
