= Salwa al-Jassar =

Kuwaiti politician (born 1957)

Salwa al-Jassar (Arabic: سلوى الجسار; born 20 October 1957) is a Kuwaiti politician. She was one of four women elected to the National Assembly in the 2009 general election. Al-Jassar heads the Center for Empowering Women and ran as an independent. Al-Jassar obtained a bachelor's degree in geography and economics from Kuwait University in 1980, a master's degree from the University of Michigan in 1987 and a PhD from the University of Pittsburgh. She worked as a professor at Kuwait University. She had previously authored a report on women in Kuwaiti politics with the United Nations Development Programme.
