= Lulwah Al-Qatami =

Kuwaiti educator and Nobel Peace Prize nominee

Lulwa Al-Qatami
- لولوة القطامي
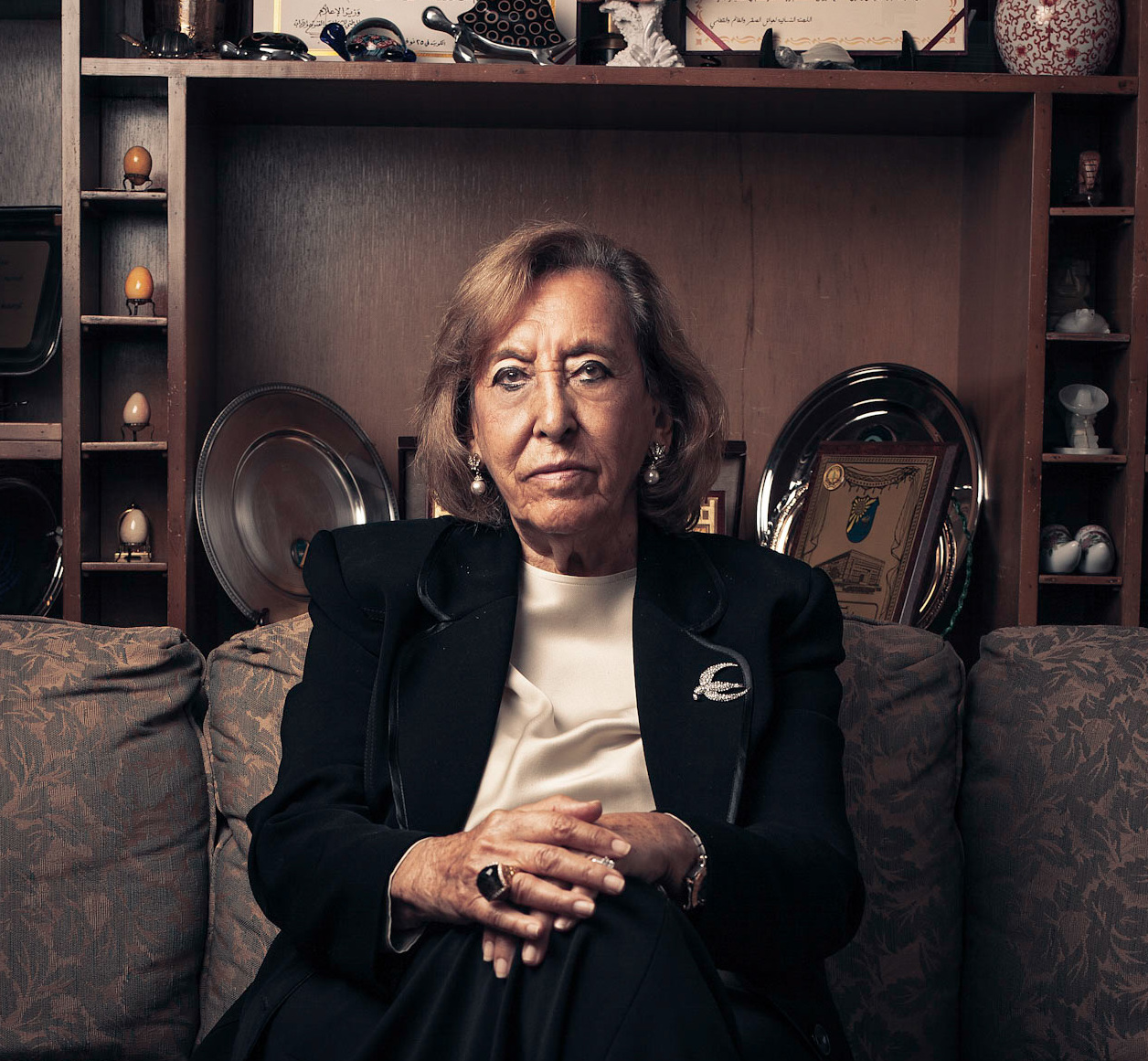
- Born: 1933 or 1934 (age 91–92)
- Education: University of Edinburgh
- Employer(s): Mirqab School for Girls; Kuwait University
- Organization(s): Kuwait Women's Cultural & Social Society
- Awards: Nobel Peace Prize (nomination)
- Honours: Legion of Honour

Lulwa Al-Qatami, in Arabic: لولوة القطامي (born 1933/34) is an activist and educator, who was the first woman from Kuwait to attend university abroad. A former director of Kuwait University and UNESCO ambassador, she was nominated for the Nobel Peace Prize in 2005 and in 2019 was awarded the Legion of Honour for her services to education and women's empowerment. She is a founder and former president of the Kuwait Women's Cultural & Social Society.

== Biography ==
In 1938, at the age of four years old, Al-Qatami joined kindergarten. She continued her primary education in Iraq, after her family left Kuwait. In 1952 she travelled to England to study at a French convent school, where she learnt French and English. After two years she moved to an English school to study for O-Levels and A-Levels, at the suggestion of her father who believed an English education would be more useful to her when she returned to Kuwait. She studied English and French at the University of Edinburgh. Whilst there, she was Vice President of the Student's Union. She was the first woman from Kuwait to attend university overseas.

In the early 1960s she led a tour for women students from Kuwait to Jerusalem. Her teaching career started teaching English and French at the Mirqab School for Girls, where she was the first female teacher to not wear an abaya at work. At the time it was compulsory for all women teachers to wear a black abaya, Al-Qatami led protests against the rule, which included the public burning of abayas. The protest was a public scandal in Kuwait, but resulted in the rule being lifted, enabling women to wear their other clothing. She subsequently described the abaya as "a tool of colonialism". During the visit of the Algerian revolutionary Djamila Bouhired to the school, Al-Qatami encouraged students to donate their jewellery for the cause.

In 1963 Al-Qatami was a founding member of the Kuwait Women's Cultural & Social Society. The first President was Dalal Al-Mashaan, but later Al-Qatami took over the role. From 1963 to 1992 she was a member of its General Assembly. Part of her work with the society was to ensure that there were enough classes and resources for young women who could not afford to attend private schools. In addition to the Society's educational work, they also funded relief work with refugees from Lebanon and the Sudan. Al-Qatami organised fundraising to build a refugee camp in Sudan for people fleeing from the Eritrean-Ethiopian War - it included a school for 1,000 children and a bakery which provided 50,000 baguettes each day.

In 1975 Al-Qatami was appointed as the first Director of the College of Women at Kuwait University by the Minister for Education. She resigned from her position in 1993 in protest against the increasing prevalence of women wearing the niqab there. However, during her time at the university she introduced a women's-only prayer room for students. In 1990 she was appointed as an UNESCO ambassador for literacy. She has spoken about the negative impact of British colonialism on Kuwait, especially in relation to education - in particular for women.

== Awards and recognition ==
=== Nobel Peace Prize ===
In 2005 Al-Qatami was nominated for the Nobel Peace Prize in recognition for her humanitarian work, in particular for women's social and educational rights, in Kuwait.

=== State Appreciation Award ===
In 2009 she was awarded Kuwait's State Appreciation Award, with a prize of 10,000 dinars.

=== Legion of Honour ===
In 2019, Al-Qatami was awarded the Légion d'honneur by the French government for her work in promoting the achievements of women in Kuwait.
