= 2009 Kuwaiti general election =

Early general elections were held in Kuwait on 16 May 2009, the country's third within three years. Kuwait had voted on six occasions between 1991 and 2009. The turnout rate was 50%. The election was notable in that four women were elected for the first time since Kuwait gained independence from the United Kingdom in 1961.

== Background ==
The Constitutional Court dissolved the National Assembly of Kuwait on 18 March 2009 over accusations of supposed abuse of democracy and threats to political stability. The government had resigned just two days before to evade questioning in parliament. Suggested solutions to this recurring problem (government resignation) include the formation of a government without any members of the royal family (a so-called "popular government"), thus making the possibility of parliamentary questioning a reality, or appointing the crown prince as PM, which would make parliamentary questioning sufficiently unlikely so that it would not be a problem any more.

== Candidates ==
210 candidates contested the election for the 50 National Assembly seats. 16 were female.

== Results ==
The results were announced on 17 May 2009. Liberals won at least 8 seats while Independent candidates won 20 seats. The four women who won the elections were the first women ever to be elected to Kuwait's parliament. Aseel al-Awadhi and Rola Dashti were victors in the third district. Also winning were Massouma al-Mubarak and Salwa al-Jassar. When voting was first introduced in Kuwait in 1985, Kuwaiti women had the right to vote. This right was later removed. Women in Kuwait were later re-granted the right to vote and stand in parliamentary and local elections in May 2005.

Sunni Islamists won 10 fewer seats than they had held in the 2008 elections.

Party	Votes	%	Seats
Tribal candidates			20
Sunni candidates			11
Shiite candidates			9
Liberals			8
Others			2
Total			50
Registered voters/turnout	384,790	–	
Source: IFES
