= December 1938 Kuwaiti general election =

General elections were held in Kuwait on 24 December 1938.

== Background ==
Unofficial elections had taken place in June 1938, electing 14 members of a council that Sheikh Ahmad Al-Jaber Al-Sabah subsequently recognised as the Legislative Council in July. However, tensions between the council and the sheikh and British political agent soon came to a head, with the sheikh unhappy about the council dismissing his chief secretary and the British unhappy with the council attempting to take control of revenue from oil. The sheikh dissolved the council on 21 December and called fresh elections.

The council was expanded from 14 to 20 members, with the number of eligible voters was extended from 150 to 400.

== Results ==
Thirteen of the fourteen members elected in June were re-elected, with only Youssef Marzouq Al-Marzouq not returning to the new council.

Candidate	Votes	%	Notes
Youssef bin Issa Al-Qenaei	333		Re-elected
Hamad Dawood Al-Marzouq	333		Re-elected
Khaled Abdul Latif Al-Hamad	270		Re-elected
Mishaan Khudair Mishaan Khudair	265		Re-elected
Mohammed Shaheen Al-Ghanem	258		Re-elected
Sultan Ibrahim Al-Kulaib	254		Re-elected
Abdullah Al-Hamad Al-Saqr	252		Re-elected
Mishari Al-Hassan Al-Badr	250		Re-elected
Abdul Latif Mohammed Thunayan Al-Ghanim	248		Re-elected
Ali Al-Sayyid Suleiman Al-Rifai	246		Re-elected
Ahmed Al-Khamis	237		Elected
Youssef Saleh Al-Humaidhi	233		Re-elected
Ali Al-Banwan	209		Elected
Suleiman Khaled Al-Adsani	205		Re-elected
Saleh Othman Al-Rashed	204		Re-elected
Ali Abdul Wahab Al-Mutawa	202		Elected
Mishari Hilal Al-Mutairi	198		Elected
Mohammed Ahmed Al-Ghanem	185		Elected
Nisaf Yusuf Al-Nisaf	172		Elected
Youssef Abdul Wahab Al-Adsani	169		Elected
Total			
Source: Al Qabas

== Aftermath ==
Before its first sitting the sheikh presented council members with a new constitution that turned the council from an executive body to an advisory one, and allowed him to veto council decisions. However, the council refused to approve it. As a result, the sheikh dissolved the council on 7 March 1939 with the intention of replacing it with a fully appointed one.

On 9 March Muhammad bin Munais made a public speech attacking the sheikh and handed out anti-government leaflets. His arrest the following day led to an altercation when former council member Youssef Al-Marzouq attempted to intervene. During the incident, Muhammad Al-Qitami, a supporter of the council, fired at the police, while Al-Marzouq took out his handgun. The police returned fire, wounding both Al-Marzouq and Al-Qitami, with Al-Qitami later dying of his wounds. Munais was subsequently executed for treason. On 11 March five former members of the council were arrested, with a new jail having to be built to house the unprecedented number of prisoners.

On 12 March the sheikh appointed 14 members to a new advisory council, which functioned until July 1940 but then ceased meeting.
