= Demographic engineering =

Deliberate efforts to shift the ethnic balance of an area

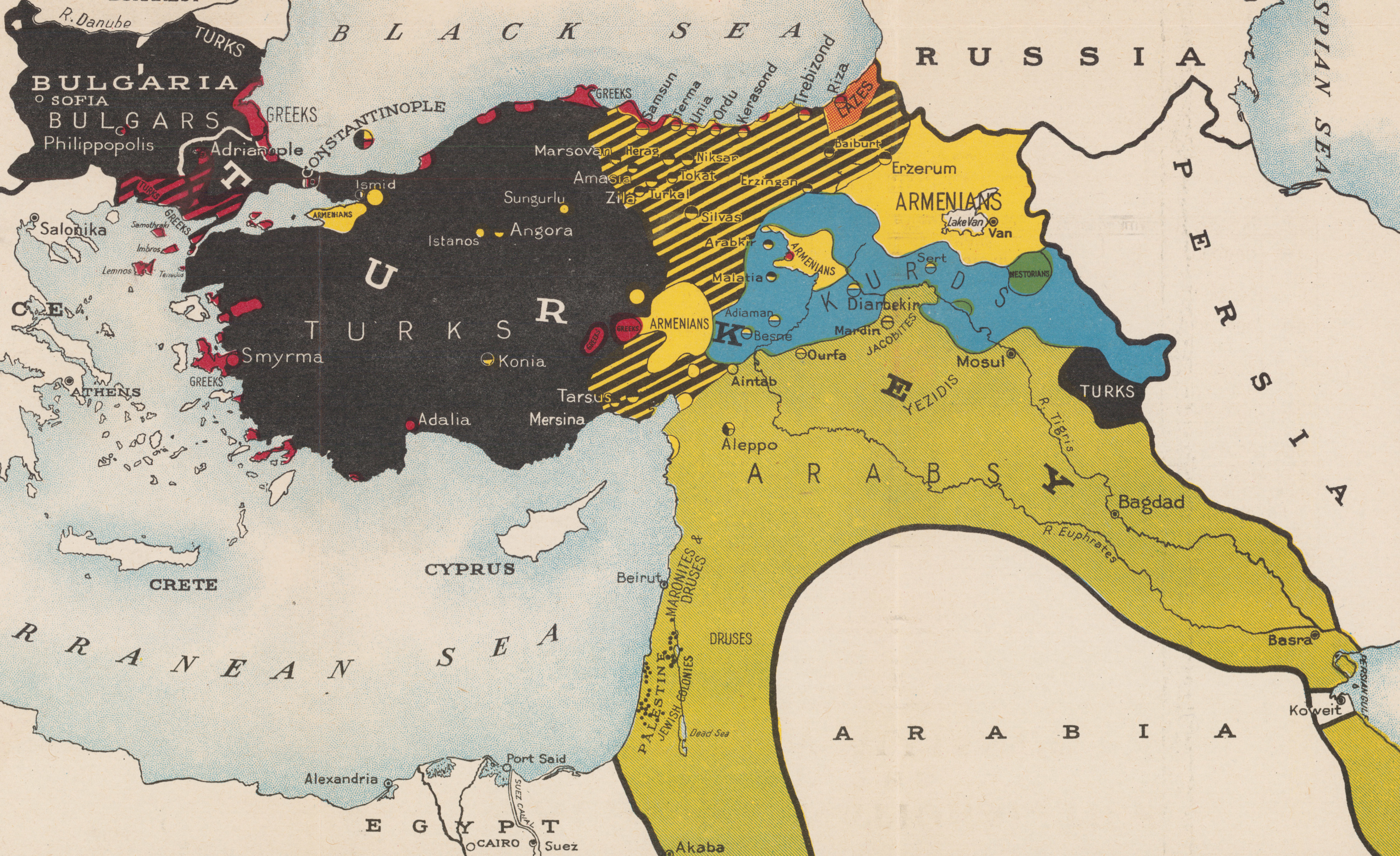
Results of demographic engineering through genocide in the Ottoman Empire: elimination of Greeks, Assyrians (listed here as "Nestorian"), and Armenians from Anatolia and Eastern Thrace

Demographic engineering is the deliberate effort to shift the ethnic balance of an area, especially when undertaken to create ethnically homogeneous populations. Demographic engineering ranges from falsification of census results, redrawing borders, differential natalism to change birth rates of certain population groups, targeting disfavored groups with voluntary or coerced emigration, and population transfer and resettlement with members of the favored group. At an extreme, demographic engineering is undertaken through genocide. It is a common feature of conflicts around the world.

== Definition ==
The term "demographic engineering" is related to population transfers (forced migrations), ethnic cleansing, and in extreme cases genocide. It denotes a state policy (such as population transfer) to deliberately effect population compositions or distributions.

John McGarry states that during a territorial dispute—and especially before negotiations—the disputants often try "to create 'demographic facts' on the ground which undercut the claims of competitors, strengthens one’s own claims, and present fait accomplis at negotiations". He cites many examples of demographic engineering, including the former Yugoslavia, Cyprus dispute, Germans in Poland, Arab-Israeli conflict and Ossetians in Georgia. Although he restricts demographic engineering to state policies, McGarry also notes the existence of "a grey area where state representatives use surrogates to inflict violence on minorities" or fail to prevent mobs, as occurred with the anti-Jewish pogrom Kristallnacht and anti-German violence in interwar Poland.

== Goals ==
The aim of demographic engineering does not have to be ethnic homogeneity. Before the rise of nation states demographic engineering was used to secure the newly conquered territories of empires, or to increase population levels in sparsely populated areas, often having strategic importance for imperial trade routes and increasing the political and economic power of a privileged ethnic group. Demographic engineering in the era of nation states, that is, after the decline of empires, has been used in support of the rise of nationalism (usually ethnic nationalism, but also religious nationalism).

== Examples ==
=== Ottoman Empire and Turkey ===
There were three phases of demographic engineering as a state policy of the Ottoman Empire. Between the 16th and 18th centuries the policy of population transfer was commonly practiced to achieve demographic engineering of the populations of newly conquered regions (a type of demographic engineering sometimes called "ethnic restructuring"). The second phase between the 1850s and 1913 saw thousands of Muslims displaced in the aftermath of significant Ottoman military defeats in the Balkans. This was also the start of demographic engineering policies in Anatolia that eventually escalated to genocide in the Armenian genocide.

According to Dutch Turkologist Erik-Jan Zürcher, the era from 1850 to 1950 was "Europe’s age of demographic engineering", citing the large number of forced population movements and genocides that occurred. He states that for much of this period, the Ottoman Empire was "the laboratory of demographic engineering in Europe". Swiss historian Hans-Lukas Kieser states that the Ottoman Committee of Union and Progress "was far ahead of German elites" when it came to ethnic nationalism and demographic engineering. Kerem Öktem connects demographic engineering to the state-led efforts to change toponyms derived from the language of the undesired population group during or after state efforts to effect its reduction or elimination (see geographical name changes in Turkey). Dilek Güven states that the 1955 Istanbul pogrom was demographic engineering because it was provoked by the state in order to cause ethnic minority citizens (Armenians, Greeks, Jews) to leave. McGarry states that tens of millions of Europeans were uprooted by demographic engineering projects in the twentieth century.

=== Eastern Europe after WWII ===
In the wake of the Second World War, most ethnic Germans fled or were expelled from the countries of Eastern Europe.

=== Kuwait ===
In recent decades, numerous policies of the Kuwaiti government have been characterized as demographic engineering, especially in relation to Kuwait's stateless Bedoon crisis and the history of naturalization in Kuwait.

The State of Kuwait formally has an official Nationality Law that grants non-nationals a legal pathway to obtaining citizenship. However, as access to citizenship in Kuwait is autocratically controlled by the Al Sabah ruling family it is not subject to any external regulatory supervision. The naturalization provisions within the Nationality Law are arbitrarily implemented and lack transparency. The lack of transparency prevents non-nationals from receiving a fair opportunity to obtain citizenship. Consequently, the Al Sabah ruling family have been able to manipulate naturalization for politically motivated reasons. In the three decades after independence in 1961, the Al Sabah ruling family naturalized hundreds of thousands of foreign Bedouin immigrants predominantly from Saudi Arabia. By 1980, as many as 200,000 immigrants were naturalized in Kuwait. Throughout the 1980s, the Al Sabahs' politically motivated naturalization policy continued. The naturalizations were not regulated nor sanctioned by Kuwaiti law. The exact number of naturalizations is unknown but it is estimated that up to 400,000 immigrants were unlawfully naturalized in Kuwait. The foreign Bedouin immigrants were mainly naturalized to alter the demographic makeup of the citizen population in a way that made the power of the Al Sabah ruling family more secure. As a result of the politically motivated naturalizations, the number of naturalized citizens exceeds the number of Bedoon in Kuwait. The Al Sabah ruling family actively encouraged foreign Bedouin immigrants to migrate to Kuwait. The Al Sabah ruling family favored naturalizing Bedouin immigrants because they were considered loyal to the ruling family, unlike the politically active Palestinian, Lebanese, and Syrian expats in Kuwait. The naturalized citizens were predominantly Sunni Saudi immigrants from southern tribes. Accordingly, none of the stateless Bedoon in Kuwait belong to the Ajman tribe.

The Kuwaiti judicial system's lack of authority to rule on citizenship further complicates the Bedoon crisis, leaving Bedoon no access to the judiciary to present evidence and plead their case for citizenship. Although non-nationals constitute 70% of Kuwait's total population the Al Sabah ruling family persistently denies citizenship to most non-nationals, including those who fully satisfy the requirements for naturalization as stipulated in the state's official Nationality Law. The Kuwaiti authorities permit the forgery of hundreds of thousands of politically motivated naturalizations whilst simultaneously denying citizenship to the Bedoon. The politically motivated naturalizations were noted by the United Nations, political activists, scholars, researchers and even members of the Al Sabah family. It is widely considered a form of deliberate demographic engineering and has been likened to Bahrain's politically motivated naturalization policy. Within the GCC countries, politically-motivated naturalization policies are referred to as "political naturalization" (التجنيس السياسي).

=== Israel ===
Numerous policies of the Israeli government have been characterized by scholars and human rights organizations as demographic engineering. A Human Rights Watch report charging Israel with committing the crime of apartheid cites its policies that fragment the Palestinian population in the occupied territories as facilitating "the demographic engineering that is key to preserving political control by Jewish Israelis"

Israel's efforts to ensure a Jewish majority has influenced its policies towards the Israeli-occupied territories over time. David Ben-Gurion had initially been in favor of withdrawal due to the much higher birth rates of the Palestinian population in the newly occupied territories and "to insure survival a Jewish state must at all times maintain within her own borders an unassailable Jewish majority". Yigal Allon was in favor of holding the Jordan Valley, which was sparsely populated, while allowing autonomy for the rest of the more heavily populated West Bank so that "The result would be the Whole Land strategically and a Jewish state demographically". Large scale Russian Jewish immigration to Israel was hoped, by the Israeli right which favored retaining the territories, to be enough of a buffer to allow for both absorption of those territories and maintain a Jewish majority. The West Bank barrier follows a route to maximize the inclusion of Jewish settlers in the West Bank and minimize the Palestinian population, with Ariel Sharon telling Arnon Soffer "For the world it is a security fence but for you and me, Arnon, it is a demography fence."

Israel's efforts to establish a Jewish majority that would ensure control over the Palestinian population extended to Israel proper. Following an attack by Jewish forces on Lod that saw the fleeing or expulsion of 20,000 Palestinians from the city, the Palestinian population attempted to return to their homes. The Israeli response was to both rebuff them with military attacks and to settle a massive number of Jewish immigrants in the now seized properties that had been abandoned. While 1,030 Arabs were allowed to remain in Lod, in the years immediately following the 1948 war over 10,000 Jewish immigrants were settled in the city. A new master plan for the city saw massive construction of housing and other infrastructure for Jewish residents, unlike the intensive demolition carried out in the Arab core of the city.

A 2017 report by Richard A. Falk, professor emeritus of international law at Princeton University, and Virginia Tilley, a political scientist from Southern Illinois University Carbondale, wrote that "The first general policy of Israel has been one of demographic engineering, in order to establish and maintain an overwhelming Jewish majority."

=== Syria ===
During the colonial period, the French used demographic engineering, among other measures, to contain the Arab nationalism. For example, the "loyal" refugees were resettled in strategically important areas.

The Syrian government's actions in Homs during the Syrian Civil War were described as demographic engineering seeking "to permanently manipulate the population along sectarian lines in order to consolidate the government’s power base."

== Forms ==
Forms of demographic engineering in recent decades include:

- Population measurement
- Pronatalist policies
- Assimilation
- Boundary changes
- Economic pressures (both direct and indirect)
- Population transfers (ethnic dilution, ethnic consolidation and ethnic cleansing)

== See also ==
- Cultural assimilation
- Deportation
- Ethnic cleansing
- Ethnic nationalism
- Genocide
- Immigration
- Racial segregation
- Settler colonialism
- Forced sterilisation
- Forced adoption
- Social cleansing
- Redlining
- Replacement migration
- Transmigration program
- Internal colonialism
- Illegal immigration to the United States
- White genocide conspiracy theory
- Great Replacement conspiracy theory
- Eurabia conspiracy theory

== Sources ==
- Bookman, Milica Zarkovic (2013) [1997]. The Demographic Struggle for Power: The Political Economy of Demographic Engineering in the Modern World. Routledge. ISBN 978-1-135-24829-1.
- Bookman, Milica Zarkovic (2002). "Demographic Engineering and The Struggle for Power". Journal of International Affairs. 56 (1): 25–51. JSTOR 24357882.
- Kieser, Hans-Lukas (2018). Talaat Pasha: Father of Modern Turkey, Architect of Genocide. Princeton University Press. ISBN 978-1-4008-8963-1.
  - Lay summary in: Kieser, Hans-Lukas. "Pasha, Talat". 1914-1918-online. International Encyclopedia of the First World War.
- McGarry, John (1998). "'Demographic engineering': the state-directed movement of ethnic groups as a technique of conflict regulation". Ethnic and Racial Studies. 21 (4): 613–638. doi:10.1080/014198798329793.
- Morland, Paul (2016). Demographic Engineering: Population Strategies in Ethnic Conflict. Routledge. ISBN 978-1-317-15292-7.
- Öktem, Kerem (2008). "The Nation's Imprint: Demographic Engineering and the Change of Toponymes in Republican Turkey". European Journal of Turkish Studies. Social Sciences on Contemporary Turkey (7). doi:10.4000/ejts.2243. ISSN 1773-0546.
- Schad, Thomas (2016). "From Muslims into Turks? Consensual demographic engineering between interwar Yugoslavia and Turkey". Journal of Genocide Research. 18 (4): 427–446. doi:10.1080/14623528.2016.1228634. S2CID 151533035.
- Tirtosudarmo, Riwanto (2019). "Demographic Engineering and Displacement". The Politics of Migration in Indonesia and Beyond. Springer. pp. 49–68. ISBN 978-981-10-9032-5.
- Tzfadia, Erez; Yacobi, Haim (2007). "Identity, Migration, and the City: Russian Immigrants in Contested Urban Space in Israel". Urban Geography. 28 (5). Tayloy & Francis: 436–455. doi:10.2747/0272-3638.28.5.436. ISSN 0272-3638. S2CID 145502001.
- Üngör, Uğur Ümit (2011). The Making of Modern Turkey: Nation and State in Eastern Anatolia, 1913–1950. Oxford University Press. ISBN 978-0-19-965522-9.
- Weiner, Myron; Teitelbaum, Michael S. (2001). Political Demography, Demographic Engineering. Berghahn Books. ISBN 978-1-57181-254-4.
- Zürcher, Erik-Jan (2009). "The Late Ottoman Empire as Laboratory of Demographic Engineering". Il Mestiere di Storico (1): 1000–1012. doi:10.1400/148038. Archived from the original on 2026-08-16.
