= Noha Nabil =

TV presenter and poet (born 1986)

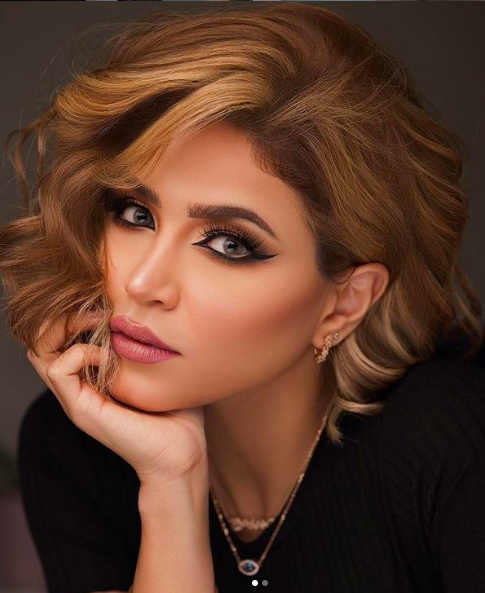
- Nabil in 2019
- Born: Noha Nabil S Mohammad; November 11, 1986 (age 39); State of Kuwait
- Education: Kuwait University (Chemical Engineering)
- Occupations: Media personality, socialite, model, businesswoman
- Years active: 1992 - Present
- Website: www.nohastyleicon.com

Noha Nabil S Mohammad (Arabic: نهى نبيل السيد محمد; born November 11, 1986) is a social media influencer. In 2017, she was listed by Forbes among the Top 10 Most Influential Arab Women in Social Media.

== Biography ==
Nabil was born in Kuwait. At the age of 6, she made her first media appearance as a presenter in the show Mama Anisa on Kuwait Television. In 2000, she was nominated for the award for "Best Presenter of a Children's Program" at the Cairo International Film Festival.

Nabil earned a degree from Kuwait University in chemical engineering in 2005. In 2008 she moved to the United States, and in 2009 she launched a personal fashion and styling blog "See Fashion in My Eyes." In 2017, she received a gold medal from Snapchat as the first Arab on the platform.

Nabil appeared at Salalah Khareef Festival to read her poetry in 2003, and in 2015 she published a diwan (collection of poetry) titled ملح الشعر (Salt of Poetry). In this, she included poems such as أمانه يا حمد (Amana Ya Hamad), السكسوكه (Saksokeh), and حلم الطفوله (Childhood dream).

Nabil works with luxury brands for advertising and endorsements, including Bourjois, Swarovski, Messika Jewelry, Givenchy, Fendi, Armani and Versace.

In 2016, she was named the "Most Influential Arab Figure" at a festival in Kuwait. In 2017, she was ranked fifth by Forbes in the list of "The Top 10 Most Influential Arab Women in Social Media" . In 2018, she was named the Most Influential Figure in the Arab World at a Ramadan festival. In 2020, Vogue Business described her as "by far the biggest influencer in the Arabic Middle East".

On April 30, 2025, the Kuwaiti citizenship was revoked of Noha Nabil by Emiri decree.
