= 1963 Kuwaiti general election =

General elections were held in Kuwait on 23 January 1963. A total of 205 candidates contested the 50 seats, with pro-government candidates emerging as the largest bloc. Voter turnout was 85.0%.

== Results ==
Party	Votes	%	Seats
Pro-government candidates			19
Independents			16
Secular opposition			8
Shi'ite candidates			6
Sunni candidates			1
Total			50
Total votes	14,355	–	
Registered voters/turnout	16,889	85.00	
Source: Nohlen et al.
