= Constitution of Kuwait =

Fundamental law of Kuwait

Kuwaiti Constitution

Overview
- Jurisdiction: Kuwait
- Ratified: 11 November 1962
- Date effective: 11 November 1962
- System: Unitary semi-constitutional monarchy

Government structure
- Branches: Three (Executive, Legislative and Judiciary)
- Head of state: Emir of Kuwait
- Chambers: National Assembly of Kuwait
- Executive: Prime Minister of Kuwait; Cabinet of Kuwait
- Federalism: No
- Author: Constitutional Assembly
- Signatories: Sheikh Abdullah Al-Salim Al-Sabah

The Constitution of Kuwait (Arabic: الدستور الكويتي, romanized: ad-distūr al-Kuwayti, Gulf Arabic pronunciation: [ɪddɪstuːr ɪlkweːti]) was framed by the Constitutional Assembly in 1961–1962 and signed into law on 11 November 1962 by the Emir, the Commander of the Military of Kuwait Sheikh Abdullah Al-Salim Al-Sabah.

== History ==
In June 1961, following the independence of Kuwait and under the shadow of an Iraqi threat, Sheikh Abdullah Al-Salim Al-Sabah announced that he would establish a constitution for Kuwait. In December, elections were held for a Constituent Assembly, which then drafted a constitution promulgated as Law Number 1 on November 11, 1962. Although articles of the constitution have since been suspended twice, the document nonetheless remains the basic statement of intent for the Kuwaiti political system.

== Timeline of the 1962 Kuwaiti constitution ==
- 19 June 1961: Independence
- 21 June 1961: Kuwait applies for membership in the Arab League
- 25 June 1961: Abd al-Karim Qasim claims Kuwait for Iraq
- 30 June 1961: Kuwait requests admission to the United Nations
- 1 July 1961: British troops land in Kuwait
- 4 July 1961: Arab League debates whether the admission of new states (such as Kuwait) requires unanimity of member states or a simple majority
- 7 July 1961: Soviet Union vetoes a British Security Council resolution to "respect" Kuwaiti independence
- 10–26 July 1961:
  - A delegation of prominent Kuwaitis visits Egypt; Gamal Abdel Nasser agrees to assemble an Arab force to replace British troops
  - The delegation also visits Saudi Arabia, Sudan, Libya, Tunisia, Morocco, Jordan, and Lebanon
- 20 July 1961: Kuwait admitted to the Arab League, the Iraqi delegation walks out of the meeting in protest
- 21 July 1961: The Arab League makes preparations to send Arab troops to Kuwait
- 26 August 1961: Kuwait emir Sheikh Abdullah Al-Salim Al-Sabah appoints a committee to draft a law on elections to the Constitutional Convention
- 6 September 1961: Law on elections issued
- 10 September 1961: Arab forces begin to arrive in Kuwait under the auspices of the Arab League; forces are from Saudi Arabia, the United Arab Republic, Jordan, Sudan, and Tunisia
- 10 October 1961: British forces complete withdrawal from Kuwait
- 30 November 1961: Kuwait applies again for United Nations membership, and the Soviet Union vetoes the application again
- 30 December 1961: Elections held to the Constitutional Convention
- 20 January 1962: Opening session of the Constitutional Convention
- 27 March 1962: Jasim Al-Qatami, a prominent Arab nationalist, appointed deputy minister of foreign affairs
- 11 November 1962: 1962 constitution issued
- 23 January 1963: Elections held to the first National Assembly
- 9 February 1963: Abd al-Karim Qasim overthrown and killed
- 14 May 1963: Kuwait admitted to the United Nations
- 4 October 1963: Iraqi government formally recognizes Kuwait
- 12 October 1963: Kuwait provides a loan of 30 million British pounds to the Iraqi government

== Overview and organization of government ==
The Constitution of the State of Kuwait is composed of 183 articles divided into five chapters:

- The State and the System of Government
- Fundamental Constituents of Kuwaiti Society
- Public Rights and Duties
- Powers
- General and Transitional Provisions

The constitution defines Kuwait as "a hereditary Emirate, the succession to which shall be in the descendants of the late Mubarak Al-Sabah." This clause codifies what has become practice: the semiformal alternation of power since 1915 between the lines of Mubarak's two ruling sons: Jabir and Salim.

The Constitution of Kuwait is theoretically based on the modern civil state democratic principles and combines aspects of both presidential and parliamentary systems (theoretically). The pillars of the Constitution are the sovereignty of the State, public freedom and equality before the law. Although granting the emir very substantial power, the constitution also provides for some semblance of political participation by the citizens. The system of government is defined in Article 6 as "democratic, under which sovereignty resides in the people, the source of all powers." Articles 79 to 122 establish the National Assembly and lay out the rules governing its formation, rights, and duties.

The head of the state is the Emir, the Commander of the Military of Kuwait, who has extensive competencies, who along with his cabinet constitutes the executive branch. The Emir is also part of the legislative branch along with the National Assembly of Kuwait. The parliament can be dismissed by the Emir, which is usually followed by elections within 2 months. The constitution opens with the declaration that Kuwait is "an independent sovereign Arab State," and its people are "a part of the Arab Nation." Islam is "the religion of the state," and the sharia (Islamic law) is "a main source of legislation." The latter phrase has been the source of much debate, with Islamist opposition members pressing to have Islam made "the" source of legislation.

== Individual and social rights and duties ==
Individual rights protected by the constitution are extensive and include personal liberty and equality before the law, freedom to hold beliefs and express opinions, and freedom of the press. The residences of citizens are inviolable, the torture and the deportation of Kuwaiti citizens are prohibited, and the accused are assumed innocent until proven guilty. Also guaranteed is the freedom to form associations and trade unions. The constitution guarantees the independence of the judiciary and designates the Supreme Council of the Judiciary as its highest body and guarantor of judicial independence.

The constitution also grants citizens a number of social rights, which form the basis for Kuwait's extensive welfare system. The state is constitutionally obligated to care for the young and to aid the old, the ill, and the disabled. It is obliged to provide public education and to attend to public health. The constitution provides for state involvement in the national economy to the degree that these obligations necessitate.

However, Articles 16 through 19 protect private property, stating that "private property is inviolable" and reminding citizens that "inheritance is a right governed by the Islamic Sharia." Article 20 stipulates that "the national economy shall be based on social justice. It is founded on fair cooperation between public and private activities. Its aim shall be economic development, increase of productivity, improvement of the standard of living and achievement of prosperity for citizens, all within the limits of the law." Duties of citizens include national defense, observance of public order and respect for public morals, and payment of taxes.

These rights and obligations, however, apply only to Kuwaiti citizens. The remainder of the population have few political and civil rights and enjoy restricted access to the benefits of the state welfare system.

== Unconstitutional Suspensions in 1976, 1986, and 2024 ==
Article 181 of the Kuwaiti Constitution stipulates that no part of the Constitution may be suspended except during Martial Law and within the parameters defined by law. It also explicitly states that the National Assembly must continue to meet during such periods and that the immunity of its members cannot be violated. Contrary to these stipulations, Kuwaiti emirs have unlawfully suspended the parliament and several constitutional provisions indefinitely on three occasions—in 1976, 1986, and most recently in May 2024.

On 29 August 1976, the Emir Sabah Al-Salim Al-Sabah suspended four articles of the constitution concerned with political and civil rights (freedom of the press and dissolution of the legislature) and the assembly itself. In 1981, the suspended articles of the constitution were reinstated along with the National Assembly.

In 1982, the government submitted sixteen constitutional amendments that, among other things, would have allowed the emir to declare martial law for an extended period and would have increased both the size of the legislature and the length of terms of office. In May 1983, the proposals were formally dropped after several months of debate. Nonetheless, the issue of constitutional revisions continued as a topic of discussion in both the National Assembly and the palace.

On 3 July 1986, several articles of the constitution were suspended By Emir Jaber Al-Ahmad Al-Sabah. Opposition to this move emerged; the pro-parliament movement of 1989–90 took its name, the Constitutional Movement, from the demand for a return to constitutional life. This opposition became somewhat more pronounced following the Iraqi occupation, which abrogated all constitutional rights, and following Kuwait's return to sovereignty in 1991. In early 1992, press restrictions were lifted. After the October 1992 election, the National Assembly exercised its constitutional right to review all emiri decrees promulgated while the assembly was in dissolution.

On 10 May 2024, the Emir Mishal Al-Ahmad Al-Sabah suspended seven articles of the constitution, mainly related to the parliament. In the Emiri decree suspending parliament, it stated the suspension is intended for a period not exceeding four years.
