= 1961 Kuwaiti Constitutional Convention election =

Constitutional Convention elections were held in Kuwait on 30 December 1961, having originally been planned for 1 November. Voters elected a body responsible for drawing up a constitution. Around 40,000 men were eligible to vote, with turnout of registered voters at 90%. A total of 74 candidates stood for the 20 elected seats.

== Results ==
Party	Votes	%	Seats
Merchants			10
Liberals			5
Tribal candidates			3
Shi'ite candidates			2
Nominated members			11
Total			31
Total votes	10,159	–	
Registered voters/turnout	11,288	90.00	
Source: Nohlen et al.
