= Terrorism in Kuwait =

Kuwait has experienced various terror attacks, including those carried out by ISIS, Al-Qaeda, and other acts of Islamic terrorism. Various terror attacks in Kuwait were associated with the Iran–Iraq War, Gulf War, and the subsequent American military support in Kuwait.

Kuwait currently has the largest US military presence in the entire Middle East region. There are over 14,000 US military personnel stationed in the country.

== 1970s ==
- 1974 attack on the Japanese Embassy in Kuwait
- June 17, 1976: The Al-Anba newspaper building was bombed. editorial offices were destroyed. Five people, including the editor-in-chief, were wounded.

== 1980s ==
- December 1983 – 1983 Kuwait Bombing were attacks on six key installations in Kuwait.
- April 1985 – Ahmed Al-Jarallah was subjected to an assassination attempt when a gunman opened fire on him outside his offices. He was shot six times.
- May 1985 – A failed assassination attempt was made on Sheikh Jaber Al-Sabah, who was the emir of Kuwait at the time.
- July 1985 – 1985 Kuwait City bombings in which two coffeehouses were bombed.
- January 1987 – Bomb exploded in a shopping district on the eve of the Organization of Islamic Conference meeting.
- July 1987 – Car bombs exploded in a fashionable shopping district, killing two people and blowing the facades off several stores.
- 1984–1988 Aircraft hijackings

== 1990s ==
Several terror attacks associated with the Gulf War and an assassination attempt on actor Abdulhussain Abdulredha for an anti-Iraq theatrical play.

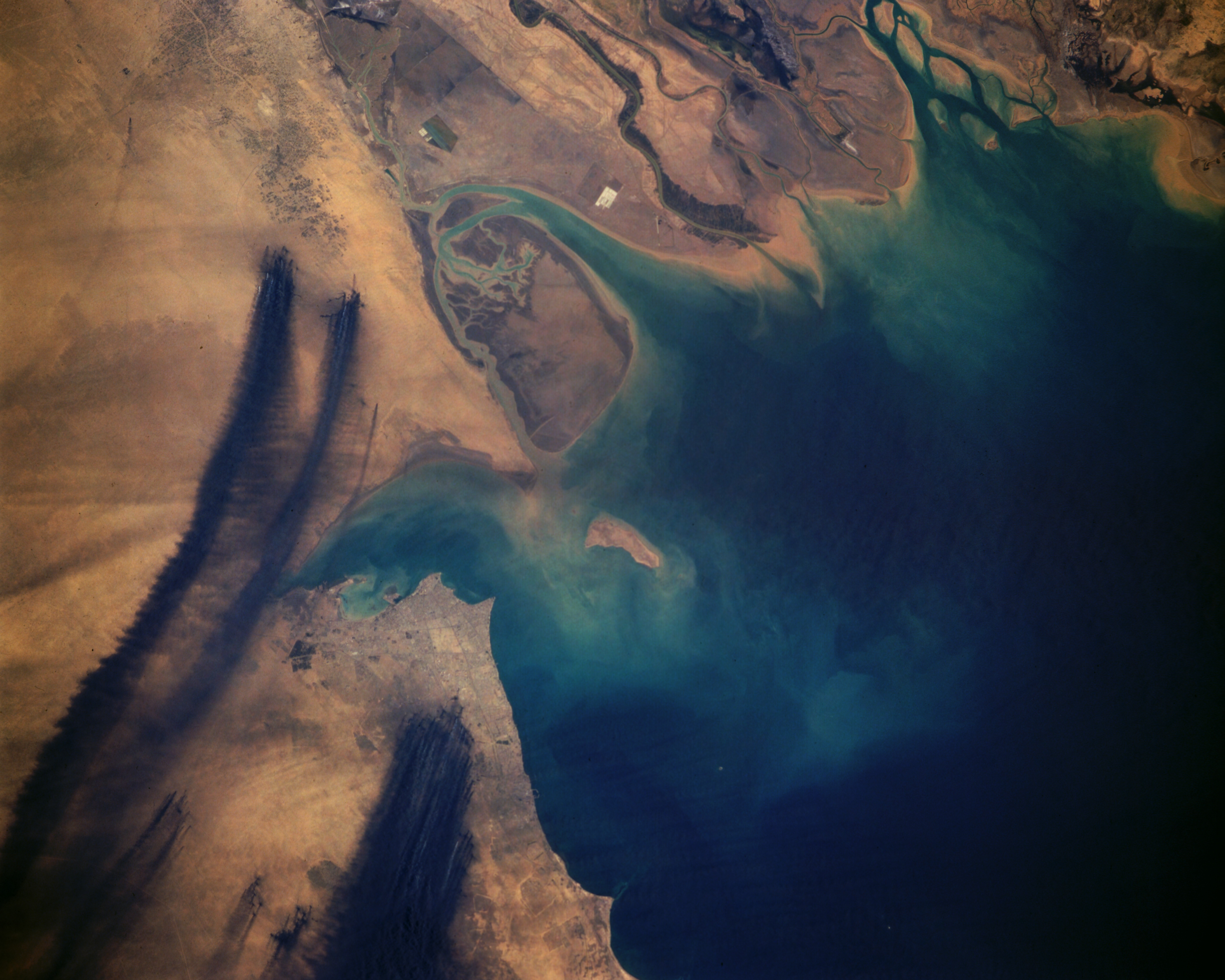
Smoke from burning Kuwait oil fields after Saddam Hussein set fire to during Gulf war.

== 2000s ==
- October 8, 2002 – Failaka Island attack, in which two Kuwaiti citizens with ties to jihadists in Afghanistan attacked a group of unarmed United States Marines conducting a training exercise on Failaka island, killing one before being killed themselves.
- October 10, 2002 – Two gunmen with ties to Al-Qaeda open fire on an American Humvee.
- November 21, 2002 – Two American contractors with Tapestry Corporation were wounded while driving a civilian vehicle when a Kuwaiti police sergeant opened fire at them at close range.
- January 31, 2005 – Kuwait Police infiltrate a terrorist cell belonging to the Peninsula Lions in a Salmiya apartment complex. Five terrorist members and a civilian bystander were killed.
- August 11, 2009 – Kuwaiti authorities reported that they had arrested six individuals accused of planning attacks on U.S. troops stationed at Camp Arifjan. The six men allegedly belong to a terrorist group with ties to Al-Qaeda.
- December 11, 2003 – Ahmed Al-Jarallah's secretary at Al-Seyassah was injured when he opened a large envelope addressed to Jarallah, sent from Beirut, Lebanon. The envelope bomb contained the plastic explosive Semtex.

== 2010s ==
- June 26, 2015 – 2015 Kuwait mosque bombing – A bombing occurred during Friday prayer at masjid Imam al-Sadeq when a man was seen on surveillance cameras rushing into the masjid and then detonating himself. 27 people killed with 227 injured. ISIS has claimed responsibility for the bombing. It was the largest terror attack in Kuwait's history.
- August 13, 2015 – Kuwaiti security forces arrested Al-Abdali terror cell belonging to Iran and Hezbollah.
- 2017 – No terrorist incidents were reported in Kuwait in 2017, despite various attempts by ISIS.

== 2020s ==
- January 25, 2024 – Kuwaiti security forces arrested 3 Tunisians over ISIS terrorist plot to bomb Shiite places of worship.
