= Mazen Al-Tarazi =

Syrian businessperson

Mazen Al Tarazi
- مازن سمير الترزي
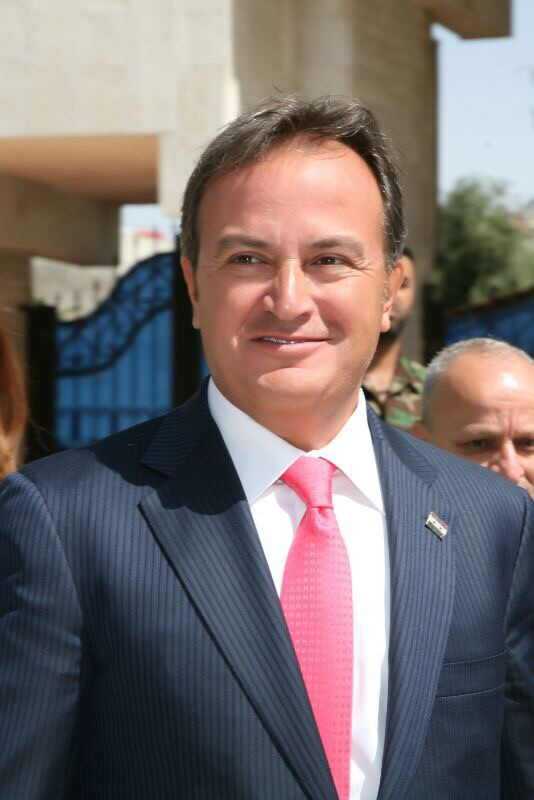
- Born: Mazen Samir Tarazi; 1962 (age 63–64); Saidnaya, Syria
- Citizenship: Syria - Canada
- Known for: Al-Hadaf Magazine; Marota City; Alwataniya Air (National Airline Company LLC, Syria)

Mazen Samir Al-Tarazi (Arabic: مازن الترزي; born 1962), also known as Mazen Al Tarazi and Mazin Al Tarazi, is a Syrian-Canadian businessman with close ties to the former Ba’athist Syrian government of Bashar al-Assad.

He has significant activities in the media sector in Kuwait. He is the founder and CEO of Marketing Group for Advertising, Publishing and Distribution and the Dar al-Hadaf Newspaper Company, which he founded with Kuwaiti businessman Ahmed Al-Jarallah. Until December 2022, he was a board member of Dar Al Seyassah Company for Printing, Publishing and Distribution WLL in Kuwait, the publisher of the Arab Times and Al-Seyassah newspapers.

He was sanctioned by the United Kingdom and European Union for his material support to the Syrian regime of Bashar al-Assad.

== Early life ==
Al-Tarazi was born in Damascus in 1962, and he started his career in Kuwait as a printing press worker at Al Anba and Al Rai newspapers, then as a manager at Al Waseet classified advertising paper owned by Syrian businessman Bashar Kiwan.

== Career and connection with Bashar al-Assad ==
He initially became a manager at Kuwaiti daily newspaper Al-Seyassah.

He later partnered with the owner of Al-Seyassah, Kuwaiti businessman Ahmed Al-Jarallah, to launch weekly magazine Al-Hadaf operating under Dar al-Hadaf Newspaper Company.

He was named in the Panama Papers as the sole owner of First Kingston Investments Ltd., registered in the British Virgin Islands. He is partner in Al-Waseet classifieds paper in Jordan with Syrian-French businessman Bashar Kiwan

Al-Tarazi developed close ties to the Syrian regime of Bashar al-Assad. He was relatively unknown in Syria until 2014, when he provided a private plane to transport Syrians from Kuwait to Syria to vote for Bashar al-Assad in presidential elections. In 2015, he acquired the Sheraton Ma'aret Sednaya Hotel & Resort. In 2017, his company National Airline Company LLC was granted a license for Syria's second private airline, Alwataniya Air.

Al-Tarazi partnered with Damascus Governorate and Damascus Cham Private Joint Stock Company in reconstructing a new city, Marota City, in the Basateen al-Razi area in the Mezzeh district of Damascus, in two projects. The first is a $250m, 120,000 sqm shopping mall and six other buildings, and the second are give properties worth $70m.

== Controversies ==
=== Sanctions ===
In 2019, Al-Tarazi was sanctioned by the European Union. In 2020, he was sanctioned by the United Kingdom "benefitting from and/or supporting the Syrian regime." In 2021, the EU General Court dismissed an application by Mazen Al Tarazi to annul his inclusion in the Syria sanctions list.

=== Arrest in Kuwait ===
ARAB TIMES - KUWAIT
(@arabtimeskuwait)
tweeted:

Severance of Relationship with Mazen Al Tarazi, a #Syrian national who also holds #Canadian citizenship

6 December 2022

In March 2019, Kuwaiti authorities arrested Al-Tarazi and four employees of Al-Hadaf Magazine after the magazine's headquarters were raided, reportedly on charges of money laundering and publishing without a license.

In March 2019, the Arab Times, owned by Al-Tarazi's business partner, Ahmed Al-Jarallah, published an article describing the allegations of money laundering against of Al-Tarazi as "concocted lies, as several bloggers have raised unfounded allegations in the past against notable personalities in the country, which clearly damaged their reputations and defamed their personalities".

In December 2022, Al-Jarallah released a statement in his newspaper, the Arab Times announcing his "severance of any relationship with the so-called Mazen Al Tarazi".
