= List of newspapers in Kuwait =

Newspapers in Kuwait are published in English, French and Urdu, in addition to Arabic. The number of newspapers published reached the peak in 2009, when there were 14 Arabic dailies, three English dailies and a dozens weekly newspapers in Kuwait. But the numbers have decreased since then, possibly on account of the 2008 financial crisis, the increase of digital news sources or by government censorship.

Al-Kuwait Al-Yawm, first published in 1954, is solely the government gazette used for public matters and not used for journalistic reporting. Publishing certain actions in the gazette is necessary for them to become legally valid, like in instances of name changes.

This is an incomplete list of newspapers in Kuwait.

== Arabic language daily newspapers ==
- Al-Seyassah — Daily since 1965
- Al-Qabas — Since 1972
- Al-Anbaa — Since 1976
- Al Rai — Alrai-Alaam from 1995 until 2006
- Annahar — Since 2007
- Al-Shahed — Since 2007
- Al-Jarida — Since 2007
- Al-Wasat — Since 2007

== English language daily and weekly newspapers ==
- Kuwait Times — Since 1961
- Arab Times — Since 1977

== Non-daily newspapers ==
- Al Kuwait Magazine — Since 1928
- Al-Arabi — Since 1958
- Sout Al Khaleej — Since 1962
- Al Bayan — Since 1966
- Afaaq — Since 1978
- Al Mouasher Economic Weekly — Since 1994
- The Times Kuwait — English weekly since 1996
- Al Dustor — Semi-daily since 1997 from Kuwait National Assembly
- Dark Politics — Since 2018
- ECOnews — Since 2024

== Defunct newspapers ==
- Al-Sabah - 2007-2025
- Al Kuwaiteya — 2011-2023
- Al Khaleej —2009-2020
- Al Shahed weekly — 2004-2019
- Al Taleea — 1962-2016
- Al-Watan —1974-2015
- AlRay AlAam -1962–1995
- Alam Al Yawm — 2007-2014
- Al-Daar - 2008-2013
- Al-Watan Daily - 2008-2013
- Al Mustagbal - 2010-2012
- Al-Hureya - 2008-2012
- Arrouiah - 2007–2010
- Awan - 2007–2010
- Assawt - 2008–2009
- Al Balad 2008
- Sawt alKuwait - 1990–1993 during the Invasion of Kuwait by State of Kuwait government
- Alfajer Aljadeed - 1991–1993 was published by Mr. Yousif Olyan and Dr.Yasin Taha Al-Yasin
- 26 Febrayer - 1991
- Al-Nida' - 1990–1991 during the Invasion of Kuwait by Republic of Kuwait government
- Al Morabtoon - 1990-1991
- Al jamaheer - 1983-1990
- The Daily News - 1963-1977
