= Shukri Anis Fakhoury =

Lebanese screenwriter and novelist

- شكري انيس فاخوري
- Born: Shukri George Fakhoury; 15 February 1953 (age 73); Damascus, Syria
- Education: Lebanese University (B.A.)
- Occupations: Screenwriter, novelist, publisher, academic
- Spouse: Yolande Amin Estephan (m. 1976)
- Children: 2
- Writing career
- Language: Arabic
- Period: 1963–present
- Notable awards: Multiple Murex d'Or awards for best screenwriter

Shukri Anis Fakhoury (Arabic: شكري انيس فاخوري; alternatively spelled in various sources as Chikri, Chikry, Choukri, Choukry, Shekri, Shoukry; born 2 December 1953) is a prolific Lebanese screenwriter and novelist, and the creator of a great number of successful Lebanese television drama series.

== Early life and education ==
Fakhoury was born in Damascus, Syria on 15 February 1953 to a family of Lebanese Tripolitans. He was the lone child of George Anis Fakhoury, a writer and an intellectual and Loris, the sister of Michel and Fouad Moukarzel who edited and published the satirical Ad-Dabbour (The Wasp) newspaper.

Fakhoury grew up in Beirut, where he received his education. He was strongly influenced by his father’s idealistic and disciplined writing style. The two had a strong bond of friendship despite the father's prolonged periods of time away from home. Loris assumed both parental roles during her husband's professional travels, and after his premature death due to a traffic accident in Kuwait in 1979.

Fakhoury received his Brevet certificate from an-Nahda School in Achrafieh; he was encouraged by his aunt Alice Moukarzel to develop his flair for literature. When he was 10 years old, Shukri wrote his first literary piece Risala ila ummi (a letter to my mother), which was published in Ad-Dabbur. He wrote his first novel Intisar al-abtal at the age of 14, followed shortly thereafter by Aqwa min Al-qadar (Stronger than destiny) and Jasad wa-imra'a (A body and a woman). Fakhoury also dabbled with poetry during his adolescent years and directed theatrical sketches with his playmates, for which they charged the attendees a quarter lira.

Fakhoury attended the Christian Teaching Institute in Ashrafieh for his secondary education where he chose, and graduated with a humanities and literature concentration. In 1971, he attended the Lebanese University Faculty of Arts, from which he graduated with a BA in Arabic language and literature in 1975. Fakhoury was offered, but because of his primarily English education, could not benefit from a scholarship at the French Sorbonne University.

== Career ==
Fakhoury started teaching at the age of 18 after obtaining his high school diploma, he taught at an-Nahda among other Lebanese schools until he graduated from university. After his BA, he traveled to Kuwait to work with his father as an Arabic content and printed media supervisor at the OPEC. While in Kuwait, he wrote Al-Ja'i`on (The hungry), a three part book series addressing youth romantic relationships. He also wrote for Kuwaiti newspapers and periodicals such as Al-Anbaa', Al-Qabas, AlRay AlAam, and Al-Watan.

Fakhoury heads the audiovisual department at the Al-Kafaàt University in Ain Saadeh, Lebanon.

=== Novels ===
Fakhoury returned to Lebanon in 1981 where he established a commercial printing press Markaz Lubnan al-Fanni (Lebanon Center of Arts), he also published Ghibtatahu wal-Shaykh (His Beatitude and the Sheikh).

Shukri Fakhoury assumed the pen-name, and is widely known as Shukri Anis Fakhoury. He adopted his grandfather's first name as his pseudonymical middle name.

=== Television writing ===
In 1986 Fakhoury wrote his first screenplay for Al-Lawha al-Akhira (The last painting), adapted as a telemovie that aired on the Lebanese public television, Télé Liban in 1988. The show was followed by Muthnibun wa Lakin (Guilty but) and many others.

His 1993 La amsa ba`d alyawm (No past after today), which he wrote of the Lebanese Broadcasting Corporation, garnered general praise from the Lebanese audience. Between 1994 and 2001 he wrote drama series solely for Télé Liban; during this period he produced the telemovie Ath-thalj ad-dafi' (The warm snow), and several series including Rabih alhobb (The spring of love), Al-`assifa tahobb marratayn (The storm blows twice), Nisa' fi al`asifa (Women in the storm), and Ismuha la (Her name is No).

Fakhoury wrote Ghadan yawmon akhar (Tomorrw is another day) for MTV Lebanon and As-sabil (The way) for the Christian satellite television SAT7 before returning to LBC to write the Hikayat series. Fakhoury also collaborated with Al-Jadeed TV.

In a 2021 interview, Fakhoury attributed his absence from the TV scene to his circumspect writing style, and to production entities competition resulting in putting some of his works on hold. The independent producers he usually collaborates with are at a disadvantage against big rival production companies. He said that three of his works are ready for the screen, among which a series about the assassinated former Lebanese Prime Minister Rafic Hariri, which was stopped for political reasons, and a sequel to his successful Al `assifa tahubbu marratayn called Al `assifa tahubbu min jadid (The storm blows again).

=== Film ===
Fakhoury wrote Sarkhet hobb (Love cry) for the Egyptian movie director Safwat Ghattas; Al-jom`a 7:30 (Friday at 7:30) was another movie scheduled for 2006, but the production was interrupted by the 2006 Lebanon-Israel conflict, and according to Fakhoury, because of the politically-sensitive plot. He wrote Zafafian, a romantic comedy released in 2017.

== Influence and Lebanese popular culture ==
Fakhoury was praised for seeking audience feedback and plot development suggestions while writing future series episodes. He is series are credited for choosing, and bringing forth popular young acting talents, including Cyrine Abdelnour, and former Miss Lebanon Nadine Nassib Njeim.

=== Al `asifa ===
In 1994, Fakhoury wrote al `assifa tahubbu marratayn for Télé Liban which was originally planned as a 7 episode miniseries. The series was so successful that after airing the fourth episode, Télé Liban CEO Foud Naim commissioned Fakhoury to bring up the number of episodes to a hundred. The series was directed by Milad al-Hachem, with a Lebanese star-studded cast including Roula Hamadeh, Fady Ibrahim, and Ward al-Khal.

Fakhouy's drama series had a lasting impact on Lebanese pop culture; during the mid-1990s and early 2000s, Lebanese teenagers youth identified with character's such as Nader Sabbagh, the quintessential womanizer (played by Fady Ibrahim), and Jamal Salem, the strong-willed woman played by Roula Hamadeh. Télé Liban administration capitalized on the show's success, and organized meet-and-greet events attended by masses of fans. The show was a record-breaker in terms of audience, and was the longest running Lebanese drama series, with a total of 177 episodes.

== Personal life ==
Fakhoury married Yolande Amin Estephan in 1976, they have two sons, Hisham and Omar.

== Views ==
Fakhoury comes from a family that is known for its Syrian nationalism beliefs; some of his works, particularly the 'Assifa series, were criticized by some Lebanese for carrying Syrian Nationalist connotations. In 2021 he commented that the October 17 Revolution was merely a movement and would not qualify as a revolution as long as it is peaceful and unarmed.

== Selected works ==
- Ghibtatahou Wal Sheikh (His Eminence and the Sheikh), 2022
- al-`sfour wa qafas an-nar (The bird and the cage of fire), book series
- yawma sujina 'abi (The day my father was jailed), book series
- jaddi wal-ard (My father and the land), book series
- as-sayd ath-thameen (The precious catch), novel
- iqta3 wa3dan (Promise!), novel
- wahdaha al-mahabba (Only love), novel

== Sources ==
- Abdel-Salam, Shaymaa' (2021-11-18). "برفقة صديقاتها..أحدث ظهور لنادين نجيم عبر إنستجرام" [Around friends.. Nadine Njeim's latest appearance on Instagram]. صدى البلد (in Arabic). Archived from the original on 2021-11-18.
- Al-Hassnaa editorial staff (2017-03-31). "شكري أنيس فاخوري لـ "الحسناء": فشروا.. ينضبوا كلن سوا" [Shukri Anis Fakhoury to “Al-Hasnaa”: To hell with them all...]. Al-Hassnaa`.
- B, M (2016-04-07). "8 مسلسلات لبنانية طُوي عهدها لكنها لا تزال في الذاكرة" [8 unforgettable Lebanese series]. annahar (in Arabic). Archived from the original on 2022-03-05.
- Bannout, Hiam (2021-03-21). "شكري أنيس فاخوري: الغزارة تهدد الكتابة الدرامية" [Shukri Anis Fakhoury: Exuberance threatens dramatic writing]. Independent Arabia. Saudi Research and Marketing Group.
- Bou Abdo, George (2021-08-24). "شكري أنيس فاخوري: المسلسلات الدرامية ليست للترفيه فقط" [Shukri Anis Fakhoury: Drama series are not only for entertainment]. Nidaa` al-watan. Beirut: Nidaa` al-watan. Archived from the original on 2022-03-05.
- Fakhoury, Chikry Anis (2022-01-16). Ghibtatahou Wal Sheikh (his Eminence and the Sheikh). allBooks, Incorporated. ISBN 978-1-955226-15-8.
- Hachem, Patricia (2012-01-01). "بالصوت- شكري أنيس فاخوري لباتريسيا هاشم: كارمن لبس خذلتني وكريستين شويري أيضاً؛ سيرين عبد النور تعرف جيداً من اطلقها في عالم التمثيل؛ لم اتبن نادين نسيب نجيم ولا أعرف ماذا يحاك في ال بي سي" [Audio - Shukri Anis Fakhoury to Patricia Hashem: Carmen Lebbos failed me and Christine Choueiri too; Cyrine Abdel Nour knows very well who launched her into the world of acting; I did not adopt Nadine Nassib Njeim, and I do not know what is being played on LBC]. Bisara7a.
- Haddad, Viviane (2008-07-11). "شكري أنيس فاخوري: القصة اللبنانية اليوم أكثر واقعية," [Shukri Anis Fakhoury: Lebanese storytelling of today is more realistic]. archive.aawsat.com.
- Khazaal, Natalie (2018-11-15). Pretty Liar: Television, Language, and Gender in Wartime Lebanon. Syracuse University Press. ISBN 978-0-8156-5451-3.
- Kraidy, Marwan; Murphy, Patrick D. (2004-02-24). Global Media Studies: An Ethnographic Perspective. Routledge. ISBN 978-1-134-38013-8.
- Mansour, Thérèse (October 2010). "أسماء لامعة - شكـري أنيس فاخوري [Brilliant names - Shukri Anis Fakhoury]". مجلة الجيش [Army Magazine] (304). Yarze, Lebanon: Lebanese Army Command - Directorate of Orientation. Archived from the original on 2022-03-03.
- Naasy, Liliane (2013-09-09). "شكري انيس فاخوري يعبّر عن هاجسه وهذا ما قاله عن الممثلين والكتّاب اللبنانيين" [Shukri Anis Fakhoury expresses his obsession, and this is what he said about Lebanese actors and writers]. Bisara7a. Archived from the original on 2022-03-05.
