= Flight 221 =

Flight 221 may refer to:

- Aeropesca Colombia Flight 221, crashed on 26 August 1981
- Kuwait Airways Flight 221, hijacked on 3 December 1984
- Gabon Express Flight 221, crashed on 8 June 2004
