= Abdulaziz F. Al-Masaeed =

Kuwaiti politician and journalist (1915–2001)

Abdulaziz Al-Masaeed
- عبد العزيز فهد المساعيد
- Born: Abdulaziz Fahad Al-Masaeed; 1915; Sheikhdom of Kuwait
- Died: July 9, 2001 (aged 85–86); Switzerland
- Known for: Al Rai Alaam newspaper

Abdulaziz Fahad Al-Masaeed (Arabic: عبد العزيز فهد المساعيد; 1915 – July 9, 2001) was a Kuwaiti journalist, businessman, and member of parliament. He founded Kuwait's first newspaper, Alrai Alaam, in 1961.

== Background ==
Abdulaziz Al-Masaeed was born in 1915 in the Sheikhdom of Kuwait, and was a member of parliament from 1967 to 1971. He contested the 1981 parliamentary elections but lost. He contested the 1990 Kuwaiti National Council election and was elected its chairman.

== Journalistic activity ==
In April 1961, Al-Masaeed launched Al Rai Alaam, the first newspaper in Kuwait. Al Masaeed was both the owner and the publisher of the newspaper that was initially published in Beirut, Lebanon. Later it was relaunched as a daily based in Kuwait. In 1965, he founded the weekly magazine Al-Seyassah with Kuwaiti journalist Ahmed Al-Jarallah as its editor-in-chief. He was a founding member of the Kuwait journalists association and called the dean of the Kuwaiti press. He was Editor-in-Chief of the English newspaper “The Daily News” in 1964.
