= Abdullah Al-Nafisi =

Kuwaiti politician and academic

- عبدالله النفيسي
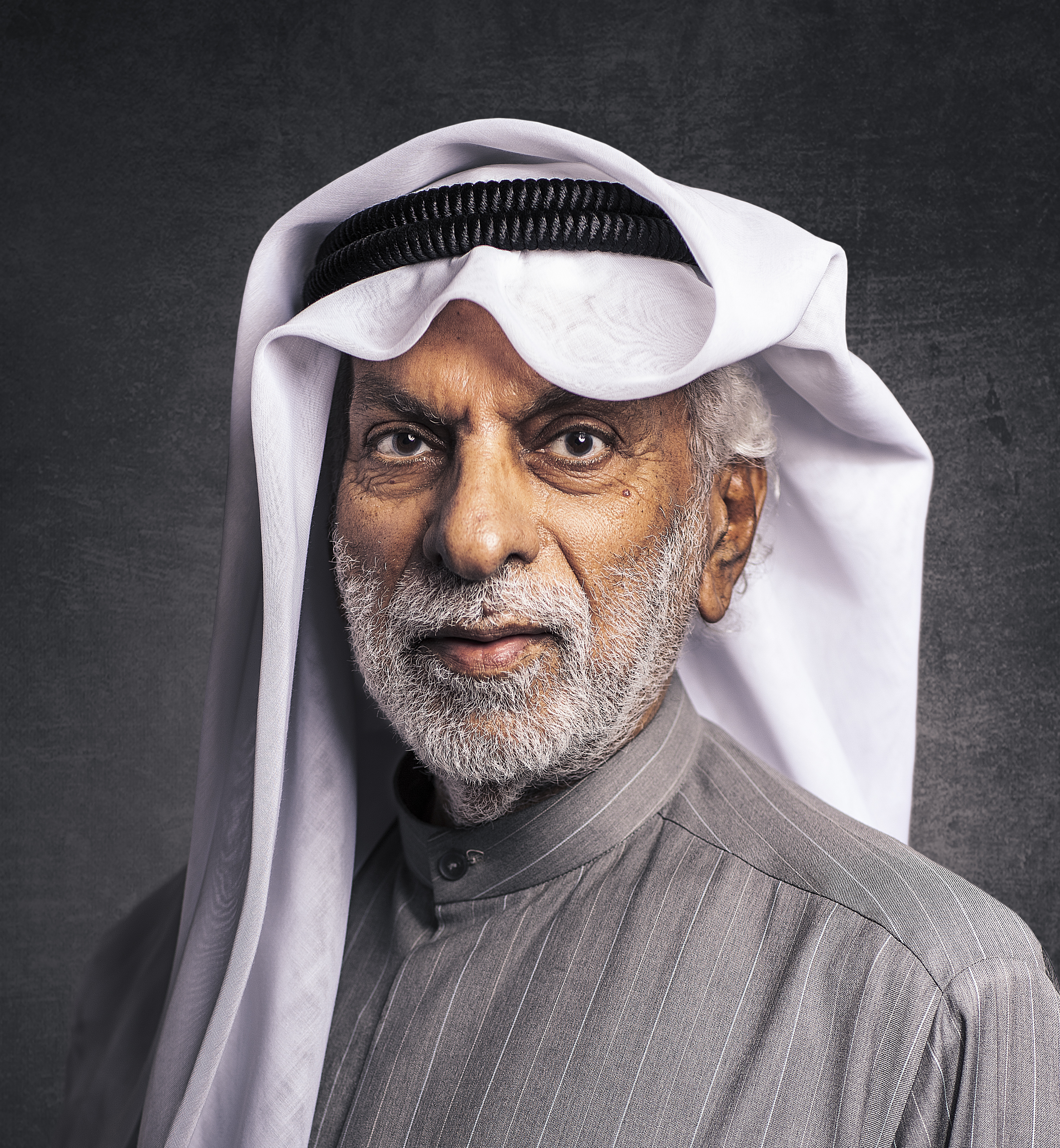

Member of the National Assembly
- In office March 9, 1985 – July 3, 1986
- Constituency: Eighth District

Personal details
- Born: 1945 (age 80–81) Jibla, Kuwait
- Profession: Academic

Abdullah Fahad Al-Nafisi (Arabic: عبد الله فهد النفيسي, born 1945 in Kuwait) is a Kuwaiti politician and academic. He graduated from The University of Cambridge in 1972. He was a member of the National Assembly of Kuwait in 1985.

== Early life ==
Abdullah Fahad Abdullah Abdulaziz Al-Nafisi was born on 1945 in Freej Soud, Jibla, Kuwait. Al-Nafisi is from the Al-Nafsiah family that originated from Mutayr tribe. In 1951, Abdullah and his brother Ghazi moved to Egypt to study in Victoria College in Alexandria. Initially, Abdullah went to study medicine in Manchester. In 1962, Abdullah read Why I Am Not a Christian by Bertrand Russell, which caused him to question his faith and led him to leave Manchester and go back to Kuwait to learn and research more about Islam.

== Education and academia ==
He earned his Bachelor's degree from the American University of Beirut in 1967 and a PhD in Political Science from Churchill College at Cambridge University in Britain in 1972.

After his graduation in 1972, Al-Nafisi worked as a professor of political science Kuwait University. He was later promoted to president at the College of Political Science on 1974. On 1978, he was fired from Kuwait University and got his passport confiscated for two years following the release of his book Kuwait, the other opinion. After getting his passport back, Abdullah worked at the United Arab Emirates University in Al Ain from 1981 until 1984. He has a doctorate in political science from the University of Cambridge. Between 1973 and 1980, he was active as a visiting professor at Peking University, Moscow State University, Harvard, Cambridge, Stanford and the University of Exeter.

== Parliamentary Career ==
=== Member of Parliament (1985-1986) ===
Abdullah Al-Nafisi decided to run in the 1985 Kuwaiti general election in the Eighth District. He was considered to be a candidate closely affiliated to the Muslim Brotherhood in Kuwait. He got first place in that district with 951 votes. He was a member of majority anti-government bloc in parliament. On 23 June 1986, Abdullah Al-Nafisi and Jassim Al-Qatami decided to interrogate Minister of Oil Ali Al-Khalifa Al-Sabah regarding Santa Fe International oil exploration company. Three other interrogations were announced on the same week leading to the unconstitutional dissolution of 1985 session, ending Al-Nafisi’s career as MP on July 3, 1986.

=== Post-membership (1986-1996) ===
On 15 July 1986, Abdullah Al-Nafisi was part of the joint statement that involved 32 MPs of the dissolved assembly. The joint statement demanded the reinstatement of all suspended constitutional articles. On December 1989 until May 1990, Al-Nafisi was part of the “Monday Dewaniyas” movement that demanded the reinstatement of the constitution. On 14 May, Abdullah Al-Nafisi and Jassim Al-Qatami were detained following Abdullah’s statement at Al-Qatami’s Dewaniya. During his detainment, Abdulaziz Al-Sager’s petition was published on the 16th of May which he was previous signatory before his detainment. The petition demanded the boycott of the unconstitutional election of 1990. He was detained at Kaifan Police Station for eight days and released on the 23rd of May.

Following the invasion of Kuwait, Sabawi Ibrahim demanded from Nasser Al-Sane to form the government of the Republic of Kuwait. Which included Abdullah Al-Nafisi as minister and other members of the Kuwait opposition. The Kuwaiti opposition, including Al-Sane & Al-Nafisi, promptly rejected the proposal. On 13 October, Abdullah was part of the Kuwaiti Popular Conference in Jeddah. The conference resulted in the support of the return of the House of Sabah and the full reinstatement of the 1962 constitution. After the 1992 election, Abdullah was appointed as speaker Ahmed Al-Sadoun’s advisor, a post he held until 1996.

== Works ==
Al-Nafisi wrote at least 17 published books and multiple articles in Al-Mugtama magazine.

His first publication was called The role of Shi’a in the modern political development of Iraq for his PhD Thesis in 1972 for Cambridge University. While he was a professor at Kuwait University, Al-Nafisi had a deep interest in the Dhofar War. It caused him to study the conflict in the battlefield documenting it in his book Conflict in Dhofar (1975).

After the unconstitutional dissolution of the 1975 National Assembly, Abdullah wrote a dissenting book about the political situation in Kuwait which was published in 1978 called Kuwait, the other opinion. The book was later banned from publication in Kuwait.

In 1980, Al-Nafisi wrote two books about Islam in politics called Islam Rule and Sharia Policy. After the founding of the Gulf Cooperation Council in 1981, Al-Nafisi immediately authored a book regarding the future of institution called Gulf Cooperation Council: The Strategic Framework (1982).

Al-Nafisi authored two books in 1986 called The Islamic Movement: Gaps in the Road and The role of students in political work. He authored his autobiography called From the days of the past in 2014.
