= Hasan Bin Uthman =

- حسن بن عثمان
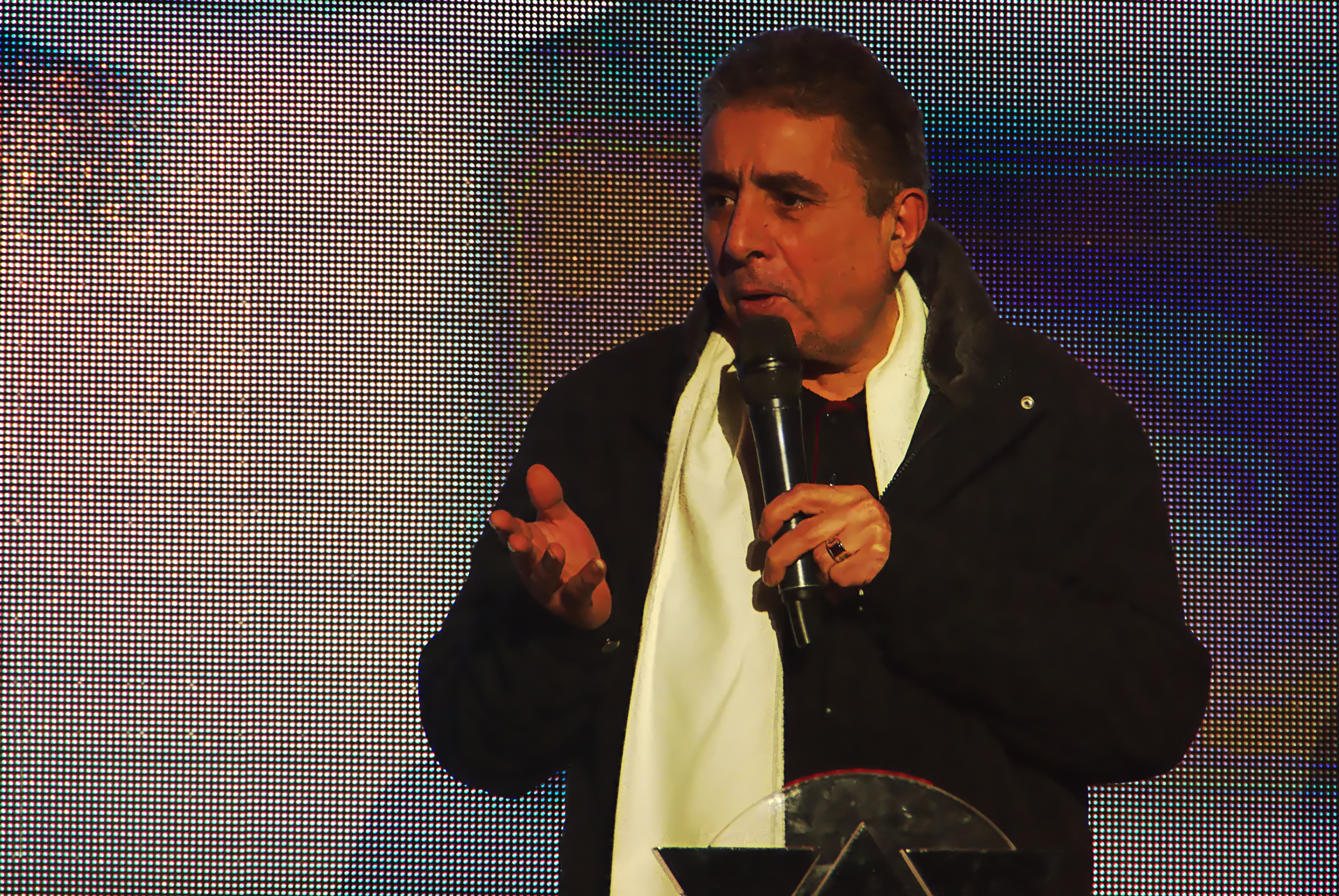
- Born: 12 February 1959 (age 67); Skalba, Menzel Temime, Nabeul Governorate
- Occupations: Writer, journalist
- Awards: Comar d'Or in 1999 for "Promosport"

Hasan Bin Uthman (/ʿuthmān/; Arabic: حسن بن عثمان; born on 12 February 1959) is a Tunisian writer and journalist. He was born in the town of Skalba, Menzel Temime, Nabeul Governorate.

== Career ==
He began his career in the 1980s with many opposing and independent stances and contributed to articles in several Arab newspapers and magazines such as Kul al-Arab that issues in Paris and Kuwait's Al-Qabas. He founded and supervised the establishment of several cultural pages and supplements in the weekly newspaper Al-Mustaqbal and the weekly supplement of "Cultural Papers" (original title: Waraqāt Thaqāfīyah). He was the editor-in-chief of the cultural section of the newspaper AlRay AlAam in 1993.

He then joined the Ministry of Culture of Tunisia and became the editor-in-chief of its cultural magazine "Cultural Life" (original title: al-Ḥayāt al-Thaqāfīyah) from 1996 to 2006.

== Post-Revolution ==
He was known for the saying "Ben Ali is dead" which he uttered during a show that aired on the Tunisie 7 (now called El Watania 1) on 4 January 2011. After the revolution, he participated in several Tunisian TV shows including "To Who Dares Only" (original title: Li-man Yajruʾ Faqat) and “Screen Monster” (original title: Waḥsh al-Shāshah) with the media figure Samir ElWafi. He was known for many interferences that later remained in the watchers’ minds.

== Works ==
- 1986: "Abbas Loses His Mind" (original title: ʿAbbās Yafqid al-Ṣawāb)
- 1990: "With Abd al-Rahman al-Haila: On Life and Religion" (original title: Maʿ ʿAbd al-Raḥmān al-Hailah: Fī Shuʾūn al-Dīn wa-al-Dunyah)
- 1991: "Neither Above the Ground, nor Below" (original title: Lā Fawqa al-Arḍ, Lā Taḥtahā)
- 1998: "Promosport: The Five Ground Rules to Win the Sports Betting" (original title: Brūmūsbūr: al-Qawāʿid al-Khams li-allFawz bi-al-Rihān al-Riyāḍī: Riwāyah)
- 2000: "Night of the Nights" (original title: Laylat al-Layālī)
- 2002: "Two Sheikhs" (original title: Shaykhān)
- 2009: "The Woman and Her Veil", co-written with Raja Ben Slama (original title: al-Marʾah wa-Ḥijābuhā)
- 2011: "Bourguiba Children" (original title: Aṭfāl Būrqībah: Riwāyah)
- 2014: "The Blue Tale: The Moon Shining on Tunis-Carthage International Airport" (original title: Al-Riwāyah al-Zarqāʾ: Ḥīn Ṭalaʿa al-Badru ʿAlayna fī Maṭār Tūnis Qirṭāj al-Duwalī)
- 2017: "The Drunken Tunisia" (original title: Tūnis al-Sakrānah)

== Awards ==
Hasan Bin Uthman won the COMAR d'Or prize in 1999 for his work "Promosport: The Five Ground Rules to Win the Sports Betting”. It became a film adaptation under the title “The Word of Men" (original title: Kalimat Rijāl) in 2004 which was directed by Moez Kamun.
