= 1983–1988 Kuwait terror attacks =

Terror attacks across Kuwait in 1983–1988

- Part of the spillover of the Iran–Iraq War
- Location: Kuwait
- Date: 1983–1988
- Target: Infrastructure (government buildings, embassies, airport, oil tankers, coffehouses, etc)
- Attack type: Suicide bombings, airplane hijackings, missile attacks
- Deaths: 25
- Injuries: 175+
- Perpetrator: Multiple

The 1983–1988 Kuwait terror attacks were various pro-Iran terror attacks during the Iran–Iraq War. 25 people were killed and more than 175 people were wounded. Following the attacks, Kuwait's economy significantly suffered.

== 1983 Kuwait bombings ==
The 1983 Kuwait bombings were attacks on six key installations on 12 December 1983, two months after the 1983 Beirut barracks bombing. The 90-minute coordinated attack on two embassies, the country's main airport, and petro-chemical plant was more notable for the damage it was intended to cause than what was actually destroyed. What might have been "the worst terrorist episode of the twentieth century in the Middle East" killed only six people because of the bombs' faulty rigging.

The perpetrators of the bombing were unknown but were purported to be connected to the Islamic Republic of Iran. The motivation of the bombing is suspected to have been punishment against Kuwait for its military and financial assistance to Iraq in the Iran–Iraq War.

=== Bombings ===
On 12 December 1983, a truck laden with 45 large cylinders of gas connected to plastic explosives broke through the front gates of the American Embassy in Kuwait City and rammed into the embassy's three-story administrative annex, demolishing half the structure. The shock blew out windows and doors in distant homes and shops.

Five people were initially killed (two Palestinians, two Kuwaitis, and one Syrian). The death toll was not higher in large part because the driver did not hit the more heavily populated chancellery building and more importantly, only a quarter of the explosives ignited. An American diplomat told journalist Robin Wright: "If everything had gone off, this place would have been a parking lot".

Five other explosions were attempted within an hour. An hour later, a car parked outside the French embassy blew up, leaving a massive 30 ft hole in the embassy security wall and injuring five people.

The target intended to get the most powerful explosion was Kuwait's main oil refinery and water desalination plant, the Shuaiba Petrochemical Plant. 150 gas cylinders on a truck carrying 200 cylinders exploded 150 meters from the No. 2 refinery and only a few meters from a highly flammable heap of sulfa-based chemicals. Had that bombing been successful, it would have crippled the oil production of one of the world's major oil exporters and shut down most of the water supply of the nation.

Other car bombs exploded at the control tower at the Kuwait International Airport, the Electricity Control Center, and the living quarters for American employees of the Raytheon Corporation, which was installing a missile system in Kuwait. Two bombs at Raytheon went off, the first intended to bring the residents outside and the second intended to kill. The attempt failed as the residents did not emerge. An Egyptian technician was killed in the control tower bombing, but none of the other bombings resulted in fatalities.

The bombing of the American embassy was an early instance of suicide bombing in the Middle East, along with the Hezbollah's bombing of the American Embassy and the bombing of the Marine barracks in Lebanon earlier that year in which Hezbollah is suspected to be the orchestrator.

=== Responsibility ===
Islamic Jihad Organization and Islamic Dawa Party were reported at the time to be involved in the bombing. Shortly after the blasts, Islamic Jihad called Kuwaiti authorities to take responsibility for the blast. The claim was taken seriously after the callers' boast that there was a "seventh bomb" was verified by the discovery of a car bomb in front of the Immigration Bureau.

Islamic Dawa was connected to the bombing when the remains of a human thumb were found and its thumbprint identified as that of Raad Murtin Ajeel, a 25-year-old Iraqi Shia member of Dawa. Ultimately, 21 other defendants were put on trial (17 captured in a nationwide manhunt and 4 tried in absentia). After a six-week trial, six were sentenced to death (three of those were in absentia), seven to life imprisonment, seven to terms between five and fifteen years. One of those convicted by a court in Kuwait in February 2007 was Jamal Jafaar Mohammed, more commonly known by his nom de guerre as Abu Mahdi al-Muhandis, who was a member of Kata'ib Hezbollah and Iraq's parliament and military commander of the Popular Mobilization Forces.

=== Motivation ===
Analysts believe the bombings were the work of Iran in cooperation with Shia allies from Iraq and Lebanon. Kuwait had given considerable support to Iraq in the 1980–1988 Iran–Iraq War. Between 1983 and 1984, Kuwait provided $7 billion in financial assistance and was second to Saudi Arabia in aiding Iraq, Massive destruction and loss of life in Kuwait would also have provided an example to the other oil-rich, population-poor, Arab monarchies of the Persian Gulf, also helping Iraq against its larger, non-Arab, anti-monarchist revolutionary Islamic neighbor. In 1985, the Arab States of the Persian Gulf provided Iraq with financial contributions, totaling in the range of $40 to 50 billion.

Americans and the French are thought to have been targets in Kuwait because of their assistance to Iraq and lack of help to Iran. America had halted all shipments of arms to Iran, and extended $2 billion in trade credit to Iraq in "Operation Staunch" in 1983.

=== Response ===
The blasts were said to have taken the Kuwaiti government "completely by surprise" and left it dumbfounded, terrified and shaken to their core that such a well-organized terrorist operation could have taken place under their noses. According to the Monday Morning gazette, the hitherto relaxed nation was transformed into a "police state," with roundups of foreign workers, numerous roadblocks, identity checks, and guardsmen under orders to "shoot whoever refused to stop or be searched."

=== Pressure on Kuwait to free the bombers ===
Of the "Kuwait 17", 12 were Iraqis in al-Dawa, and 3 were Lebanese. One was Mustafa Badreddine, who was sentenced to death. He was also a cousin and brother-in-law of one of Hezbollah's senior officers, Imad Mugniyah. "Analysts say,... there is little doubt Mugniyeh and Al Din helped plan December 1983 bombings in Kuwait against the U.S. and French embassies there...."

Both the organization of Hezbollah and the Islamic Republic of Iran and the location of Dawa's headquarters helped free their fellow Shia revolutionaries in Kuwait.

In Lebanon, Western hostages, including American Frank Regier and Frenchman Christian Joubert, were held by Shia radicals demanding the release of the al-Dawa terrorists as the price of the hostages' release. On 27 March 1984, following the conviction of the al-Da'wa defendants, the hostage takers threatened to kill their hostages if the Kuwaiti government carried through with the planned execution of the al-Dawa prisoners. A month later, American Benjamin Weir was kidnapped by actors demanding the same. Anglican hostage negotiator Terry Waite appealed to the emir of Kuwait and tried to obtain a visa to come to Kuwait. His failure to make progress in freeing the convicted terrorists is thought to be the reason that he himself was kidnapped and spent five years as a hostage.

Although those sentenced to death were to be hanged within 30 days, the emir of Kuwait did not sign their death sentence. The executions were delayed for years until the men escaped.

==== Iran ====
Chief Kuwaiti government spokesman Abdel Aziz Hussein called the bombings "the first concentrated Iranian operation to export the revolution and destabilize the Persian Gulf after Iran failed to infiltrate the Iraqi [war] front." Kuwait was threatened with further attacks if the defendants were not released, with Tehran Radio regularly broadcasting warnings from Dawa that Kuwait would face "serious consequences" if the "heroes" standing trial were harmed.

==== Hezbollah ====
Over the next several years, Hezbollah perpetrated a string of kidnappings and bombings with the goal of forcing the Kuwaiti government to free the al-Dawa prisoners. Hostage Terry Anderson was told that he and the other hostages kidnapped in Beirut had been abducted "to gain the freedom of their seventeen comrades in Kuwait."

The Kuwait 17 then played a role in the Iran-Contra scandal: the principals of Iran-Contra offered to sway Kuwait to release the Kuwait 17 as one of several incentives to free American hostages in Lebanon. However, when U.S. president Ronald Reagan learned of this offer, he allegedly responded "like he had been kicked in the belly."

== 1984 oil tanker attacks ==
Because Iraq had become landlocked during the course of the Iran-Iraq War, they had to rely on Kuwait to transport their oil. In 1984, Iran started attacking Kuwaiti tankers carrying Iraqi oil from Kuwait. Iran also began attacking Kuwaiti ships (unrelated to Iraq). Iranian speedboat attacks on Kuwaiti shipping eventually led Kuwait to formally petition foreign powers on 1 November 1986 to protect its shipping.

== 1985 attempted assassinations ==
=== Ahmed Al-Jarallah ===
On April 23, 1985, Ahmed Al-Jarallah was subjected to an assassination attempt when a gunman opened fire on him outside his offices. He was shot six times, and was rushed to the nearby Al-Razi Hospital by his driver, seriously injured. An organization under the name Arab Revolutionary Brigades claimed responsibility. It was suspected that Palestinian militant group Abu Nidal Organization (ANO) was behind the assassination attempt. Leaked US diplomatic cables describe observers connecting this assassination attempt to some of Al-Jarallah's political views.

=== Emir Jaber Al-Ahmad ===
By May 1985, Islamic Jihad had accumulated six hostages in Lebanon, four Americans and two French, and on 16 May, it released photos of them promising a "horrible disaster" if the jailed terrorists in Kuwait were not released. On 25 May 1985, a suicide car bomber attacked the motorcade of Kuwaiti ruler Jaber Al-Ahmad Al-Jaber Al-Sabah, killing two bodyguards and a passerby, wounding Jaber. Islamic Jihad claimed responsibility and again demanded the terrorists' release.

== 1985 Kuwait City bombings ==
On 11 July 1985, two bombs exploded in two cafés in Kuwait City, Kuwait, killing 11 people and wounding 89 others.

== 1986 oil installation attack ==
In 1986, one year after an attack on Emir Jaber's motorcade, there was an attack on an oil installation, which almost caused the shutdown of Kuwait's oil industry.

== 1987 Kuwait City bombings ==
In January 1987, a bomb exploded in a shopping district on the eve of the Organization of Islamic Conference meeting. In July 1987, car bombs exploded in a fashionable shopping district, killing two people and blowing the facades off several stores.

== 1987 missile attacks ==
In October 1987, Kuwait's oil terminal was hit by an Iranian Silkworm, which was observed to have originated from the Faw peninsula. The attack prompted Kuwait to deploy a Hawk missile battery on Failaka Island to protect the terminal. In December 1987, another Iranian Silkworm was fired at the terminal, but it struck a decoy barge instead. Prior to these attacks the missile's range was thought to be less than 80 kilometres (50 mi), but these attacks proved that the range exceeded 100 kilometres (62 mi) with Kuwaiti military observers seeing that the missiles originated from the area and tracking them on radar along with US satellite imagery of the launch sites.

== Aircraft hijackings (1984–1988) ==
=== Kuwait Airways Flight 221 ===
On 3 December 1984, a Kuwait Airways flight from Kuwait City to Karachi, Pakistan was hijacked by four Lebanese Shi'a hijackers and diverted to Tehran. The hijackers demand was the release of the Kuwait 17, which was not met. During the course of the standoff women, children and Muslims were released and two American officials from the US Agency for International Development, Charles Hegna and William Stanford, were shot dead and dumped on the tarmac. The few dozen passengers left on board, particularly Americans were threatened and tortured. "Every five minutes there was a frightening incident. There was no letup at all," British flight engineer Neil Beeston told the BBC. Paradoxically, the hijackers released a statement, claiming, "We do not have any enmity toward anyone and we do not intend to deny the freedom of anyone or to frighten anyone...." On the sixth day of the drama, Iranian security forces stormed the plane and released the remaining hostages. Authorities said they would be brought to trial, but the hijackers were released and allowed to leave the country. Some passengers and officials suggested complicity by Iran in the hijacking and that the hostage rescue had been staged. One Kuwaiti and two Pakistani passengers claimed that the hijackers received additional weapons and equipment once the plane had landed, including handcuffs and nylon ropes used to tie passengers to their seats. One American official wondered if the surrender was not preplanned: "You do not invite cleaners aboard an airplane after you have planted explosives, promised to blow up the plane, and read your last will and testament."

The US State Department announced a $250,000 reward for information leading to the arrests of those involved in the hijacking but made no military response. Later press reports linked Hezbollah's Imad Mughniyah to the hijackings.

=== TWA Flight 847 ===
On 14 June 1985, TWA Flight 847 was hijacked en route from Athens to Rome. One of the demands of the hijackers was the release of the 17 prisoners held in Kuwait.

=== Kuwait Airways Flight 422 ===
On 5 April 1988, Kuwait Airways Flight 422 was hijacked from Bangkok to Kuwait with 111 passengers and crew aboard, including three members of the Kuwaiti Royal Family. Six or seven Lebanese men (including Hassan Izz-Al-Din, a veteran of the TWA 847 hijacking) armed with guns and hand grenades forced the pilot to land in Mashhad, Iran, and demanded the release of 17 Shiite Muslims guerrillas held in Kuwait. Lasting 16 days and traveling 3,200 mi from Mashhad in northeastern Iran to Larnaca, Cyprus, and finally to Algiers, it is the longest skyjacking to date. Two passengers, Abdullah Khalidi, 25, and Khalid Ayoub Bandar, 20, both Kuwaitis, were shot dead by the hijackers and dumped on the tarmac in Cyprus. Kuwait did not release the 17 prisoners, and the hijackers were allowed to leave Algiers.

== Aftermath ==
Eventually, the "Kuwait 17" prisoners gained freedom, reportedly during the Iraqi invasion of Kuwait, when 1,300 prisoners escaped from Kuwait's Saidia central prison. The 15 al-Da'wa prisoners were taken into custody and "released to Iran" by Iraqi officials.

Al-Dawa has insisted that the attacks in Kuwait were perpetrated by agents "hijacked" by Iran. In February 2007, journalists reported that Jamal Jaafar Muhammad, who was elected to the Iraqi parliament in 2005 as part of the SCIRI/Badr faction of the United Iraqi Alliance (UIA), was also sentenced to death in Kuwait for planning the al-Dawa bombings.

== See also ==
- 1985 Kuwait City bombings

== Bibliography ==
- Jaber, Hala. Hezbollah : born with a vengeance, New York : Columbia University Press, c1997
- Ranstorp, Magnus, Hizb'allah in Lebanon : The Politics of the Western Hostage Crisis, New York, St. Martins Press, 1997
- Wright, Robin, Sacred Rage : the wrath of militant Isam, Simon and Schuster, 2001
