= Elsayed Hafez =

Egyptian author

- Born: 1948 (age 77–78); Alexandria, Egypt
- Notable work: A Traveler Without Identity (Musafer bla haweyah); Cappuccino; Honey I Am Travelling (Habibati ana msafer)
- Awards: First prize in Theater Writing, Award for Best Author of Children's Theater in Kuwait for Cinderella

Elsayed Hafez (Arabic: السيد حافظ) is an Egyptian author, born in Alexandria, Egypt in 1948.

== life ==
Elsayed Hafez graduated from Alexandria University in 1976, in the departments of philosophy and sociology at the Faculty of Education. He was in charge of the culture department of Sout Al-Khaleej magazine in Kuwait in 1976. From 1974 to 1976, he worked as a theatre specialist in Alexandria. From 1978 to 1986, he worked for the National Council for Culture, Arts, and Literature as a journalist, researcher, secretary in editing the Alem Al-maarefah (World of Knowledge) series, chairman of the committee to encourage local literature, head of the school theatre and heritage seminar, secretary in Al-Arabi exhibition in Kuwait, secretary of World Culture magazine. He worked at Al-Seyassah newspaper in Kuwait from 1977 to 1987 in the culture section, arts section, every day's supplement, Meraat Almaraah Magazine, Alhadaf newspaper, investigation department, Arab affairs department, society page, editorial secretary. He was an animation development consultant at Skhar Foundation in 1994. From 2006 to 2007, he worked at the AlSada foundation in Dubai as the managing editor of Alshashah magazine, managing editor of Almughamer magazine, and a media consultant. He was an office manager at Afkar magazine in Cairo, the director of the Arab World Center for publishing and media for five years, he worked for a Kuwait politics newspaper for seven years, and was a consultant of programs development for Joint Program Production Institution in Kuwait, he was the first Arab whom the British Kingdom published seven English plays for, he is also the first Arab writer for whom the University of Arizona in the United States published five works in English and three in Arabic. He was a chief editor of Roya magazine, which is published in Egypt, he is the first Arabic writer to print his work for children and adults online. He has many publications, including (plays for adults- plays for children), also he directed many other plays. He formed many experimental theatre groups, he also has many TV and radio series. Hafez has many books and theatrical studies. His works was published in many Arabic magazines and newspapers, he participated in the International Festival of Cartage, Tunisia, Baghdad (Iraq), Jordan, Abu Dhabi, Cairo, Alexandria, Matrouh.

== Memberships ==
- Arab Writers' Union
- Egyptian Writers' Union
- Egyptian Representative Trade Union
- Egyptian Film Trades Union
- International PEN Egypt Club
- Honorary member of the American Theater Education Organization, University of Arizona, United States

== Works ==
=== Novels ===
- A Traveler Without Identity (Musafer bla haweyah) – 1993
- Nescafe – 2010: Alsayed Hafez says in this novel: "I love my country that I can hold every night in my lap as a rose, or a pillow, or a sentence in a phrase that I love as it is on the edge of the cemetery stained with blood and misery from thousands of years ago."
- Plain Coffee (Qahwa sada) – 2011: a narrative epic about fate, mystery, and adoration.
- Cappuccino – 2012
- Tea with Jasmine (Shai belyasmeen) – 2013
- Green Tea (Shai Akhdar) – 2014

=== Theatre ===
- The Pride of Nonsense in the Land of Meaningless (Kebriya altafaha fi belad allamaanah) – 1970
- The Dumb Drums in the Blue Medicine (Altubul alkharsaa fi aladweah alzarqaa) – 1971
- The Symphony of Love (Semfoniat alhob) (collection) – 1980
- Honey I Am Travelling (Habibati ana msafer) – 1979
- They Are What They Are, But They Are Not the Zaalik (Hom kma hom wa lakenahom lais hom alzaalik) – 1980
- The emergence and disappearance of Abu Dhar Al-Ghafari (Zuhour wa ekhtifaa Abu thar alghafari) – 1981
- My Beloved Princess of Cinema (Habibati Ameerat alcinema) – 1982
- The Tale of the Peasant Abdulmutee (Hekayat alfalah Abdulmutee) – 1982
- Time of the Word Lying/ Fear/ Death (Ya zaman alkalema alkatheb/ alkhouf/ almoot) – 1987
- 6 Men in Prison (Sitat rejal fi mutaqal) – 1989
- Symphony of Love (Semfoniat alhob) – 1991
- The Pride of Nonsense in the Land of Meaningless (Kebraa altafaha fi belad allamaanah) – 1991
- Sisyphus 20th Century (Sezef alqaren aleshreen) – 1991
- 9 Experimental Plays
- Trees Sometimes Bend (Alashjar tanhany ahyanan) – 1992
- Travels of Ibn Basboussa (Rehlat Ibn Basboussa) – 1994
- The King of Trash (Malek alzubalah) – 1995
- Rumor (Eshaah) (6 plays one chapter) – 1995
- Medal from the President (Wesam men alraees) – 1997
- Travelers Without Identity (Musaferoon bla haweyah) – 1997
- Abdullah (Alnadeem) – 1997
- Qaraqosh and Aragoz (Qaraqosh wa Aragoz) – 1998
- Mallow War (Hareb almloukheaah) – 2000
- The King of Trash (Malek alzubalah) – 2001
- Faces in the Lost Nights (Wejouh fi allayali alzaeeah) – 2003
- The Gypsy and the Tramp (Alghajaryah wa alsaalouk) – 2003
- Kidnapped Me, SOBs (Khatafoni welad alayh) – 2004
- Baby, Shell, and Rainbow (Tefel wa qawqaah wa qawzquzah) – 2004
- The Maid and the Old Woman (Alkhademah wa alajouz) – 2004
- Wanted Dead Or Alive (Matloub haian aw maietan) – 2004
- Two Women (Emraeatan) – 2004
- Peasant Abdulmutee (Alfalah Abdulmutee) and five other plays – 2004

=== Children's theatre ===
- Sandus – 1987
- Ali Baba – 1987
- Antar Ben Shadad – 1987
- Knights of Hilal Sons (Fursan bani Hilal) – 1987
- Abu Zaid Alhilali – 1995
- Happiness Shirt (Qamees alsaadah) – 1995
- Juha Sons (Awlad Juha) – 1996
- Cinderella – 1996
- Dewdrops (Qeter alnada) – 1996
- Roman's Love (Hob Al-Roman) – 1996
- The Wondrous Monster (Alwahesh Alajeeb) – 1996
- Cinderella and the Prince (Cinderella wa alameer) – 1996
- Nanoosa and Uncle Kamal (Nanoosa we alam Kamal) – 1996
- Hamdan and Meshmesha (Hamdan wa meshmesha) – 1996
- Koki Loves the Moon (Koki tuheb alqamar) – 2003
- Sandus – 2004

== Awards ==
- First prize in Theater Writing in Egypt, 1970.
- Award for Best Author of Children's Theater in Kuwait for Cinderella in 1980.
