= Alaa Aljaber =

Kuwaiti writer

Alaa Aljaber is a Kuwaiti writer, playwright, and novelist, known in academic and cultural fields for his interest in children's literature.

== Career ==
Aljaber was a researcher in the National Council for Culture, Arts and Literature from 1987 to 1990. He has written newspaper articles for Gulf and Arab and Habaibna, and supervised the cultural section of the Al-Watan newspaper in Kuwait from 1988 to 2002. He has lectured in various universities, faculties and schools in Kuwait and the Arab world about culture, criticism and writing.

Aljaber's writings have been analyzed and mentioned in studies and academic research. His books have been incorporated into university curricula in various disciplines, including children's literature and prose. These include his 1986 book Fe smaa al Kuwait (In the Sky of Kuwait) at Kuwait University from 1987 to 1989, and his novel Netherlands doesn't rain dates (Hollanda la tomtr rotaban) in the faculty of Arts and Education of Helwan University - Egypt in 2013. His play Conan in the Land of Pokémon was adapted into a drama course at the Higher Institute of Theatrical Arts in 2001. His TV scripts were presented as a model in Mass Media postgraduates' thesis at Bahrain University. The researcher Abd El Rahman Salah Eldin used Netherlands doesn't rain dates as an applied model in a master's thesis titled "The other in the Arabic novel-selected models" in 2015. The book was also discussed in the English literature master's thesis about Orientalism by the researcher Sarah Ashknaky from Kuwait University in 2015.

Aljaber's plays have been performed at the Higher Institute of Theatrical Arts, Arts Academy; the Institute of Arab Music Arts Academy; Faculty of Arts, Helwan University; and the Higher Institute of Theatrical Arts in Kuwait.

Sayed Ali Ismael wrote a critical review about Aljabir's book My plays as I see them now at the University of Aleppo, Syria 2011.

== Awards ==
- 2012 - Nady el qesa prize in Kuwait for the novel Netherlands doesn't rain wet
- 2012 - Television and Radio Festival in Tunisia – second place for the musical program Let's play (hya nlab)
- 2012 - Gulf Festival for Radio and Television in Bahrain for the musical program Let's play (hya nlab)
- 2010 - Festival for Arab Mass Media in Jordan – silver medal for the song Sounds have heaven
- 2002, 2008, 2009 - TV and Radio Festival in Cairo – gold medal for (Children's TV-Kuwait)
- 2003 - TV and Radio Festival gold medal for writing the children's series Diaries of an angry child
- 1999, 2000 - award for writing the best article about intellectual rights in Kuwait
