= Roula Hamadeh =

Lebanese actress

Roula Hamadeh (Arabic: رلى حمادة; born 31 March 1961) is a prolific Lebanese actress who achieved fame during the 1980s. She portrayed the iconic Jamale Salem in Shukri Anis Fakhoury's Al-`assifa series.
