= Alwasat (Kuwaiti newspaper) =

Coordinates: 29°21′26″N 47°54′24″E

Alwasat الوسط
- Type: Daily newspaper
- Editor-in-chief: Adnan Al Wazzan
- Language: Arabic
- Headquarters: Al Shuwaikh, Al Asimah
- Country: Kuwait
- Website: www.alwasat.com.kw

Alwasat (Arabic: الوسط, lit. 'The Domain') is an Arabic-language Kuwaiti daily newspaper owned by the Alwazzan family .

== See also ==
- List of newspapers in Kuwait
