= Assawt =

Arabic-language newspaper based in Kuwait

Assawt الصوت
- Type: Daily newspaper
- Founded: 21 October 2008
- Ceased publication: January 2009
- Language: Arabic
- Country: Kuwait

Assawt (in Arabic الصوت meaning The Voice in English), also known as Al Sawt, was an Arabic-language newspaper based in Kuwait.

== History ==
Assawt was established in 2008 and its first issue appeared on 21 October 2008. It became the fifteenth daily in the country. Youssef Al Someit, former information minister of Kuwait, headed the daily.

However, Assawt was disestablished in January 2009 due to economic reasons.

== See also ==
List of newspapers in Kuwait
