= 1985 Kuwait City bombings =

1985 terrorist attack

- Location: Kuwait City, Kuwait
- Date: 11 July 1985
- Attack type: Bombings
- Deaths: 11
- Injuries: 89
- Perpetrators: Abu Nidal Organization and Islamic Jihad Organization

On 11 July 1985, two bombs exploded in two cafés in Kuwait City, Kuwait, killing 11 people and wounding 89 others. A group affiliated with the Palestinian Abu Nidal Organization claimed responsibility for the attack, along with the Hezbollah-affiliated Islamic Jihad Organization.

== Attack ==
The first bombing took place at the Al Sharq, a seaside café, as families gathered on the eve of a Muslim holy day, and the second explosion occurred in the densely populated Salmiyeh district. A third bomb was found and detonated by Kuwaiti security forces in another café.

An emergency cabinet session of the Kuwaiti government was called under the Foreign Minister, Sheik Sabah Al-Ahmad Al-Jaber Al-Sabah, the acting Prime Minister at the time. Authorities closed the Kuwait International Airport to outgoing flights in response "as a precaution."

Several motives were considered for the attacks in the press, notably including foreign policy linked to Iran and Syria. The attacks were the latest in a series of terrorist attacks in Kuwait following the 1983 Kuwait bombings thought to be linked to Iran, including the hijacking of Kuwait Airways Flight 221 and the attempted assassinations of newspaper editor Ahmed Al-Jarallah and Kuwaiti ruler Jaber Al-Ahmad Al-Sabah. The cafés were also targeted as "wounds in the heart of Islam" by the terrorists for allowing men and women to eat together.

In January 1987, two men were sentenced to death for the attacks, a third to life imprisonment, and a fourth to a three-year prison term.

== See also ==
- 1983–1988 Kuwait terror attacks
