= List of USAID personnel who died while serving abroad =

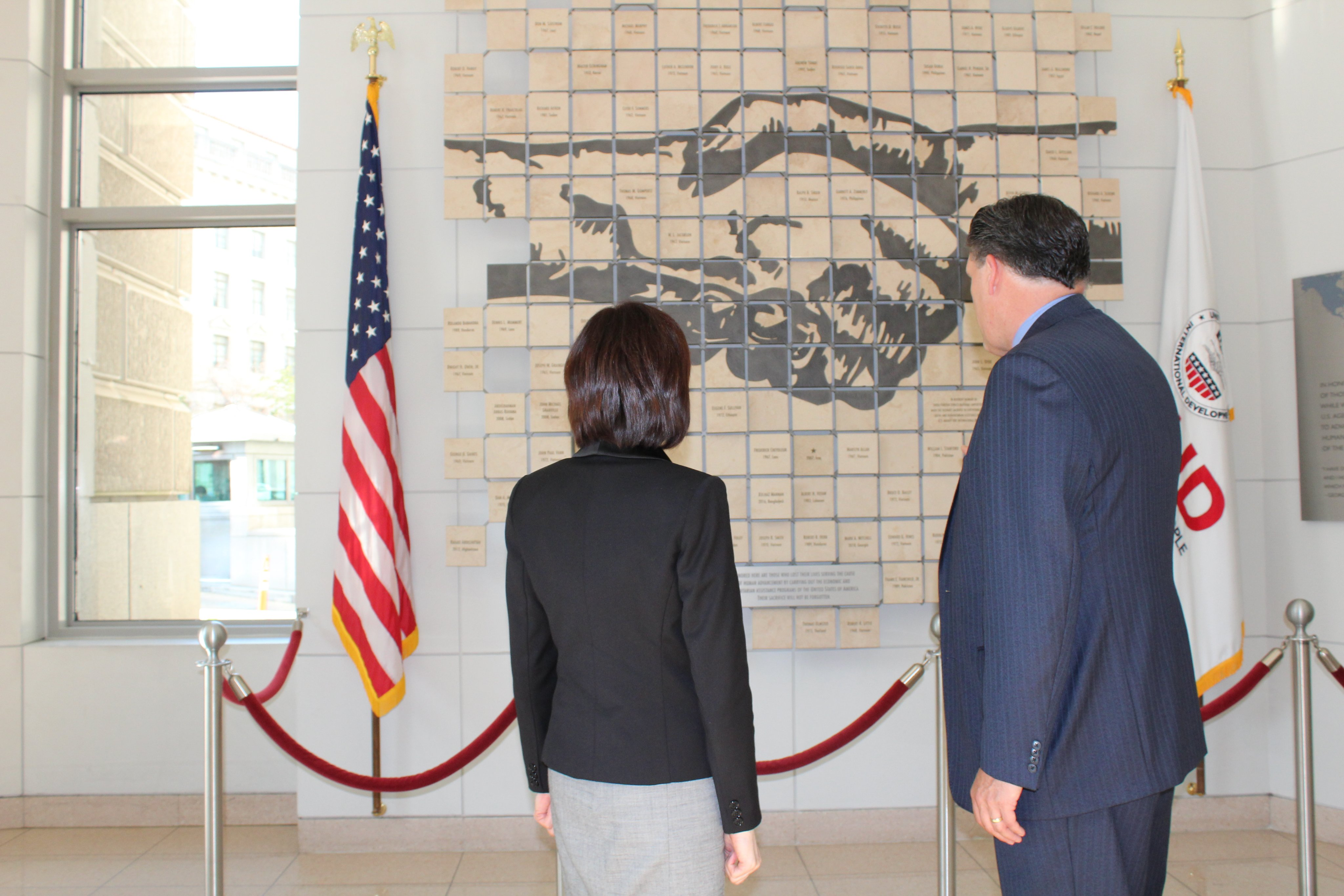
The "Memorial Wall" honors as "fallen national heroes" 99 nominated USAID officers killed in the line of duty. It was previously located in the lobby of the Ronald Reagan Building, and was reportedly removed by DOGE employees and subsequently misplaced.

Over 100 personnel and contractors of the United States Agency for International Development (USAID) are listed as having died while serving abroad, with the majority of incidents occurring during the Vietnam War - where over 50 USAID personnel died in Laos, Thailand, and Vietnam. Causes of death include assassinations, bombings, ambushes, accidents, and suicides.

The roles of those killed vary widely — public safety advisors working under the Office of Public Safety (OPS), agricultural experts, and health officers among them. The OPS has been quantitatively classified as the most dangerous occupation within USAID: the task of a "Public Safety Advisor" was to train police forces around the world, because at the time, security was considered part of the trivariate of D's: "Diplomacy, Development, and Defense." The majority of these public safety officers were former high-ranking police officers in the United States. The Office of Public Safety was shuttered in 1973 after much controversy.

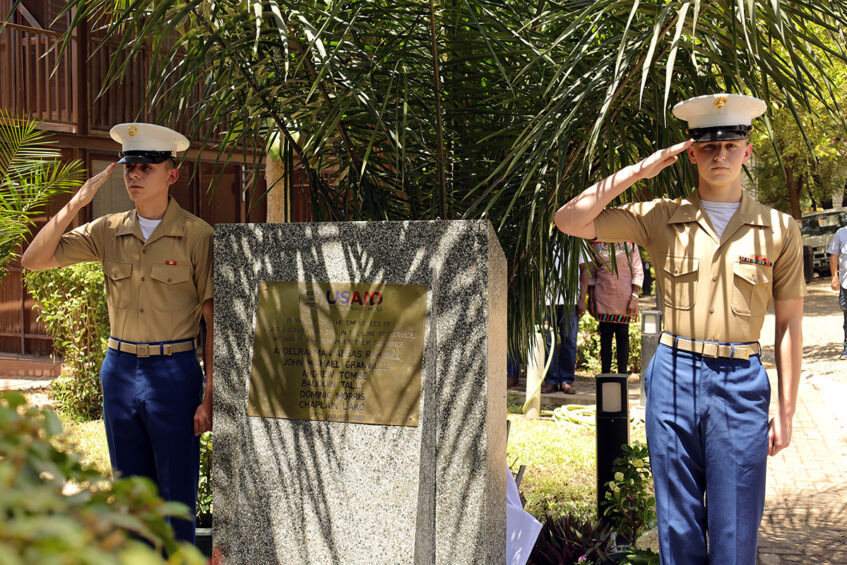
Two MCJROTC Cadets salute a memorial to USAID officers killed in Sudan. Several executed by a military tribunal, two killed in a drive-by-shooting, one killed in a traffic collision.

Several USAID personnel died in POW and concentration camps, such as Gustav Crane Hertz, and Thomas W. Ragsdale. Joseph W. Grainger was kept in a cave for five months, managed to escape, was captured a week later and was summarily executed.

Two pilots for Air America, John L. Oyer and Justin B. Mahoney, are listed as having been contracted by USAID while transporting a passenger whose name is still redacted by the CIA. However, Jack J. Wells, a public safety advisor, was also noted as having been on board the aircraft being piloted by Oyer and Mahoney when it was shot down. Air America was often used to transport building materials, food, medical aid and equipment, and many other supplies needed for development operations in Southeast Asia. Many pilots and aircraft owned by Air America were permanently assigned to USAID. Air America was also used for refugee resettlements, especially the evacuation of Hmong people from dangerous areas.

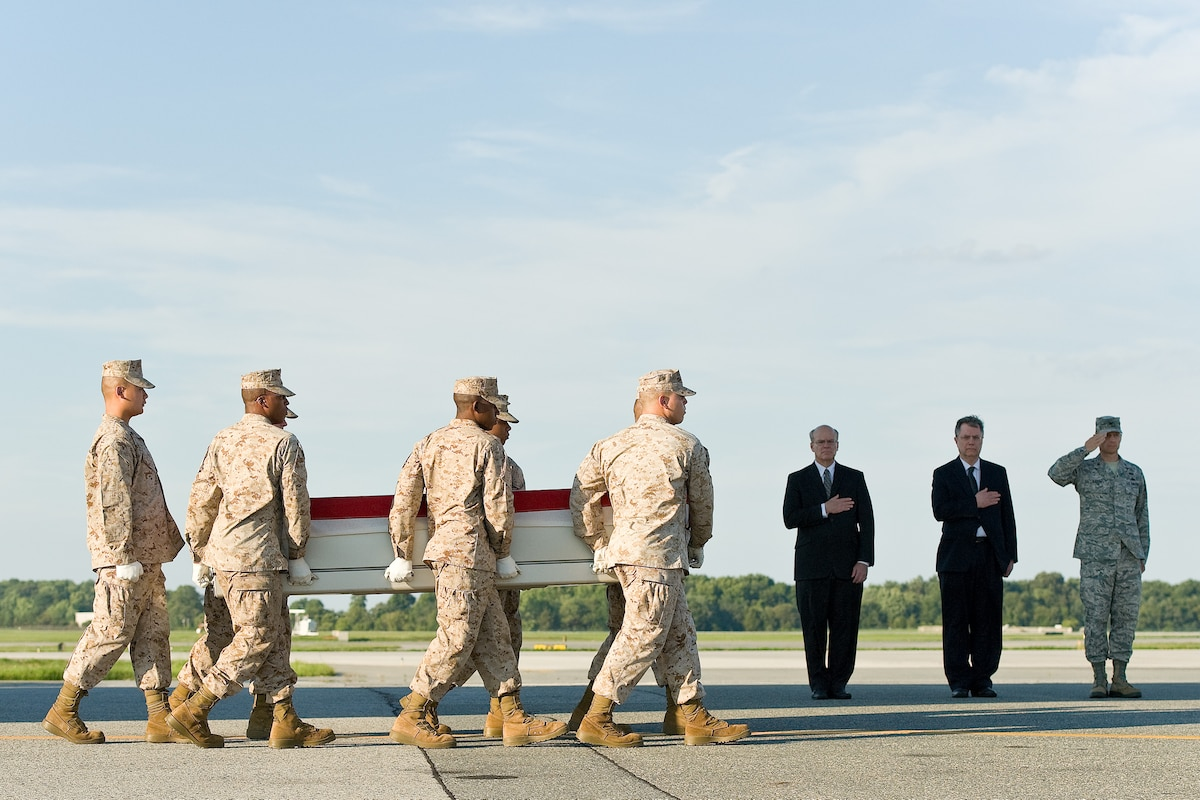
Ragei Abdelfattah seen here returning to the United States on August 12, 2012.

Not all USAID personnel killed were Americans. Rodrigo Santa Anna, for example, was a Filipino tasked with teaching English as a second language in a rural village in South Vietnam, where he was teaching a class of approximately 35. Members of the Viet Cong launched a Blitzkrieg-style attack on the village, and Santa Anna was captured. He is reported as having shouted "I'm not an American!" before being shot in the head.

In contrast, only one USAID person, Ragei Said Abdelfattah, is currently listed as having been killed in Afghanistan. Similarly, only one USAID employee, Stephen Scott Everhart, is currently listed as having been killed in Iraq.

Another fallen USAID employee, Nancy Ferebee Lewis, died after exposure to a toxic pesticide that was not approved for use in a domestic environment was sprayed in her embassy-owned apartment, launching an entire movement within the federal government to more closely monitor the dangers of pesticides used in domestic environments.

The company Louis Berger Group, contracting for USAID in Afghanistan, lost over 200 personnel in Afghanistan prior to the year 2010.

== List ==
USAID fallen officers
| Image | Name | Job title | Place of death | Cause of death | Date of death | Ref. |
1950
| | Walter Stanley Eltringham | Coal Mining Engineer assigned to the Coal Mining Section of the Economic Cooperation Administration, tasked with increasing coal production on the Korean Peninsula | Ba Chang Ri, North Korea | Died of overexposure in a concentration camp after a week of forced march by his captors. When he realized that he might be dying, he began donating his food to others and staying longer on fire watch duty so that others could sleep. He became so weak that others had to carry him, until he died to pneumonia. | November 17, 1950 | |
1953
| | Ralph Brownlee Swain | Entomologist assigned to the Point IV Program in Nicaragua | South of Mexico City, Mexico | Shot and killed by highwaymen after refusing to pay. His wife and children were in the vehicle and were also killed. | October 2, 1953 | |
1955
| | Everette Dixie Reese | Director, USAID photo service | Binh Xuyen, Vietnam | Plane shot down while taking photographs | April 29, 1955 | |
| | Anita Huovar Carroll | Top-Level AID diplomat | Sistan and Baluchestan, Iran | They were on the way to inspect a refugee camp on the road to Chahbahar, when they were ambushed by an 18-man posse, the "Dadshah gang," run by a notorious gangster and revolutionary fighter named Dadshah who belonged to the Sistan and Baluchestan insurgency. The party exhausted all of the ammunition in their own weapons before they were killed. Their bodies were found dead in the desert near the road. The Iranian government suspected that the gang wanted to sell Anita into slavery. Dadshah's younger brother, Ahmed Shah, admitted the group had committed the killings. | March 24, 1957 | |
| | Kevin Mario Carroll | Foreign Service Officer, Director of the Point IV Program in Iran | Sistan and Baluchestan, Iran | | March 24, 1957 | |
| | Brewster Anderson Wilson | Development Specialist for the Near East Foundation and AID Officer | Sistan and Baluchestan, Iran | | March 24, 1957 | |
| | Mohsen Shams | Iranian Deputy Assistant to Brewster Wilson | Sistan and Baluchestan, Iran | | March 24, 1957 | |
| | Herand Khachikian | Iranian driver and deputy assistant AID officer | Sistan and Baluchestan, Iran | | March 24, 1957 | |
1960
| | Dolph Brabham Owens | Public Safety Advisor for the MSUG, assigned to train South Vietnamese police forces | Saigon, South Vietnam | Ambushed by Viet Cong machine-gunner | November 5, 1960 | |
1962
| | Clyde Franklin Summers | Civil engineer for E.V. Lane Corporation, overseeing airport construction project | Saigon, South Vietnam | Ambushed by Viet Cong. A man without a uniform held his hand up, motioning for Clyde's vehicle to stop. Clyde told his driver to keep going, and the soldiers opened fire. | January 7, 1962 | |
| | Sydney B. Jacques | Program Inspector in the Office of Inspector General (OIG) for USAID | Nepal | Killed when a flight from Kathmandu to New Delhi crashed near Tulachan Duri, Nepal. | August 1, 1962 | |
| | Oscar Curtis Holder | Program Inspector in the Office of Inspector General (OIG) for USAID | Nepal | Killed when a flight from Kathmandu to New Delhi crashed near Tulachan Duri, Nepal. | August 1, 1962 | |
| | Unknown | Contractor assigned to USAID Public Safety Department | Vietnam | | ? | |
1964
| | John Alfred Nuhn | Deputy assistant director for finance for USAID in Bangkok | Bangkok, Thailand | Died due to injuries sustained in a car collision in Bangkok, Thailand | October 23, 1964 | |
| | W.L. Jacobsen | | Vietnam | | ? | |
1965
| | Gustav Crane Hertz | Chief Public Administrator for USAID mission in Vietnam | Vietnam | Disappeared on the afternoon of February 2, 1962. His death was publicly announced as an execution by the Viet Cong in June 1967, however his actual cause of death was malaria. | After February 2, 1965 | |
| | Joseph W. Grainger | Agricultural specialist | Vietnam | Kidnapped en route to a sugar cane agricultural experimental station in August 1964. Kept chained up in a cave for five months. Escaped from a POW Camp in 1965. Found and executed a week later. | March 17, 1965 | |
| | John B. Cone | Irrigation and sewage specialist, working for Hydrotechnic Corporation, a contracting company installing sewage systems in Vietnam | Saigon, South Vietnam | Ambushed at roadblock by Viet Cong soldiers dressed in the uniform of the South Vietnamese military | April 19, 1965 | |
| | Rodrigo Santa Anna | Teacher of English as a Second Language, Philippine national originally from Manilla | Phước Long province, South Vietnam | Shot during hostile fire during a blitzkrieg-style Viet Cong attack on the village he was living in | May 11, 1965 | |
| | Jack Edwin Ryan | Director of the USAID Department of Public Safety in Saigon, responsible for all US-Sponsored Police Officer training programs in Vietnam | Saigon, South Vietnam | Murdered in triple homicide by an Advisor under his command, at the center of many CIA conspiracy theories about General Westmoreland. While there has never been any direct evidence that Ryan was ever employed by the CIA, some historians suggest that he was a CIA officer under the official cover of the USAID. | July 23, 1965 | |
| | Jerry Allen Rose | Specialist on Contract for USAID | Vietnam | Plane sabotaged, crashed | September 15, 1965 | |
| | Justin Gerard Mahoney | FSO and Air America pilot transporting [classified] passenger | Bau Trai Air Strip, South Vietnam | Charter plane shot down by small arms fire while attempting to land C-45 flight #W9574Z | September 27, 1965 | |
| | John Lerdo "Jack" Oyer | FSO and Air America pilot transporting [classified] passenger | Bau Trai Air Strip, South Vietnam | Charter plane shot down by small arms fire while attempting to land C-45 flight #W9574Z | September 27, 1965 | |
| | Jack J. Wells | Public Safety Advisor, assigned to training South Vietnamese police forces | Bau Trai Air Strip, South Vietnam | Charter plane shot down by small arms fire while attempting to land C-45 flight #W9574Z | September 27, 1965 | |
| | Peter Morse Hunting | Assigned to International Voluntary Services and USAID | Vietnam | Ambushed by Viet Cong. Body recovered in 1973. | November 12, 1965 | |
1966
| | William D. Smith III | Flight Control Officer | Vietnam | Mid-air collision with helicopter after participating in airstrike | July 23, 1966 | |
| | Norman Lewis Clowers | Public Safety Advisor, assigned to train South Vietnamese police forces | Nha Trang, South Vietnam | Ambushed at roadblock by Viet Cong while driving alone after delivering a jeep load of timber and concrete to a house in South Vietnam | July, 1966 | |
1967
| | Don Myron Sjostrom | Refugee Operations Officer transferred from the Peace Corps | Na Khang, Laos | Shot and killed while escorting refugees to safety | January 6, 1967 | |
| | Robert LaFollette | Higher Education Advisor, Saigon Office | Vietnam | Plane crashed into mountain during storm, no survivors | March 21, 1967 | |
| | Frederick Dudley "Rick" Cheydleur | FSO assigned to International Voluntary Services as a village development worker responsible for rice and seed production | Phakkania, Savannakhet Province, Laos | Killed when Pathet Lao soldiers machine-gunned him while he slept in his quarters. He was a lifelong Quaker who had joined IVS to avoid fighting in Vietnam. | March 25, 1967 | |
| | Robert Kenneth Franzblau | Foreign Service Officer | Vietnam | Shot while evacuating refugees | June 7, 1967 | |
| | James Alexander Wallwork | Accountant at the US Embassy in Cairo | Alexandria, Egypt | Contracted peritonitis after being evacuated with his family from the Embassy in Cairo, died in the hospital in Alexandria | June 13, 1967 | |
| | Francis J. Savage | Provincial Representative | Hue City, Vietnam | Survivor of the 1965 Saigon bombing, died two years later from complications related to wounds sustained in the explosion | July 13, 1967 | |
| | Marilyn Lourdes Allan | Hospital nurse assigned to United States Public Health Service contracting with USAID | Nha Trang, South Vietnam | Murdered by her boyfriend, U.S. Army Captain Larry Peters after a sexual attack, who committed suicide after the shooting. She is memorialized on the Vietnam Veterans memorial at the New York State Capitol, under the designation: "Also". | August 16, 1967 | |
| | Dwight Hall Owen Jr. | Assistant to the USAID Provincial Representative for Community Development | Thanh Liêm, South Vietnam | Died from small arms fire trying to save a Revolutionary Vietnamese development chief from an ambush | August 30, 1967 | |
| | Kenneth Lyons "Ken" Cox | Public Safety Advisor, training South Vietnamese police officers | Saigon, South Vietnam | Suicide by gunshot | September 6, 1967 | |
| | Donald Vern Freeman | US Army Captain on loan to USAID | Vietnam | Shot during Hostile Fire | October 3, 1967 | |
| | Carroll Hugh Pender Sr. | Hospital Administration Specialist, retired US Army CSM | Vietnam | Killed by landmine while working on a hospital detail. | December 27, 1967 | |
| | NAME NOT GIVEN | Public Safety Advisor | Vietnam | Suicide | ? | |
1968
| | Frederick John Abramson | Deputy Province Advisor | Vinh Long, South Vietnam | Shot during Viet Cong Ambush | January 6, 1968 | |
| | David Lane Gitelson | Foreign Service Officer, assigned to International Voluntary Services | Hue Doc, Angiang, Mekong River Delta, South Vietnam | Captured and shot by Viet Cong | January 26, 1968 | |
| | Kermit Joseph Krause | Assistant Supply Advisor | Hue City, South Vietnam | Killed in the Tet Offensive | January 30, 1968 | |
| | John Thomas McCarthy | Public Safety Officer | Nha Trang, Vietnam | Killed in the Tet Offensive | January 30, 1968 | |
| | Thomas M. Gompertz | Foreign Service officer and Assistant USAID Representative | Hue City, South Vietnam | Shot and killed during the Tet Offensive at the Massacre at Huế | January 31, 1968 | |
| | Jeffrey Steven Lundstedt | Foreign Service Officer | Hue City, South Vietnam | Shot and killed during the Tet Offensive at the Massacre at Huế | January 31, 1968 | |
| | Steven D. Miller | Foreign Service Officer assigned to the US Information Service | Hue City, South Vietnam | Shot and killed during the Tet Offensive at the Massacre at Huế | January 31, 1968 | |
| | Robert Walker Hubbard | Civilian Advisor, former Marine Corps Captain | Hue City, South Vietnam | Shot and killed making possible the safe escape of his companions during a Viet Cong attack on Hue City while returning fire on the enemy | February 4, 1968 | |
| | Robert Roy Little | Foreign Service Officer at U.S. Embassy in Saigon, assigned to CORDS | Saigon, South Vietnam | Captured by a North Vietnamese team and summarily executed | February 7, 1968 | |
| | Hugh Ingram Calkins Lobit | Foreign Service Officer, transferred from INR Economic Section | Vĩnh Long, South Vietnam | Shot and killed by sniper while escorting U.S. News correspondent | February 9, 1968, | |
| | Albert Alexander Farkas | Public Safety Advisor, assigned to train South Vietnamese police forces | Saigon, South Vietnam | Shot by sniper, died later in the hospital from a blood clot | February 14, 1968 | |
| | Robert Wilson Brown Jr. | US Marine Corps Captain on loan to USAID | South Vietnam | Shot by hostile fire | February 26, 1968 | |
| | Richard Andrew Schenk | Foreign Service Officer | Quang Ngai, South Vietnam | Killed in landmine explosion | March 2, 1968 | |
| | Michael Murphy | Public Safety Advisor, assigned to training South Vietnamese police forces | Vietnam | Ambushed by Viet Cong, killed by a missile | June 14, 1968 | |
| | Harold Ormal Sealock | Director of Education and Culture | Savannakhet, Laos | Killed in an Air America C46 plane crash while it was attempting takeoff. Several Air America employees were also killed. Between 20 and 40 people in total were killed. | November 25, 1968 | |
| | Donald Seiso Kobayashi | Water resources specialist with a degree in Agriculture | Savannakhet, Laos | Killed in an Air America C46 plane crash while it was attempting takeoff. Several Air America employees were also killed. Between 20 and 40 people in total were killed. | November 25, 1968 | |
| | Donald J Parenteau | Civilian US Navy employee assigned to USAID | Savannakhet, Laos | Killed in an Air America C46 plane crash while it was attempting takeoff. Several Air America employees were also killed. Between 20 and 40 people in total were killed. | November 25, 1968 | |
1969
| | George B. Gaines | Civilian Logistics Officer | Vietnam | Died from shrapnel and gunfire, found dead with bullet wounds in the back | February 23, 1969 | |
| | Chandler Edwards | Foreign Service Officer, assigned to International Voluntary Services | Ban Soukhouma,Champassak Province, Laos | Rocket attack | May 5, 1969 | |
| | Arthur Stillman | Foreign Service Officer, assigned to International Voluntary Services | Ban Thouei, Bolikhamsai province, Laos | Rocket attack | August 5, 1969 | |
| | Dennis L. Mummert | Foreign Service Officer, assigned to International Voluntary Services | Ban Thouei, Bolikhamsai province, Laos | Rocket attack | August 5, 1969 | |
| | Mary Breen Ratterman | Physician from the University of Louisville working on a contract for the American Medical Association and USAID | Saigon, South Vietnam | Died in a fall from a balcony | October 2, 1969 | |
| | Robert D. Handy | | Vietnam | Ambushed by Viet Cong | 1969 | |
| | Thomas W. Ragsdale | Civilian Agricultural Specialist, P.A.S.A. | Vietnam | Captured during the Tet Offensive, died of dysentery along the Ho Chi Minh trail in a POW camp, his body was later found in shallow grave | 1969 | |
| | David Bush | | Vietnam | | | |
1970
| | Dan A. Mitrione | Chief Public Safety Adviser at the American Embassy in Uruguay, trained locals in counterinsurgency tactics | Uruguay | Kidnapped, tortured, and killed by Tupamaros rebels after failure of Uruguayan government to meet demands | August 10, 1970 | |
| | Joseph B. Smith | Assistant Area Development Officer | Vietnam | Killed in landmine explosion | August 30, 1970 | |
| | James A. Hyde | | Vietnam | | | |
1972
| | Eugene F. Sullivan | Private Enterprise Officer | Asmara, Eritrea | Contracted malaria, died in the hospital | January 21, 1972 | |
| | John Paul Vann | Senior level USAID officer on loan to CORDS, the first U.S. civilian to command U.S. regular troops in combat | North Vietnam | Died in a helicopter crash | June 9, 1972 | |
| | Luther A. McLendon | US Marine Corps Captain on loan to USAID | Vietnam | Aboard a plane that exploded on the ground | December 1, 1972 | |
| | Bruce O. Bailey | Social Welfare Advisor | Kenya | Plane crash en route to a refugee camp | December 1, 1972 | |
| | Edward G. Hines | Foreign Service Officer | Vietnam | Plane crash | 1972 | |
| | Rudolph Kaiser | Senior USAID Advisor for Go Cong Province | Mekong Delta, Vietnam | Ambushed by Viet Cong | 1972 | |
| | Charles O'Brien | Director of USAID Department of Public Safety | Saigon, South Vietnam | Unknown "tragic death" during the closure of the department and the exfiltration of personnel | 1972 | |
1975
| | Thomas Olmsted | USAID Chief of Mission in Cambodia | Cambodia | Pancreatitis | February 12, 1975 | |
1976
| | Garnett Allan Simmerly | USAID Chief of Mission in the Philippines | Somewhere in the Philippines | Phil-Air plane "PIPER NAVAJO" vanished in a tropical storm, carrying American, Japanese, and German government officials en route to inspect the Bicol River basin project in Naga City. | September 13, 1976 | |
1981
| | Richard Aitken | Foreign Service Officer | Sudan | Automobile accident | 1981 | |
| | Thomas R. Blaka | | Lebanon | | | |
1983
| | William R. McIntyre | Deputy Director of Mission | Beirut, Lebanon | Killed in the explosion of the 1983 US embassy bombing in Beirut | April 18, 1983 | |
| | Albert N. Votaw | Public Housing Advisor | Beirut, Lebanon | Killed in the explosion of the 1983 US embassy bombing in Beirut | April 18, 1983 | |
1984
| | Charles Floyd Hegna | Program Inspector in the Office of Inspector General (OIG) for USAID | Mashhad, Iran | Killed by gunmen during the incidents of Kuwait Airways Flight 221, shot and body dumped on the tarmac | December, 1984 | |
| | William R. Stanford | Program Inspector in the Office of Inspector General (OIG) for USAID | Mashhad, Iran | Killed by gunmen during the incidents of Kuwait Airways Flight 221, shot and body dumped on the tarmac | December, 1984 | |
1987
| | Frank L. Fairchild Jr. | Education Program Development Officer for Pakistan | Mexico | Murdered by unknown assassin while on vacation to Central America, body found floating in the ocean | 1987 | |
1989
| | Gladys Gilbert | Special Projects Officer, Refugee Office | Gambela, Ethiopia | Died aboard a small twin-engine plane that slammed into a mountainside en route to an Ethiopian refugee camp | August 7, 1989 | |
| | Thomas Jeffrey Worrick | Deputy Director of Mission, established refugee program | Gambela, Ethiopia | Died aboard a small twin-engine plane that slammed into a mountainside en route to an Ethiopian refugee camp | August 7, 1989 | |
| | Roberta Radford Worrick | Emergency Food Program Monitor | Gambela, Ethiopia | Died aboard a small twin-engine plane that slammed into a mountainside en route to an Ethiopian refugee camp | August 7, 1989 | |
| | Debebe Agonafer | Agricultural Economist | Gambela, Ethiopia | Died aboard a small twin-engine plane that slammed into a mountainside en route to an Ethiopian refugee camp | August 7, 1989 | |
| | Robert B. Hebb | Program Inspector in the Office of Inspector General (OIG) for USAID | Cerro de Hula, Honduras | Died in the plane crash of TAN-SAHSA Flight 414 | October 22, 1989 | |
| | Rolando Barahona | Program Inspector in the Office of Inspector General (OIG) for USAID | Honduras | | 1989 | |
1990
| | Richard Finely | Acting USAID Comptroller | Baguio, Philippines | Died when the roof of the Nevada Hotel collapsed in the 1990 Luzon earthquake | July 16, 1990 | |
| | Lisa Isidro | Foreign Service Officer | Baguio, Philippines | Died when the roof of the Nevada Hotel collapsed in the 1990 Luzon earthquake | July 16, 1990 | |
| | Lino De La Cruz | Foreign Service Officer | Baguio, Philippines | Died when the roof of the Nevada Hotel collapsed in the 1990 Luzon earthquake | July 16, 1990 | |
| | Ed Plata | Foreign Service Officer | Baguio, Philippines | Died when the roof of the Nevada Hotel collapsed in the 1990 Luzon earthquake | July 16, 1990 | |
| | Susan Doria | Foreign Service Officer | Baguio, Philippines | Died when the roof of the Nevada Hotel collapsed in the 1990 Luzon earthquake | July 16, 1990 | |
1992
| | Dominic Morris | Foreign Service Officer | Juba, Sudan | Executed by a military tribunal during the Second Sudanese Civil War | September 1992 | |
| | Baudoin Tally | Foreign Service Officer | Juba, Sudan | Executed by a military tribunal during the Second Sudanese Civil War | September 1992 | |
| | Andrew Tombe | Foreign Service Officer | Juba, Sudan | Executed by a military tribunal during the Second Sudanese Civil War | September 1992 | |
| | Chaplain Lake | Foreign Service Officer | Juba, Sudan | Executed by a military tribunal during the Second Sudanese Civil War | September 1992 | |
1993
| | Nancy Ferebee Lewis | Executive Assistant | Cairo, Egypt | Died after her Embassy apartment was sprayed with a highly toxic pesticide not approved for residential use | December 25, 1993 | |
2002
| | Laurence M. Foley | Supervisory Executive Officer | Amman, Jordan | Killed by gunmen with terror connections outside his home | October 28, 2002 | |
2005
| | UNKNOWN | Afghan aid worker employed by Chemonics International | Helmand Province, Afghanistan | Ambushed and shot to death | May 18, 2005 | |
| | UNKNOWN | Afghan aid worker employed by Chemonics International | Helmand Province, Afghanistan | Ambushed and shot to death | May 18, 2005 | |
| | UNKNOWN | Afghan aid worker employed by Chemonics International | Helmand Province, Afghanistan | Ambushed and shot to death | May 18, 2005 | |
| | UNKNOWN | Afghan aid worker employed by Chemonics International | Helmand Province, Afghanistan | Ambushed and shot to death | May 18, 2005 | |
| | UNKNOWN | Afghan aid worker employed by Chemonics International | Helmand Province, Afghanistan | Ambushed and shot to death | May 18, 2005 | |
| | UNKNOWN | Afghan aid worker employed by Chemonics International | Zabul Province, Afghanistan | Ambushed and shot while driving to Kabul with the body of one of five men killed in the previous attack | May 19, 2005 | |
| | UNKNOWN | Afghan aid worker employed by Chemonics International | Zabul Province, Afghanistan | Ambushed and shot while driving to Kabul with the body of one of five men killed in the previous attack | May 19, 2005 | |
| | UNKNOWN | Afghan aid worker employed by Chemonics International | Zabul Province, Afghanistan | Ambushed and shot while driving to Kabul with the body of one of five men killed in the previous attack | May 19, 2005 | |
| | UNKNOWN | Afghan aid worker employed by Chemonics International | Zabul Province, Afghanistan | Ambushed and shot while driving to Kabul with the body of one of five men killed in the previous attack | May 19, 2005 | |
| | UNKNOWN | Afghan aid worker employed by Chemonics International | Zabul Province, Afghanistan | Ambushed and shot while driving to Kabul with the body of one of five men killed in the previous attack | May 19, 2005 | |
| | UNKNOWN | Afghan aid worker employed by Chemonics International | Zabul Province, Afghanistan | Ambushed and shot while driving to Kabul with the body of one of five men killed in the previous attack | May 19, 2005 | |
2006
| | Margaret Ruth Alexander | Deputy Director for USAID in Nepal | Ghunsa, Taplejung, Nepal | Killed in the Shree Air Mil Mi-8 helicopter crash. 24 people were killed overall. This team was traveling to implement the transfer of the Kangchenjunga Conservation Area to the management of local indigenous groups. | September 23, 2006 | |
| | Bijnan Acharya | Program Development Specialist | Ghunsa, Taplejung, Nepal | Killed in the Shree Air Mil Mi-8 helicopter crash. 24 people were killed overall. This team was traveling to implement the transfer of the Kangchenjunga Conservation Area to the management of local indigenous groups. | September 23, 2006 | |
| | Matt Preece | Recently hired, transferred from WWF | Ghunsa, Taplejung, Nepal | Killed in the Shree Air Mil Mi-8 helicopter crash. 24 people were killed overall. This team was traveling to implement the transfer of the Kangchenjunga Conservation Area to the management of local indigenous groups. | September 23, 2006 | |
| | UNKNOWN | Afghan aid worker assigned to USAID | Daraeem district, Badakhshan province, Afghanistan | Killed by remote controlled improvised explosive device while crossing a bridge in the district | May 30, 2006 | |
| | UNKNOWN | Afghan aid worker assigned to USAID | Daraeem district, Badakhshan province, Afghanistan | Killed by remote controlled improvised explosive device while crossing a bridge in the district | May 30, 2006 | |
| | UNKNOWN | Afghan aid worker assigned to USAID | Daraeem district, Badakhshan province, Afghanistan | Killed by remote controlled improvised explosive device while crossing a bridge in the district | May 30, 2006 | |
2008
| | John Michael Granville | Senior Level Diplomat | Khartoum, Sudan | Assassinated in a drive-by shooting while driving home from a New Year's party at the British Embassy | January 1, 2008 | |
| | Abdel Rahman Abbas | Original member of the Disaster Assistance Response Team (DART) for Darfur | Khartoum, Sudan | Assassinated in a drive-by shooting while driving home from a New Year's party at the British Embassy | January 1, 2008 | |
2010
| | Dale J. Gredler | Financial Management Specialist and NEP Contract Officer | Over the Atlantic Ocean | Died of heart attack while on transatlantic flight | January 27, 2010 | |
| | Hosai | Afghan aid worker for DAI Global contracting for USAID | Kandahar, Afghanistan | Killed while catching a motorized rickshaw by armed men on a motorcycle | April 13, 2010 | |
| | UNKNOWN | Contractor | Kandahar, Afghanistan | Killed in a suicide bomber vehicle detonation attack on USAID compound | April 15, 2010 | |
| | UNKNOWN | Contractor | Kandahar, Afghanistan | Killed in a suicide bomber vehicle detonation attack on USAID compound | April 15, 2010 | |
| | UNKNOWN | Contractor | Kandahar, Afghanistan | Killed in a suicide bomber vehicle detonation attack on USAID compound | April 15, 2010 | |
| | UNKNOWN | Contractor | Kandahar, Afghanistan | Killed in a suicide bomber vehicle detonation attack on USAID compound | April 15, 2010 | |
| | UNKNOWN | Contractor | Kandahar, Afghanistan | Killed in a suicide bomber vehicle detonation attack on USAID compound | April 15, 2010 | |
| | Rouven Beinecke | Security specialist for Edinburgh International, a contracting company for DAI Global, on contract for USAID | Kunduz province, Afghanistan | Taliban attack on USAID compound | July 2, 2010 | |
| | Shaun Sexton | Security specialist for Edinburgh International, a contracting company for DAI Global, on contract for USAID | Kunduz province, Afghanistan | Taliban attack on USAID compound | July 2, 2010 | |
| | NAME NOT GIVEN | Security specialist for Edinburgh International, a contracting company for DAI Global, on contract for USAID | Kunduz province, Afghanistan | Taliban attack on USAID compound | July 2, 2010 | |
| | Linda Norgrove | Aid worker for DAI Global on contract for USAID | Dewagal valley, Kunar Province, Afghanistan | Killed by her captors while special operations forces attempted a rescue | October 8, 2010 | |
2011
| | Stephen Scott Everhart | Professor and associate dean in the School of Business at The American University in Cairo on consultation for USAID at University of Baghdad | Baghdad, Iraq | Killed in an attack on an American convoy before a series of explosions were set off around the city | June 23, 2011 | |
2012
| | Ragei Said Abdelfattah | Foreign Service Officer | Eastern Konar Province, Afghanistan | Victim of a suicide bombing | August 8, 2012 | |
2013
| | Antoinette Beaumont Tomasek | Community Health Specialist, focusing on water, sanitation and education | Port-au-Prince, Haiti | Traffic collision | June 26, 2013 | |
| | Michael Cameron Dempsey | Head of the provincial reconstruction team in Nangarhar | Afghanistan | Committed suicide by hanging himself in a hotel-room shower | August 11, 2013 | |
2016
| | Xulhaz Mannan | Well-known gay rights activist who worked for the Office of Democracy and Governance at the Bangladesh Mission | Dhaka, Bangladesh | Hacked to death alongside another gay rights activist named Tanay Majumder in his own apartment by Islamic fundamentalist extremists who gained entry by posing as couriers | April 25, 2016 | |
2018
| | Mark A. Mitchell | Foreign Service Officer | Georgia | Traffic collision with hit-and-run driver | May 6, 2018 | |
2021
| | Tresja Denysenko | Disaster Assistance Response Team (DART) responding to the Haiti earthquake | Miami, Florida | Collapsed suddenly on deployment to Haiti, rushed to Florida where she died in the hospital | August 19, 2021 | |
2023
| | Hani Jnena | Contracting AID worker | Gaza City, Gaza Strip, Palestine | Killed in an Israeli airstrike alongside his wife and two children | November 25, 2023 | |
2024
| | Jacob Toukhy (Yakov Touhi) | Paramedic and senior embassy aide | Jaffa, Israel | Shot during a traffic dispute by an off-duty Israeli police officer | April 12, 2024 | |
