= Al-Sabah (newspaper) =

Al-Sabah الصباح
- Type: Daily newspaper
- Format: Print, online
- Owner(s): Barakat Al Hedaiban
- Editor: Barakat Al Hedaiban
- Founded: 2007
- Language: Arabic
- Headquarters: Al Jahra
- Website: alsabahpress.com

Al-Sabah (Arabic: الصباح, lit. 'The Morning') is a daily newspaper published in Kuwait. It also owns a TV channel.

In 2025, Government of Kuwait revoked the licenses of paper and its affiliated TV station after stripping owner Barakat Hudaiban Al Rashidi of citizenship.

== See also ==
- List of newspapers in Kuwait
