= Arrouiah =

Kuwaiti Arabic-language newspaper published from 2008 to 2010

- Type: Daily newspaper
- Owner: Al Imtiaz Investment
- Editor-in-chief: Saud Al Sebeiei
- Staff writers: around 120
- Founded: February 2008
- Ceased publication: 29 July 2010
- Language: Arabic
- Headquarters: Kuwait City

Arrouiah was an Arabic language newspaper based in Kuwait City, Kuwait. The daily was briefly published between 2008 and 2010.

== History ==
Arrouiah was established in February 2008, being the 12th daily in the country. It was a political daily, focusing on Kuwaiti events. Saud Al Sebeiei served as the editor-in-chief of the daily. The chairman of the board was Shireeda Abdullah Al Mousherji, and its general manager was Mubarak Mazyad Al Mousherji.

Its publication was ceased on 29 July 2010 due to financial difficulties.

== See also ==
List of newspapers in Kuwait
