= Al-Seyassah =

Kuwaiti daily newspaper

Al-Seyassah السياسة
- Type: Daily newspaper
- Owner: Ahmed Al-Jarallah
- Founder(s): Abdulaziz F. Al-Masaeed; Ahmed Al-Jarallah
- Publisher: Dar Al Seyassah Company for Printing, Publishing and Distribution WLL
- Editor-in-chief: Ahmed Al Jarallah
- Founded: 3 June 1965; 61 years ago
- Language: Arabic
- Country: Kuwait
- Sister newspapers: Arab Times; AlHadaf Magazine; Hadafnet
- OCLC number: 54902195
- Website: alseyassah.com

Al-Seyassah (Arabic: السياسة, romanized: as-Siyāsa, lit. 'Politics') is a Kuwaiti daily newspaper published by Dar Al-Seyassah Press Publishing Printing and Distribution Co. The editor-in-chief of the newspaper is Ahmed Al-Jarallah.

== History ==
Al-Seyassah was launched on 3 June 1965 as a weekly magazine by Ahmed Al-Jarallah and owned by Abdulaziz F. Al-Masaeed. In 1968, Al-Jarallah bought Al-Seyassah from Al-Masaeed with a bank loan and, with assistance from a friend, who was a Kuwaiti minister of information, obtained the license to turn the weekly magazine into a daily newspaper format.

Naji al-Ali worked for the paper from 1968 to 1974. In 1977, Jarallah expanded Al-Seyassah into a media group, which also publishes the English-language Arab Times newspaper and the weekly magazine Al-Hadaf (Arabic: الهدف, lit. 'The Target') in partnership with Syrian businessman Mazen Al-Tarazi.

In 1977, the assets of Al-Seyassah were estimated at more than five million Kuwaiti dinars ($17.25m) in 1977 values, including a printing plant which was at the time the most modern in the region.

In 2003, the newspaper held the 4th circulation ranking in Kuwait, with an adult readership of 302,700, a daily circulation of 75,679 copies, and a market share of 16.82%.

== See also ==
- List of newspapers in Kuwait
