= Alam Al Yawm =

Kuwaiti daily newspaper (2007–2014)

- Type: Daily newspaper
- Owner: Ahmad Al Jabr Al Shemmeri
- Founder(s): Ahmad Al Daas; Ahmad Al Jabr Al Shemmeri
- Editor-in-chief: Ahmad Al Daas
- Founded: 8 January 2007
- Ceased publication: July 2014
- Political alignment: Moderate and independent
- Language: Arabic
- Circulation: 23,000 (2012)
- Website: Alam Al Yawm

Alam Al Yawm (Arabic: عالم اليوم; The World of Today) was a newspaper published in Kuwait. The paper had an independent and moderate stance and was in circulation between 2007 and 2014.

== History and profile ==
Alam Al Yawn was first published on 8 January 2007. The founders were two businessmen, Ahmad Al Daas and Ahmad Al Jabr Al Shemmeri. The former was also the editor-in-chief. Al Shemmeri was the owner of Alam Al Yawm.

In 2012 Alam Al Yawn sold 23,000 copies.

In April 2014, the paper and Al Watan were temporarily closed down for two weeks by the Kuwaiti government due to the publication of a videotape allegedly showing former senior officials plotting a coup in Kuwait. In June 2014, both papers were again shut down for five days because of the same reason.

In July 2014 the license of the paper was revoked by the Kuwaiti authorities, and the paper ceased publication. The Kuwaiti Ministry of Information cited the reason for closure as "losing some of the terms and conditions for obtaining a licence." The citizenships of the owner, Ahmad Al Jabr Al Shemmeri, and of his family members were also revoked by a decision of the Kuwaiti cabinet on 21 July 2014.

== Political stance and content ==
Alam Al Yawm was an independent and moderate paper. However, the paper was close to the Kuwaiti opposition group, Popular Bloc.

In November 2009, Mohammed Abdulqader Al Jassem published an article in the daily, criticizing the manipulation of the Kuwaiti newspapers by Prime Minister Nasser Al Mohammed Al Sabah. Upon this event both the writer and Alam Al Yawm were fined 3,000 Kuwaiti dinars on 7 March 2010.

== See also ==
- List of newspapers in Kuwait
