= Abdallah Kamal =

Egyptian journalist and politician

Abdallah Kamal (1965 – 13 June 2014) was an Egyptian journalist and politician.

== Biography ==
Kamal graduated from Cairo University, having studied in the faculty of mass communications. He became editor-in-chief of Rose al-Youssef, a weekly magazine owned by the Egyptian government, in July 2005. He served in the post until 2011.

Kamal was known as an opponent of the Muslim Brotherhood. He became an MP for the National Democratic Party in the Shura Council from 2007 to 2011. He founded his own news website, dotmasr.eg. He was also advisor to the Al Rai newspaper of Kuwait and a contributor to Al Arabiya.

He died of a heart attack aged 49 on 13 July 2014.
