= Annahar (Kuwait) =

Annahar النهار
- Type: Daily newspaper
- Owner(s): Dar Annahar for Press, Publishing and Distribution Company
- Editor-in-chief: Imad Bukhamseen
- Founded: 2 September 2007; 19 years ago
- Language: Arabic
- Headquarters: Kuwait City
- Circulation: 23,000 (2012)
- Website: Annahar

Annahar (Arabic: النهار, lit. 'The Morning') is an Arabic newspaper headquartered in Kuwait City, Kuwait.

== History and profile ==
Annahar was first published in Kuwait on 2 September 2007, being the ninth Arabic paper in the country. The owner of the daily is the Dar Annahar for Press, Publishing and Distribution company which is an affiliated body of the Bukhamseen Holding. On 2 September 2007 the daily also launched its website. Imad Bukhamseen is the editor-in-chief of Annahar which covers local and international political, art, culture and economic news. The daily is described as an independent political newspaper with a liberal leaning. The 2012 circulation of the daily was 23,000 copies.

In March 2010, the daily was fined 3.000 Kuwait dinars for publishing an article which was deemed by the authorities as offensive to the ruling family, Al Sabah.

== See also ==
- List of newspapers in Kuwait
