= Al-Watan Daily =

Al Watan Daily
- Type: Daily newspaper
- Founded: 3 March 2008
- Ceased publication: January 2013
- Language: English
- Headquarters: Kuwait City

Al Watan Daily was a daily English-language newspaper published in Kuwait.

== History and profile ==
The first issue of Al-Watan Daily was published on 3 March 2008. The paper was established and was printed by the Dar Al-Watan publishing house, which also publishes the Arabic language daily newspaper Al Watan. In 2006 Dar Al Watan had published the English language daily "The Daily Star – Kuwait edition" in cooperation with The Daily Star.

On 8 November 2009 Al-Watan Daily launched its Journalism and Media Club (JAM), which was aimed at introducing youth to the process of coordinating and publishing a newspaper. 16 students from local Kuwaiti schools were selected to participate in the initial five-week program, which concluded with the publication of the first JAM issue on 13 December 2009.

In January 2013 Al-Watan Daily announced that it "will temporary be off the market for approx. three months due to business development and restructuring".
