= 1981 Kuwaiti general election =

General elections were held in Kuwait on 23 February 1981. A total of 447 candidates contested the election, which saw pro-government candidates remain the largest bloc in Parliament. Voter turnout was 89.8%.

== Results ==
Party	Votes	%	Seats	+/–
Pro-government candidates			28	+7
Independents			8	+2
Sunni Islamist			7	+1
Shi'ite Islamist			4	–6
Secular opposition			3	–4
Total			50	0
Total votes	37,689	–		
Registered voters/turnout	41,953	89.84		
Source: Nohlen et al.
