= Awan (Kuwait) =

Awan أوان
- Type: Daily newspaper
- Editor-in-chief: Mohammad Al Rumihi
- Founded: 18 November 2007
- Ceased publication: May 2010
- Political alignment: Independent
- Language: Arabic
- Circulation: 15,000 (2008)

Awan (in Arabic أوان meaning Time) was an Arabic-language independent newspaper based in Kuwait. The daily was published from November 2007 to May 2010.

== History ==
Awan was launched on 18 November 2007, being the tenth daily in the country. Mohammad Al Rumihi served as the editor-in-chief of the paper. Awan had offices in Cairo and Beirut in addition to its native Kuwait.

The daily provided news about local politics, local and regional economy, local and international arts and culture as well as sports. It had a whole page for expatriates in the country under "Awan Communities." The 2008 circulation of the daily was 15,000 copies. Awan ceased publication in May 2010 due to economic reasons.

== See also ==
List of newspapers in Kuwait
