= 1990 Kuwaiti National Council election =

National Council elections were held in Kuwait on 10 June 1990. The Council (only half of which was elected) was created by the Emir to try to appease protestors. A total of 574 candidates contested the 50 seats, and although the opposition called for a boycott, the turnout was 62.3%. Abdulaziz F. Al-Masaeed was elected as Chairman of the Council.
