= Peninsula Lions =

The Peninsula Lions are an organization that staged several attacks in Kuwait in 2005.

Several of their members have been arrested by Kuwaiti security forces, Hamad Al Harbi, a fugitive sentenced in absentia to seven years in prison for his part in clashes between the Peninsula Lions and police in 2005, and Meshal Al Shimmari, sentenced in absentia to 10 years in jail for belonging to the al-Qaeda-linked group.

In 2005, Amer Khlaif Al Enezi, a preacher at a mosque in Jahra area, was arrested on 31 January and died in custody on 8 February due to "heart failure". He was an active member and supposedly leader of the Peninsula Lions. It was around this time that Kuwaiti security forces undertook raids against the Peninsula Lions, during which they discovered two explosives caches, the first containing raw materials and the second a bomb-making workshop with nine completed devices packed into bags and ready for delivery. The most recent raids resulted in intense fire fights in Kuwait City suburbs that left six militants, one police officer, and one Bahraini bystander dead. The linked raids appear to have killed the remaining two senior figures in the organization and yielded captives capable of revealing new intelligence.
