= Kuwait Airways Flight 221 =

1984 flight hijacking

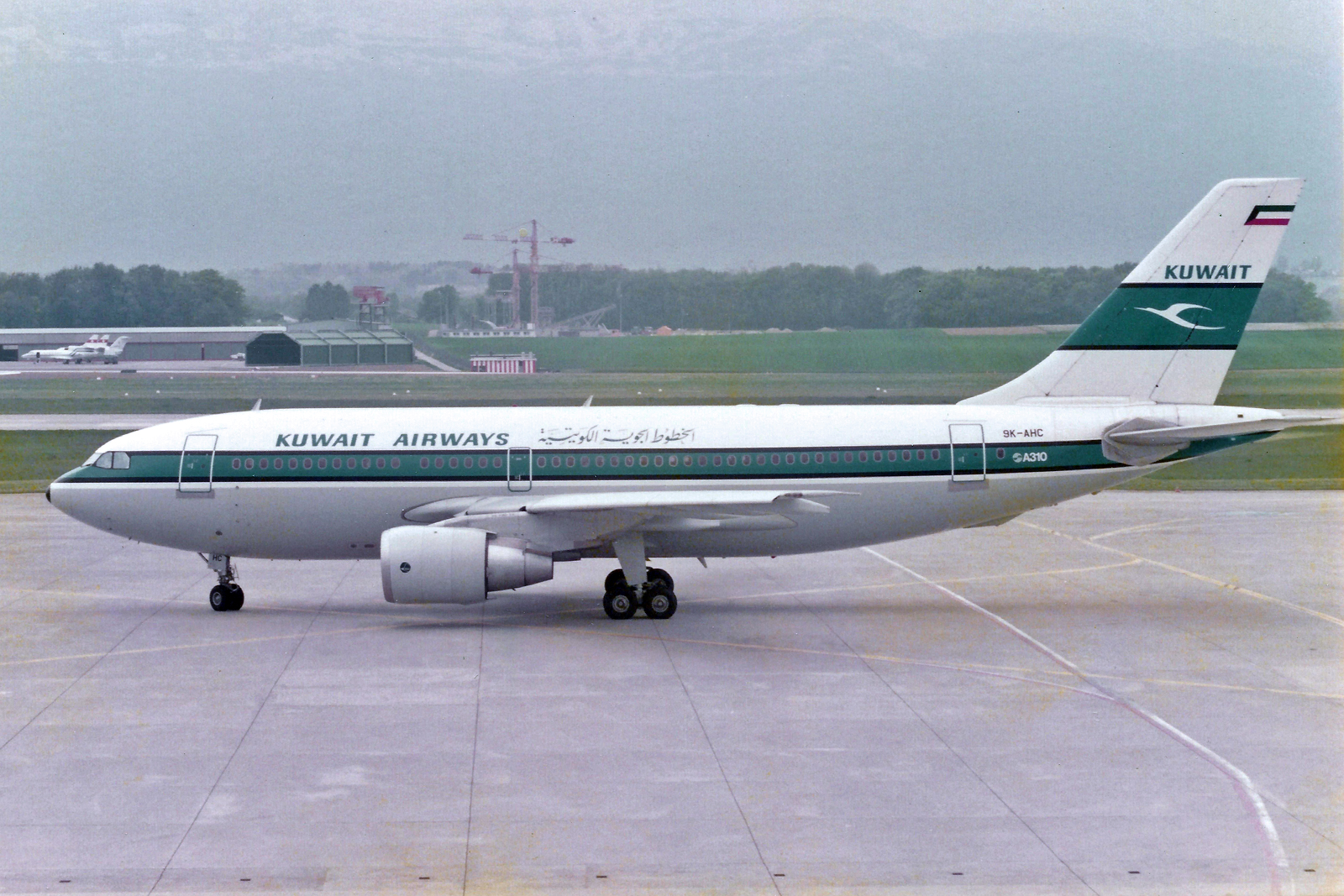
- 9K-AHC, aircraft involved in the incident

Hijacking
- Date: 3 December 1984
- Site: Mashhad, Iran

Aircraft
- Aircraft type: Airbus A310-222
- Aircraft name: Kadhma
- Operator: Kuwait Airways
- IATA flight No.: KU221
- ICAO flight No.: KAC221
- Call sign: KUWAITI 221
- Registration: 9K-AHC
- Flight origin: Kuwait International Airport
- 1st stopover: Dubai International Airport
- Destination: Jinnah International Airport, Karachi
- Occupants: 161 (including 4 hijackers)
- Passengers: 153 (including 4 hijackers)
- Crew: 8
- Fatalities: 2 (Charles Hegna, William Stanford)
- Survivors: 159 (Include 147 passengers, 8 crew and 4 hijackers)

Kuwait Airways Flight 221, was a scheduled passenger flight from Kuwait City, Kuwait, to Karachi, Pakistan, via Dubai, United Arab Emirates, operated by an Airbus A310. On 3 December 1984, the flight was hijacked by four armed Lebanese Shia militants, reportedly affiliated with the Hezbollah movement. The hijacking resulted in a six-day hostage crisis and the murder of two American passengers. The incident is considered one of the earliest major hijackings linked to Middle Eastern militant groups in the 1980s. The hijacking also known as The Kadhma Incident

== Background ==
Flight 221 was operated by Kuwait Airways and involved an Airbus A310-222 aircraft, registration 9K-AHC, had the first flight in 1983, msn 278. The flight departed Kuwait International Airport with 161 people on board, including passengers and crew. After take-off from Kuwait City, four Lebanese men armed with guns and grenades hijacked the aircraft and diverted it to Mehrabad, Iran. (Note: There are conflicting reports regarding the type of aircraft hijacked. Aviation Safety Network claims the hijacked aircraft was a Kuwait Airways's Airbus A300C4-620 with registration number 9K-AHG, while many Kuwaiti media outlets, as well as photos from the scene of the hijacking, show the aircraft involved as an Airbus A310-222, registration number 9K-AHC, aircraft name Kadhma (Arabic: كاظمة).)

== Hijacking ==
After taking control of the aircraft, the hijackers ordered the crew to fly to Iran. Iranian authorities at first denied permission to land, but eventually relented when they learned the aircraft was low on fuel. The plane landed at Mashhad International Airport in northeastern Iran.

Once on the ground, the hijackers issued formal demands for the release of the 17 prisoners held in Kuwait due to their involvement in the 1983 Kuwait bombings. Over the course of the standoff, women, children, and Muslim passengers were gradually released. However, the situation escalated when two American officials, Charles Hegna and William Stanford (employees of USAID), were shot dead and their bodies dumped on the runway.

The few dozen passengers who remained on board—particularly Americans—were reportedly threatened and tortured. "Every five minutes there was a frightening incident. There was no letup at all," British flight engineer Neil Beeston told the BBC.

Paradoxically, the hijackers released a statement claiming: "We do not have any enmity toward anyone and we do not intend to deny the freedom of anyone or to frighten anyone..."

Passengers who remained on board reported being threatened, physically abused, and beaten for speaking without permission.

== Iranian involvement ==
The Iranian government engaged in negotiations with the hijackers but did not meet their demands. On 8 December 1984, Iranian Revolutionary Guard forces stormed the aircraft and freed the remaining hostages. Reports suggest the assault was swift and effective, with minimal additional injuries.

Authorities initially announced that the hijackers would be brought to trial. However, they were ultimately released and allowed to leave the country. This led to allegations of Iranian complicity in the hijacking and claims by some passengers and officials that the rescue operation had been staged. At least one Kuwaiti and two Pakistani passengers claimed that after landing, the hijackers received additional weapons and equipment, including handcuffs and nylon ropes used to tie passengers to their seats. One American official remarked, "You do not invite cleaners aboard an airplane after you have planted explosives, promised to blow up the plane, and read your last will and testament.

== Aftermath ==
The hijacking of Flight 221 had significant geopolitical ramifications. It highlighted the growing influence of militant Shi'a groups in the Middle East and their willingness to target Gulf states allied with the United States. The incident also intensified tensions between Kuwait and Iran, particularly as Kuwait was supporting Iraq in the ongoing Iran–Iraq War.

The flight crew and many passengers later testified to the trauma and physical abuse endured during the ordeal. The incident also served as a precursor to a wave of hijackings and hostage crises throughout the 1980s, particularly involving Hezbollah and its affiliates. The US State Department announced a $250,000 reward for information leading to the arrests of those involved in the hijacking but made no military response. Later press reports linked Hezbollah's Imad Mughniyah to the hijackings.

After the hijacking, the aircraft was held in Iran for 17 months before Kuwait redeemed it on 7 May 1986. By August 1990, the aircraft had been seized by Iraq during the Gulf War, and was returned to Kuwait Airways in October 1992. The aircraft continued to operate for Türkiye's Holiday Air and Sudan Airways before being converted to cargo for FedEx in 1999, with registration number N454FE. With its retirement in April 2016, it became the last operational Airbus A310-200 in the world.

== In popular culture ==
The incident was mentioned along with Kuwait Airways Flight 422 hijacking in the series Al Jabriya: Flight 422, produced by director Ashley Pearce, was released on the Shahid streaming platform in 2023, but was quickly removed from the platform due to backlash from the Kuwaiti government and public opinion.

Days of Terror: The untold story of KU 221 & KU 422, a documentary film recounting the incident, was released in 2021.

== See also ==
- Kuwait Airways Flight 422
- TWA Flight 847
- 1983–1988 Kuwait terror attacks
- Iran–Iraq War
