= Arab Times =

English-language newspaper

- Type: Daily newspaper
- Format: Print, online
- Owner: Ahmed Al-Jarallah
- Editor-in-chief: Ahmed Al-Jarallah
- Founded: 1977; 49 years ago
- Language: English
- Headquarters: Al Shuwaikh, Al Asimah
- Circulation: 48,000 (2001)
- Sister newspapers: Al Seyassah
- OCLC number: 7442756
- Website: arabtimesonline.com

Arab Times is the first English-language newspaper published in independent Kuwait.

== History ==
The Arab Times was launched in 1977 by Dar Al-Seyassah as a weekly publication, and soon became a daily newspaper, playing a remarkable role in Kuwait and the Persian Gulf area. The paper is based in Al Shuwaikh. The newspaper reported its 2001 circulation as 48,000 copies.

The current editor-in-chief of the daily is Ahmed Al-Jarallah.

== See also ==
- List of newspapers in Kuwait
