= Al-Nida' (Kuwait) =

Former Kuwaiti newspaper

- Publisher: Dar Al-Aruba for Press, Publishing and Distribution
- Founded: 11 August 1990
- Ceased publication: 1 January 1991
- Language: Arabic language
- Headquarters: Kuwait City

Al-Nida' ('The Call') was a newspaper published from Kuwait City during the Iraqi occupation 1990–1991.

In August 1990 the Iraqi authorities shut down the al-Qabas newspaper and founded al-Nida using the requisitioned facilities of al-Qabas. Al-Nida' was the sole newspaper published in Kuwait during this period. It was distributed for free in Kuwait. It was also sold in Jordan. The newspaper carried speeches by Saddam Hussein and information of laws and decrees issues by the Iraqi authorities.

The newspaper was shut down on 1 January 1991, without any stated explanation. After the fall of Iraqi rule in Kuwait, 24 former employees of al-Nida were tried in Martial Law Court.
