= Al Rai (Kuwaiti newspaper) =

Kuwaiti newspaper

Al Rai الرأي
- Type: Daily newspaper
- Owner: Jassem Boodai
- Editor-in-chief: Waleed AlJassim
- Managing editor: Ali Roz
- Founded: 16 April 1995; 31 years ago as AlRay AlAam
- Language: Arabic
- Headquarters: Kuwait
- Website: www.alraimedia.com

Al Rai (Arabic: الرأي, lit. 'The Opinion'), which was published as Al Rai Alaam (Arabic: الرأي العام, lit. 'Public Opinion') from 1995 to 2006, is a Kuwaiti daily newspaper. According to a 2007 survey by the Washington-based Intermedia group, Al Rai ranked one among Kuwaiti newspapers for the fifth year in a row.

== History and profile ==
The Al Rai Alaam newspaper license was rented to Jassim Al Boodai (the Al Rai owner) in 1995, and it was published as Al Rai in 2006 after the new press law. Egyptian journalist Abdallah Kamal was the advisor of the paper.

The paper contains numerous interviews with world leaders. The newspaper is known for generally supporting the Kuwaiti government and the ruling family. Its circulation for 2001 was 87,000 copies.

In 2004, Al Rai launched a satellite TV, Al Rai TV, which merged with the newspaper to create the Al Rai Media Group. The newspaper also launched its online content as a free service.

In 2010, the paper's online version was the eighth most visited website in the Middle East and North Africa.

== See also ==
- List of newspapers in Kuwait
