= Ahmed Al-Jarallah =

Kuwaiti businessman and journalist

- أحمد عبد العزيز الجار الله
- Born: 1942 (age 83–84); Kuwait
- Years active: 1963–present

Ahmed Abel Aziz Al-Jarallah (Arabic: أحمد عبد العزيز الجار الله; born 1942, also spelled Ahmad Al-Jarallah) is a Kuwaiti journalist, author, and the editor-in-chief of the Kuwaiti newspapers Arab Times and Al-Seyassah and owner of the weekly magazine Al-Hadaf.

== Biography ==
Jarallah was born in 1942, and according to a leaked US diplomatic cable from 1989 is "a Kuwaiti of relatively recent Saudi origin [and] relatively humble background". In 1963, Al-Jarallah started his journalism career as a junior reporter in the Kuwaiti daily Al Rai Alaam, eventually becoming Managing Editor and Deputy Editor-in-Chief. In 1965, he left the newspaper to join the weekly magazine Al-Seyassah as Editor-in-Chief. In the late 1960s, Al-Jarallah was able to "parlay a winning personality and a friendship with the then-minister of information [Jaber Al-Ali Al-Sabah] into a publishing empire". In 1968, he bought Al-Seyassah, a weekly magazine at the time, from Abdulaziz Al-Masaeed with a bank loan and then secured the license from his friend the minister to turn the weekly magazine into a daily newspaper.

In 1977, Jarallah expanded Al-Seyassah into a media group, which also published the English-language Arab Times newspaper and the weekly magazine Al-Hadaf (Arabic: الهدف, lit. 'The Target'), In 1977, the assets of Al-Seyassah were estimated at more than five million Kuwaiti dinars ($17.25m), which included what was described as the most modern printing press in the Middle East. In 2011, Al-Jarallah received a Challenger 605 business jet from Bombardier Aerospace.

Assassination attempts

On April 23, 1985, Al-Jarallah faced an assassination attempt when a gunman opened fire on him outside his offices. He was shot six times, and was rushed to the nearby Al-Razi Hospital by his driver, seriously injured. An organization under the name Arab Revolutionary Brigades claimed responsibility. It was suspected that Palestinian militant group Abu Nidal Organization (ANO) was behind the assassination attempt. Leaked US diplomatic cables describe observers connecting this assassination attempt to some of Al-Jarallah's political views.

On 11 December 2003, Al-Jarallah's secretary at Al-Seyassah was injured when he opened a large envelope addressed to Jarallah, sent from Beirut, Lebanon. The envelope bomb contained the plastic explosive Semtex. The motive and source of the bombing was unclear, however it has been reported that the pro-Saudi newspaper led by Al-Jarallah had been critical of religious extremists and terrorism in Saudi Arabia, and supported the U.S.-led war in Iraq.

== Editorial views ==
Jarallah's published views in the 1980s were described in leaked US diplomatic cables and by the CIA as "pro-Saudi, pro-Egyptian ... supporting of Egyptian President Anwar Sadat's overtures to Israel, critical of Palestinian extremism ... calling on the PLO to moderate its policies, hardline anti-Syrian, the Iranian regime, and Iraq's territorial ambitions in Kuwait"

In 2004, in an editorial which was described as "breaking long-held taboos", Jarallah called for the Arab world to make peace with Israel and for Arab leaders to cease using the Palestinian people as a tool of their policies.

In 2010, Jarallah called on Palestinian Authority President Mahmoud Abbas to start unconditional negotiations with Israel.

In April 2011, in an interview to Al Arabiya News Channel, al-Jarallah accused Iran of inciting a Shiite revolution in the Gulf region, and for "trying to push Gulf nations to the brink of war through escalating disputes and using bullying tactics.”

== Books ==
- Expats guide to Kuwait. 1984. 288 p.
- هكذا عدت من الموت: So I came back from death. 1985. In Arabic.
