= Al-Anba (Kuwait) =

Al-Anba جريدة الانباء
- Type: Daily newspaper
- Owner: Bab Al-Kuwait Press Co.
- Founder: Khalid Y. Al Marzouq
- Publisher: Bab Al-Kuwait Press Co.
- Editor: Yousuf K. Al Marzouq
- Staff writers: 600
- Founded: 5 January 1976; 50 years ago
- Language: Arabic
- Headquarters: Kuwait City
- Circulation: 116,000 (2008)
- Website: Al Anbaa

Al-Anba (Arabic: الانباء, lit. 'The News') or alternatively Al-Anbaa is an Arabic-language Kuwaiti daily newspaper. The paper is owned and published by Bab Al-Kuwait Press Co.

== History and profile ==
The paper was launched on 5 January 1976. It is the continuation of Akhbar Al Kuwait which was published from 1962 to 1975.

During the invasion of Kuwait the paper was printed in Cairo, Egypt, from August 1990 to August 1991.

== Circulation and content ==
The paper is one of the most circulated publications in Kuwait. Its 2001 circulation of 107,000 copies made it the best selling newspaper in the country. In 2008, it was the first daily in Kuwait with a circulation of 116,000 copies. In 2010, Al Anbaa was the 39th among the top-ranked 50 online Arab papers in the MENA region. In 2012, it was one of the three most read dailies in the country.

At the beginning of 2012, the paper signed an agreement with IMC Digital to improve its popularity on social media. As a result of this effort, the paper reached 30,000 fans on Facebook, over 25,000 followers on Twitter and a minimum of 200,000 video views on YouTube within the first two months of 2012. Furthermore, hits on the newspaper website increased by 30% in the overall traffic and 20% in the traffic produced by search engines.

The content of the paper focuses on political, social, technical and sport news. It provides all these news in an uncritical way since the paper has a pro-government stance. However, in mid-June 1976, the offices of the paper in Al Sharq area were attacked. In addition, the publication of the paper was ceased twice, in March 1987 and in March 1995, by Kuwaiti courts. The paper also contains news on environmental issues.

== Staff and editors ==
One of the significant writers of the paper is Saleh Al Sayer.

The editors of the paper are as follows:

1. Nassir Abdulaziz Al Marzouq (5 January 1976 - 1 November 1978)
2. Faisal Yousef Al Marzouq (1 November 1978 - 25 June 1990)
3. Walid Khalid Yousuf Al Marzouq (26 June 1990 - 1 May 1995)
4. Bibi Khalid Yousuf Al Marzouq (2 May 1995 - 8 February 2009
5. Yousuf Khalid Yousuf Al Marzouq (8 February 2009 – present)

== See also ==
- List of newspapers in Kuwait
