= Alrai Alaam =

Kuwaiti newspaper

Al Rai Alaam الرأي العام
- Type: Daily (launched as a weekly)
- Owner: Almasaeed Family
- Founder: Abdulaziz Almasaeed
- Editor: Yousef Al masaaeed
- Founded: 16 April 1961 (65 years ago)
- Ceased publication: 1995
- Language: Arabic
- Headquarters: Kuwait City (previously headquartered in Beirut, Lebanon)
- Website: alrayalaam.com (in Arabic)

Al Ray Alaam (Arabic: الرأي العام, lit. 'Public Opinion') was a Kuwaiti Arabic-language daily newspaper that ceased publication in 1995.

== History and operations ==
The newspaper was launched by Abdulaziz Al Massaeed on 16 April 1961 as a weekly with the name of Al Rai Aam. Al Masaeed was both the owner and the publisher of the newspaper that was initially published in Beirut, Lebanon. Later it was relaunched as a daily based in Kuwait. Alrai Alaam ceased publication for ten days on 26 January 1970 when it was suspended by the Kuwaiti authorities due to its harsh criticism of the editorial of Mohamed Heikal published in the Egyptian newspaper Al-Ahram. The license of Alrai Alaam was rented to Jassim Al Boodai and in 1995, and it was re-published as Al Rai in 2006 after the new press law and under new ownership.

== See also ==
- List of Arab newspapers
- List of newspapers in Kuwait
- List of newspapers in Lebanon
