= Al-Watan (Kuwait) =

Daily newspaper in Kuwait (1974–2015)

Al Watan
- Type: Daily newspaper
- Publisher: Al Watan publishing house
- Editor-in-chief: Khalifa Al Ali Al Sabah
- Associate editor: Waleed Al Jasem
- Founded: 17 January 1974
- Ceased publication: January 2015
- Language: Arabic
- Headquarters: Shuwaikh, Kuwait City
- Website: Al Watan

Al-Watan (in Arabic الوطن meaning The Homeland) was a Kuwaiti Arabic language daily published by the Al Watan publishing house. The editor in chief was Khalifa Al Ali Al Sabah, a member of the Kuwaiti ruling family, Al Sabah. The paper was in circulation between 1974 and 2015.

== History and profile ==
The paper was launched in 1974. Al Watan was suspended by the Kuwaiti government on 30 August 1976. In April 2014, the paper and Alam Al Youm were temporarily closed down for two weeks by the Kuwaiti government due to the publication of a videotape showing former senior officials plotting a coup in Kuwait. In June 2014, both papers were shut down for five days because of the same reason.

In January 2015, the Kuwaiti government shut down Al Watan based on the grounds that the newspaper had violated the license law, since it had less than enough capital to maintain a license.

== Circulation ==
Al Watan sold 86,000 copies in 2001 making it the second best selling newspaper in the country. The 2006 circulation of the paper was 100,000 copies.

The paper's online version was the second most visited website for 2010 in the MENA region.
