= Abdullah Al-Salloum =

Kuwaiti economist

- عبد الله السلوم
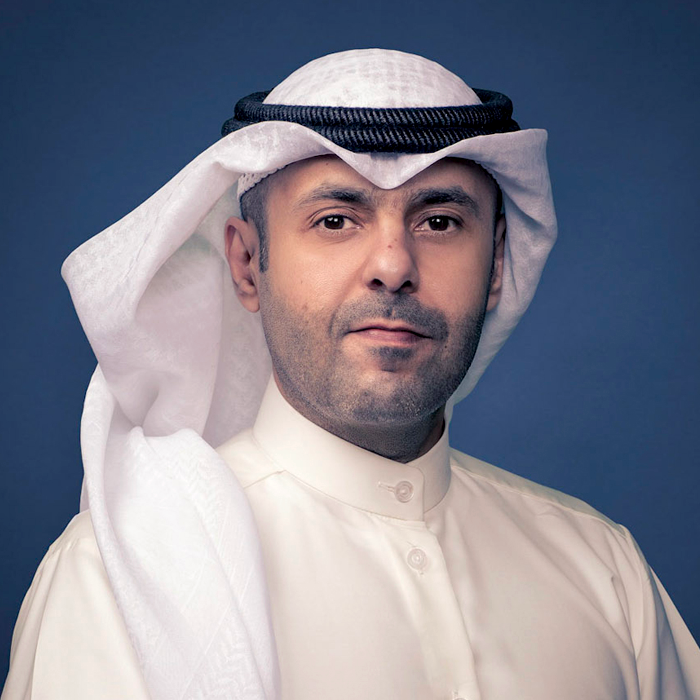
- Born: August 28, 1981 (age 45)
- Citizenship: Kuwait
- Education: Master of Business Administration MBA, BS in Computer Science BSCS, Certified International Project Manager CIPM. Gulf University for Science and Technology, American Academy of Financial Management.
- Occupations: Economist, entrepreneur, investor and author.
- Organization(s): Kuwait Economic Society, Kuwait Information Technology Society.
- Known for: Public domain dedication of new accounting techniques and publications on the principles of political economics.
- Notable work: IruSoft, Dhammin, Sultan of Najd, Kuwait of the Sustainability, Kingdom of the Vision and The Currency of Mount Serenity, Kuwait Policy Observatory.
- Family: Al Salloum, Wuhiba, Banu Tamim.
- Website: https://abdullah.kw

Signature
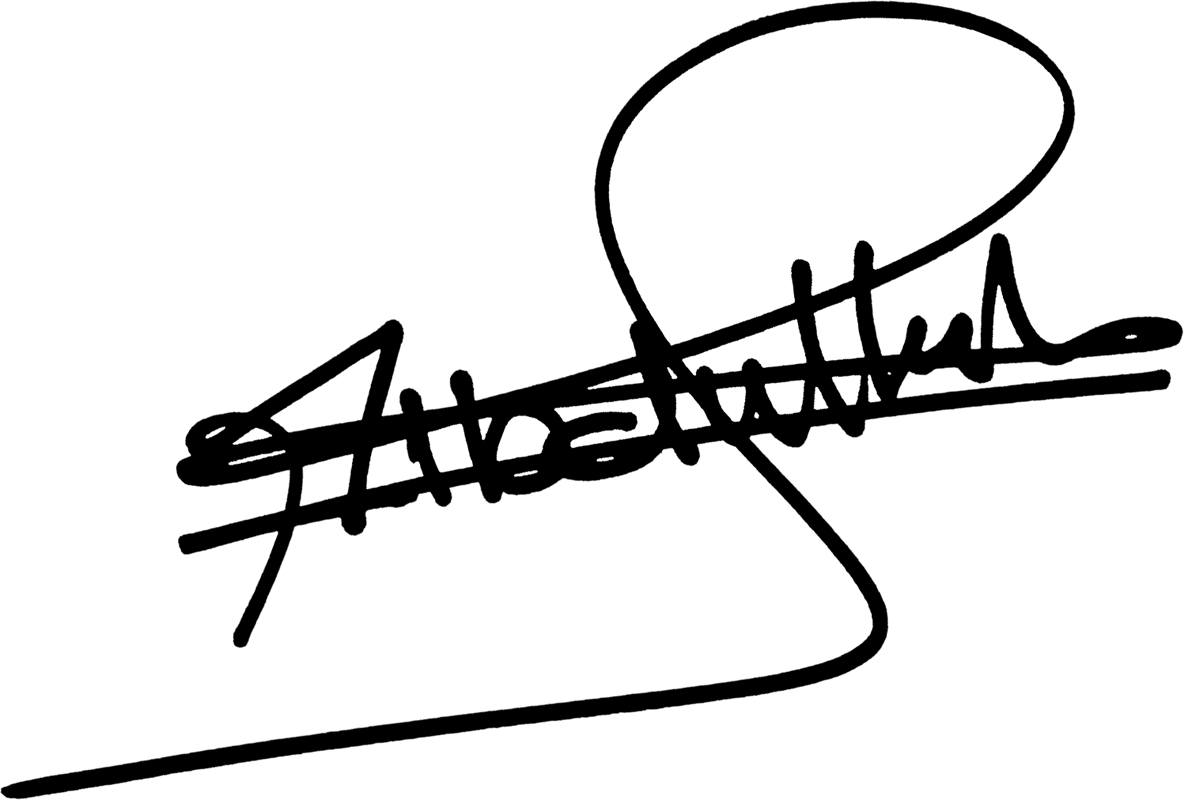

Abdullah Al-Salloum (Arabic: عبد الله السلوم; born Abdullah Salim Abdullah Al-Salloum, August 28, 1981) is a Kuwaiti economist, entrepreneur, investor, and author. He is known for his publications on the principles of political economy, for originating new accounting techniques that have been dedicated to the public domain as part of his social responsibility work, and for founding the Kuwait Policy Observatory.

== Early life and education ==
Al-Salloum was born on August 28, 1981, in Kuwait. He earned his master's degree in business administration and his bachelor's degree in computer science from Gulf University for Science and Technology. He's also earned a certification of international project management from the American Academy of Financial Management.

== Career ==
After a decade in the private sector, Al-Salloum joined the public sector in 2021 as advisor to the Minister of Commerce and Industry and then appointed director of the Center of Strategic Research and Development in the Insurance Regulatory Unit.

Al-Salloum led the transformation of supervision on the insurance sector by establishing IruSoft; an in-house implemented platform that introduces unique supervision-technology (suptech), insurance-technology (insurtech) and regulatory-technology (regtech) modules, by which the unit requires less resources to ensure fairness, transparency and competition and to prevent conflicts of interest in the sector.

== Views ==
=== Centralization and economic reform ===
In a January 2022 interview on Thmanyah, Al-Salloum argued that centralized decision-making may be more effective for resource-dependent economies, particularly oil-based states, while democratic systems are better suited to economies with diversified and sustainable structures. He described Kuwait as facing a structural challenge in this regard, operating as an oil-dependent economy within a decentralized legislative framework. Al-Salloum expressed the view that large-scale economic transformation requires direction from higher sovereign and executive levels, rather than reliance on parliamentary processes alone.

Al-Salloum further stated that comprehensive economic reform involves extensive legislative changes and coordination across multiple sectors, including social, cultural, and political domains. He suggested that the scale and complexity of such reforms—potentially involving the introduction and amendment of dozens of laws—would make implementation through conventional parliamentary procedures difficult. He characterized economic transformation as a process requiring structured planning, research, and institutional alignment, rather than incremental or populist-driven initiatives.

=== Commercial licensing and business concealment ===
In August 2026, commenting on Kuwait's suspension of new freelance business licences and the introduction of its anti-concealment law, Al-Salloum said that the freelance licensing framework was suitable for digital, professional and home-based businesses, but that the absence of dedicated commercial premises made conventional physical inspections more difficult. He described some nominee arrangements as “licence farms”, in which businesses were owned by citizens on paper in return for a fixed commission, while actual management, revenues and commercial decisions remained with unauthorised operators. He argued that such arrangements weakened accountability, distorted competition and reduced domestic reinvestment, and said that legally identifying the person who operated and benefited from a business would improve transparency, business standards and competitive fairness.

=== COVID-19 pandemic ===
In March 2020, in an earlier interview on Thmanyah, Al-Salloum speculated an unprecedented economic depression to take place in July 2020. The rationale was based on the paralysis of daily life caused by Lockdowns, where curfews caused a real decrease in consumption levels. Accordingly, the global economy was negatively affected as a result of a series of decreases in demand on energy-products as well as many others. On the same interview, he mentioned how the global economy, including the economy of the United States, would benefit from lowering oil prices during the pandemic, which contradicted the United States' presidential political view on oversupplying the oil markets.

As for regional economies, Kuwait's in particular, Al-Salloum warned that generous economic packages for the private sector will not be feasible for the economy when viewed in a macroeconomic perspective. He believes the private sector does not weigh enough Export-driven value in the gross-domestic-product's equation. In terms of 2020 budget deficit in Kuwait, he believes the pandemic was not the real cause, but an accelerator. He also believes a conditional Public Debt Bill would be the best available option when other reforming Legislations pass in parallel, in particular, the ones designated to accelerate the Export-based private sector.

=== Economy of Kuwait ===
In a study he has published in Alqabas newspaper, as well as in other interviews, Al-Salloum illustrated how the economy of Kuwait is driven by formulas whose heavy-weighted variables are out of local control. He demonstrated how the factors of those variables are changing in an exponential manner; pressuring future economic circumstances to be even more severe. He concluded that future economy-related decisions must consider a sustainable positive outcome for the gross domestic product equation, which only occurs by stimulating exports, shortening imports, or both concurrently.

=== Budget deficits in Kuwait ===
In another study he has published in Kuwait Times newspaper, Al-Salloum concluded that financial waste, corruption, isolation of returns of sovereign funds or insufficient government operational management are not the real cause of state budget deficits but the inability to overcome macroeconomic-related issues, such as transforming the state economy to an economy that is led by an exports-based private sub-sector.

=== Kuwaiti vision 2035 ===
Al-Salloum believes that Kuwaiti Vision 2035 has not followed the minimum standards of the sustainable development vision concept. His rationale was based on the insufficient methodology used to set the goals of that vision; by which a vision is just a collection of goals that will definitely be achieved once previously planned giant and large projects are executed. Hence, this vision would not require a real strategy to follow other than waiting.

=== Saudi vision 2030 ===
Unlike Kuwaiti Vision 2035, Al-Salloum sees Saudi Vision 2030 as a vision that follows reasonable standards of the sustainable development vision concept; defending most of its strategies in a book of six chapters. The reason behind having Al-Salloum focusing on the Saudi Arabian economy is the belief that Kuwait's economy, once sustainable, will be attached to the closest largest economy, Saudi Arabian.

=== Diversified economy ===
Al-Salloum's advised that following the leads of macroeconomic theories will be of an added value in moving the GCC economy from oil-based to diversified. Except for Kuwait, the decision-making process in all other GCC is centralized, where following those leads – in a direct manner – can be feasibly accomplished. For Kuwait's case, however, and because of the very distributed Decision-making process made by democracy, following those leads to have an effective economic reform must have a prior political reform.

=== Early retirement bill ===
Despite the 90% government-parliament consensus on Early Retirement Bill, Al-Salloum believes such a bill should be disregarded unless there will be real political outcomes exceeding future economic losses. He sees that, if the bill passes, the Public Institution For Social Security will accelerate towards an actuarial deficit that is predicted in 2067; making it less independent and more reliant on government treasury to cover its shortages. Al-Salloum's advised that the presence of actuarial figures in governmental-parliamentary committees would fill in the gap between the two authorities in this matter. He also advised that inefficient financial management and corruption within governmental institutions must not be an excuse to pass such bills, including Loans Dropping Bill. Legislations should consider those issues instead.

=== Belt and road initiative ===
In an interview with Xinhua, Al-Salloum stated that the Belt and Road Initiative can help create jobs, increase net exports, and attract even more foreign investments, which by the end increase the overall gross domestic product. In the interview, he stated that China has the expertise, manpower and industrial and logistic production ingredients, which crave entering a market or creating a new one. Kuwait, on the other hand, according to his opinion, has a good location that can be used to create mutual interests for both countries. Hence, he sees cooperation with China will have a positive impact on the development in Kuwait and leads the country to be more exposed and to prompt legislations to facilitate international trade.

=== U.S. Chinese tariffs ===
In another interview with Xinhua, Al-Salloum showed his visualization of China overcoming the tariffs crisis as its products are no longer globally seen as second-class, which can be justified by the improved use of expertise and research and development it has. He brought up Apple as an example where products are marketed as designed in California and assembled in China.

== Publications ==
=== Books ===
- Sultan of Najd (Arabic: سلطان نجد): (Subtitled: The throne advocating for fair wealth distribution - Arabic: الحكم المناصر لعدالة توزيع الثروة) (ISBN 978-1732537569) is a political economic novel that interprets –within the ancient Ukhaydhariya State– a series of events that exposed what was unknown by the throne, not only within the monetary scope, but the state politics, where the Emir gets introduced to reforming schemes meant to achieve the state's sustainability. The title was ranked the third bestseller on Amazon's Arabic Literature and Fiction category.

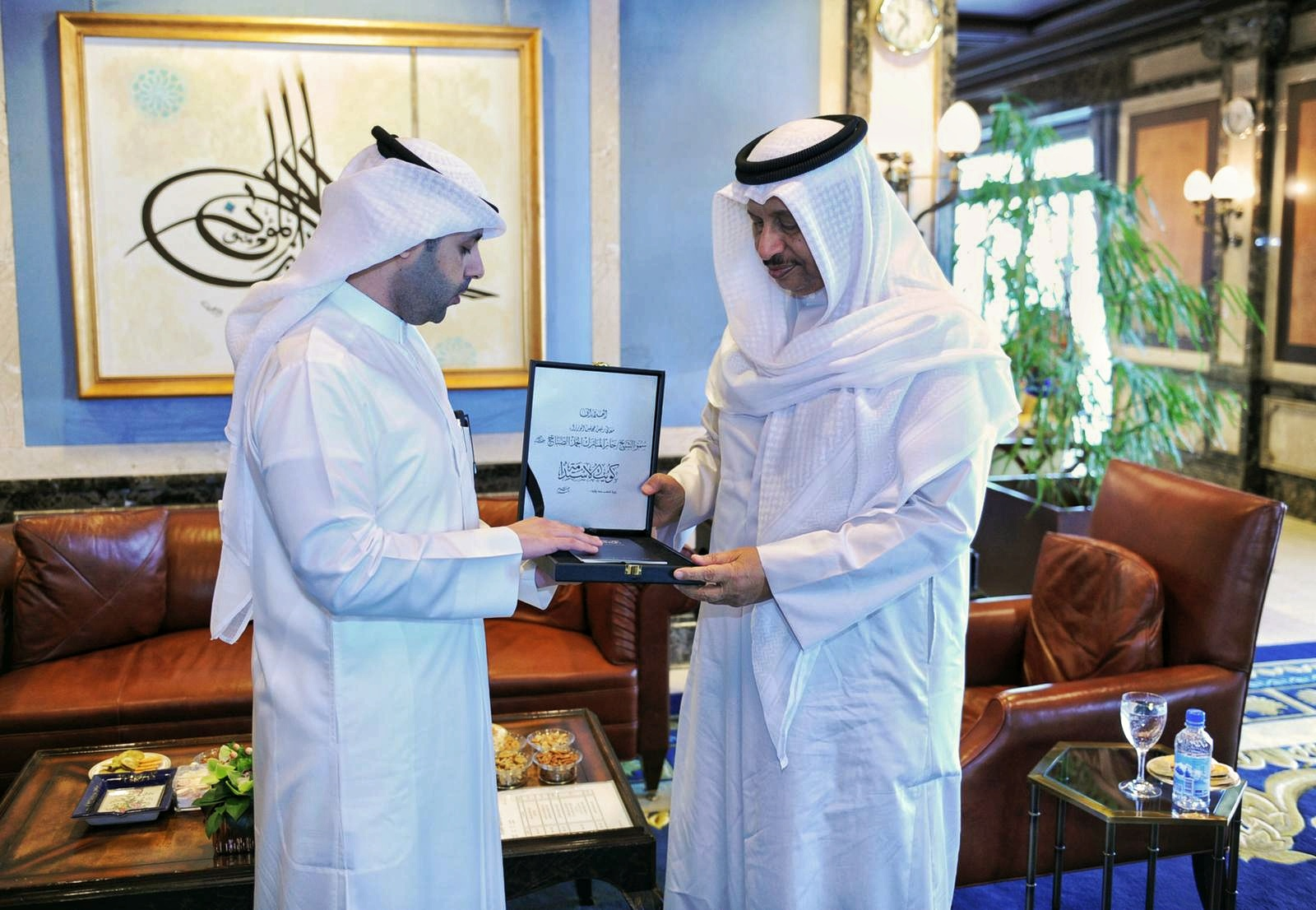
Al-Salloum presents Kuwait of the Sustainability vision to the Prime Minister of Kuwait, Sheikh Jaber Al-Mubarak Al-Sabah.

- Kuwait of the Sustainability (Arabic: كويت الاستدامة): (Subtitled: Vision of a people, from and to them. - Arabic: رؤية شعب، منه وإليه.) (ISBN 978-1732537538) A political economic book that extensively highlights the Kuwaiti economy in particular, aiming at clarifying the concept of sound economic vision through radical solutions targeting macro-economic issues of the state. In this title, which is introduced with appraisals by Prof. Ghanim Al-Najjar – the political science professor at Kuwait University –, Ali Al-Sanad, PhD – the Islamic studies professor at the General Authority for Applied Education and Training –, and Mr. Mohammed Al-Yousifi – the historical researcher and political analyst –, Al-Salloum looks forward to raise the awareness of the economic sense; in a way that makes individuals see and understand the consequences of political and administrative decision-making outcomes, build their own view and critical opinion while being fully aware of the subject matter. The title concludes that moving Kuwait from rent to sustainability requires a major reform at the macro-economic level, a reform whose impact would wipe all political, organizational behavioral, and micro-economic obstacles facing the state.
- Kingdom of the Vision (Arabic: مملكة الرؤية): (Subtitled: Within The Conflicts Of Sustainability And Rent - Arabic: بين مصارع الريعية والاستدامة) (ISBN 978-0692144862) An economic book that extensively elaborates on Saudi Arabia's Vision 2030; linking its strategy to macroeconomics' theories. The title was ranked as best-seller on Jamalon – middle-east's largest online book retailer – as well as on Amazon's Arabic books' category.
- The Currency of Mount Serenity (Arabic: مال جبال السكينة): A novel (Subtitled: The monetary system: from favor to post-tar-inar eras - Arabic: النظام المالي بين حقبتي الامتنان وما بعد الزفتينار) (ISBN 978-9996617980) that interprets – in a virtual world – the historic development eras of the real monetary system. The title was ranked as best-seller on Jamalon; middle-east's largest online books retailer.

In October 2026, Al-Salloum made digital editions of his economics books available free of charge through his official website as part of a social responsibility initiative, introducing a system for issuing personalized digital copies licensed to individual readers.

=== Studies ===
- Sahel and the Great Automation – (January 2026) Abdullah.kw
- The Truth Behind Kuwait's Budget Deficits – (February 2020) Kuwait Times Newspaper
- The Broad Scope of the SME's Fund Law: Prone to Economically Unsound Direction – (September 2019) Abdullah.kw
- Economy of Kuwait Is Driven By Out-of-Control Variables – (August 2019) Alqabas Newspaper

=== Articles ===
- On Borrowing from Future Generations (Arabic) – (September 2026) Kuwait Times and Aljarida Newspapers
- Pension Funds: The Cost of the Moment (Arabic) – (August 2026) Kuwait Times and Aljarida Newspapers
- What Dispersed Capital Is Waiting For (Arabic) – (August 2026) Kuwait Times and Aljarida Newspapers
- The Gulf’s Compute Bargain (Arabic) – (August 2026) Kuwait Times and Aljarida Newspapers
- The Economics of the Foreign Investor (Arabic) – (August 2026) Kuwait Times and Aljarida Newspapers
- Privatization and nationalization: Means, not ends (Arabic) – (August 2026) Kuwait Times and Aljarida Newspapers
- Non-oil exports...please! (Arabic) – (July 2026) Kuwait Times and Aljarida Newspapers
- Every word in its rightful place (Arabic) – (July 2026) Kuwait Times and Aljarida Newspapers
- Beyond Accountability (Arabic) – (June 2026) Kuwait Times and Aljarida Newspapers
- Beginnings Do Not Suffice – (June 2026) Kuwait Times Newspaper
- The Orbit of Symbolism.. From One Era to Another – (June 2026) Kuwait Times Newspaper
- The IPO wave: Between growth and exit – (June 2026) Kuwait Times Newspaper
- On Disciplining Debate: Kuwait and the Age of Difficult Calm – (June 2026) Kuwait Times Newspaper
- The Gulf beyond ‘energy surplus’ – (May 2026) Kuwait Times Newspaper
- Kuwait and the Art of Sovereign Positioning – (May 2026) Abdullah.kw
- The Rise of the Credit Rating: A Mark of Strong Solvency… Not Sustainability – (November 2025) Abdullah.kw
- The Jurisprudence of Transformation… When the Market Is Tested in Depth – (November 2025) Abdullah.kw
- Contraction of Consumer Spending… A Behavioral Approach Toward Fairly Diagnosing the Cause – (November 2025) Abdullah.kw
- The Doctrine of Import Dependence… Held Hostage by the Illusion of Sufficiency – (November 2025) Alqabas Newspaper
- The National Registry of Export Output… A Path of Maturity Toward Sustainable Investment – (October 2025) Alqabas Newspaper
- The Supreme Economic Council… A Sovereign Scale for Correcting the Course – (October 2025) Alqabas Newspaper
- Subsidies… Between the Gentleness of Policy and the Justice of Balance – (October 2025) Alqabas Newspaper
- The National Economic Foresight Authority… Before Absence Becomes Entrenched – (October 2025) Alqabas Newspaper
- The Implicit Conclusion of the Era of Paper Currency – (October 2025) Alqabas Newspaper
- The Generality of the National Fund Law… Between the Virtue of Flexibility and the Pitfall of Distortion – (September 2025) Alqabas Newspaper
- If Digitalization Is a Decorated Door… Then Automation Is the Entire House – (September 2025) Alqabas Newspaper
- The Triadic Economy… When Glory Is Built Brick by Brick – (September 2025) Alqabas Newspaper
- When Insurance Pricing Becomes a Measure of Justice – (September 2025) Alqabas Newspaper
- The Public Authority for Supporting Non-Oil Exports – (August 2025) Alqabas Newspaper
- The Public Authority for Wellbeing… Toward a Sound Economic Strategy – (August 2025) Alqabas Newspaper
- From Oil to Diversification… A New Equation for Managing Public Debt – (August 2025) Alqabas Newspaper
- Centralization of Legislation… A Cost That May Well Be Worth It – (May 2024) Alqabas Newspaper
- The Path to Restoring the Prestige of Logic – (May 2024) Alqabas Newspaper
- Has the Government Program Considered the Real Flaw? – (December 2020) Alqabas Newspaper
- The Kuwaiti Dinar, Where to? – (October 2020) Thmanyah Publishing
- The Reasons Behind Generousity Differences in COVID-19's Economic Packages – (September 2020) Alqabas Newspaper
- Well-Being Within Money Eras – (September 2020) Thmanyah Publishing
- Kuwait's Economy on The Verge of No Return – (August 2020) Alqabas Newspaper
- A Recession is Closer, Thank you OPEC+ – (April 2020) Alqabas Newspaper
- Public Debt Bill is Inevitable, But..! – (April 2020) Alqabas Newspaper
- Nazahah's Memorandum of Understanding With Egypt – (December 2019) Alqabas Newspaper
- KOTS Series: Kuwait of the Sustainability – (December 2019) Alqabas Newspaper
- We Complain Whilst We're The Defect – (December 2019) Alqabas Newspaper
- KOTS Series: Vision, The Concept – (November 2019) Alqabas Newspaper
- KOTS Series: The Turning Point II – (November 2019) Alqabas Newspaper
- KOTS Series: The Turning Point I – (November 2019) Alqabas Newspaper
- KOTS Series: Management In Rentier State II – (November 2019) Alqabas Newspaper
- KOTS Series: Management In Rentier State I – (November 2019) Alqabas Newspaper
- May God Help You, First Northern Zour – (September 2019) Alqabas Newspaper
- KOTS Series: Society In Rentier State II – (October 2019) Alqabas Newspaper
- KOTS Series: Society In Rentier State I – (October 2019) Alqabas Newspaper
- KOTS Series: Realization Moment – (September 2019) Alqabas Newspaper
- KOTS Series: Introduction – (September 2019) Alqabas Newspaper
- We're The Healing That We Don't See, The Disease That We Don't Feel – (September 2019) Alqabas Newspaper
- Actuarial Implications of Early Retirement Bill – (January 2019) Aljarida Newspaper
- Loans Dropping, As If Abu Zaid Did Not Invade – (December 2018) Aljarida Newspaper
- Between The Scarcity of Housing And Aunt Hissa's Mash, There Is A Long Story – (December 2018) Aljarida Newspaper
- Democracy And Rentier State Do Not Converge – (December 2018) Aljarida Newspaper
- No Sustainability Without Private Sector's Exports – (November 2018) Aljarida Newspaper
- Constitution's Knight: The Game's Pawn – (November 2018) Aljarida Newspaper
- Saudi Aramco: Borrowing To Repurchase – (February 2018) Alphabeta Argaam
- Accelerating Entrepreneurship Remains Rentier – (February 2018) Alphabeta Argaam
- Scarcity In Fiat And Virtual Currencies – (January 2018) Alphabeta Argaam
- Ripple: The Highest ROI In 2017 – (January 2018) Alvexo News
- Bitcoin: Where to? – (December 2017) Alvexo News
- Saudi Arabian 2017–2018 Annual Report – (December 2017) Alphabeta Argaam
- Anti-Corruption In Saudi Aramco's Listing Equation – (November 2017) Alvexo News
- NEOM: Singapore Of The Red Sea – (October 2017) Alvexo News
- Baitek And Ahli United: Merger And Acquisition – (October 2017) Alphabeta Argaam
- Non-Rentier Vs. Sustainability – (October 2017) Alphabeta Argaam
- Reduction Of Retirement Age: The Actuarial Perspective – (September 2017) Alphabeta Argaam
- Diseconomies Of Scale In E-Businesses – (September 2017) Alphabeta Argaam
- Artificial Intelligence In Business Decision Making – (September 2017) Alphabeta Argaam
- JASTA And The IPO Of Saudi Aramco – (September 2017) Alphabeta Argaam
- Pricey Criteria Towards Reasoning – (August 2017) Alqabas Newspaper
- Islamic Finance and ISIS – (July 2017) Alqabas Newspaper
- Wobbling Bridge – (July 2017) Alqabas Newspaper
- Technical Analysis On Thursday's Plate – (June 2017) Alqabas Newspaper
- Sustainability Of Mash And An Actuarial Cinnamon – (June 2017) Alqabas Newspaper
- Sovereign Funds, And Youth – (May 2017) Alqabas Newspaper
- Your Highness, Don't Use Others' Excuse! – (May 2017) Alqabas Newspaper
- Injustice Towards The Minister – (May 2017) Alqabas Newspaper
- Citizens And Expatriates Are Equal Towards A Country's Wealth – (April 2017) Alqabas Newspaper
- Economic Philosophy And Monetary Systems – (April 2017) Alqabas Newspaper
- Santiago And The Investments Of Our Sovereign Funds – (March 2017) Alqabas Newspaper
- The Sustainability Of A Competitive Business Environment And Foreign Residents – (March 2017) Aljarida Newspaper
- The Valuation Of Saudi Aramco – (March 2017) Alqabas and Elaph Newspapers
- Our Vision And Theirs – (February 2017) Alqabas Newspaper

== Kuwait policy observatory ==
Al-Salloum founded the Kuwait Policy Observatory, which focuses on monitoring public policy in Kuwait from an economic and institutional perspective. The observatory approaches reform as a set of policy trajectories that can be observed and analyzed, rather than as isolated decisions or daily news developments. It publishes its content in Arabic and English, with a focus on issues related to the Kuwaiti economy. The observatory is structured around a number of monitoring tracks that provide entry points for understanding reform trends in Kuwait. These tracks include: (1) fiscal sustainability, (2) economic diversification, (3) private sector autonomy, (4) labor productivity, (5) governance and accountability, and (6) digital transformation.

The fiscal sustainability track examines the ability of fiscal policy to finance the state model on a sustainable basis, while reducing dependence on non-sustainable revenues, particularly oil revenues. The economic diversification track focuses on the economy’s ability to develop sources of value, production, and income beyond dependence on oil and demand financed by public spending. The private sector autonomy track examines the ability of the private sector to generate value, assume risk, and improve productivity beyond the boundaries of government contracts, protection, and public demand.

With regard to the labor market, the labor productivity track measures the extent to which the labor market is moving from a model based on numerical employment toward one based on skills, output, and added value. The governance and accountability track examines the ability of institutions to translate public decisions into performance that can be measured, reviewed, and corrected, rather than limiting reform to general announcements or isolated measures. The digital transformation track treats digitalization as a test of the state’s ability to simplify procedures, integrate data, and improve implementation efficiency, rather than merely launching applications or electronic services.

The observatory uses a set of concise analytical indicators within each track, including institutional readiness, reform opportunity, policy direction, pace of movement, risk level, and policy outlook. It also provides a general assessment for each track, indicating its current position and whether it is positive, transitional, stalled, or in crisis, based on a composite reading of these indicators. The observatory does not aim to issue final judgments or follow the daily details of implementation, but rather to provide a general framework for reading broader trends in public policy. It also distinguishes between the general analysis made available to the public and the technical details related to policy sequencing, institutional models, and measurement tools, which it reserves for specialized discussions with relevant entities, policymakers, and stakeholders.

== Dhammin ==
Al-Salloum has founded Dhammin (Arabic: ضمّن); a smart political platform that manages candidates' electoral campaigns for the National Assembly, Municipal council or Cooperative Society councils. It has been stated in news reports and interviews that the platform is the first within the field to apply distributed-systems' methodologies.

== Accounting techniques ==
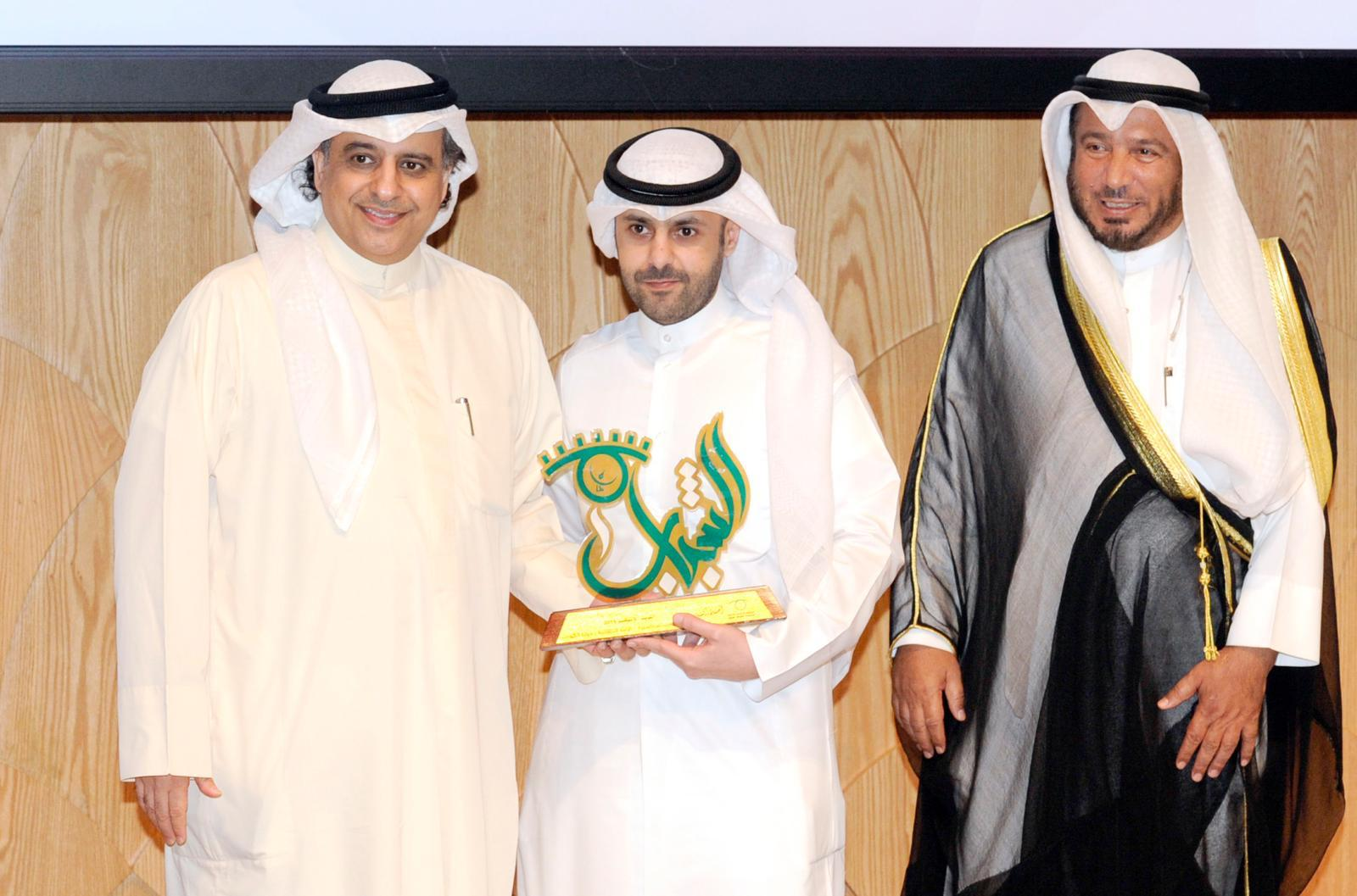
Al-Salloum receiving the Award of Youth Volunteer and Humanitarian Initiatives Forum. Shows Mr. Al-Khamees, forum secretary general and Dr. Al-Matouq, the advisor of the Kuwaiti Emir.

Al-Salloum has developed – then dedicated to public domain – new accounting techniques using an open-source code and gave it a – CC0 – license to be developed and republished as part of social responsibility. The techniques help businesspeople to easily create qualified and advanced feasibility studies (managerial, technical, financial and market feasibility, as well as pricing mechanism) by inserting basic information. These techniques also assist Households rationalize their Expenses, to either raise savings or lower liabilities, with a minimum lifestyle change. The techniques have expanded to determine the valuation of running businesses for the purpose of acquisition or sale; creating more efficient negotiation outcomes. Al-Salloum has given free workshops on how such techniques can be used to get more realistic and reasonable results.

In November 2019, Al-Salloum, as the author of these accounting techniques, received the Award of Youth Volunteer and Humanitarian Initiatives Forum, along with 14 others out of 620 initiatives participating from 16 different Arab countries.

In April 2026, Al-Salloum announced a global expansion of the Techniques platform, making its tools available in both Arabic and English and extending support to international currencies. The expansion marked a transition from a primarily regional focus to broader accessibility. According to the announcement, the platform had generated over 14,000 feasibility studies, more than 3,800 personal expense rationalization reports, and over 1,100 business valuation studies.

== Awards ==
- Award of Youth Volunteer and Humanitarian Initiatives Forum
