= IruSoft =

Insurance regulatory platform

- Developer(s): Abdullah Al-Salloum
- Written in: PHP, HTML, JavaScript
- Operating system: iOS, Android, UNIX, macOS, Microsoft Windows
- Type: RegTech
- Website: portal.iru.gov.kw

IruSoft (Arabic: آيروسوفت) is an insurance regulatory platform designated for licensing, supervision and inspection of the insurance sector within a country. The platform introduced unique supervision-technology (suptech), insurance-technology (insurtech) and regulatory-technology (regtech) automated modules by which a regulator requires less resources to ensure fairness, transparency and competition and to prevent conflicts of interest in the sector. IruSoft was founded by Abdullah Al-Salloum and owned by the Insurance Regulatory Unit in Kuwait.

The Insurance Regulatory Unit optimized processing insurance-sector's customer complaints by issuing Resolution No. (1) of 2022 that introduced IruSoft's complaints public module; an automated resolution center, by which the process of receiving submitted complaints, passing them on to the platforms of licensed insurance companies, tracking matter-related discussions and updates and getting them escalated if unresolved to be discussed by a committee assigned by the unit is integrally automated and analyzed for better key performance indicators.
