= Gulf University for Science and Technology =

Private university in Kuwait

Coordinates: 29.276068°N 48.055186°E

GUST
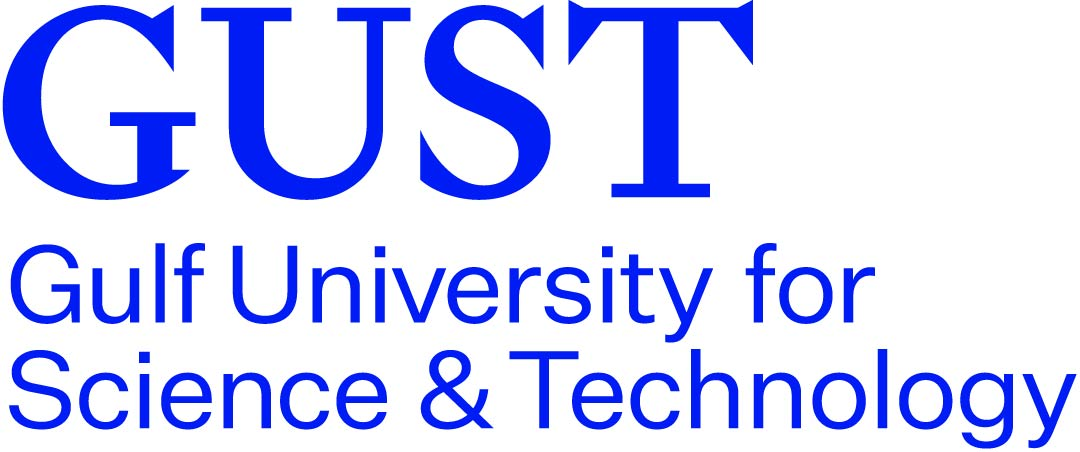
- Motto: Universitas in omne tempus.
- Motto in English: A University for Life.
- Type: Private
- Established: 2002; 24 years ago
- President: Prof. Bashar Ibrahim
- Location: West Mishref, Kuwait
- Campus: Urban
- Colors: Pioneer Blue
- Nickname: Falcons
- Website: gust.edu.kw

Gulf University for Science & Technology (GUST) is the first private university established in Kuwait. It has a dual-enrollment agreement with the University of Missouri–St. Louis.

== History ==
The university was to be a supplement to Kuwait University, the only institution of higher education in Kuwait at that time, and to serve the educational demands of the local society and the Persian Gulf region. In January 1997, Kuwaiti Academic Group, composed of 41 faculty members from Kuwait University, was founded to lay the foundation for the proposed “University of the Future.” Their studies culminated in a vision of the “Gulf University for Science & Technology.”

A partnership was established with the University of Missouri at St. Louis (UMSL), the international counterpart university chosen to help bring the university to fruition. The development was facilitated by the Private Universities Decree, No. 34, issued by the State of Kuwait in 2000, resulting in the establishment of a temporary campus in Hawally. The issuance of Emiri Decree No. 156 in 2002 completed the legal establishment of GUST as the first private university in the State of Kuwait and permitted the start of the first academic year in 2002–2003.

At its first commencement ceremony in June 2007, GUST conferred diplomas on approximately four hundred graduates.

== Admissions and registration ==
=== Admissions ===
University rankings

Global – Overall
- QS World: 901-950 (2026)

Admission to GUST is on a competitive basis. Applicants are reviewed based on high school performance and achievement on the GUST English and Mathematics Placement Tests. Applicants are encouraged to submit the results of a Test of English as a Foreign Language (TOEFL). Test scores must be no more than two years old at the time of application. Students who do not have a valid TOEFL score must take the GUST English Placement Test.

== Academic services ==
=== Scholarships and student employment ===
- Kuwait Ministry of Higher Education (Private Universities Council) Scholarships
- GUST Scholarships
- GUST Summer Scholarship (for Study at UMSL)
- Student Employment

=== Center for Career Services and Alumni (CCSA) ===
The Center of Career Services and Alumni provides career-planning services to GUST students and alumni.

=== GUST Library ===
GUST library was established in 2002 to serve the university faculty, staff, students, and alumni. In January 2024, the library was named GUST Library. The library was formerly named the Abdullah Mubarak Al-Refai (A. M. Al-Refai) Library (2006-2023).

The library give access to books, e-books, e-journals, media materials, open access resources, and bibliographic/full-text databases. The library has a collection of over 24,500 book titles, 57,122 unique scholarly journals, 489,214 unique e-Books, curated open access resources, and 30 subscription databases.

Study areas and three discussion rooms are provided. Wireless network access is available throughout the library. There are 80 computer workstations for research and to access information. Eight printers are available in black/white and color.

The following services are available for the GUST community users: Borrowing service, information and reference service, library instruction and information literacy, access to the online library catalog, and the electronic resources available on the library website.

The library provides off-campus access to its subscribed digital resources only to enrolled students, faculty, and staff.

=== Multimedia Educational Unit ===
The unit is involved in the following activities: Digital imaging, video and audio, screen and interface design, website design, animation, as well as graphic design, including design of brochures, publications, booklets, logos, posters, illustrations and diagrams.

== Office of Student Affairs ==
The Office of Student Affairs (OSA) supports the educational and personal development of students at GUST and to encourage students’ personal growth. OSA is a main source of information regarding university policies and procedures that can affect students’ university lives.

=== GUST athletics ===
GUST offers athletic programs for men and women in the following sports:

- Men football (soccer) and GUST women football (soccer)
- Men handball
- Men volleyball and GUST women volleyball
- Men and women tennis
- Men and women table tennis
- Men and women basketball
- Men squash

The Falcons won the 4th annual UCC 2009 tournament organized every year between university teams.

=== GUST Music Club ===
The music club is composed of a group of students who play instruments including the oud, guitar, tabla, piano, drums, organ and violin. GUST Music Club has performed oriental, classical and traditional pieces for the GUST and larger Kuwaiti community. The GUST Music Club also took part in the activities of the Halla February festival and performed at GUST commencement celebrations.

=== GUST Art Club ===
The art club offers non-credit classes to GUST students with an interest in developing their artistic abilities. Classes include painting (gauche, water color, acrylic and oil), drawing and painting (on glass, ceramic, silk and wood), sketching, and decoupage. All classes are given in the North Campus. Materials and equipment are provided by GUST.

The club organizes annual art exhibitions for students and university staff, and has participated in off-campus art exhibitions including the Kuwaiti Art Association Exhibition, the Youth and Sports Ministry Exhibition, Al-Qurain Exhibition and the National Assembly Exhibition.

=== GUST IT Club ===
IT Club strengthens camaraderie among GUST students by providing activities that will help them improve their skills in technical areas relevant to the IT field.

== College of Arts & Sciences ==
The College of Arts and Sciences has five departments:

- Department of Computer Science
- Department of English
  - English, Linguistics-Translation
  - English Literature
  - English Education
- Department of Humanities and Social Sciences
- Department of Mass Communication and Multimedia
- Department Of Mathematics & Natural Sciences

== College of Business Administration ==
- Undergraduate Degree Programs

The College of Business Administration comprises four departments: Accounting, Business Administration, Economics and Finance, and Management Information Systems (MIS), and six degree programs. GUST students are able to major in business fields including:

  - Accounting
  - Business Administration with emphasis in one of the following areas:
  - International Business
  - Management and Organizational Behavior
  - Marketing
  - Finance
  - Management Information Systems
- Graduate Degree Programs
  - Master's Degree in Business Administration

== Notable alumni ==
- Omar Al-Tabtabaee
- Ali Najim
- Abdullah Al-Salloum
- Abdulwahab Al-Rushaid

== Campus facilities and services ==
=== Buildings and grounds ===
The first phase of the Mishref campus was completed in 2007 and accommodates up to 3,400 students. Later phases will expand the University to accommodate more than 5,500 students. In Phase 2, the concourse will be extended for additional classrooms and other facilities including a multi-story structured parking garage.

=== The concourse ===
The three-story concourse runs north-south [N1] and east-west [W1] and is accessed from the two parking areas and central VIP entrance. It provides covered access to all academic and social activities and is considered a focal point for gathering, information and social interaction.

=== Ground floor ===
The Office of Admissions and Registration, Student Information Services (SIS), Public Relations and Marketing, and the University Library are located near the VIP entrance. Also close to the VIP entrance are two 125 seat lecture theaters available for teaching as well as for small-scale special presentations. Prayer rooms are located near the main entrances.

=== Parking and campus access ===
Limited covered parking is available for students near the north and west entrances. Part of the north parking lot is reserved for faculty and staff during regular university working hours. Other non-covered parking is also available. Access to the campus is provided from two main gates by smart cards, and a license plate recognition system.

=== Sports facilities ===
The Physical Fitness and Health Center is connected to the north concourse at the ground and the first levels. The facility includes a 25 m indoor swimming pool with an overlooking seating area for special events. It contains an indoor basketball and volleyball court with seating area and digital score board.

=== Professional Advancement and Continuing Education ===
GUST's Professional Advancement and Continuing Education (PACE) is connected to the main concourse. The center provides conference and training facilities for the community. It consists of two auditoria, one with 500 seats and one with 200 seats, with committee rooms and space for exhibitions and events.

== Technology at GUST ==
The IT infrastructure has adopted Category 7 cable technology. Every seat in every classroom, laboratory and auditorium has a hard-wired connection to the internet. The wireless internet environment is provided throughout the buildings and external landscaped courtyards. By means of the IT set-up, faculty are able to control both the teaching media and the environmental conditions. The IT system also supports building management and security facilities throughout the campus.

Computer laboratories

There are six computer laboratories located throughout the campus. These labs contain a variety of hardware, including printing and scanning capabilities, academic software, and high-speed access to the internet. A fiber optic networking infrastructure supports the computer labs and provides wireless network connectivity.

Information Technology Department Support Services

The Information Technology Department Support Services Division provides technical support for GUST students, faculty, and staff. The division maintains the computer labs and network and determines the GUST IT hardware and software requirements. It manages the GUST network security systems, oversees the wireless network system, and provides user accounts and e-mail services.

== See also ==
- List of universities in Kuwait
