= Philip Treleaven =

British computer scientist (born 1950)

- Born: 1950 (age 75–76); Cornwall, UK
- Education: University of Manchester (MSc, PhD)
- Known for: Data-flow computers; Algorithmic trading; RegTech regulation; SizeUK National sizing survey; Tech entrepreneurship
- Scientific career
- Fields: Computer design; Financial computing; RegTech automation; 3D body scanning
- Workplaces: University College London
- Thesis: Data-Driven & Demand-Driven Computer Architecture

Philip Colic Treleaven (born 1950) is a British computer scientist and engineer.

== Early life and education ==
Treleaven was born in 1950 in western England. He studied computer science at the University of Manchester, where he earned his PhD.

== Career and research ==
Treleaven's research has covered computer architecture, financial computing, regulation technology, and entrepreneurship.

His early work on dataflow computer architectures informed later developments in field-programmable gate arrays (FPGAs). His later research includes DNA-programmable biological microcomputers, and computation as a fundamental science.

He has advised on innovation programs including the European Commission ESPRIT programme, Japan's Fifth Generation computer project, and initiatives in Korea, Singapore, and Thailand. He also chaired the Luxembourg Research Council (FNR) FinTech panel.

Treleaven founded the University College London (UCL) Financial Computing Research Group. His team developed one of the first insider dealing detection systems for the London Stock Exchange and early fraud detection systems. He co-developed algorithmic trading platforms in Europe and the Ki-Insurance underwriting platform. He directed the UK Doctoral Training Centre in Financial Computing, which graduated over 230 PhDs.

He worked with the UK Financial Conduct Authority (FCA) on technology for regulatory automation, including Tech Sprints and the Sandbox program, and is credited with introducing the term "RegTech".

In 2000, Treleaven directed the UK National Sizing Survey (SizeUK), which used 3D body scanners to measure 11,000 UK adults for clothing size data. The survey reported a 30 cm increase in average women's waist size over 20 years.

At UCL he introduced the first technology entrepreneurship course in 1995 and has co-founded several start-ups. More recently he has worked on applications of AI for education and social programmes, as well as federated computing infrastructures.
