= Naji al-Ali =

Palestinian political cartoonist (1938 – 1987)

Naji al-Ali ناجي العلي
- Born: Naji Salim Hussain Al-Ali c. 1938; Al-Shajara, Mandatory Palestine
- Died: 29 August 1987 (aged 48–49); London, England
- Occupation: Political cartoonist
- Writing career
- Years active: 1960–1987

Naji Salim Hussain Al-Ali (Arabic: ناجي سليم حسين العلي, romanized: Nājī Salīm Ḥusayn al-‘Alī; c. 1938 – 29 August 1987) was a Palestinian political cartoonist, noted for the political criticism of the Arab and Israeli regimes in his works. Al-Ali is best known as the creator of the character Handala, a personification of the Palestinian people that has become a prominent symbol of Palestinian nationalism and resistance.

One of the best-known cartoonists in the Arab world, and celebrated as the greatest Palestinian cartoon artist, Al-Ali drew over 40,000 cartoons, often reflecting Palestinian and Arab public opinion and offering sharply critical commentaries on Palestinian and Arab politics and political leaders. On 22 July 1987, while outside the London offices of al-Qabas, a Kuwaiti newspaper for which he drew political caricatures, Al-Ali was shot in the neck and mortally wounded. He died five weeks later in Charing Cross Hospital.

== Early life ==
Al-Ali was born in 1938 or thereabouts in the northern Palestinian village of Al-Shajara, located between Tiberias and Nazareth (now subsumed by Ilaniya). He lived as an exile in the south of Lebanon with his family after the 1948 Palestinian expulsion and flight, the Nakba, and lived in Ain al-Hilweh refugee camp near Sidon, where he attended the Union of Christian Churches school. After graduation, he worked in the orchards of Sidon, then moved to Tripoli where he attended the White Friars' vocational school for two years.

Al-Ali then moved to Beirut, where he lived in a tent in Shatila refugee camp and worked in various industrial jobs. In 1957, after qualifying as a car mechanic, he traveled to Saudi Arabia, where he worked for two years.

== Career as a cartoonist and journalist ==
In 1959 Al-Ali returned to Lebanon, and that year he joined the Arab Nationalist Movement (ANM), but was expelled four times within one year for lack of party discipline. Between 1960 and 1961, along with comrades from the ANM, he published a handwritten political journal Al-Sarkha ('the scream').

In 1960, he entered the Lebanese Academy of Fine Arts, but was unable to continue his studies there as he was imprisoned for political reasons soon afterwards. After his release he moved to Tyre, where he worked as a drawing instructor in the Ja'fariya College.

The writer and political activist Ghassan Kanafani saw some of Al-Ali's cartoons on a visit to Ain al-Hilweh and printed the artist's first published drawings along with an accompanying article in issue 88 of Al-Hurriya, dated 25 September 1961.

In 1963 Al-Ali moved to Kuwait, hoping to save money to study art in Cairo or Rome. There he worked as an editor, cartoonist, designer and newspaper producer on the Arab nationalist Al Tali'a magazine. From 1968 on he worked for Al-Siyasa. In the course of these years he returned to Lebanon several times. In 1974 he started working for the Lebanese newspaper Al-Safir, which permitted him to return to Lebanon for a longer period. During the Israeli invasion of Lebanon in 1982, he was briefly detained by the occupying forces along with other residents of Ain al-Hilweh. In 1983 he once more moved to Kuwait to work for Al Qabas and in 1985 moved to London where he worked for its international edition until his death.

In 1984 he was described by The Guardian as "the nearest thing there is to an Arab public opinion".

== Work, positions and awards ==
In his career as a political cartoonist, Al-Ali produced over 40,000 drawings. They generally deal with the situation of the Palestinian people, depicting suffering and resistance and harshly criticizing the Israeli state and Israeli occupation, Palestinian leadership, and the Arab regimes.

Al-Ali published three books of his cartoons, in 1976, 1983 and 1985, and was preparing another at the time of his death.

In 1979, Al-Ali was elected president of the League of Arab Cartoonists. In 1979 and 1980, he received the first prize in the Arab cartoonists exhibitions held in Damascus. The International Federation of Newspaper Publishers awarded him the "Golden Pen of Freedom" posthumously in 1988.

== Handala ==
Handala, the Palestinian defiance symbol

Handala, also known as Handhala (Arabic: حنظلة), is the most famous of Al-Ali's characters. He is depicted as a ten-year-old boy, and appeared for the first time in Al-Siyasa in Kuwait in 1969. The figure turned his back to the viewer from the year 1973, and clasped his hands behind his back. The artist explained that the ten-year-old represented his age when forced to leave Palestine and would not grow up until he could return to his homeland; his turned back and clasped hands symbolised the character's rejection of "outside solutions". Handala wears ragged clothes and is barefoot, symbolising his allegiance to the poor. In later cartoons, he is actively participating in the action depicted, not merely observing it. The artist vows that his figure, Handala, will "reveal his face to the readers again only when Palestinian refugees return to their homeland".

Handala became the signature of Al-Ali's cartoons and remains an iconic symbol of Palestinian identity and defiance. Handala has also been used as the web mascot of the Iranian Green Movement. The artist remarked that "He was the arrow of the compass, pointing steadily towards Palestine. Not just Palestine in geographical terms, but Palestine in its humanitarian sense—the symbol of a just cause, whether it is located in Egypt, Vietnam or South Africa."

== Other characters and motifs ==
Other characters in Al-Ali's cartoons include a thin, miserable-looking man representing the Palestinian as the defiant victim of Israeli oppression and other hostile forces, and a fat man representing the Arab regimes and Palestinian political leaders who led an easy life and engaged in political compromises which the artist fervently opposed. The motifs of the crucifixion (representing Palestinian suffering) and stone-throwing (representing the resistance of ordinary Palestinians) are also common in his work.

== Assassination ==
An unidentified shooter opened fire on Al-Ali outside the London office of Kuwaiti newspaper Al Qabas in Ives Street on 22 July 1987, hitting him in the back and neck. The gun used in the murder, a 7.62 Tokarev pistol, was only found on the Hallfield Estate in Paddington by police nearly two years later, on 22 April 1989. Al-Ali was subsequently taken to hospital and remained in a coma until his death on 29 August 1987. Although his will requested that he be buried in Ain al-Hilweh beside his father, this proved impossible to arrange and he was buried in Brookwood Islamic Cemetery outside London.

In 1987, the Metropolitan Police arrested suspect Ismail Sowan, a 28-year-old Jerusalem-born Palestinian researcher at Hull University, and found a cache of weapons and explosives in his apartment that they believed were intended for terrorist attacks around Europe. Initially, police officials said Sowan was a member of the PLO, which denied any involvement. Later investigation by the London police revealed that Sowan had been working as a double agent, having been recruited by the Israeli secret service Mossad to infiltrate a PLO cell known as Force 17. He was found to have seemingly been successful in this role, even serving as best man at the wedding of the cell’s leader. Sowan admitted to being a double agent but denied being the shooter. He claimed that he had been trying to distance himself from Force 17 by the time of the murder, and that the weapons and explosives found at his home were delivered to him in locked briefcases by the cell's leader. A second suspect arrested by Scotland Yard also admitted to being a Mossad double agent, and it was later confirmed that Mossad had two double agents working in London-based PLO hit teams and had advance knowledge of the killing. Sowan denied direct involvement and implicated Force 17, but the involvement of undercover Mossad agents that knew of the plan triggered speculation that Israeli intelligence may have been the culprit behind the assassination.

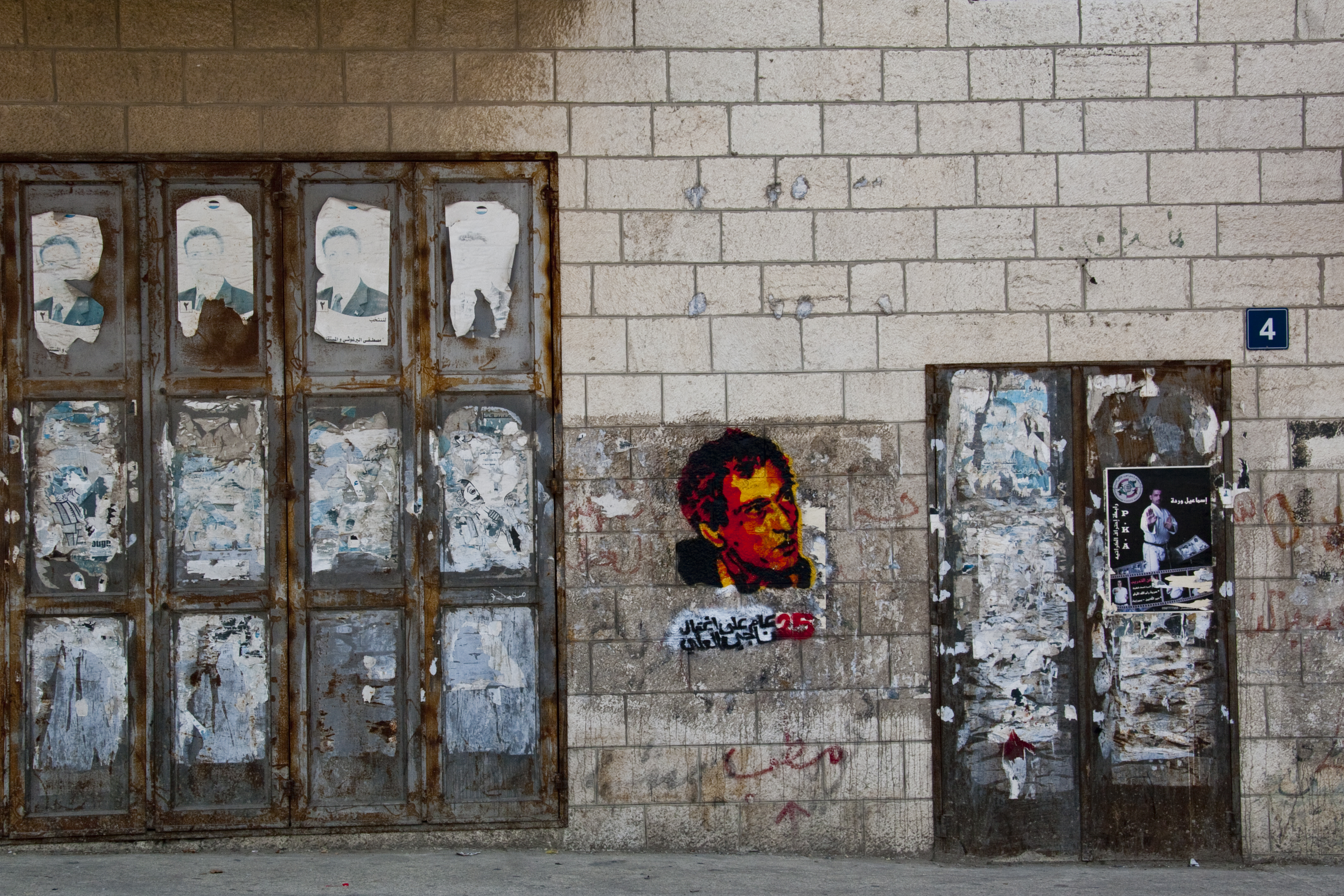
Graffiti depicting Naji al-Ali in Ramallah, 2012

By refusing to pass on the relevant information to their British counterparts in MI5, including that there was a cache of weapons and explosives lying in an apartment they were personally paying the rent on, Mossad angered the third Thatcher ministry, which retaliated by expelling a five-man Mossad cell as well as two or three Israeli diplomats, one of whom was the embassy attaché identified as the handler for the two agents. All known members of the PLO's Force 17 residing in the UK were also expelled. Margaret Thatcher, who was reportedly furious, ordered Mossad's London base in Palace Green, Kensington to be closed. Sowan was found guilty of illegal possession of firearms and was jailed for 11 years. The international response to these actions was noted in transcripts of a June 1988 UK cabinet meeting: "The Israeli reaction has been muted; indeed they had reportedly expected a more severe penalty. Nor had there been any undue excitement on the parts of Arab governments about the action against the PLO."

Ultimately, the case remains unresolved. In August 2017, detectives relaunched an investigation into his murder case, 30 years after his death.

=== Commemorative statue ===
Naji statue when it was first erected (right), exploded and damaged, and then re-erected

A statue of Al-Ali by the sculptor Charbel Faris was erected at the northern entrance of Ain al-Hilweh camp, where Naji was raised for most of his youth.

Work on the fiberglass and colored polyester statue (with a steel inner support) took around five months. When finished, it was 275 centimetres (9.02 ft) tall, with an average width of 85 centimetres (33 in), and average thickness of 45 centimetres (18 in). The statue holds a rock in its right hand and a booklet of drawings in the left hand.

Shortly after being completed, the statue was damaged in an explosion caused by unknown assailants; like Al-Ali the statue was shot in the left eye. The statue was repaired and re-erected and was soon destroyed again.

== Media ==
A film was made about the life of Al-Ali in Egypt, with the Egyptian actor Nour El-Sherif playing the lead role.

== See also ==
- Omaya Joha
