= Sultan of Najd =

2020 novel by Abdullah Al-Salloum

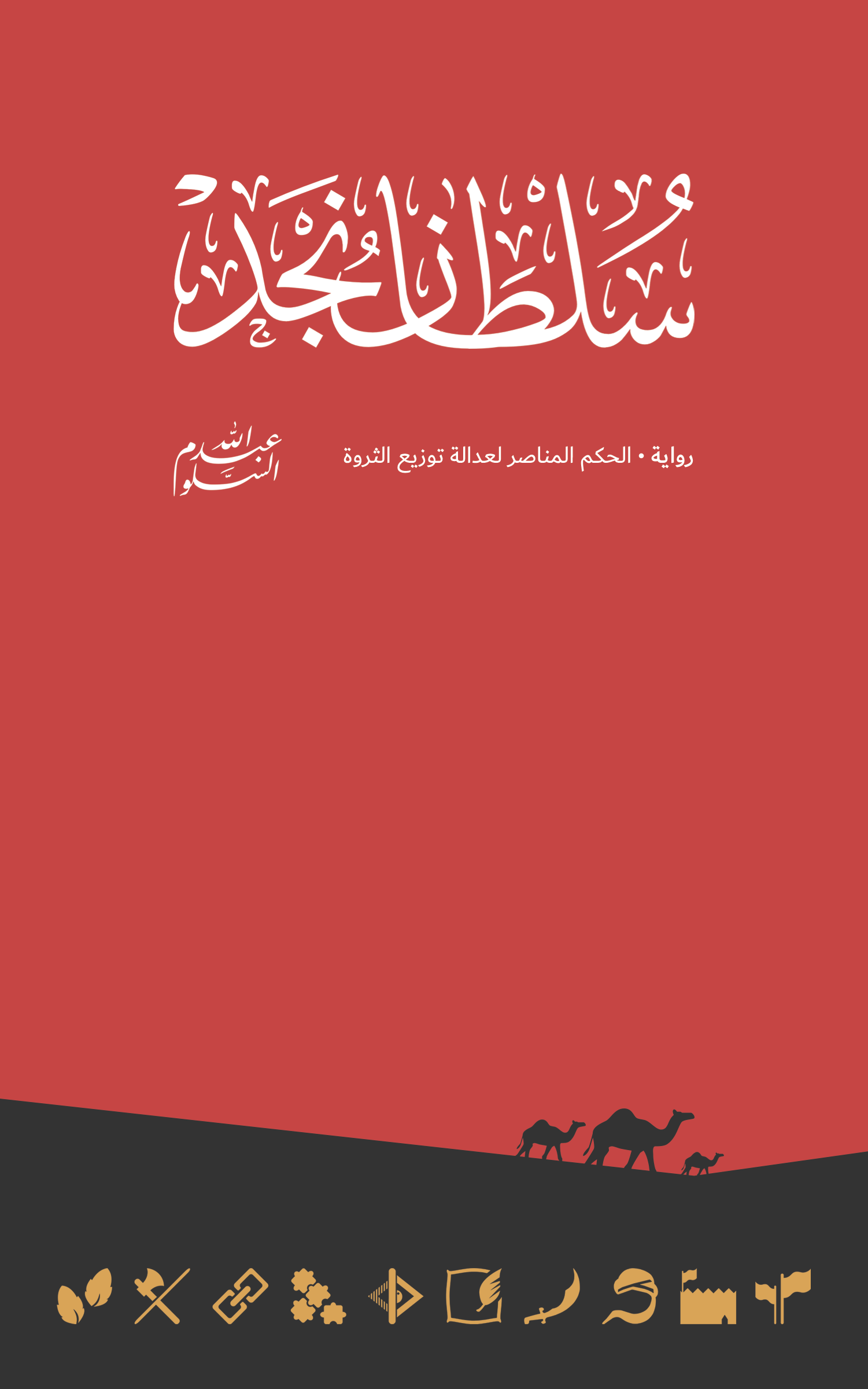
- The throne advocating for fair wealth distribution.
- Author: Abdullah Al-Salloum
- Language: Arabic
- Genre: Political economic fiction
- Publication date: 20 August 2020
- Publication place: Kuwajt
- Media type: Book (print), and e-book (.epub, .mobi)
- Pages: 252
- ISBN: 978-1732537569

Sultan of Najd (Arabic: سلطان نجد) is a political economic novel by Abdullah Al-Salloum. The novel, subtitled The throne advocating for fair wealth distribution (Arabic: الحكم المناصر لعدالة توزيع الثروة), interprets – within the ancient Ukhaydhariya State – a series of events that exposed what was unknown by the throne, not only within the monetary scope, but the state politics, where the Emir is introduced to reforming schemes meant to achieve the state’s sustainability. The title was ranked the third bestseller on Amazon's Arabic Literature and Fiction category.
