= Yousuf Saleh Alyan =

Kuwaiti businessman

Yousuf Saleh AlOlayan
- AlOlayan before his demise in December 2007
- Born: 12 September 1932; Kuwait
- Died: 5 December 2007 (aged 75); Kuwait
- Occupation: Businessman

Yousuf Saleh AlOlayan (Arabic: يوسف صالح العليان) was a Kuwaiti businessman. He was the founder, publisher and chief editor of the Kuwait Times, the first daily newspaper in the Persian Gulf region. In addition, his establishment went on to become the region's first English language newspaper.

AlOlayan was also one of the founding members of the Kuwait Journalists Association (KJA), and served as its honorary chairperson from 1978 to 1985 and again from 1990 to 1992. Following the Gulf War, he also went on to become editor-in-chief of the Al-Fajir Al-Jadeed newspaper between 1991 and 1992.

One of only a few Kuwaitis to travel to Europe in the mid twentieth century, AlOlayan studied economics in London and was awarded his degree in 1955. Later, he became a diplomatic agent to the Saudi Arabian government in France, before returning home to form the Kuwait Times in September 1961.

AlOlayan was fluent in many languages, including Arabic, English, French, Italian and Persian.
