= Kuwait of the Sustainability =

Political economic book

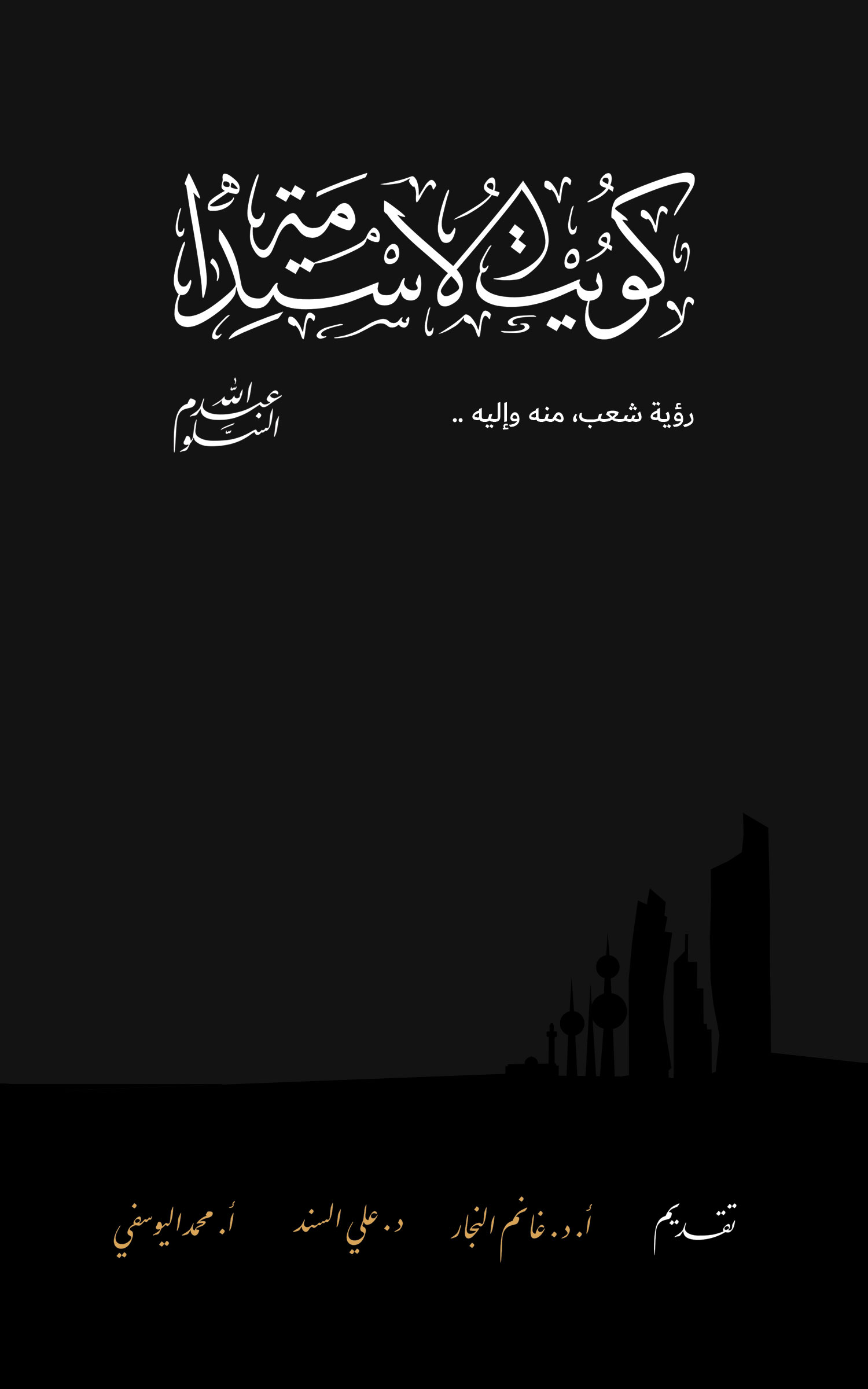
- Author: Abdullah Al-Salloum
- Language: Arabic
- Genre: Economics
- Publication date: 20 November 2018
- Publication place: Kuwait
- Media type: Book (paperback) and e-book (.epub).
- Pages: 182
- ISBN: 978-1-732-53753-8

Kuwait of the Sustainability (Arabic: كويت الاستدامة) is a political economic book by Abdullah Al-Salloum. The book, subtitled "Vision of a people, from and to them." (Arabic: رؤية شعب، منه وإليه), ISBN 978-1732537538, extensively highlights the Kuwaiti economy in particular, aiming at clarifying the concept of sound economic vision through radical solutions targeting macro-economic issues of the state.

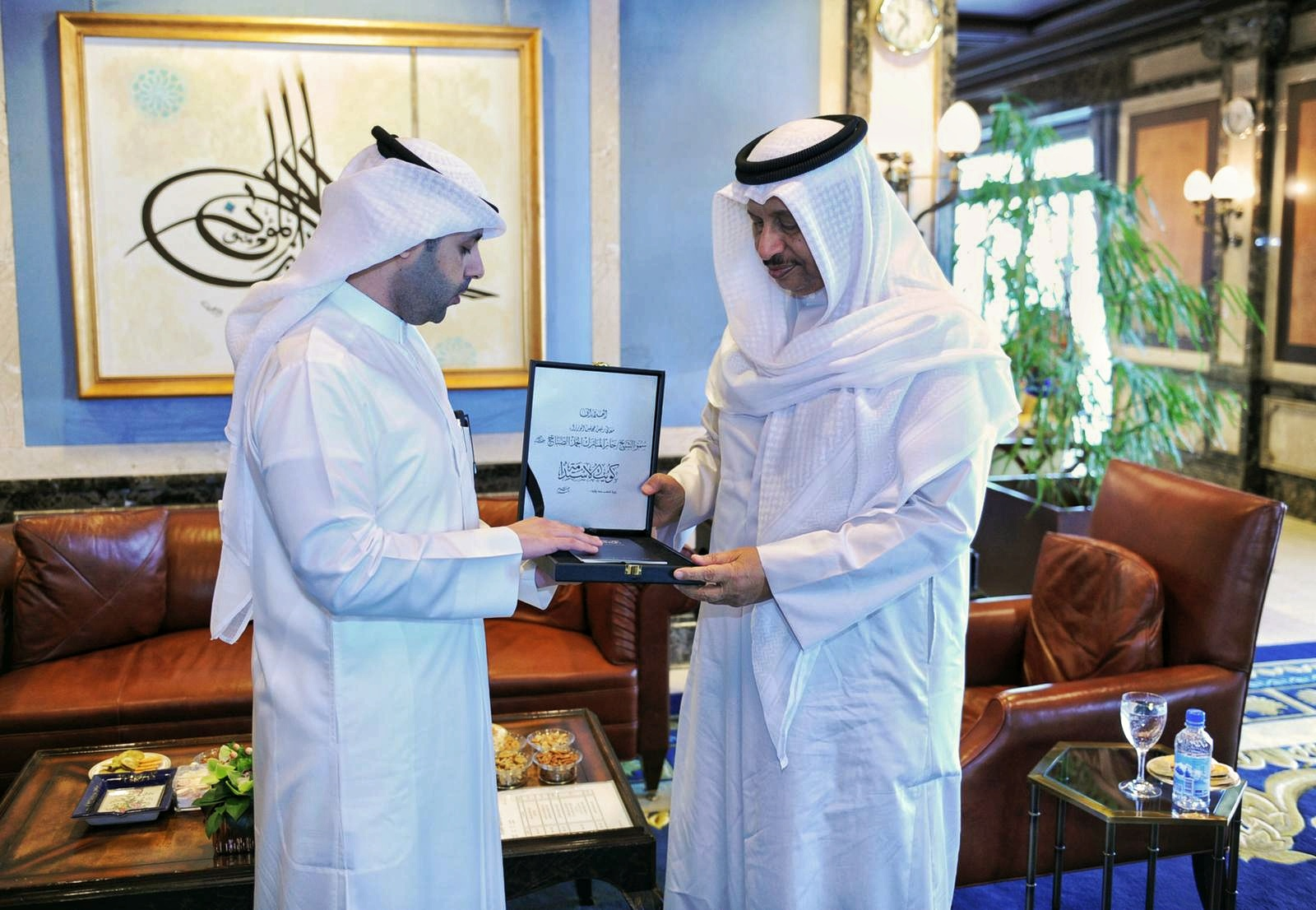
Abdullah Al-Salloum presenting the vision to the Prime Minister of Kuwait, Sheikh Jaber Al-Mubarak Al-Sabah.

In this title, which is introduced with appraisals by Prof. Ghanim Al-Najjar – the political science professor at Kuwait University –, Ali Al-Sanad, Ph.D. – the Islamic studies professor at the General Authority for Applied Education and Training –, and Mr. Mohammed Al-Yousifi – the historical researcher and political analyst –, the author looks forward to raise the awareness of the economic sense; in a way that makes individuals see and understand the consequences of political and administrative decision-making outcomes, build their own view and critical opinion while being fully aware of the subject matter.

The title concludes that moving Kuwait from rent to sustainability requires a major reform at the macro-economic level, a reform whose impact would wipe all political, organizational behavioral, and micro-economic obstacles facing the state.
