= Ali Najim =

Kuwaiti radio personality (born 1989)

Ali Najem
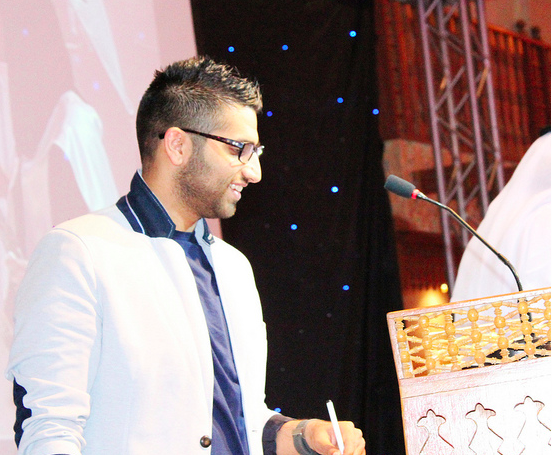
- Ali hosting on stage.
- Born: Ali Najem; March 25, 1989 (age 37); Kuwait
- Occupation: Neuro Linguistic Programming Doctor radio personality producer director
- Years active: 2006–present
- Website: https://www.twitter.com/alinajim

Ali Najem AlQumani (Arabic: علي نجم القوماني, born 25 March 1989) is a Kuwaiti radio personality who is a former producer and director for Marina FM radio station in Kuwait.

== Early life ==
Ali was born on March 25, 1989, in Kuwait. Ali graduated from AlAsmaei high school, in Qortoba. After high school Ali went to university, Gust University and graduated 2012 where he majored in English Translation and Linguistics.

== Career ==
AIi has worked in several shows including, Night show with Eman Najem, Refresh, Jidder w Gha6awi show, El7ajiya wain? (Where is Hajiya?), and Bu Chandal Mino? (Who's Buchandal?).

== Blackberry ==
Starting from October 2012, Ali is Kuwait's official ambassador for Blackberry.

== Directed, hosted ==
Ali directed "Balanty Show" for 3 months which was a Football show. Hosted "Balanty Show" for 2 weeks, and hosted and Directed "Nagham Alsaba7" for 2 weeks.
