= The Currency of Mount Serenity =

2017 novel by Abdullah Al-Salloum

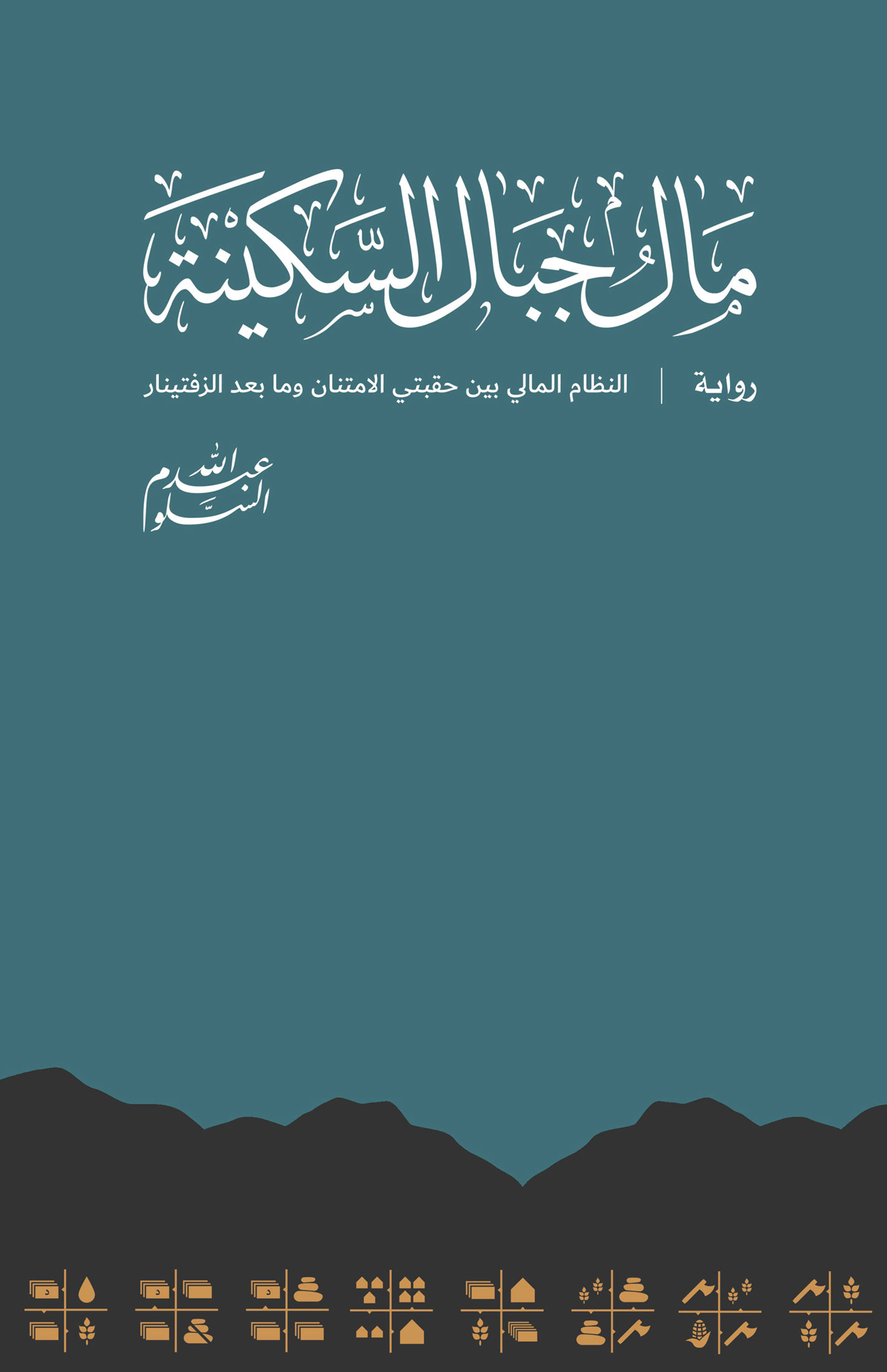
- The monetary system: from favor to post-tar-inar eras.
- Author: Abdullah Al-Salloum
- Language: Arabic
- Genre: Political economic novel
- Publication date: 10 July 2017
- Publication place: Kuwait
- Media type: Book (print), e-book (.epub) and audible (.mp3)
- Pages: 246
- ISBN: 978-9996617980

The Currency of Mount Serenity (Arabic: مال جبال السكينة) is a political economic novel by Abdullah Al-Salloum. The novel (Subtitled: The monetary system: from favor to post-tar-inar eras - Arabic: النظام المالي بين حقبتي الامتنان وما بعد الزفتينار) (deposit: 0988-2017 Kuwait National Library) interprets – in a virtual world – the historic development eras of the real monetary system. The title was ranked as best-seller on Jamalon; middle-east's largest online books retailer.
