= Dhammin =

Teams application

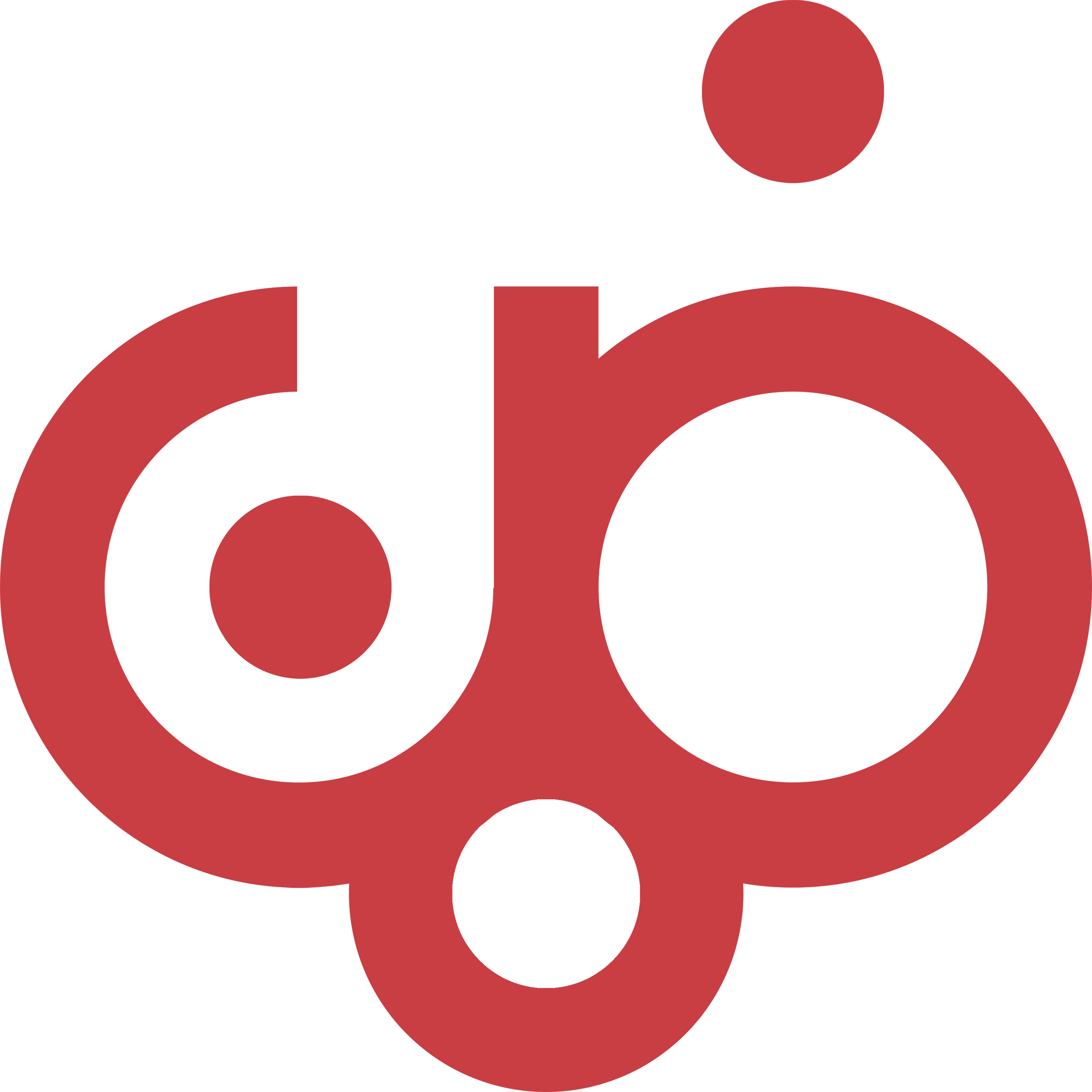
- Platform logo
- Developer(s): Abdullah Al-Salloum
- Written in: PHP, JavaScript, Objective-C, Java
- Operating system: iOS, Android, UNIX, macOS, Microsoft Windows
- Type: Political Campaign Management
- Website: dhammin.com

Dhammin (Arabic: ضمّن) is a political platform that manages candidates' electoral campaigns for the National Assembly, Municipal Council or Cooperative Society councils of Kuwait. The platform was founded by Abdullah Al-Salloum and it is, according to news reports and interviews, the first within the field to apply distributed-systems' methodologies.
