= Kingdom of the Vision =

Economic Book

Kingdom Of The Vision
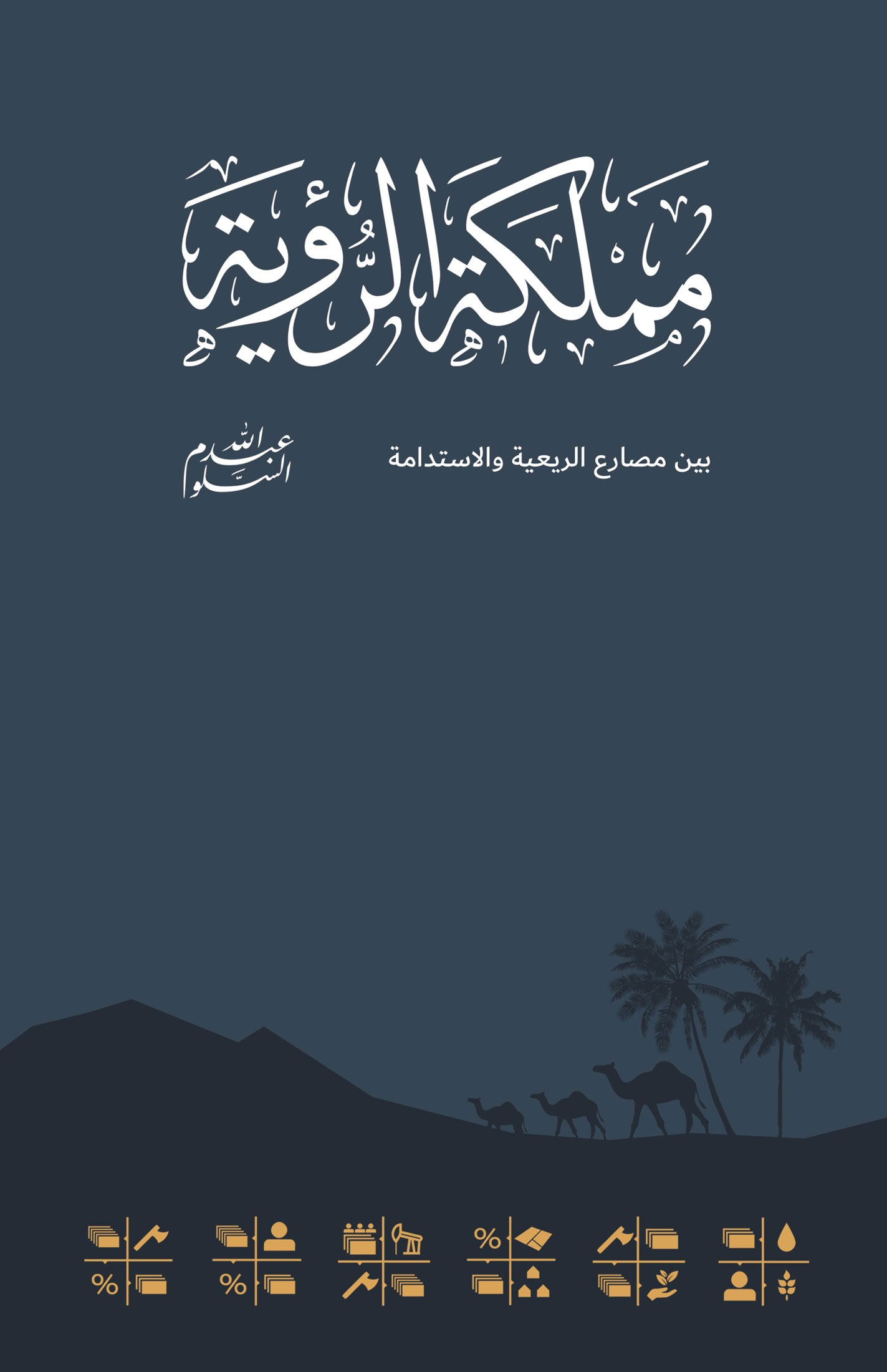
- Author: Abdullah Al-Salloum
- Language: Arabic
- Genre: Economics
- Publication date: 20 July 2018
- Publication place: Kuwait
- Media type: Book (paperback) and e-book (.epub).
- Pages: 204
- ISBN: 978-0-692-14486-2

Kingdom of the Vision (Arabic: مملكة الرؤية) is an economics book by Abdullah Al-Salloum. The book, subtitled "Within the Conflicts of Sustainability and Rent" (Arabic: بين مصارع الريعية والاستدامة), ISBN 978-0692144862, extensively elaborates on Saudi Arabia's Vision 2030; linking its strategy to macroeconomics theories. The title was ranked as best-seller on Jamalon – the Middle-East's largest online book retailer –, Jarir Reader – Middle-East's largest e-book store –, and Amazon's Arabic books category.
