= Kuwait Information Technology Society =

- الجمعية الكويتية لتقنية المعلومات
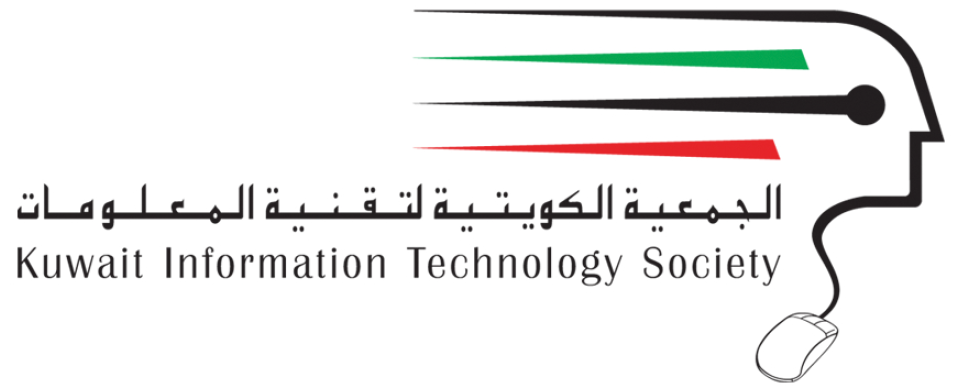
- Formation: March 7, 1982; 44 years ago
- Type: Public-benefit organization
- Purpose: Information Technology field-related support and consultation.
- Location: Kuwait
- Website: kits.org.kw

Kuwait Information Technology Society – KITS – (Arabic: الجمعية الكويتية لتقنية المعلومات) is a public-benefit organization that was established on March 7, 1982, in Kuwait. The organization is managed by an elected board to provide integrated support and consultation to governmental and non-governmental institutions in the fields of information technology as well as to participate and organize field-related competitions local events.
