= David Tal (historian) =

Israeli historian and professor (born c. 1964)

David Tal (Hebrew: דוד טל; born c. 1964) is an Israeli historian and professor. Since 2009, he has been the Kahanoff Chair in Israeli Studies at the University of Calgary. He is an expert on Israel's security and diplomatic history, as well as U.S. disarmament policy.

== Biography ==
Tal completed all his undergraduate and graduate degrees in history at Tel Aviv University, receiving his BA in 1986, MA in 1990, and Ph.D. in 1995. He was an instructor in the Department of History at Tel Aviv University from 1994 to 1996 and a lecturer in the Program of Security Studies from 1996 to 2005. He was a NATO Research Fellow from 2000 to 2002.

Since 2005, Tal has been a visiting professor at Emory University (2005–2006, 2008–2009) and Syracuse University (2006–2008). In 2009, he joined the Department of History at the University of Calgary as the Kahanoff Chair in Israeli Studies (2009–2014). In 2014, he moved to the University of Sussex, UK, where he is holding the Yossi Harel Chair in Modern Israel Studies.

== Selected bibliography ==
=== Books ===
- Tal, David (1993). Hezbollah, Palestinian Jihad Islamic and Hamas. Tel Aviv. (with Anat Kurz and Maskit Burgin)
- Tal, David (1998). Israel's Day-to-Day Security Conception: Its origin and development, 1949–1956 (in Hebrew). Beersheba University Press.
- Tal, David (13 July 2001). The 1956 War: Collusion and rivalry in the Middle East. London: Routledge. ISBN 0-7146-4840-X.
- Tal, David (15 March 2003). War in Palestine, 1948: Strategy and diplomacy. London: Routledge. ISBN 978-0-7146-5275-7.
- Tal, David (31 October 2008). The American Nuclear Disarmament Dilemma, 1945-1963. Syracuse University Press. ISBN 978-0-8156-3166-8.
- Tal, David (Ed.) (2013). Israel identity: between Orient and Occident
- Tal, David (8 May 2017). US strategic arms policy in the Cold War: negotiation and confrontation over SALT, 1969–79
- Tal, David (2022). The Making of an Alliance The Origins and Development of the US-Israel Relationship

=== Articles ===
- Tal, David (1995). "The American-Israeli Security Treaty: Sequel or means to the relief of Israeli-Arab tension, 1954–1955". Middle Eastern Studies 31:4, pp. 828–848.
- Tal, David (February 1996). "Israel's Road to the 1956 War". International Journal of Middle East Studies, 67.
- Tal, David (1998). "Israel's Conception of Routine Security Measures". Ben Gurion University of the Negev.
- Tal, David (June 2000). "Symbol or Substance? Israel's campaign for U.S. Hawk missiles, 1960–1962". International History Review, 22:2.
- Tal, David (Spring/Summer 2000). "The Forgotten War: The Jewish-Palestinian strife in Palestine, December 1947–May 1948". Israel Affairs, 6:3–4.
- Tal, David (July 2004). "Between Intuition and Professionalism: Israeli Military Leadership during the 1948 Palestine War". The Journal of Military History. 68 (3): 885–909. doi:10.1353/jmh.2004.0147. S2CID 159891562.
- Tal, David (2004). "The Battle over Jerusalem: The Israeli-Jordanian War, 1948", in Alon Kadish (ed.), Israel's War of Independence Revisited (Tel Aviv: Ministry of Defense, 2004), pp. 307–339.
- Tal, David (Autumn 2005). "The 1948 War in Palestine Historiography: The missing dimension". Journal of Israeli History 24:2, pp. 183–202.
- Tal, David (Fall 2008). "From the Open Skies Proposal of 1955 to the Norstad Plan of 1960: A plan too far". Journal of Cold War Studies, 10:4, pp. 66–93.
- Tal, David (2009) "The making, operation and failure of the May 1950 tripartite declaration on Middle East security". British Journal of Middle Eastern Studies
- Tal, David (2011). David Ben Gurion's teleological westernism. University of Sussex. Journal contribution. https://hdl.handle.net/10779/uos.23399570.v1
- Tal, David (2013). 'Absolutes' and 'stages' in the making and application of Nixon's SALT policy. University of Sussex. Journal contribution. https://hdl.handle.net/10779/uos.23399561.v1
- Tal, David (2014). A tested alliance: the American airlift to Israel in the 1973 Yom Kippur War. University of Sussex. Journal contribution. https://hdl.handle.net/10779/uos.23409329.v1
- Tal, David (2015). What is new in the first Arab-Israeli war? A historiographical discussion. University of Sussex. Journal contribution. https://hdl.handle.net/10779/uos.23417750.v1
- Tal, David (2016). Who needed the October 1973 War?. University of Sussex. Journal contribution. https://hdl.handle.net/10779/uos.23427521.v2
- Tal, David (2017). Between politics and politics of identity: the case of the Arab Jews. University of Sussex. Journal contribution. https://hdl.handle.net/10779/uos.23428874.v1
- Tal, David (2018). Jacqueline Kahanoff and the demise of the Levantine. University of Sussex. Journal contribution. https://hdl.handle.net/10779/uos.23448995.v1
- Tal, David (2021). United States – Israel relations (1953–1957) revisited. University of Sussex. Journal contribution. https://hdl.handle.net/10779/uos.23474018.v1
- Tal, David (2023). Ronald Reagan and Menachem Begin: bridge across stormy waters. University of Sussex. Journal contribution. https://hdl.handle.net/10779/uos.23495093.v1
- Tal, David (2023). An arms deal as a bargaining chip: Israel and the AWACS deal. University of Sussex. Journal contribution. https://hdl.handle.net/10779/uos.23495150.v1
- Tal, David (2023). Kissinger's wrath: the reassessment of US-Israel relationship (March 1975). University of Sussex. Journal contribution. https://hdl.handle.net/10779/uos.24271066.v1
- Tal, David (2023). The Judeo - Christian tradition and the US-Israel special relationship. University of Sussex. Journal contribution. https://hdl.handle.net/10779/uos.23495471.v1
- Tal, David (2024). Between realism and idealism: trends and developments in the study of US-Israel relationship. University of Sussex. Journal contribution. https://hdl.handle.net/10779/uos.23495474.v1
- Tal, David (2026). The One Lonely Little Guy Versus Thousand Lobbyists: George H. W. Bush and the American Jews. University of Sussex. Journal contribution. https://doi.org/10.1111/psq.70049

=== Chapters ===
- Tal, David (2013). Israel in or of the Middle East. University of Sussex. Chapter. https://hdl.handle.net/10779/uos.23486915.v1
- Tal, David (2014). "Armament measures are not a cause, but a consequence: the legacy of Wilson and the nuclear disarmament policy of the United States"(translated from German). University of Sussex. Chapter. https://hdl.handle.net/10779/uos.23409785.v1
- Tal, David (2014). Civilian settlement: not designed to be a fortress of power. University of Sussex. Chapter. https://hdl.handle.net/10779/uos.23494979.v1
- Tal, David (2008). The 1956 Sinai war: a watershed in the history of the Arab-Israeli conflict. University of Sussex. Chapter. https://hdl.handle.net/10779/uos.23409200.v1
- Tal, David (2016). Paving the road to war: Israeli diplomacy and the 1967 crisis. University of Sussex. Chapter. https://hdl.handle.net/10779/uos.23495096.v1
- Tal, David (2021). Israel's Wars. University of Sussex. Chapter. https://hdl.handle.net/10779/uos.23475797.v1
