= Marina FM =

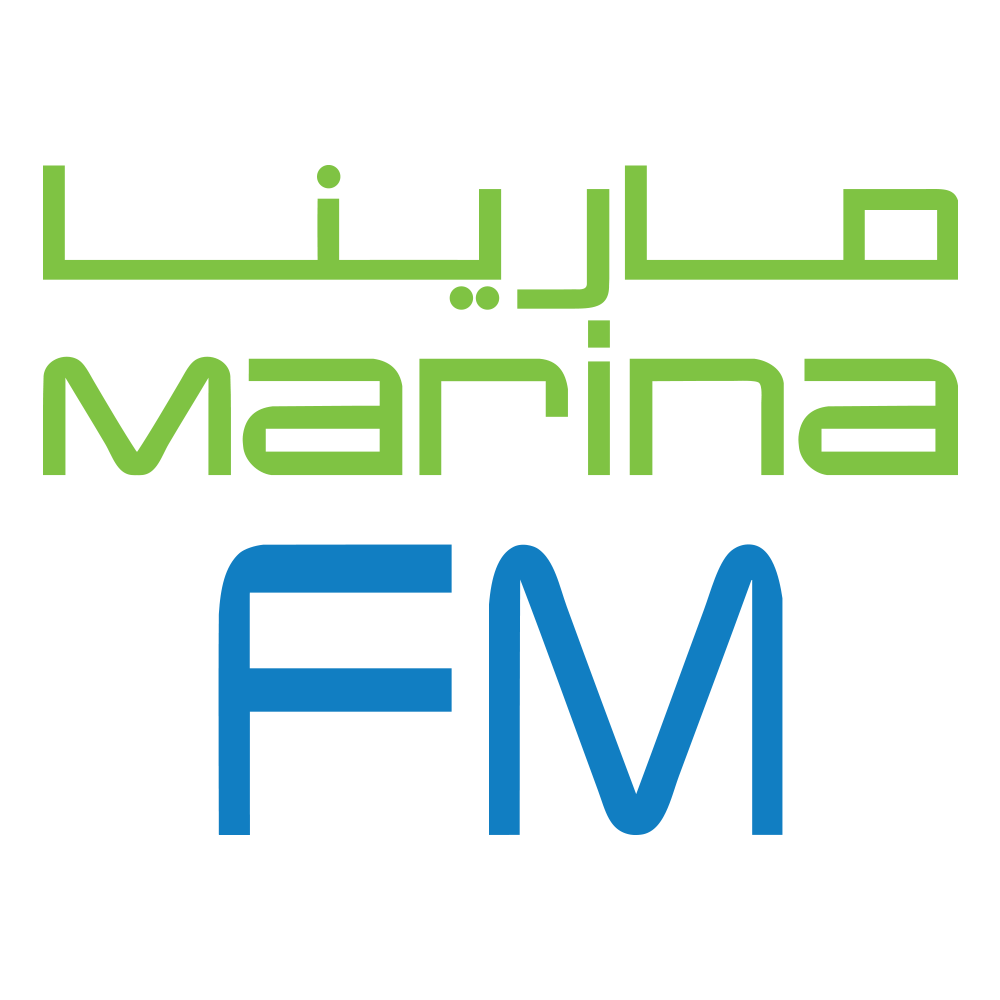
- Kuwait City; Kuwait
- Frequency: 90.4 MHz

Programming
- Affiliations: Marina FM

Ownership
- Owner: United Networks
- Sister stations: Marina TV

History
- First air date: April 1, 2005
- Last air date: 30 June 2026; 2 days ago
- Former frequencies: 88.8 MHz (2005–2016)

Technical information
- Power: 4.5 kW
- Transmitter coordinates: 29°22′06.1″N 47°58′29.6″E

Links
- Webcast: http://31.14.40.102:8006/stream.ogg
- Website: Marina FM

Marina FM or Marina Radio or Marina Station is the first private radio station in Kuwait at a frequency of 90.4 FM. Its studios are located on the second floor of the Marina Mall shopping centre, with windows overlooking the ground floor.

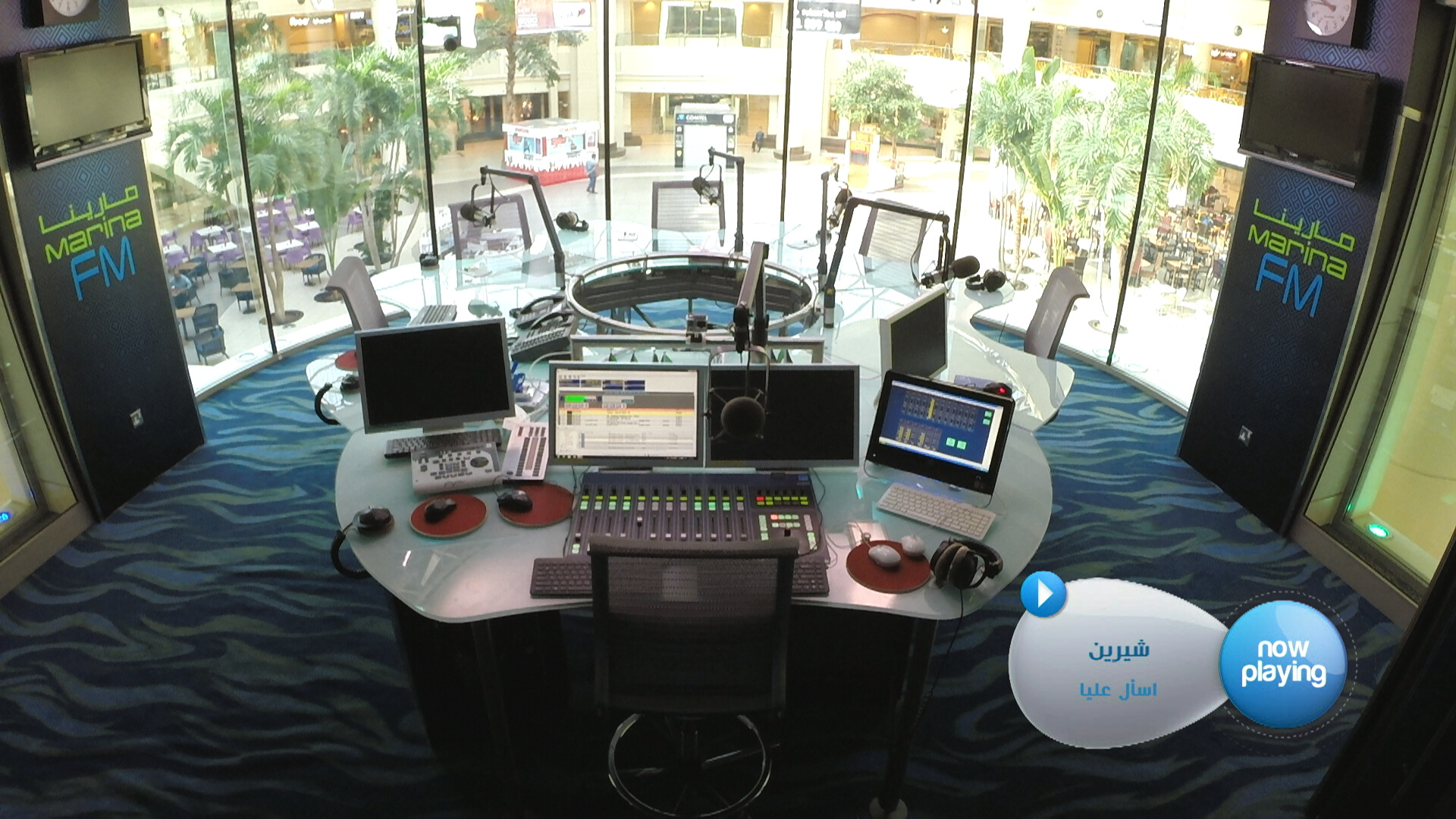
90.4 Studio

== Launch ==
Marina FM was launched on 1 April 2005 on the frequency 88.8 MHz as the first private station in Kuwait. From November 17, 2016, MarinaFM upgraded to a new frequency, 90.4 MHz, as Q8 Pulse took the 88.8 frequency.
