= Argaam =

Saudi Arabian financial news portal

- Native name: أرقام
- Company type: Private
- Industry: Financial markets and macroeconomics in Saudi Arabia
- Founded: March 1, 2007; 19 years ago in Riyadh, Saudi Arabia
- Founder: Tariq Al Asiri | Dr. Rashid Al Owin
- Headquarters: Riyadh, Saudi Arabia
- Key people: Islam Zween (CEO), Mohamed Maameri (COO), Abdulaziz AlObaid (CRO), Mahmoud Hamdy (CMO), Waleed ElSayed (CFO)
- Products: Argaam Plus / Argaam Insights / IR services / IR Apps / Akhbaar24
- Owner: SRMG 51% and 49% for private investors
- Number of employees: 255 (2024)
- Parent: Saudi Research and Marketing Group (SRMG)
- Website: https://www.srmg.com/en/home

Argaam (Arabic: أرقام) is a Saudi Arabian financial news portal and considered the primary source for financial news as it provides real-time updates on financial markets as well as market data and analysis, interviews, and coverage of stocks listed across the region. Argaam has won UAE App & Web Award and is operated by the Argaam Investment Company, which launched the Arabic version in March 2007 and an English variant in April 2015.

== History ==
The company was founded on 1 March 2007 in Riyadh, Saudi Arabia.

On October 18, 2017, the Saudi Research and Marketing Group (SRMG) acquired a controlling stake in the Argaam Investment and Trading Company, which publishes an online financial news service. SRMG acquired 51 percent of Argaam for $10 million in an attempt to expand its operations, at a time when Saudi Arabia was diversifying its economy and opening up to more foreign investments and as a part of the National Transformation Plan 2020 (NTP) and Vision 2030.

== Akhbaar24 ==
Akhbaar24 (Arabic: أخبار24) is an electronic newspaper specialized in covering the latest news of interest to Saudi Arabian and Arab audience 24 hours a day, whether local or foreign. The service also covers the most influential political news in the Middle East. Akhbaar24's website also features 24 a specialized vertical for the most prominent videos posted on social networking sites and the Internet that deal with Saudi affairs. In 2022, Argaam sold 100% of its ownership of Akhbaar24 to SRMG. Following this acquisition, SRMG revamped and relaunched Akhbaar24 in June 2023, imbuing it with deeper coverage of Saudi-related news and topics, thus enhancing its Saudi Depth.

== Alphabeta ==
Alphabeta is a sub-division of Argaam that publishes field-related Gulf columnists' articles.
