= Kuwait Times =

English-language newspaper in Kuwait

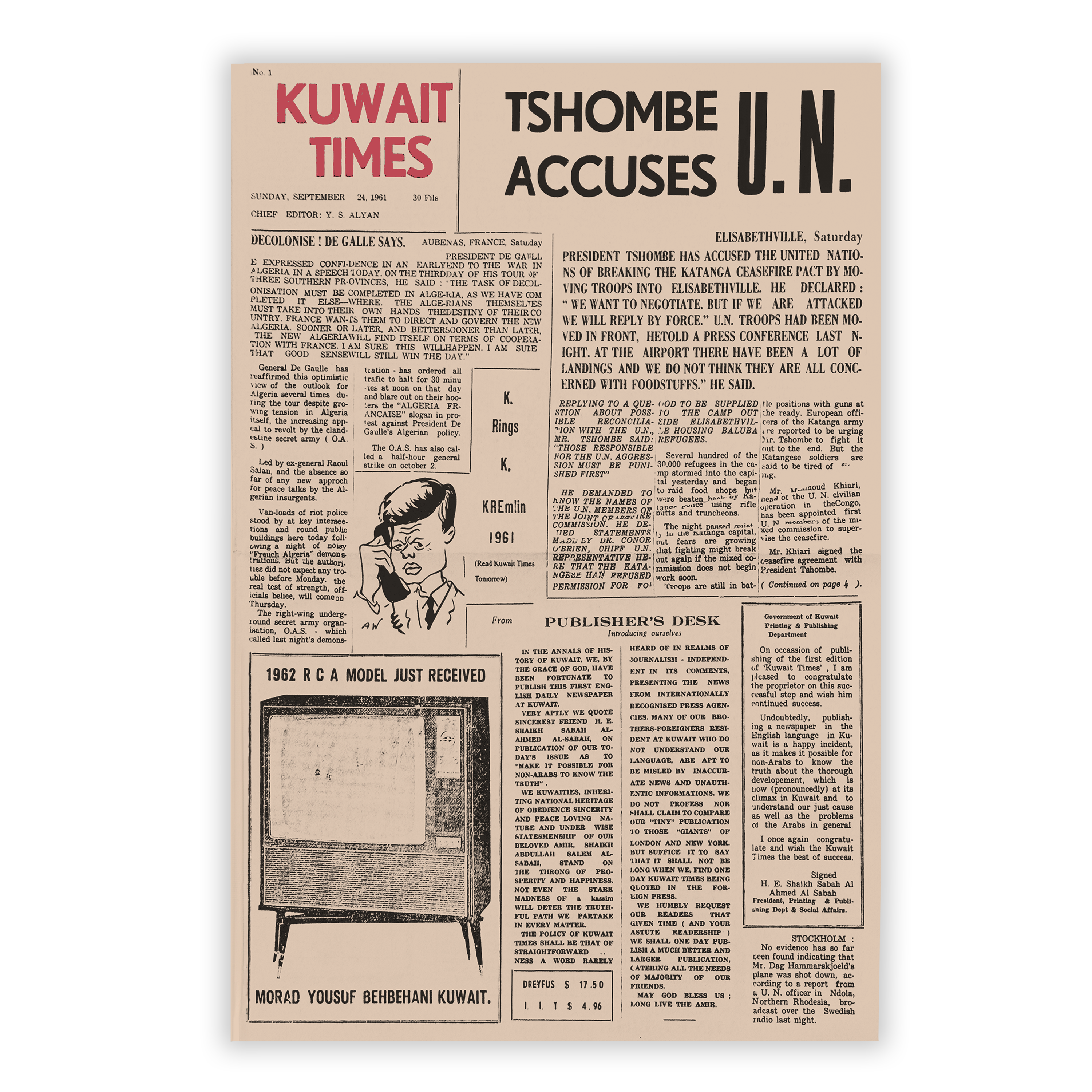
- Kuwait Times First Edition Front Page
- Type: Daily newspaper
- Format: Broadsheet
- Owner: Yousuf Saleh Alyan
- Editor-in-chief: Dr. Ziad Alyan
- Deputy editor: Abdullah Boftain & Jana Al Naqeeb
- Founded: 1961; 65 years ago
- Language: English
- Headquarters: Shuwaikh, Kuwait
- OCLC number: 232118740
- Website: www.kuwaittimes.com
- Free online archives: www.instagram.com/kuwaittimes.archive/

Kuwait Times is an English-language daily published in Kuwait. It was the first English language paper in the Gulf region, and remains the oldest active newspaper in Kuwait.

The paper was created to provide English-language news to the country's significant non-Arab population.

== History and profile ==
Kuwait Times was founded by Yousuf Saleh Alyan in 24 september 1961. The 16-page broadsheet provides in-depth reporting on local events and business news, analysis and editorials on local, regional, and international issues, and entertainment and sports news and features.

A portrait of Yousuf Al Alyan, founder of the Kuwait Times, taken in 2004

Since its founding in 1961, the Kuwait Times has branched out to include Kuwait News, an Arabic-language digital news outlet. In 2024, the Kuwait Times also launched Kuwait Times Archive, dedicated to historic content derived from the bound archives of Kuwait Times.

Kuwait Times' discontinued projects include the Friday Times, a free 40-page tabloid. It was the first tabloid in the country, offering local commentary, news, and analysis as well as entertainment, sports, and comprehensive features. Another discontinued Kuwait Times initiative was the sister Arabic daily newspaper, Alfajer Aljadeed, which was published for two years, following the invasion of Kuwait.

== Branding & Structure ==
The Kuwait Times has undergone significant branding shifts since 1961. The newspaper began as a 4-page publication, however would eventually expand to 38 pages before settling to 16 pages due to a decrease in newspaper circulation.

The logo of the paper would also change during this period, evolving several times from the simple "KUWAIT TIMES" printed in its first editions. To commemorate the newspaper attaining its own press, the logo would eventually incorporate a traditional Kuwaiti dhow flanked by two whales.

The newspaper would also transition from a black and red colour scheme to a black and blue one over the course of the 1970s and 1980s.

== Digital Transformation ==
With the need to pivot from print to digital spaces, Kuwait Times has become a local pioneer in digital adoption. The newspaper launched its website, www.kuwaittimes.com, in 1995 (then www.kuwaittimes.net).

In 2025, the newspaper began a visual transformation through Head of Visual Design Omar Al Nakib, adopting a younger aesthetic based on grunge and handmade design principles.

This translated to the newspaper growing from 170,000 followers on Instagram in January of 2024 to over 400,000 by its 65th anniversary.

It also allowed the Kuwait Times to be the first Kuwaiti newspaper to launch its own line of merchandise.

A promotional photograph from Kuwait Times' first merch run in 2025

== Firsts ==
- First English language newspaper in the Gulf
- First English language daily in the Gulf
- First tabloid launched in Kuwait
- First newspaper to sell merchandise in Kuwait

== Kuwait Times Archive ==
In February 2024, the Kuwait Times launched a new Instagram page dedicated to preserving its historic newspaper archives. The creator of the page was Yousef Abu-Ghazaleh, who began creating photo and video content centred around history through the pages of newspapers preserved by the Kuwait Times throughout its history to that point.

The Kuwait Times Archive also pivoted to international content through the 'Unfolding the Map' series, through which Abu-Ghazaleh travelled through Kazakhstan and Uzbekistan documenting life in post-Soviet Central Asia.

== Languages ==
The Kuwait Times during different points in history also ran publications in the following languages:

- Malayalam
- Urdu
- French

== See also ==
- List of newspapers in Kuwait
