= Al Qabas =

Daily newspaper in Kuwait

Al-Qabas القبس
- Type: Daily newspaper
- Format: Tabloid
- Owner(s): Al-Nusif, Al-Kharafi, Al-Bahar, Al-Shaya families
- Publisher: Dar Al-Qabas Press Printing, Publishing and Distribution Company
- Editor-in-chief: Walid Al-Nisef
- Associate editor: Abdullah Ghazi Almudhaf
- Founded: 22 February 1972; 54 years ago
- Political alignment: Liberalism
- Language: Arabic
- Headquarters: Kuwait City
- Website: Official website

Al-Qabas (Arabic: القبس, lit. 'the Firebrand or the Starbrand') is an Arabic daily Kuwaiti newspaper and tabloid published by Dar Al Qabas Press Printing Publishing and Distribution Company in Kuwait City.

== History and profile ==
Al-Qabas was launched on 22 February 1972. The founding shareholders of Al Qabas, according to the founding contract as printed in the official gazette Kuwait Al-Yawm are Kuwaiti merchant families Al-Nusif, Al-Kharafi, Al-Bahar, Al-Shaya, and Al-Saqer. The paper is headquartered in Kuwait City.

Al-Qabas' in early days were characterized by Mohammed Al-Sager, who had been its dynamic editor-in-chief since 1982 until his election in the Kuwait National Assembly in 1999. With his experience in international finance, Al-Sager had set up an international edition that was published in Paris, London and Marseilles (for the North African market). The paper had maintained the most extensive foreign correspondent staff of any Kuwaiti newspaper with large bureaus in Washington, London, Beirut, Cairo, and Moscow.

After the liberation of Kuwait, Al Qabas discontinued its international editions. During the invasion it moved to London and was first published there on 2 August 1990.

Al Qabas had a weekly supplement on environmental issues, which can be translated into English as Our Environment is Our Life.

The daily had a circulation of 120,000 copies before the invasion of Kuwait in 1991. Its 2001 circulation was 79,000 copies and the paper was the third best selling newspaper in Kuwait. The paper also began its online edition which had 30,000 weekly hits in 2001.

== Political stance and staff ==
Al Qabas had a critical approach to government of Kuwait and is a liberal publication. In April 2012, it published an editorial calling for ending the struggle within the ruling family of Kuwait, Al Sabah.

The paper's editor, Mohammed Al-Sager, is a winner of the International Press Freedom Award of the Committee to Protect Journalists "for courageous reporting on political and human rights issues in the face of government threats of censorship and prosecution".

The other significant editors of the daily include Abdullatif Al-Duaij and Ahmad Bishara. The Palestinian cartoonist Naji Salim al-Ali worked for the paper in the 1980s and he was killed in 1987 while working for the London edition of the daily.

Respected Arab figures also contributed to the daily, including Egyptian novelist Naguib Mahfouz and Egyptian philosopher Fauad Zakara.

In 2019, Al Qabas launched a premium digital subscription service, producing video content for subscribers. Its flagship show, The Black Box featured 32 interviews with controversial former Kuwaiti MP and academic Abdullah Al-Nafisi. Subsequent seasons featured extensive interviews with former Guantanamo detention camp detainee Faiz Al Kandari.
