= Insurance Regulatory Unit (Kuwait) =

Government agency of Kuwait

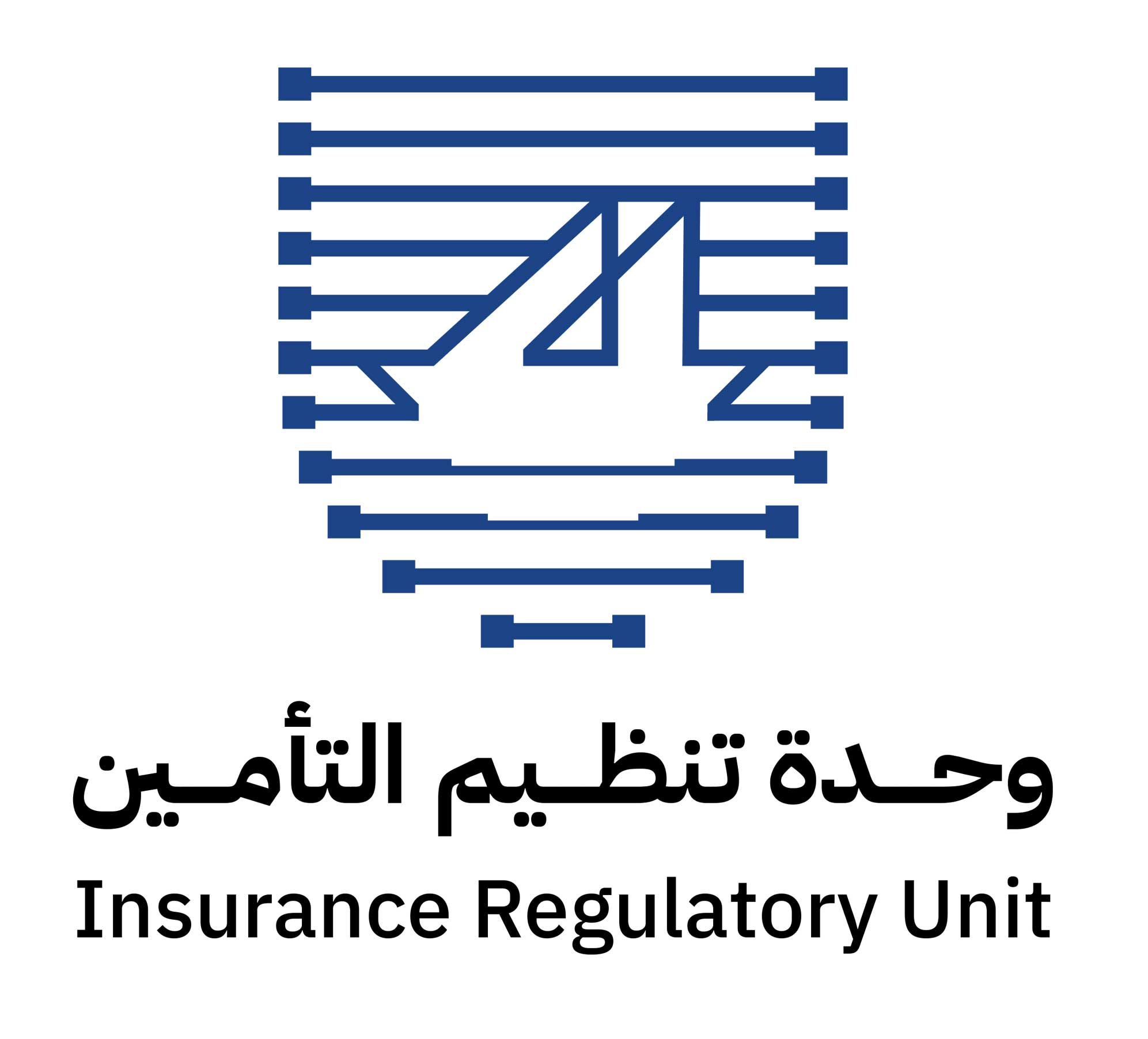

Authority overview
- Formed: 1 September 2019
- Jurisdiction: Kuwait
- Headquarters: KAMCO Tower, Kuwait City.
- Parent department: Ministry of Commerce and Industry
- Website: iru.gov.kw

The Insurance Regulatory Unit (Arabic: وحدة تنظيم التأمين) was established in accordance with Law No. (125) of 2019 regarding the regulation of insurance issued in the Official Gazette on 01-09-2019, and according to the law, the unit regulates insurance activity and controls it in a manner that is fair, transparent and competitive, and develops insurance activity. In line with international best practices and providing protection for all stakeholders involved in the insurance activity.

== Objectives ==
- Regulates insurance market activities in a manner that is fair, transparent and competitive.
- Develops insurance activities and mechanisms in line with best international best practices.
- Providing protection for all stakeholders involved in insurance activities.
- Applies policies that achieves fairness, transparency and prevents conflict of interests.
- Ensures compliance with regulations pertaining to insurance activities.
- Raises public's awareness of insurance activities, benefits, risks, and legal obligations.
