= Regulatory technology =

Business compliance technology

Regulatory technology (RegTech) is the use of information technology to enhance regulatory and compliance processes. RegTech is most usefully applied to heavily regulated industries and activities such as financial services, gaming, healthcare, pharmaceutical, energy and aviation.

Regulatory technology broadly seeks to produce cost savings to financial industry and government regulators through the course of their daily operations. To do so, regulatory technology platforms emphasize regulatory monitoring, reporting and compliance, and aims to enhance transparency to remove ambiguity from regulations and provide higher quality outcomes at a lower cost.

== Origin ==
At a governmental level, the FCA was the first governmental body to establish and promote the term RegTech, defining this as: "RegTech is a sub-set of FinTech that focuses on technologies that may facilitate the delivery of regulatory requirements more efficiently and effectively than existing capabilities".

In March 2015, a report by the UK Government Chief Scientific Adviser, stated that "FinTech has the potential to be applied to regulation and compliance to make financial regulation and reporting more transparent, efficient and effective – creating new mechanisms for regulatory technology, RegTech".

Yet the vision of a technology-led regime has already been proposed as early as 2014, by Andy Haldane, during a keynote address at Birmingham University

I have a dream. It is futuristic, but realistic. It involves a Star Trek chair and a bank of monitors. It would involve tracking the global flow of funds in close to real time (from a Star Trek chair using a bank of monitors), in much the same way as happens with global weather systems and global internet traffic. Its centerpiece would be a global map of financial flows, charting spill-overs and correlations.

== Development ==
RegTech for financial services spans several domains, including compliance of banks, investment advisers, and broker-dealers. RegTech applications for these entities include but are not limited to regulatory reporting, supervisory compliance (sometimes referred to as SupTech as a subset), risk management, and transaction monitoring. These technologies are designed to help companies meet requirements under frameworks such as Know Your Customer (KYC), Anti-Money Laundering (AML), Markets in Financial Instruments Directive (MiFID II), and Dodd-Frank Act provisions. RegTech platforms in finance typically combine data analytics, machine learning, and automated reporting systems to reduce compliance costs while improving accuracy and timeliness of regulatory obligations.

The cost of regulatory obligations has increased dramatically, with 87% of banking CEOs in one survey considering these costs a source of disruption. This provides a strong economic incentive for more efficient reporting and compliance systems to better control risks and reduce compliance costs. Furthermore, the massive increases in the volume and types of data that must be reported to regulatory authorities represent a major opportunity to automate compliance and monitoring processes. The application of technology to regulation and compliance was viewed as potentially increasing incumbents' efficiency and the economies of scope and scale.

Two pressure points have facilitated the development of RegTech. On the expense side, post-crisis fines have exceeded US$200 billion, and the ongoing cost of regulation and compliance has become a primary concern industry-wide. On the revenue side, competition from FinTech companies is expected to put US$4.7 trillion of revenues at risk. These expense and revenue factors are driving the development of RegTech.

As with FinTech, the 2008 GFC represented a turning point in the development of RegTech. However, the factors underlying and the beneficiaries of RegTech are quite different. FinTech growth has been led by start-ups (now increasingly partnering with, or being acquired by, banks and other traditional financial institutions), whilst RegTech developments to date are primarily a response to the huge costs of complying with new institutional demands by regulators and policy-makers.

=== Financial advisers ===
Academic research studying financial advisers' response to regulation-induced investments in regtech found positive effects on operational efficiency but negative effects on profitability, particularly among smaller firms. Affected firms increased spending on enterprise resource planning (ERP) systems and hardware, as well as further spending in complementary technologies like those related to customer relationship management (CRM). The research also documented that market concentration increased through acquisition activity as well as individual financial adviser movement, suggesting potential changes to industry structure due to the rule's primary compliance objectives.
