= Christian Zimmerman =

American politician, pastor, and pilot from Idaho

Christian Zimmermann

Member of the Idaho House of Representatives from the District 8, seat A district
- In office December 1, 1996 – December 1, 2000
- Preceded by: Gayle Ann Wilde
- Succeeded by: Ken Roberts

Personal details
- Born: April 14, 1940 (age 86) Shasi, Hubei, China (present-day Jingzhou, Hubei, China)
- Party: Republican
- Spouse: Melvia Kahale
- Children: 3
- Education: Boise State University, National Defense University
- Occupation: Pastor, politician, USAF pilot and commercial pilot
- Military career
- Allegiance: United States
- Branch: United States Air Force
- Service years: 1959–1989
- Rank: Lieutenant colonel

Benjamin Christian Zimmermann is an American pastor, former politician, retired United States Air Force pilot, and commercial pilot from Idaho. Zimmermann was a Republican member of the Idaho House of Representatives.

== Early life ==
On April 14, 1940, Zimmermann was born in Shasi, Hubei Province, China. Zimmermann's parents were Lutheran missionaries in China. Zimmermann has a sister, Katharine.

== Education ==
Zimmermann attended Boise State University and Iowa State University. In 1980, Zimmermann earned a master of divinity degree from Concordia Seminary in Clayton, Missouri. In 1985, Zimmermann earned a degree from National Defense University.

== Career ==
In military, in 1959, Zimmermann served as an officer and a pilot in the US Air Force and Air National Guard and Reserve, until 1989. Zimmermann is a lieutenant colonel.

In 1968, Zimmermann became a commercial pilot for Trans World Airlines, until his retirement in May 1995.

In 1980, Zimmermann became a Lutheran minister, and is a pastor in Idaho.

On June 14, 1985, as a flight engineer of TWA Flight 847, his airplane was hijacked by Lebanese Shiite Muslims on a flight from Athens, Greece to Rome, Italy. The airplane eventually landed in Beirut. Zimmermann survived a beating at the hands of the hijackers. Eventually, most of the passengers and crew members were released. Zimmermann returned to Boise, Idaho, on July 4, 1985. In November 1985, Zimmermann became the author of Hostage in a Hostage World: Hope Aboard Hijacked TWA 847.

In May 1995, Zimmermann became a city council member of Cascade, Idaho, and became council president.

On November 5, 1996, Zimmermann won the election and became a Republican member of Idaho House of Representatives for District 8, seat A. Zimmermann defeated Gayle Wilde with 88.6% of the votes. On November 3, 1998, as an incumbent, Zimmermann won the election unopposed and continued serving District 8, seat A.

In April 2014, at age 74, Zimmermann became a pastor of Pilgrim Lutheran Church in Ontario, Oregon.

== Awards ==
- 1986 Silver Medillion award, presented by Boise State University

== Personal life ==
Zimmermann's wife is Melvia Kahale. They have three children. Zimmermann and his family live in Eagle, Idaho.

== See also ==
- Robert Stethem (United States Navy Seabee diver)
- Uli Derickson
- The Taking of Flight 847: The Uli Derickson Story (Ben Zimmermann)
