= Uli Derickson =

German American flight attendant (1944–2005)

- Born: Ulrike Patzelt; August 8, 1944; Aussig (Ústí nad Labem), Protectorate of Bohemia and Moravia
- Died: February 18, 2005 (aged 60); Tucson, Arizona, U.S.
- Known for: Purser of TWA Flight 847
- Spouse: Russell Derickson
- Children: 1

Uli Derickson (née Patzelt; August 8, 1944 – February 18, 2005) was a German American flight attendant best known for her role in helping protect 152 passengers and crew members during the June 14, 1985, hijacking of TWA Flight 847 by militants linked with Hezbollah.

== Early life ==
Uli Derickson was born as Ulrike Patzelt on August 8, 1944, in Aussig (Ústí nad Labem), Protectorate of Bohemia and Moravia. Her family was expelled from Czechoslovakia while she was a child, and moved to East Germany. They later fled to West Germany. She worked jobs as a clerk for a bank and car dealership and also held a part-time job as an au pair in the UK and Switzerland before emigrating to the United States in 1967. Derickson also worked as an au pair in Connecticut before joining Trans World Airlines (TWA) where she met her husband, pilot Russell Derickson. They were married in the 1970s and had a son, Matthew.

In 1985, Russell Derickson retired from his job as TWA pilot.

== TWA 847 ==
On June 14, 1985, Derickson was serving as the purser (lead flight attendant) on TWA Flight 847 between Athens and Rome when the flight was hijacked. Derickson took a kick to the chest from one of the hijackers as he forced her to go with him into the cockpit. The other hijacker—who was holding a grenade with the pin removed—started kicking open the door. Once inside, they pistol-whipped the pilot and flight engineer. The two hijackers spoke poor English, but one of them spoke fluent German. Derickson was the only crew member able to speak German, which left her responsible for translating the hijackers' demands to the pilot. At one point, one of the two hijackers asked her to marry him, something she later described as the most terrifying moment of the ordeal.

During the hijacking Derickson was asked to sort through passenger passports to single out people with Jewish-sounding names. Initial reports suggested that she had followed the orders. It was later revealed she had actually hidden the passports.

The plane was diverted first to Beirut, where Derickson first pleaded with the hijackers to release the women on board the plane. After the hijackers refused, she successfully pleaded for the release of 17 elderly women and two children. The hijackers then directed the plane to Algiers wherein the ground crew in Algiers refused to refuel the plane without payment, leading the hijackers to threaten violence. It occurred to Derickson to offer her personal Shell Oil credit card. The ground crew charged about $5,500 for 22,700 L (6,000 gal) of fuel.

The hijackers then ordered the plane flown back to Beirut. On the way the first real violence started. The hijackers had earlier identified some American military personnel on the flight. They singled out U.S. Navy diver Robert D. Stethem. After beating him severely with an armrest, they shot Stethem and dumped his body on the ramp after landing. Additional henchmen boarded the plane to assist the hijackers. The plane then headed back toward Algiers, where Derickson and the rest of the women on board were released. The plane, now with only 39 American men on board as hostages, flew back to Beirut where they were held for 17 days. The ordeal ended on June 30 after Israel released 31 Lebanese prisoners, a fraction of the 766 the hijackers had demanded.

== Aftermath, later life, and death ==
Derickson later gave an interview about the incident which led to confusion in the media. She was at first falsely accused of helping terrorists find passengers with Jewish names, which led to threats. When it was discovered that she had done the opposite, and in fact helped to protect the Jews on board, it led to more threats from other groups. Due to these continued threats, Derickson's family relocated to Arizona from New Jersey.

After the TWA 847 incident, Derickson continued her job as a flight attendant for TWA until her resignation in the late 1980s. She worked at an Arizona real-estate firm before joining Delta Air Lines in the 1990s, where she continued her work there as a flight attendant. For her heroism, Derickson, a resident of Fredon Township, New Jersey, was awarded the Silver Cross for Valor by the Legion of Valor, a veterans' organization; she was the first woman to be so honored. A 1988 TV movie based on her experience, The Taking of Flight 847: The Uli Derickson Story, featuring Lindsay Wagner as Derickson, received five Emmy nominations. The action film The Delta Force (1986), inspired by the TWA Flight 847 hijacking, features a German air hostess (played by Hanna Schygulla) modelled after Derickson.

Subsequently, Derickson testified as a prosecution witness at the trial of Mohammed Ali Hamadi, one of the hijackers convicted of murdering Stethem. He received a life sentence. She later advised TWA, Delta Air Lines and the FBI on crisis management.

Derickson was still working as a flight attendant for Delta Air Lines when she was diagnosed with cancer in August 2003. Russell died earlier the same year. On February 18, 2005, she died in her Tucson residence at the age of 60.

== See also ==
- Christian Zimmerman, Flight Engineer of TWA Flight 847
