= The Taking of Flight 847: The Uli Derickson Story =

1988 television film directed by Paul Wendkos

- Original print ad
- Also known as: The Flight (VHS/LaserDisc release in USA)
- Genre: Drama
- Written by: Norman Morrill
- Directed by: Paul Wendkos
- Starring: Lindsay Wagner; Eli Danker; Sandy McPeak
- Music by: Gil Mellé; Demis Roussos
- Country of origin: United States
- Original languages: English; Arabic; German

Production
- Executive producers: Jim Calio; David Hume Kennerly
- Producer: Jay Benson
- Production locations: Warner Brothers Burbank Studio, California
- Cinematography: Chuck Arnold
- Editor: James Galloway
- Running time: 100 minutes
- Production company: Columbia Pictures Television

Original release
- Network: NBC
- Release: May 2, 1988

The Taking of Flight 847: The Uli Derickson Story (also known as The Flight) is a 1988 American made-for-television drama film based on the actual hijacking of TWA Flight 847 as seen through the eyes of flight purser Uli Derickson, the chief flight attendant. Derickson herself acted as a consultant for the film. The film was directed by Paul Wendkos and showcases the first 48 hours of the hijacking until Derickson's liberation. The film premiered on NBC on May 2, 1988.

== Synopsis ==
Passengers board TWA Flight 847 at Ellinikon International Airport, continuing the plane's journey from Cairo to Rome's Fiumicino Airport. After the aircraft leaves Athens, two passengers, "Castro" and Saiid, hijack the plane with pistols and hand grenades. Uli Derickson, the chief stewardess, is forced at gunpoint to the flight deck door. She realizes neither hijacker speaks English, but one speaks her native German. A third English-speaking hijacker, Ali Atwa, missed the flight in Athens. She communicates the hijackers' demands to the airline which orders the aircraft to re-route to Algiers.

Lacking fuel for the journey, the hijackers fly to Beirut, at the limit of their fuel supply. A passenger, US Navy diver Robert Stethem, and the flight engineer are beaten until Beirut authorities agree to refuel the plane. Several passengers are freed after Uli advises the hijackers that fewer passengers will increase the aircraft's range. The plane departs for Algiers and Castro demands Uli identify the Jewish passengers. She refuses, and is forced to read aloud the names of from the passenger's passports so Castro can select those he thinks are of Jewish descent. They're moved to the rear of the aircraft where Castro scolds them. More hostages are released in Algiers, but the airport refuses to provide fuel without payment. Uli pays with her personal credit card to spare the passengers further violence from the hijackers.

After a tip-off of an impending US strike on the aircraft, Flight 847 departs again for Beirut. Stethem and another passenger are beaten and Derickson is able to calm the hijackers by singing them a folk song. Beirut refuses landing clearance and another passenger is beaten in retaliation until Uli intervenes. When Beirut relents and the plane comes to a stop on the tarmac, the hijackers murder Stethem throw him out the forward exit. Additional hijackers board the plane and remove the passengers with Jewish-sounding names and those with US military credentials. Flight 847 remains in Beirut until early morning, when news of another planned attack to free the aircraft is relayed to the hijackers.

The airliner departs for Algiers, where authorities coordinate Ali Atwa's release to the hijackers. Castro then frees Uli. Unwilling to leave the others, she convinces one of the dominant hijackers to free the remaining women passengers and flight attendants. Uli returns home to the United States, ties a yellow ribbon to the tree in front of her home with her son, and watches a television news show with her husband which reports the freedom of the remaining hostages in Beirut two weeks later.

== Cast ==
- Lindsay Wagner – Uli Derickson
- Eli Danker – "Castro" (Lead hijacker; based on Mohammed Ali Hammadi, real life hijacker of TWA 847)
- Sandy McPeak – Captain John Testrake
- Ray Wise – First Officer Phil Maresca (First Officer)
- Leslie Easterbrook – Audrey (Flight Attendant)
- Laurie Walters – Jane (Flight Attendant)
- Joseph Nasser – Saiid (Hijacker)
- Steven Eckholdt – Robert Stethem
- Barry Jenner – Flight Engineer Ben Christian Zimmerman

== Releases ==
The film was released on television on May 2, 1988. It was later released on home video in the United States in 1990, in both VHS and LaserDisc formats, by Vidmark Entertainment under an alternate title, The Flight. There were also releases of this film using its original title on VHS in several other countries, including the United Kingdom and Australia. No official DVD or Blu-ray releases of this film were ever produced. As of October 2023, the film is available to stream in the United States on the Tubi streaming platform under its original title.

== Nominations ==
In 1988, at the 40th Primetime Emmy Awards, the film received five Emmy nominations: for Outstanding Television Movie; Outstanding Directing for a Limited Series, Movie, or Dramatic Special; Outstanding Makeup for a Limited Series or Movie (Non-Prosthetic); Outstanding Single-Camera Picture Editing for a Limited Series or Movie; and David Yewdall for Outstanding Sound Editing for a Limited Series, Movie, or Special.
