= Osthoff =

Osthoff is a surname. Notable people with the surname include:

- Hermann Osthoff (1847–1909), German linguist
- Markus Osthoff (born 1968), German football player
- Oscar Osthoff (1883–1950), American athlete and coach
- Susanne Osthoff (born 1962), German archaeologist
- Tom Osthoff (1936–2025), American politician
