= Kuwait Airways Flight 422 =

1988 aircraft hijacking and hostage crisis

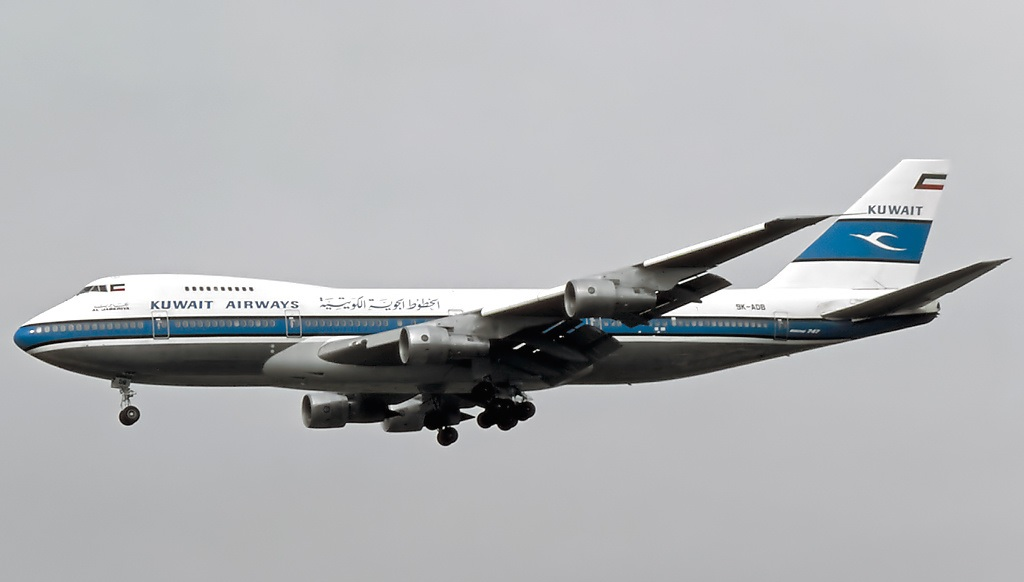
- 9K-ADB, the aircraft involved in the hijacking, seen in 1980

Hijacking
- Date: 5–20 April 1988 (15 days)
- Summary: Hijacking
- Site: Near the Omani airspace, Gulf of Oman

Aircraft
- Aircraft type: Boeing 747-269B
- Aircraft name: Al Jaberiya
- Operator: Kuwait Airways
- Registration: 9K-ADB
- Flight origin: Don Mueang International Airport, Bangkok, Thailand
- Destination: Kuwait International Airport, Kuwait City, Kuwait
- Occupants: 112
- Passengers: 97
- Crew: 15
- Fatalities: 2
- Survivors: 110

Kuwait Airways Flight 422 was a Boeing 747-200 hijacked en route from Bangkok, Thailand, to Kuwait City, Kuwait on 5 April 1988, leading to a hostage crisis that lasted 16 days and encompassed three continents. The hijacking was carried out by several Lebanese guerillas who demanded the release of 17 Shi'ite Muslim prisoners being held by Kuwait for their role in the 1983 Kuwait bombings. During the incident the flight, initially forced to land in Iran, traveled 3,200 mi (5,100 km) from Mashhad in northeastern Iran to Larnaca, Cyprus, and finally to Algiers.

Kuwait sent officials to negotiate with the group, but negotiations became bogged down because the terrorists refused to release the hostages. Two hostages were killed during the course of the siege, before it eventually ended in Algiers on 20 April. The hijackers – who were suspected by Kuwait of belonging to the Lebanon-based Hezbollah organisation – were given passage out of Algeria. With a duration of 16 days, the crisis became one of the world's longest skyjackings. It also inspired a brief armed siege at a high school in the United States a few days later.

== Initial hijacking and flight to Iran ==
On 5 April 1988, KU 422 departed Don Mueang International Airport in Bangkok. The crew included Captain Subhi Naim Yousif, 53 years old, an Iraqi, the co-pilot Eid Al-Azmi, 31 years old, a Kuwaiti, and flight engineer Ayyad Al-Shamilaan, 43 years old, a Kuwaiti. and 112 passengers aboard, including three members of the Kuwaiti Royal Family. About three hours out of Bangkok, over the Arabian Sea, a number of Lebanese men armed with guns and hand grenades took control of the plane. A passenger later reported the hijackers to have said, "Don't worry, we are after redressing our rights denied by the Kuwaiti government". The hijackers forced the pilot to fly to Iran, where authorities initially refused the plane permission to land, but later acquiesced on learning it was running out of fuel. After subsequently landing at Mashhad, the hijackers issued their demand for the release of 17 guerrillas held by Kuwait following their conviction for involvement in the 1983 Kuwait bombings. In addition they threatened to blow up the aircraft if anyone approached it, and to kill the three Kuwaiti Royals if their terms were not met.

The hijackers were reported to number six or seven, and included Hassan Izz-Al-Din, who had previously been involved in the 1985 hijacking of TWA Flight 847. Following negotiations with the Iranian Prime Minister 25 hostages were released – a man with a heart condition on 5 April, and 24 women the following day. A further 32 were allowed to leave the plane on 7 April after the Kuwaiti government sent a team of negotiators to Iran to talk to the hijackers. However, negotiations were frustrated by Kuwait's support for Iraq in the ongoing Gulf Conflict between that country and Iran, and no more hostages were released in Iran. The hijackers forced authorities to refuel the plane by threatening to take off with almost empty fuel tanks, and shooting at security officials.

== Cyprus, Algeria, and hostage deaths ==
The plane took off from Mashhad on 8 April, but was refused landing permission at both Beirut in Lebanon and Damascus, Syria. However, after seven hours Cypriot authorities granted permission for it to land at Larnaca, where negotiations continued. Officials from Cyprus and the Palestinian Liberation Organisation (PLO) engaged in talks with the hijackers, resulting in the release of a hostage on 9 April. A further twelve people were freed on 12 April. However, over the same period two passengers, Abdullah Khalidi, 25, and Khalid Ayoub Bandar, 20, both Kuwaitis, were shot dead by the hijackers and dumped on the tarmac in Cyprus, as the hijackers demanded more fuel. In addition the pilot reported incidents of passenger beatings. The hijackers also threatened to fly the plane into the Kuwaiti Royal Palace, and to carry out what they termed a "slow and quiet massacre" if the prisoners were not released. On another occasion they claimed to be preparing for death, having dressed in shrouds and renamed the aircraft the "Plane of the Great Martyrs", an incident which led to an angry exchange with the control tower when an official referred to the plane by its flight number.

The plane was refueled and on 13 April, took off again, this time heading for Algeria, which had given it permission to land there, and the final week of the hijacking played itself out at Houari Boumedienne Airport in Algiers. Algeria – which had been a key player in the 1981 resolution of the Iran hostage crisis – began talks with the hijackers as soon as the plane touched down in Algiers. The aircraft was parked close to the terminal building, but was asked to move briefly as a security measure upon the arrival of a plane carrying Kenneth Kaunda, the president of Zambia.

Djuma Abdallah Shatti, a hostage with diabetes, was released on 14 April, leaving 31 people aboard. Afterwards the group issued a statement in which they said "We are not highway bandits. We are men of principle." Two of the remaining passengers subsequently spoke to the control tower at Algiers Airport urging the hijackers demands to be met or those still on board would be killed. Reports again emerged of maltreatment, with claims passengers were being beaten for talking without permission, although these stories could not be confirmed. Another request was made for fuel on 16 April. Algerian authorities reportedly kept the aircraft on the ground there at the request of Kuwaiti and Saudi Arabian authorities, but talks were stalled when both sides reached an impasse, something Algeria blamed on Kuwait's unwillingness to discuss the 17 prisoners, which it described as "intransigent". On 18 April members of the Kuwait national football team offered to take the place of the hostages. On the same day one of the Kuwaiti Royals held aboard, Prince Fadhal al-Sabah, urged his country's government to release the prisoners.

== Release of final hostages and aftermath ==
The group released their final hostages on 20 April, before surrendering themselves to Algerian authorities. Kuwait did not free the 17 prisoners and the hijackers were allowed to leave Algiers. Before surrendering, however, they issued a statement saying they would continue to fight for the release of the prisoners. They were later flown to an undisclosed destination. At its conclusion the crisis had lasted 16 days, making it one of the world's longest skyjackings.

With the hostage crisis over the remaining passengers were flown back to Kuwait. The two Kuwaitis killed during the course of the hijacking were buried at a ceremony attended by over 2,000 people. On 25 April, Time Magazine reported that many Middle East leaders had condemned the hijacking because it had shifted focus away from the Palestinian uprising against Israel that had commenced a few months earlier. It also frustrated already tense relations between Iran and the PLO. The Kuwait government believed the hijacking to be the work of Hezbollah, a pro-Iranian Shi'ite group based in Lebanon.

Many of the freed passengers claimed that Iran had aided the hijackers by providing weapons and explosives while the plane was at Mashhad Airport. Kuwaiti security officer Khaled Nasser Zaferi said that several more men boarded the plane after landing in Iran. "They produced a submachine gun and explosives they didn't have before. They were disguised as cleaning workers, but their performance was so bad and unprofessional that most of us whispered to each other, 'These must be Iranian security men.' " Passengers said the hijackers wiped surfaces clean of fingerprints, and removed other identifying evidence from the aircraft before the siege ended, while pilot Captain Subhi Yousif told reporters he had been unaware of the deaths of the two Kuwaiti men until his release.

The hijacking prompted an incident at San Gabriel High School in San Gabriel, California on 26 April 1988, when student Jeffrey Lyne Cox held a humanities class hostage with a semi-automatic rifle for over 30 minutes. Cox, who threatened to kill his classmates, was overpowered by fellow students and then detained by police. A friend later told the press that Cox had been inspired by the hijacking and the 1977 Stephen King novel Rage.

9K-ADB, the aircraft involved was returned to service until it was withdrawn in 1998. In 2008, the aircraft was delivered to Wells Fargo Bank Northwest as N309MF. The aircraft was derelict in King Khalid International Airport.

== In popular culture ==
- Days of Terror: The untold story of KU 221 & KU 422, a documentary film recounting the incident, was released in 2021.
- Al Jabriya: Flight 422, a series based on the incident produced by director Ashley Pearce, was released on the Shahid streaming platform in 2023, but was quickly removed from the platform due to backlash from the Kuwaiti government and public opinion. For this production, the former British Airways 747-436 with registration G-CIVW (msn 25822) which had been stored at Dunsfold Aerodrome, was revinyled into the Kuwait Airways livery of the 1980s and re-registered 9K-ADB.
