= Battle Beyond the Stars =

1980 American space opera film by Jimmy Murakami, Roger Corman

- Theatrical release poster by Gary Meyer
- Directed by: Jimmy T. Murakami
- Screenplay by: John Sayles
- Story by: John Sayles; Anne Dyer
- Based on: Seven Samurai by: Akira Kurosawa; Shinobu Hashimoto; Hideo Oguni; (all uncredited)
- Produced by: Ed Carlin
- Starring: Richard Thomas; Robert Vaughn; George Peppard; John Saxon; Sybil Danning; Darlanne Fluegel
- Cinematography: Daniel Lacambre
- Edited by: Allan Holzman; R. J. Kizer
- Music by: James Horner
- Production company: New World Pictures
- Distributed by: New World Pictures (US); Orion Pictures (International; through Warner Bros.)
- Release date: July 25, 1980 (US)
- Running time: 105 minutes
- Country: United States
- Language: English
- Budget: $2 million
- Box office: $11 million or $3.6 million ( U.S. collection)

Battle Beyond the Stars is a 1980 American space opera film directed by Jimmy T. Murakami, produced and distributed by Roger Corman's New World Pictures. It is a science fiction-themed interpretation of The Magnificent Seven (1960; itself a Western film version of Seven Samurai; 1954) in outer space. The film stars Richard Thomas, Robert Vaughn, George Peppard, John Saxon, Sybil Danning, Darlanne Fluegel, Sam Jaffe, Jeff Corey, Morgan Woodward, Earl Boen, and Lynn Carlin.

In keeping with Corman's longstanding cultivation of emergent talents, the screenplay was written by John Sayles (then transitioning from an aborted literary career under the producer's aegis), with an early score from James Horner and special effects designed by a nascent filmmaker James Cameron.

The film was theatrically released by New World Pictures on July 25, 1980. It was a decent box office success, despite receiving mixed reviews from critics. It was nominated for five Saturn Awards, including Best Science Fiction Film and Best Special Effects, with Sybil Danning winning a special award for Outstanding Achievement.

== Plot ==
Farm world Akir is threatened by the tyrannical warlord Sador, ruler of the Malmori Empire. Sador's body parts are deteriorating and he lives only by stealing organs from others. Sador demands that the peaceful Akira submit to him when he returns in "seven risings". Zed, last of the famous Akira Corsairs, suggests they hire mercenaries to protect them. Since Akir lacks valuable resources, its people can offer only food and shelter in payment. Unable to go in person, Zed offers his ship. Shad, a young man who has piloted the ship and is well known to its AI Nell, volunteers.

Shad goes to the space station of Doctor Hephaestus, an old friend of Zed. The station is populated mostly by androids, except for two humans: Hephaestus, whose numerous life support-systems have turned him into a cyborg, and his beautiful daughter Nanelia, who looks after him and the androids. The doctor wants Shad to mate with his daughter, by force if necessary. Shad persuades Nanelia to help him escape. She follows in her own ship; although it has no weapons, her highly advanced computer systems might be useful. The two split up to look for more mercenaries.

Shad encounters Cowboy, a freighter-pilot from Earth who is ambushed by Space Jackers while delivering a shipment of laser-handguns to the planet Umateal. Shad saves Cowboy from the Jackers. They arrive at Umateal too late to stop the destruction of the planet by Sador's flagship, the Hammerhead, which is equipped with a Stellar Converter. Lacking the fuel to carry his weapons back home, Cowboy offers them to Akir instead. Shad talks Cowboy into sharing his gunslinging experience with the Akira as well.

Shad meets a set of five alien clones who share a group consciousness named Nestor. They admit their life is incredibly dull, since their whole race shares one mind. In order to be entertained, they have sent five members to join Shad's cause. Nestor do not require payment, saying they are completely self-sufficient. Next, Shad recruits Gelt, a wealthy assassin who cannot show himself on any civilized planet for fear of retribution. Gelt offers his services in return for being allowed to live peacefully among the Akira. On his way back to Akir, Shad is approached by Saint-Exmin of the Valkyrie. She is a headstrong woman looking to prove herself in battle. She pilots the Dart, a small but extremely fast ship with enhanced firepower. Shad finds her annoying and wishes she would go away, but she tags along.

While passing through the Lambda Zone, Nanelia's ship is attacked by a light creature called a "zyme" which is killed by the powerful Gator ship of Cayman of the Lazuli. Cayman and his eclectic crew of aliens are "zymers," who hunt zyme as whalers hunt whales. After Cayman implies he could cook her down for protein or sell her, Nanelia accuses Cayman of being as heartless as Sador. Startled and enraged by the mention of the man who destroyed his homeworld long ago, Cayman joins their cause for the promise of Sador's head. Back on Akir, Shad's sister Mol is captured by Malmori pilots Kalo and Tembo, with the intent to rape her. As Shad and Company return, their approach frightens the Malmori into attempting to escape. Mol interferes with their controls, allowing Gelt the opportunity to destroy their ship, killing all three. On the planet's surface, the heroes are greeted with caution by the natives, who are wary of violent species. When Sador returns, his Malmori forces are intercepted by Shad's hired warriors. Gelt dogfights his way to the Hammerhead, which shoots him down. Shad insists that Gelt be buried with a fresh-cooked meal, as that was their arrangement: a meal and a place to hide. Cowboy and the laser-toting Akira ward off a Malmori ground force backed by a Sonic Tank. Many of Sador's troops are killed, and their Sonic Tank is destroyed; however, many Akira die as well, including Zed.

After surviving an assassination attempt by Nestor, Sador launches the remainder of his fleet in a retaliatory strike against Akir. Saint-Exmin makes an attack run on Hammerhead, then blows herself up, achieving the glorious death that she sought by disabling the Stellar Converter. Although Sador's aerospace forces are wiped out, Hammerhead picks off all the remaining mercenaries with laser battery-fire and nuclear missiles. Only Nell, piloted by Shad and Nanelia, survives the Malmori onslaught. Crippled and unable to fight, Nell is captured by Hammerhead's tractor beam. Nanelia and Shad activate Nell's self-destruct program, then flee in an escape pod. When Sador commands Nell to surrender, she detonates, causing his Stellar Converter to backfire and disintegrate Hammerhead. As Shad and Nanelia return to Akir, Nanelia despairs over their friends' deaths. Shad shares with her the teachings of Akir's "Varda": nobody is truly dead when they have been loved and are celebrated by the living. The Akira will always remember the sacrifices made by the mercenaries, who will forever be honored in the legends of Akir.

== Cast ==
- Richard Thomas as Shad, a young Akira farmer who looks for mercenaries to save his people. Over the course of the story, he evolves into the next Akira Corsair, brother of the ill-fated Mol.
- Robert Vaughn as Gelt, a notorious assassin with an intergalactic bounty on his head. Despite his vast riches, all he wants now is "a meal and a place to hide" Vaughn played Lee in The Magnificent Seven, essentially the same character as Gelt.
- John Saxon as Sador, leader of the evil Malmori raiders, is very old and keeps himself alive using transplants to renew his body. His role is analogous to the character of Calvera from The Magnificent Seven.
- George Peppard as Space Cowboy, the only character from Earth, who is defined by his many one-liners and who becomes Shad's good friend.
- Darlanne Fluegel as Nanelia, Dr. Hephaestus' beautiful daughter and Shad's love interest.
- Sybil Danning as Saint-Exmin, a Valkyrie warrior looking to prove herself in battle.
- Sam Jaffe as Dr. Hephaestus, an old man on life support, who wants grandchildren to inhabit his space station.
- Jeff Corey as Zed The Corsair, once a famed Akira warrior and now almost blind. He is the former pilot of Shad's starship, whose system computer he affectionately calls "Old Girl".
- Morgan Woodward as Cayman of The Lambda Zone, a Lazuli who works as a Zymer and has a score to settle with Sador for destroying his species.
- Marta Kristen as Lux, an Akira who works the early warning system and starts a relationship with Space Cowboy.
- Earl Boen as Nestor 1 The Voice, usually, for the five clones.
- John Gowens as Nestor 2
- Lynn Carlin as the voice of Nell, the computer which controls Zed's (now Shad's) starship. "She" is highly protective of Shad, whom she calls "wet behind the ears". The computer does not like it when anybody other than Zed addresses her as "Old Girl".
- Lawrence Steven Meyers as Thunin / Kelvin 1, one of Cayman's crew, communicates by radiating body heat.
- Lara Cody as Urim / Kelvin 2
- Steve Davis as Quepeg, the tattooed, harpoon throwing member of Cayman's crew.
- Julia Duffy as Mol, Shad's sister.

== Production ==
=== Development ===
Battle Beyond the Stars came out of producer Roger Corman's desire to make a space opera-style film in the wake of the massive worldwide success of Star Wars. It was budgeted at an estimated $2,000,000. At the time of its release, it was the most expensive film produced by Corman. Much of the budget allegedly went toward paying the salaries of George Peppard and Robert Vaughn, since both of screenwriter Sayles' previous films were low-budget productions.

Up-and-coming screenwriter John Sayles had already written the Corman-produced The Lady in Red and Piranha, the latter of which was both a financial and critical success. At one point, Australian director Richard Franklin was attached to direct. However, he was replaced by Jimmy T. Murakami, a veteran animator who had previously been an uncredited co-director on Corman's Humanoids from the Deep.

The film was co-financed by Orion Pictures who distributed the film in Europe. (Corman had a relationship with those executives when they worked at United Artists and had done a similar thing with them on Piranha.)

The planet Akir and its inhabitants, the Akira, a peaceful alien race at the center of the conflict, were named in honor of director Akira Kurosawa, whose film Seven Samurai provided the framework for the plot.

=== Casting ===
Prior to production, a Hollywood trade paper announced that John Wayne would star in the film, under the direction of Ingmar Bergman. In all likelihood, this was a joke, either by the trade paper or the film's publicist.

George Peppard had been the original choice to play Vin in The Magnificent Seven. Robert Vaughn played Lee in The Magnificent Seven, and essentially reprised his role as 'Gelt'.

Julia Duffy made her film debut, playing Shad's sister. Kathy Griffin appeared as an Akira extra.

=== Filming ===
To save on costs, the film was produced in Corman's own studio, his "renowned lumberyard facility" in Venice, California.

=== Visual effects and art direction ===
Corman initially hired James Cameron as a model maker for his studio after being impressed with his short film Xenogenesis. When the original art director for the film was fired, Cameron became responsible for the majority of the film's special effects, or, as Cameron later put it, "production design and art direction". This was Cameron's first "big break" in the entertainment industry, and it helped to propel his career. He was recommended by long-time working partner and future wife Gale Anne Hurd, who was at the time working for Corman.

While Cameron initially worked on camera rigging, he soon started working on special effects and production design of interior sets. The low budget led to Cameron's designing the spaceship's corridors out of spray-painted McDonald's containers. Cameron paid great attention to detail, and hardly slept for weeks while working on the film. His hard work paid off, as the special effects were one aspect of the film highly received by both fans and critics, opening the door for his later successes.

According to Hurd, actor Bill Paxton was employed on the set as a carpenter, which is where she first met him, before working with him and Cameron on Aliens: "So my first memory of Bill was him pounding nails and cracking everybody up. I mean, we'd be working at three or four in the morning and he would be the one who kept all our spirits up. He was that person on and off set".

=== Sound ===
The supervising sound editor, also responsible for special sound effects, such as Robert Vaughn's "laser shot" – based on Clint Eastwood's .44 Magnum from Dirty Harry – was David Yewdall, a regular contract-worker for Corman films. Yewdall later remarked on the "film's frugal sound editorial budget" in his Practical Art of Motion Picture Sound, and explained some of the movie's sounds: each of the seven spaceships had its own sound. The Nestor ship's sound was made from human voices generated by the community choir from his hometown college in Coalinga, California; Robert Vaughn's ship was based on the recording of a dragster.

== Music ==
This was composer James Horner's third film score. He had previously worked on Roger Corman's Humanoids from the Deep and The Lady in Red, and the producer brought him back for Battle Beyond the Stars. The score features several elements that would become regular staples of Horner's many science fiction and adventure film scores. Several fans have noted similarities between these scores and those for later films, such as Krull and Star Trek II: The Wrath of Khan. Horner was to go on to become a regular collaborator with James Cameron, eventually winning an Academy Award for Best Original Score for Titanic.

== Release ==
Battle Beyond the Stars was released into 330 theaters on July 25, 1980, grossing $1.732m in its first three days. Corman recouped his costs upon selling the foreign distribution to Orion Pictures and Warner Bros. Pictures for $2.5 million. He also resold cable rights to HBO for $750,000.

The film was released on DVD on February 6, 2001, by New Concorde. The film was later picked up by Shout! Factory, who released it on DVD and Blu-ray in 2011 as part of the Roger Corman's Cult Classics series.

== Reception ==
Battle Beyond the Stars received mixed reviews from critics due to its similar space opera styling, capitalizing upon the success of Star Wars. Cameron's special effects were praised as being impressive, considering the film's low budget, and helped to open the door for his future success.

In his Creature Features movie guidebook, John Stanley gave the movie three and a half stars, recommending the film for its fun script, special effects and its spirit of fun. FilmInk called it one of George Peppard's "best ever films" in which his performance was "warm, funny, touching... this sort of performance was why Peppard remained employed, for all his issues."

Christopher John reviewed Battle Beyond the Stars in Ares Magazine #5:

There is a lot to be pointed up in this picture. There is the fact that every different technology shows different lines of development. Every ship and the way it is operated is distinctly unique.

The film review aggregation website Rotten Tomatoes gives the film a score of 50%, based on reviews from 14 critics. Metacritic, which uses a weighted average, assigned the film a score of 59 out of 100, based on 9 critics, indicating "mixed or average" reviews.

=== Awards and nominations ===
==== Wins ====
Saturn Awards

- Outstanding Achievement: Sybil Danning – 1981

==== Nominations ====
Saturn Awards

- Best Science Fiction Film: 1981
- Best Special Effects: Chuck Comisky – 1981
- Best Costumes: Durinda Wood – 1981
- Best Make-Up: Sue Dolph, Steve Neill, Rick Stratton – 1981

== Battle Amongst the Stars comic book ==
A prequel comic book, set 30 years before the film, was launched by Bluewater Productions in March 2010. Battle Amongst the Stars is a four-part miniseries that tells the story of how Zed began his adventures from the planet Akir with Nell. It also has the characters of Dr. Hephaestus and Sador of the Malmori.

== Reuse of footage ==
The starship footage was reused in another Roger Corman science fiction film, Space Raiders, blasted by critics, as well as in the ultra-low budget Corman features Starquest II, Vampirella, The Fantastic Four, Dead Space, and Forbidden World. This same footage was also reused in later films and video games: a clip from the film (in 3-D) is shown during the movie theater fight scene at the end of Bachelor Party, and footage was also used for the LaserDisc game Astron Belt. The soundtrack was later recycled by Corman for Raptor and other films. Sections of Horner's score were reused in Space Raiders and other Corman films.

== See also ==
- List of American films of 1980

== Bibliography ==
- Ryan, Jack (January 1, 1998). John Sayles, Filmmaker: A Critical Study of the Independent Writer-Director: With a Filmography and a Bibliography (2nd ed.). New York City: McFarland & Company. p. 271. ISBN 978-0786405299.
- Gray, Beverly (2004). Roger Corman: Blood-sucking Vampires, Flesh-eating Cockroaches, and Driller Killers. New York City: Thunder's Mouth Press. p. 318. ISBN 978-1560255550.
- Meyers, Richard (January 1, 2001). Great Martial Arts Movies: From Bruce Lee to Jackie Chan and More. New York City: Citadel Press. p. 276. ISBN 978-0806520261.
- Yewdall, David Lewis (May 20, 2011). Practical Art of Motion Picture Sound (4th ed.). Waltham, Massachusetts: Taylor & Francis. p. 657. ISBN 978-0240808659.
