= TWA Flight 847 =

1985 aircraft hijacking

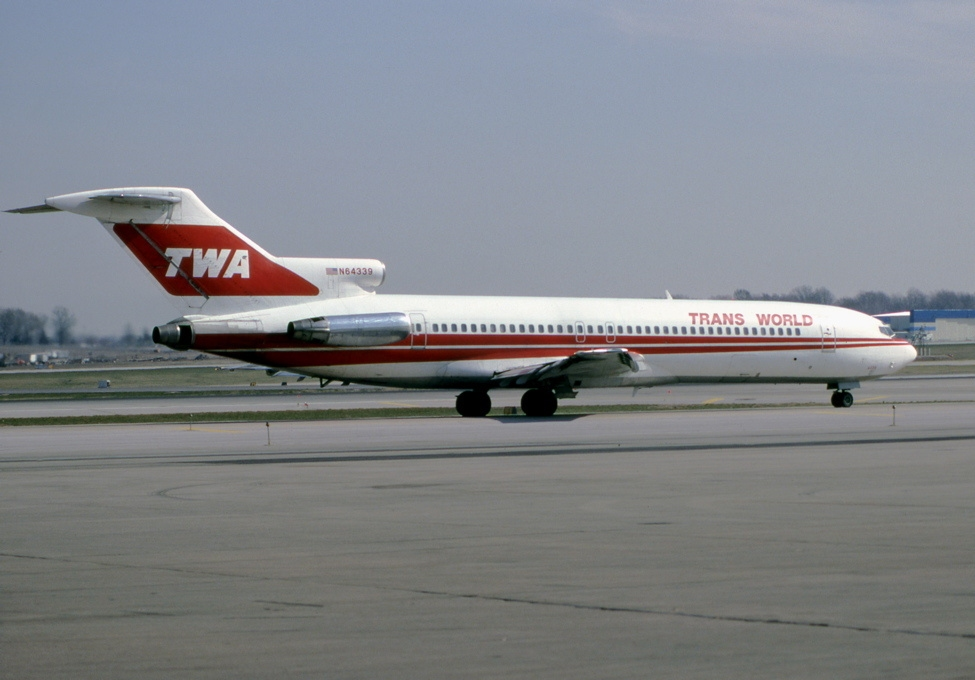
- N64339, the aircraft involved in the hijacking, in 1987

Hijacking
- Date: June 14, 1985
- Summary: Hijacking
- Site: Greek airspace

Aircraft
- Aircraft type: Boeing 727–231
- Operator: Trans World Airlines
- Call sign: TWA 847
- Registration: N64339
- Flight origin: Cairo International Airport, Egypt
- 1st stopover: Ellinikon International Airport, Greece
- 2nd stopover: Leonardo da Vinci International Airport, Italy
- 3rd stopover: Logan International Airport, United States
- 4th stopover: Los Angeles International Airport, United States
- Destination: San Diego International Airport, United States
- Occupants: 155
- Passengers: 147 (including 2 hijackers)
- Crew: 8
- Fatalities: 1
- Survivors: 154

TWA Flight 847 was a regularly scheduled Trans World Airlines flight from Cairo to San Diego with en route stops in Athens, Rome, Boston, and Los Angeles. On the morning of June 14, 1985, Flight 847 was hijacked soon after takeoff from Athens. The Hezbollah hijackers demanded the release of a total of 766 Shia Muslims from Israeli custody and took the plane repeatedly to Beirut and Algiers. As of 2023, Hezbollah continues to deny involvement.

The hijacking and subsequent hostage situation played out over the course of 17 days, during which the aircraft crisscrossed the Mediterranean. Many passengers were tied up and beaten, and those with Jewish-sounding names were separated from the others. United States Navy diver Robert Stethem was murdered, and his body was thrown onto the Beirut airport apron. The ordeal finally ended after some of the hijackers' demands had been met and they agreed to release all remaining hostages. Many believed that due to the lawless nature of Lebanon at the time the captors would go unpunished.

== Hijacking events ==
All times are in Algiers time unless otherwise noted

Flight 847 was operated with a Boeing 727–200, registration N64339. The flight originated in Cairo on the morning of June 14.

=== Day one (June 14) ===
After an uneventful flight from Cairo to Athens, a new crew boarded Flight 847. The new crew in Athens consisted of Captain John Testrake, First Officer Phil Maresca, Flight Engineer Christian Zimmerman, flight service manager Uli Derickson, and flight attendants Judy Cox, Hazel Hesp, Elizabeth Howes, and Helen Sheahan.

==== 10:10 a.m. (EET) ====
Flight 847 departed Athens for Rome as scheduled. It was hijacked soon after takeoff by two Arabic-speaking Lebanese men who had smuggled a pistol and two grenades through the Athens airport security. One was later identified as Mohammed Ali Hammadi, a member of Hezbollah.

The hijackers assaulted flight service manager Derickson, dragged her by her hair, breached the cockpit, then proceeded to attack and pistol-whip Testrake, Maresca, and Zimmerman.

While still in Greek airspace and with Captain Testrake being held at gunpoint, the hijackers forced the airplane to divert from its original destination of Rome towards the Middle East.

==== 11:55 a.m. (EET) ====
The hijacked plane made its first stop at the Beirut International Airport in Lebanon.

Shortly before they were allowed to land, Captain Testrake argued with the local air traffic control. They initially refused to let the plane land in Beirut, but later relented. When the air traffic controller tried to talk to the hijackers, Testrake interrupted, saying, 'He has pulled a hand-grenade pin and he is ready to blow up the aircraft if he has to. We must, I repeat, we must land at Beirut. We must land at Beirut. No alternative.' At the time, Lebanon was in the midst of the Lebanese Civil War, and Beirut was divided into sectors controlled by different Shia Amal militia and Hezbollah.

They remained in Beirut for several hours. Nineteen passengers were allowed to leave in exchange for fuel.

The aircraft departed Beirut at 1:30 p.m.

==== 3:30 p.m. (CET) ====
After crossing the Mediterranean Sea, the aircraft landed at the Algiers International Airport in Algeria. During their five-hour stop in Algiers, the hijackers issued their demands, including:

- Release of the 'Kuwait 17' group who had been involved in the 1983 bombings of the U.S. embassy in Kuwait.
- Release of all 766 (mainly Lebanese) Shias who had been transferred to Israel's Atleat Prison, in conjunction with immediate withdrawal of Israeli forces from southern Lebanon.
- International condemnation of Israel and the United States.

Twenty-one more passengers were released before the plane took off again. The plane with its remaining 115 occupants (105 passengers, 8 crew members, and 2 hijackers) took off at 8:25 p.m. and headed towards Beirut.

=== Day two (June 15) ===
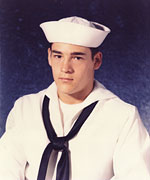
Robert Stethem

As Beirut International Airport was surrounded by the sea on one side, and a Shia neighborhood on the other, it had no perimeter security. It was possible to simply drive onto the runway from the nearby residential area. That is exactly what happened after the plane landed, and the airport became overrun by Islamist militias.

==== 2:20 a.m. (EET) ====
The aircraft arrived in Beirut for the second time.

The hijackers had systematically and regularly beaten all military passengers. During this stop, they selected U.S. Navy Seabee Robert Stethem, beat him, shot him in the right temple, dumped his corpse onto the tarmac, then shot him again.

During the stopover, seven American passengers, alleged to have Jewish-sounding surnames, were forced to deplane. They were taken to a Shia prison in Beirut, while an additional 12 terrorists boarded the flight.

The airplane departed Beirut again at 5:40 a.m. with 119 people on board (97 passengers, 8 crew members, 14 terrorists).

There is some discrepancy between sources as to when the Stethem incident occurred, with some sources indicating it took place during the first stop in Beirut, while others suggested it had occurred during the second. Overall, more reliable sources seem to agree the murder took place during the second stop.

==== 7:50 a.m. (CET) ====
Flight 847 returned to Algiers and stayed there for the next 25 hours.

The terrorists released three hostages from the aircraft shortly after landing. Algerian officials then boarded the plane to begin negotiations with the terrorists.

The Greek government released an accomplice to the hijackers, Ali Atwa, who was flown to Algiers and joined other terrorists on the plane. In exchange, the hijackers released eight Greek citizens, including Greek popular singer Demis Roussos, who were then flown on a Greek government business jet from Algiers back to Athens.

After further negotiations, another 58 hostages (53 passengers and all 5 female cabin crew members) were released in Algiers.

=== Day three (June 16) ===
==== 12:45 p.m. (EET) ====
Around 8:45 a.m. (CET), the plane left Algiers one last time, with 54 people on board (36 passengers, 3 crew members, 15 terrorists).

The aircraft arrived in Beirut and remained there for the remainder of the crisis.

After landing, the remaining 36 passengers and 3 crew members were removed from the plane and kept captive in a Shia prison in Beirut, together with the seven American passengers who had been brought there a day earlier.

=== Days four through seventeen ===
Nabih Berri, the chief of Amal militia and the minister of justice in the fractured Lebanon cabinet, negotiated on behalf of the terrorists.

One of the hostages was released on 26 June, after he had developed heart trouble.

The last 45 hostages were released on June 30 (they gathered in a schoolyard in a Muslim-controlled suburb of Beirut, before being transported to safety) after an intervention by U.S. President Ronald Reagan and Lebanese officials. The intervention involved a settlement negotiated by Abraham Sofaer, the Legal Advisor to Reagan's State Department, in which the hostages were released in exchange for Israeli release of Lebanese prisoners. Sofaer argued that this action did not constitute acquiescence to the terrorists' demands because the U.S. had objected to Israel’s imprisonment of Lebanese prisoners prior to the incident. The released hostages then met with international journalists and were driven to Syria by the International Red Cross. They held a press conference at the Sheraton Hotel in Damascus.

The hostages then boarded a U.S. Air Force C-141B Starlifter cargo plane and flew to Rhein-Main AB, Hesse, West Germany, where they were met by U.S. Vice President George H. W. Bush, debriefed, given medical examinations, then flown to Andrews Air Force Base in Maryland, and welcomed home by President Reagan.

Over the following several weeks, Israel released over 700 Shia prisoners, while maintaining that the prisoners' release was not related to the hijacking.

== Aftermath ==
Nationality	Passengers	Crew	Total
Australia	3	0	3
France	8	1	9
Greece	15	0	15
Italy	11	0	11
United Kingdom	24	0	24
United States	84	7	91
Total	145	8	153

A famous image of this hijacking was a photograph showing a gun being held near Captain Testrake, sticking out of the cockpit window, while he and the other pilots were being interviewed by ABC News reporter Charles Glass. The scene was interrupted by one of the French-speaking Hezbollah guards left by the hijackers to hold the crew after most passengers and the cabin crew had been released in Algiers, and the remaining men were held in captivity elsewhere in Beirut. The young militiaman may have unloaded the gun before entering the scene, as he primarily wanted to be on television.

Flight attendant Uli Derickson was credited with calming one of the hijackers during a fuel-quantity incident during the first leg to Beirut, because she spoke German, the only European language which either hijacker spoke. Notably, she interrupted an attempt to end the hijacking in Algiers when airport officials refused to refuel the plane without payment by offering her own Shell Oil credit card, which was used to charge about $5,500 for 22,700 L (6,000 gal) of jet fuel, for which she was reimbursed. She also refused to cooperate with the hijackers in identifying for them the passports of any passengers with Jewish-sounding names so they could not be singled out.

USS Stethem, an Arleigh Burke-class destroyer commissioned in 1995, was named in memory of Robert Stethem. The aircraft involved in the hijacking was put back into service. It remained in service for TWA until the aircraft was retired on September 30, 2000. It ceremoniously operated the airline's final revenue flight of their Boeing 727 fleet.

=== Alleged perpetrators ===
Hezbollah specialist Magnus Ranstorp of the University of St Andrews credits "leading" Hezbollah members Hassan Izz-Al-Din (later involved with the Kuwait Airways Flight 422 hijacking in 1988) and Mohammed Ali Hammadi, whose brother was one of the commanders of the Hezbollah Special Security Apparatus, with assisting Hezbollah operatives in the "supervision and planning of the incident itself and as an active participant in the defusion and resolution".

On October 10, 2001, in the immediate aftermath of 9/11, three of the alleged hijackers, Imad Mughniyeh, Ali Atwa, and Hassan Izz-Al-Din, having been indicted earlier in United States district courts for the 1985 skyjacking of the American airliner, were among the original 22 fugitives announced by President George W. Bush to be placed on the newly formed FBI Most Wanted Terrorists list. Rewards of $5 million for information resulting in the arrest and conviction of Atwa and Izz-Al-Din are still being offered by the United States.

Mohammed Ali Hammadi was arrested in 1987 in Frankfurt, West Germany, while attempting to smuggle liquid explosives, 19 months after the TWA Flight 847 attack. In addition to the West German charge of illegal importation of explosives, he was tried and convicted of Stethem's murder and was sentenced to life in prison. However, he was paroled and released by German officials on December 20, 2005, and returned to Lebanon. There has been speculation that his parole was granted as part of a covert prisoner swap, in exchange for the release of Susanne Osthoff. Taken hostage in Iraq a month prior, Osthoff was released the week of Hammadi's parole. On February 14, 2006 the United States formally asked the Lebanese government to extradite Mohammed Ali Hammadi for Stethem's murder. On February 24, 2006, he appeared as well on the FBI Most Wanted Terrorists list, with the name Mohammed Ali "Hamadei" (sic). He was among the second group of indicted fugitives to be named by the FBI to the list.

Imad Mughniyeh was assassinated on the night of 12 February 2008 by a car bomb explosion in Syria on February 13, 2008. The remaining three fugitives from TWA Flight 847 remain on the list, and at large.

In 2019, Greek police arrested a 65-year-old Lebanese man who was accused of involvement in the hijacking, but he was released after police determined it was a case of mistaken identity.

Hezbollah reportedly denies culpability in the TWA Flight 847 hijacking, among its denials of numerous other attacks that have been attributed to the group.

== Film ==
- The Delta Force film of 1986 is based on the TWA 847 hijacking.
- The Taking of Flight 847: The Uli Derickson Story is a 1988 TV movie based on the incident focusing on the role of flight attendant Uli Derickson (played by Lindsay Wagner).

== See also ==
- Trans World Airlines Flight 106
