= USS Stethem =

American Destroyer named after Robert Stethem

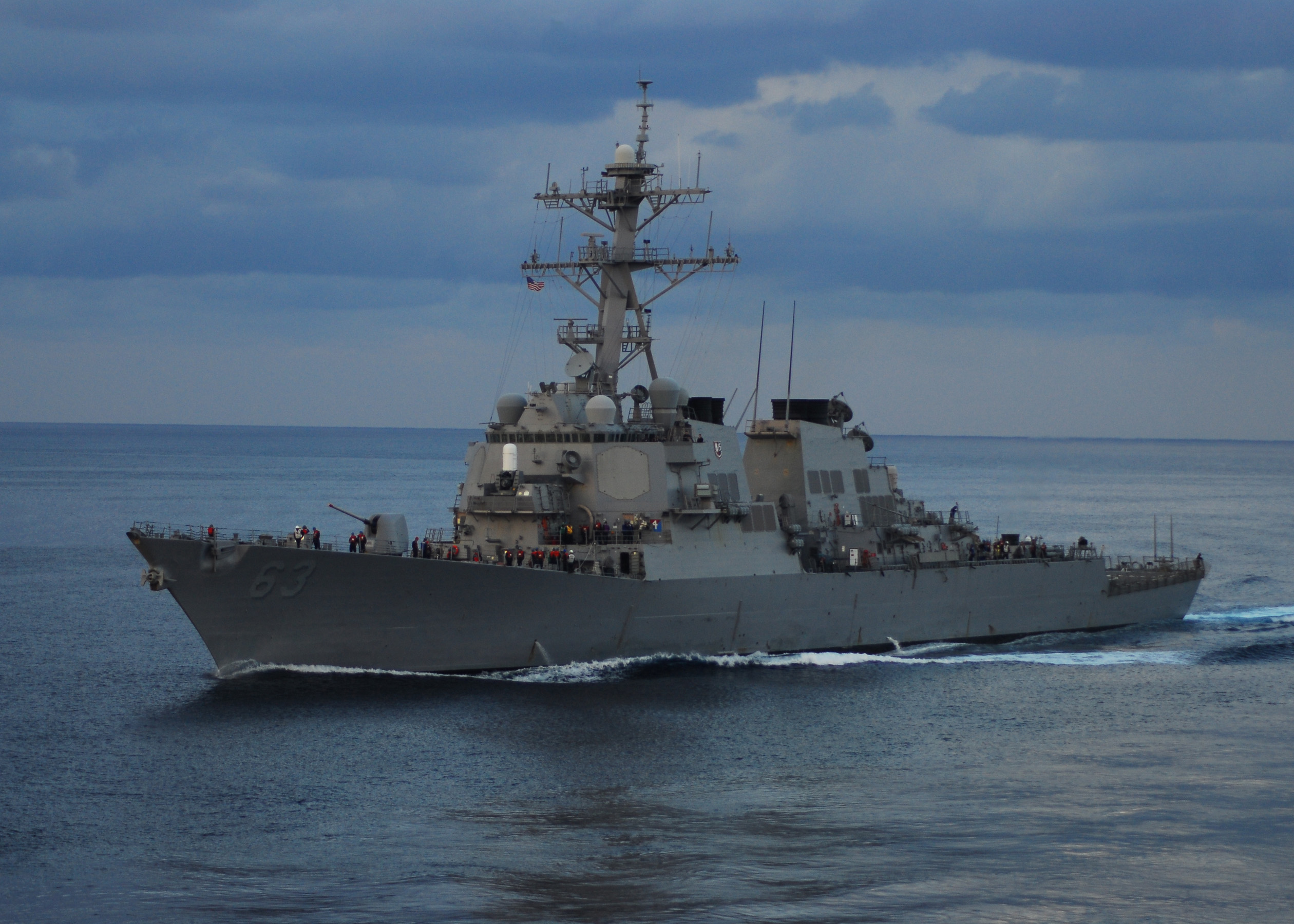
- USS Stethem on 7 December 2010

History

United States
- Name: Stethem
- Namesake: Robert Stethem
- Ordered: 22 February 1990
- Builder: Ingalls Shipbuilding
- Laid down: 11 May 1993
- Launched: 17 June 1994
- Commissioned: 21 October 1995
- Home port: San Diego
- Identification: MMSI number: 338831000; Callsign: NCBD; Hull number: DDG-63
- Motto: Steadfast And Courageous
- Nickname(s): The Steel Worker
- Status: in active service
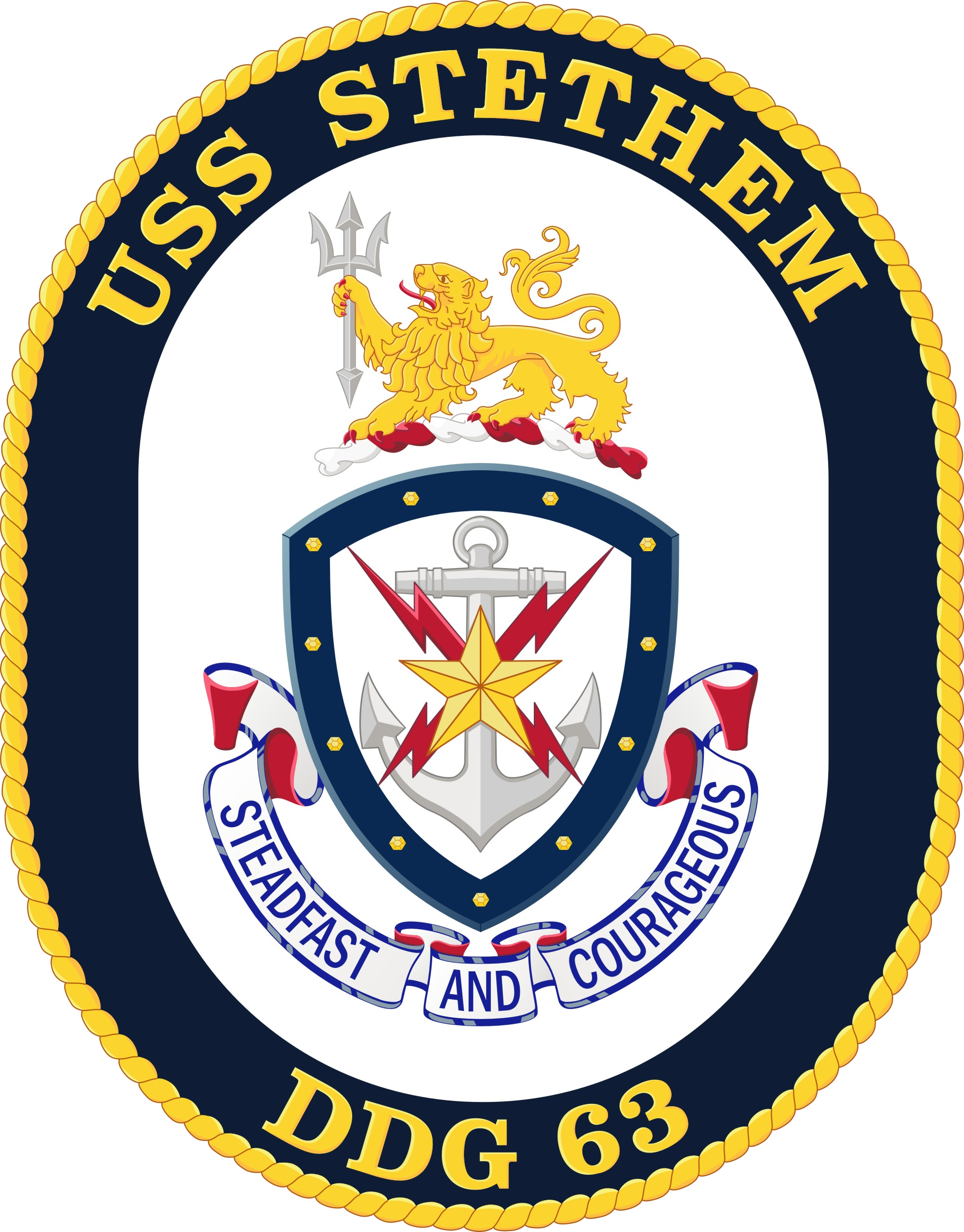
- Badge

General characteristics
- Class & type: Arleigh Burke-class destroyer
- Displacement: Light: approx. 6,800 long tons (6,900 t); Full: approx. 8,900 long tons (9,000 t)
- Length: 505 ft (154 m)
- Beam: 59 ft (18 m)
- Draft: 31 ft (9.4 m)
- Propulsion: 2 × shafts
- Speed: In excess of 30 kn (56 km/h; 35 mph)
- Range: 4,400 nmi (8,100 km; 5,100 mi) at 20 kn (37 km/h; 23 mph)
- Complement: 33 commissioned officers; 38 chief petty officers; 210 enlisted personnel
- Sensors & processing systems: AN/SPY-1D PESA 3D radar (Flight I, II, IIA); AN/SPY-6(V)1 AESA 3D radar (Flight III); AN/SPS-67(V)3 or (V)5 surface search radar (DDG-51 – DDG-118); AN/SPQ-9B surface search radar (DDG-119 onward); AN/SPS-73(V)12 surface search/navigation radar (DDG-51 – DDG-86); BridgeMaster E surface search/navigation radar (DDG-87 onward); 3 × AN/SPG-62 fire-control radar; Mk 46 optical sight system (Flight I, II, IIA); Mk 20 electro-optical sight system (Flight III); AN/SQQ-89 ASW combat system: AN/SQS-53C sonar array; AN/SQR-19 tactical towed array sonar (Flight I, II, IIA); TB-37U multi-function towed array sonar (DDG-113 onward); AN/SQQ-28 LAMPS III shipboard system
- Electronic warfare & decoys: AN/SLQ-32 electronic warfare suite; AN/SLQ-25 Nixie torpedo countermeasures; Mk 36 Mod 12 decoy launching systems; Mk 53 Nulka decoy launching systems; Mk 59 decoy launching systems
- Armament: Guns: 1 × 5-inch (127 mm)/54 mk 45 mod 1/2 (lightweight gun); 2 × 20 mm (0.8 in) Phalanx CIWS; 2 × 25 mm (0.98 in) Mk 38 machine gun system; 4 × 0.50 inches (12.7 mm) caliber guns; Missiles: 2 × Mk 141 Harpoon anti-ship missile launcher; 1 × 29-cell, 1 × 61-cell (90 total cells) Mk 41 vertical launching system (VLS): RIM-66M surface-to-air missile; RIM-156 surface-to-air missile; BGM-109 Tomahawk cruise missile; RUM-139 vertical launch ASROC; Torpedoes: 2 × Mark 32 triple torpedo tubes: Mark 46 lightweight torpedo; Mark 50 lightweight torpedo; Mark 54 lightweight torpedo
- Aircraft carried: 1 × Sikorsky MH-60R

USS Stethem (DDG-63) is an Arleigh Burke-class (Flight I) Aegis guided missile destroyer in the United States Navy. The ship was built in Pascagoula, Mississippi, starting on 11 May 1993. She was commissioned on 21 October 1995. She is part of the Pacific Fleet, assigned to Destroyer Squadron 9. The Stethem was named for Steelworker 2nd Class Robert Stethem. He was a Seabee diver killed by Shiite hijackers onboard TWA 847 at Beirut International Airport in 1985.

== Ship history ==
Stethem is the 13th Arleigh Burke-class Aegis destroyer. Construction of Stethem began on 18 May 1992 with the ship's keel being laid down at the Ingalls Shipbuilding Division of Litton Industries in Pascagoula, Mississippi on 11 May 1993. She was launched on 17 June 1994 and was christened on 16 July 1994 by Mrs. Patricia L. Stethem, the mother of the ship's namesake. The vessel then transited the Panama Canal and was officially commissioned on 21 October 1995 at the Naval Construction Battalion Center Port Hueneme. On 15 February 1996 she successfully completed her Post Delivery Test and Trials and was thus cleared for combat operations.

=== 1996: Rescue mission ===
On 23 November 1996 the ship was diverted for a Search and Rescue mission to recover survivors from a downed U.S. Air Force C-130 off the coast of northern California. In the company of two smaller boats Stethem patrolled the area around the crash for some twenty hours while engaged in recovery efforts, which earned the destroyer the U.S. Coast Guard Meritorious Unit Commendation Medal. She was additionally recognized for her achievements during her first year of service by earning the 1996 Destroyer Squadron Twenty-One Battle Efficiency Award.

=== 1997: First deployment ===
On 4 April 1997 Stethem set sail for the Persian Gulf on her maiden overseas deployment, reporting for duty in Bahrain on 3 July. During the next three months she served in a variety of roles including the primary Air Warfare Commander, Surface Warfare Commander, Ready Strike Platform, and LINK Coordinator. She also provided support to both the USS Constellation and the USS John F. Kennedy Carrier Battle Groups (CBG) and several U.S. Air Force aircraft engaged in Operation Southern Watch. She also supported the United Nations Security Council resolutions against Iraq by conducting some 54 boardings and inspections of suspected sanctions violators.

Stethem's port visits during her deployment included Singapore, Malaysia, Bahrain, Oman, the United Arab Emirates, Fremantle and Sydney. She finally returned to San Diego on 7 November 1997 to begin an inter-deployment training cycle, the second one undertaken by the ship.

Beginning with a Command Assessment of Readiness for Training (CART II) in May 1998, Stethem's crew trained in combat systems, navigation, engineering, mobility, damage control, and logistics management. Her training teams' mission readiness commitment resulted in the validation of all the Final Evaluation Period objectives during the Tailored Shipboard Training Availability Phase III (TSTA III) – a first for any surface combatant.

=== 1999: Second deployment ===
Stethem began her second deployment to the Persian Gulf 16 April 1999, sailing as part of the Middle East Force 99-2. After port visits to Guam, Saipan, Singapore, and Thailand, she reported for duty in the Persian Gulf conducting freedom of navigation operations and maritime interception operations. During her 76 days on station she served as an Air Warfare Commander, a Ready Strike Platform, and a Force Over-The-Horizon Track Coordinator. Stethem also had the opportunity to support the Theodore Roosevelt CBG as a carrier escort and a plane guard. After serving as command ship for Northern Persian Gulf Maritime Interception Operations for a second time, she transited the Strait of Hormuz on 13 August, and arrived home in San Diego 4 October 1999.

In January 2000, Stethem was honored for her achievements and was once more awarded with the 1999 Destroyer Squadron Twenty-One Battle Efficiency Award. She was the recipient of the Raytheon CIWS Award, the Pacific Force Retention Award, and the Safety Award.

In mid-September 2000, during a port visit in San Francisco, Stethem was called out to sea by the Joint Interagency Task Force West to escort the fishing vessel Gran Tauro to San Diego. Gran Tauro had been caught with over five metric tons of uncut cocaine aboard, with a total net worth of over $500 million. After completing this escort the ship returned to conducting final preparations for her next deployment.

=== 2001: Third deployment ===
On 13 January 2001 she departed on her third deployment to the Persian Gulf, this time as part of MEF 01-1. After port visits to Hawaii, Guam, Oman, Darwin and Cairns, Australia, American Samoa, Singapore, and Thailand, Stethem reported to the United States Fifth Fleet on 28 February 2001. During her 68 days on station in the Persian Gulf she conducted maritime interception operations, served as the Air Warfare Commander, supported Operation Southern Watch, served as a Ready Strike Platform, and participated in two international naval exercises; Exercise Arabian Gauntlet and Exercise Neon Falcon. During her maritime interception operations Stethem successfully intercepted the motor vessel Diamond, which resulted in the third largest arrest of an oil-smuggling sanctions violator since the Persian Gulf War. Stethem also escorted the aircraft carrier USS Harry S. Truman through the Strait of Hormuz on 27 April before departing for the United States. The ship arrived home in San Diego on 28 June 2001.

==== 9/11 and maintenance ====
After a Post-Overseas Movement Stand-down, Stethem supported the aircraft carrier USS John C. Stennis and her Carrier Battle Group as an opposing force during their final battle problem. In early September she went through U.S. Navy Board of Inspection and Survey inspections (INSURV). She was conducting her INSURV on 11 September 2001 when terrorists attacked New York City and Washington, D.C., and shortly thereafter, Stethem was called into station in support of Operation Noble Eagle and tasked with conducting air surveillance of the approaches to San Diego and providing air defense coverage to shipping.

On 30 September 2001, Stethem entered into drydock for her third Selective Restricted Availability (SRA) at the Southwest Marine and Continental Maritime shipyards in San Diego. The purpose of this nine-week availability was the installation of equipment enhancements and quality of life upgrades. Stethem was also selected for the testing of the Tactical Tomahawk Weapons Control System (TTWCS). She departed drydock on 30 October 2001, and was again moved to the Continental Maritime Shipyard in San Diego. Her return to Naval Station San Diego on 6 December 2001 marked the end of the 9.4 million dollar refurbishment and refitting period. The destroyer got underway the following week to begin the work up for her next deployment, and on 14 December, she began her holiday leave and stand down period.

=== 2002: Fourth deployment and periodic training ===
The crew assembled in mid-January 2002 to continue efforts in support of her Inter-Deployment Training Cycle (IDTC) and Tactical Tomahawk testing. In early February, Stethem anchored off the coast of Puerto Vallarta, Mexico; this was the first foreign port visit by any U.S. naval combatant since the terrorist attacks on 11 September 2001.

In the ensuing months Stethem embarked on her third Inter-Deployment Training Cycle and served as Command Destroyer, Squadron 23's flagship throughout the month of February. In March, Stethem completed the Command Assessment of Readiness for Training II (CART II). Between the weeks of 1 April and 3 May 2002, Stethem completed the Tailored Ship's Training Availability period. On 6 May Stethem served as the opposition forces for the Abraham Lincoln Carrier Battle Group's Joint Task Force Exercise (JTFEX).

In early June 2002, Stethem earned her seventh Engineering Command excellence award as a result of her performance during the Engineering Underway Demonstration. Starting 8 July, she commenced a five-day supply management assessment which was upgraded to an inspection because of her exemplary combat logistics readiness. Returning to the site of her commissioning at the end of July, Stethem took part in the 60th Anniversary of Seabee Days in Port Hueneme, California, in honor of her namesake. She then transited to Everett, Washington, embarked families and friends for the short transit to participate in the Seattle Seafair festival. On 12 September 2002, Stethem was chosen to lead the Parade of Sail into San Diego Bay. In the beginning of October, Stethem docked at Broadway Pier as part of San Diego's Fleet Week celebration. While at Broadway Pier, Stethem hosted the first public Navy ship tours in San Diego since the 11 September attacks. Soon afterward, on 16 October, Stethem successfully launched the first Tomahawk Cruise Missile using the new Tactical Tomahawk Weapons Control System (TTWCS). At the end of October, Stethem once again played the role of opposition force, this time for the Constellation CBG.

In January 2003, Stethem played the opposition force role for the Nimitz CBG. On 5 February 2003, Stethem returned to Puerto Vallarta, Mexico, for another port visit. Working with the San Diego and Puerto Vallarta Navy League Chapters, Stethem delivered medical equipment for distribution to handicapped residents of Puerto Vallarta. The crew also painted the local library frequented by many of Puerto Vallarta's school children. On 5 April 2003, Stethem successfully performed the first ever surface ship launch of a Block IV Tactical Tomahawk cruise missile, bringing it one step closer to fleet introduction. This was followed up on 8 May with the first surface ship launch of a Block IV Tactical Tomahawk cruise missile with a live warhead. After the missile left the launcher, Stethem's strike team became the first to demonstrate Tactical Tomahawk's post launch execution capability when they redirected the missile in flight. Both the team and the missile performed without error, destroying the intended target on San Clemente Island after over 2 hours and 700 miles of missile flight.

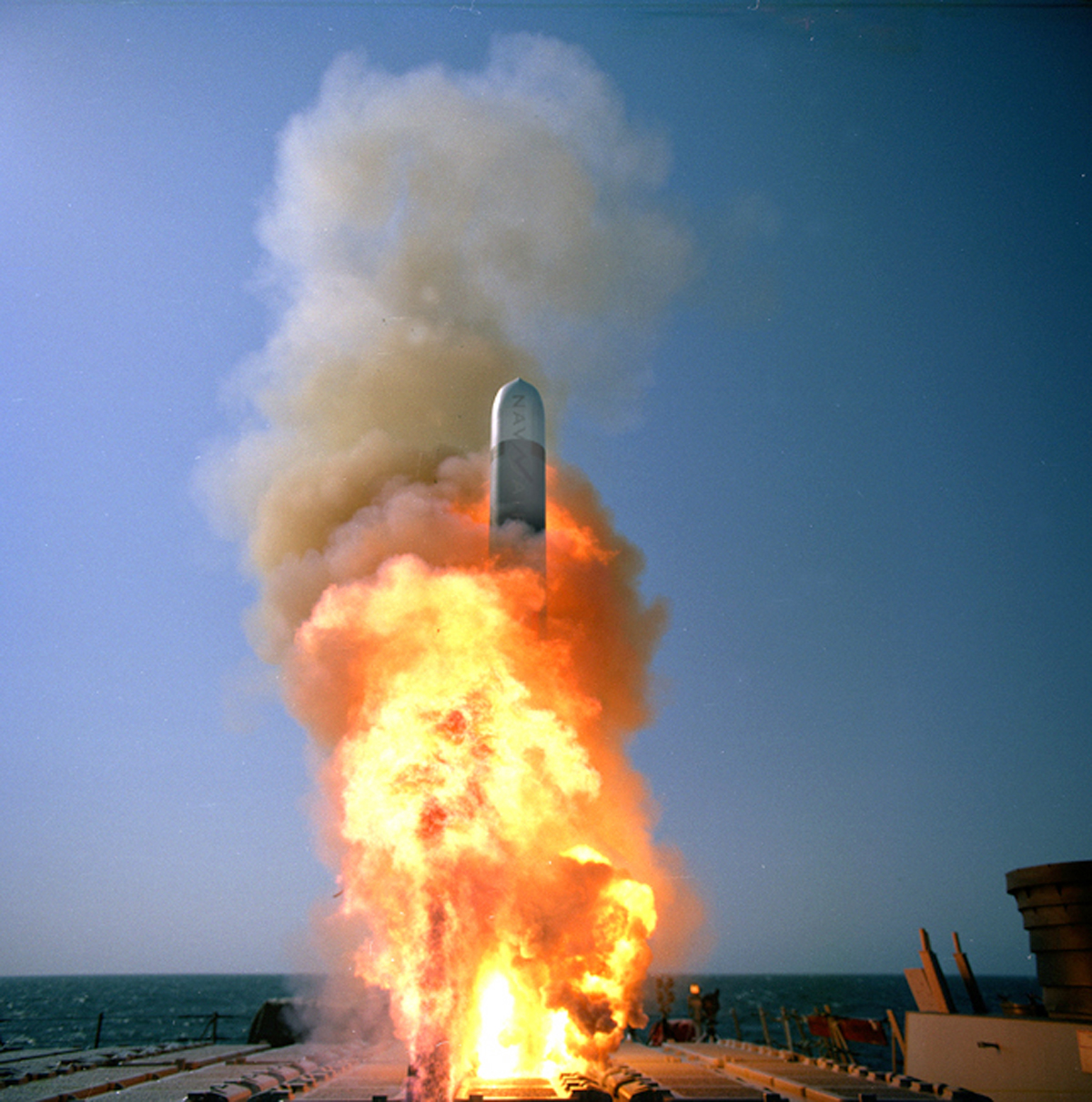
Stethem launches a Tomahawk, May 2003

On 14 May 2003, after a two-week intermediate maintenance availability, Stethem sailed in support of a different kind of missile-firing exercise. During this exercise Stethem's air warfare team engaged two airborne targets with Standard Missiles. After this successful engagement, Stethem celebrated by transiting north to make post calls at Juneau, Alaska and Victoria, British Columbia.

Returning from her trek up North in June, Stethem rested for one week and then put back to sea to serve as the opposition force against Pacific Fleet's first Expeditionary Strike Group, which was headed up by amphibious assault ship USS Peleliu.

=== 2017: Man overboard ===
On 2 July 2017, Stethem sailed within 12 nautical miles (22 km; 14 mi) of Triton Island in the South China Sea while conducting freedom of navigation exercises. On 1 August 2017, while on routine patrol 140 miles (230 km) west of Subic Bay, Philippines, one of Stethem's sailors was reported missing and presumed to have gone overboard. U.S. Navy and Military Sealift Command ships were joined by ships and aircraft from the navies of China and Japan in an extensive search and rescue effort. On 4 August 2017, after searching for 79 hours and covering 10,000 square miles without success, the search was called off.

== Awards ==
- Navy Unit Commendation - (Oct 2023 - May 2024)
- Marjorie Sterrett Battleship Fund Award - (2012)
