= Ken Roberts (politician) =

American politician (born 1963)

Ken A. Roberts

Member of the Idaho House of Representatives from 8th district
- In office December 1, 2000 – July 2012
- Preceded by: Christian Zimmermann
- Succeeded by: Terry Gestrin

Personal details
- Born: August 5, 1963 (age 62) Cascade, Idaho, U.S.
- Party: Republican

Ken A. Roberts (born August 5, 1963) is an American politician who served as a member of the Idaho House of Representatives from 2000 to 2012. He later served as chairman of the Idaho State Tax Commission until April 2019.

== Early life and education ==
Roberts was born in Cascade, Idaho. He attended Boise State University, Moody Bible Institute, and the University of Idaho.

== Elections ==
- 2012 Roberts won the three-way May 15, 2012, Republican primary, winning with 3,290 votes (44.9%), facing Democratic nominee Karla Miller for the general election on November 6, 2012.
- 2000 When Republican Representative Christian Zimmermann left the District 8 A seat open, Roberts won the May 23, 2000, Republican primary with 5,901 votes (81.8%) against Lloyd Blackmer, winning the November 7, 2000, general election with 10,732 votes (69.8%) against Jerry Lockhart (D).
- 2002 Unopposed for the May 28, 2002, Republican primary, Roberts won with 4,963 votes; Lockhart was unopposed in the Democratic primary, setting up a rematch. Roberts won the November 5, 2002, general election with 8,314 votes (60.5%) against Lockhart.
- 2004 Unopposed for the May 25, 2004, Republican primary, Roberts won with 5,565 votes, and won the November 2, 2004, general election with 10,058 votes (57.4%) against Darcy James (D).
- 2006 Unopposed for the May 23, 2006, Republican primary, Roberts won with 4,158 votes; James was unopposed for the Democratic primary, setting up a rematch. Roberts won the November 7, 2006, general election with 7,655 votes (53.00%) against James.
- 2008 Unopposed for the May 27, 2008, Republican primary, Roberts won with 4,282 votes, and won the November 4, 2008, general election with 11,043 votes (59.7%) against Richard Adams (D).
- 2010 Roberts won the May 25, 2010, Republican primary with 4,397 votes (69.6%) against Gordon Conrad, and was unopposed for the November 2, 2010, general election, winning with 11,486 votes.
