= Terry Gestrin =

American politician from Idaho

Member of the Idaho House of Representatives from 8th district
- In office August 2, 2012 – December 1, 2022
- Preceded by: Ken Roberts
- Succeeded by: Matthew Bundy (redistricting)

Personal details
- Born: Cascade, Idaho, U.S.
- Party: Republican
- Education: Idaho State University (BBA)

Terry F. Gestrin is an American politician who served as a member of the Idaho House of Representatives from the 8th district. He assumed office on August 2, 2012.

== Early life and education ==
Gestrin was born in Cascade, Idaho. He earned a Bachelor of Business Administration degree in finance from Idaho State University.

== Career ==
After redistricting in 2012, Gestrin sought the 8th district seat in the Idaho Senate but was defeated in the May 2012 Republican primary by then-Representative Steven Thayn.

When Representative Ken Roberts was appointed to the Idaho State Tax Commission later in July, the Legislative District 8 Republican Central Committee selected Gestrin to take Roberts' place on the general election ballot for Seat A.

Governor Otter appointed Gestrin to serve the remainder of Roberts' term.

=== Committee assignments ===
- Education Committee
- Resources and Conservation Committee
- Transportation and Defense Committee

== Elections ==
District 8 Senate - Boise, Custer, Gem, Lemhi, and Valley Counties
Year	Candidate	Votes	Pct	Candidate	Votes	Pct	Candidate	Votes	Pct
2012 Primary	Terry Gestrin	2,053	27.6%	Steven Thayn	3,312	44.6%	Alan Ward	2,065	27.8%

District 8 House Seat A - Boise, Custer, Gem, Lemhi, and Valley Counties
Year	Candidate	Votes	Pct	Candidate	Votes	Pct
2012 General	Terry Gestrin (incumbent)	13,894	67.9%	Karla Miller	7,405	34.8%
2014 Primary	Terry Gestrin (incumbent)	4,443	62.9%	Ernest Walker	2,618	37.1%
2014 General	Terry Gestrin (incumbent)	12,848	99.1%	Ammon Prolife (W/I)	111	0.9%
2016 Primary	Terry Gestrin (incumbent)	5,999	100%			
2016 General	Terry Gestrin (incumbent)	16,745	74.1%	Jocelyn Plass	5,864	25.9%
