= David Yewdall =

American supervising sound editor

- Born: David Lewis Yewdall; October 30, 1950; Springfield, Missouri, U.S.
- Died: July 4, 2017 (aged 66); Winston-Salem, North Carolina, U.S.
- Occupation: Supervising sound editor
- Years active: 1978–2016
- Notable work: The Thing, The Fifth Element, Escape from New York

David Lewis Yewdall (October 30, 1950 – July 4, 2017) was an American supervising sound editor. He worked with Roger Corman on Battle Beyond the Stars, and for Paul Mazursky as supervising sound editor on Moscow on the Hudson, and as the co-supervising sound editor on Talvisota. In 1999, he published The Practical Art of Motion Picture Sound, which was called a "must-read for all students of film." In 1996, he became a member of the board of NightPro Technologies Inc (NTI), a sound production company from Provo, Utah. He taught editing and sound at the University of North Carolina School of the Arts until June 2016.

== Awards and recognition ==
In 1988, Yewdall was nominated for a Primetime Emmy Award for "Outstanding Sound Editing for a Miniseries or a Special" for his work on The Taking of Flight 847: The Uli Derickson Story.

== Death ==
Yewdall died on July 4, 2017, in Winston-Salem, North Carolina from pancreatic cancer, aged 66.

== Publications ==
- Yewdall, David Lewis (2007). Practical art of motion picture sound. Focal Press. p. 412. ISBN 978-0-240-80865-9.
