= Mohammed Ali Hammadi =

Lebanese terrorist (1964–2025)

Mohammed Ali Hamadei (Arabic: محمد علي حمادي), also known as Mohammed Ali Hamadi (13 June 1964 – 21 January 2025), was a Lebanese terrorist who was on the FBI's Most Wanted Terrorists list, being most notable for being the lead hijacker in the TWA Flight 847 hijacking. A member of Hezbollah, he was convicted in a West German court of law of air piracy, murder, and possession of explosives for his part in the 14 June 1985 hijacking of TWA Flight 847.

Under indictment by US law enforcement for crimes related to the same hijacking, during which one passenger, US Navy Seabee diver Robert Stethem, was extensively tortured prior to being murdered, Hamadei was sentenced to life imprisonment by the West German court. He was imprisoned in 1987 in West Germany for 19 years, but was paroled in 2005. He was considered a fugitive by the United States Department of Justice, which listed him as one of the FBI's Most Wanted Terrorists in 2006.

There has been speculation that his parole was granted as part of a covert prisoner swap, in exchange for the release of Susanne Osthoff. Taken hostage in Iraq a month prior, Osthoff was released the week of Hamadei's parole.

== Imprisoned in West Germany ==
On January 13, 1987, 19 months after the TWA Flight 847 attack, Hamadei was arrested in Frankfurt, West Germany, while attempting to smuggle liquid explosives. The United States immediately requested his extradition, but Hezbollah immediately abducted two West Germans in Beirut and threatened to kill them if Hamadei were to be extradited. It was then decided to try Hamadei in West Germany. In addition to the charges in West Germany of illegal importation of explosives, he was charged with the 1985 hijacking and hostage taking. On May 17, 1989, he was convicted of Stethem's 1985 murder, and sentenced to life in prison.

In Germany, the first opportunity for parole to be granted on a life sentence is ordinarily after 15 years. However, Hamadei's life sentence included a provision that due to an exceptionally grave crime, the first parole review could not be held at the 15-year mark. On 30 November 2005, the Landgericht (regional court) in Kleve decided to grant Hamadei's application for parole, after he had served almost 19 years of his term. The US government has sought his extradition from Lebanon.

== Fugitive in Lebanon ==
His indicted accomplices in the TWA Flight 847 attack, Hassan Izz-Al-Din and Ali Atwa, continue to elude arrest and currently remain at large, having been placed among the original 22 fugitives on the FBI's Most Wanted Terrorists list on 10 October 2001, in the immediate aftermath of 9/11.

On 14 February 2006, the United States federal government, through the ambassador to Lebanon, formally asked the Lebanese government to extradite Mohammed Ali Hamadei for the murder of Robert Stethem during the 1985 hijacking. On 24 February 2006, he joined his accomplices on the FBI's Most Wanted Terrorists list, under the name Mohammed Ali Hamadei.

Several news outlets reported the announcement by Hezbollah of the death of Imad Mugniyah by an explosion in Damascus on 12 February 2008. The remaining three fugitives from TWA Flight 847 remain on the list, and at large.

On 12 September 2006, a Bush administration official indicated that Hamadei had rejoined Hezbollah upon his release from the German prison.

On 12 February 2007, the FBI announced a new $5 million reward for information leading to the recapture of Hamadei.

== Death ==
According to Deutsche Presse-Agentur, unconfirmed Pakistani intelligence sources reported that Hamadei was killed in a CIA drone strike inside Pakistan in June 2010. However, Hamadei's death was never confirmed, and he remained on the FBI's Most Wanted Terrorists list and the State Department's Rewards for Justice list.

=== Assassination ===
On 21 January 2025, Hamadei was shot six times outside his home in Machghara, Beqaa Valley by unknown gunmen in two vehicles, and later died at the hospital. The gunmen then fled the scene. The motive of the assassination was unknown and under investigation by Lebanese authorities, but the Lebanese newspaper An-Nahar reported that the assassination was the result of a family feud. Despite the assassination, the FBI's website still lists Hamadei as a fugitive.
