= Lawrence Steven Meyers =

American actor and film producer (1956–2023)

- Born: April 7, 1956; Mount Vernon, New York, U.S.
- Died: November 28, 2023 (aged 67)
- Occupations: Actor; film producer

Lawrence Steven Meyers (April 7, 1956 – November 28, 2023) was an American actor and film producer known for his roles in Dick Tracy (1990) and Battle Beyond the Stars (1980). He was the producer of Unfaithful (2002). He was the founder of Meyers Media Group. Meyers died on December 5, 2023, at the age of 67.
