= Susanne Osthoff =

German archaeologist (born 1962)

- Born: 7 March 1962 (age 64); Grafing, Bavaria, West Germany
- Occupation: Archaeologist
- Known for: Being kidnapped in Iraq in 2005

Susanne Kristina Osthoff (born 7 March 1962) is a German archaeologist who had worked in Iraq from 1991 until being taken hostage there on 25 November 2005. She was freed by her captors on 18 December 2005.

== Biography ==
Osthoff grew up in Grafing in Bavaria with two brothers and one sister. She studied Near Eastern archaeology and Semitic languages at LMU Munich.

After her studies, she moved to Iraq to work in archaeology, including the excavation of the 4,000 year-old Islin site. She subsequently married an Iraqi Sunni Muslim of the Shammar Tribe and converted to Islam.

== Abduction ==
On 25 November, Osthoff and her driver vanished in Northern Iraq. Two days later, a video clip was released showing the two captives surrounded by masked, armed men who read a statement threatening to kill the hostages unless the German government stopped cooperation with the Iraqi government.

Osthoff and her driver were freed from their captors on 18 December 2005.

A spokesperson for the German Foreign Ministry, Martin Jäger, confirmed that "the German government and the German embassy in Baghdad were involved" in securing Osthoff's release. However, German government officials declined to comment on whether they paid a ransom for her release.

In her first interview after release, Osthoff appeared in a full niqab and told Al Jazeera that the kidnappers had assured her she was safe and that they knew she was "Iraq's friend." She expressed her further comfort that she "knew [she] was not in the hands of criminals."

While Osthoff was showering at the German embassy in Baghdad immediately after her release, officers from the Federal Intelligence Service found several thousand dollars in her possession. The serial numbers on the bills matched those on the money paid to secure her release. She claimed that the money had been given to her by her kidnappers as "compensation" for her ordeal and restitution for £9,500 that was stolen from her when she was kidnapped.

Some believe that Germany traded the terrorist Mohammed Ali Hamadi, who was convicted of the murder of US Navy sailor Robert Stethem during the hijacking of TWA Flight 847, for Osthoff's release. The German government has denied that her release was linked to Hamadi's.

== See also ==
- List of kidnappings
- List of solved missing person cases (2000s)
