= Christian Zimmermann =

German-born Palestinian dressage rider

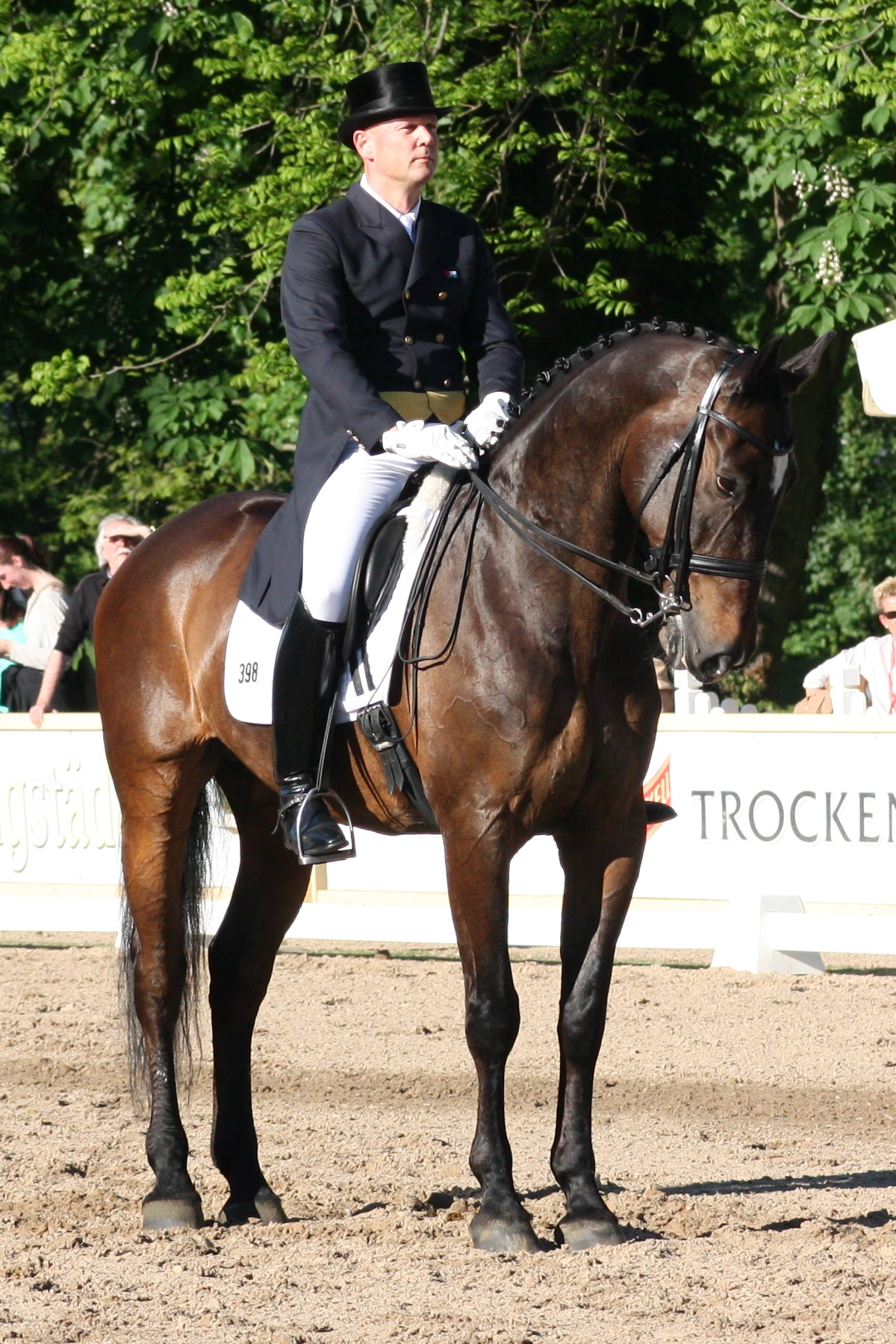
- Christian Zimmermann and Cinco de Mayo (2013)

Personal information
- Born: 12 December 1961 (age 64) Cologne, Germany

Sport
- Country: Palestine
- Sport: Equestrian

Christian Zimmermann (né Brühe) (born 12 December 1961 in Cologne, Germany) is a German-born Palestinian Olympic dressage rider. He represented Palestine at the 2014 World Equestrian Games in Normandy where he finished 68th in the individual dressage competition with Cinco de Mayo. By doing so, he became the first Palestinian to compete at the World Equestrian Games.

== Life ==
Zimmermann is a descendant of composer Robert Schumann. Zimmermann competed in dressage until the age of 26, when he left the sport to go into business, becoming CEO of the communications agency Uniplan After an 18-year hiatus from the sport, he began competing again at the age of 44, initially for Germany.

He obtained dual citizenship in 2011, when he became a naturalized citizen of the State of Palestine. He switched his national allegiance from Germany to Palestine in 2013, becoming one of only six Palestinian equestrians registered with the International Federation for Equestrian Sports. He chose to switch to Palestine after meeting a Russian diplomat with Palestinian roots, which made him think about the German role in the history of Israel and Palestine. The switch also improved his chances of qualifying for the Olympic games compared to if he had competed for Germany. Zimmermann competed at the 2016 Olympics with his Dutch Warmblood gelding Aramis, he finished 57th in the Grand Prix qualifier and did not advance to the further rounds.
