= Cascade, Idaho =

- City
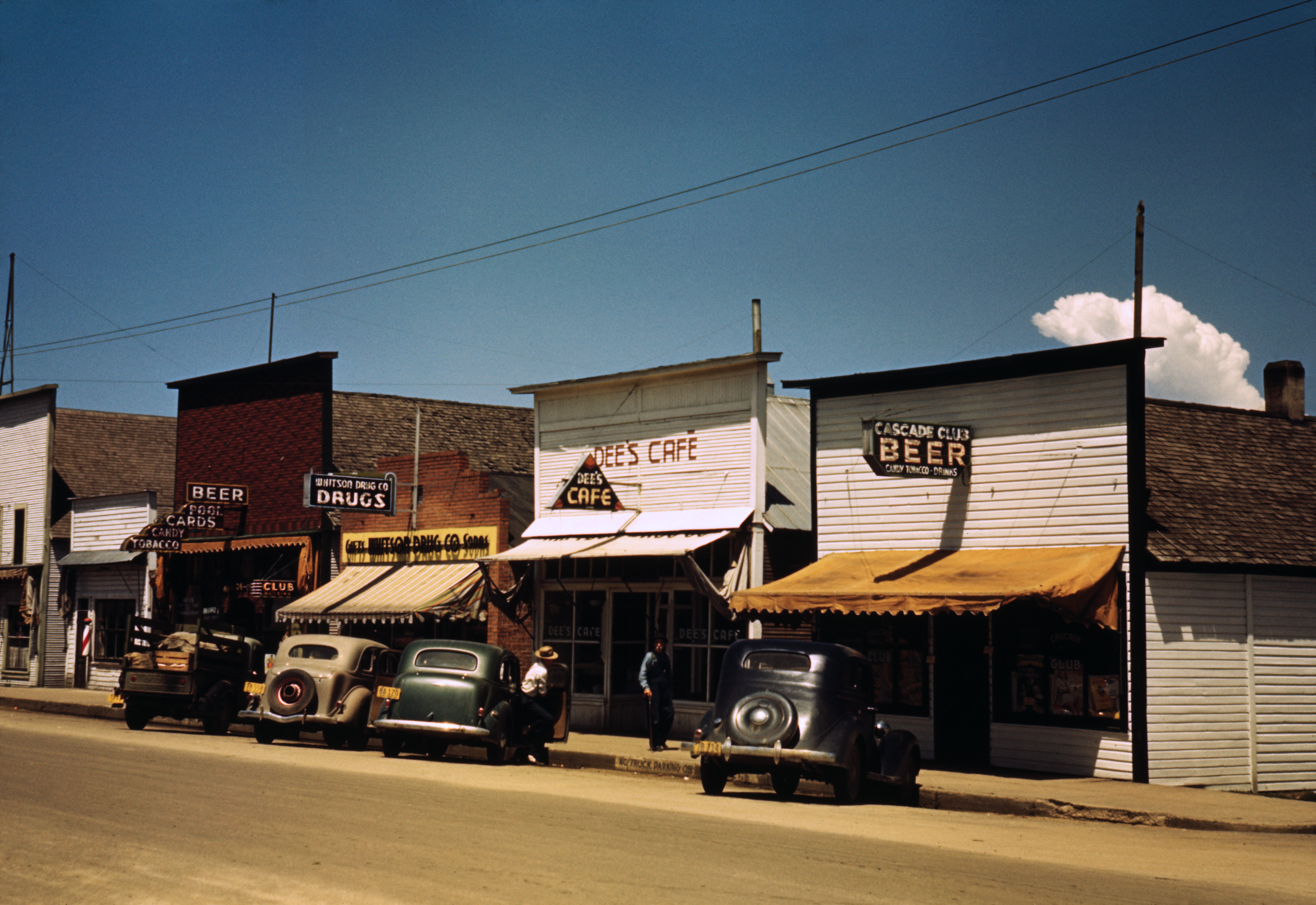
- Cascade in July 1941
- Motto: "Play, Stay, Relax, in the beautiful Cascade area"
- Location of Cascade in Valley County, Idaho.

- Location in the United States
- Coordinates: 44°30′12″N 116°02′31″W
- Country: United States
- State: Idaho
- County: Valley

Area
  - Total: 4.71 sq mi (12.19 km^{2})
  - Land: 4.12 sq mi (10.68 km^{2})
  - Water: 0.58 sq mi (1.51 km^{2})
- Elevation: 4,869 ft (1,484 m)

Population (2020)
  - Total: 1,005
  - Density: 248.6/sq mi (95.97/km^{2})
- Time zone: UTC-7 (Mountain (MST))
  - Summer (DST): UTC-6 (MDT)
- ZIP code: 83611
- Area codes: 208, 986
- FIPS code: 16-13150
- GNIS feature ID: 2409402
- Website: cascadeid.us

Cascade is a rural city in and the county seat of Valley County, Idaho, United States. The population was 1,005 at the 2020 census.

== History ==
The Cascade Dam across the Payette River was completed in 1948, and is located in the north end of the city. The dam created Cascade Reservoir along the west side of the city. With the introduction of nearby Tamarack Resort in 2004, the name was officially changed to Lake Cascade for marketing reasons.

Cascade was the home of a sizable Boise Cascade sawmill, which closed in May 2001.

== Geography ==
According to the United States Census Bureau, the city has a total area of 4.86 square miles (12.59 km^{2}), of which, 4.17 square miles (10.80 km^{2}) is land and 0.69 square miles (1.79 km^{2}) is water.

=== Minor earthquake ===
A minor earthquake here in 1977 measured 4.5 on the Richter scale and lasted over a minute; felt across the region, it was centered near Cascade and occurred in the early hours of Sunday, November 27.

=== Climate ===
Cascade experiences a humid continental climate (Köppen abbreviation Dsb) with long, cold, snowy winters and short, warm, dry summers.

Climate data for Cascade, Idaho, 1991–2020 normals, extremes 1942–2017
Month	Jan	Feb	Mar	Apr	May	Jun	Jul	Aug	Sep	Oct	Nov	Dec	Year
Record high °F (°C)	50 (10)	58 (14)	70 (21)	83 (28)	88 (31)	98 (37)	103 (39)	100 (38)	95 (35)	89 (32)	67 (19)	53 (12)	103 (39)
Mean maximum °F (°C)	43.7 (6.5)	47.7 (8.7)	57.9 (14.4)	70.9 (21.6)	79.8 (26.6)	86.1 (30.1)	92.9 (33.8)	91.6 (33.1)	85.4 (29.7)	74.7 (23.7)	56.3 (13.5)	43.7 (6.5)	93.8 (34.3)
Mean daily maximum °F (°C)	31.6 (−0.2)	37.1 (2.8)	44.9 (7.2)	52.9 (11.6)	62.8 (17.1)	70.3 (21.3)	82.2 (27.9)	81.9 (27.7)	72.5 (22.5)	57.9 (14.4)	41.7 (5.4)	31.5 (−0.3)	55.6 (13.1)
Daily mean °F (°C)	23.2 (−4.9)	27.2 (−2.7)	34.3 (1.3)	41.2 (5.1)	50.0 (10.0)	56.7 (13.7)	65.2 (18.4)	64.4 (18.0)	56.0 (13.3)	44.6 (7.0)	33.1 (0.6)	23.8 (−4.6)	43.3 (6.3)
Mean daily minimum °F (°C)	14.8 (−9.6)	17.4 (−8.1)	23.7 (−4.6)	29.6 (−1.3)	37.2 (2.9)	43.0 (6.1)	48.3 (9.1)	46.8 (8.2)	39.6 (4.2)	31.3 (−0.4)	24.5 (−4.2)	16.1 (−8.8)	31.0 (−0.5)
Mean minimum °F (°C)	−12.0 (−24.4)	−8.9 (−22.7)	2.2 (−16.6)	14.3 (−9.8)	22.0 (−5.6)	27.6 (−2.4)	34.7 (1.5)	33.2 (0.7)	23.2 (−4.9)	15.0 (−9.4)	2.8 (−16.2)	−10.2 (−23.4)	−17.7 (−27.6)
Record low °F (°C)	−40 (−40)	−33 (−36)	−25 (−32)	2 (−17)	12 (−11)	21 (−6)	27 (−3)	24 (−4)	14 (−10)	1 (−17)	−21 (−29)	−36 (−38)	−40 (−40)
Average precipitation inches (mm)	2.96 (75)	2.45 (62)	2.63 (67)	2.05 (52)	2.13 (54)	1.77 (45)	0.50 (13)	0.44 (11)	0.99 (25)	1.71 (43)	2.61 (66)	3.51 (89)	23.75 (602)
Average snowfall inches (cm)	21.8 (55)	14.1 (36)	9.2 (23)	3.3 (8.4)	0.4 (1.0)	0.1 (0.25)	0.0 (0.0)	0.0 (0.0)	0.0 (0.0)	0.9 (2.3)	10.1 (26)	26.4 (67)	86.3 (218.95)
Average extreme snow depth inches (cm)	21.7 (55)	22.2 (56)	17.9 (45)	4.9 (12)	0.2 (0.51)	0.0 (0.0)	0.0 (0.0)	0.0 (0.0)	0.1 (0.25)	0.6 (1.5)	6.8 (17)	15.9 (40)	25.3 (64)
Average precipitation days (≥ 0.01 in)	14.8	12.0	14.3	13.4	12.5	10.5	4.4	4.3	5.5	9.6	14.4	15.8	131.5
Average snowy days (≥ 0.1 in)	10.1	7.4	6.5	2.4	0.4	0.1	0.0	0.0	0.0	0.8	6.1	10.7	44.5
Source 1: NOAA
Source 2: National Weather Service (mean maxima/minima, snow depth 1981–2010)

Climate data for Middle Fork Lodge, Idaho, 1991–2020 normals, extremes 1971–2013
Month	Jan	Feb	Mar	Apr	May	Jun	Jul	Aug	Sep	Oct	Nov	Dec	Year
Record high °F (°C)	55 (13)	64 (18)	76 (24)	87 (31)	95 (35)	100 (38)	103 (39)	104 (40)	98 (37)	92 (33)	68 (20)	59 (15)	104 (40)
Mean maximum °F (°C)	48.3 (9.1)	54.1 (12.3)	66.1 (18.9)	76.9 (24.9)	84.8 (29.3)	91.6 (33.1)	98.0 (36.7)	96.7 (35.9)	90.5 (32.5)	78.9 (26.1)	59.7 (15.4)	47.7 (8.7)	99.0 (37.2)
Mean daily maximum °F (°C)	34.1 (1.2)	40.4 (4.7)	49.8 (9.9)	57.3 (14.1)	66.6 (19.2)	75.0 (23.9)	85.7 (29.8)	85.0 (29.4)	75.9 (24.4)	60.7 (15.9)	43.0 (6.1)	33.3 (0.7)	58.9 (14.9)
Daily mean °F (°C)	25.0 (−3.9)	29.2 (−1.6)	37.4 (3.0)	44.0 (6.7)	52.4 (11.3)	59.5 (15.3)	67.1 (19.5)	65.6 (18.7)	57.5 (14.2)	45.8 (7.7)	33.1 (0.6)	24.2 (−4.3)	45.1 (7.3)
Mean daily minimum °F (°C)	15.9 (−8.9)	17.9 (−7.8)	25.0 (−3.9)	30.8 (−0.7)	38.1 (3.4)	43.9 (6.6)	48.4 (9.1)	46.3 (7.9)	39.1 (3.9)	30.8 (−0.7)	23.1 (−4.9)	15.2 (−9.3)	31.2 (−0.4)
Mean minimum °F (°C)	−4.5 (−20.3)	−0.6 (−18.1)	10.6 (−11.9)	19.5 (−6.9)	25.0 (−3.9)	32.1 (0.1)	37.1 (2.8)	35.6 (2.0)	26.5 (−3.1)	18.7 (−7.4)	5.6 (−14.7)	−3.0 (−19.4)	−10.8 (−23.8)
Record low °F (°C)	−23 (−31)	−20 (−29)	−3 (−19)	10 (−12)	20 (−7)	22 (−6)	27 (−3)	28 (−2)	18 (−8)	4 (−16)	−15 (−26)	−28 (−33)	−28 (−33)
Average precipitation inches (mm)	1.44 (37)	1.24 (31)	1.22 (31)	1.45 (37)	1.75 (44)	1.64 (42)	0.76 (19)	0.68 (17)	1.02 (26)	1.27 (32)	1.59 (40)	1.79 (45)	15.85 (401)
Average snowfall inches (cm)	11.9 (30)	6.4 (16)	3.3 (8.4)	1.1 (2.8)	0.2 (0.51)	0.0 (0.0)	0.0 (0.0)	0.0 (0.0)	0.0 (0.0)	1.0 (2.5)	4.3 (11)	12.5 (32)	40.7 (103.21)
Average precipitation days (≥ 0.01 in)	10.7	8.0	9.6	11.2	10.9	11.5	5.9	4.7	5.7	8.3	10.6	11.0	108.1
Average snowy days (≥ 0.1 in)	7.0	4.3	3.1	1.4	0.3	0.0	0.0	0.0	0.0	0.5	3.5	7.1	27.2
Source 1: NOAA
Source 2: National Weather Service (mean maxima/minima 1981–2010)

Climate data for Taylor Ranch, Idaho, 1991–2020 normals, extremes 1974–2015
Month	Jan	Feb	Mar	Apr	May	Jun	Jul	Aug	Sep	Oct	Nov	Dec	Year
Record high °F (°C)	56 (13)	63 (17)	78 (26)	86 (30)	96 (36)	98 (37)	107 (42)	102 (39)	97 (36)	86 (30)	67 (19)	55 (13)	107 (42)
Mean maximum °F (°C)	43.0 (6.1)	50.7 (10.4)	64.6 (18.1)	78.0 (25.6)	86.3 (30.2)	93.3 (34.1)	99.0 (37.2)	96.8 (36.0)	90.6 (32.6)	75.8 (24.3)	56.1 (13.4)	44.1 (6.7)	99.5 (37.5)
Mean daily maximum °F (°C)	30.9 (−0.6)	38.4 (3.6)	49.8 (9.9)	58.7 (14.8)	68.1 (20.1)	76.4 (24.7)	88.3 (31.3)	87.2 (30.7)	75.9 (24.4)	58.0 (14.4)	40.6 (4.8)	30.2 (−1.0)	58.5 (14.8)
Daily mean °F (°C)	23.6 (−4.7)	28.9 (−1.7)	38.2 (3.4)	45.8 (7.7)	53.9 (12.2)	60.9 (16.1)	69.7 (20.9)	68.4 (20.2)	58.7 (14.8)	45.5 (7.5)	32.7 (0.4)	23.5 (−4.7)	45.8 (7.7)
Mean daily minimum °F (°C)	16.4 (−8.7)	19.4 (−7.0)	26.6 (−3.0)	32.8 (0.4)	39.6 (4.2)	45.4 (7.4)	51.0 (10.6)	49.6 (9.8)	41.5 (5.3)	33.0 (0.6)	24.8 (−4.0)	16.7 (−8.5)	33.1 (0.6)
Mean minimum °F (°C)	−1.0 (−18.3)	2.5 (−16.4)	13.0 (−10.6)	23.1 (−4.9)	28.4 (−2.0)	34.0 (1.1)	41.9 (5.5)	40.4 (4.7)	30.9 (−0.6)	21.7 (−5.7)	10.3 (−12.1)	0.5 (−17.5)	−7.1 (−21.7)
Record low °F (°C)	−11 (−24)	−21 (−29)	−2 (−19)	16 (−9)	24 (−4)	28 (−2)	32 (0)	30 (−1)	23 (−5)	12 (−11)	−4 (−20)	−21 (−29)	−21 (−29)
Average precipitation inches (mm)	1.21 (31)	0.87 (22)	1.07 (27)	1.49 (38)	1.84 (47)	1.73 (44)	0.99 (25)	0.69 (18)	1.10 (28)	1.36 (35)	1.44 (37)	1.09 (28)	14.88 (380)
Average snowfall inches (cm)	9.4 (24)	5.3 (13)	3.0 (7.6)	0.3 (0.76)	0.2 (0.51)	0.0 (0.0)	0.0 (0.0)	0.0 (0.0)	0.0 (0.0)	0.2 (0.51)	4.7 (12)	8.1 (21)	31.2 (79.38)
Average precipitation days (≥ 0.01 in)	10.3	7.0	9.7	11.9	13.0	11.4	6.6	6.3	5.3	8.3	10.6	10.6	111.0
Average snowy days (≥ 0.1 in)	7.4	4.4	3.6	0.4	0.1	0.0	0.0	0.0	0.0	0.3	4.1	7.3	27.6
Source 1: NOAA
Source 2: National Weather Service (mean maxima/minima 1981–2010)

== Demographics ==
Historical population
Census	Pop.	Note	%±
1920	299		—
1930	726		142.8%
1940	1,029		41.7%
1950	943		−8.4%
1960	923		−2.1%
1970	833		−9.8%
1980	945		13.4%
1990	877		−7.2%
2000	997		13.7%
2010	939		−5.8%
2020	1,005		7.0%
U.S. Decennial Census

=== 2020 census ===
As of the 2020 census, Cascade had a population of 1,005. The median age was 53.8 years. 14.5% of residents were under the age of 18 and 31.3% of residents were 65 years of age or older. For every 100 females there were 111.6 males, and for every 100 females age 18 and over there were 118.6 males age 18 and over.

0.0% of residents lived in urban areas, while 100.0% lived in rural areas.

There were 466 households in Cascade, of which 18.5% had children under the age of 18 living in them. Of all households, 47.6% were married-couple households, 24.7% were households with a male householder and no spouse or partner present, and 23.2% were households with a female householder and no spouse or partner present. About 38.9% of all households were made up of individuals and 18.9% had someone living alone who was 65 years of age or older.

There were 829 housing units, of which 43.8% were vacant. The homeowner vacancy rate was 2.3% and the rental vacancy rate was 6.5%.

Racial composition as of the 2020 census
Race	Number	Percent
White	888	88.4%
Black or African American	0	0.0%
American Indian and Alaska Native	7	0.7%
Asian	1	0.1%
Native Hawaiian and Other Pacific Islander	1	0.1%
Some other race	33	3.3%
Two or more races	75	7.5%
Hispanic or Latino (of any race)	56	5.6%

=== 2010 census ===
As of the census of 2010, there were 939 people, 416 households, and 256 families residing in the city. The population density was 225.2 inhabitants per square mile (87.0/km^{2}). There were 847 housing units at an average density of 203.1 per square mile (78.4/km^{2}). The racial makeup of the city was 96.5% White, 0.2% African American, 0.9% Native American, 0.2% Asian, 0.6% from other races, and 1.6% from two or more races. Hispanic or Latino of any race were 2.7% of the population.

There were 416 households, of which 24.5% had children under the age of 18 living with them, 48.6% were married couples living together, 9.6% had a female householder with no husband present, 3.4% had a male householder with no wife present, and 38.5% were non-families. 32.0% of all households were made up of individuals, and 12.5% had someone living alone who was 65 years of age or older. The average household size was 2.20 and the average family size was 2.77.

The median age in the city was 46.4 years. 19.6% of residents were under the age of 18; 8.7% were between the ages of 18 and 24; 19.9% were from 25 to 44; 33.9% were from 45 to 64; and 18% were 65 years of age or older. The gender makeup of the city was 50.7% male and 49.3% female.

=== 2000 census ===
As of the census of 2000, there were 997 people, 421 households, and 282 families residing in the city. The population density was 275.8 inhabitants per square mile (106.5/km^{2}). There were 562 housing units at an average density of 155.5 per square mile (60.0/km^{2}). The racial makeup of the city was 95.59% White, 0.10% African American, 0.40% Native American, 0.30% Asian, 0.10% Pacific Islander, 1.60% from other races, and 1.91% from two or more races. Hispanic or Latino of any race were 2.21% of the population. 22.6% were of German, 12.7% English, 11.4% Irish, 8.7% American and 5.8% French ancestry according to Census 2000.

There were 421 households, out of which 30.4% had children under the age of 18 living with them, 51.1% were married couples living together, 10.2% had a female householder with no husband present, and 33.0% were non-families. 29.2% of all households were made up of individuals, and 10.5% had someone living alone who was 65 years of age or older. The average household size was 2.32 and the average family size was 2.83.

In the city, the population was spread out, with 27.0% under the age of 18, 4.3% from 18 to 24, 25.3% from 25 to 44, 26.5% from 45 to 64, and 17.0% who were 65 years of age or older. The median age was 40 years. For every 100 females, there were 102.2 males. For every 100 females age 18 and over, there were 99.5 males.

The median income for a household in the city was $32,411, and the median income for a family was $37,813. Males had a median income of $36,250 versus $20,139 for females. The per capita income for the city was $17,330. About 9.3% of families and 12.1% of the population were below the poverty line, including 20.1% of those under age 18 and 9.0% of those age 65 or over.

== Infrastructure ==
State Highway 55 passes through Cascade.

== Notable people ==
- Chris Crutcher, novelist and family therapist
- Norman L. Foote, bishop of the Episcopal Diocese of Idaho from 1957 to 1972
- Terry Gestrin, member of the Idaho House of Representatives
- Rod Miller, MLB player
- Ken Roberts, former member of the Idaho House of Representatives
