= Ali Atwa =

Lebanese terrorist (1965–2021)

- علي عطوة
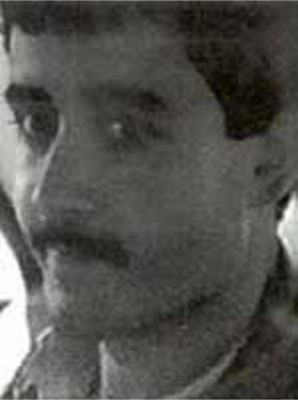
- Born: c. 1965; Lebanon
- Died: c. 9 October 2021 (aged 55–56); Lebanon
- Other names: Ammar Mansour Bouslim; Hassan Rostom Salim

Ali Atwa (Arabic: علي عطوة; c. 1965 – c. 9 October 2021) was a Lebanese national and member of the Islamist organization Hezbollah. Atwa was also known as Ammar Mansour Bouslim and Hassan Rostom Salim.

Atwa was wanted by the United States government for his alleged involvement in the 14 June 1985 hijacking of TWA Flight 847. Atwa allegedly intended to help hijack the plane but was bumped from the flight, was arrested but was then released by the Greek government as part of the deal to release the hostages, and then rejoined the hijackers in Algiers on board the hijacked airplane. This hijacking resulted in the death of United States Navy diver Robert Stethem.

On 1 October 2001, Atwa along with two other alleged participants in the hijacking was placed on the initial list of the U.S. Federal Bureau of Investigation's top 22 Most Wanted Terrorists, which was released to the public by President Bush. A reward of US$5 million was being offered for information leading to his arrest and conviction. Atwa died of cancer in October 2021 in Lebanon. Despite this, the FBI's website still lists Atwa as a fugitive.

== See also ==
- Imad Mughniyah
- Hassan Izz-Al-Din
