= Hassan Izz-Al-Din =

Lebanese terrorist (born c. 1963)

- حسن عز الدين
- Born: Hassan Izz-Al-Din c. 1963; Lebanon
- Other names: Ahmed Garbaya, Samir Salwwan, Sa-id, Nikolay Kalpakov
- Known for: One of the FBI's Most Wanted Terrorists
- Height: 5 ft 9 in (175 cm)–5 ft 11 in
- Allegiance: Lebanese Hizbollah (alleged)
- Motive: Islamism
- Reward amount: US$5,000,000
- Capture status: Fugitive
- Wanted by: United States
- Wanted since: 1985

Details
- Country: Lebanon

Hasan Izz-Al-Din (Arabic: حسن عز الدين, romanized: Ḥassan ‘Iz ad-Dīn; born c. 1963) is a Lebanese terrorist wanted by the United States government.

Hasan Izz-Al-Din is an alleged member of Hezbollah. He is currently wanted by the United States government for his alleged involvement in the June 14, 1985 hijacking of TWA Flight 847. This attack resulted in the death of United States Navy diver Robert Stethem. On October 10, 2001, Izz-Al-Din, along with two other alleged participants in the hijacking, was placed on the initial list of the FBI's top 22 Most Wanted Terrorists, which was released to the public by President George W. Bush. A reward of $5 million is currently being offered for information leading to his arrest and conviction. It is believed he is residing in Lebanon.

== See also ==
- Ali Atwa
- Imad Mugniyah
- List of fugitives from justice who disappeared
