= Robert Stethem =

US Navy sailor and Hezbollah murder victim (1961–1985)

Robert Dean Stethem
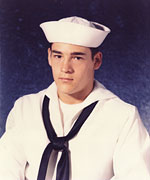
- Born: November 17, 1961; Waterbury, Connecticut, U.S.
- Died: June 15, 1985 (aged 23); Beirut, Lebanon
- Burial place: Arlington National Cemetery; 38.8780°N 77.0658°W
- Military career
- Allegiance: United States
- Branch: United States Navy
- Service years: 1981–85
- Rank: Petty Officer Second Class steelworker constructionman (SW2); Second-class diver (DV); posthumously promoted to Master Chief Constructionman (CUCM)
- Units: Underwater Construction; Team ONE (UCT-ONE)
- Awards: Bronze Star; Purple Heart

Robert Dean Stethem (November 17, 1961 – June 15, 1985) was a United States Navy Seabee diver who was murdered by Hezbollah members during the hijacking of the commercial airliner he was aboard, TWA Flight 847. At the time of his death, his Navy rating was Steelworker Second Class (SW2). He was posthumously promoted to Master Chief Constructionman (CUCM).

== Early life ==
Stethem was born in Waterbury, Connecticut, but grew up in Virginia Beach, Virginia, and Waldorf, Maryland. He was one of four children. His father, Richard Stethem, retired from the Navy as a Senior Chief after 20 years, continuing to work for it as a civilian afterwards. His mother Patricia served with the Navy before raising her family, continuing to serve in the U.S. Court of Appeals for the Armed Forces afterwards. His brother, Chief Boatswain's Mate Kenneth Stethem, was a Navy SEAL and brother Diver First Class Patrick Stethem served in Underwater Construction Team One for 10 years – the same unit in which Robert served. Stethem had one sister, Sheryl Sierralta.

He graduated from Thomas Stone High School in 1980, where he played defensive back on the varsity and junior varsity football teams. He also played Little League baseball.

Stethem joined the Navy soon after graduating, reporting for duty on May 4, 1981.

== Navy career ==
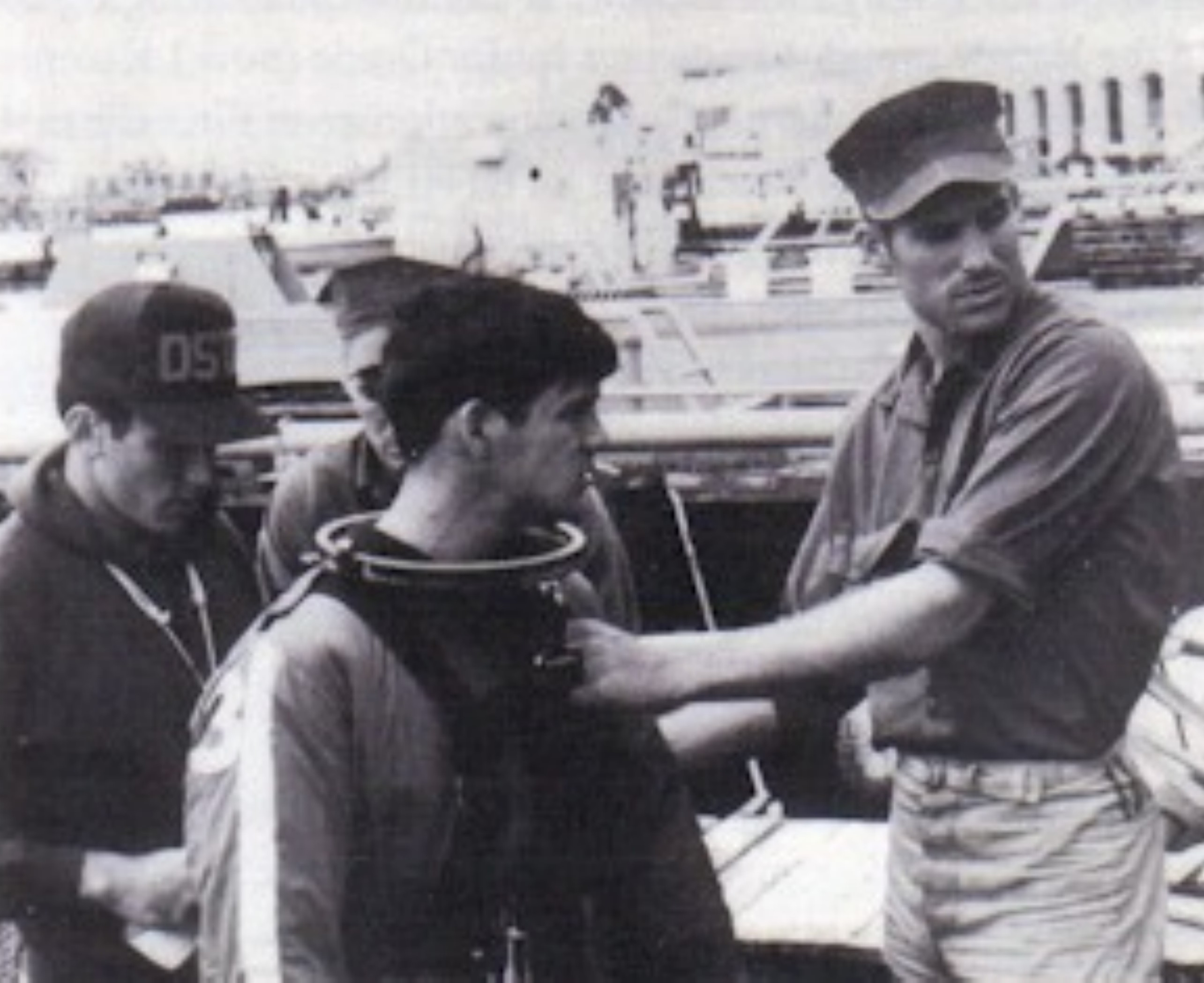
SW2 Robert Stethem preparing for a dive while part of Underwater Construction Team ONE (UCT-ONE)

In the Navy, Stethem was a Seabee Steelworker assigned to Naval Mobile Construction Battalion 62 in Gulfport, Mississippi. He served multiple tours on Diego Garcia and Guam. Later, Stethem became a 2nd Class Navy Diver and was assigned to the Navy's Underwater Construction Team One in Little Creek, Virginia.

== TWA Flight 847 ==
On June 14, 1985, Stethem was returning from an assignment in Nea Makri, Greece, aboard TWA Flight 847 when it was hijacked by members of the Lebanese organization Hezbollah. The hijackers kept 39 people hostage for 17 days, demanding the release of 766 Lebanese and Palestinians held by Israel. When their demands were not met, Stethem, as a member of the U.S. military, was beaten and tortured. Finally, the terrorists shot him in the temple and dumped his body onto the tarmac at the Beirut airport.

One of the hijackers, Mohammed Ali Hammadi, was arrested two years later in Frankfurt, Germany. He was tried and convicted of Stethem's murder and sentenced to life in prison but was released in 2005 after serving 19 years. Three others, Imad Mugniyah, Hassan Izz-Al-Din, and Ali Atwa, were eventually indicted for their involvement in the incident. In 2002, they were added to the FBI Most Wanted Terrorists list. On February 13, 2008, Mugniyah was killed in an explosion in Damascus, Syria. In 2019, Greek police arrested a 65-year-old Lebanese man who was accused of involvement in the hijacking, but he was released after police determined it was a case of mistaken identity.

== Awards and decorations ==
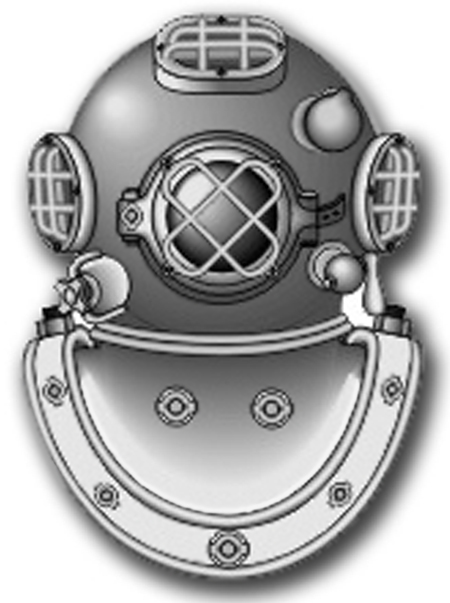

U.S. Navy enlisted diver insignia
Bronze Star Medal		Purple Heart
Prisoner of War Medal	Navy Good Conduct Medal	National Defense Service Medal

Stethem was posthumously awarded the Purple Heart and Bronze Star. His body was collected from the airport tarmac and repatriated to the US; he is buried in Arlington National Cemetery, Section 59, Grave 430, near other American victims of international terrorism.

On August 24, 2010, in Yokosuka, Japan, aboard the ship named after him – the USS Stethem (DDG-63) – Stethem was made an honorary Master Chief Constructionman (CUCM) by order of the Master Chief Petty Officer of the Navy. His brother, Kenneth, accepted the certificate and decorations on behalf of the Stethem family.

On April 24, 2015, Secretary of the Navy Ray Mabus presented the Prisoner of War medal to Stethem's parents.

== Honors ==
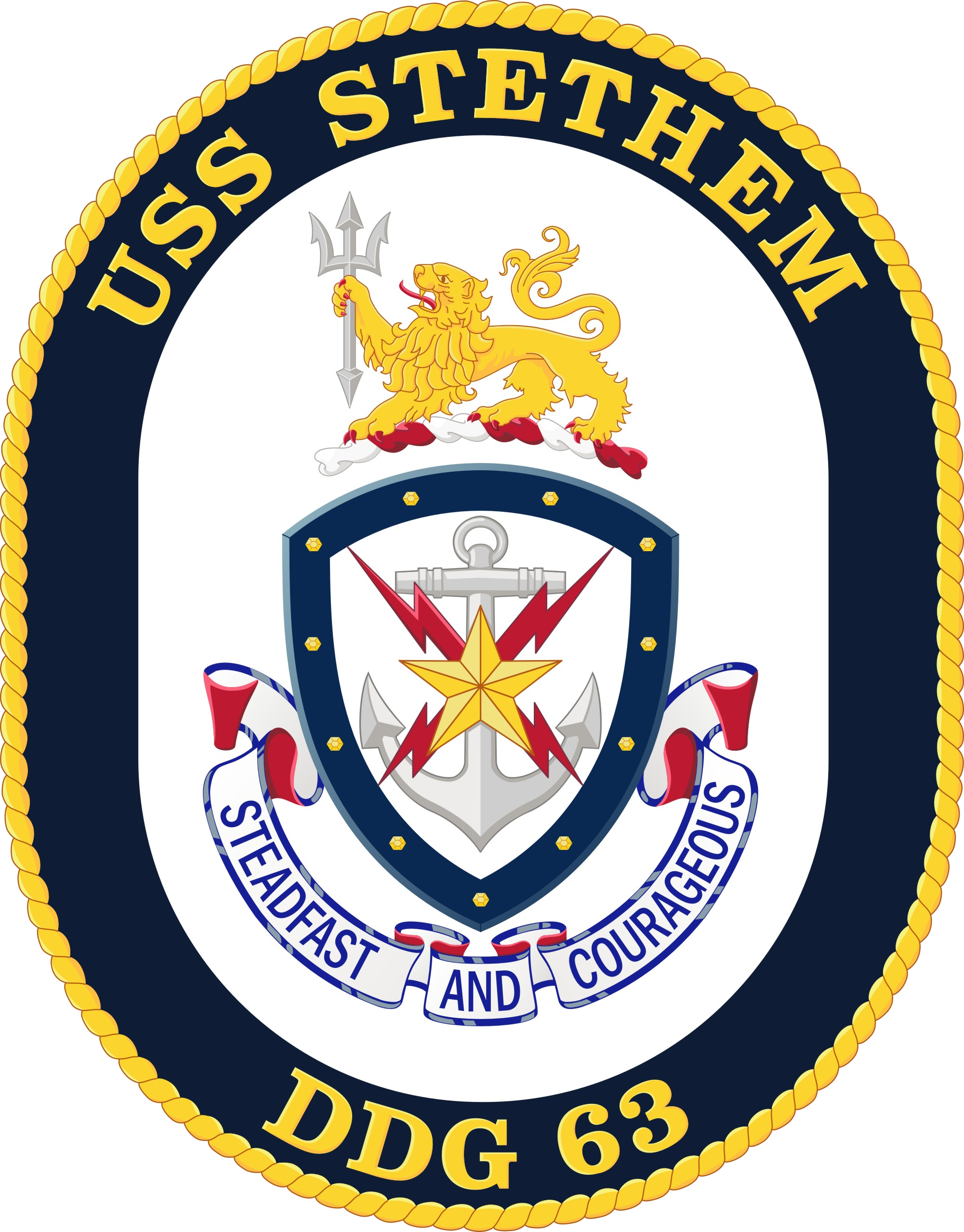
Crest of the USS Stethem (DDG-63).

The following are named after Stethem:

- The Robert D. Stethem Memorial Sports Complex, Waldorf, Maryland
- The Robert D. Stethem Educational Center, a vocational school in Pomfret, Maryland
- Robert D. Stethem Barracks, Training Support Center Hampton Roads, Virginia Beach, Virginia
- Stethem Memorial Navy Lodge, Naval Construction Battalion Center, Gulfport, Mississippi
- Headquarters building and a street on the base, Port Hueneme Naval Construction Training Center, near Oxnard, California
- USS Stethem (DDG-63), an Aegis Arleigh Burke-class destroyer, commissioned 1995

== In popular culture ==
A scene from the movie The Delta Force depicts a U.S. Navy diver being beaten, tortured, and murdered by gunshot, with his body being dumped onto the tarmac, albeit taking place in Algiers instead of Beirut. This scene is based on Stethem.

Stethem was portrayed by Steven Eckholdt in the 1988 television movie The Taking of Flight 847: The Uli Derickson Story.

== See also ==
- USS Stethem (DDG-63)
