= Abdulghaphor Hajjieh =

Kuwaiti economist

- عبدالغفور حاجيه
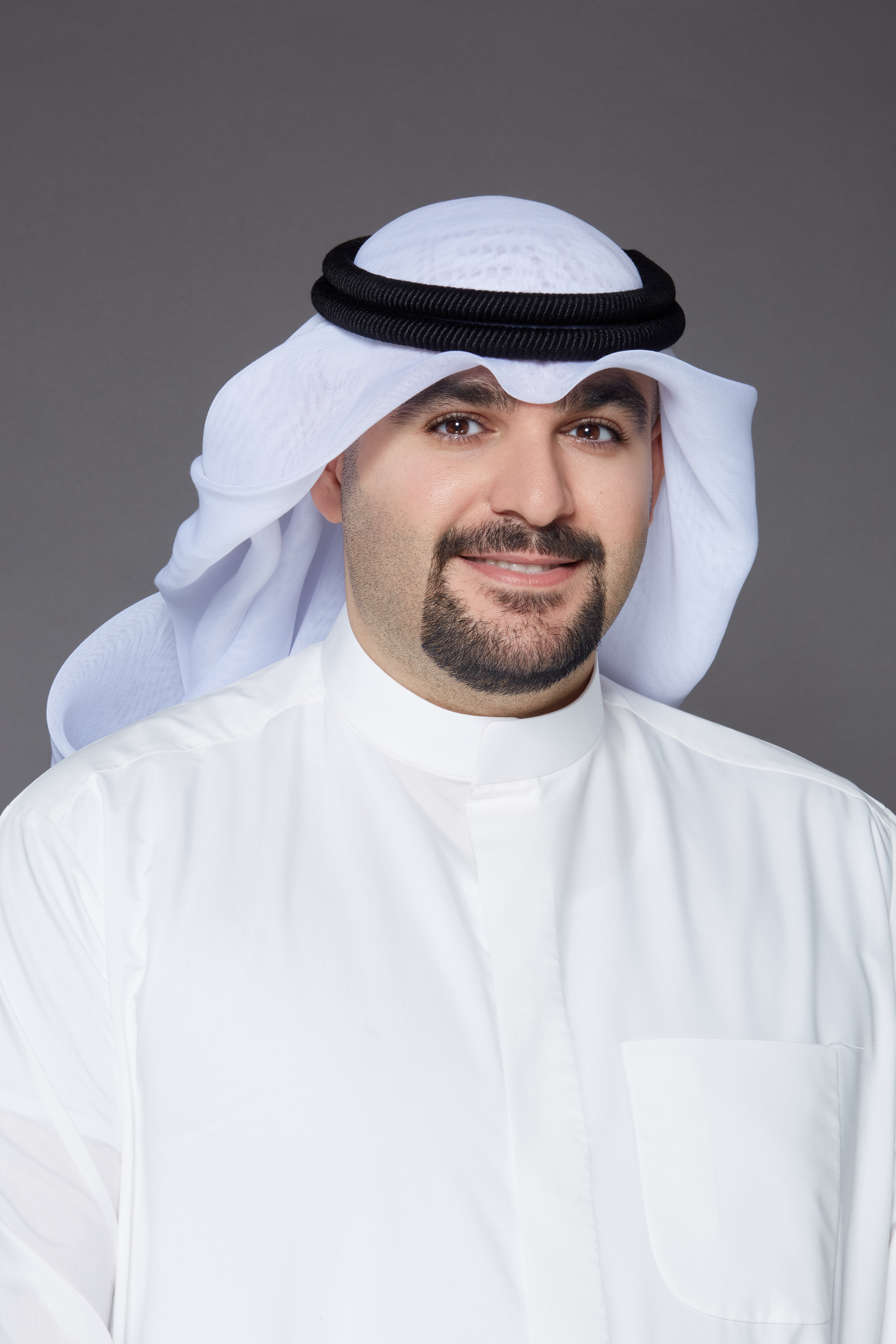
- Born: 15 March 1988 (age 38); Salmiya, Kuwait
- Education: Kuwait University (BSc) University of Kansas (MA)
- Occupations: Economist, Politician
- Political party: Kuwait Democratic Forum (2008–present)

Abdulghaphor Hajjieh (Arabic: عبدالغفور حاجيه, born 15 March 1988) is an economist and politician from Kuwait, who served as a board member for the Democratic Forum and the Youth Association of Kuwait.

Hajjieh attended Khalid Saud Al Zaid High School, a public high school in Qurain, studied economics at Kuwait University and the University of Kansas, and later joined Kuwait Institute for Scientific Research as an economist and Al Anba Newspaper as a business columnist. He previously worked for the International Monetary Fund, Al Safat Investment Company, and Al Qabas Newspaper.

He became involved with the Democratic Forum in 2008 through its affiliate student organization, the Democratic Circle Ticket, and an affiliated youth organization the Youth Association of Kuwait, becoming a Treasurer of the former and Vice President of the latter. He's considered part of the centre-left faction of the Forum, advocating for gradual political and economic reform through elections and joining the Al Sabah Cabinet.

== Early life and education ==
Hajjieh was born on March 15, 1988, in Salmiya, the third child of Mohammed Hajjieh Asirri (Arabic: محمد حاجيه أسيري). He attended Khaled Saud Al Zaid High School (Arabic: ثانوية خالد سعود الزيد), where he majored in science. At High School, he volunteered for the Democratic Circle Ticket which ran for student council.

=== Kuwait University ===
He was accepted to Kuwait University, where he studied Economics. He explains that his acceptance was based on a Public Authority for Applied Education and Training certificate, not his high school diploma, restricting his application to business school, adding that economics was the closest thing to Political Science and that he likes how it draws from other disciplines and the abstract nature of it.

At KU, he joined the Dean's List Council (Arabic: اللجنة الاستشارية للطلبة المتفوقين), a prestigious student organization that represents the interests of honor students, and was later elected as its vice president and eventually its president. As President of that organization, he voted on rewriting its bylaws to include direct student academic assistance through one-on-one tutoring and pushed for rebranding the organization and adopting the acronym DLCCBA.

He also joined the Democratic Circle (Arabic: قائمة الوسط الديمقراطي), a left-leaning student organization that supports a ticket that runs for the board of the National Union for Kuwaiti Students (Arabic: الاتحاد الوطني لطلبة الكويت), and became its treasurer. During his tenure as treasurer, he tapped into a network of former members and organizations such as Kuwait Democratic Forum, National Democratic Alliance, and Youth Association of Kuwait to help fund it.

Furthermore, with a group of colleagues, he started KU's first online, streaming through SoundCloud and later YouTube, named the Voice of CBA (Arabic: إذاعة صوت الإدارية) that had two recurring shows, one commenting on current student affairs and another interviewing student activists about their interests. However, after one month he was instructed to shut it down due to complaints of bias.

During his time at Kuwait University, he was chosen to intern at the United States Department of State and graduated summa cum laude.

=== University of Kansas ===
Through a merit scholarship from Kuwait Institute for Scientific Research, he studied and graduated with a master's degree in economics from the University of Kansas, where he was handpicked by the economics department to lead the Economics Graduate Student Organization, while building a wide-ranging coalition to help him get elected in a landslide to the university's Student Senate on a platform to make the GRE optional across all graduate program applications. During his studies he wrote an essay titled In Defense of Hedonic Pricing in economic philosophy.

He also supports Al Wihda (Arabic: قائمة الوحدة الطلابية), a liberal student organization that runs for the National Union of Kuwaiti Students's USA branch seats, writing in Al Anba newspaper that it is a principled organization that believes in democracy, liberty, equality and justice, furthermore explaining that any Kuwaiti student in the United States that's against sectarianism and tribalism should support it.

=== University of Aberdeen ===
He is currently pursuing a PhD in economics at the University of Aberdeen in the United Kingdom.

== Career ==
=== Economics ===
As a Research Assistant and Course Administrator at the International Monetary Fund, Abdulghaphor worked with in-house economists, gaining extensive knowledge on economic matters and political economy, attributing his time at the IMF to his fondness of macroeconomics. He also explains that he learned diplomatic language and international relations through working alongside various senior IMF officials, and interacting with senior Arab government officials when organizing economic training courses on fiscal policy, monetary policy, the real sector, and other topics.

While at the IMF, Abdulghaphor assisted in organizing a symposium that hosted celebrated American journalist Thomas Friedman and the former Amiri Diwan's Economic Advisor H.E. Yousef Al-Ebraheem, PhD (Arabic: د. يوسف الإبراهيم), and other economic crash courses for newly elected parliamentarians and newly appointed senior officials in the middle east.

Later, he was recruited to join Kuwait Institute for Scientific Research to work on policies, strategies, and applied economic research in Financial Economics and Macroeconomics as part of its Macroeconomic Policy Analysis Program, and where he participated in a project titled The 2020 Corona Virus Outbreak and Global Growth and Trade Collapse and another namely Fiscal Policy for Sustainable Public Finance in Kuwait.

=== Investment ===
In the investment sector, Hajjieh joined Safat Investment Company (Arabic: شركة الصفاة للإستثمار) to work as an Investor Relations Manager, where he facilitated communication between existing, potential investors, and corporate management. He also coordinated the issuance of Safat's Annual Report and organized its annual general assembly. Furthermore, he suggested creating a venture capital fund called SafatVC and a co-working space to become part of its deal pipeline, however the VC fund never materialized while a co-working space called Hex Offices was created.

In addition to being an Investor Relations Manager, he was assigned some Public Relations activities such as directing external messaging to media outlets, managing corporate social responsibility efforts, and a project which yielded a Guinness World Record.

=== Media ===
Abdulghaphor started his career in media during his time at the Public Authority for Applied Education and Training, covering the student movement and local politics for Al Taleea Weekly Newspaper, a left leaning media organization associated with Kuwait Democratic Forum. After graduating for the PAAET and going to Kuwait University, he started working for both Al Taleea and Al Qabas Newspaper.

After graduating from Kuwait University, he started contributing as a columnist for the economic section at Al Qabas Newspaper, and later joing Al Anba Newspaper as a business columnist.

== Community Participation and Activism ==
Abdulghaphor Hajjieh joined multiple liberal and left-leaning organizations in Kuwait in addition to Kuwait Graduate Society and Kuwait Economic Society.

=== Kuwait Democratic Forum ===
Abdulghaphor was recruited by Ali Hussain Al-Awadhi to join the Democratic Forum after representing the Youth Association of Kuwait in multiple events. In 2019, he was elected as a board member for the Forum and was later re-elected to the board and promoted to board secretary in 2020 where he served until 2022.

He was a fixture of the Forum's electoral campaigns, working for Mohammed Al-Abduljader's in 2008, Abdullah Al-Naibari in 2009, Mohammed Al-Abduljader in 2012 and 2013.

=== Youth Association of Kuwait ===
Hajjieh joined the National Democratic Youth Association in 2007, which later became the Youth Association of Kuwait in 2010, an affiliate of the Democratic Forum. He represented the Association at Kuwait Civil Alliance in 2014, and helped issue a Universal Periodic Review document that was discussed at the United Nations Human Rights Council.

Also, in 2014 he spearheaded a campaign that successfully lobbied the Kuwaiti Ministry of Youth Affairs and the Ministry of Social Works to issue a regulatory framework that gives volunteer organizations legal status. In 2015, the Association was granted legal status under Kuwaiti law and he was elected as treasurer of the newly formed legal entity. In 2017 he was elected to Vice President of the Youth Association of Kuwait, however he quit soon after to pursue a political career in the Democratic Forum of Kuwait.

=== National Youth Project ===
Abdulghaphor was requested by a senior government official in 2019 to participate in the Amiri Diwan's National Youth Project as quasi-representative of young leftists, where he participated in discussions that culminated in issuing the Youth Policy Manual. He also participated in the Diwan's Kuwait Nudgeathon competition of which he won.

== Views ==
As an economist, Hajjieh writes generally about topics ranging from technology to public policy in various publications, mainly Al Qabas and Al Anbaa Newspapers.

=== Economics and Technology ===
==== Price Controls and Their Effectiveness ====
In Al Khaleej News, Abdulghaphor says that price controls distort the goods market and will eventually lead to either a surplus if prices were set too high or a deficit if prices were too low, adding that there are alternative policies that are less intrusive such as agricultural investment through Kuwait's sovereign wealth fund in other countries and exporting them back with favorable prices.

==== Cabinet-level Chief Economist Post ====
On Good Morning Kuwait, Abdulghaphor proposed the creation of a cabinet-level Chief Economist post that serves as head of a Council of Economic Advisors, adding that one of main reasons the government needs that post is to steer economic expectations related to inflation, unemployment, and growth, in addition to providing evidence-based policy initiatives.

==== Remarks on Establshing the Ministry of Economic Affairs ====
To draw on domestic economic expertise, he proposed that the newly formed Ministry of State for Economic Affairs engage government departments and Kuwait-funded institutions responsible for economic advice and research. He specifically cited the Techno-Economic Division at Kuwait Institute for Scientific Research, the Economic Research Department at the Central Bank of Kuwait, the IMF’s Center for Economics and Finance, Tri International Consulting Group, and economics departments at local academic institutions. He also criticized the government’s overreliance on management consulting firms.

==== Workforce Nationalization as Wealth Distribution ====
Hajjieh claims that a historical trend of Kuwaitization of administrative and clerical work as means of wealth distribution didn't start with the discovery of oil by Anglo-Persian Oil Company in 1934, but rather later as a reaction to calls for political reform by nationalist and Pan-Arab political groups.

==== Technological Advancement as a Cause of Inequality ====
Abdulghaphor views automation as an inevitable outcome of technological progress, analyzing that the steady rise of unemployment in the middle east is partly caused by the modernization of both the private and public sectors. He adds that governments across the middle east should rethink their education policies to include transferrable skills that can adjust to the increasing deindustrialization of multiple sectors. He professes that the world is going to split not between core states and peripheral states but between countries that invest heavily in science and technology and those that don't.

=== Domestic Politics ===
==== Common Political Framework for Nationalist Political Organizations ====
In an article published in the now-defunct leftist newspaper Al-Taleea, he identified ideological stagnation as a key problem. He argued that the national bloc—comprising the Democratic Forum, the National Democratic Alliance, the Youth Association of Kuwait, and the Democratic Circle Ticket—lacked a shared frame of reference for cooperation. These divisions, he contended, became evident during Kuwait’s opposition protests in 2012, when political organizations faced resignations because they could not defend their positions. He called for a shared ideological framework, or at least agreement on basic principles, to provide common ground for future cooperation among competing nationalist and secularist groups..

==== Reimagining the Gulf Cooperation Council ====
He authored an article advocating to augmenting the Gulf Cooperation Council, extending it beyond its current members, adding the Republic of Iraq, Hashemite Kingdom of Jordan, and Republic of Yemen led by an internationally recognized government, arguing that this effort can stabilize the region through cultural exchange and bilateral trade, adding that the GCC+ as he calls it can increase the opportunities for Kuwait's private sector to establish a foothold in these new markets.
