= Kuwait Economic Society =

Non-Governmental Organisation

- الجمعية الاقتصادية الكويتية
- Formation: January 1, 1970; 56 years ago
- Type: NGO
- Legal status: foundation
- Purpose: Economic-related support and consultation.
- Headquarters: Kuwait City
- Location: Kuwait
- Official language: Arabic
- Website: kesoc.org

Kuwait Economic Society (Arabic: الجمعية الاقتصادية الكويتية) is a non-governmental organization that was established in 1970 in Kuwait. It is managed by an elected board to provide integrated support and consultation to governmental and non-governmental institutions in the fields of economics as well as to participate and organize field-related competitions local events.

== Organizational Structure ==
KESOC is managed by a biennially elected board that sets its organizational strategy and manages its day-to-day operations. Each board member manages a committee that does specific functions.

=== Current Board of Directors ===
- Abdulaziz Abdulla Al Humaidhi (Chairperson)
- Ahmad R. Altuhaih (Deputy Chairperson)
- Mohammad Bader AlJouan (Secretary General)
- Muhammed Meteb Al-Rasheed (Treasurer)
- Hamad Khaled Al-Abdulkarim
- Hamad A. Alqatami
- Abdulmohsen Mohammad Almulaifi
- Ali Faisal AlKazemi
- Muhammad Al- Erian
- Haya Ayman Abdullah Boodai
- Faisal Abdul Rahman Al-Medlej (Honorary President)

=== Prominent Members ===
- Abdullah Al-Nibari, KESOC Founder and Former Member of Parliament
- Abdulwahab Al-Rushaid, Former Minister of Finance
- Faisal Al Medlej, Former Minister of Commerce
- Rola Dashti, PhD, Former Minister of Planning and Development
- Abdullah Al Salman, PhD, Former Minister of Commerce
- Abdulghaphor Hajjieh, Economist and Politician
