= Progressivism =

Political philosophy in support of progress and/or reform

Progressivism is a political philosophy that seeks to make progress in the human condition through reforms aimed at increasing positive liberty. Progressivism arose during the Age of Enlightenment out of the belief that civility in Europe was improving due to the application of new empirical knowledge.

Progressivism as an umbrella term is associated with social democracy as well as reformist variants of conservatism, liberalism, socialism, and communism.

Within economic progressivism, there is some ideological variation. Illustrative examples of this include some Christian democracy and conservative-leaning communitarian movements. While many ideologies can fall under the banner of progressivism, all eras of the movement are characterized by an economic populist critique of unregulated capitalism and a call for a more active democratic government to safeguard human rights, promote cultural development, and serve as a check-and-balance on corporate monopolies.

Other types of progressivism include techno-progressivism.

== Early history ==
=== From the Enlightenment to the Industrial Revolution ===
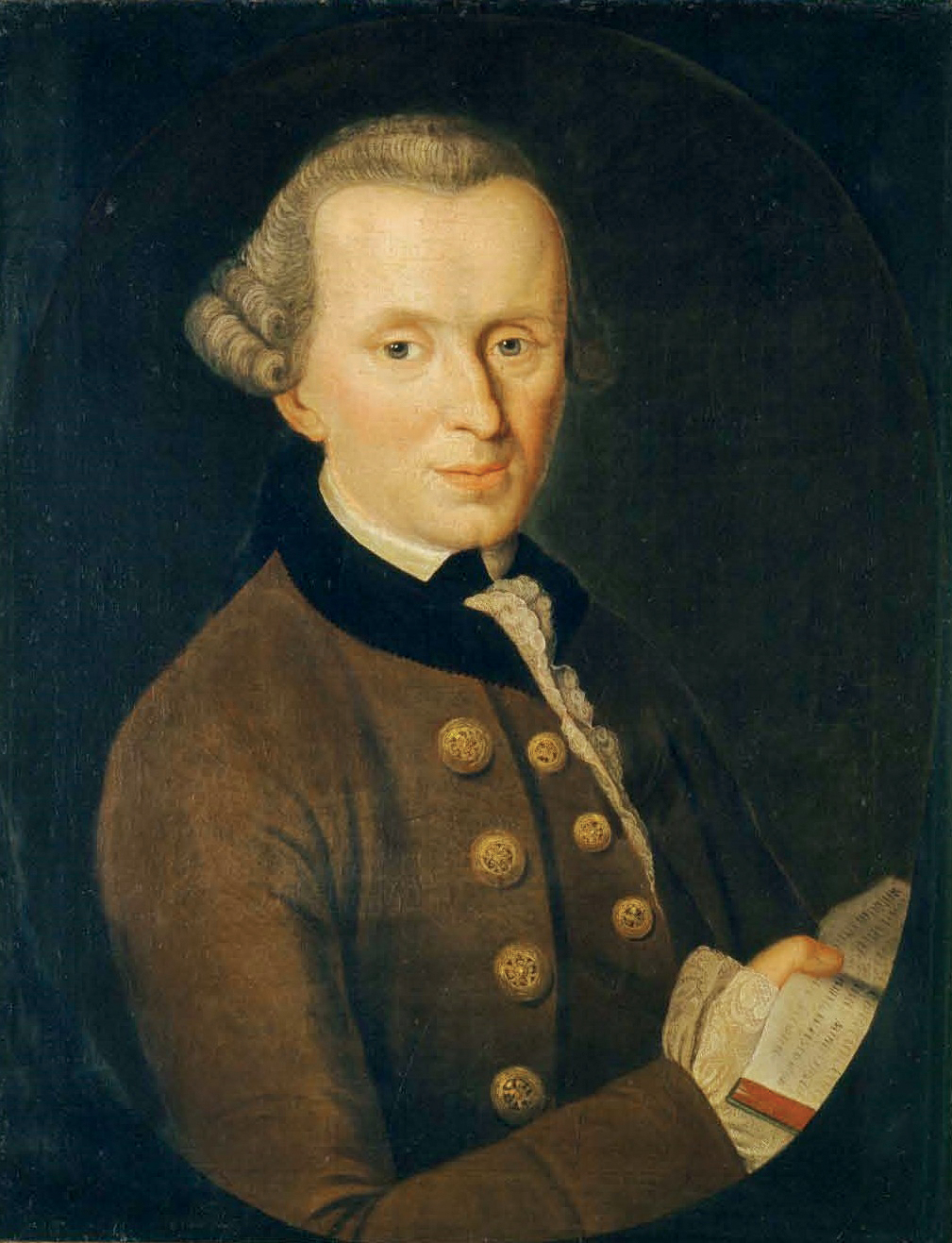
Immanuel Kant, German philosopher

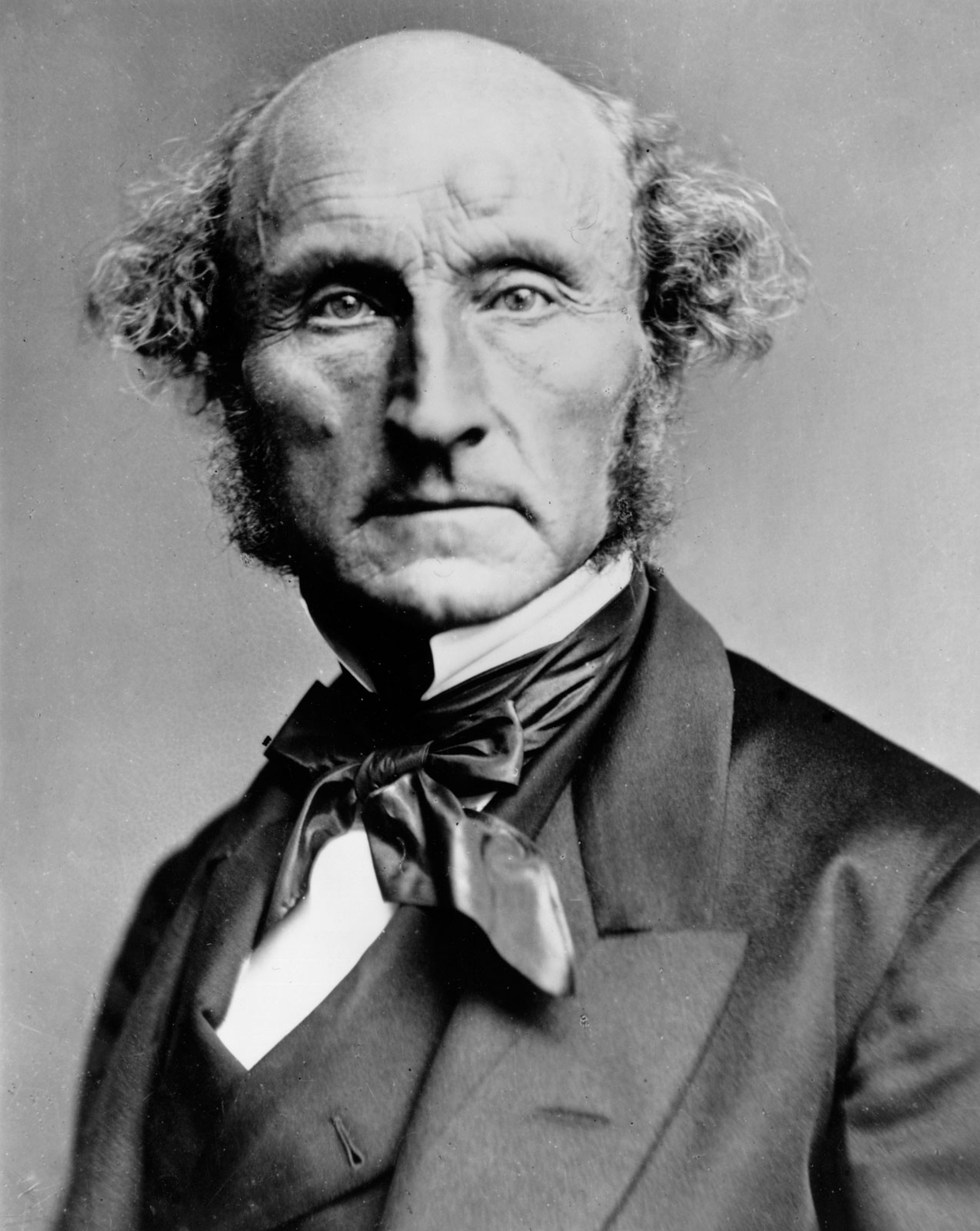
John Stuart Mill, English philosopher

Immanuel Kant identified progress as being a movement away from barbarism toward civilization. 18th-century philosopher and political scientist Marquis de Condorcet predicted that political progress would involve the disappearance of slavery, the rise of literacy, the lessening of sex inequality, reform of prisons, which at the time were harsh, and the decline of poverty.

Modernity or modernisation was a key form of the idea of progress as promoted by classical liberals in the 19th and 20th centuries, who called for the rapid modernisation of the economy and society to remove the traditional hindrances to free markets and the free movements of people.

In the late 19th century, a political view rose in popularity in the Western world that progress was being stifled by vast economic inequality between the rich and the poor, minimally regulated laissez-faire capitalism with out-of-control monopolistic corporations, intense and often violent conflict between capitalists and workers, with a need for measures to address these problems. Progressivism has influenced various political movements. Social liberalism was influenced by British liberal philosopher John Stuart Mill's conception of people being "progressive beings." British prime minister Benjamin Disraeli developed progressive conservatism under one-nation Toryism.

The first modern socialists of the 19th century followed utopian socialism, and experienced pushback from progressive socialism. This reformist approach was reflected in a readiness to question revolutionary tenets of Marxist orthodoxy, as well as challenges to sections of scientific socialism. G.A. Kleene, a 19th-century economist, defined progressive socialism as Eduard Bernstein's stand against "'Old-School' Marxism." Progressive socialism has historically been associated with reformist openness to question scientific socialism, such as by criticizing the law of growing misery.

In France, the space between social revolution and the socially conservative laissez-faire centre-right was filled with the emergence of radicalism which thought that social progress required anti-clericalism, humanism, and republicanism. Especially anti-clericalism was the dominant influence on the centre-left in many French- and Romance-speaking countries until the mid-20th century. In Imperial Germany, Chancellor Otto von Bismarck enacted various progressive social welfare measures out of paternalistic conservative motivations to distance workers from the socialist movement of the time and as humane ways to assist in maintaining the Industrial Revolution.

In 1891, the Roman Catholic Church encyclical Rerum novarum issued by Pope Leo XIII condemned the exploitation of labor and urged support for labor unions and government regulation of businesses in the interests of social justice while upholding the property right and criticising socialism. A progressive Protestant outlook called the Social Gospel emerged in North America that focused on challenging economic exploitation and poverty and, by the mid-1890s, was common in many Protestant theological seminaries in the United States.

=== 20th century: U.S. Progressive Era, New Deal and post-war consensus ===
Early 20th-century progressivism included support for American engagement in World War I and the creation of and participation in the League of Nations, compulsory sterilisation in Scandinavia, and eugenics in Great Britain, and the temperance movement. Progressives believed that progress was stifled by economic inequality, inadequately regulated monopolistic corporations, and conflict between workers and elites, arguing that corrective measures were needed.

In the United States, progressivism began as an intellectual rebellion against the political philosophy of Constitutionalism as expressed by John Locke and the Founding Fathers of America, whereby the authority of government depends on observing limitations on its just powers. What began as a social movement in the 1890s grew into a popular political movement referred to as the Progressive Era; in the 1912 United States presidential election, all three U.S. presidential candidates claimed to be progressives. While the term progressivism represents a range of diverse political pressure groups, not always united, progressives rejected social Darwinism, believing that the problems society faced, such as class warfare, greed, poverty, racism and violence, could best be addressed by providing good education, a safe environment, and an efficient workplace. Progressives lived mainly in the cities, were college educated, and believed in a strong central government. President Theodore Roosevelt of the Republican Party and later the Progressive Party declared that he "always believed that wise progressivism and wise conservatism go hand in hand."

Roosevelt made conservation a central concern of his presidency and helped bring environmental protection to the forefront of national politics . He viewed conservation as more than simply protecting nature. Roosevelt also believed that the nation's natural resources should remain available for the benefit of the public rather than being controlled primarily for the advantage of particular individuals or businesses. Roosevelt relied heavily on Gifford Pinchot, head of the Bureau of Forestry, to develop and administer his environmental policies. He strengthened Pinchot's authority by moving responsibility for national forests from the Department of the Interior to the Bureau of Forestry, which operated under the Agriculture Department. The bureau was subsequently reorganized as the United States Forest Service, with Pinchot directing the expansion of federal conservation programs within the national forests. Roosevelt also supported the Newlands Reclamation Act of 1902, which authorized federal dam and irrigation projects intended in part to assist small farmers and brought 230 million acres under federal protection. The Antiquities Act, enacted by Congress in 1906, further expanded federal conservation authority by allowing the president to designate national monuments on federal property. During his presidency, Roosevelt placed more federal land under protection through national parks, nature preserves, and other conservation measures than all previous presidents combined. He also created the Inland Waterways Commission to develop a coordinated approach to water resources, balancing conservation with transportation and economic needs. In 1908, he brought state governors together at the Conference of Governors to discuss conservation and the management of natural resources. Roosevelt subsequently formed the National Conservation Commission to conduct a comprehensive assessment of the country's natural resources. However, resistance to the scope of Roosevelt's conservation program curtailed further initiatives near the end of his presidency. The disputes surrounding his environmental policies also helped set the stage for the Pinchot–Ballinger controversy under President Taft.

Progressive Era

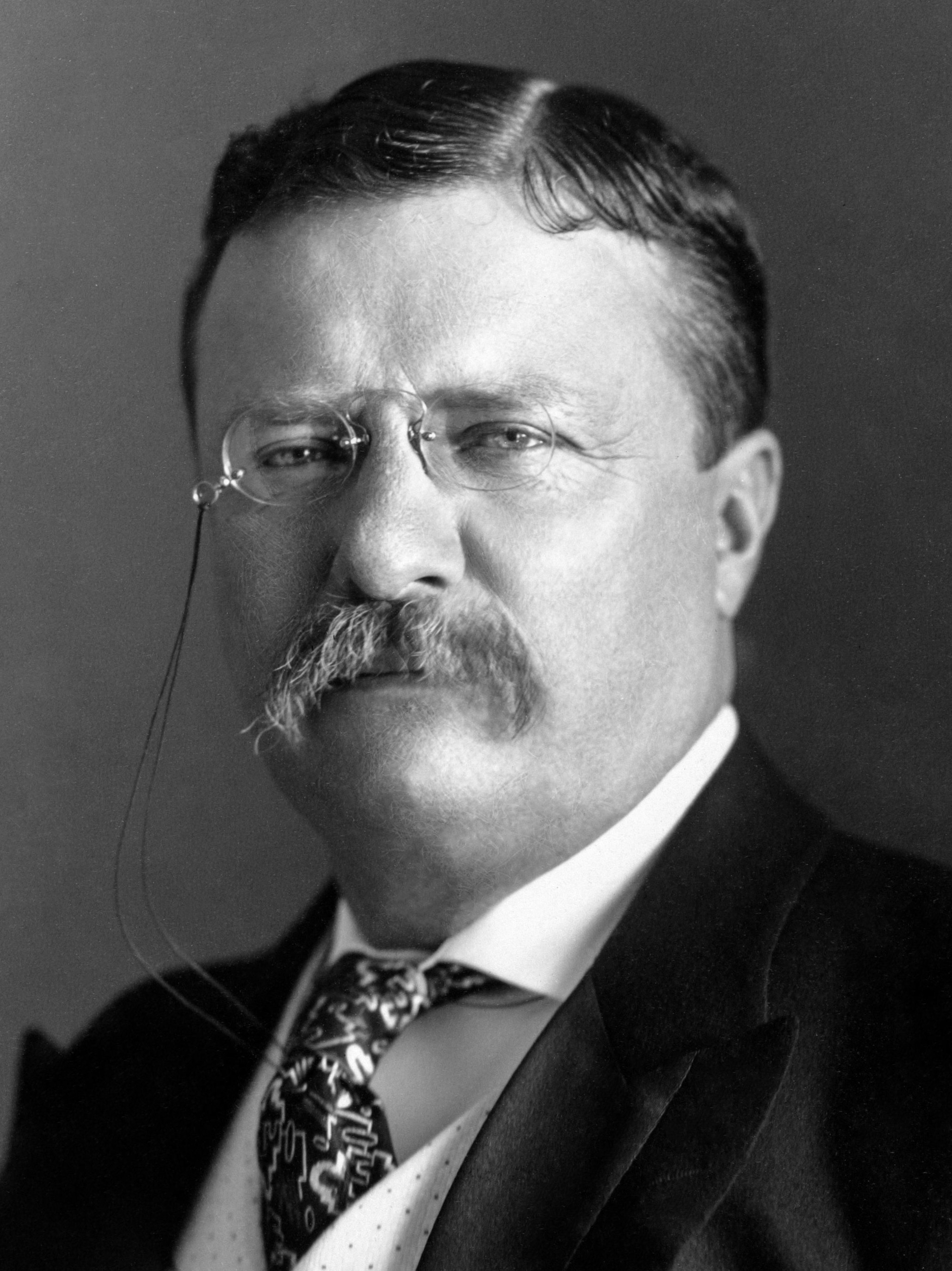
Theodore Roosevelt, 26th U.S. President

Woodrow Wilson, 28th U.S. President

President Woodrow Wilson was also a member of the American progressive movement within the Democratic Party. Progressive stances have evolved. Imperialism was a controversial issue within progressivism in the late 19th and early 20th centuries, particularly in the United States, where some progressives supported American imperialism while others opposed it. In response to World War I, President Woodrow Wilson's Fourteen Points established the concept of national self-determination and criticised imperialist competition and colonial injustices. Anti-imperialists supported these views in areas resisting imperial rule.

New Deal and Post-war consensus

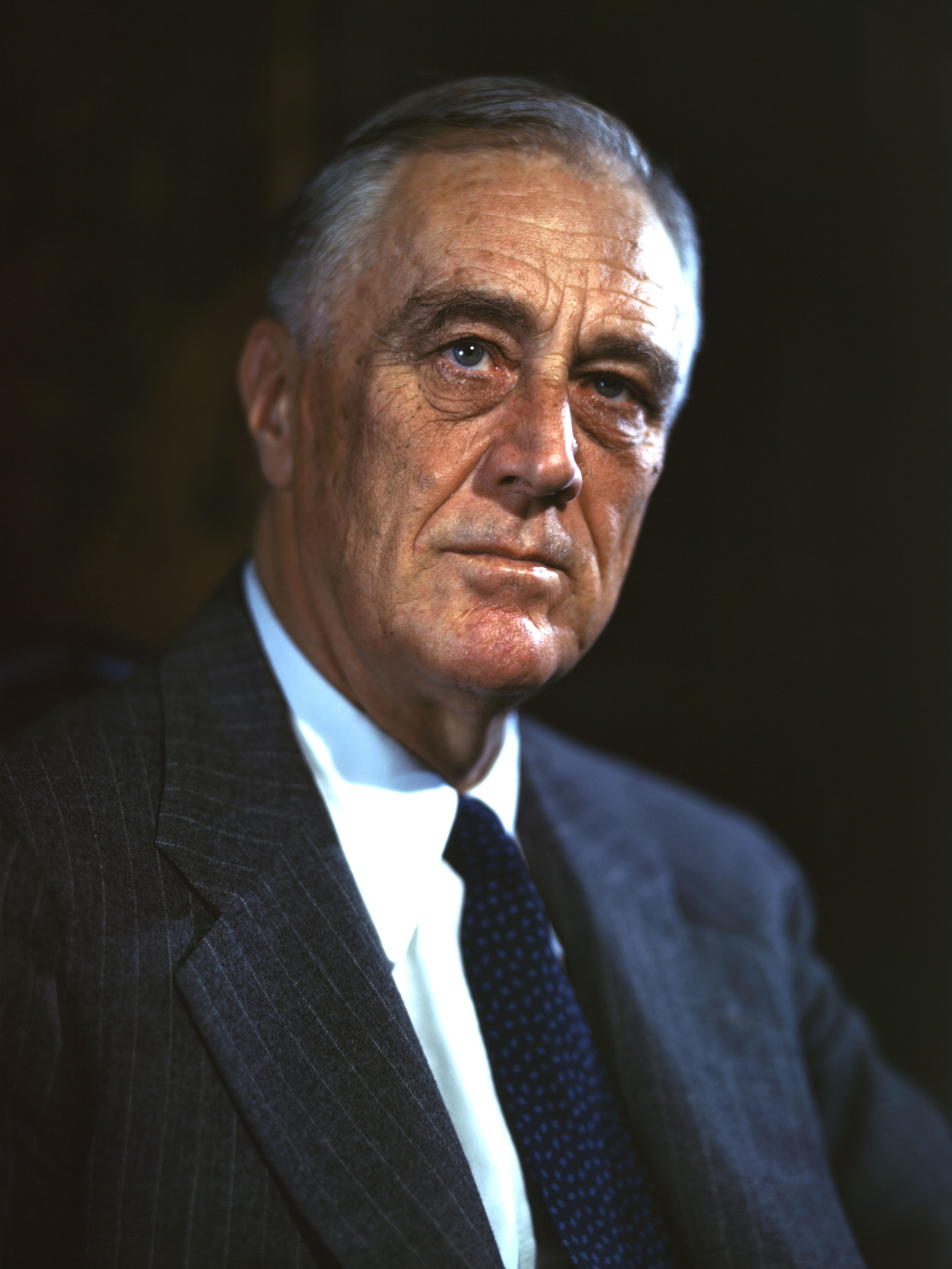
Franklin D. Roosevelt, 32nd U.S. President, progressive liberal

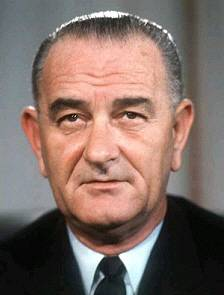
Lyndon B. Johnson, 36th U.S. President, progressive liberal

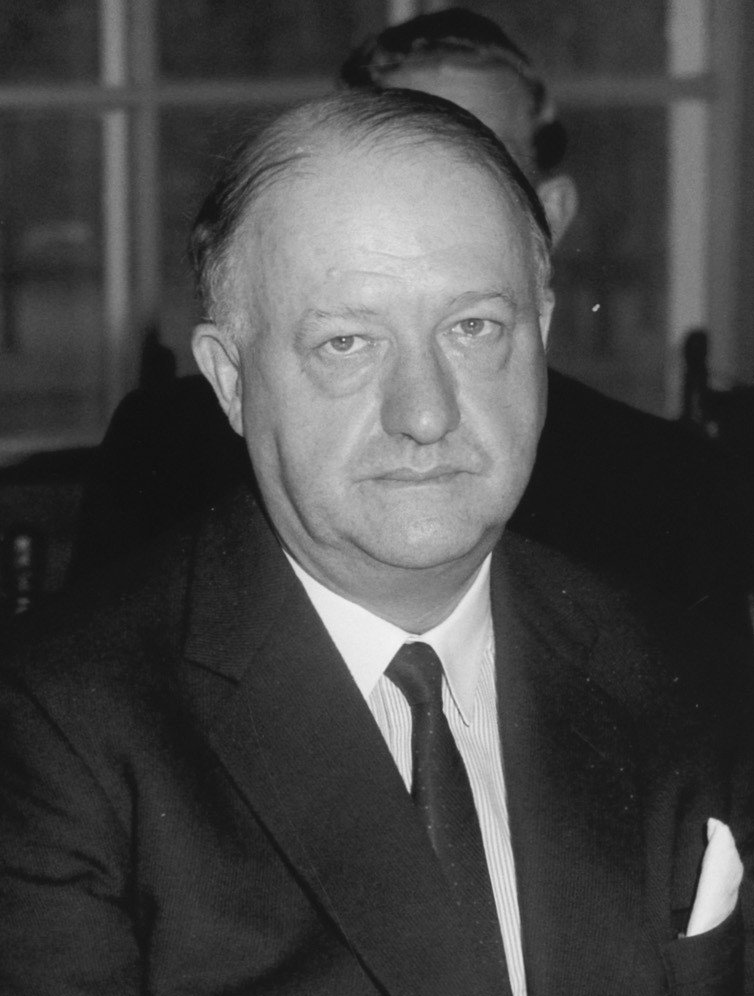
Rab Butler, a Deputy Prime Minister and U.K. First Secretary of State, progressive conservative

During the period of acceptance of economic Keynesianism (the 1930s–1970s), there was widespread acceptance in many nations of a large role for state intervention in the economy. The "progressive" brand was frequently identified with supporters of the New Deal by the year 1936. While the more progressive Second New Deal was more controversial in the public, the progressive consensus of the New Deal was strong, and even future moderate Republican presidents like Dwight D. Eisenhower and Richard Nixon worked to preserve it. The New Deal provided the context for future expansive progressive programs, especially the Great Society measures of Lyndon Johnson's administration. With the rise of neoliberalism and challenges to state interventionist policies in the 1970s and 1980s, centre-left progressive movements responded by adopting the Third Way, which emphasised a major role for the market economy. There have been social democrats who have called for the social-democratic movement to move past Third Way. Prominent progressive conservative elements in the British Conservative Party, such as from the likes of Rab Butler, promoted the post-war consensus, and others have criticised neoliberalism.

== Into the 21st century and social democratic turn ==
=== Influence of the Nordic Model ===
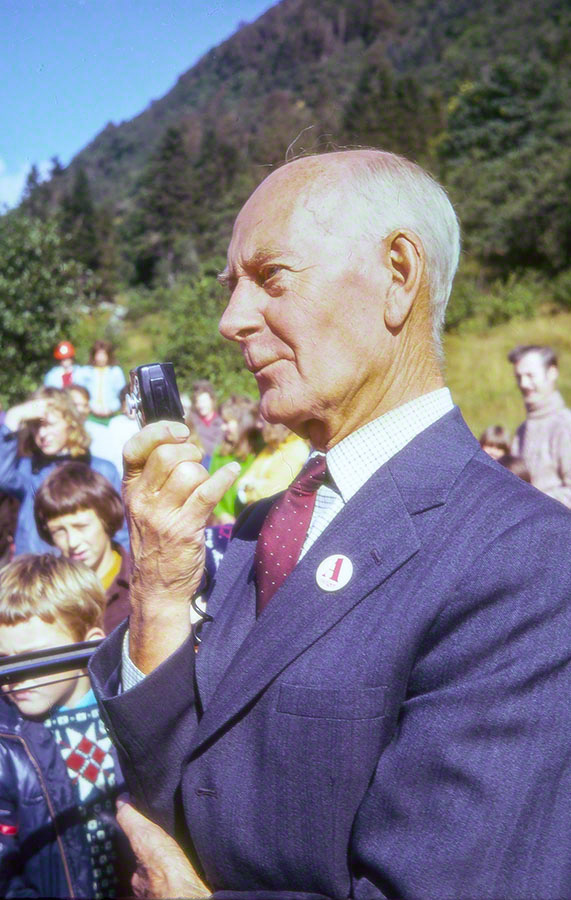
Gerhardsen at a rally in Bergen in the late-1960s

Many analysts have noted that 21st-century progressivism has focused on tax-funded social benefits inspired by the Nordic model, noting Bernie Sanders as an example of this advocacy and policy approach. Norway's progressive tradition has roots that reach back even before the modern welfare state. In 1884, 171 prominent Norwegian figures, including five future prime ministers, helped establish the Norwegian Association for Women's Rights. The organization campaigned for women's access to education, the right to vote, the right to work, and greater equality between men and women. These efforts helped establish women's equality as an important part of Norwegian political life. By the 1970s, gender equality had become an increasingly important part of government policy, with the state creating institutions to promote equality and combat discrimination.

Einar Gerhardsen was a central figure in the development of Norwegian social democracy. After beginning in the socialist labour movement and briefly aligning with its communist wing, he and the Norwegian Labour Party pushed for reform-minded democratic socialism. His political rise was interrupted by the German occupation, during which he became involved in the resistance, was arrested and tortured, and spent much of the war imprisoned in Norway and Germany. After liberation in 1945, Gerhardsen helped lead the country through reconstruction, serving several terms as prime minister. Under his leadership, Labour governments expanded state regulation, industrial development, progressive taxation, redistribution, and social security. These policies helped reduce poverty and unemployment while laying much of the foundation for Norway's modern welfare state. Gerhardsen's legacy therefore came to represent both democratic government and greater economic security and social equality.

=== International organizing ===
Progressive Alliance

Founded in Leipzig, Germany, on May 22, 2013, the Progressive Alliance is an international political organization made up primarily of social democratic political parties and organizations. The organization was established as a substitute for the already-existing Socialist International, of which many of its constituent parties are either present or previous members. In January 2012, Sigmar Gabriel, then chairman of the Social Democratic Party of Germany (SPD), decided to terminate the SPD's annual membership fee of £100,000 to the Socialist International. Gabriel criticized Socialist International for admitting and maintaining undemocratic political movements, leading to the establishment of the Progressive Alliance. The organization has a stated goal to become the worldwide network of "the progressive, democratic, social-democratic, socialist, and labour movement."

Progressive International

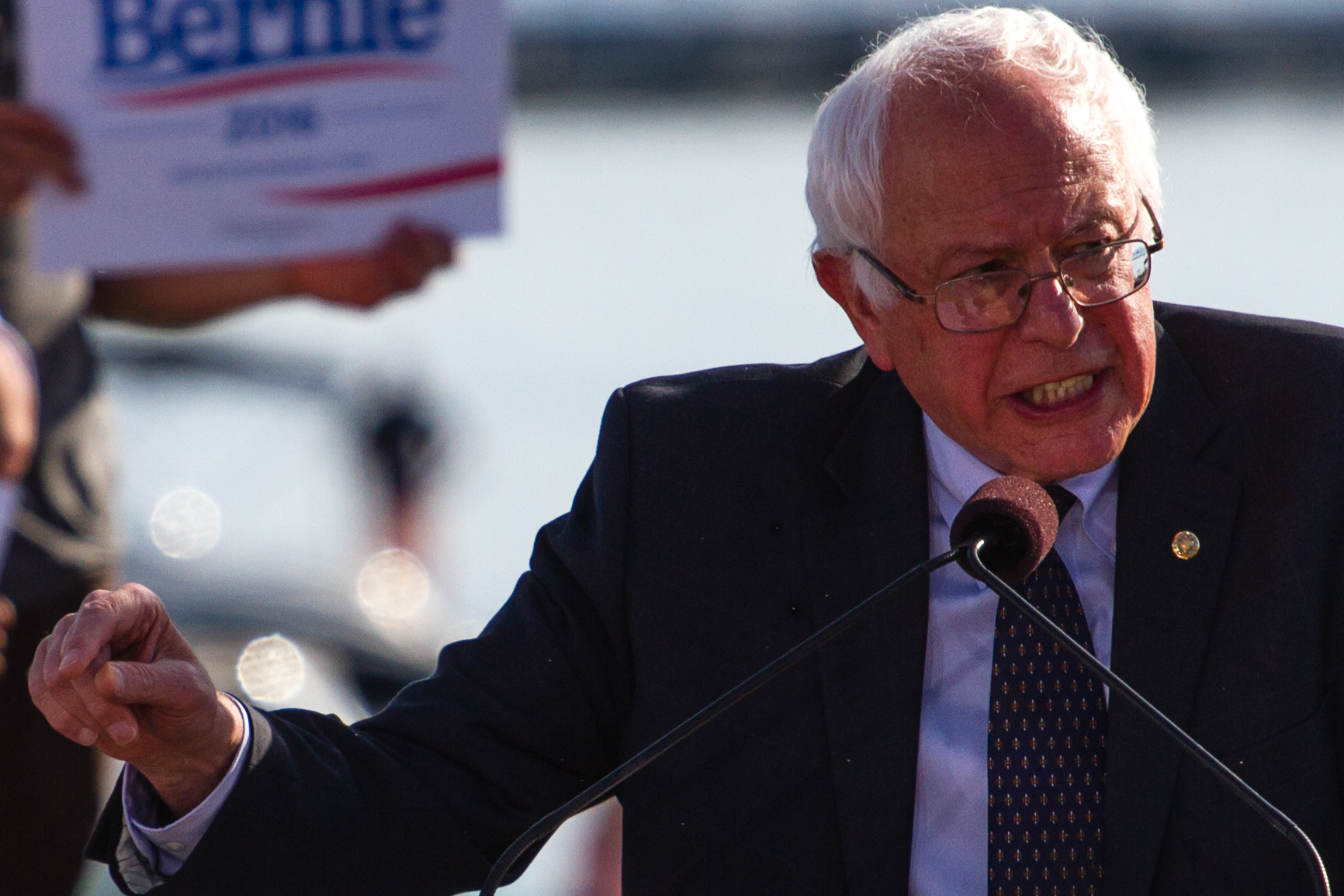
Bernie Sanders, United States Senator from Vermont

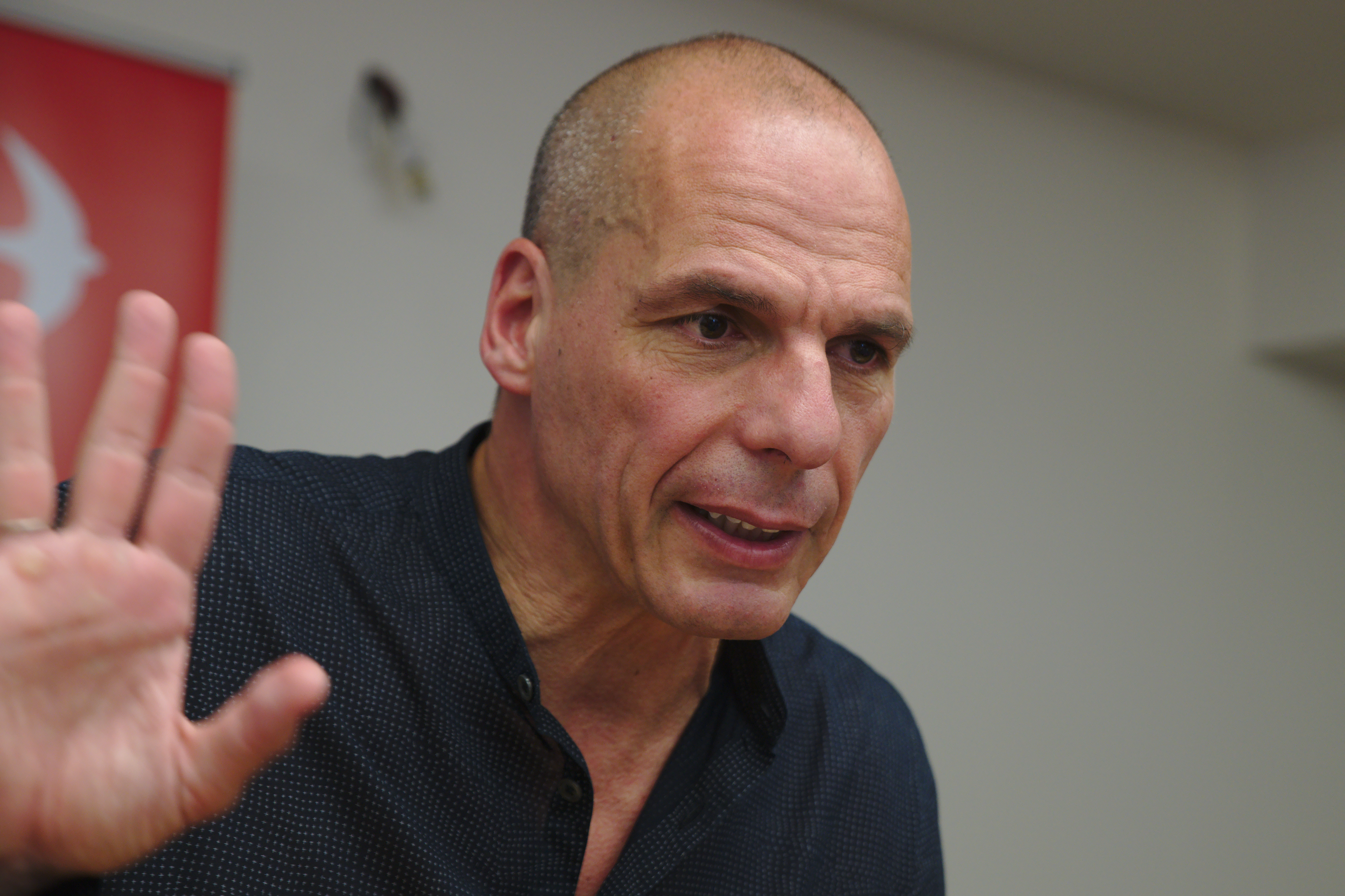
Yanis Varoufakis, former Greek Minister of Finance

PI logo

In May 2020, Progressive International was formally founded and launched on 11 May 2020, responding to a 2018 open call by the Democracy in Europe Movement and the Sanders Institute for united progressive forces around the globe. The open call was echoing two twinned appeals published in 2018 by U.S. senator Bernie Sanders and Yanis Varoufakis, who is a Greek economist and self-described libertarian Marxist, to form an international movement to combat the rise of hard right authoritarianism and potential neofascist global influence represented by U.S. president Donald Trump. PI's founding was supported by a group of 40 advisors including Ece Temelkuran, Katrín Jakobsdóttir, Yanis Varoufakis, Carola Rackete, Nick Estes, Vanessa Nakate, Noam Chomsky, Arundhati Roy, Naomi Klein, Niki Ashton, Rafael Correa, Fernando Haddad, Celso Amorim, and Alvaro Garcia Linera. PI seeks to combat authoritarian nationalism around the world and is opposed to what it describes as disaster capitalism.

=== Europe ===
==== Norway ====
Norwegian social democracy

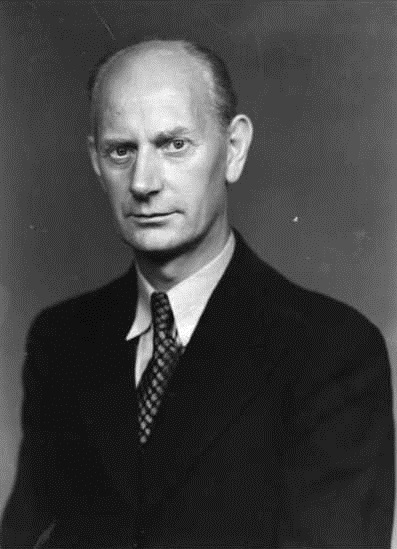
Einar Gerhardsen, Prime Minister of Norway for 17 years starting with a sweeping Labour victory in the 1945 Norwegian parliamentary election, who greatly strengthened Norway's welfare state

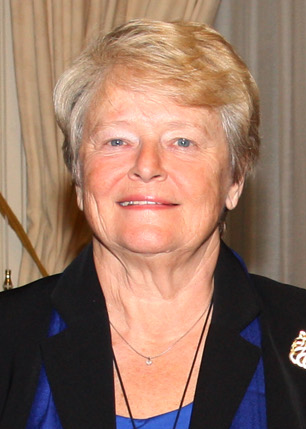
Gro Harlem Brundtland, three-time Prime Minister of Norway who was the first female to serve in the position and moderated social democratic governance with degrees of market liberalization

Rather than viewing economic growth and social welfare as competing goals, Norwegian governments have generally attempted to combine a productive economy with a strong social safety net. After Gerhardsen, the next major transformational stage in the development of Norwegian social democracy was associated with Gro Harlem Brundtland, who followed Gerhardsen's generation and became Norway's first woman prime minister. Brundtland served three separate periods as prime minister: briefly in 1981, from 1986 to 1989, and again from 1990 to 1996. Her long political career made her an important symbol of women's increasing participation in Norwegian political life, and she became affectionately known as Landsmoderen, or "Mother of the Nation." Brundtland represented a somewhat different form of social democracy from the industrial-centered model associated with the early Labour governments. During the economic difficulties of the 1980s, Norway faced problems including falling oil prices, economic stagnation, and pressure on government finances. Brundtland responded by accepting some market-oriented reforms rather than attempting to preserve a completely state-directed economy.

Gender equality was also central to Brundtland's political approach. In 1986, she appointed a cabinet in which approximately 40 percent of the ministers were women, a remarkable change for the period. Her governments expanded paid parental leave and developed state-supported childcare, helping make it easier for both men and women to participate in the workforce. These policies reflected a broader idea that gender equality was not simply a question of individual rights. It was also connected to the economy because a society that enables women to work and pursue careers can make fuller use of its population's skills and abilities. Brundtland also helped connect Norwegian social democracy with the growing environmental movement. As chair of the United Nations World Commission on Environment and Development, she led the work that produced the influential 1987 report Our Common Future. The report helped popularize the modern concept of sustainable development, arguing that economic development should meet the needs of the present without preventing future generations from meeting their own needs. This approach connected three goals that had often been treated separately: economic growth, social equality, and protection of the environment. Brundtland helped broaden the meaning of Norwegian social democracy and expand it toward more inclusive capitalism.

The Labour Party continued to change after Brundtland's era. Jens Stoltenberg, who served as prime minister from 2000 to 2001 and again from 2005 to 2013, represented a more modernized form of social democracy sometimes associated with the Third Way. Like other center-left leaders of the period, Stoltenberg placed greater emphasis on economic efficiency, international competition, and the use of market mechanisms. His governments continued the movement toward partial privatization and reform of some state-owned enterprises while maintaining Norway's extensive welfare system. Norway had discovered large quantities of oil in the North Sea beginning in the late 1960s, creating enormous potential wealth. Rather than spending all of the oil revenue immediately, Norway placed much of it into a sovereign wealth fund. The fiscal rule established a framework for determining how much of that wealth could be used in the national budget, helping prevent the economy from becoming overly dependent on oil revenue and preserving wealth for future generations.

The next major phase came under Jonas Gahr Støre, who became prime minister in 2021. Støre inherited a country with a highly developed welfare state and substantial wealth, but also faced new challenges. These included concerns about economic inequality, the future of the welfare system, and the growing urgency of climate change. His government presented itself as seeking a more equitable economic model, with greater emphasis on reducing inequality, protecting workers, and maintaining accessible public services. Støre's approach has placed particular emphasis on finding a balance between economic security and environmental change. Norway remains a major producer of oil and natural gas, so moving toward a lower-emission economy presents a difficult challenge. Støre has sought to reduce emissions while also protecting employment and preventing greater inequality. His government has therefore treated the transition toward a lower-carbon economy as a process that should create new industries and jobs rather than simply eliminate existing economic activity.

Norwegian social democracy continues to be shaped by debate within the broader left. After the 2025 parliamentary election, Labour remained the largest party in a left-leaning bloc but depended on smaller parties such as the Socialist Left, Greens, and Reds, which generally press for stronger climate policies and greater economic redistribution. Major disagreements include oil policy, with Labour supporting continued petroleum production while parties farther left advocate a faster transition away from fossil fuels, as well as taxation and investment, where smaller left-wing parties favor greater redistribution and, in some cases, tighter ethical restrictions on Norway's sovereign wealth fund. While Labour currently occupies a relatively moderate position compared to its historically economic progressive legacy under Gerhardsen, socialist and Green parties continue to push for a more expansive social democracy encapsulated by stronger environmental and redistributive policies.

Norway's commitment to equality continued to expand beyond economic class. Beginning in the second half of the twentieth century, Norwegian governments increasingly adopted legal protections against discrimination based on factors such as ethnicity, religion, disability, and sexual orientation. Gender equality also became firmly established in Norwegian law and public policy. Norway's progressive approach to LGBT rights developed alongside these broader changes. The country became an early leader in legal protections for gay and lesbian people. In 1993, Norway established registered partnerships for same-sex couples. In 2008, the Storting approved a common marriage law for same-sex and opposite-sex couples, which took effect on January 1, 2009. The law gave same-sex couples the same legal right to marry and also expanded their rights concerning adoption and assisted reproduction. Later legislation further strengthened protections against discrimination based on sexual orientation, gender identity, and gender expression.

==== United Kingdom ====
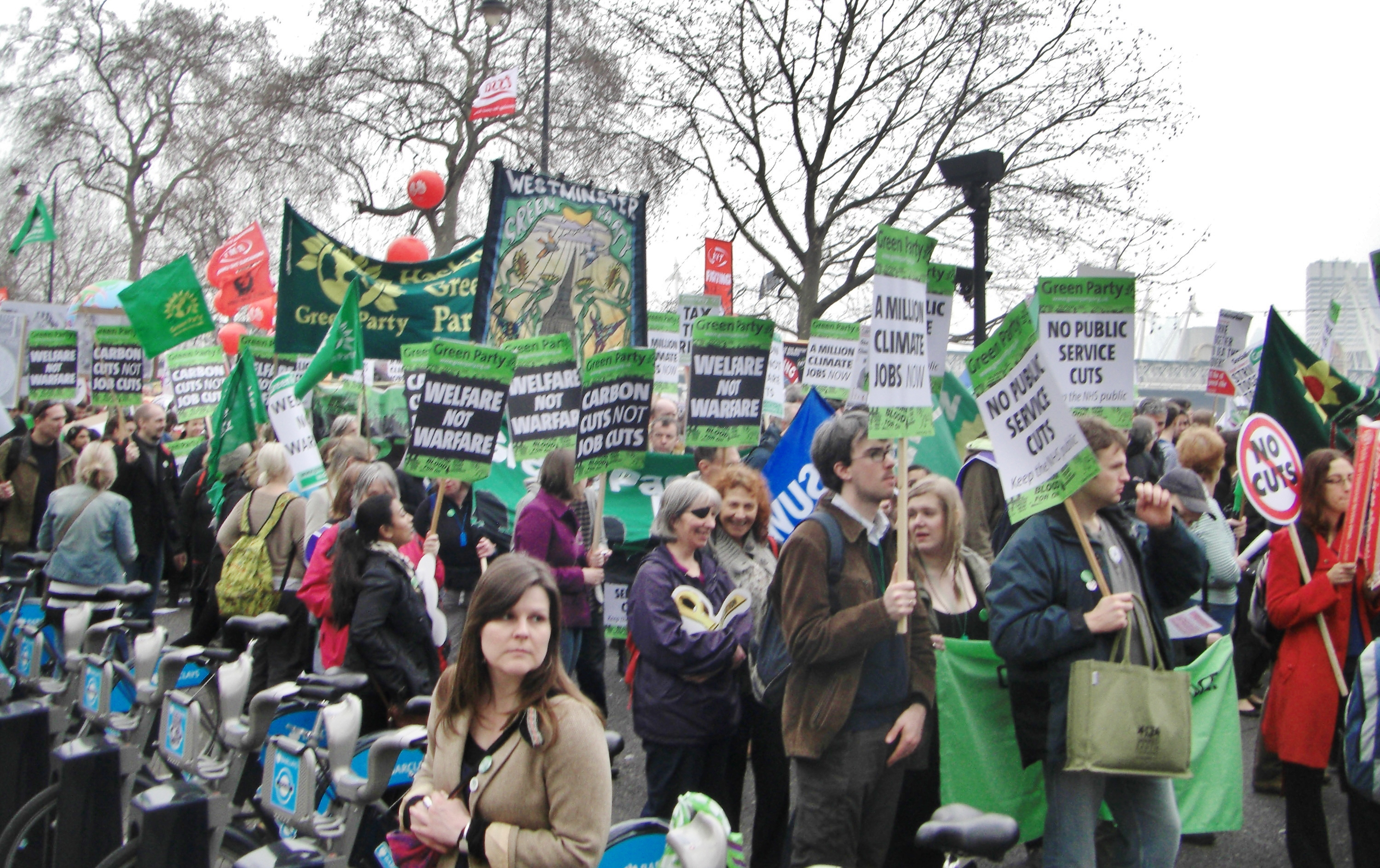
Greens taking part in the 2011 London anti-cuts protest in the United Kingdom

20th century progressivism in the United Kingdom highlights enduring tension and factionalism between more avowedly left-wing progressives and those who incorporate more syncretic politics into their progressivism. Groups like the Institute for Public Policy Research, the Fabian Society, and Progressive Britain are organizations represent a wide variety of U.K. progressive thought. Progressivism in the United Kingdom has seen shifts from New Labour's early dominance to the rise of cultural liberalism, environmentalism from the Green Party, and grassroots democracy movements with a variety of focuses, including pro-Palestine anti-war causes, radical democracy, and universal basic income. Tony Blair's government represented a significant period of progressive growth, although his politics were more centrist than previous progressive movements that leaned further left, and his government faced criticisms for its Third Way market-oriented policies and emphasis on deregulation. The Blairite consensus was dominant within U.K. progressivism from the mid-1990s and through the end of Blair's premiership, which ended in 2007. New Labour continued to evolve with the subsequent Labour leadership of Gordon Brown and was formally abandoned by his successor, Ed Miliband, for One Nation Labour in 2010.

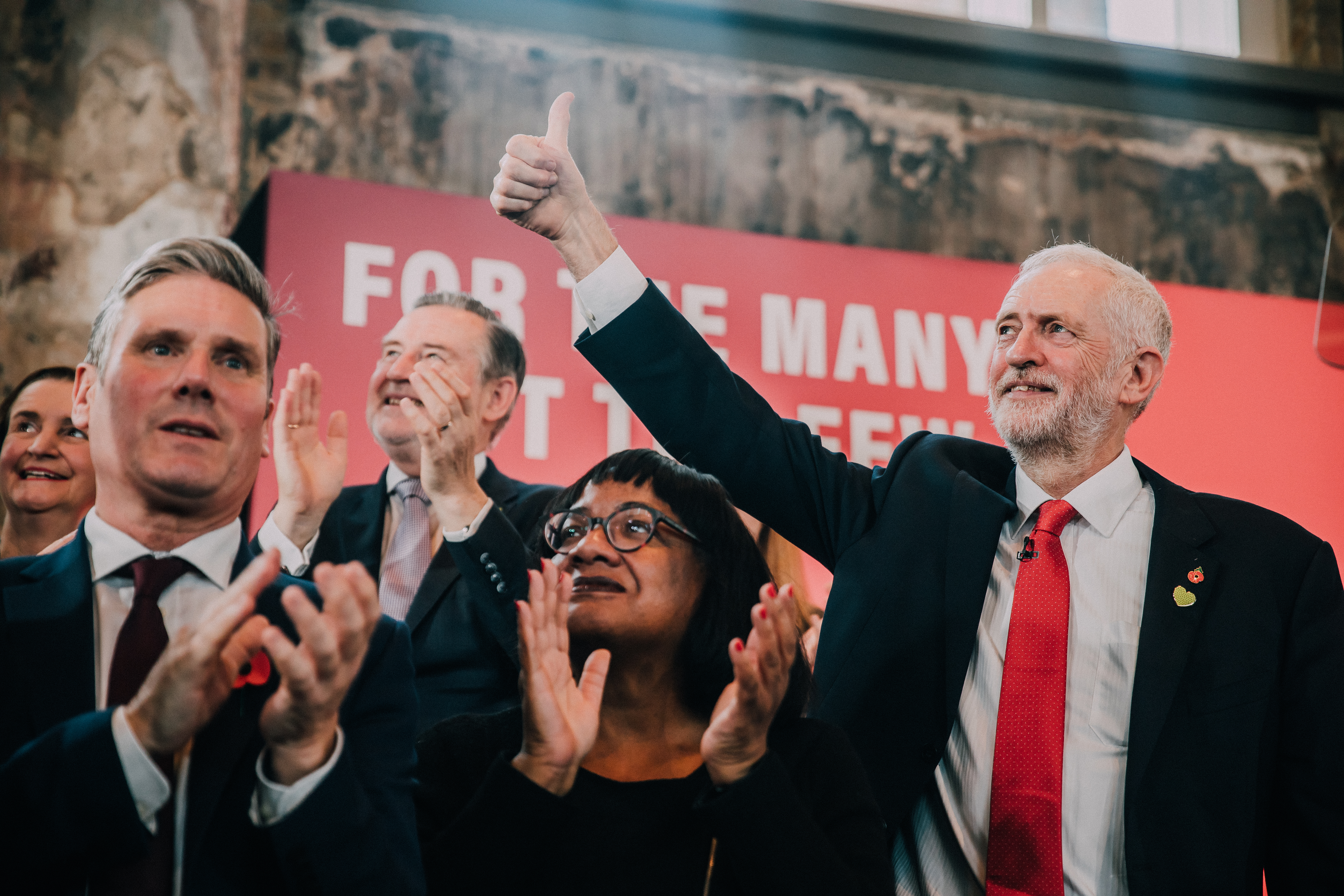
Jeremy Corbyn (right), U.K. Labour leader from 2015 to 2020, and Keir Starmer (left), U.K. Prime Minister from July 5, 2024 to July 22, 2026

Jeremy Corbyn represented a staunch return of the Labour party platform to its more historic democratic socialism with a focus on nationalization, robust public spending, and both anti-austerity and anti-war stances. Corbyn appealed to a progressive left base disillusioned with previous Labour governments, but he was a controversial figure in the party who oscillated between a loyal base of support and electability concerns. Subsequent leader and eventual prime minister Keir Starmer shifted Labour toward pragmatic, economically cautious centrism, striving for electability by striking a balance between broad public appeal, traditional Labour beliefs, and Starmer's own conviction that economic changes made previous more left-wing economic positions untenable.

The animosity between Corbyn and Starmer intensified with Starmer's suspension of Corbyn from Labour in 2020, accusing Corbyn of an inadequate response to antisemitism. Corbyn was supported against these accusations by Progressive International. Starmer said in 2023 that "the very best of progressive politics is found in our determination to push Britain forward," but "there are precious things – in our way of life, in our environment, in our communities – that it is our responsibility to protect and preserve and to pass on to future generations. If that sounds Conservative, then let me tell you: I don't care." Corbyn supported the foundation of the socialist Your Party in 2025 with Zarah Sultana in a further schism for U.K. left-leaning progressive politics. Facing challenges from Brexit and increased right-wing presence, contemporary progressivism in the United Kingdom can be characterized by increasing cultural liberalism and factionalism surrounding the role of capitalism in society. Starmer was viewed largely unfavourably by the British public during his tenure as prime minister. His net approval rating began slightly positive, declining over the course of his premiership to an average of −46% by November 2025. By the end of 2025, opinion polls rated Starmer as one of Britain's most unpopular prime ministers, being compared to Liz Truss. Labour's losses in the local elections in May 2026 and discontent over policy led to calls for Starmer to resign as leader, and to the resignation of several members of the government, including Health Secretary Wes Streeting.

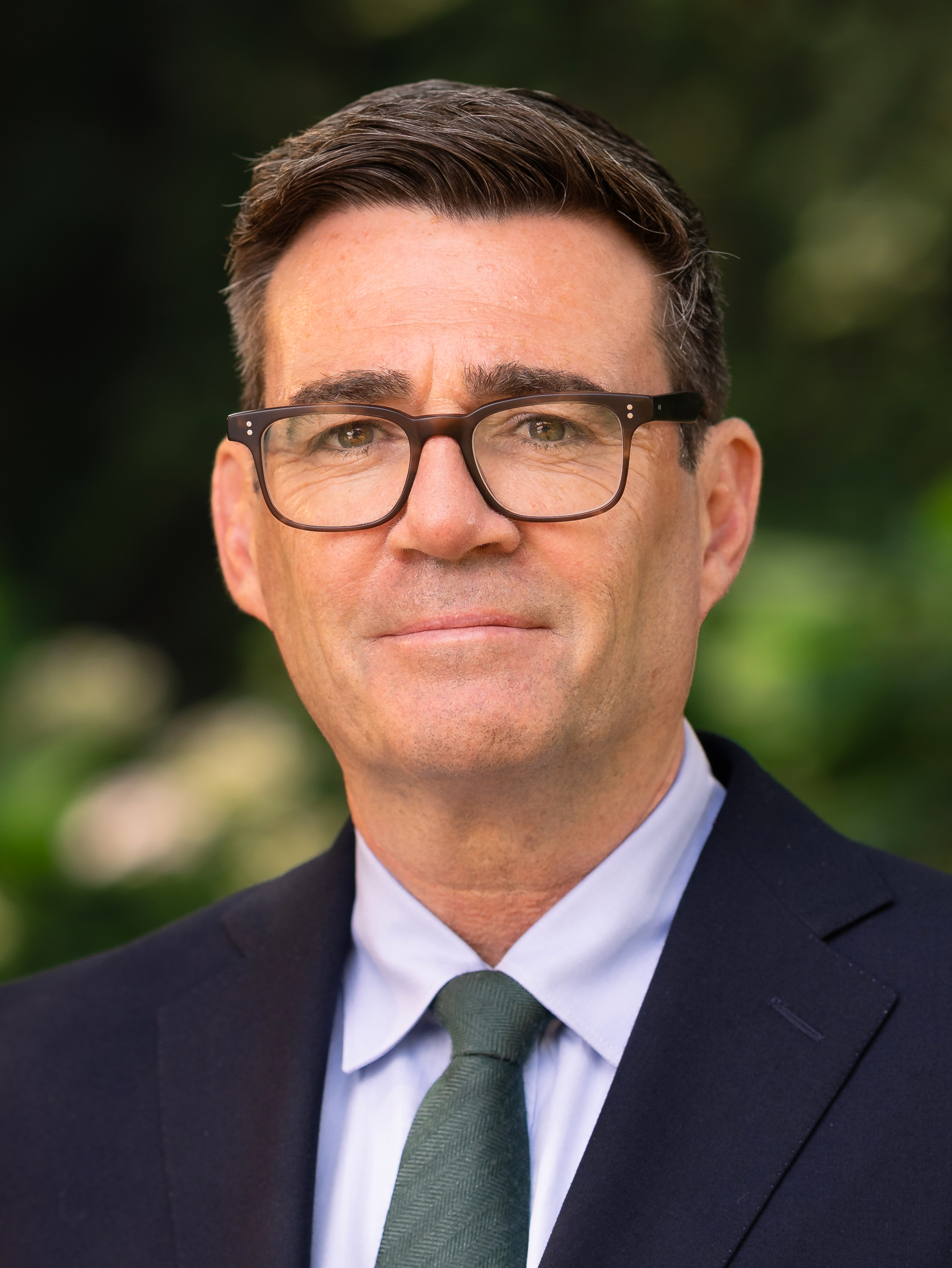
Andy Burnham, incumbent Prime Minister of the United Kingdom

Andy Burnham, who at the time was mayor of Greater Manchester and cited as Britain's most popular politician was blocked by Labour's National Executive Committee from running in the 2026 Gorton and Denton by-election. On 18 June 2026, a by-election was held in Makerfield after sitting MP Josh Simons resigned to allow Burnham to stand for a seat in Parliament and potentially challenge Starmer for the Labour leadership. It was the first time since the 1965 Leyton by-election that a by-election was caused to provide a vacancy for a person not currently in Parliament. Burnham won the by-election with almost 25,000 votes and a majority of over 9,200 votes. Four days following the election, Starmer announced his resignation, leading to a leadership election. After being nominated by over 90% of Labour MPs, Burnham was elected unopposed as leader, becoming prime minister on July 20, 2026, as the first Labour and Co-operative Party MP to hold the post. Burnham has been cited as pushing a more progressive and left-populist agenda in his premiership than Starmer especially regarding Burnham's noted preference for market socialist policies.

=== Latin America ===
==== Argentina ====
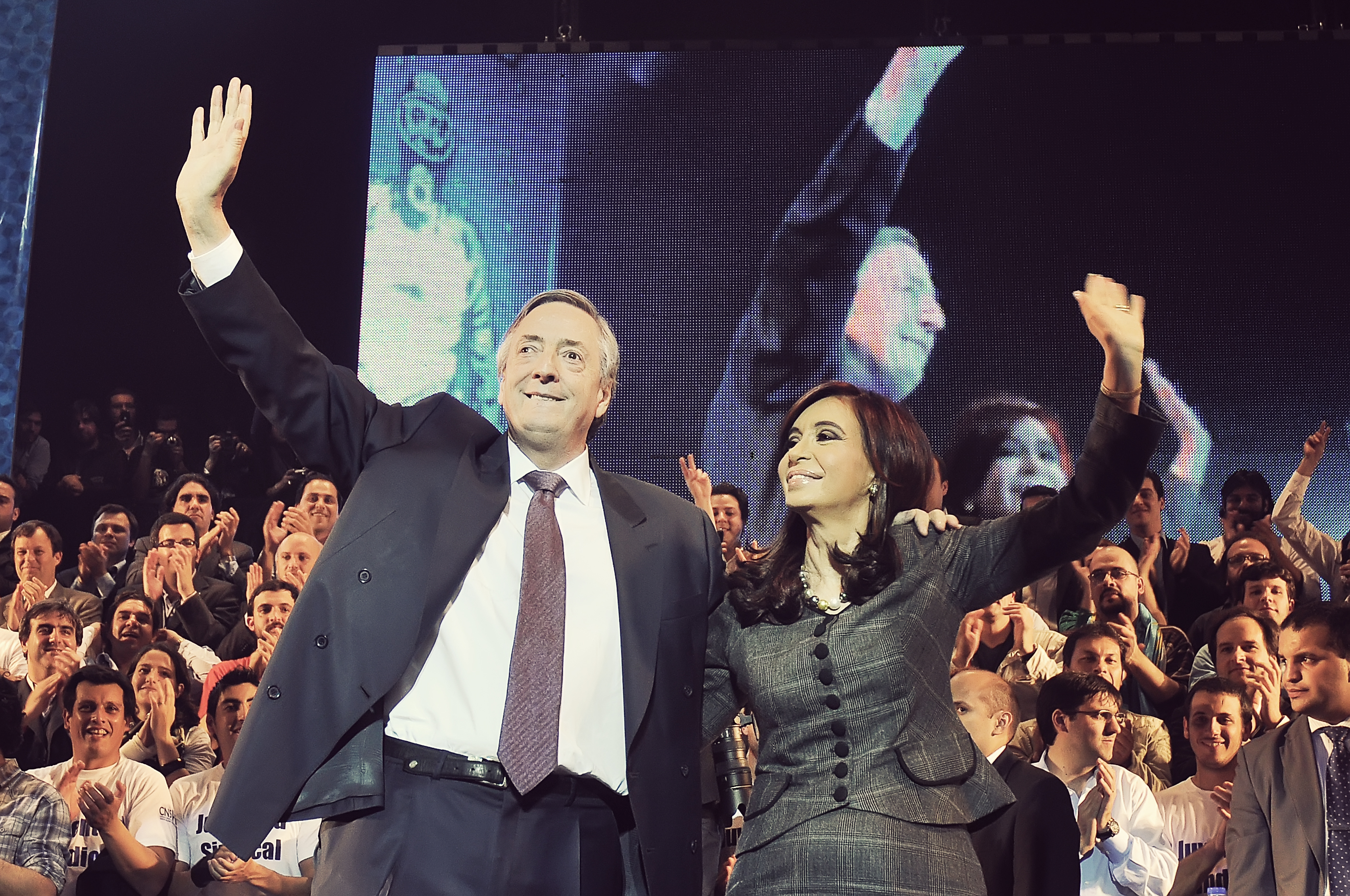
Néstor Kirchner, 55th President of Argentina, and Cristina Fernández de Kirchner, 56th President, in September of 2010–one of their last public appearances before Néstor's death

Kirchnerism in Argentina refers to the political strategies of Néstor Kirchner and Cristina Fernández de Kirchner, who were successive Presidents of Argentina. In favor of his wife, Néstor Kirchner chose not to run for reelection in 2007 after taking office on May 25, 2003. After Isabel Perón, Cristina Fernández de Kirchner was the first woman to be elected directly to the presidency of Argentina. Cristina Kirchner has led the Justicialist Party since 2024. Kirchnerist policies are labeled Peronist, progressive, and left-wing. Social services were sponsored by Kirchnerist administrations, which were perceived as blatantly anti-neoliberal. Some political scientists propose the term "Pink Tide neopopulism" to characterize movements that are regarded as a response and a counter to neoliberalism. This is in contrast to the neoliberal populism that was prevalent in the 1990s. Kirchnerism is seen as a response and a counter to neoliberalism. Healthcare and income transfers were greatly increased, most notably by giving 15 million people—roughly 41% of the country's total population—free prescription drugs. Kirchnerists also adopted the traditional Peronist strategy of endorsing wage hikes and participating in labor battles. Argentina's period without widespread strikes during the Kirchnerist governments was only surpassed by the 1946–1955 era of Perón’s government.

==== Brazil ====
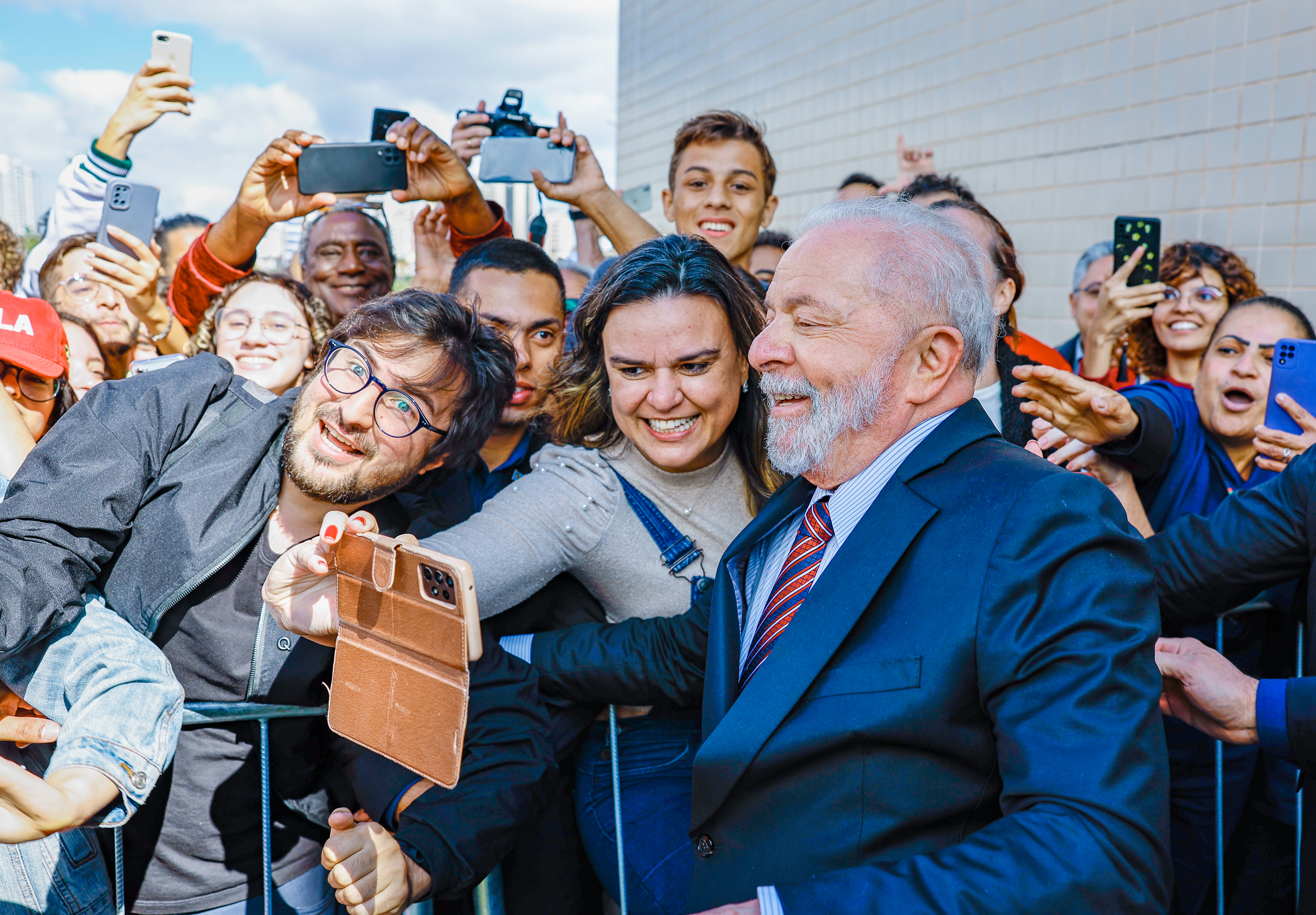
Luiz Inácio Lula da Silva, 35th and 39th President of Brazil, taking pictures with supporters at São Bernardo do Campo

Lulism in Brazil demonstrates the broad coalitional and reformist nature of contemporary progressivism. Luiz Inácio Lula da Silva's 2022 presidential comeback campaign was a progressive resurgence narrative focused on the working class and anti-corruption, running against incumbent right-wing populist President Jair Bolsonaro. Lula was 17% ahead of Bolsonaro in a poll in January 2022 in what was seen as an early sign of shifting progressive sentiment in the voting population against far-right politics of the Bolsonaro government. In the first round of the presidential election, Lula was in first place with 48% of the electorate, qualifying for the second round with Bolsonaro, who received 43% of the votes. Lula was elected in the second round on 30 October with 50.89% of the vote, the smallest margin in the history of Brazil's presidential elections. Lulism features an overlaps in political parties, including the Workers' Party founded by Lula. While seeing a democratic socialist society as the ultimate goal, Lula has called for a reformist "social liberal" approach to begin resolving poverty gap while acknowledging the reality of existing market structures.

==== Mexico ====
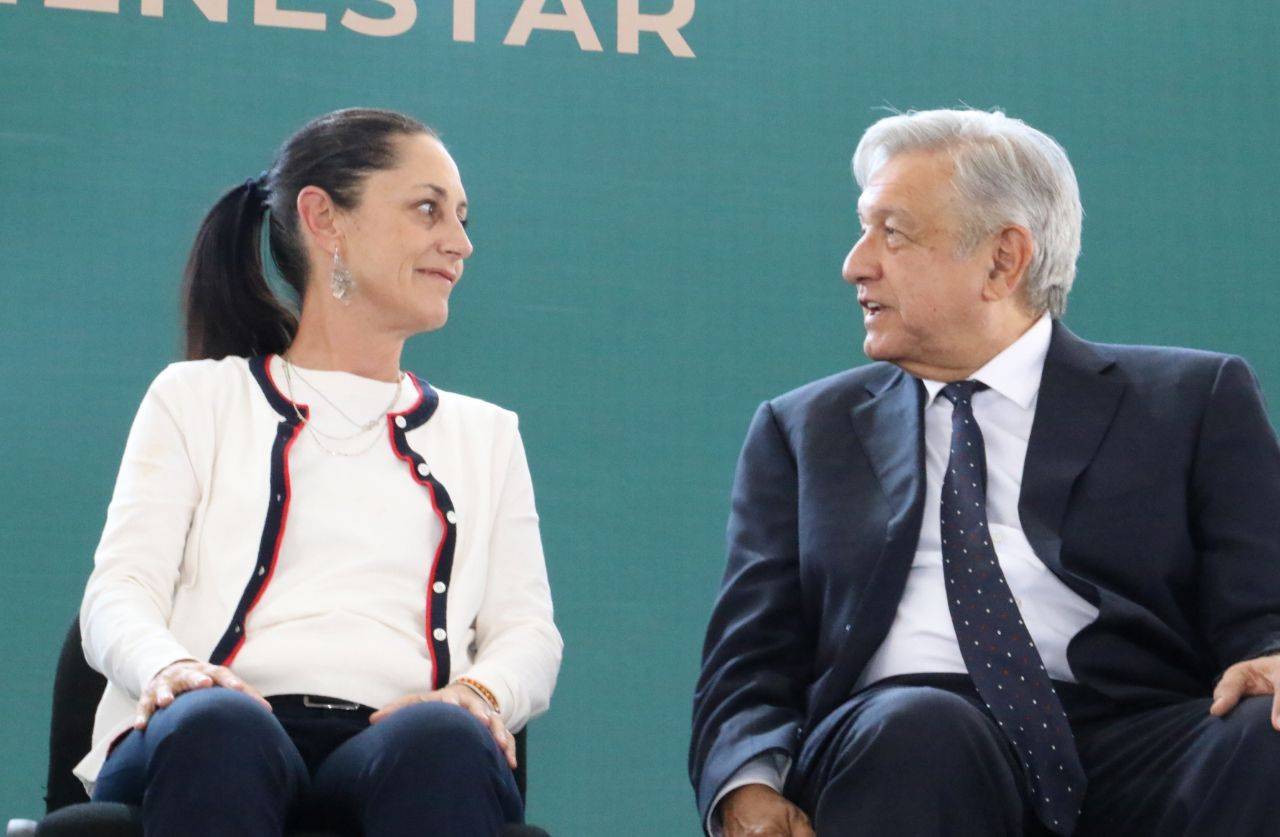
Andrés Manuel López Obrador (right), 65th President of Mexico, and Claudia Sheinbaum (left), then Head of Government of Mexico City and eventual 66th Mexican president, in June 2019

Described as a social democratic progressive and left-wing populist, Andrés Manuel López Obrador, or AMLO, was a national politician for over three decades, and ultimately elected President of Mexico following a 2018 landslide victory. López Obrador has been characterized as the "ideological twin" of Bernie Sanders and Jeremy Corbyn, and Corbyn invited López Obrador to the Parliament of the United Kingdom. After winning the 2019 election in Argentina, López Obrador formed a "progressive alliance" with President Alberto Fernández, as reported by El País, marking one of López Obrador's first official trips abroad to Mexico. During his presidency, López Obrador commenced a number of progressive social reforms and encouraged public investment in industries that had been liberalized by earlier administrations. His supporters commended him for reorienting the nation's neoliberal consensus toward bettering the working class's situation and for fostering institutional rejuvenation following decades of extreme inequality and corruption. While credited and praised by supporters for progressive reforms, López Obrador has also received criticism for illiberality and contributing to democratic backsliding.

One of López Obrador's first measures was to raise the minimum wage from MXN $88.36 to MXN $102.68, representing a 16.2% increase—the biggest since 1996. This revision had an immediate impact on average worker salaries, which increased by 5.7%. López Obrador executed his promised "Republican Austerity" upon taking office as well, which aimed to cut spending on political privileges and non-essential government products and services. He canceled presidential pensions and imposed a pay cap for government personnel, ensuring that no one could earn more than the president. López Obrador reduced his own compensation by 60% and chose not to live in Los Pinos, the expensive presidential complex with upkeep costs totaling around MXN $30 billion over the last two administrations. López Obrador auctioned away several government planes and helicopters including the presidential plane "José María Morelos y Pavón", for roughly MXN $1.658 billion. The auction revenues supported hospitals in Tlapa, Guerrero, and Tuxtepec, Oaxaca.

The AMLO presidency also aimed to streamline the bureaucratic structure of the Mexican government, which López Obrador characterized as benefiting elites and mismanaging public finances. The AMLO budgets often included spending cuts to various government agencies, including prosecutors and the public health system, leading to layoffs, salary reductions, and poorer services. To centralize operations and address the reduced workforce, López Obrador often utilized the military for infrastructure projects. López Obrador called for the removal of independent government bodies in February 2024, saying that they duplicated the work of some cabinet ministries, suggesting that their duties be taken over by the Mexican cabinet to save funds and promote government efficiency. The proposal faced widespread condemnation, including from opposition members who criticized it as retribution against autonomous agencies. In the same month, López Obrador successfully proposed a constitutional amendment requiring the minimum wage to consistently rise above the rate of inflation.

Claudia Sheinbaum, a member of the left-wing political party Morena, was widely perceived by her party as the frontrunner to succeed López Obrador, and she eventually received the candidacy of the ruling coalition, Sigamos Haciendo Historia. Xóchitl Gálvez emerged as the opposition frontrunner in Fuerza y Corazón por México. On October 1, 2024, Sheinbaum was sworn in as president, becoming the first woman and person of Jewish origin to assume the office. (Note: Carlos Salinas de Gortari, president of Mexico from 1988 to 1994, is of partial colonial-era Sephardic Jewish descent.) Ifigenia Martínez, president of the Congress of the Union and a noted figure for the Mexican left, awarded her the presidential sash. The Federal Telecommunications Institute (IFT), the Federal Economic Competition Commission (COFECE), the National Institute of Transparency for Access to Information and Personal Data Protection (INAI), the Energy Regulatory Commission (CRE), the National Hydrocarbons Commission (CNH), the National Council for the Evaluation of Social Development Policy (CONEVAL), the National Institute for the Evaluation of Education (MejorEdu), and the Federal Economic Competition Commission were among the seven autonomous agencies that Sheinbaum consolidated into executive authority. Critics claimed that the measure compromised openness, regulatory independence, and limits on executive power. On 5 February 2025, Sheinbaum offered a constitutional reform to Congress prohibiting immediate reelection and barring family members of sitting officeholders from campaigning for the same public offices. The Senate delayed implementation of the reform until 2030. The bill was published on 1 April.

=== North America ===
==== Canada ====
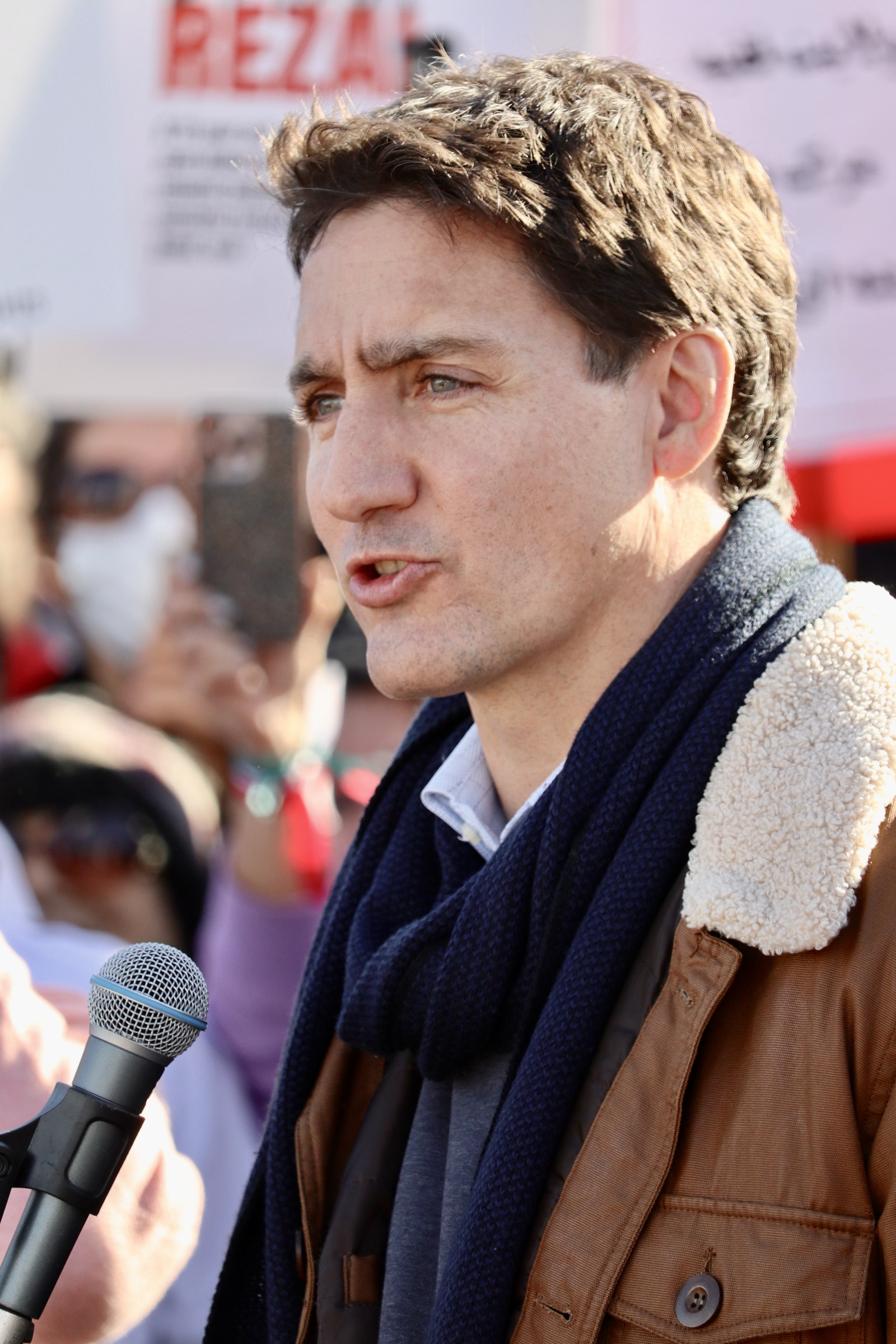
Justin Trudeau, 23rd Prime Minister of Canada, at a 2022 protest in Ottawa

While not a member of the Progressive Alliance like the further-left New Democratic Party, Canada's Liberal Party experienced progressive inclination in the 21st century from the premiership of Justin Trudeau, who was a self-described progressive liberal. The Trudeau government's economic vision was initially based on greater tax collections to compensate for increased government spending. While the government has not balanced the budget, it has cut Canada's debt-to-GDP ratio annually until 2020, when the COVID-19 pandemic struck. Trudeau self-described his cultural policy as staunchly feminist and progressive, and his government advocated for the advancement of abortion rights, introduced the bill that made Canadian conversion therapies illegal, established the right to medically-assisted death, and legalized cannabis for recreational use. Trudeau made the announcement in 2021 that a national strategy for child care would be developed with the objective of lowering the cost of day care at a rate of ten dollars per day for each child during a period of five years. The Trudeau administration supported green politics through new pledges to reduce greenhouse gas emissions by 30% by 2030 and to achieve net-zero emissions by 2050 via a federal carbon pricing policy. Additionally, legislation for marine protection was passed by Trudeau's parliament as well as banning six common single-use plastic products and improving evaluations of environmental impact. Despite a generally green stance, Trudeau supported oil and gas pipelines to bring Canadian fossil fuel resources to foreign markets, which was met with opposition from environmental activists.

In March 2022, the NDP agreed on a confidence and supply arrangement with the Liberal Party, including policies such as establishing a national dental care program for low-income Canadians, progress toward a national pharmacare program, labor reforms for federally regulated workers, and additional taxes on financial institutions. The NDP and the Liberal Party terminated their confidence and supply agreement in September 2024. The agreement had been in place since March 2022, however it was terminated nine months ahead of schedule. On January 6, 2025, during a political crisis, Trudeau announced he would resign as Liberal leader and prime minister by 24 March 2025 upon the election of a new party leader, attributing his decision to intraparty dissent. The Liberal Party moved further from its more progressive stances toward the center under new leadership from Mark Carney, who became the first prime minister in Canadian history never to have held elected office. Carney would lead the Liberals to a minority government in late 2025 after advising the Governor General to dissolve Parliament and trigger a federal election.

==== United States ====
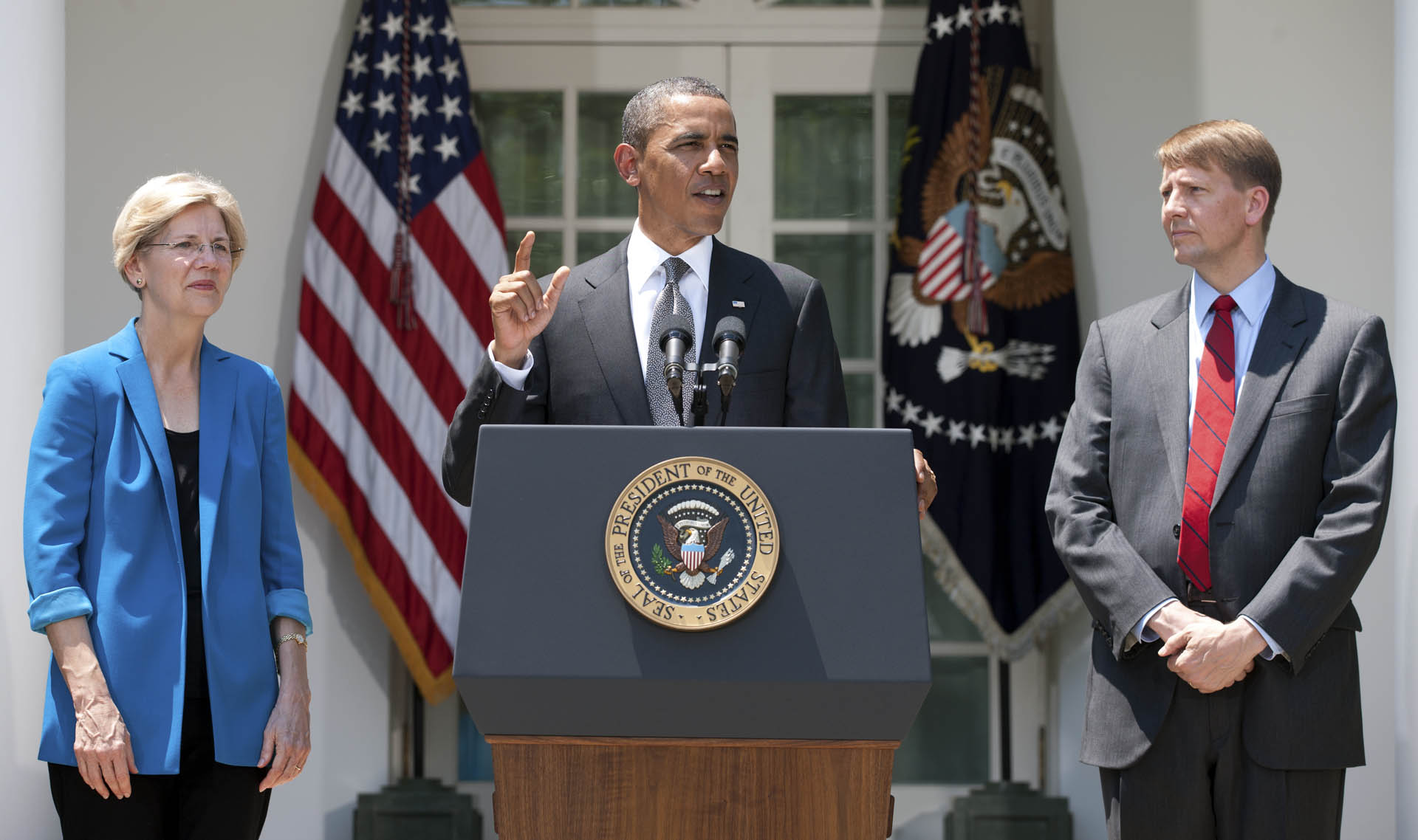
President Obama (center) nominating Richard Cordray (right) as the first director of the CFPB. Elizabeth Warren (left) conceived of the CFPB and was both its inaugural interim director and special advisor

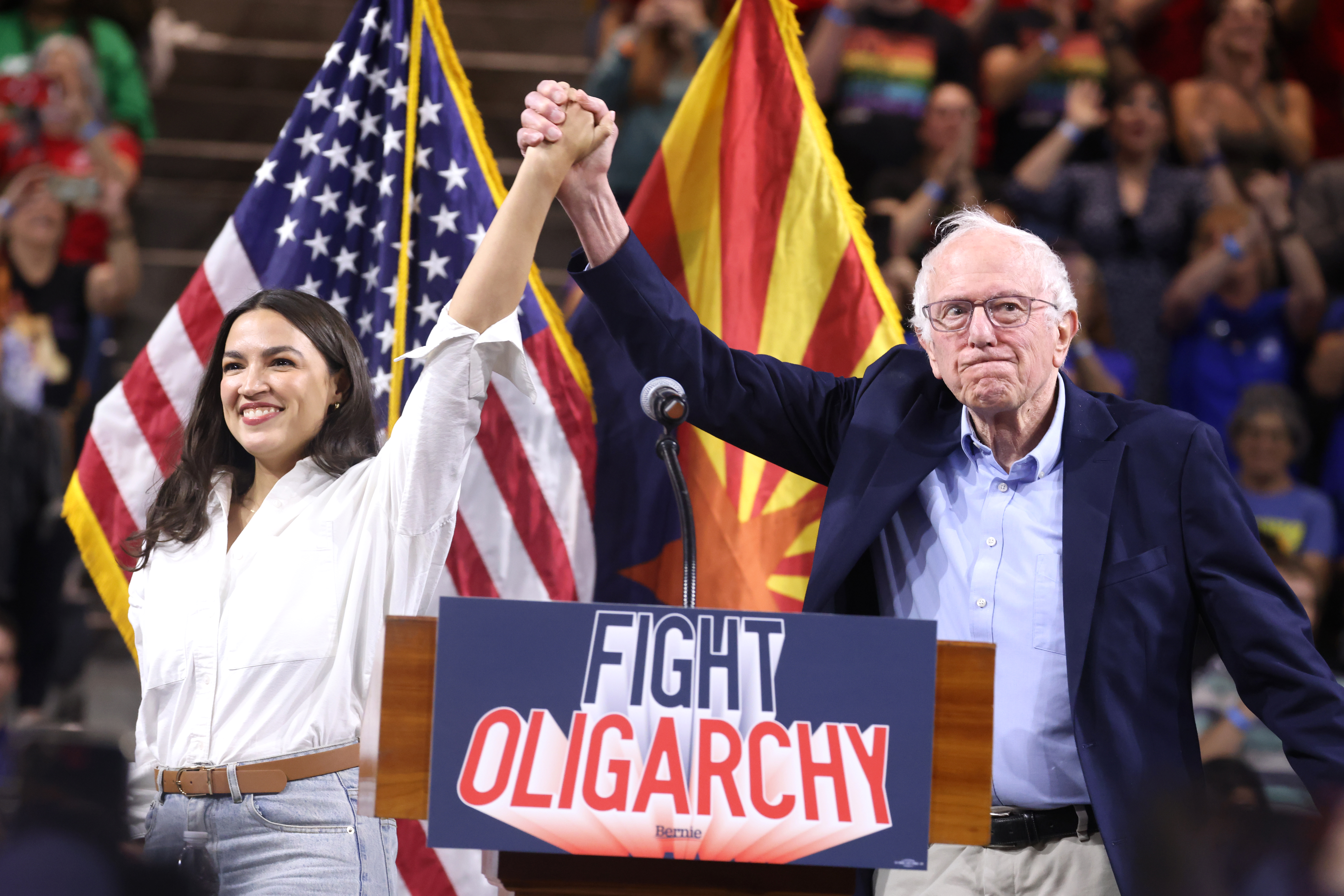
Senator Sanders and Representative Alexandria Ocasio-Cortez, democratic progressive socialists in the U.S.

In the United States, both the Progressive Era and the modern movement are rooted in the notion that free markets lead to economic inequalities that can be fixed through government action and protect the working class. In the 21st century, progressives continue to favor public policy that they theorize will reduce or lessen the harmful effects of economic inequality and additionally are focused on ending systemic discrimination such as institutional racism; to advocate for social safety nets and workers' rights; and to oppose corporate influence on the democratic process. The unifying theme is to call attention to the negative impacts of current institutions or ways of doing things and to advocate for social progress, i.e., for positive change as defined by any of several standards such as the expansion of democracy, increased egalitarianism in the form of economic and social equality as well as improved well-being of a population. Proponents of social democracy have identified themselves as promoting the progressive cause. Landmark developments in progressive governance include the Consumer Financial Protection Bureau, which was originally proposed in 2007 by Elizabeth Warren, a self-described progressive capitalist who played a key role in its institutional creation. In reaction to the 2008 financial crisis and the ensuing Great Recession, the Dodd–Frank Wall Street Reform and Consumer Protection Act, which was passed in 2010, established the Consumer Financial Protection Bureau as an independent bureau within the Federal Reserve.

U.S. Congressional Progressive Caucus PAC emblem

The Bernie Sanders 2016 presidential campaign rode a wave of left-wing populist and progressive sentiment coming out of the 2008 financial crisis and the Occupy Wall Street movement. The campaign and Sanders himself praised social democratic programs in Europe and supported workplace democracy via union democracy, worker cooperatives, and workers' management of public enterprises. This continued into his 2020 presidential campaign and the Fighting Oligarchy tour with Alexandria Ocasio Cortez, sharply critiquing neoliberal capitalism. Sanders and broader coalitions like the Congressional Progressive Caucus have called for universal, single-payer healthcare, living wage laws, reductions in military expenditure, increased corporate regulation, ending mass incarceration, and strong measures to reverse climate change. Some socialists and major socialist organizations have described Sanders as a democratic socialist, market socialist, or reformist socialist, while others have called him a reformist social democrat. Throughout the mid-2020s, progressive politics in the United States are continually moving toward left-populist economic policies, as seen in the insurgent campaigns of Zohran Mamdani (who was successfully elected the 111th mayor of New York City in 2025), and Senate candidate for Michigan Abdul El-Sayed. As a candidate and as mayor, Mamdani has called for New York City to raise the local minimum wage to $30 by 2030, implementing higher taxes on corporations and high-income earners to fund free tuition at CUNY and SUNY, universal childcare, city-owned grocery stores, and free public transit, while cutting taxes for outer-borough homeowners and reforming New York's property tax system. (Note: Attributed to multiple references:) In the 2026 United States House of Representatives elections in New York, progressive and socialist candidates received much media attention for a successful primary night, defeating more moderate Democratic incumbents in the 10th and 13th districts and winning the open 7th in what was described as a "clean sweep" for Mayor Mamdani and the Democratic Socialists of America.

== Types ==
=== Social progressivism ===
The term cultural liberalism is used in a substantially similar context to social progressivism, deriving from the concept of moral progress and viewing liberalism as central to the development of culture. Cultural progressives may be economically centrist, conservative, or progressive.

=== Economic progressivism ===
Economic progressivism—also New Progressive Economics—is a term used to distinguish it from progressivism in cultural fields. Economic progressives may draw from a variety of economic traditions, including democratic capitalism, democratic socialism, social democracy, and social liberalism. Overall, economic progressives' views are rooted in the concept of social justice and the common good, and aim to improve the human condition through government regulation, social protections and the maintenance of public goods. Some economic progressives may show conservative views on cultural issues. These movements are related to communitarian conservative movements such as Christian democracy and one-nation conservatism.

=== Techno progressivism ===
An early mention of techno-progressivism appeared in 1999 as the removal of "all political, cultural, biological, and psychological limits to self-actualization and self-realization". According to techno-progressivism, scientific and technical aspects of progress are linked to ethical and social developments in society. Therefore, according to the majority of techno-progressive viewpoints, advancements in science and technology will not be considered proper progress until and unless they are accompanied by a fair distribution of the costs, risks, and rewards of these new capabilities. Many techno-progressive critics and supporters believe that while improved democracy, increased justice, decreased violence, and a broader culture of rights are all desirable, they are insufficient on their own to address the problems of modern technological societies unless and until they are accompanied by scientific and technological advancements that uphold and apply these ideals.

== Progressive parties or parties with progressive factions ==
=== Current parties ===
- Islamic Republic of Afghanistan: Solidarity Party of Afghanistan
- Argentina: Union for the Homeland (factions)
- Australia: Australian Greens, Australia's Voice, Fusion Party, Australian Labor Party (factions)
- Barbados: United Progressive Party
- Brazil: Workers' Party, Brazilian Socialist Party (factions), Democratic Labour Party, Socialism and Liberty Party
- Canada: Liberal Party of Canada, New Democratic Party, Canadian Future Party
- Chile: Broad Front, Liberal Party of Chile
- Colombia: Humane Colombia
- Croatia: Social Democratic Party
- Czech Republic: Czech Pirate Party
- France: Radical Party of the Left, New Deal
- Germany: Volt Germany, Alliance 90/The Greens, Party of Humanists
- Greece: Syriza, Course of Freedom
- Hungary: Democratic Coalition
- Italy: Possible, Green Europe
- Indonesia: Green Party of Indonesia
- Japan: Social Democratic Party, Japanese Communist Party, Reiwa Shinsengumi, Constitutional Democratic Party of Japan
- Kosovo: Vetëvendosje
- Kuwait: Kuwaiti Progressive Movement
- Mexico: Morena, Party of the Democratic Revolution, Citizens' Movement
- Netherlands: Democrats 66, GroenLinks, PvdA
- Pakistan: Pakistan Peoples Party
- Peru: New Peru for Good Living
- Philippines: Akbayan
- Poland: Polish Initiative, New Left, Left Together, Polish Socialist Party, The Greens, Civic Platform (faction)
- Portugal: Socialist Party, Left Bloc, People Animals Nature, LIVRE, Volt Portugal
- Romania: Save Romania Union, Democracy and Solidarity Party, Volt Romania, Health Education Nature Sustainability Party
- Russia: Yabloko
- Serbia: Party of the Radical Left
- Singapore: Progress Singapore Party
- Slovakia: Progressive Slovakia
- South Korea: Justice Party, Progressive Party, Mirae Party
- Spain: Spanish Socialist Worker's Party, Más Madrid, Sumar, Republican Left of Catalonia
- Taiwan: Democratic Progressive Party, New Power Party, Taiwan People's Party (factions)
- Thailand: Thai Liberal Party, People's Party
- Turkey: Republican People's Party (factions), Peoples' Equality and Democracy Party
- United Kingdom: Green Party of England and Wales, Labour Party (factions), Liberal Democrats (factions), Scottish National Party, Plaid Cymru, Social Democratic and Labour Party, Transform
- United States: Democratic Party (factions), Working Families Party, Green Party of the United States
- Venezuela: Popular Will

=== Former parties ===
- Argentina: Front for Victory
- Australia: Reason Party
- Bhutan: Bhutan Kuen-Nyam Party
- Canada: Progressive Party of Canada
- Chile: Social Convergence
- France: Movement Party, Opportunist Republicans
- Hong Kong: Demosisto
- Iran: Society for the Progress of Iran
- Israel: Meretz
- Japan: Japan Socialist Party
- Netherlands: Free-thinking Democratic League
- New Zealand: Jim Anderton's Progressive Party
- Pakistan: Sindh National Front
- Poland: Spring, Your Movement
- Romania: Romanian Social Party, National Union for the Progress of Romania
- South Korea: Progressive Party (1956), Democratic Labor Party, New Progressive Party, Unified Progressive Party
- Spain: Unidas Podemos
- Thailand: Move Forward Party
- United States: Progressive Party (1912), Progressive Party (1924), National Progressives of America/(Wisconsin), Progressive Party (1948)

== See also ==
- Affirmative action
- Democracy
  - Democratic socialism
- Economic progressivism
- Egalitarianism
- Left-wing politics
  - Green politics
  - Left-libertarianism
  - Left-wing nationalism
  - Left-wing populism
  - Liberal socialism
- Liberalism
  - Modern liberalism in the United States
- Managerial state
- Progressive Era
  - Progressive conservatism
  - Progressive Party
  - Progressive tax
- Radicalism (historical)
- Reformist party (Japan)
- Revisionism (Marxism)
- Secularism
  - Secular liberalism
- Transhumanism
  - New eugenics
  - Techno-progressivism
  - Transhumanist politics
