= Youth Association of Kuwait =

Kuwaiti youth organization

- رابطة الشباب الكويتي
- Abbreviation: yakuwait
- Formation: 2009
- Type: Youth Organization
- Headquarters: Khaldiya, Kuwait
- Affiliations: Women's Cultural and Social Society
- Website: http://www.yakuwait.org

The Youth Association of Kuwait (Arabic: رابطة الشباب الكويتي) is the mainstream leftist youth organization in Kuwait which was founded in 2006 under the name National Democratic Youth Association. It aims to build a new generation of Kuwaitis that are interested in community service and help youth achieve their goals. Also, the association is interested in youth issues such as education, unemployment and youth activism.

== History ==
Members within the Kuwait Democratic Forum (Arabic: المنبر الديمقراطي الكويتي) established the National Democratic Youth Association (Arabic: رابطة الشباب الوطني الديمقراطي) as its youth wing in 2006 to focus on cultural and societal issues facing young people in Kuwait.

=== Declaration of Establishment ===
The Declaration of Establishment for the organization came in May 10, 2006 and was published in Al Taleea Newspaper, the mouthpiece of Kuwait Democratic Forum, and it was announced that the first board was composed of Ali Hussain Al-Awadhi as President, Shurouq Al Shammari as Secretary, Ahmed Abdulrahim as Treasurer, Mohammed Al Hassan as Head of Communication, and Jassim Al Enezi as Head of Events and Activities.

The declaration stated its organizational goals which were that it aimed to increase cultural awareness and build young people's intellectual capacity, spread democratic values, tolerance and multiculturalism, tackle divisive rhetoric, defend public liberties and citizen rights, and spread constitutional awareness.

In 2009, the association held its first convention and elected an administrative body and approved its bylaws. After that it kick started its activities with a rigorous social agenda defending the freedom of thought by organizing a campaign and meeting members of parliament regarding the problem of unemployment and hidden unemployment with the help of the Graduates' Society and the Women's Cultural and Social Society. Also, the association worked hand-in-hand with other groups tackling human rights and other issues.

After its second convention in 2011, the majority of members voted on changing the name of the organization to its current one and adopting social democracy as its ideology along with the Masaruna document. The second convention elected Ahmed Soud (president), Mohammad Alhasan (vice-president), Ahmed Abdulraheem (secretary), Abdulwahab Alnajdi and Abdulghaphor Asirri.

=== Kuwait Civil Alliance ===
Along with five other non-governmental organizations, Kuwait Civil Alliance was established in 14 January 2014 to issue a Universal Periodic Report to be presented at the United Nations Human Rights Council.

In early 2014, the association organized its third convention at the Women's Cultural and Social Society, appointing Abdulwahab Alnajdi as president of the executive board, Ebrahim Awadh as vice president, Ali Alsalem as secretary and Abdulghaphor Hajjieh as treasurer.

On September 17, 2015, it gained recognition by the Kuwaiti Government and became an officially registered organization with the Ministry of Social Affairs and Labour.

== Organizational structure ==
The highest authority in the association is its convention which is held every two years. The convention elects an executive board which creates committees and appoints members with special tasks and runs the day-to-day affairs of the association. The current executive board is made of Abdulwahab Alnajdi as chairman, Ebrahim Awadh as deputy chairman, Ali Alsalem as secretary and Abdulghaphor Asirri as treasurer.

== Local issues ==
The association is very active in promoting its agenda, organizing grassroots campaigns and seminars to do so.

=== Nabeeha 5 ===
While most organizations with political alignments backed the Nabeeha 5 electoral remapping campaign in 2006, the association opposed it because it saw it as an unfair redistribution that would marginalize sects of society.

=== Mass Privatization ===
In 2010, the association, along with the Union of Petroleum Workers and other civil societies, spearheaded a campaign against the government's then proposed privatization plan. It claimed that the plan would effectively destroy the middle and working classes of Kuwait in the long run, describing it as unconstitutional.

=== Freedom of education ===
The association advocates that it is the right of every higher-education student to have the choice to choose between a co-educated environment and a segregated one, and it does not endorse co-ed itself.

=== 2011 Friday protests ===
One of the main events on the political arena in Kuwait in 2011 was the Friday Protests which were spearheaded by Islamist and tribe-backed MPs, in addition to some youth groups. The association did not participate nor endorse the protests because it saw that a lot of corrupt figures were involved in it, nevertheless the association does not deny that it is the right of every Kuwaiti to politically assemble.

=== 2011 MP Bribery Allegations ===
A newspaper claimed that some MPs might have gained up to 25 Million Kuwaiti Dinars and they are kept in their bank accounts. The association gave a statement to the press demanding that the legislative body should pass information transparency laws and a law for asset disclosure regarding people in leadership positions in the executive, legislative and judicial bodies.

== Location ==
Currently, the organization's headquarters is located in the Woman's Cultural and Social Society in Khaldiya, Block 2, Salem bin Ali Bougamaz Street.

== Leadership ==
=== 2006–2009 ===
- Ali Hussain Al-Awadhi, President
- Shurouq Al Shammari, Secretary

=== 2009–2011 ===
- Ahmed Soud, President
- Mohammed Al Hassan, Secretary

=== 2011–2013 ===
- Ahmed Soud, President
- Mohammed Al Hassan, Vice President

=== 2013–2014 ===
- Abdulwahab Al Najdi, President
- Ebrahim Awadh, Vice President
- Abdulghaphor Hajjieh, Representative in Kuwait Civil Alliance

=== 2014–2016 ===
- Abdulwahab Al Najdi, President
- Bebe Al Khashti, Vice President

=== 2016–2018 ===
- Bebe Al Khashti, President
- Abdulghaphor Hajjieh, Vice President

=== 2018–2022 ===
- Falah Al Khaldi, President
- Raed Al Tamimi, Vice President
