= Ali Hussain Al-Awadhi =

Kuwaiti political activist

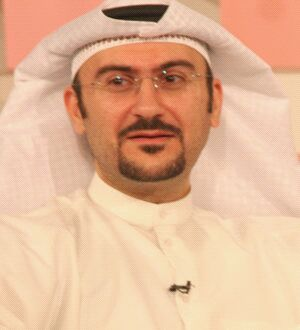
- Born: 2 May 1974 (age 50); Sulaibikhat, Kuwait
- Occupation: Political activist
- Website: alialawadhi.com

Ali Hussain Al-Awadhi (Arabic: علي حسين العوضي, born 2 May 1974) is a journalist, former student leader and politician from Kuwait. He is the first chairman of the Youth Association of Kuwait (then National Democratic Youth Association) and a founding member of the Democratic Ticket, a student group which runs for elections at Kuwait University – College of Science's student society. He is best known for being the editor-in-chief of Kuwaiti progressive weekly newspaper Al-Taleaa which is loosely linked to the Kuwait Democratic Forum (Arabic: المنبر الديمقراطي الكويتي).

== Early life and education ==
Al-Awadhi was born in Sulaibikhat where he attended Al-Awza'ai high school in 1988 and graduated in 1992. His father Hussain Al-Awadhi was employed in the Ministry of Communication for the Kuwaiti government and is of Persian ancestry. His parents are 3rd generation Kuwaitis.

In 1992, he was accepted in Kuwait University to study biology where he started his student activism. After a year in college he joined the ranks of leftist Democratic Circle Ticket to "change Kuwait to the better" but after some time he splintered with a group of students to form the Democratic Ticket because he and other students wanted less control from Kuwait Democratic Forum at that time which Democratic Circle was.

== Professional career ==
In 1996, he started working for Al-Seyessah Newspaper as an editor covering student affairs in Kuwait University and the Public Authority for Applied Education and Training until 1999. In 2005, he started working for Al-Taleea Newspaper getting promoted till he was appointed as editor-in-chief in 2010 by the board of directors of the newspaper.

== Political career ==
While most national democrats in Kuwait tend to work independently, Al-Awadhi wanted to work in organized politics. Thus, he joined the Kuwait Democratic Forum in 2005. He rose in the ranks of that political organization to be elected as a board member in 2007 and in 2009. Nevertheless, he was appointed for the political committee in 2012.

Also, he volunteered in 2008 for Mohammed Al-Abduljader's media committee for his election campaign for parliament. Then he volunteered for Abdullah Al-Nibari's voter reach committee for and Mohammed Al-Abduljader's media committee in 2009's parliamentary elections. Finally, in 2012 he headed the media committee in Mohammed Al-Abduljader's election campaign.
