= Kuwaiti Progressive Movement =

Kuwaiti political organization

Kuwaiti Progressive Movement الحركة التقدمية الكويتية
- Leader: Osamah Alabdulrahim
- Founded: 14 March 2011; 15 years ago
- Split from: Kuwait Democratic Forum
- Headquarters: Al Andalus, Kuwait
- Ideology: Socialism; Anti-capitalism; Anti-imperialism; Marxism-Leninism
- Political position: Left-wing to far-left
- International affiliation: IMCWP

Website
- taqadomi.com

The Kuwaiti Progressive Movement (Arabic: الحركة التقدمية الكويتية) is a far-left political organization in Kuwait established in 2011.

== Establishment ==
The Movement was established in 2011 as Kuwait Progressive Bloc (Arabic: التيار التقدمي الكويتي) after the People's Union Party (Arabic: حزب اتحاد الشعب) faction, led by Ahmad Deyain, split from Kuwait Democratic Forum on the basis that the latter was taken over by a neo-liberal faction. In its establishment proclamation, it states that it's the continuation of the People's Union Party that was established in 1975 which participated in the Forum's establishment in 1991.

=== Background ===
With the increasing visibility of socialism in the 1970s following the Vietnam War, the Ethiopian Civil War, the election of Salvador Allende in Chile, and the success of other national liberation movements such as the MPLA in Angola and the NLF in South Yemen (as well as others in the prior decade), leftists in Kuwait originally had to operate secretly due to restrictions put in place by the Emir until the end of the Gulf War.

== Leadership ==
Its current Secretary-General is Osamah Alabdulrahim, and its candidate for the 2022 Kuwait National Assembly elections was Dr. Hamad Alansari.
