= Abdulwahab Al-Rushaid =

- عبدالوهاب الرشيد
- Born: October 29, 1984 (age 41) Kuwait
- Citizenship: Kuwait
- Education: Master of Business Administration MBA, Bachelor of Business Administration in Finance. Gulf University for Science and Technology, Kuwait University.
- Occupations: Economist, politician.
- Organization: Kuwait Economic Society.
- Known for: Vice-Chairman of Kuwait Economic Society.
- Board member of: Kuwait Economic Society.

Abdulwahab Al-Rushaid (Arabic: عبدالوهاب الرشيد) (born Abdulwahab Moh'd Al-Rushaid, October 29, 1984) is a Kuwaiti economist and politician. He is an elected board member of Kuwait Economic Society and the vice-chairman of the board.

He has been Minister of Finance and Minister of State for Economics Affairs and Investments from 28 of December 2021 to April 2023. As finance minister, he headed the Kuwait Investment Authority, which manages the country’s $700 billion sovereign wealth fund, designed to reduce dependence on oil-related investments. In October 2022, he was appointed for a second term as Minister of Finance and Minister of State for Economic Affairs and Investments.

== Kuwaiti general election 2016 ==
Al-Rushaid was a candidate in the Kuwaiti General Election 2016 and ranked at the 22nd place in the third constituency by 1,345 votes.
