= Mohammed Al-Abduljader =

Kuwaiti politician

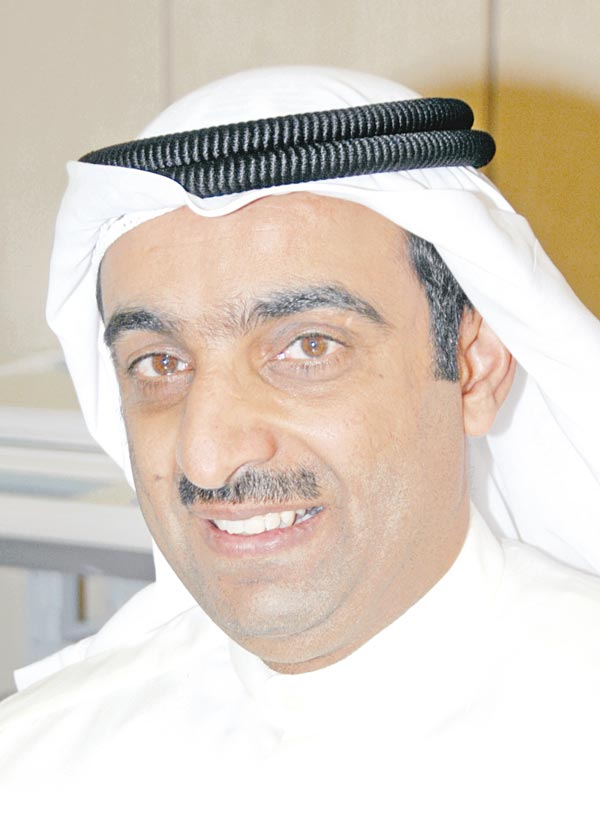
Mohammed Al-Abduljader

Dr. Mohammed Abdullah Al-Abduljader is a former member of parliament in the Kuwaiti National Assembly representing the second district. Al-Abduljader was the deputy secretary general of the Kuwait Democratic Foundation; a progressive, liberal Kuwaiti political organization that is a strong advocate of civil liberties, and of political and economic reform.

Born in 1964, Al-Abduljader studied geopolitics and worked in the Ministry of Finance before being elected to the National Assembly in 2008.

In 2008, Al-Abduljader ran for office under the banner of the liberal National Democratic Alliance; an umbrella coalition of different liberal political figures and groups, including the Kuwait Democratic Forum. He won in 10th place.
