= Abdullah Al-Nibari =

Kuwaiti politician (1936–2022)

Member of the National Assembly of Kuwait
- In office 1992–1999
- In office 1971–1976

Personal details
- Born: 22 March 1936 Kuwait City, Kuwait
- Died: 20 March 2022 (aged 85) Kuwait City, Kuwait
- Party: KDF
- Education: The American University in Cairo; University of Oxford

Abdullah Al-Nibari (Arabic: عبد الله النيباري; 22 March 1936 – 20 March 2022) was a Kuwaiti politician. A member of the Kuwait Democratic Forum, he served in the National Assembly from 1971 to 1976 and again from 1992 to 1999. He died in Kuwait City on 20 March 2022 at the age of 85.
