= Kuwait Democratic Forum =

Kuwaiti political organization

Kuwait Democratic Forum المنبر الديمقراطي الكويتي
- Abbreviation: KDF
- General Secretary: Abdulhadi Al Senafi
- Founded: 2 March 1991
- Headquarters: Kuwait City
- Youth wing: Youth Association of Kuwait
- Ideology: Secularism; Arab nationalism
- Political position: Centre-left

Website
- https://alminbarkw.org

The Kuwait Democratic Forum (Arabic: المنبر الديمقراطي الكويتي) is a centre-left political organization founded in 1991. Members include Ahmad Al-Khatib, Abdullah Al-Naibari, and Saleh Al-Mulla .

== Establishment ==
After the liberation of Kuwait in 1991, the Forum issued a proclamation stating the establishment of it as an issues-based organization. It was effectively a coalition where secular, leftist, and centrist organizations worked under the umbrella of the Forum, in addition to some independent politicians.

== Ideology ==
The Kuwait Democratic Forum is an Arab nationalist and Pan-Arabist organization, which pursues a secular government. It claims to be working towards achieving full democracy and instilling respect for human rights and freedoms. It advocates for women's political rights, electoral districting reform, and the decoupling of the Office of the Crown Prince and the Office of Prime Minister. KDF is currently advocating:

1. the reform of the electoral districting statute;
2. the repeal of all freedom-constricting laws;
3. the enactment of a pardoning bill for all political detainees in Kuwait;
4. the amendment of the citizenship statute to enable judicial review over executive citizenship-stripping decisions;
5. the call for a national convention addressing pertinent issues in Kuwait including economic, societal and political issues; and
6. an elected government.

== Organizational structure ==
The Forum has a biennial assembly that elections the General Secretary, the Central Committee, and the organizational whip. The General Secretary appoints the secretariat that governs the organization's day-to-day operations. The Central Committee, composed of elected members and the General Secretary, develops strategies and tactics.

=== Current leadership ===
The organization's leadership for the 2022 to 2025 cycle is:

- Abdulhadi Al-Senafi, General Secretary
- Meshari Al Ibrahim, Deputy General Secretary
- Mishal Al Wazzan, Secretary
- Abdulaziz Al Tawash, Treasurer
- Mohammed Al Hashemi
- Fawaz Al Rukhaimi
- Isra'a Al Ameri
- Ali Bushehri
- Mohammed Al Awadhi
- Talal Al Sarraf.

The Chairperson of the Central Committee is Bandar Al Khairan.

=== Former general secretaries ===
- Ali Hussain Al-Awadhi, author and businessperson
- Bandar Al Khairan, labor movement activist
- Yousuf Al Shaiji, businessperson
- Amer Al Tamimi, economist and former chairperson of Kuwait Economic Society
- Abdullah Al-Nibari, economist and Member of Parliament
- Sami Almunayis, journalist and Member of Parliament
- Ahmad Aldeyain, journalist and teacher
