= Beaumarchais (disambiguation) =

Pierre-Augustin de Beaumarchais (1732–1799) was a French playwright, diplomat and polymath.

Beaumarchais may also refer to:

== People ==
- Jacques Delarüe-Caron de Beaumarchais, French diplomat
- Jean-Pierre de Beaumarchais, French bibliographer
- Eustache de Beaumarchais, French baron and military leader

== Other uses ==
- Boulevard Beaumarchais, a boulevard of the 3rd, 4th and 11th arrondissement of Paris
- Beaumarchais (radio show), BBC Radio 4 programme
