= Embassy of France, London =

French diplomatic mission to the United Kingdom

Embassy of France in London
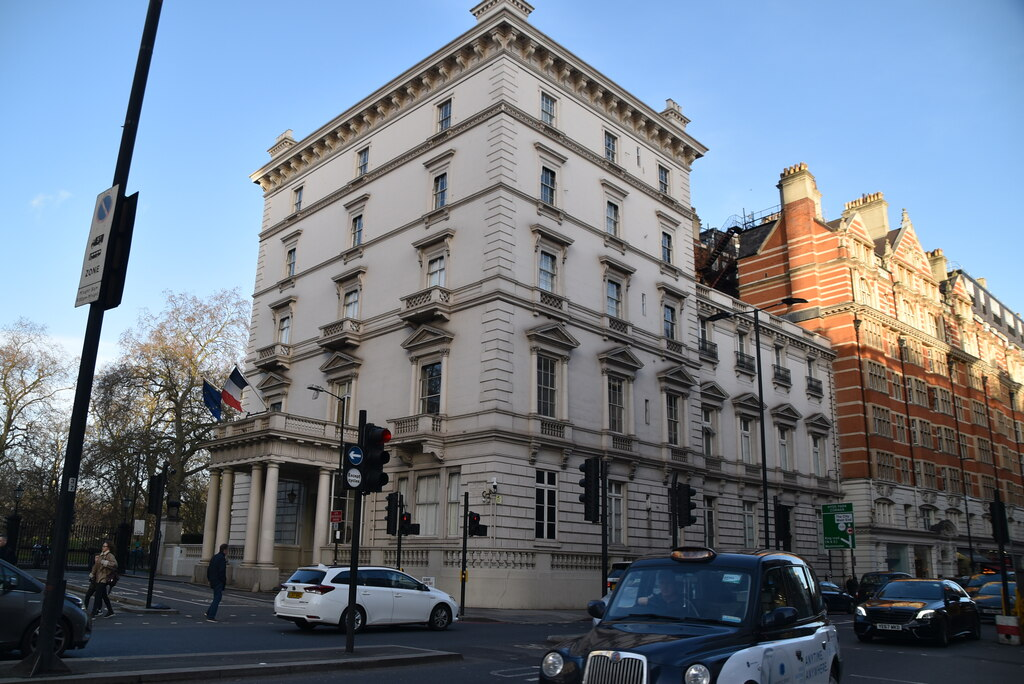
- Location: Knightsbridge, London
- Address: 58 Knightsbridge, London SW1X 7JT
- Coordinates: 51.5025°N 0.1581°W
- Ambassador: Hélène Tréheux-Duchêne
- Jurisdiction: United Kingdom
- Website: Official website

The Embassy of France in London is the diplomatic mission of France to the United Kingdom.

== Current building ==
Located just off Knightsbridge at Albert Gate, one of the entrances to Hyde Park, it is situated immediately opposite the Embassy of Kuwait. This building, along with the rest of Albert Gate and neighbouring buildings, were designed by the British architect Thomas Cubitt; his son, George Cubitt, who was created Baron Ashcombe in 1892, is Queen Camilla's great-great-grandfather.

At the time of these buildings' construction in the 1840s, they were by far the tallest structures in the Knightsbridge area.

Previously, the Embassy was housed at Derby House, 23/26 Grosvenor Square.

== Secondary locations ==
France also owns various premises along the Cromwell Road, South Kensington which house its Consular, Cultural, Science & Technology and Visa sections. It also has a Trade mission at 28-29 Haymarket and a Paymaster & Financial Comptroller section at 30 Queen's Gate Terrace, South Kensington, while No. 11 Kensington Palace Gardens has been the French Ambassador's official residence since 1944.

== Gallery ==
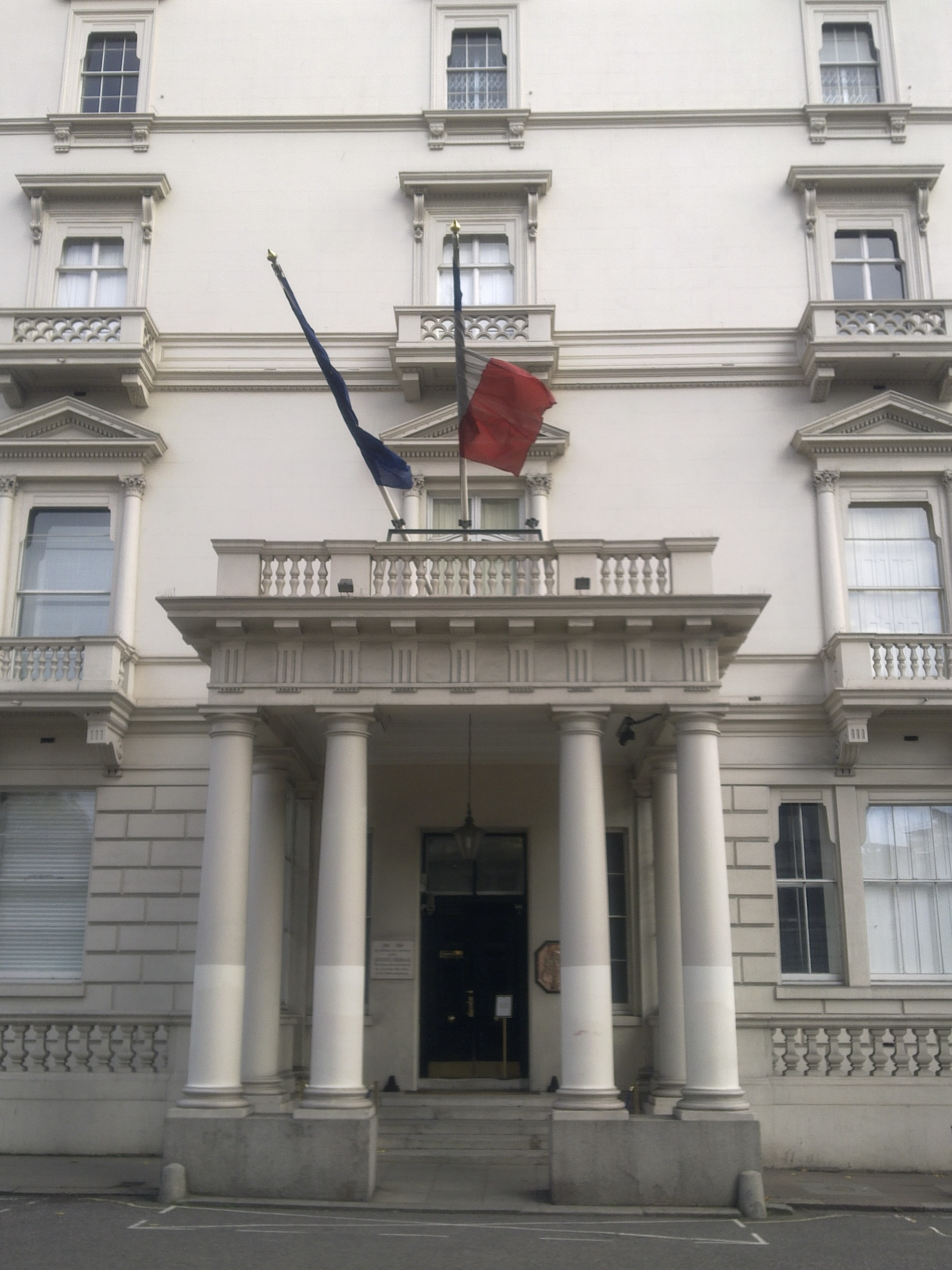
French Embassy in Knightsbridge

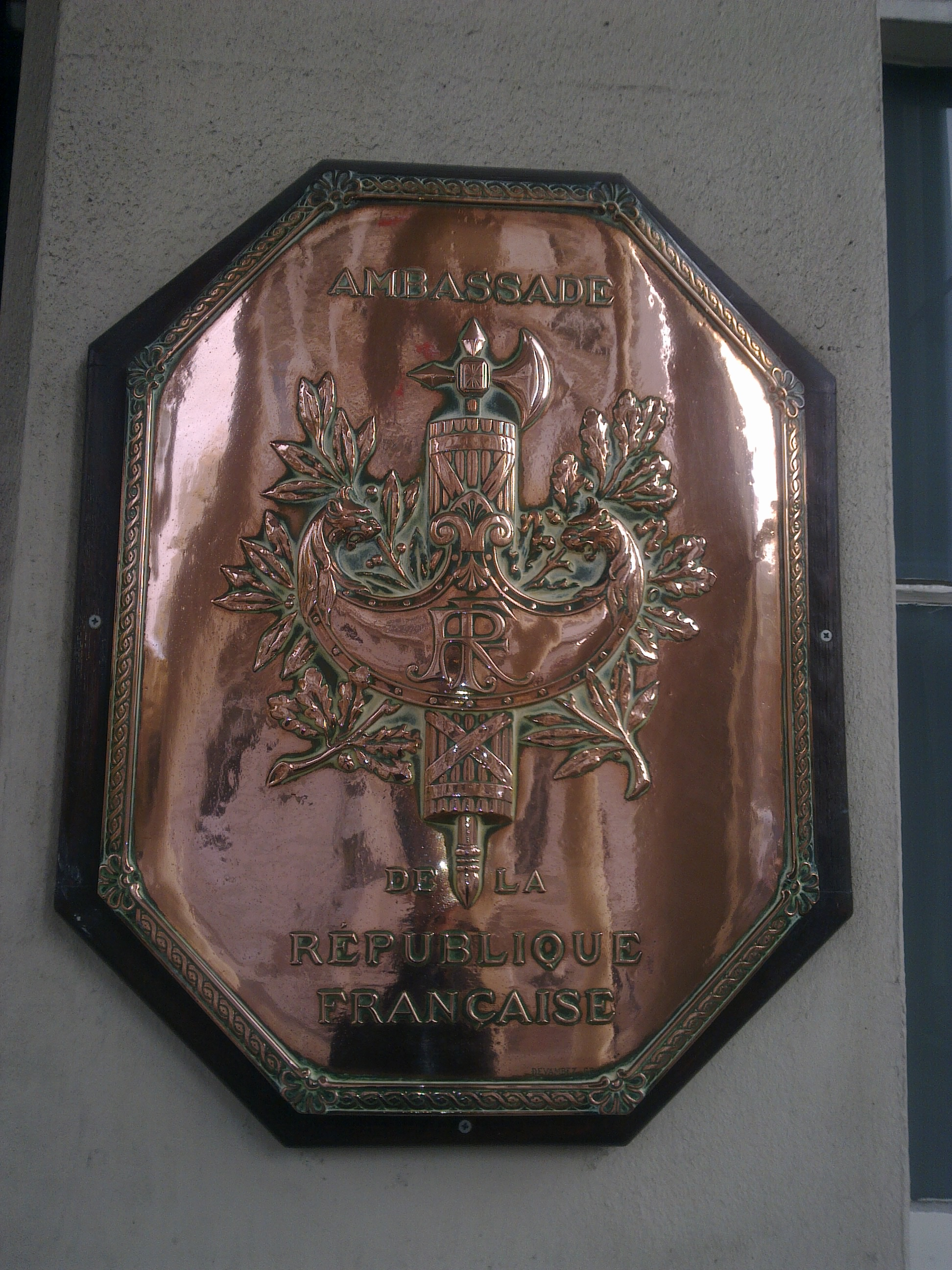
French national emblem plaque outside the Embassy

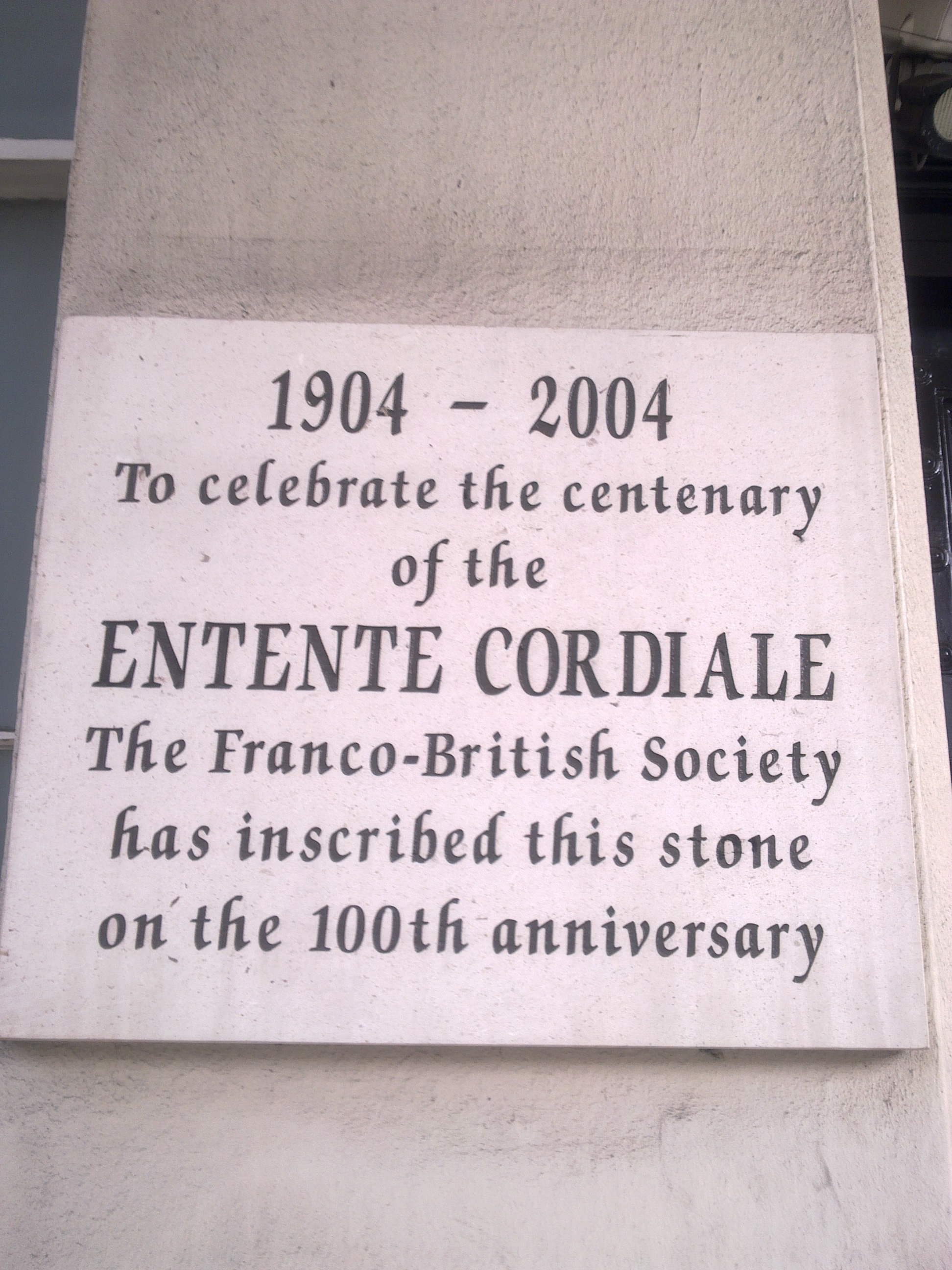
Entente Cordiale centenary plaque outside the Embassy

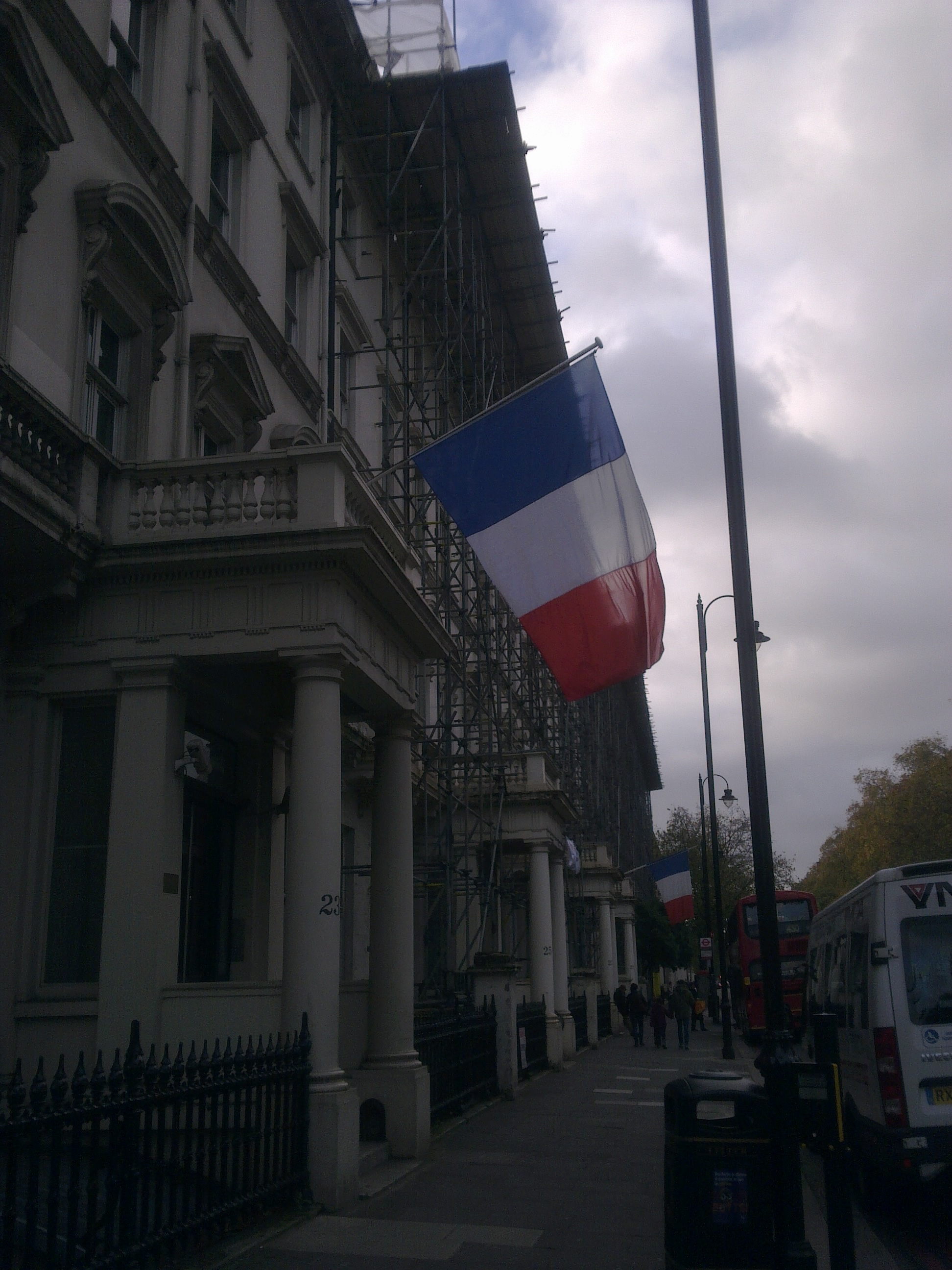
The French Consulate on the Cromwell Road

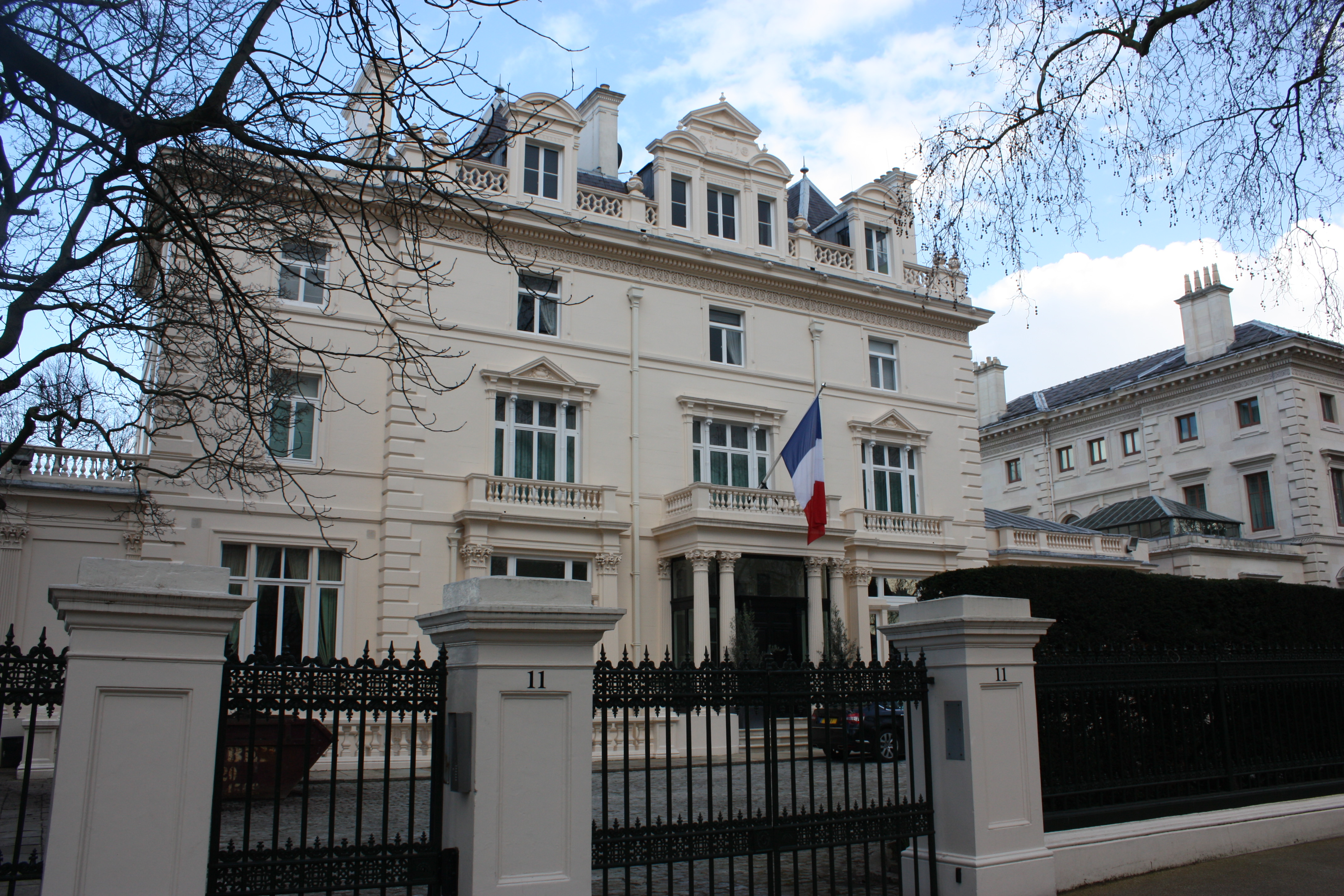
Residence of the French Ambassador to the UK

== See also ==
- France–United Kingdom relations
- List of Ambassadors of France to the United Kingdom
- Embassy of the United Kingdom, Paris
