= List of ambassadors of France to the United Kingdom =

Ambassador of France to the United Kingdom
- Ambassadeur de France au Royaume-Uni

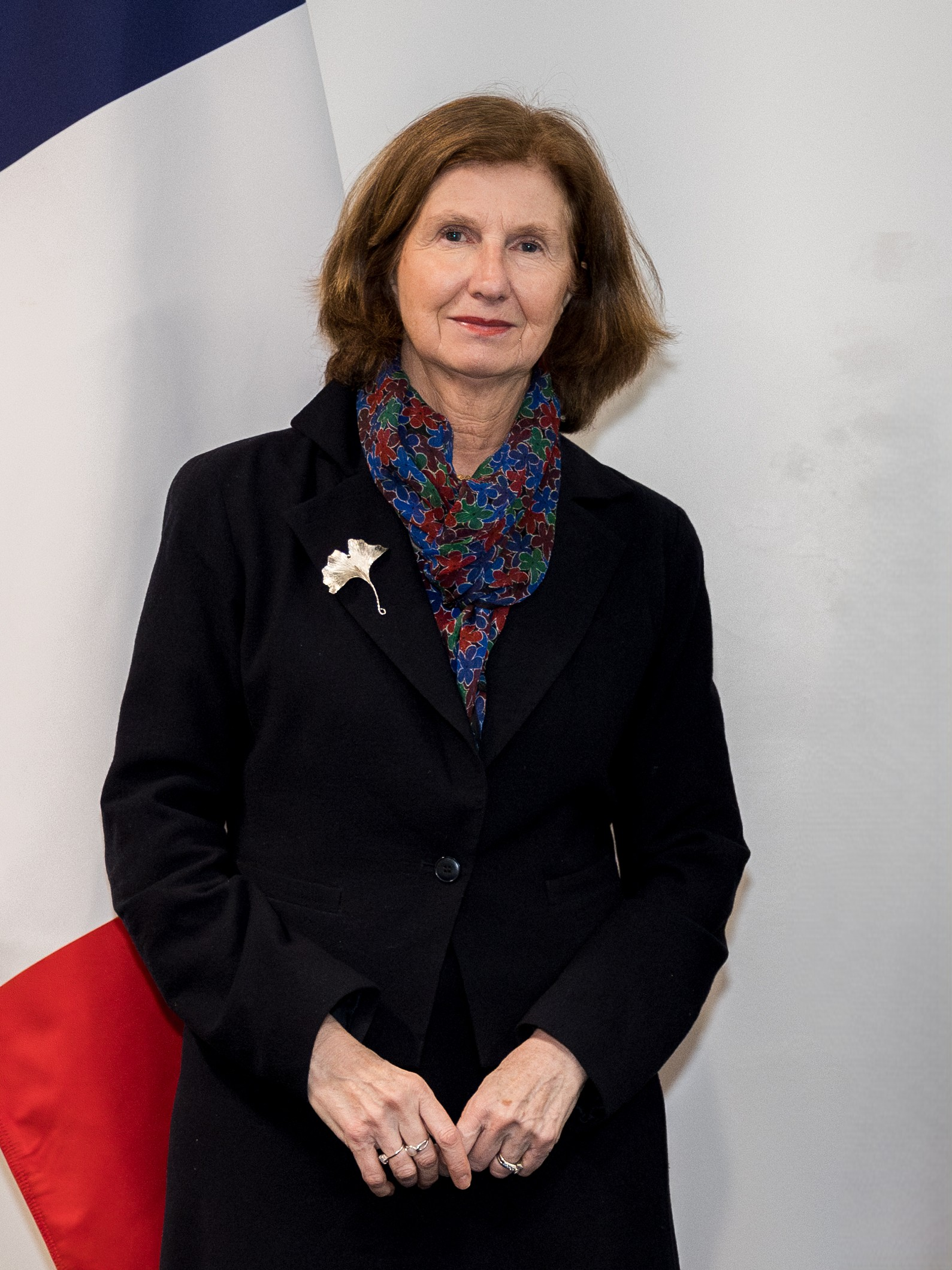
- Incumbent; Hélène Tréheux-Duchêne since 9 February 2023
- Style: Ambassador Extraordinary and Plenipotentiary
- Residence: 11 Kensington Palace Gardens

This is the list of ambassadors of France to the United Kingdom, operating from the Embassy of France, London. The current officeholder is Hélène Tréheux-Duchêne who was appointed on 12 October 2022. She presented her credentials to King Charles III on 9 February 2023.

== Embassy of France, London ==
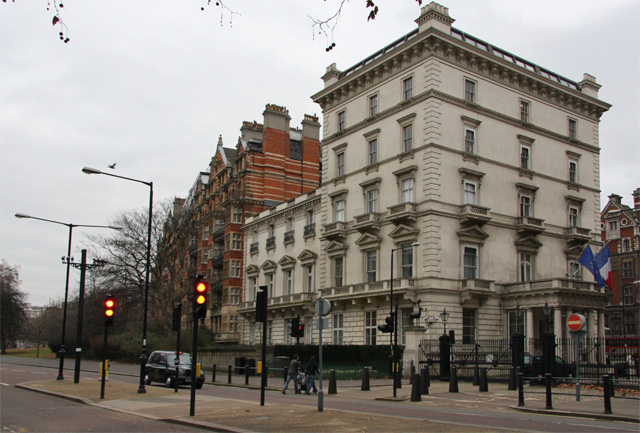
The Embassy of France, London

The embassy of France in London is located just off Knightsbridge at Albert Gate, one of the entrances to Hyde Park, directly opposite the Embassy of Kuwait. The building was designed by the British architect Thomas Cubitt. At the time of its construction in the 1840s, it was among the tallest structures in the Knightsbridge area.

France also owns various premises along the Cromwell Road, South Kensington which house its Consular, Cultural, Science & Technology and Visa sections. It also has a Trade mission at 28-29 Haymarket and a Paymaster & Financial Comptroller section at 30 Queen's Gate Terrace, South Kensington, while No. 11 Kensington Palace Gardens has been the French Ambassador's official residence since 1944.

== French Ambassadors ==
=== French Ambassadors to the United Kingdom (1801–present) ===
Imperial French Arms

Heraldic emblem of the French Republic

Image	From	Until	Ambassadors
	1801	1802	Louis-Guillaume Otto (Chargé d'affaires)
	1803	1804	Antoine-François Andréossy
Napoleonic Wars (1803–1814)
	1814	1815	Louis, duc de La Chastre
	1815	1819	René-Eustache, marquis d'Osmond
	1819	1819	Victor de Fay de La Tour-Maubourg
	1820	1821	Élie, duc Decazes
	1821	1821	Antoine Louis Marie de Gramont, 8th Duke of Gramont
	1822	1823	François-René de Chateaubriand
	1823	1828	Jules de Polignac
	1828	1830	Anne-Adrien-Pierre de Montmorency-Laval
	1830	1834	Charles Maurice de Talleyrand-Périgord
	1830	1832	Charles Joseph (First Secretary, on behalf of Talleyrand)
	1835	1840	Horace Sébastiani
	1840	1840	François Guizot
	1841	1847	Louis de Beaupoil de Saint-Aulaire
	1847	1848	Victor de Broglie (1785–1870)
	1848	1848	Gustave de Beaumont
	1848	1851	Édouard Drouyn de Lhuys
	1851	1855	Alexandre Colonna-Walewski
	1855	1858	Victor de Persigny
	1858	1859	Aimable Pélissier
	1859	1860	Jean-Gilbert-Victor Fialin, duc de Persigny
	1860	1862	Charles-Joseph, comte de Flahaut
	1862	1863	Jean-Baptiste-Louis, baron Gros
	1863	1869	Henri, prince de La Tour d'Auvergne
	1869	1870	Charles, marquis de La Valette
	1871	1872	Philippe-Ferdinand-Auguste de Rohan-Chabot, comte de Jarnac
	1872	1873	Albert, duc de Broglie
	1873	1873	Louis-Charles-Élie-Amanieu, duc Decazes & de Glücksbierg
	1873	1874	Sosthène, vicomte de La Rochefoucauld later duc de Doudeauville
	1875	1879	Georges, marquis d'Harcourt
	1879	1880	Amiral Louis-Pierre-Alexis de Pothuau
	1880	1880	Ministre Léon Say
	1880	1882	Sénateur Paul-Armand Challemel-Lacour
	1883	1893	Dr. William Henry Waddington (Prime Minister of France, 1879)
	1894	1898	Alphonse Chodron, baron de Courcel
	1898	1920	Paul Cambon
	1920	1924	Auguste-Félix-Charles de Beaupoil, comte de Saint-Aulaire
	1924	1933	Aimé-Benjamin de Fleuriau, comte de Bellevue
	1933	1940	Charles Corbin
World War II (1940–1944)
	1944	1955	René Massigli
	1955	1962	Chevalier Jean Chauvel
	1962	1972	Geoffroy Chodron, baron de Courcel
	1972	1977	Jacques Delarüe-Caron de Beaumarchais
	1977	1981	Jean Sauvagnargues
	1981	1984	Emmanuel Jacquin de Margerie
	1984	1986	Jacques Viot
	1986	1990	Luc, vicomte de La Barre de Nanteuil
	1990	1993	Bernard Dorin
	1993	1998	Jean Guéguinou
	1998	2002	Daniel Bernard
	2002	2007	Gérard Errera
	2007	2011	Maurice Gourdault-Montagne
	2011	2014	Bernard Émié
	2014	2017	Sylvie Bermann
	2017	2019	Jean-Pierre Jouyet
	2019	2022	Catherine Colonna
	2022	Present	Hélène Tréheux-Duchêne

== See also ==
- French Embassy in London
- List of ambassadors of France to the Kingdom of Great Britain
- List of ambassadors of France to England
