= Georges, marquis d'Harcourt =

Harcourt arms

Georges-Trevor-Douglas-Bernard d'Harcourt-Olonde (4 November 1808 – 30 November 1883) was a French aristocrat and a 19th-century diplomat. Formally styled marquis d'Harcourt, he served as French Ambassador to London from 1875 until 1879.

== Family ==
Of Anglo-Norman descent, he was the second son of Amédée Louis André Marie Charles François, marquis d'Harcourt (1771–1831) by his wife Elizabeth Harcourt (1771–1846), of Pendley Manor, Hertfordshire.

On 5 August 1841, he married Jeanne-Paule de Beaupoil (1817–1893), daughter of Louis-Clair, comte de Sainte-Aulaire and Louise Charlotte Victoire, daughter of Nicolas de Grimoard de Beauvoir du Roure de Beaumont, comte de Brison. They had seven children:

- Bernard Pierre Louis (1842–1914), marquis d'Harcourt and baron d'Olonde, etc.
- Louis-Emmanuel, (1844–1928), Mayor of Souppes
- Victor Amédée Constant (1848–1935), Colonel of the 168th Infantry Regiment
- Louis Marie Georges (1856–1946), Major in the French Cavalry
- Pauline d'Harcourt-Olonde (1846–1922), comtesse d'Haussonville
- Aline d'Harcourt-Olonde (1852–1943)
- Catherine d'Harcourt-Olonde (1859–1944), comtesse de Puymaigre

His elder brother William marquis d'Harcourt-Olonde married, in 1837, Elizabeth Georgiana Cavendish, daughter of General The Hon. Henry Cavendish MP, while his sister, Marie-Augusta, became Duchess of Castries, wife of Charles de La Croix, duc de Castries.

== Honours ==
- - Officer, Légion d'honneur
- - Knight of Malta

== See also ==
- Earl Harcourt
- Yonne
