= Eustache de Beaumarchais =

French baron and military leader

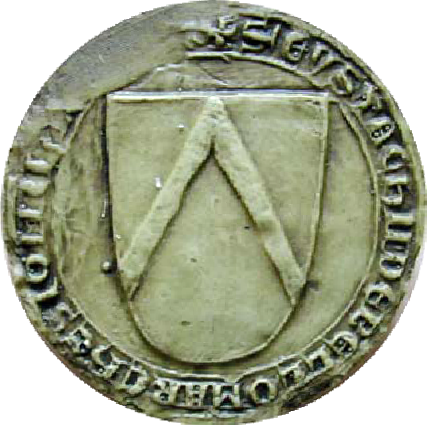
Eustache's seal

Eustache de Beaumarchais (Note: His surname may also be written Beaumarché, Beaumarchès or Beau Marchand, from the Latin Bello Marchesio.) (French pronunciation: [østaʃ də bomaʁʃɛ]; c. 1235 – 23 August 1294) was a French baron and military leader who served as seneschal of the County of Poitou (1268–76) and the County of Toulouse (1272–94). He took part in the War of the Navarrería in 1276–77 and in the Aragonese Crusade in 1284–85.

Eustache was probably born in the hamlet of Beaumarchais, now part of Othis, into a family of the petty nobility. He first entered royal service as guardian of the abbey of Aurillac. In 1257, Count Alphonse of Poitiers appointed him bailiff of the royal part of the Auvergne, (Note: The Auvergne was at that time divided between the county of Auvergne, the dauphinate of Auvergne, the episcopal county of Clermont (i.e., the bishopric) and the royal land (terra), which in 1360 became the duchy of Auvergne.) which Alphonse held as an appanage. Eustache continued as bailiff down to 1266, when he was succeeded by Geoffroy de Montirel. In 1268, Alphonse, who was also Count of Toulouse, named him his seneschal in Poitou. Alphonse died in 1271 and his counties escheated to the crown, but Eustache continued in the seneschalate of Poitou until 1276.

In 1272, Eustache was appointed royal seneschal in Toulouse, a post he held until his death. It was in his capacity as seneschal of Toulouse that he was sent with an army to Navarre in 1276, to put an end to the civic unrest and stave off invasion by Aragon and Castile. The French crown had an interest in Navarre, since the heir to the French throne, Philip, was betrothed to the Navarrese queen, Joan I. In 1279, Eustache and Imbert de Beaujeu were appointed joint military commanders in Languedoc, a position they held until 1282. In 1283, the king ordered Eustache to make an examination of the Coutumes de Toulouse, the customary law of Toulouse. In 1286 he ordered the Toulousains to swear an oath to uphold the Coutumes.

In 1280, Eustache became one of the king's knights. In 1284–85, he took part in King Philip III's disastrous invasion of Catalonia. Philip did manage to captured the city of Girona, over he which he made Eustache governor. Philip died late in 1285, and in February 1288 his successor confirmed Eustache as a royal knight and seneschal of Toulouse in letters patent. In 1291, Eustache exchanged some property with the king.

In the county of Toulouse, Eustache oversaw the construction of 22 bastides: Rimont (1272), Alan (1272), Montréjeau (1272), Fleurance (1274), Valence-d'Albigeois (Note: Today, there is a middle school in Valence-d'Albigeois named Collège Eustache de Beaumarchais.) (1275), Beaumont-de-Lomagne (1279), Verdun-sur-Garonne (1279), Saint-Lys (1280), Mirande (1281), Pavie (1281), Cazères (1282), Cologne (1284), Miélan (1284), Plaisance-du-Touch (1285), Réjaumont (1285), Pampelonne (1285), Boulogne-sur-Gesse (1286), Valentine (1287), Aurimont (1287), Beaumarchés (Note: Eustache may be the origin of this bastide's name (Bellum Marquesium).) (1288), Grenade-sur-Garonne (1290) and Sorde (1290). He also gave a charter of privileges to the bastide of Grenade-sur-Garonne.

== Sources ==
- Boudet, Marcellin (1901). Dans les montagnes d'Auvergne de 1260 à 1325: Eustache de Beaumarchais, seigneur de Calvinet et sa famille. Aurillac: E. Bancharel.
