= Grenade, Haute-Garonne =

Grenade
- Commune
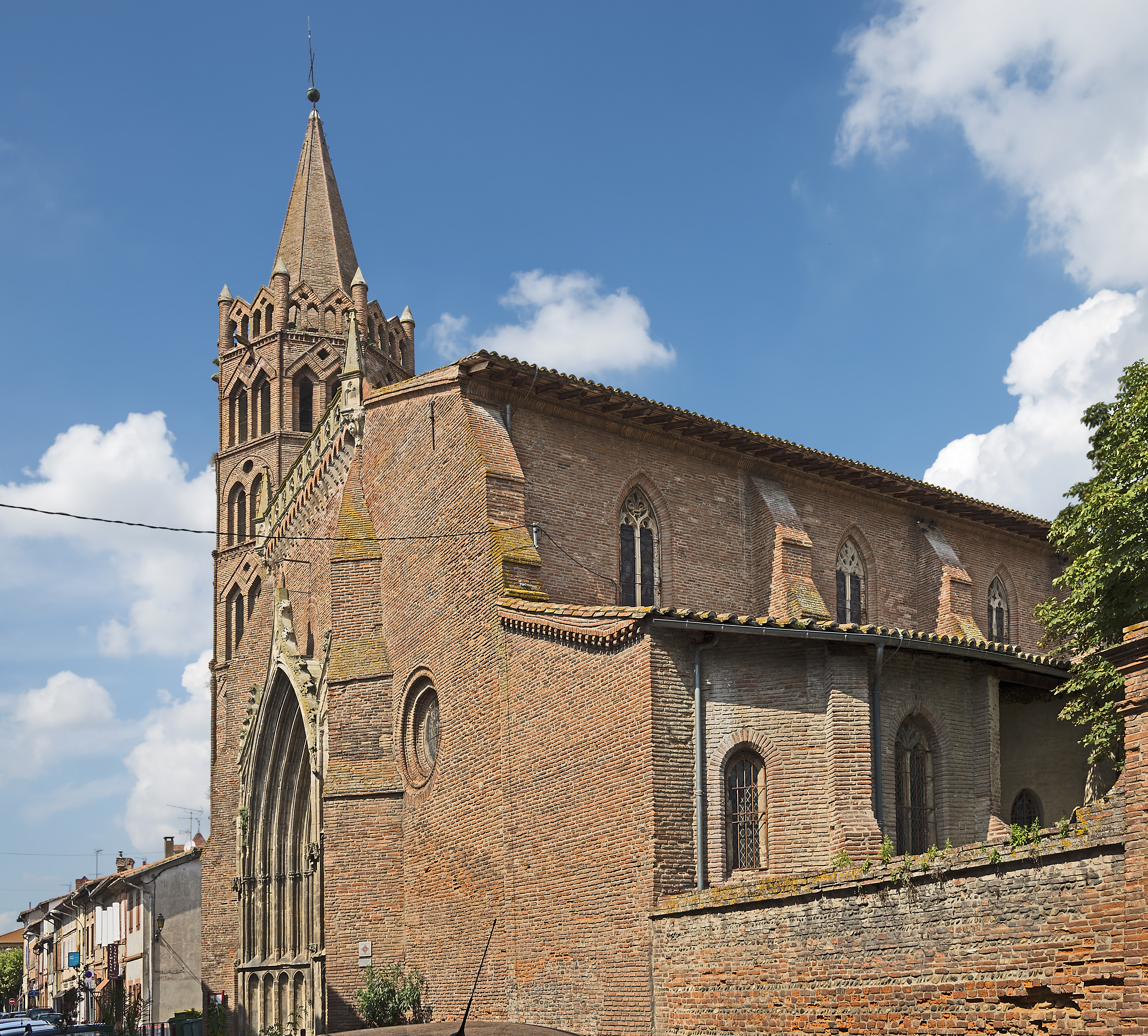
- The church in Grenade

- Coat of arms
- Location of Grenade
- Location within France Location within Occitanie
- Coordinates: 43°46′20″N 1°17′37″E
- Country: France
- Region: Occitania
- Department: Haute-Garonne
- Arrondissement: Toulouse
- Canton: Léguevin

Government
  - Mayor (2020–2026): Jean-Paul Delmas
- Area^{1}: 37.01 km^{2} (14.29 sq mi)
- Elevation: 115 m (377 ft)
- Highest elevation: 167 m (548 ft)
- Lowest elevation: 97 m (318 ft)
- Population (2023): 9,062
  - Density: 244.9/km^{2} (634.2/sq mi)
- Time zone: UTC+01:00 (CET)
  - Summer (DST): UTC+02:00 (CEST)
- INSEE/Postal code: 31232 /31330
- ^{1} French Land Register data, which excludes lakes, ponds, glaciers > 1 km^{2} (0.386 sq mi or 247 acres) and river estuaries.

Grenade (French pronunciation: [ɡʁənad]; Languedocien: Granada), also referred to as Grenade-sur-Garonne, is a commune in the Haute-Garonne department in southwestern France.

== History ==
The town is a bastide founded in the 1290s on the initiative of the Cistercian monks of the Abbey of Grandselve who had founded Beaumont-de-Lomagne ten years earlier. The city is the subject of a paréage agreement between the monks and the seneschal Eustache de Beaumarchais representing King Philip IV. The new bastides created at this time are baptized with the names of large influential cities of the time, from Spain or Italy, such as Fleurance (Florence), or Cologne. Grenada is therefore called so to show that it is destined to be an influential city in the South West of France. It has also been suggested that Granada comes from the Latin Granat - meaning grain - as the region was noted for its agriculture. Later, when the king had regained control of the different regions of the South-West, a “network” of bastides was created. Under this royal protection, Granada prospered thanks to the cultivation of the cleared plains around it. Moreover, the initial plan of the city provided for more than 3,000 dwellings, but only 1,000 were built.

== Population ==
Historical population

Year	Pop.	±% p.a.
1793	4,360	—
1800	3,333	−3.76%
1806	3,886	+2.59%
1821	3,925	+0.07%
1831	4,112	+0.47%
1836	4,286	+0.83%
1841	4,281	−0.02%
1846	4,444	+0.75%
1851	4,364	−0.36%
1856	4,302	−0.29%
1861	4,158	−0.68%
1866	4,204	+0.22%
1872	4,007	−0.80%
1876	3,973	−0.21%
1881	3,906	−0.34%
1886	3,998	+0.47%
1891	3,924	−0.37%
1896	3,622	−1.59%
1901	3,599	−0.13%

Year	Pop.	±% p.a.
1906	3,606	+0.04%
1911	3,302	−1.75%
1921	2,869	−1.40%
1926	3,012	+0.98%
1931	2,927	−0.57%
1936	2,793	−0.93%
1946	2,974	+0.63%
1954	3,235	+1.06%
1962	3,394	+0.60%
1968	4,108	+3.23%
1975	4,540	+1.44%
1982	4,784	+0.75%
1990	5,026	+0.62%
1999	5,767	+1.54%
2007	7,106	+2.64%
2012	8,310	+3.18%
2017	8,847	+1.26%
2023	9,062	+0.40%

Source: EHESS and INSEE (1968-2023)

== Monuments ==
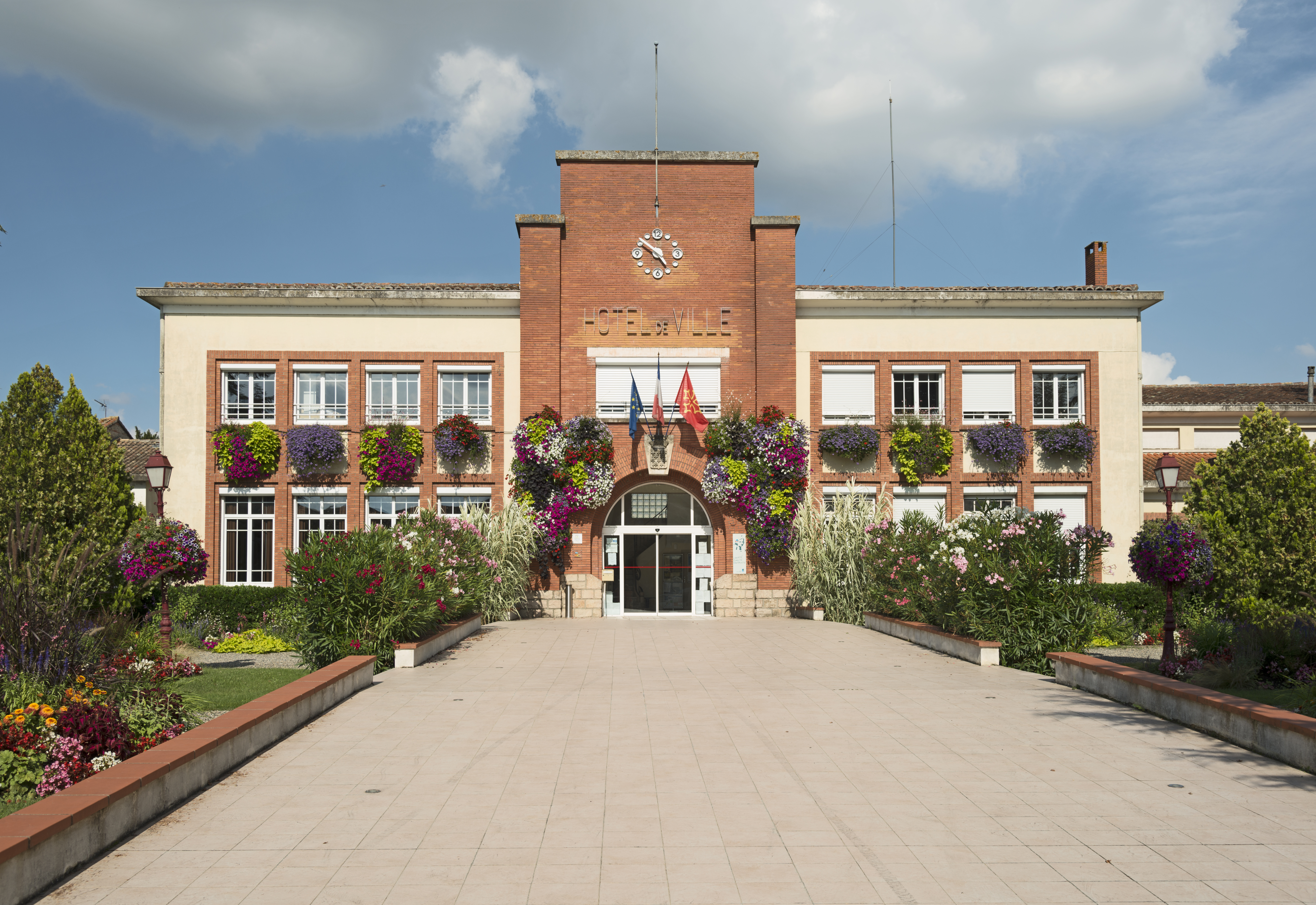
Town hall

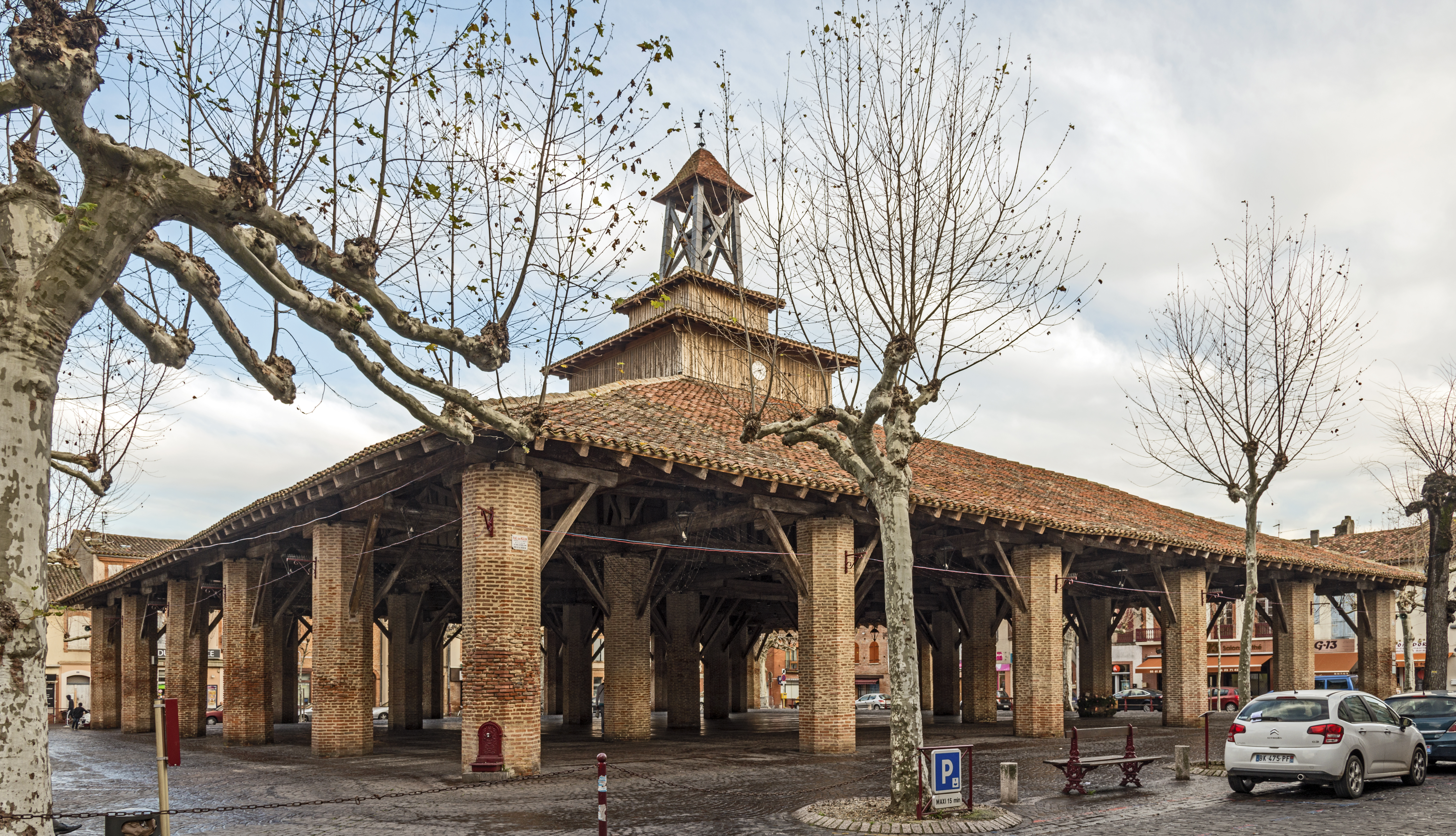
Market hall

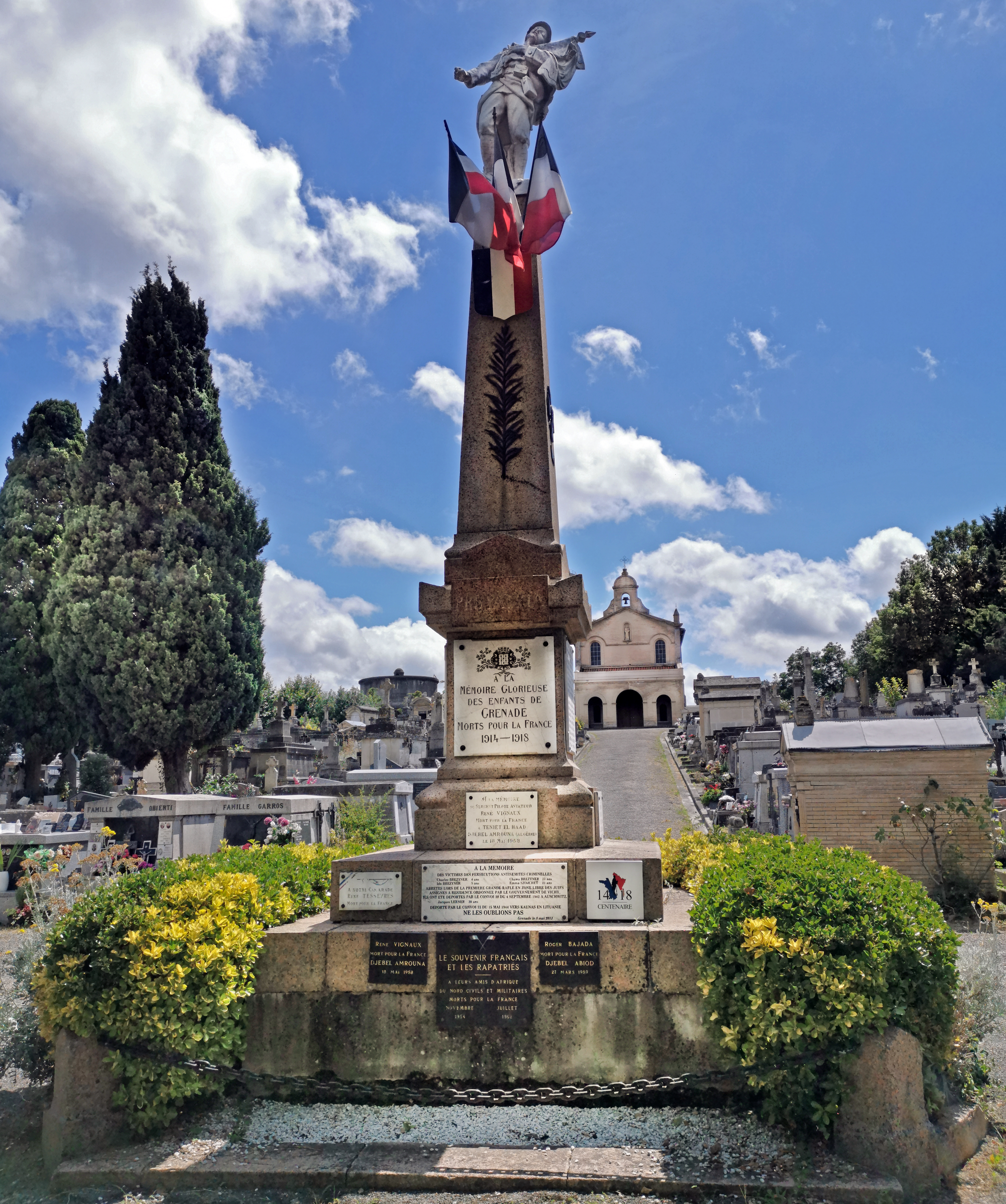
War memorial

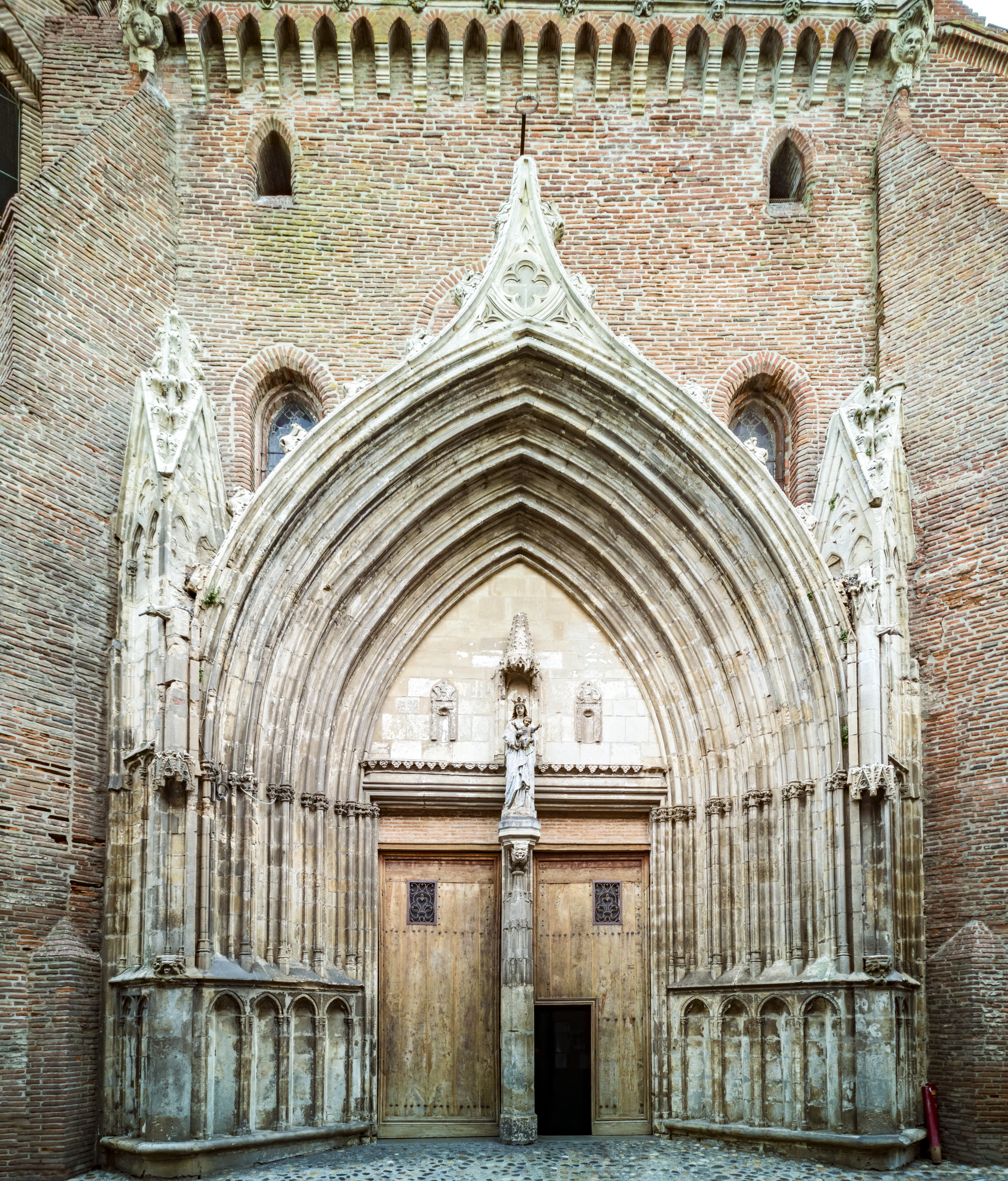
Church portal

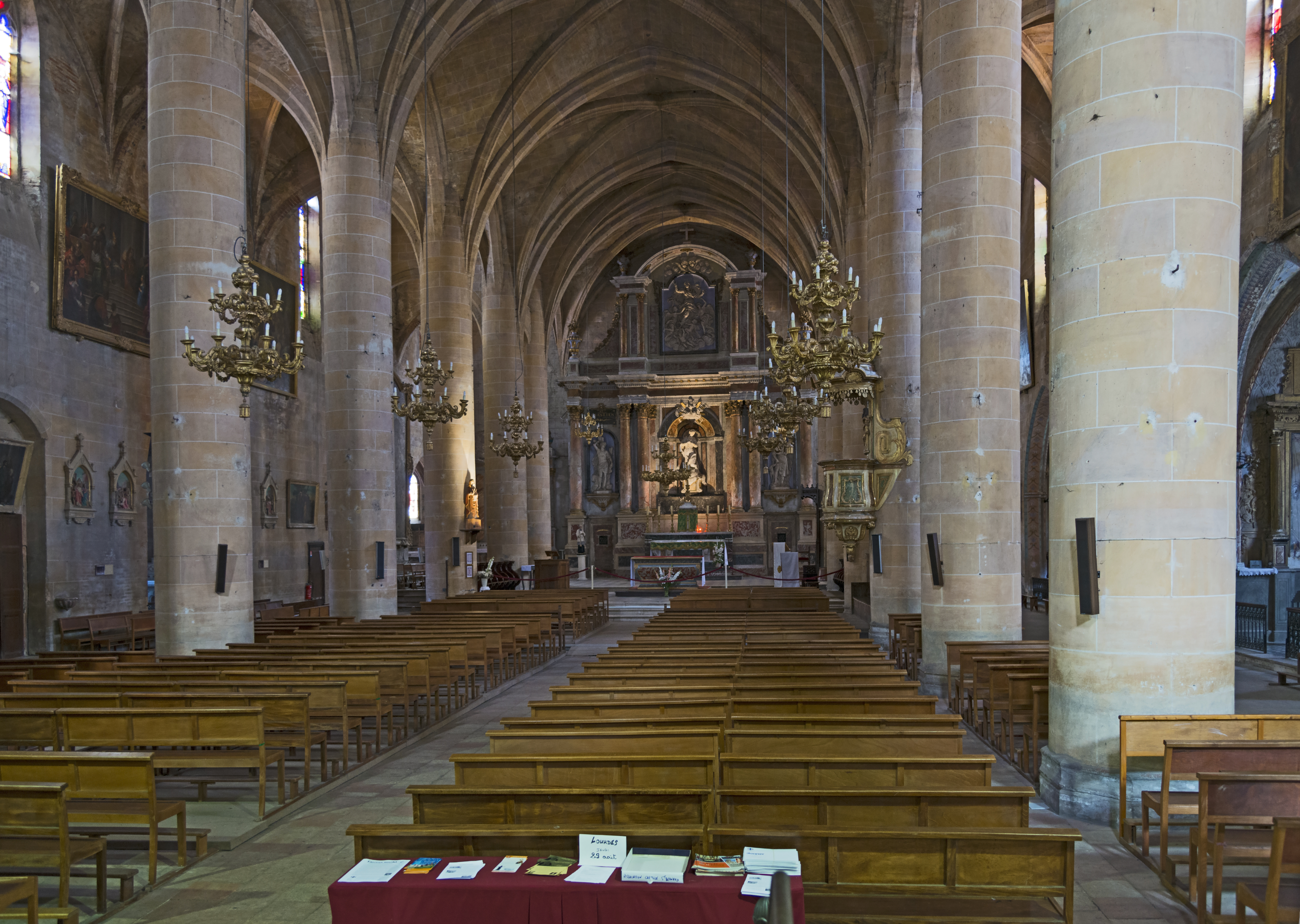
Church interior

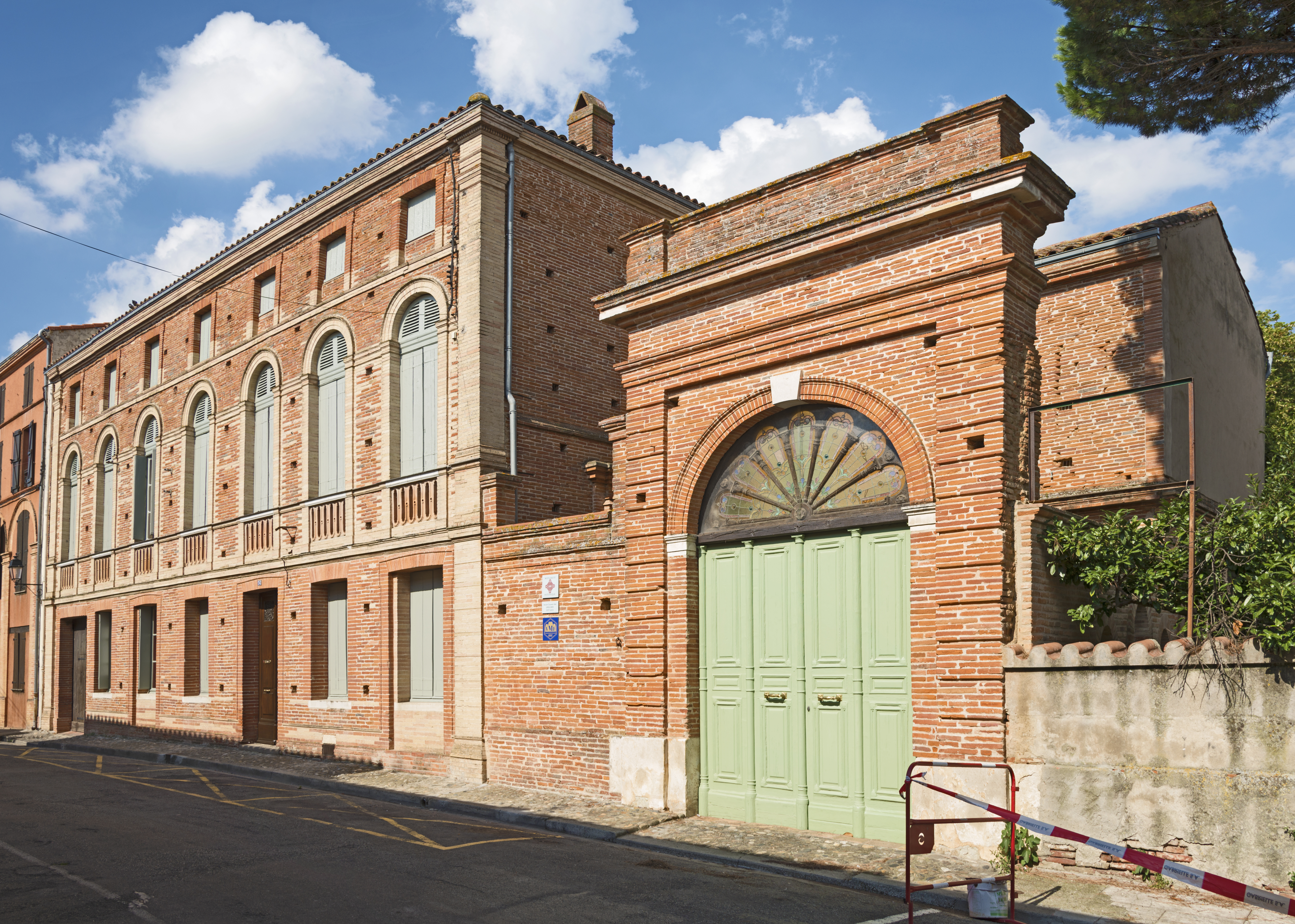
Convent

== See also ==
- Communes of the Haute-Garonne department
- Save (Garonne)
