= 40 Devonshire Street =

Building in Westminster, London, England

Coordinates: 51.5217°N 0.1473°W

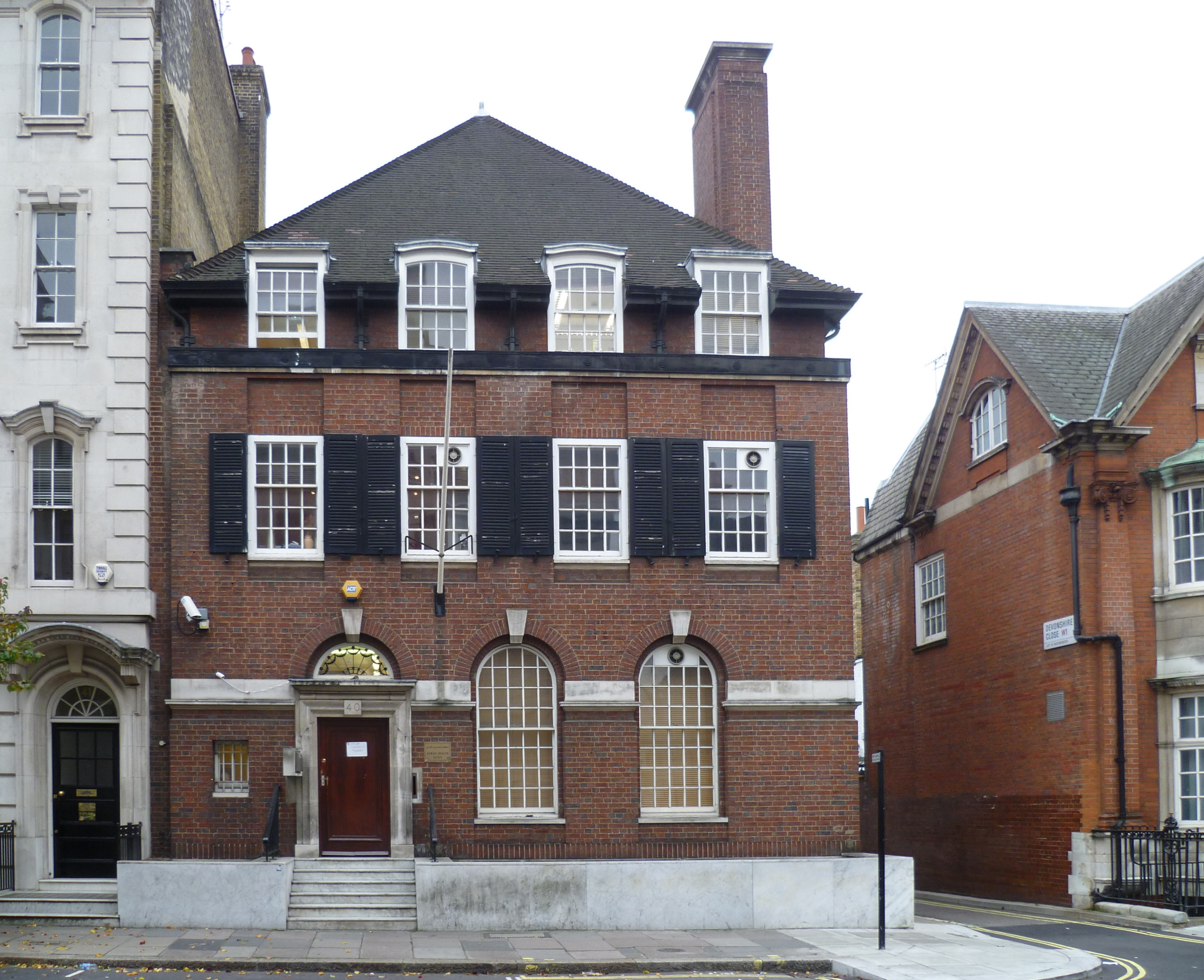
40 Devonshire Street

40 Devonshire Street is a grade II listed town house in Devonshire Street, in the City of Westminster, London.

The house was built around 1910 in red brick with stone dressings in the arts and crafts Georgian revival style on a tall stone plinth. It was part of an attempt by the Portland Estate to revive the residential character of the area which they felt had become too professional. It is used as the health office of the Embassy of Kuwait in London.
