= Gérard Errera =

French diplomat

Gérard Errera CVO
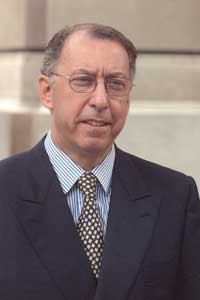

French ambassador to the United Kingdom
- In office 2002–2007
- President: Jacques Chirac
- Preceded by: Daniel Bernard
- Succeeded by: Maurice Gourdault-Montagne

Personal details
- Born: 30 October 1943 (age 83) Brive-la-Gaillarde, France
- Education: Sciences Po, ÉNA
- Profession: Diplomat

Gérard Paul Errera CVO (born 30 October 1943) is a former French diplomat and currently serves as the Chairman of the Blackstone Group, France.

== Early life and education ==
Gérard Errera comes from a Jewish family, and was born in Brive-la-Gaillarde, in what was, during World War II, France's Free Zone. The Erreras were hidden and saved by a French family during the German occupation under the Vichy regime. Right after the war, he moved to Paris where he completed his education, and graduated from two French elite institutions, L'Institut d'Etudes Politiques de Paris (Sciences Po), and the Ecole Nationale d'Administration (ENA).

Gérard Errera is the brother of Roger Errera (1933–2014), who was a member of the Conseil d'Etat, and director of the Diaspora series (Calmann-Lévy), and whose life and work is remembered through a website: www.rogererrera.fr.

== Current career and board memberships ==
Errera is chairman of the Blackstone Group France, and member of Blackstone International Advisory Board. Errera, a supporter of the arts, is also on the board of directors of the Musee des Arts decoratifs.

Errera served as a member of the supervisory board of Orano (formerly AREVA), the global leader in nuclear energy (2007-2009) and a Director of Electricité de France (EDF, 2007-2009). He is a frequent contributor to the Financial Times and other international newspapers.

== Diplomatic career ==
Errera has spent the last two years before joining Blackstone as secretary general of the French Ministry of Foreign Affairs from 2007 to 2009. This is the highest-ranking position in the French Foreign service, and effectively oversaw the foreign policy and all French diplomatic missions, alongside the minister.

During that time, Errera was appointed by the French president Sarkozy, as "Ambassadeur de France", a lifelong dignity, and the highest title a French career diplomat.

Prior to this Errera was the French ambassador to the United Kingdom for five years, from 2002 to 2007. At a time when Franco-British relationships were particularly tense, Gerard Errera was especially appreciated by the British, being called by the press "one of the wittiest and wisest diplomats in modern times, a worthy follower in the footsteps of Talleyrand". Mr Errera was a fierce defender of the principled and moral view not to invade Iraq, and was characterised as a"model of discretion, and master of the unspoken inference".

He also served as the French ambassador to the North Atlantic Treaty Organization (NATO) and director general for political affairs. During that time, he was one of the architects of the St Malo Treaty in 1998, which was the founding moment of European defence

He was the French special representative of President Chirac for strategic dialogue with India during 1998–2002. Before that, Gerard Errera was director for international affairs at the French Atomic Energy Commission and governor for France at the International Atomic Energy Agency. From 1991 to 1995, he served as the French ambassador to the Conference on Disarmament in Geneva.

Errera started his career at the French embassy in Washington, then was appointed as special adviser to the French foreign minister. He also served as the French general consul in San Francisco, at the time of the development of the Silicon Valley, and in Madrid from 1977 to 1980.

== Family ==
He is married to Virginia Bedoya Calvo, who is Bolivian-Argentinian. They have three children together: Philippe, Emmanuelle and Alexandre. His eldest son, Philippe, is also a diplomat.

== Distinctions ==
- Ambassadeur de France,
- Légion d'Honneur (Officer)
- Ordre du Mérite (Officer)
- Royal Victorian Order (CVO, Commander)
- Order of the White Rose of Finland (Officer)
- Order of Saint Charles, Monaco (Knight)
- Orden del Merito Civil (Officer)
