= Jean Guéguinou =

French diplomat (1941–2021)

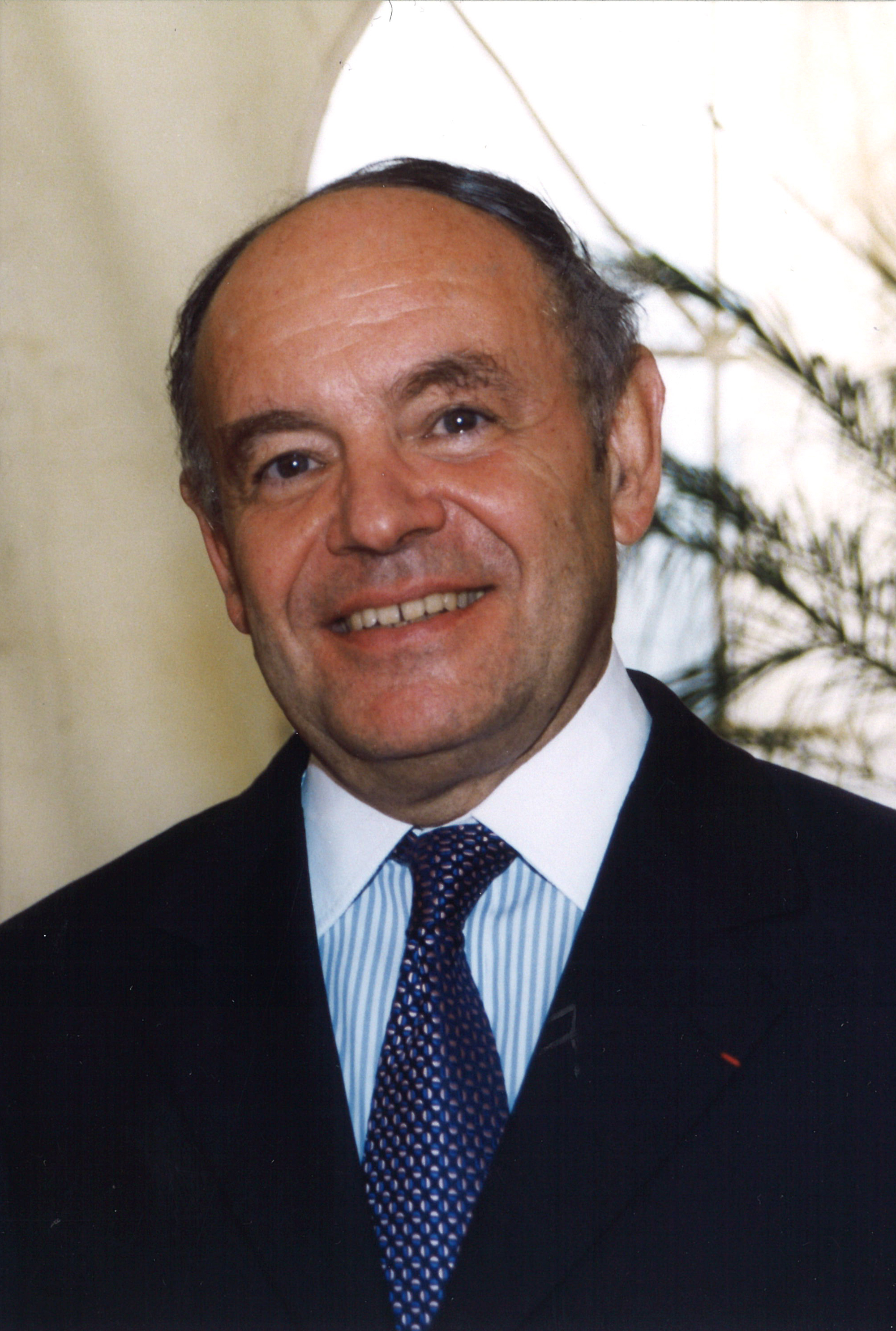

Permanent Representative of France to UNESCO
- In office 2000 – 2006

French Ambassador to the Vatican City
- In office 1993 – 1998

French Ambassador to the United Kingdom
- In office 1993 – 1998

French Ambassador to Czechoslovakia
- In office 1990 – 1993

Consul-General in Jerusalem
- In office 1982 – 1986
- Preceded by: Bernard Lopinot
- Succeeded by: Jean-Claude Cousseran

Personal details
- Born: 17 October 1941 Carhaix-Plouguer, France
- Died: 21 June 2021 (aged 79)

Jean Guéguinou (17 October 1941 – 21 June 2021) was a French diplomat, who served as ambassador to Czechoslovakia (1990–1993), the United Kingdom (1993–1998), and the Vatican City (1993–1998). Guéguinou also served as Consul-General in Jerusalem from 1982 to 1986 and as France's permanent representative to UNESCO from 2000 to 2006.

== Early life ==
Jean Guéguinou was born on 17 October 1941 in Carhaix-Plouguer, Brittany, France.

== Death ==
Guéguinou died on 21 June 2021 at the age of 79.
