= Daniel Bernard (diplomat) =

French diplomat

Ambassador of France to the United Kingdom
- In office 1998–2002
- President: Jacques Chirac
- Preceded by: Jean Guéguinou
- Succeeded by: Gérard Errera

Personal details
- Born: 13 September 1941 Lyon, France
- Died: 29 April 2004 (aged 62) Paris, France
- Education: HEC Paris
- Occupation: Diplomat

Daniel Bernard (13 September 1941; Lyon – 29 April 2004; Paris) was a French diplomat who served as the Ambassador to the United Kingdom and Algeria. He is remembered for a controversial remark about Israel.

== Controversial remark ==
=== Reported remark ===
In 2001, Daniel Bernard came to public attention when, as French Ambassador to the United Kingdom, he was quoted as saying: "All the current troubles in the world are because of that shitty little country, Israel." The diplomat added, "Why should the world be in danger of World War III because of those people?"

The remark was reported to have taken place during a conversation with Conrad Black of The Daily Telegraph at a private dinner party Black was hosting. Bernard's comment was then later repeated in an article written by Black's wife, Barbara Amiel, in The Daily Telegraph.

Initially, Bernard stated that he could not remember making it, but later insisted that what he said had been thoroughly distorted. Bernard's press secretary stated, "He does not deny the remarks, he just says first of all what he said was distorted." He also stated that he was outraged that a private discussion was reported by the media and clearly stated that he would not apologise.

Bernard's spokesman, Yves Charpentier, stated that Bernard felt there was no need for him to apologize. He stated that "In the course of the discussion the ambassador referred to 'little Israel' in the sense that it is geographically small, but that nevertheless the scale of the consequences is huge and the repercussions around the world are tremendous."

=== Bernard's response ===
In a subsequent letter to The Daily Telegraph, Bernard insisted his remarks had been distorted, writing that:

'Over the past few days, I have been the subject of grave accusations because of a comment I am reported to have made during a conversation with Lord Black. The facts are: while we were discussing the Israeli-Palestinian issue, I pointed out to Lord Black that this tragedy was taking place in a geographically limited area (I even specified that it was the equivalent of three French departments) that for 40 years had been suffering from a conflict whose equitable solution seems more out of reach than ever. Of course, I never meant to insult Israel or any other part of that region. The deliberately biased presentation of this conversation in some circles, accompanied by malicious accusations, is deeply shocking and insulting.'

=== Reaction ===
The British press saw a firestorm as a result, as comment on the 23 December 2001 in The Daily Telegraph exemplifies. One British journalist, Deborah Orr did defend Bernard.

British Labour MPs Jim Murphy and Gwyneth Dunwoody wrote to French President Jacques Chirac that asking that Bernard either resign or be removed from his position. Murphy stated that "If these are his views, then the French government should take action. Such views are simply not consistent with the post he holds" while Dunwoody stated that "These comments are eerily familiar from the French. He should resign immediately and I'm writing to President Chirac to demand that if he does not resign, then he should be sacked."

In Israel, the remark sparked outrage, with Raanan Gissin, spokesman for Israeli Prime Minister Ariel Sharon calling Bernard's statement "a pure anti-Semitic expression" and further stating that the French Government "should draw the conclusions of a senior representative of a nation making an anti-Semitic remark". Gissin also stated that "If the French government does not take action, it would imply that the French government condones it and I think that would be inconceivable."

In the United States, the Anti-Defamation League stated that "It is highly troubling that a French government official would make such crude anti-Israel statements" and called for the French Foreign Ministry to investigate Bernard's remarks.

The French Foreign Ministry defended Bernard and dismissed the charges of antisemitism. A Ministry spokesman stated that "These malevolent insinuations have been addressed very clearly by our ambassador in London and I suggest you refer back to that."

The French Press was also largely supportive of Bernard, while recognising that Bernard was a flamboyant character. His obituary in Le Monde in 2004 also illustrates the same points.

Bernard was reassigned to become France's ambassador to Algeria in July 2002. He died in April 2004 while serving in that post, at the age of 62.
