= Embassy of Kuwait, London =

Embassy of Kuwait in London
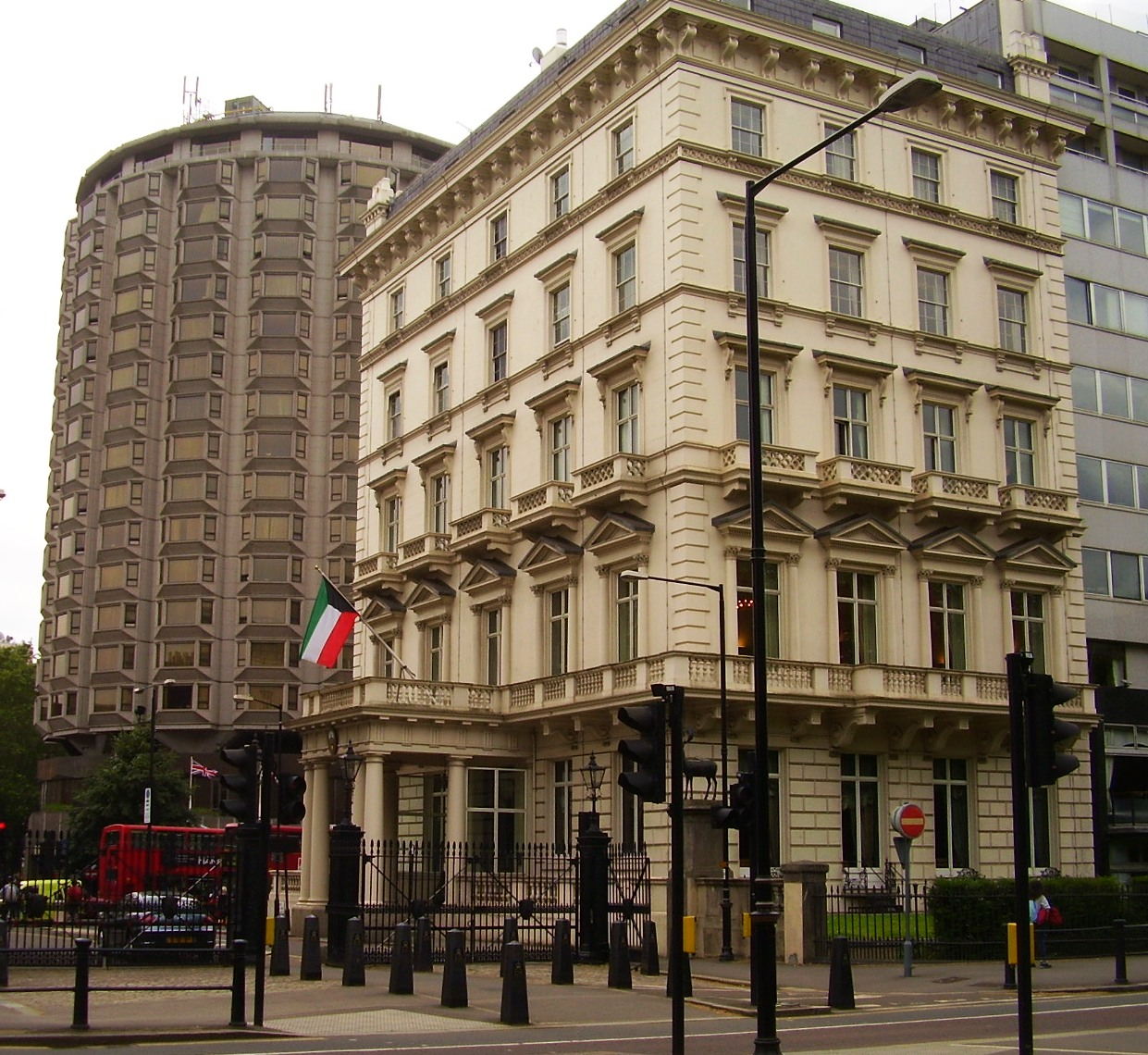
- Location: Knightsbridge, London
- Address: 2 Albert Gate, London, SW1X 7JU
- Coordinates: 51.5024°N 0.1587°W
- Ambassador: Dean of the Diplomatic Corps Mr. Khaled Al-Duwaisan

The Embassy of Kuwait in London is the diplomatic mission of Kuwait in the United Kingdom. It is located just off Knightsbridge at Albert Gate, one of the entrances to Hyde Park. It is situated immediately opposite the French Embassy.

The building, along with the rest of Albert Gate, was the creation of British architect Thomas Cubitt; at the time of their construction in the 1840s they were by far the tallest structures in the neighbourhood.

Kuwait also maintains a Health Office at 40 Devonshire Street, Marylebone and an Investment Office at Wren House, 15 Carter Lane, City of London.

In 2011 a protest was held outside the embassy by Kuwaiti Bidoons alleging that the Kuwaiti government discriminates against their community.

== Gallery ==
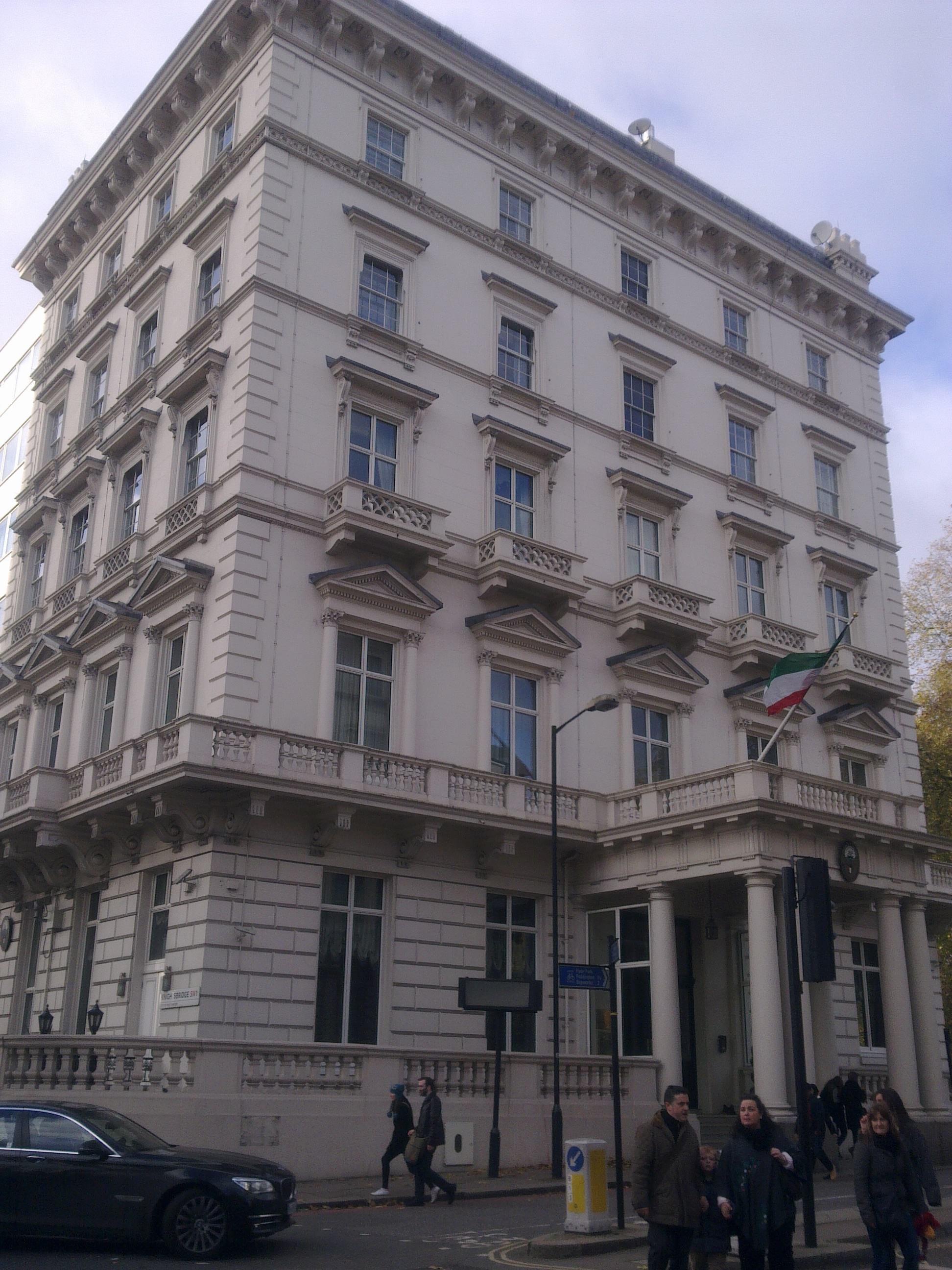
The embassy seen from Knightsbridge

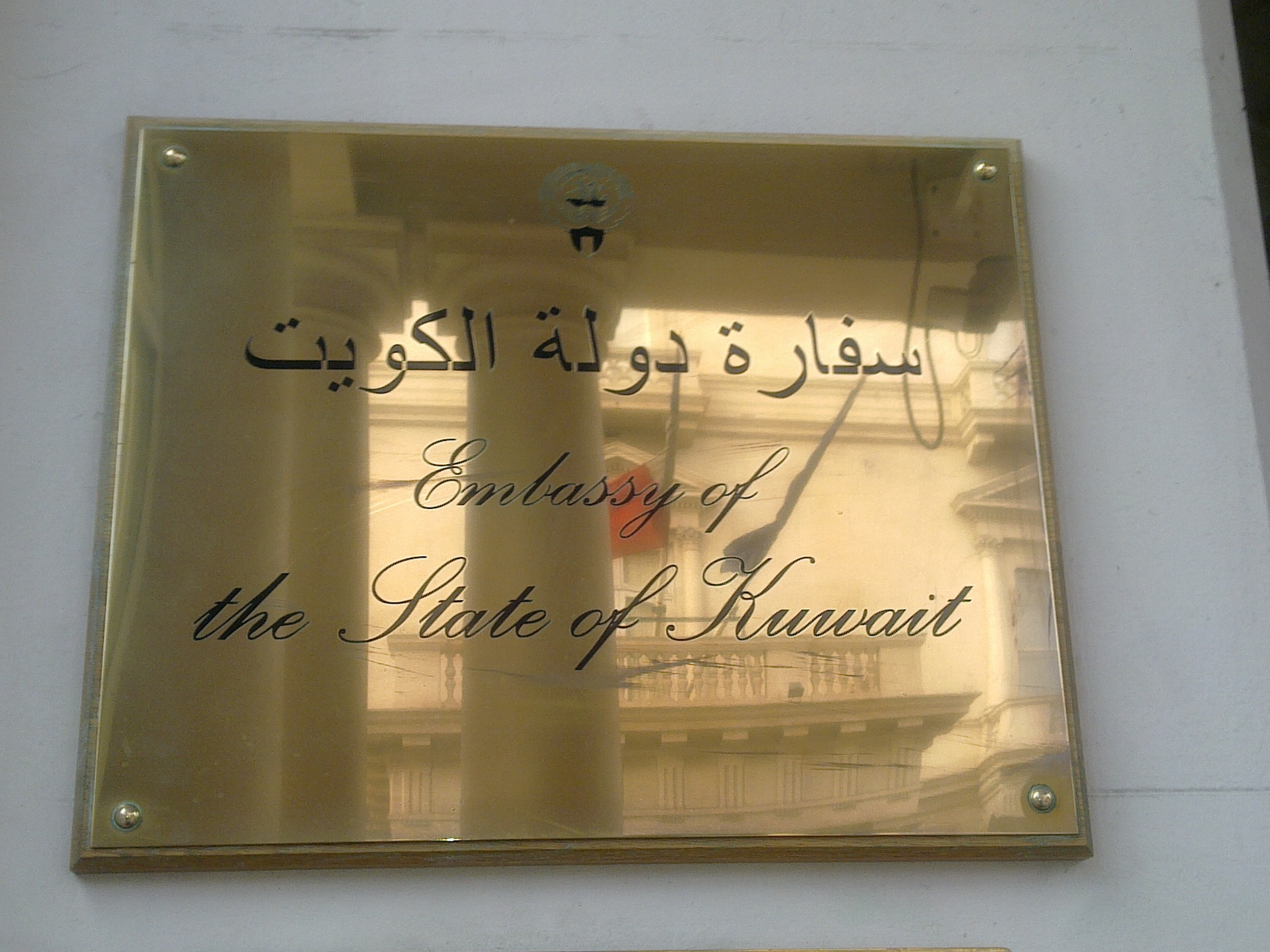
Plaque outside the embassy in Arabic and English depicting the Emblem of Kuwait

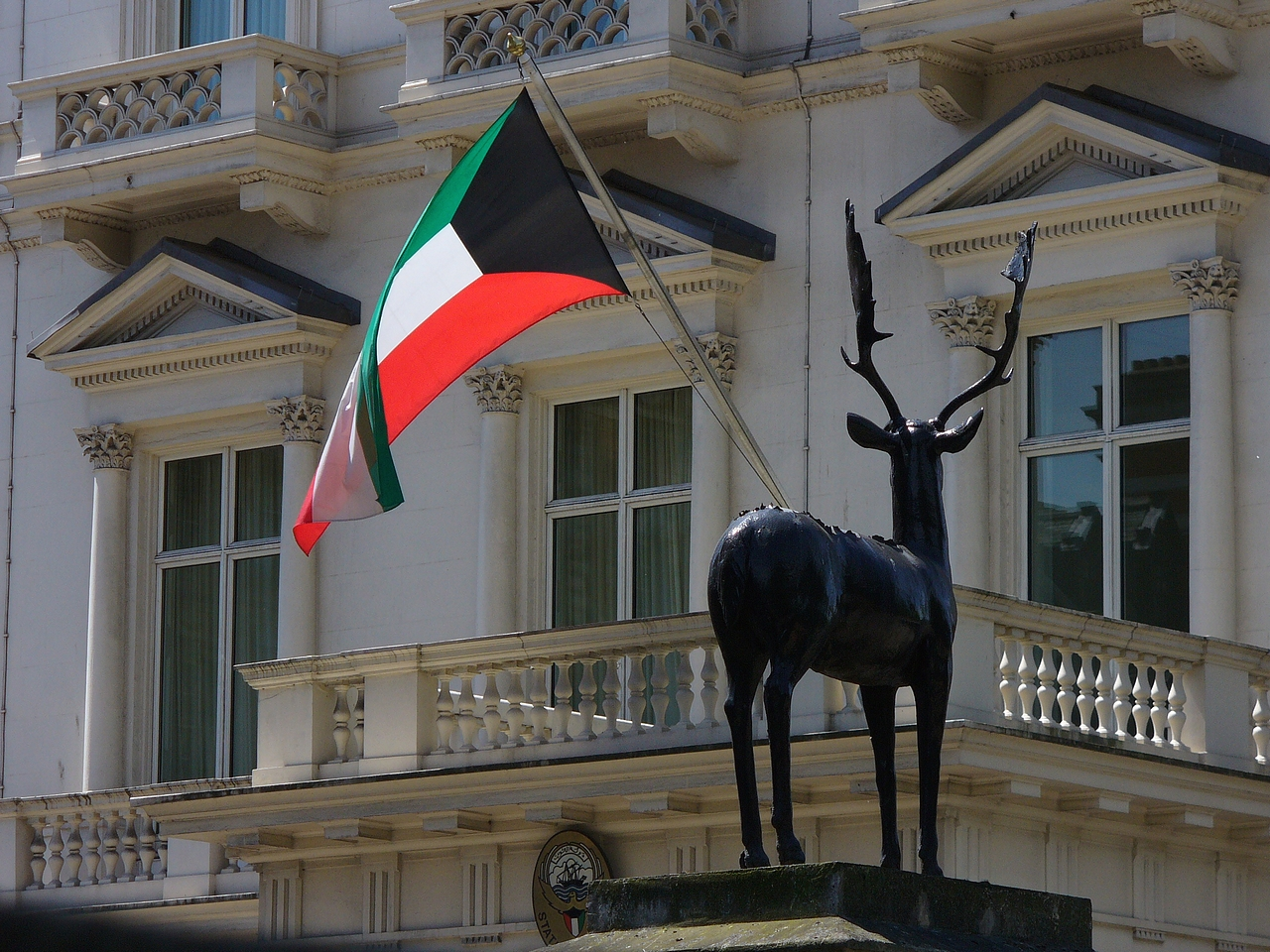
Kuwaiti flag outside the embassy

== See also ==
- List of diplomatic missions of Kuwait
- Embassy of Kuwait, Washington, D.C.
