= Hélène Tréheux-Duchêne =

French diplomat (born 1963)

Her Excellency Hélène Duchêne
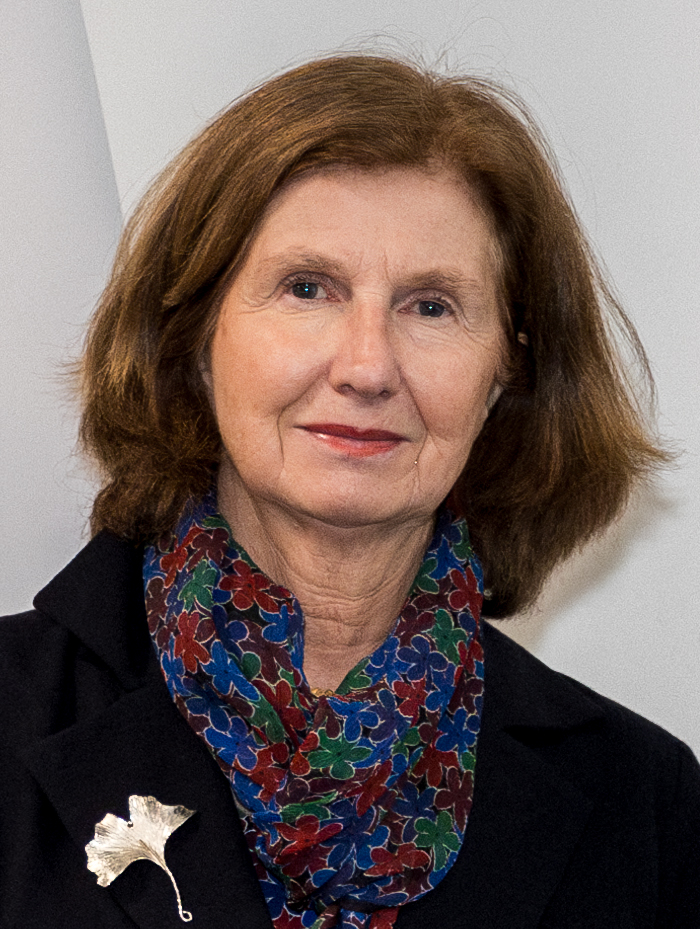
- Tréheux-Duchêne in 2025

Ambassador of France to the United Kingdom
- Incumbent
- Assumed office 9 February 2023
- President: Emmanuel Macron
- Preceded by: Catherine Colonna

Personal details
- Born: Hélène Julia Émilie Tréheux; 7 January 1963 (age 63) Nancy, France
- Education: École normale supérieure Sciences Po; École nationale d'administration
- Profession: Diplomat
- Website: www.ambafrance-uk.org/-French-Embassy

Hélène Julia Émilie Tréheux-Duchêne (French pronunciation: [elɛn tʁeødyʃɛn]; born 7 January 1963) is a French career diplomat who was appointed ambassador of France to the United Kingdom on 12 October 2022. She presented her credentials to King Charles III on 9 February 2023. Tréheux-Duchêne previously was France's permanent representative to NATO (2016–2019).

== Biography ==
The daughter of Professor Jacques Tréheux and Augusta née Beauchot, she read modern literature at ENS Paris and after graduating she pursued further studies at Sciences Po then at ENA where she met her future husband, Rémi Duchêne.

After joining the French diplomatic service at the Quai d'Orsay in 1989, she rose quickly through the ranks via various EU postings to become France's permanent representative the UN in Geneva (1999–2002) and to NATO (2016–2019). In 2019 she was appointed ambassador to the United Kingdom.

== Honours ==
- Chevalier, Légion d'honneur (2012)
- Officier, Ordre national du Mérite (2025)

== See also ==
- List of ambassadors of France to the United Kingdom
