= Aurimont =

- Commune
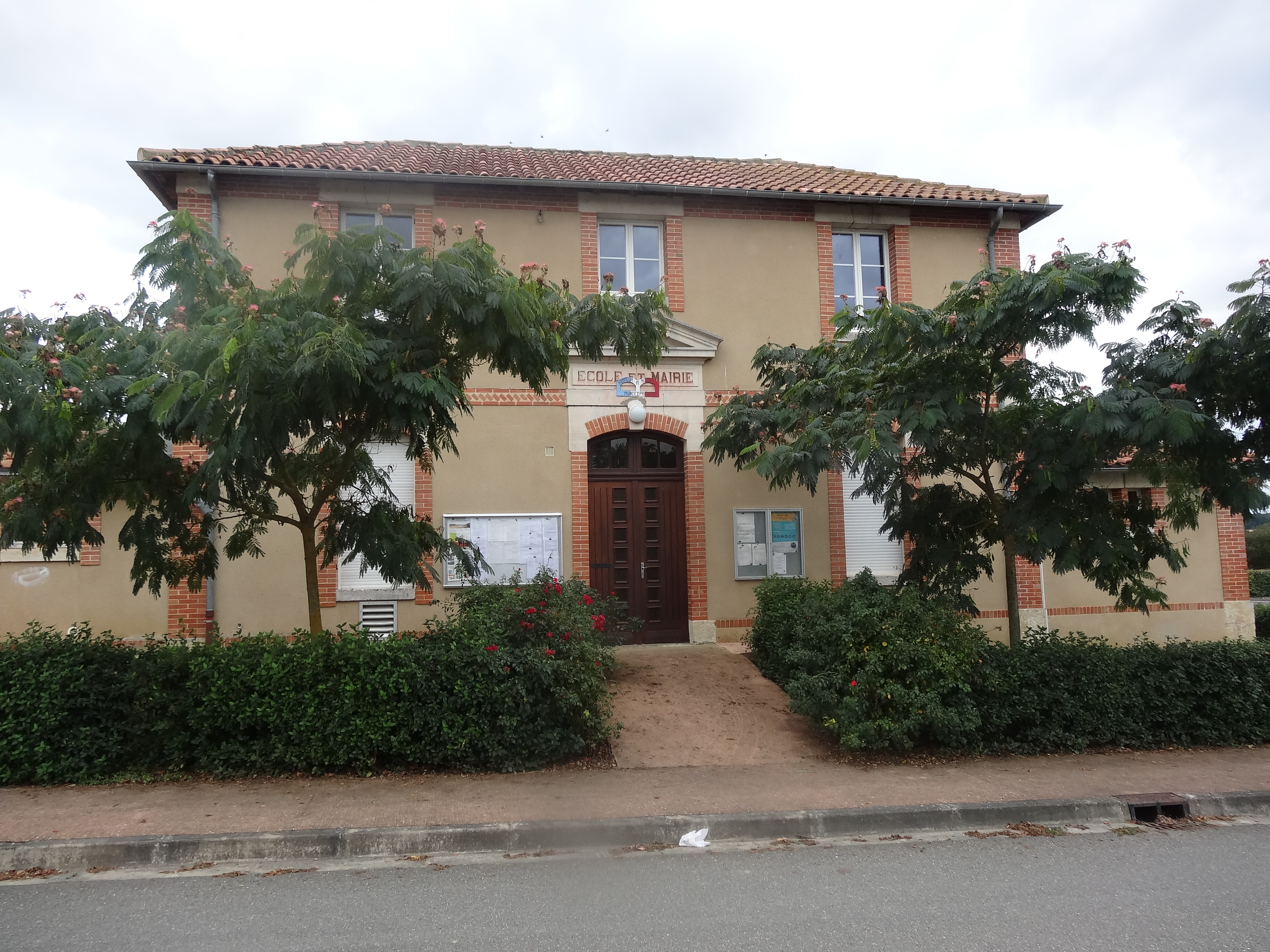
- The town hall in Aurimont
- Location of Aurimont
- Location within France Location within Occitanie
- Coordinates: 43°34′27″N 0°49′18″E
- Country: France
- Region: Occitania
- Department: Gers
- Arrondissement: Auch
- Canton: Astarac-Gimone
- Intercommunality: CC Coteaux Arrats Gimone

Government
  - Mayor (2020–2026): Jacques Faure
- Area^{1}: 8.07 km^{2} (3.12 sq mi)
- Elevation: 180 m (590 ft)
- Highest elevation: 235 m (771 ft)
- Lowest elevation: 157 m (515 ft)
- Population (2023): 211
  - Density: 26.1/km^{2} (67.7/sq mi)
- Time zone: UTC+01:00 (CET)
  - Summer (DST): UTC+02:00 (CEST)
- INSEE/Postal code: 32018 /32450
- ^{1} French Land Register data, which excludes lakes, ponds, glaciers > 1 km^{2} (0.386 sq mi or 247 acres) and river estuaries.

Aurimont (French pronunciation: [oʁimɔ̃]) is a commune in the Gers department in southwestern France.

== Geography ==
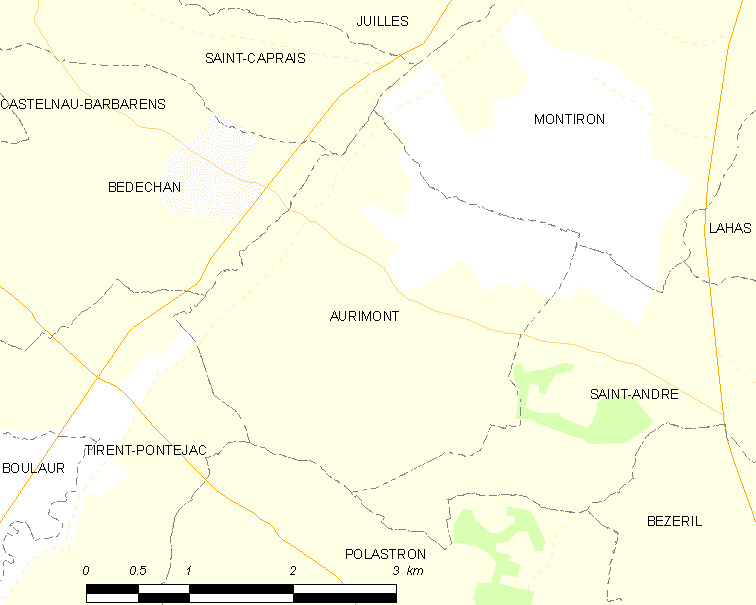
Aurimont and its surrounding communes

== Population ==
Historical population
Year	Pop.	±% p.a.
1968	143	—
1975	107	−4.06%
1982	123	+2.01%
1990	119	−0.41%
1999	134	+1.33%
2007	157	+2.00%
2012	213	+6.29%
2017	205	−0.76%
2023	211	+0.48%
Source: INSEE

== See also ==
- Communes of the Gers department
