= Jacques Delarüe-Caron de Beaumarchais =

French diplomat

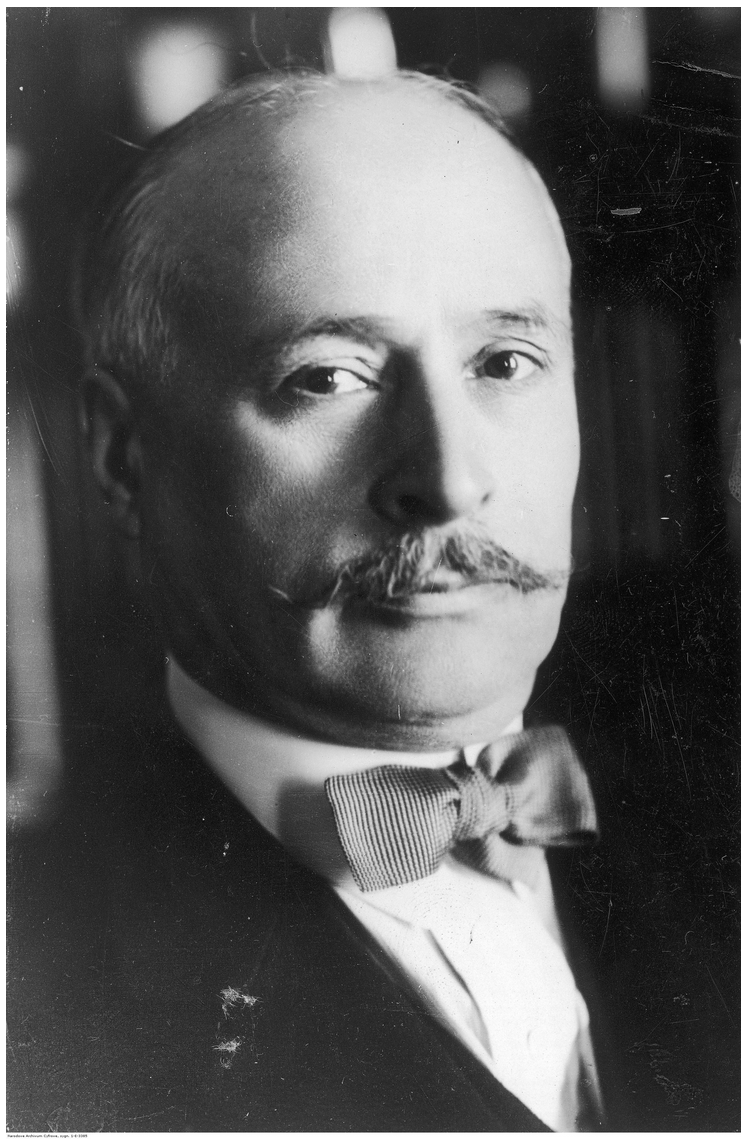
Jacques Delarüe-Caron de Beaumarchais in 1931

Jacques Delarüe-Caron de Beaumarchais (1913 - 1979) was French Ambassador to the United Kingdom from 1972 until 1977.

== Honours ==
- Commandeur, Légion d'honneur (1976)
- Commandeur, Ordre national du Mérite (1968)

== See also ==
- List of Ambassadors of France to the United Kingdom
