= List of diplomatic missions in Kuwait =

This is a list of diplomatic missions in Kuwait. There are currently 112 embassies in Kuwait City (not including honorary consulates).

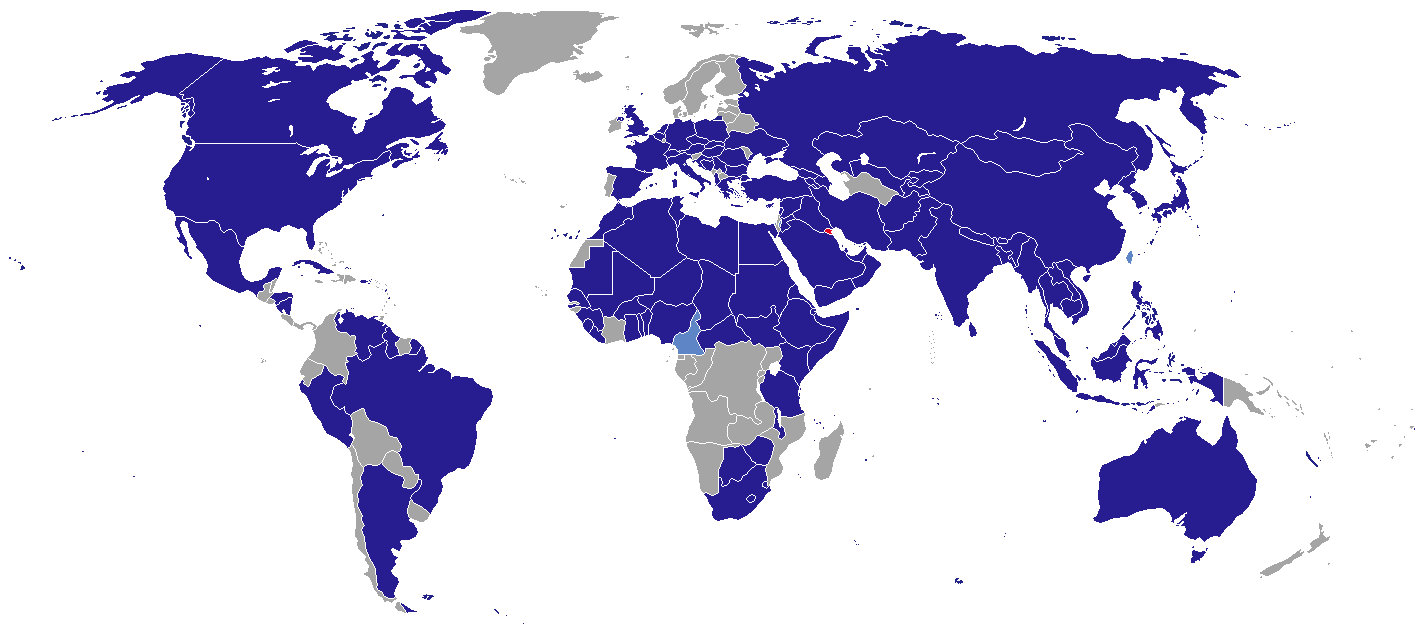
Map of countries that have diplomatic missions in Kuwait

== Embassies in Kuwait City ==
1. Afghanistan
2. Albania
3. Algeria
4. Argentina
5. Armenia
6. Australia
7. Austria
8. Azerbaijan
9. Bahrain
10. Bangladesh
11. Belgium
12. Benin
13. Bhutan
14. Bosnia and Herzegovina
15. Botswana
16. Brazil
17. Brunei
18. Bulgaria
19. Burkina Faso
20. Cambodia
21. Canada
22. Central African Republic
23. Chad
24. China
25. Comoros
26. Cuba
27. Croatia
28. Cyprus
29. Czech Republic
30. Djibouti
31. Egypt
32. Eritrea
33. Eswatini
34. Ethiopia
35. France
36. Georgia
37. Germany
38. Ghana
39. Greece
40. Guinea
41. Guyana
42. Holy See
43. Honduras
44. Hungary
45. India
46. Indonesia
47. Iran
48. Iraq
49. Italy
50. Japan
51. Jordan
52. Kazakhstan
53. Kenya
54. Kyrgyzstan
55. Laos
56. Lebanon
57. Lesotho
58. Liberia
59. Libya
60. Malawi
61. Malaysia
62. Mali
63. Malta
64. Mauritania
65. Mexico
66. Mongolia
67. Morocco
68. Myanmar
69. Nepal
70. Netherlands
71. Nicaragua
72. Niger
73. Nigeria
74. North Korea
75. Oman
76. Pakistan
77. Palestine
78. Peru
79. Philippines
80. Poland
81. Qatar
82. Romania
83. Russia
84. Saudi Arabia
85. Senegal
86. Serbia
87. Sierra Leone
88. Slovakia
89. Somalia
90. South Africa
91. South Korea
92. South Sudan
93. Spain
94. Sri Lanka
95. Sudan
96. Switzerland
97. Syria
98. Tajikistan
99. Tanzania
100. Thailand
101. Togo
102. Tunisia
103. Turkey
104. Ukraine
105. United Arab Emirates
106. United Kingdom
107. United States
108. Uzbekistan
109. Venezuela
110. Vietnam
111. Yemen
112. Zimbabwe

== Other posts in Kuwait City ==
- Cameroon (Consulate-General)
- Republic of China (Taiwan) (Taipei Commercial Representative Office)
- European Union (Delegation)

== Non-resident embassies ==
- Belarus (Abu Dhabi)
- Chile (Abu Dhabi)
- Cameroon (Riyadh)
- Colombia (Doha)
- Denmark (Riyadh)
- Ecuador (Cairo)
- Equatorial Guinea (Riyadh)
- Estonia (Abu Dhabi)
- Fiji (Abu Dhabi)
- Finland (Riyadh)
- Gambia (Riyadh)
- Guatemala (London)
- Ireland (Abu Dhabi)
- Iceland (Reykjavík)
- Latvia (Abu Dhabi)
- Lithuania (Abu Dhabi)
- Madagascar (Riyadh)
- Maldives (Riyadh)
- Namibia (Cairo)
- Norway (Abu Dhabi)
- New Zealand (Riyadh)
- Portugal (Abu Dhabi)
- Paraguay (Beirut)
- Seychelles (Abu Dhabi)
- Singapore (Abu Dhabi)
- Slovenia (Cairo)
- Sweden (Abu Dhabi)
- Turkmenistan (Abu Dhabi)
- Uganda (Riyadh)
- Zambia (Riyadh)

== Closed missions ==
Host city	Sending country	Mission	Year closed	Ref.
Kuwait City	Finland	Embassy (Note: Resident in Riyadh, Saudi Arabia)	2003	
Kuwait City	Jamaica	Embassy	2019	
Kuwait City	Sweden	Embassy (Note: Resident in Abu Dhabi, UAE)	2001	

== See also ==
- List of diplomatic missions of Kuwait
- Ministry of Foreign Affairs (Kuwait)
- Foreign relations of Kuwait
- Visa requirements for Kuwaiti citizens
