= List of diplomatic missions of Kuwait =

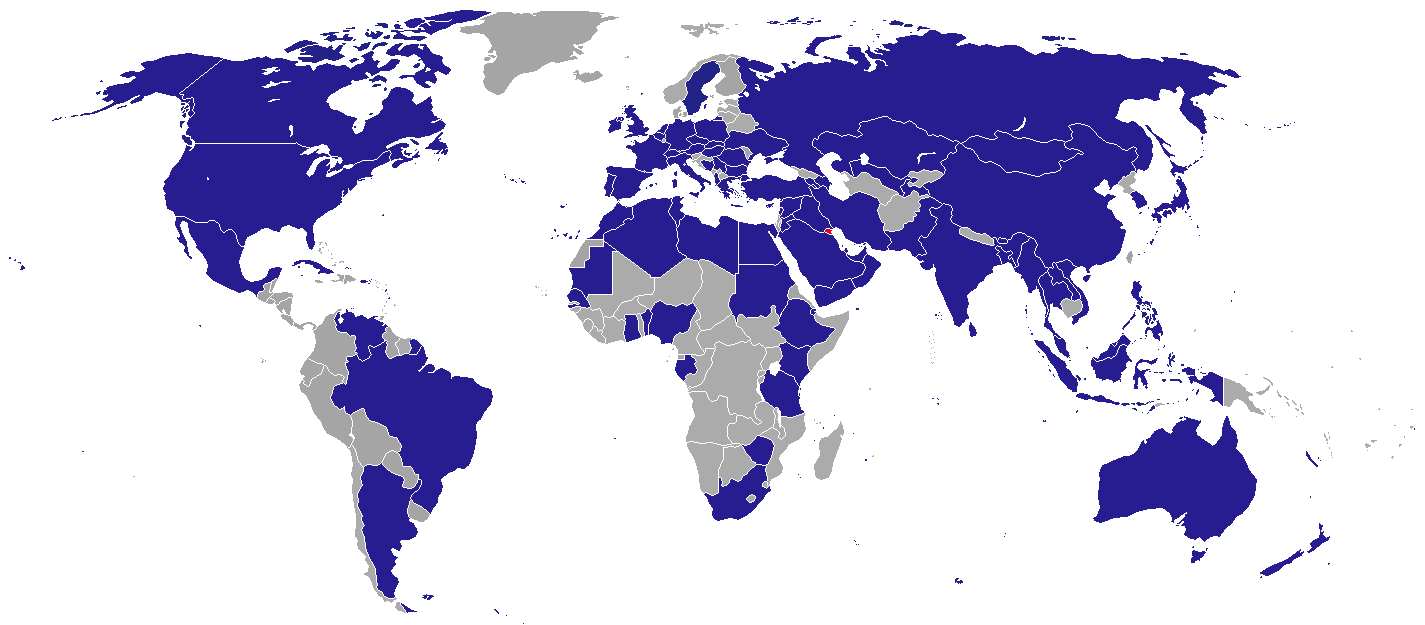
Location of diplomatic missions of Kuwait

This is the list of diplomatic missions of Kuwait. Kuwait maintains more than 100 diplomatic missions in countries around the world.

== Current missions ==
=== Africa ===
Host country	Host city	Mission	Concurrent accreditation	Ref.
Algeria	Algiers	Embassy		
Benin	Cotonou	Embassy		
Djibouti	Djibouti City	Embassy		
Egypt	Cairo	Embassy		
Ethiopia	Addis Ababa	Embassy	Countries: South Sudan; Uganda	
Ghana	Accra	Embassy	Countries: Burkina Faso; Ivory Coast	
Kenya	Nairobi	Embassy	Countries: Burundi; Rwanda; Multilateral Organizations: United Nations; United Nations Environment Programme; United Nations Human Settlements Programme	
Libya	Tripoli	Embassy		
Mauritania	Nouakchott	Embassy		
Morocco	Rabat	Embassy		
Nigeria	Abuja	Embassy	Countries: Cameroon	
Senegal	Dakar	Embassy	Countries: Cape Verde; Gambia; Liberia	
South Africa	Pretoria	Embassy	Countries: Botswana; Eswatini; Mauritius; Mozambique; Namibia	
Sudan	Khartoum	Embassy		
Tanzania	Dar Es Salaam	Embassy	Countries: Seychelles	
Tunisia	Tunis	Embassy		

=== Americas ===
Host country	Host city	Mission	Concurrent accreditation	Ref.
Argentina	Buenos Aires	Embassy	Countries: Chile; Paraguay; Uruguay	
Brazil	Brasília	Embassy	Countries: Ecuador; Guyana; Peru	
Canada	Ottawa	Embassy		
Cuba	Havana	Embassy	Countries: Dominican Republic	
Mexico	Mexico City	Embassy	Countries: Guatemala; Honduras; Nicaragua	
United States	Washington, D.C.	Embassy	Countries: Jamaica	
United States	Houston	Consulate-General	Countries: Jamaica	
United States	Los Angeles	Consulate-General	Countries: Jamaica	
United States	New York City	Consulate-General	Countries: Jamaica	
Venezuela	Caracas	Embassy	Countries: Colombia; Panama; Trinidad and Tobago	

=== Asia ===
Host country	Host city	Mission	Concurrent accreditation	Ref.
Armenia	Yerevan	Embassy	Countries: Georgia	
Azerbaijan	Baku	Embassy		
Bahrain	Manama	Embassy		
Bangladesh	Dhaka	Embassy		
Bhutan	Thimphu	Embassy		
Brunei	Bandar Seri Begawan	Embassy		
China	Beijing	Embassy		
China	Hong Kong	Consulate-General		
China	Guangzhou	Consulate-General		
China	Shanghai	Consulate-General		
India	New Delhi	Embassy	Countries: Nepal	
India	Mumbai	Consulate-General	Countries: Nepal	
Indonesia	Jakarta	Embassy	Countries: Timor-Leste	
Iran	Tehran	Embassy	Countries: Turkmenistan	
Iraq	Baghdad	Embassy		
Iraq	Basra	Consulate-General		
Iraq	Erbil	Consulate-General		
Japan	Tokyo	Embassy		
Jordan	Amman	Embassy	Countries: Palestine	
Kazakhstan	Astana	Embassy	Countries: Kyrgyzstan	
Lebanon	Beirut	Embassy		
Malaysia	Kuala Lumpur	Embassy		
Mongolia	Ulaanbaatar	Embassy		
Oman	Muscat	Embassy		
Pakistan	Islamabad	Embassy		
Pakistan	Karachi	Consulate-General		
Philippines	Manila	Embassy		
Qatar	Doha	Embassy		
Saudi Arabia	Riyadh	Embassy		
Saudi Arabia	Jeddah	Consulate-General		
Singapore	Singapore	Embassy		
South Korea	Seoul	Embassy		
Sri Lanka	Colombo	Embassy	Countries: Maldives	
Syria	Damascus	Embassy		
Tajikistan	Dushanbe	Embassy		
Thailand	Bangkok	Embassy		
Turkey	Ankara	Embassy		
Turkey	Istanbul	Consulate-General		
United Arab Emirates	Abu Dhabi	Embassy		
United Arab Emirates	Dubai	Consulate-General		
Uzbekistan	Tashkent	Embassy	Countries: Afghanistan	
Vietnam	Hanoi	Embassy		
Yemen	Aden (Note: Originally located in Sana'a, the embassy was relocated to Aden due to the fall of Sana'a in 2014 in the midst of the Yemeni civil war.)	Embassy		

=== Europe ===
Host country	Host city	Mission	Concurrent accreditation	Ref.
Albania	Tirana	Embassy	Countries: Kosovo	
Austria	Vienna	Embassy	Countries: Slovenia	
Belgium	Brussels	Embassy	Countries: Luxembourg; Multilateral Organizations: European Union	
Bosnia and Herzegovina	Sarajevo	Embassy		
Bulgaria	Sofia	Embassy	Countries: North Macedonia	
Cyprus	Nicosia	Embassy		
Czechia	Prague	Embassy	Countries: Croatia	
France	Paris	Embassy	Countries: Monaco	
Germany	Berlin	Embassy	Countries: Estonia; Latvia; Lithuania	
Germany	Frankfurt	Consulate-General	Countries: Estonia; Latvia; Lithuania	
Greece	Athens	Embassy		
Hungary	Budapest	Embassy		
Ireland	Dublin	Embassy	Countries: Iceland	
Italy	Rome	Embassy	Countries: San Marino	
Italy	Milan	Consulate-General	Countries: San Marino	
Malta	Valletta (Note: Although officially titled as an embassy in Valletta, its chancery is physically located in the nearby town of Balzan.)	Embassy		
Netherlands	The Hague	Embassy	Countries: Norway; Multilateral Organizations: Organisation for the Prohibition of Chemical Weapons	
Poland	Warsaw	Embassy		
Portugal	Lisbon	Embassy		
Romania	Bucharest	Embassy	Countries: Moldova	
Russia	Moscow	Embassy	Countries: Belarus	
Serbia	Belgrade	Embassy	Countries: Montenegro	
Slovakia	Bratislava	Embassy		
Spain	Madrid	Embassy	Countries: Andorra	
Sweden	Stockholm	Embassy	Countries: Denmark; Finland	
Switzerland	Bern	Embassy	Countries: Holy See; Liechtenstein	
Switzerland	Geneva	Consulate-General	Countries: Holy See; Liechtenstein	
Ukraine	Kyiv	Embassy		
United Kingdom	London	Embassy		

=== Oceania ===
Host country	Host city	Mission	Concurrent accreditation	Ref.
Australia	Canberra	Embassy	Countries: Papua New Guinea	
New Zealand	Wellington	Embassy	Countries: Cook Islands; Fiji	

=== Multilateral organisations ===
Organization	Host city	Host country	Mission	Concurrent accreditation	Ref.
Arab League	Cairo	Egypt	Permanent Delegation		
United Nations	New York City	United States	Permanent Mission	Countries: Bahamas	
United Nations	Geneva	Switzerland	Permanent Mission		

- Paris (Permanent Delegation to UNESCO)

== Gallery ==
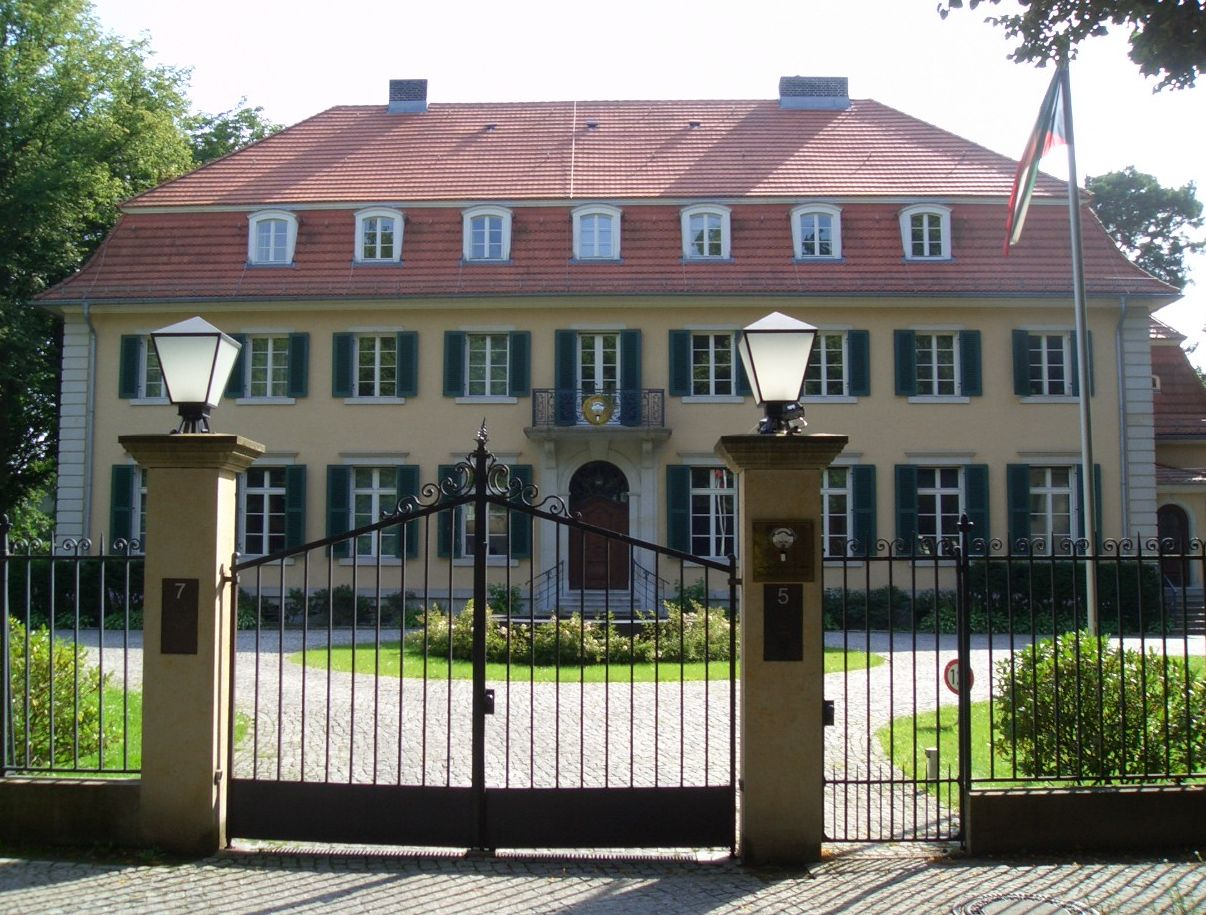
Embassy in Berlin

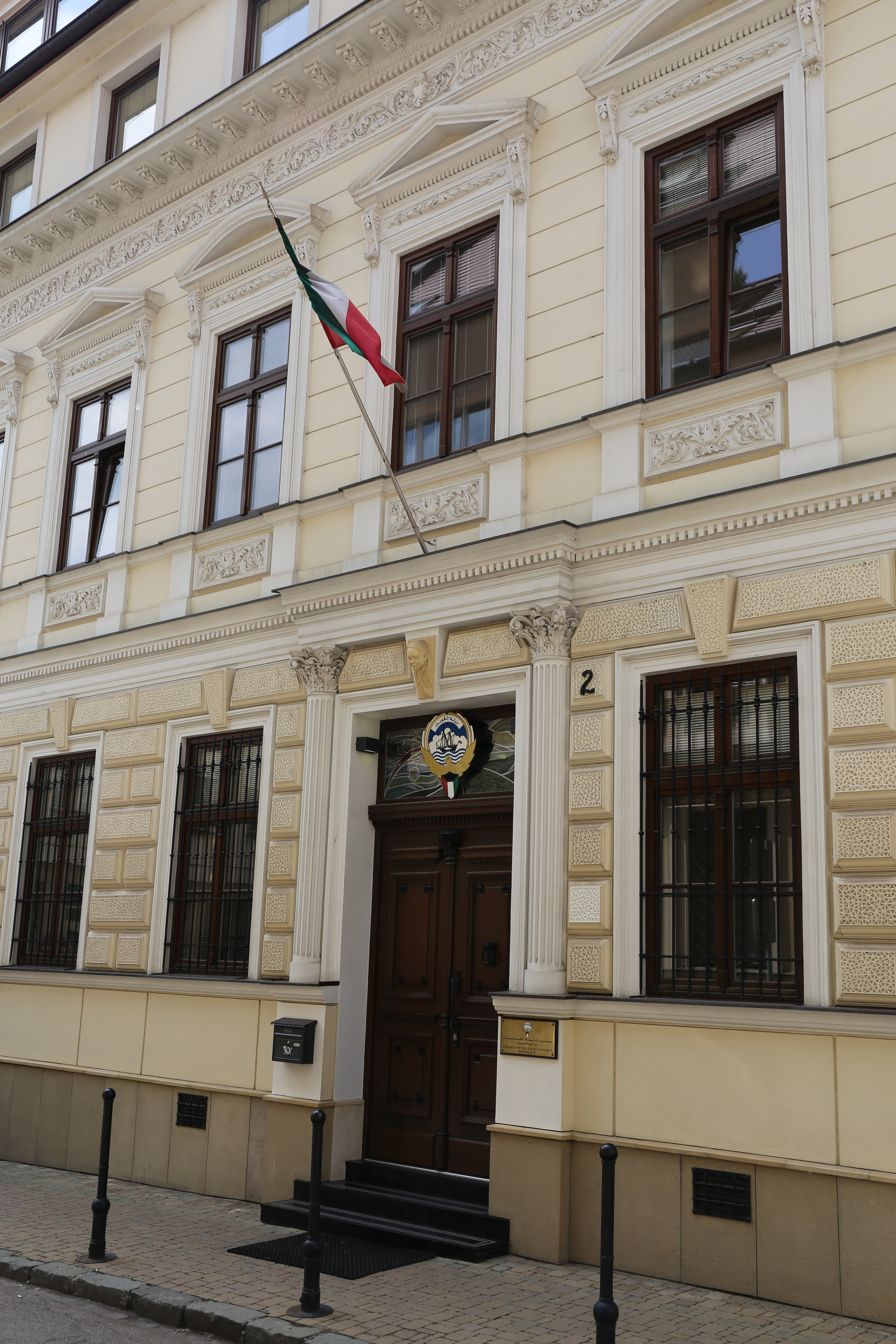
Embassy in Bratislava

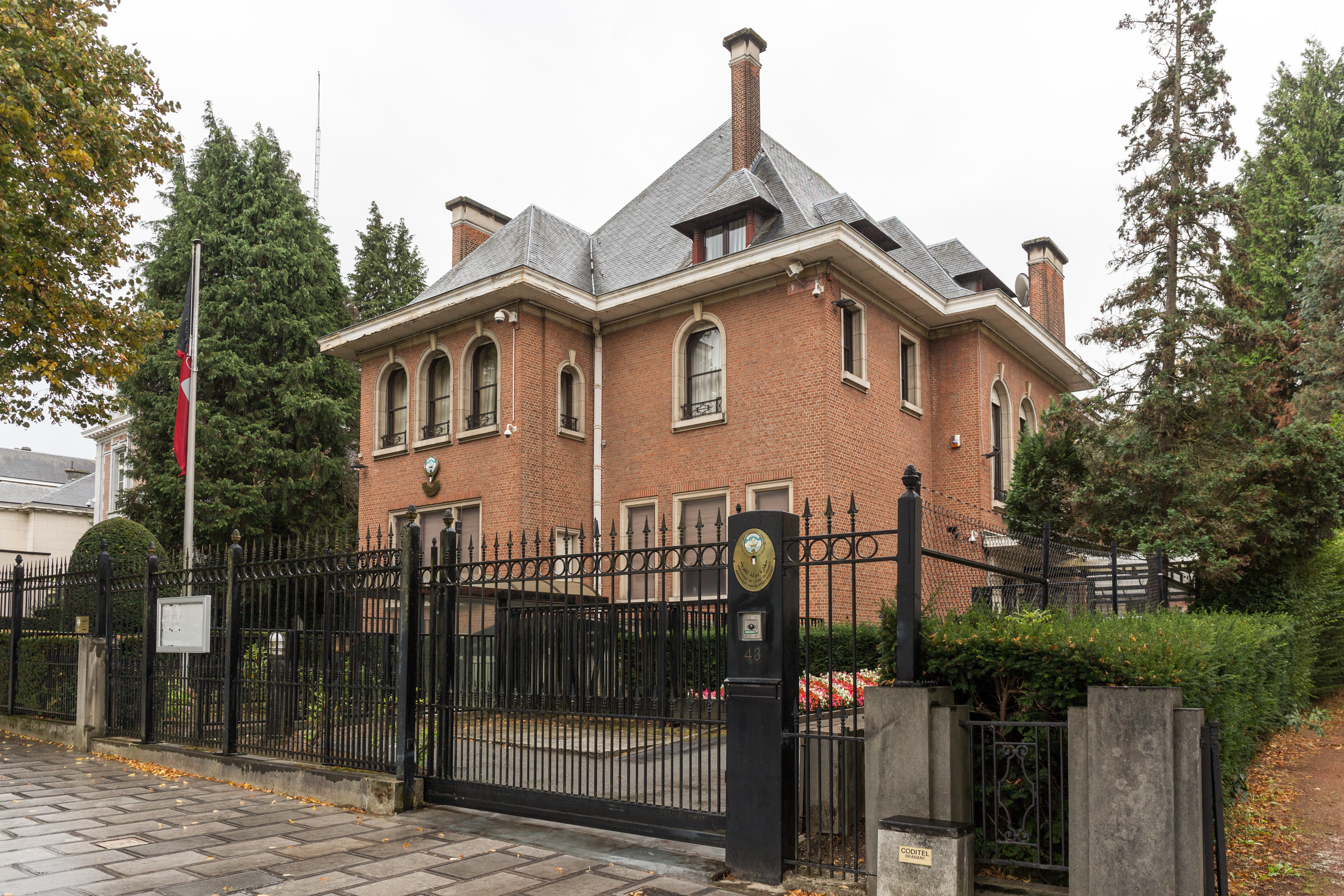
Embassy in Brussels

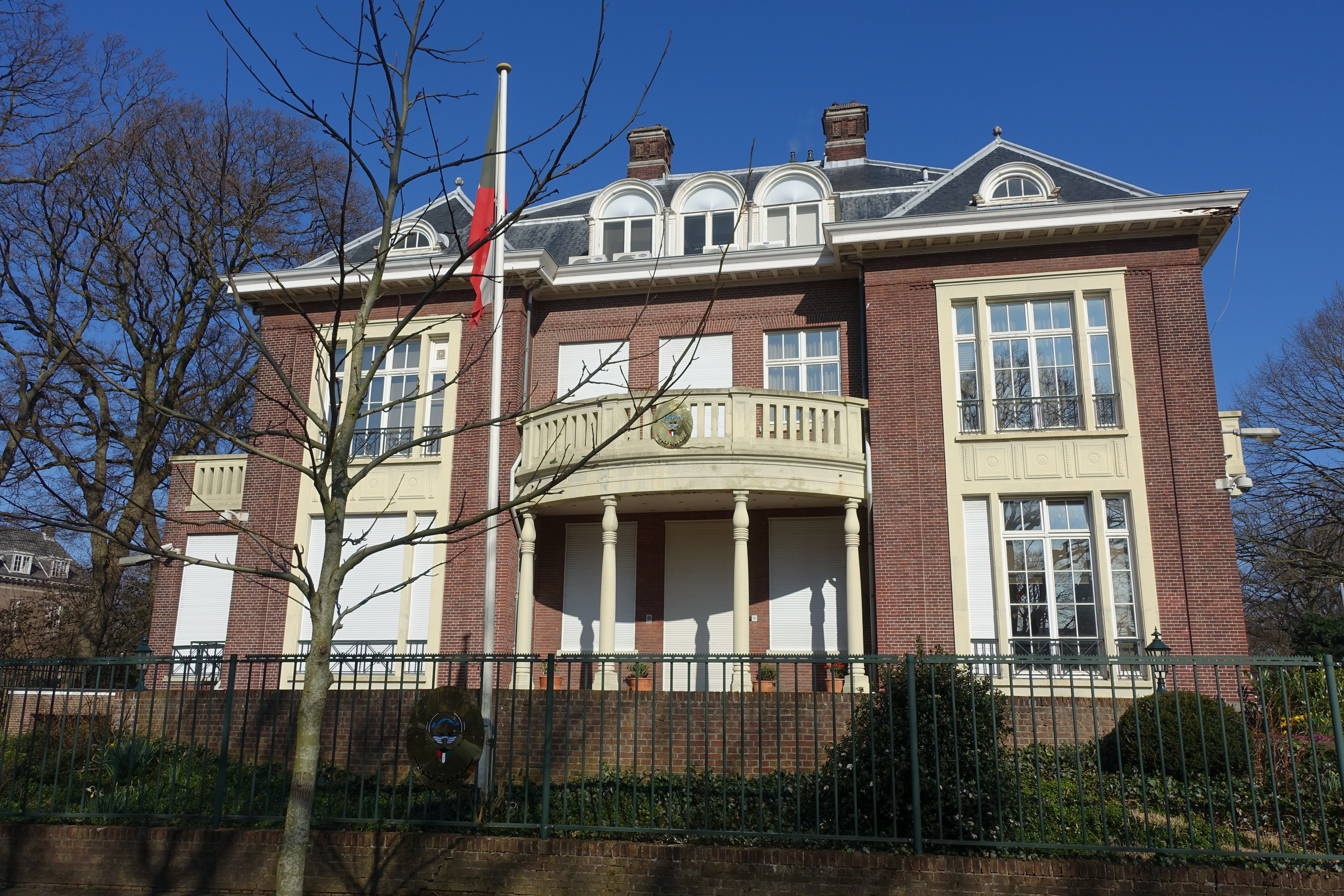
Embassy in The Hague

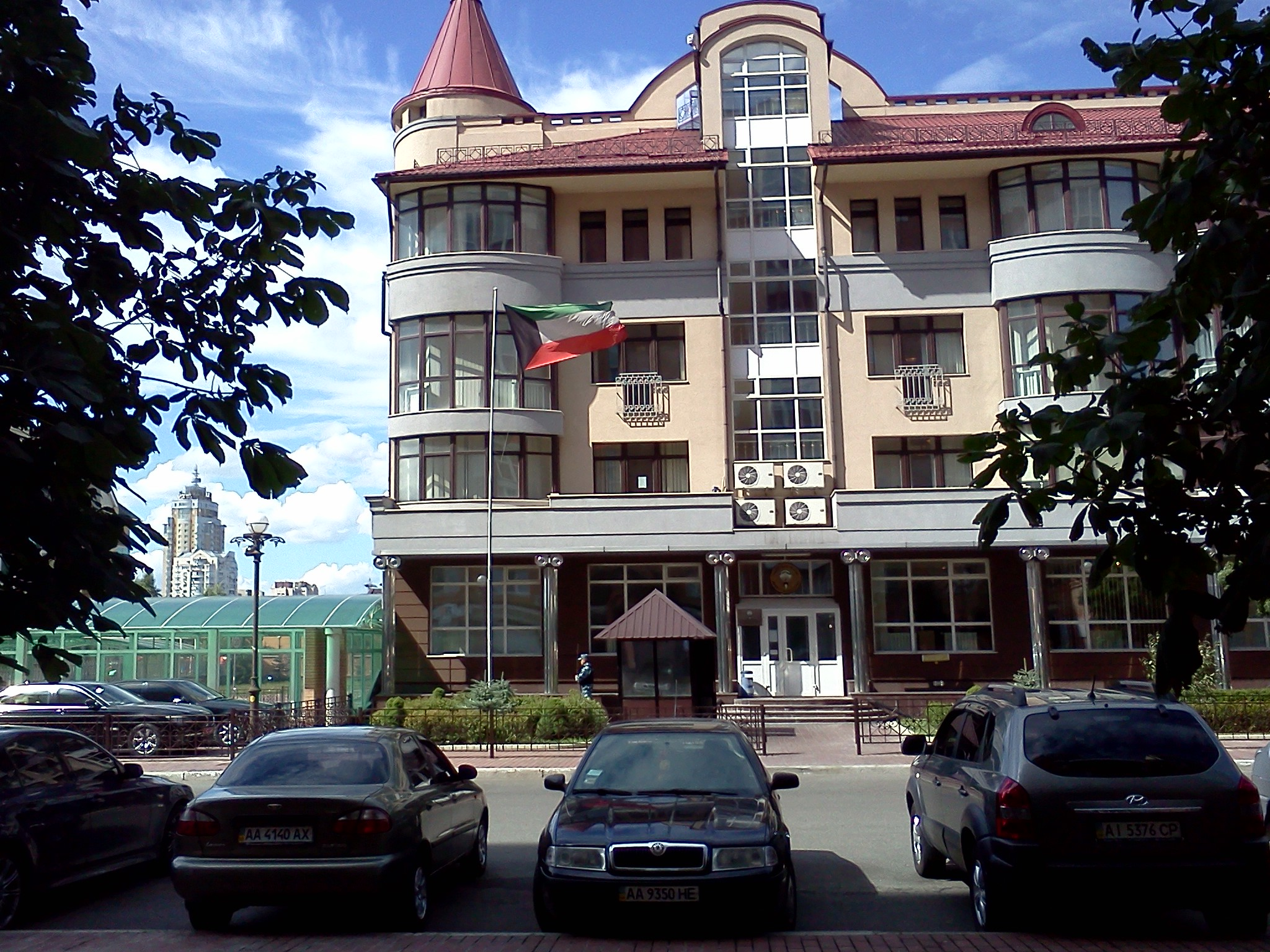
Embassy in Kyiv

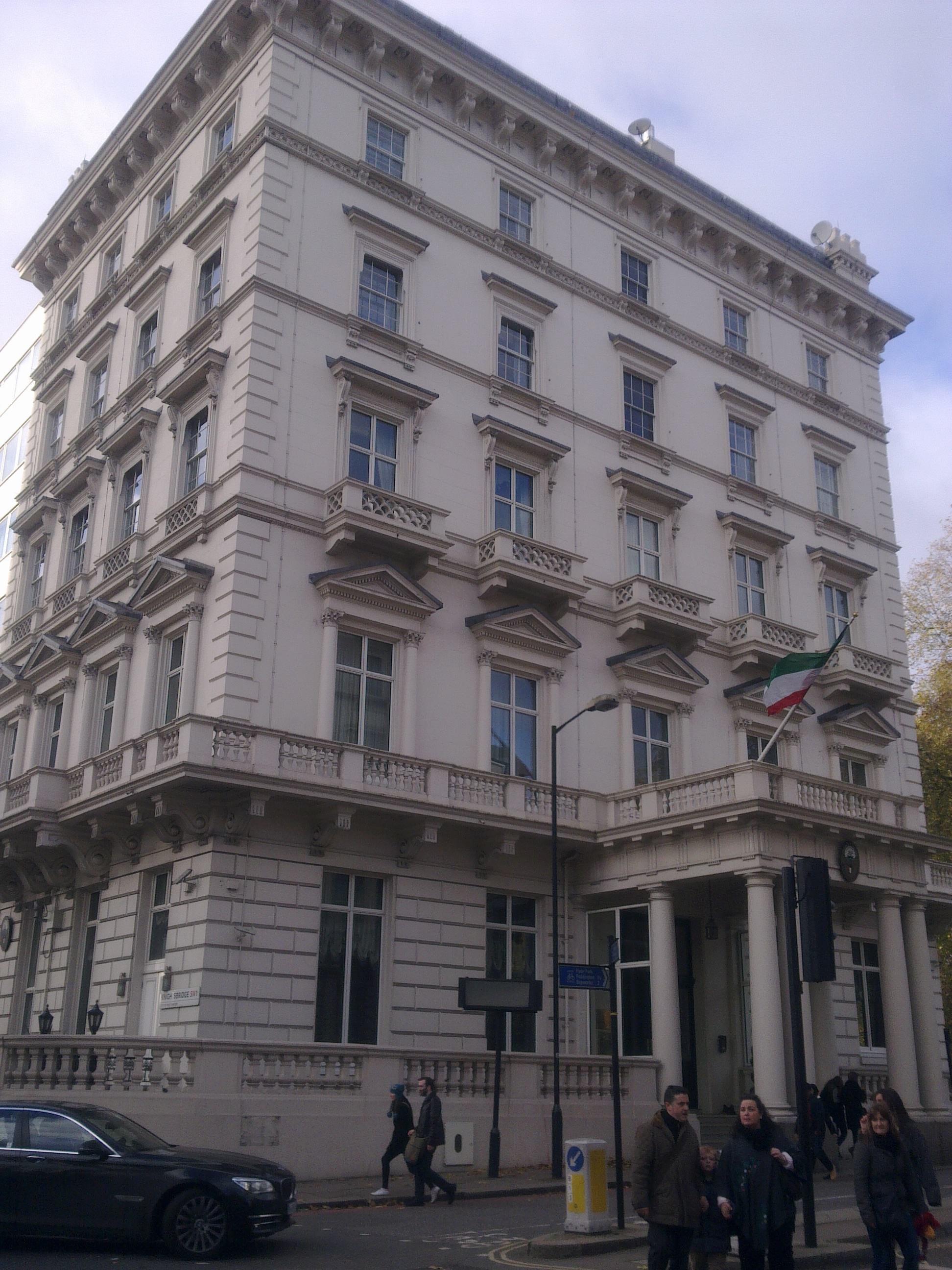
Embassy in London

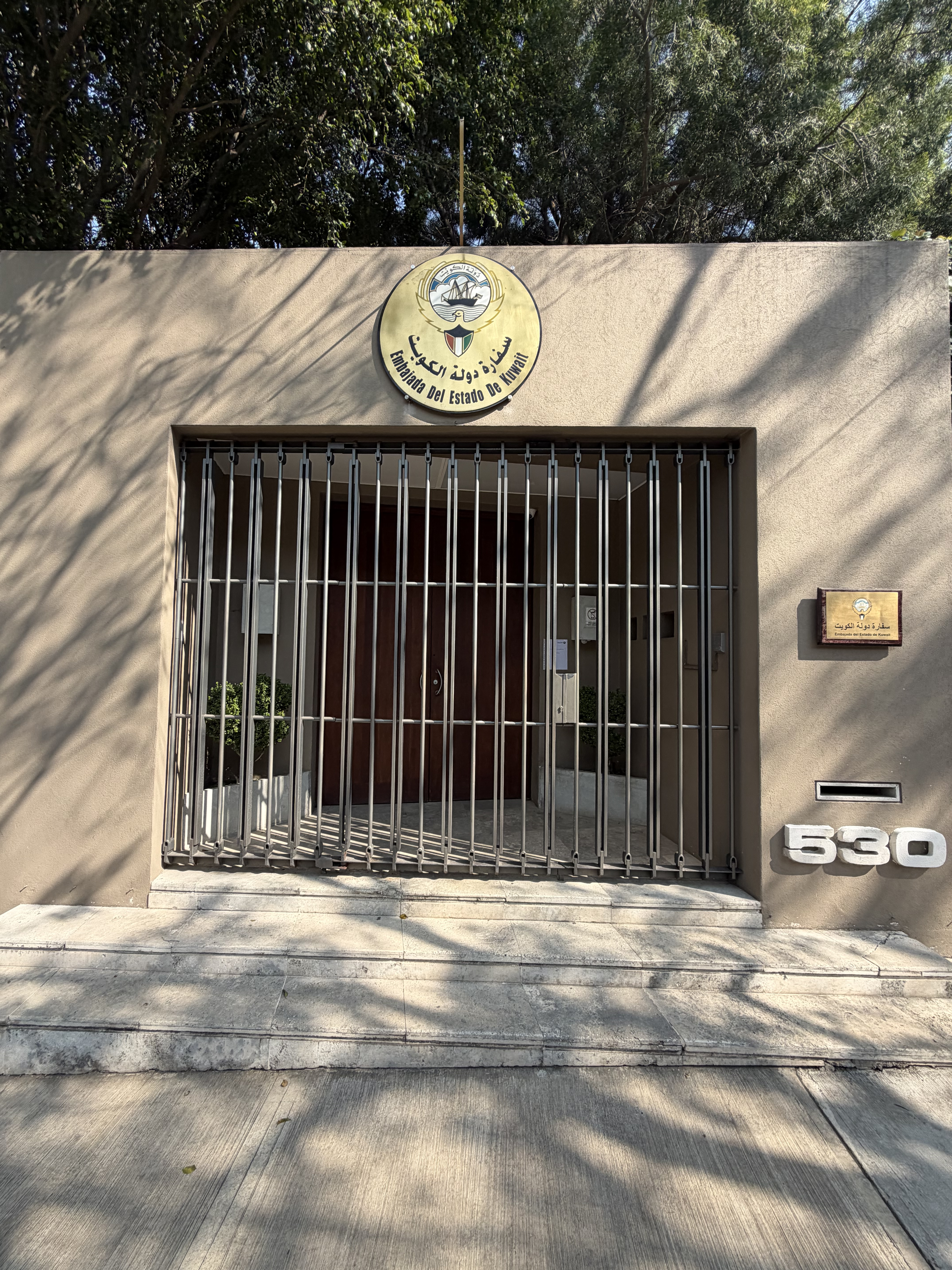
Embassy in Mexico City

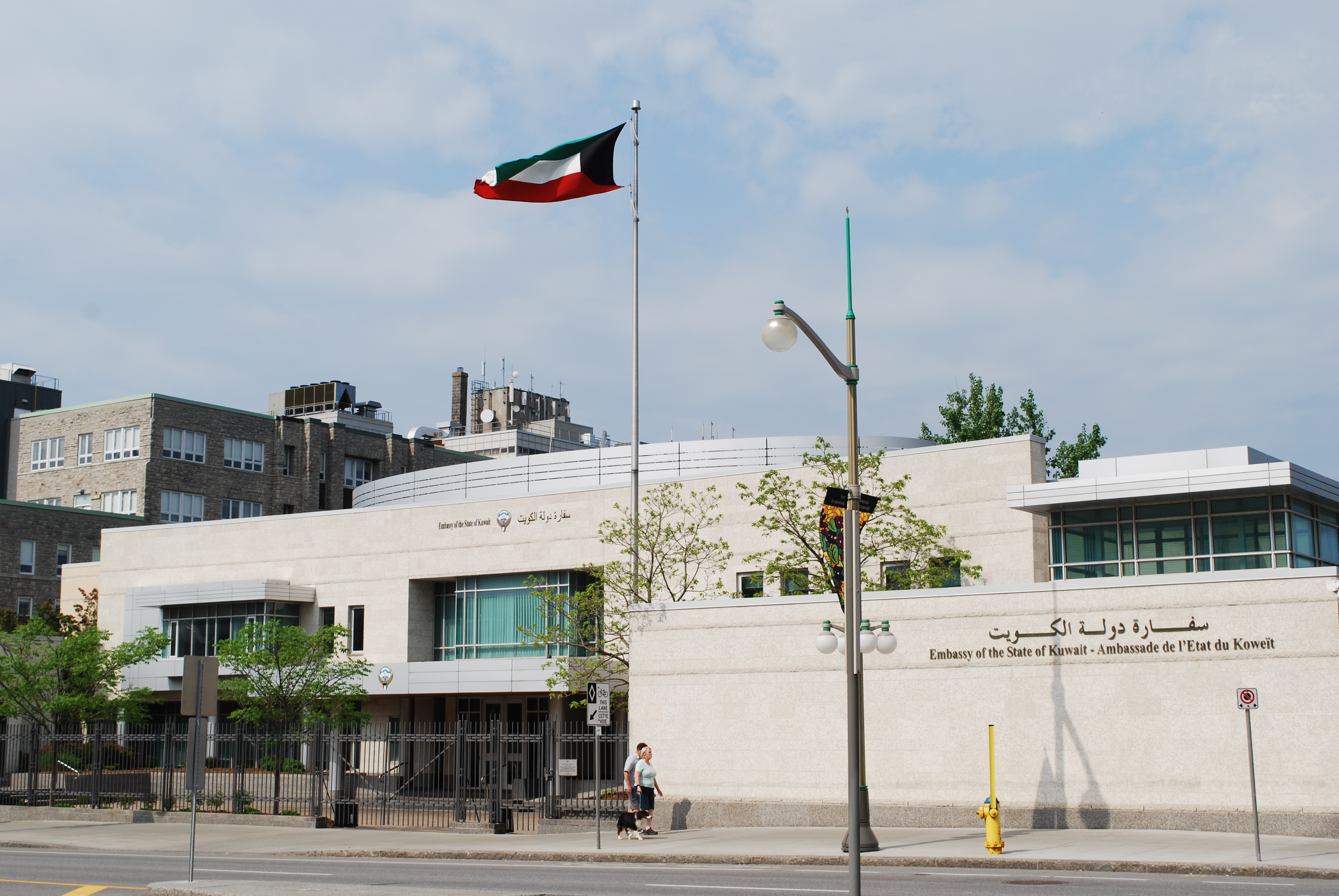
Embassy in Ottawa

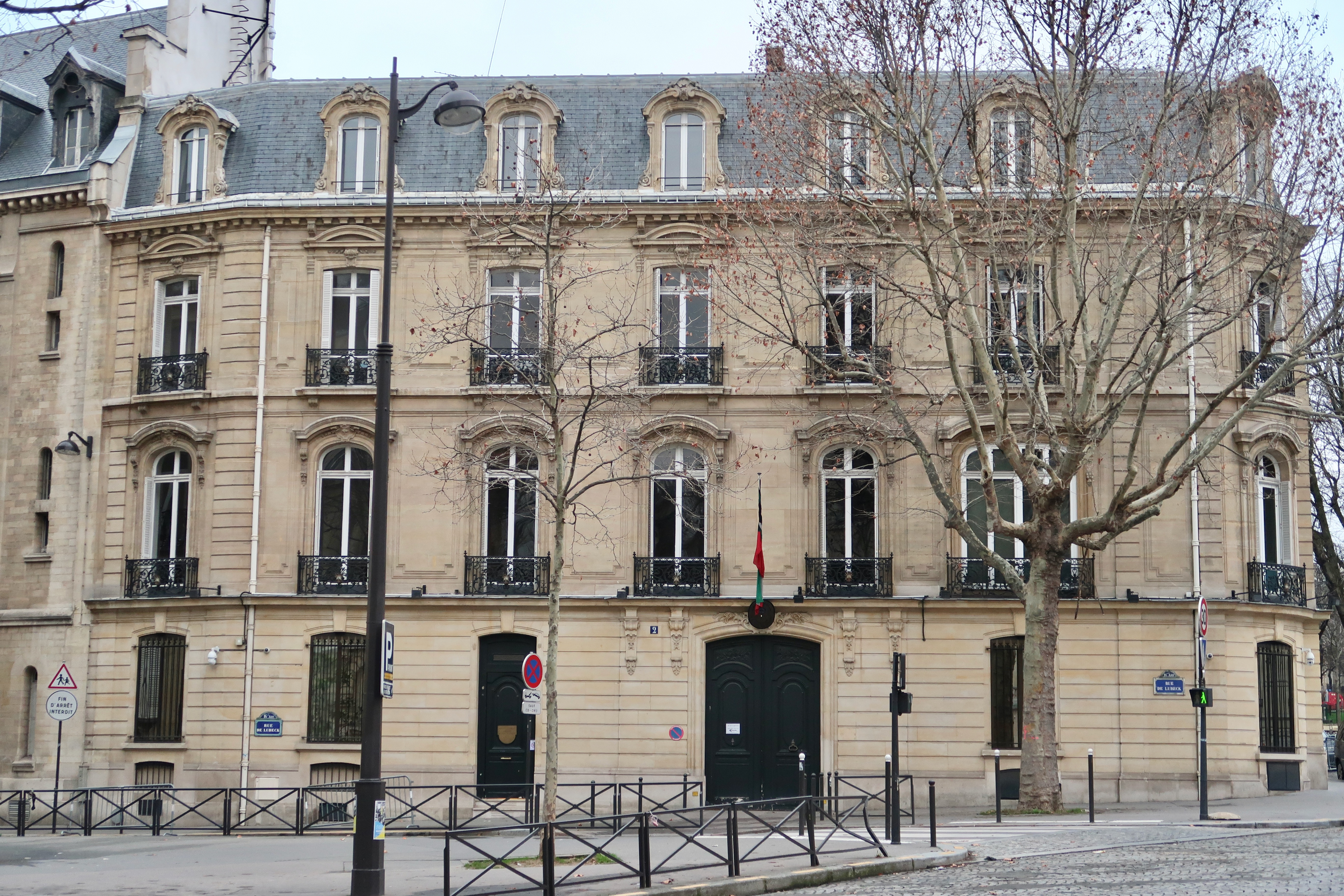
Embassy in Paris

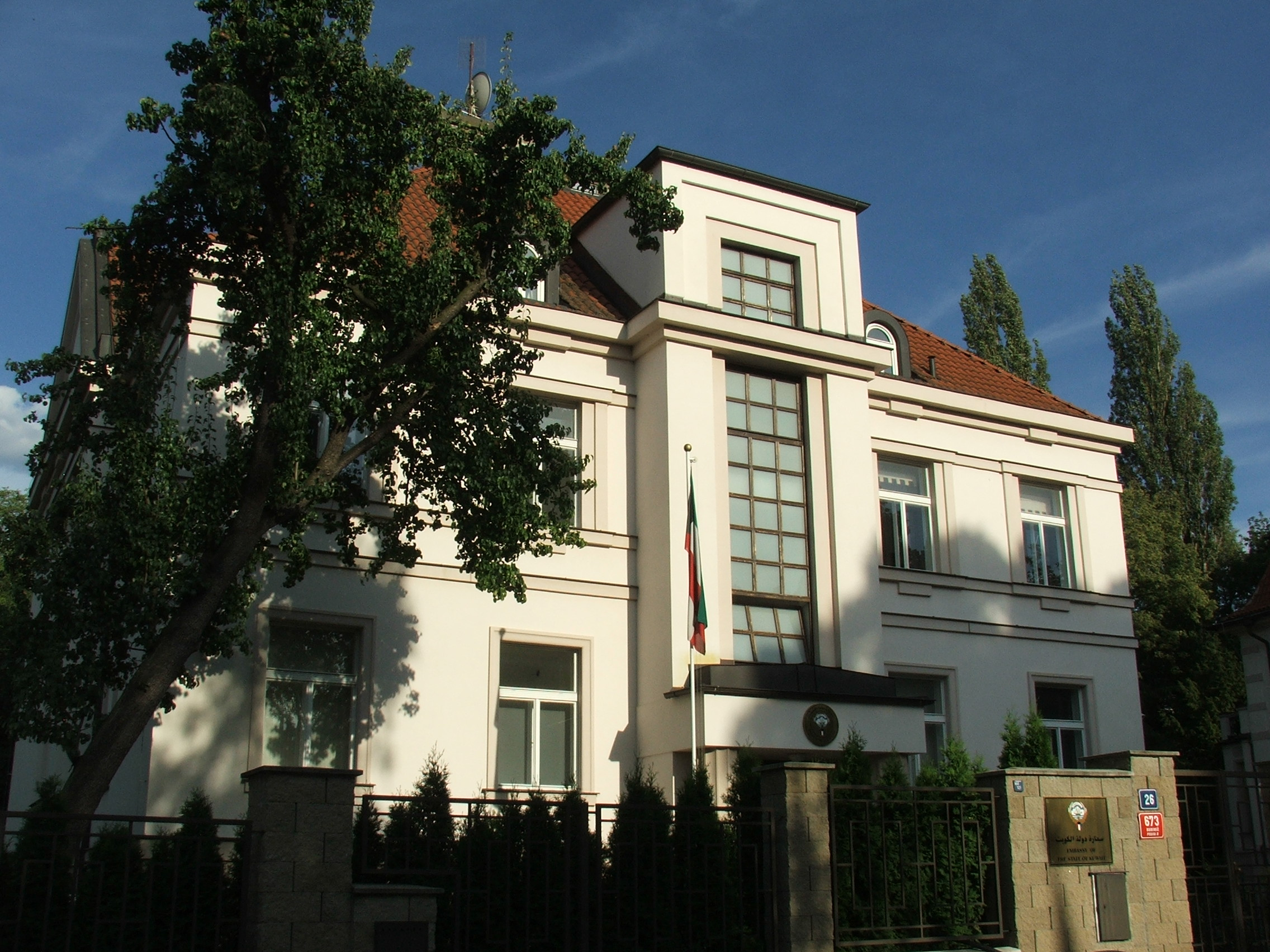
Embassy in Prague

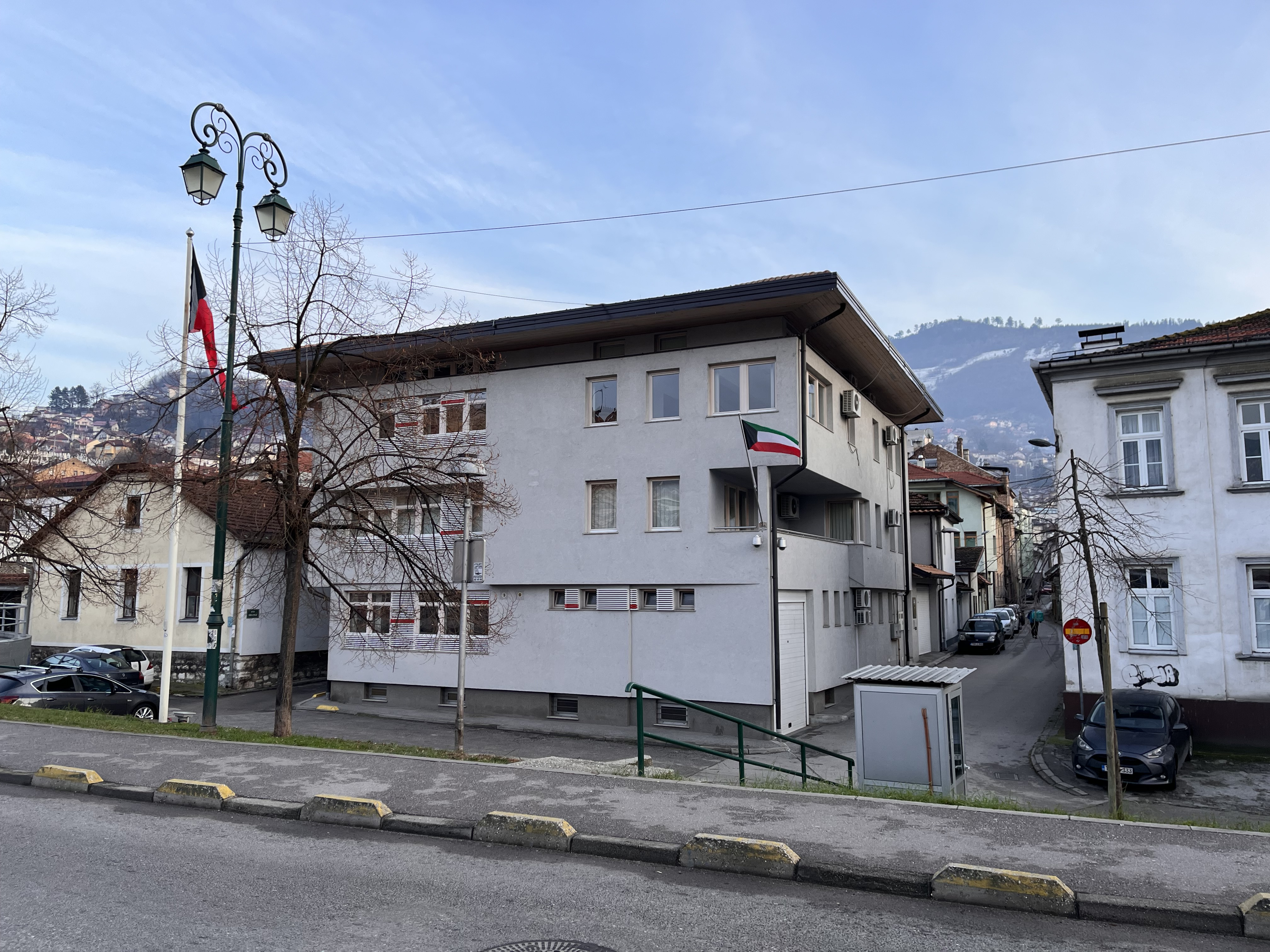
Embassy in Sarajevo

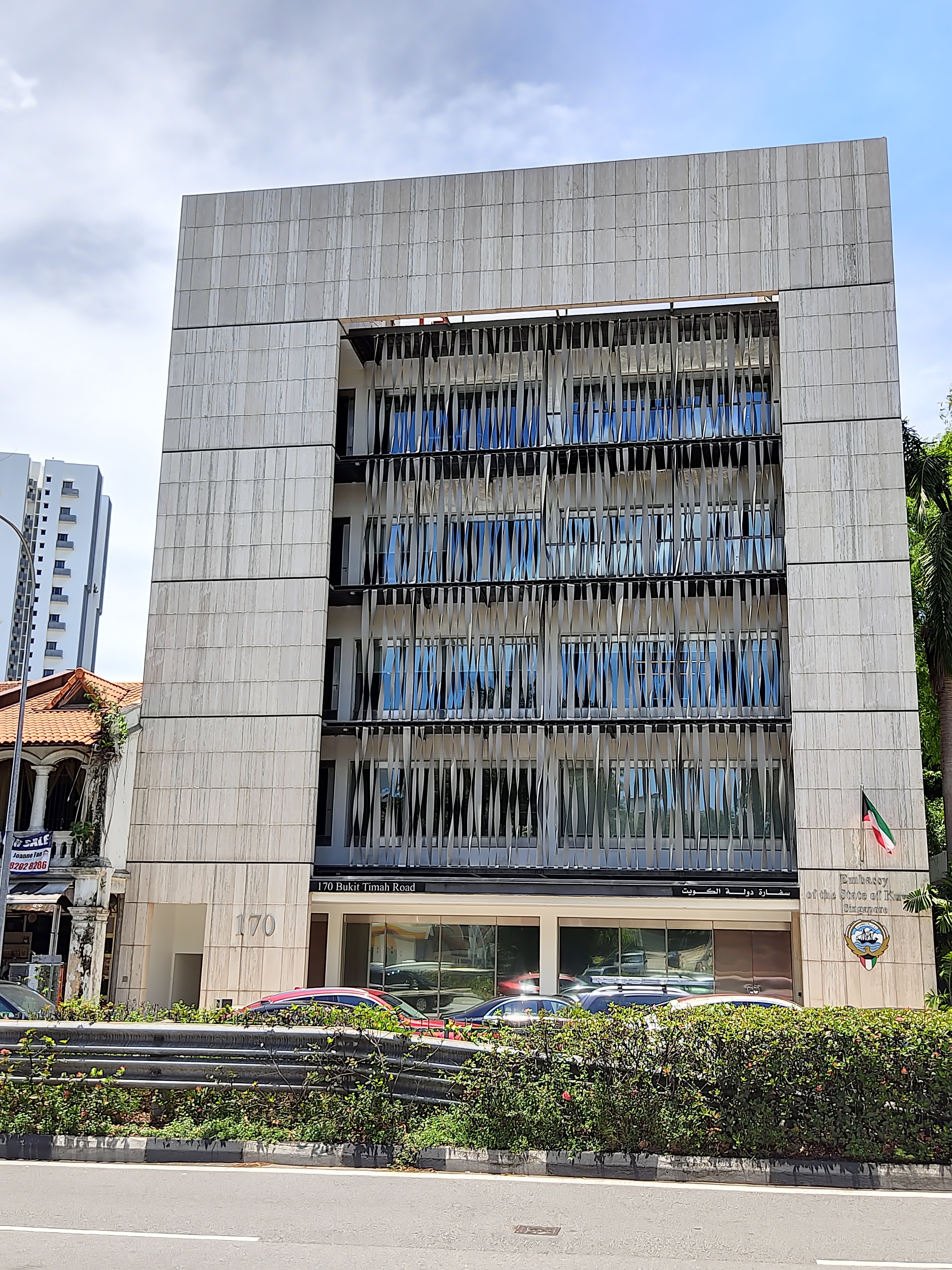
Embassy in Singapore

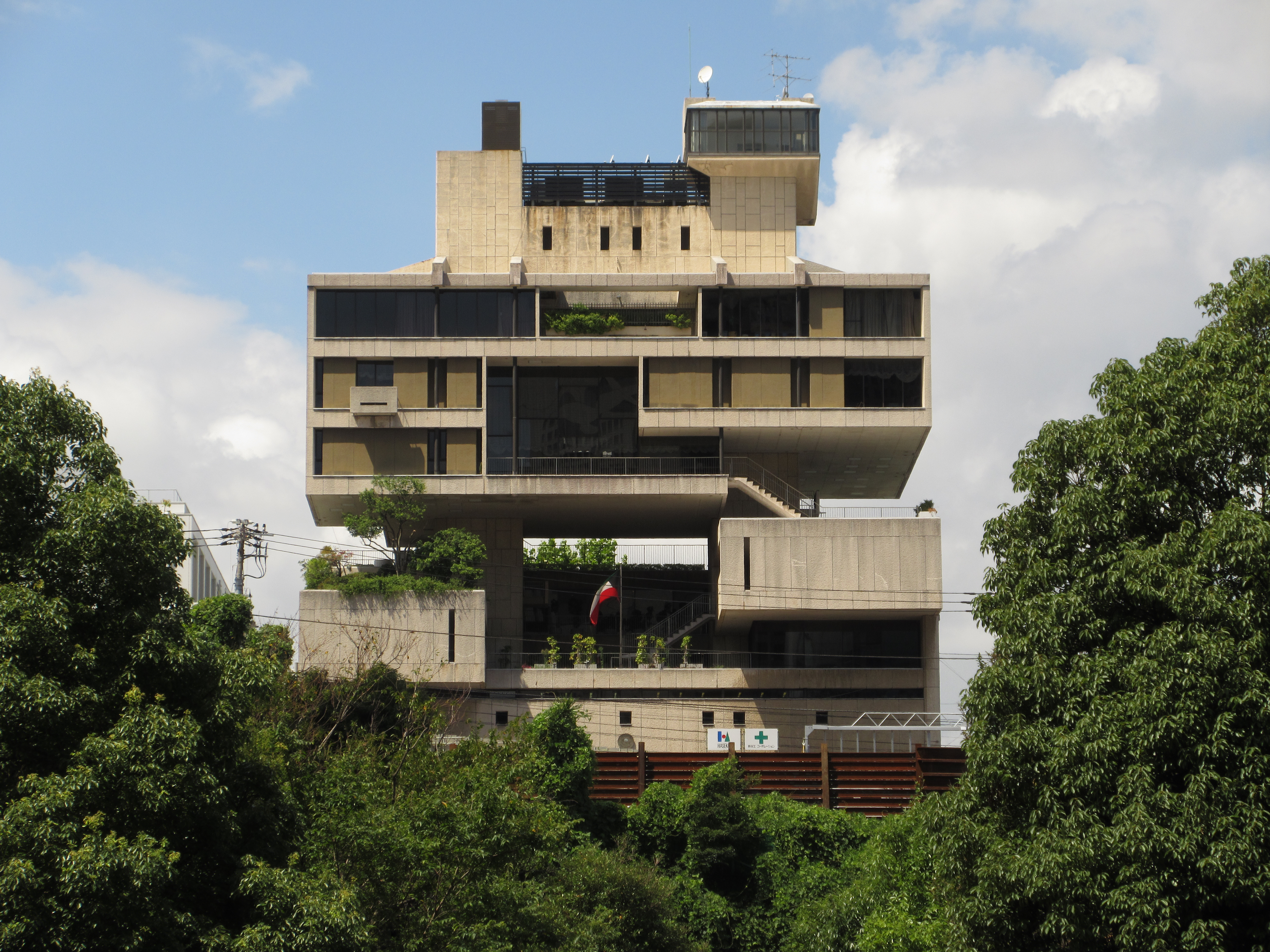
Embassy in Tokyo

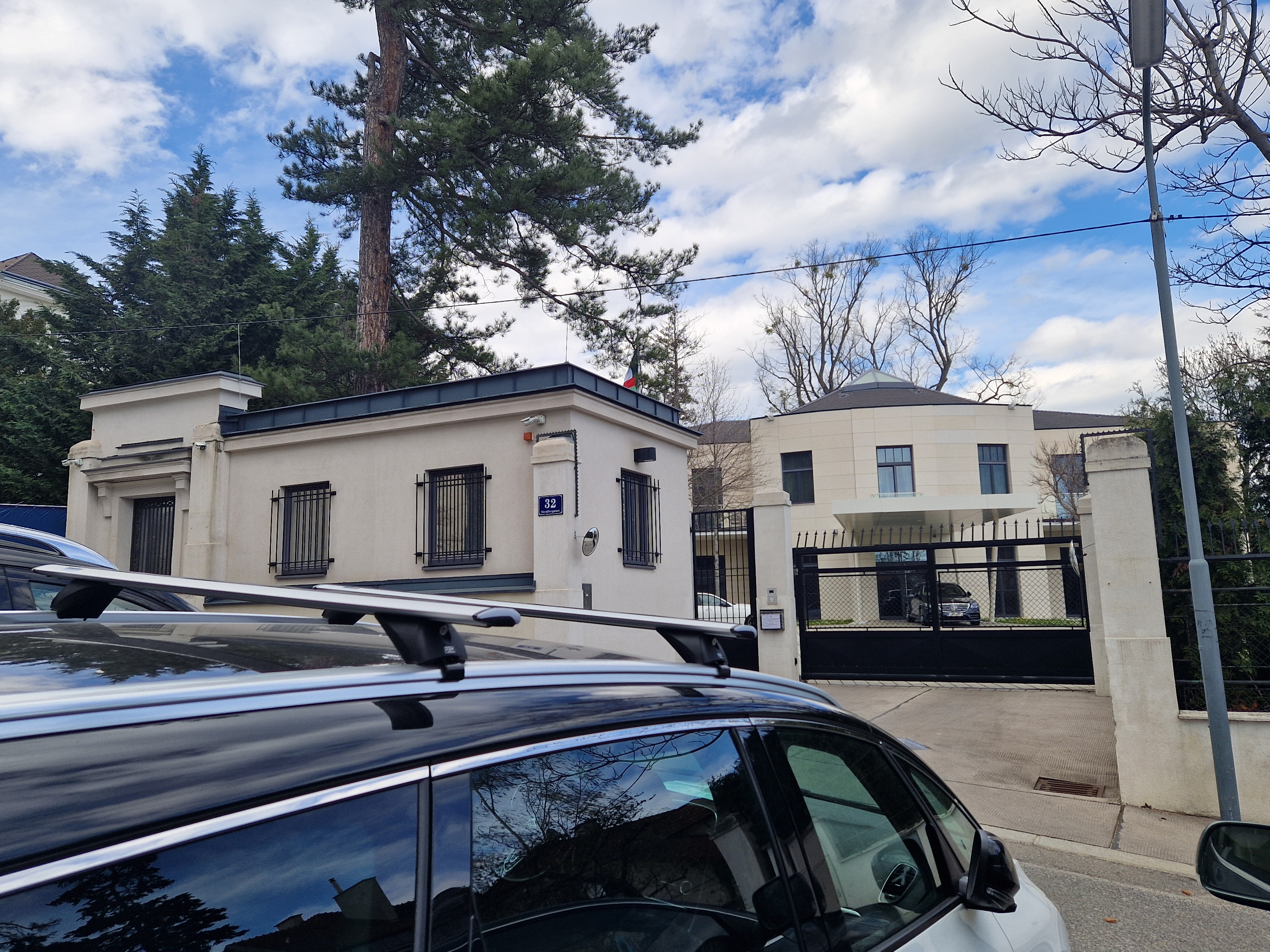
Embassy in Vienna

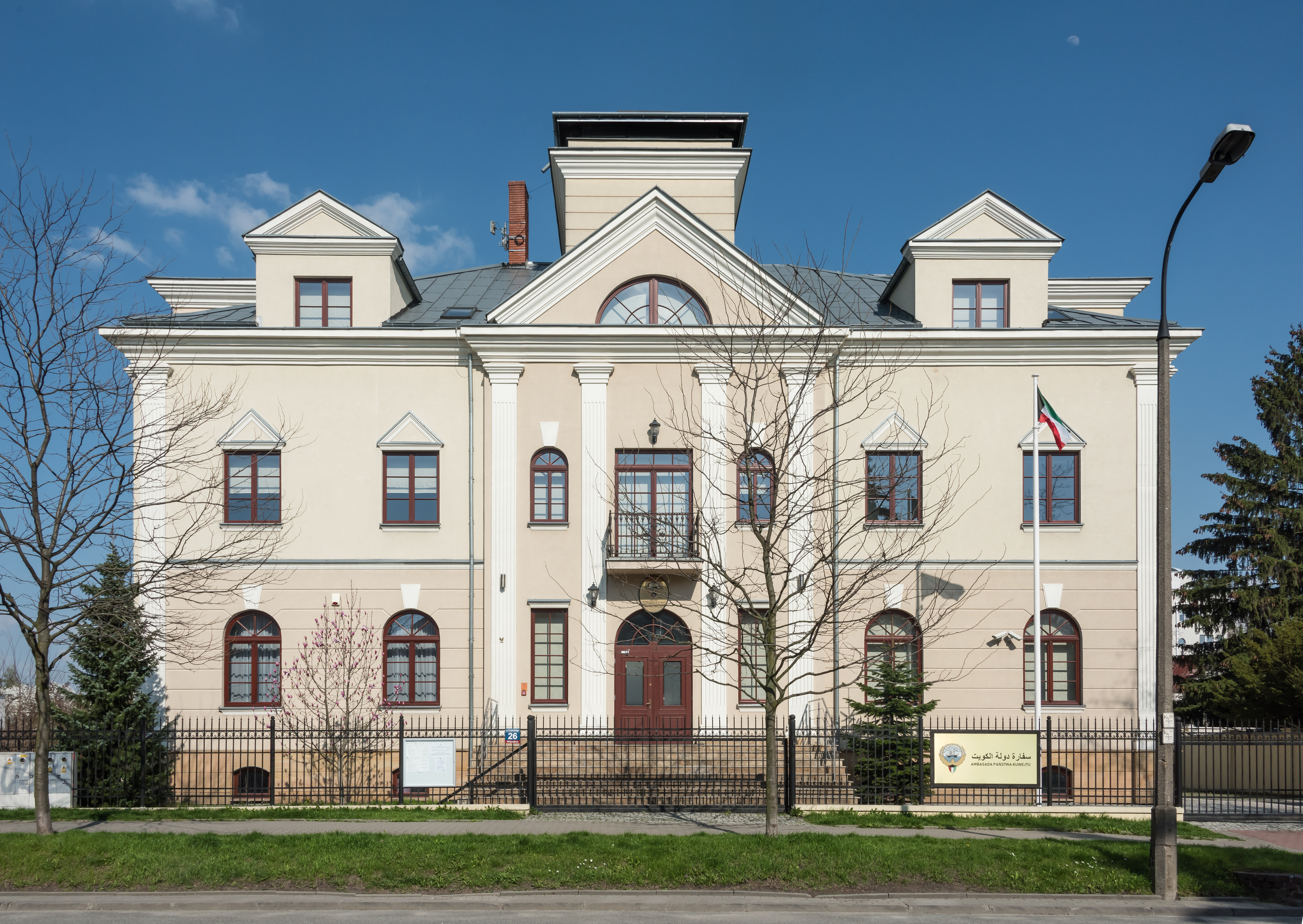
Embassy in Warsaw

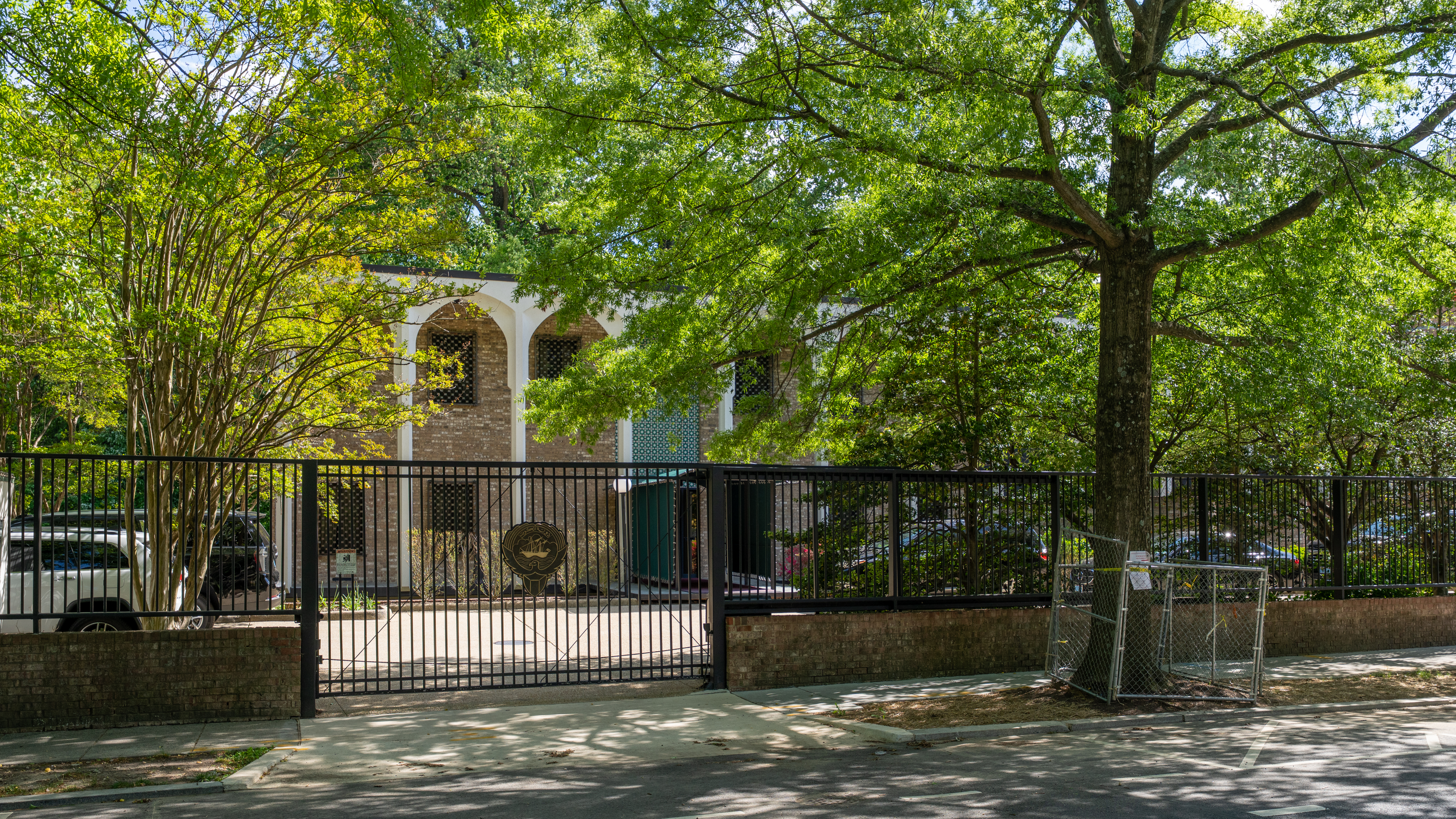
Embassy in Washington, D.C.

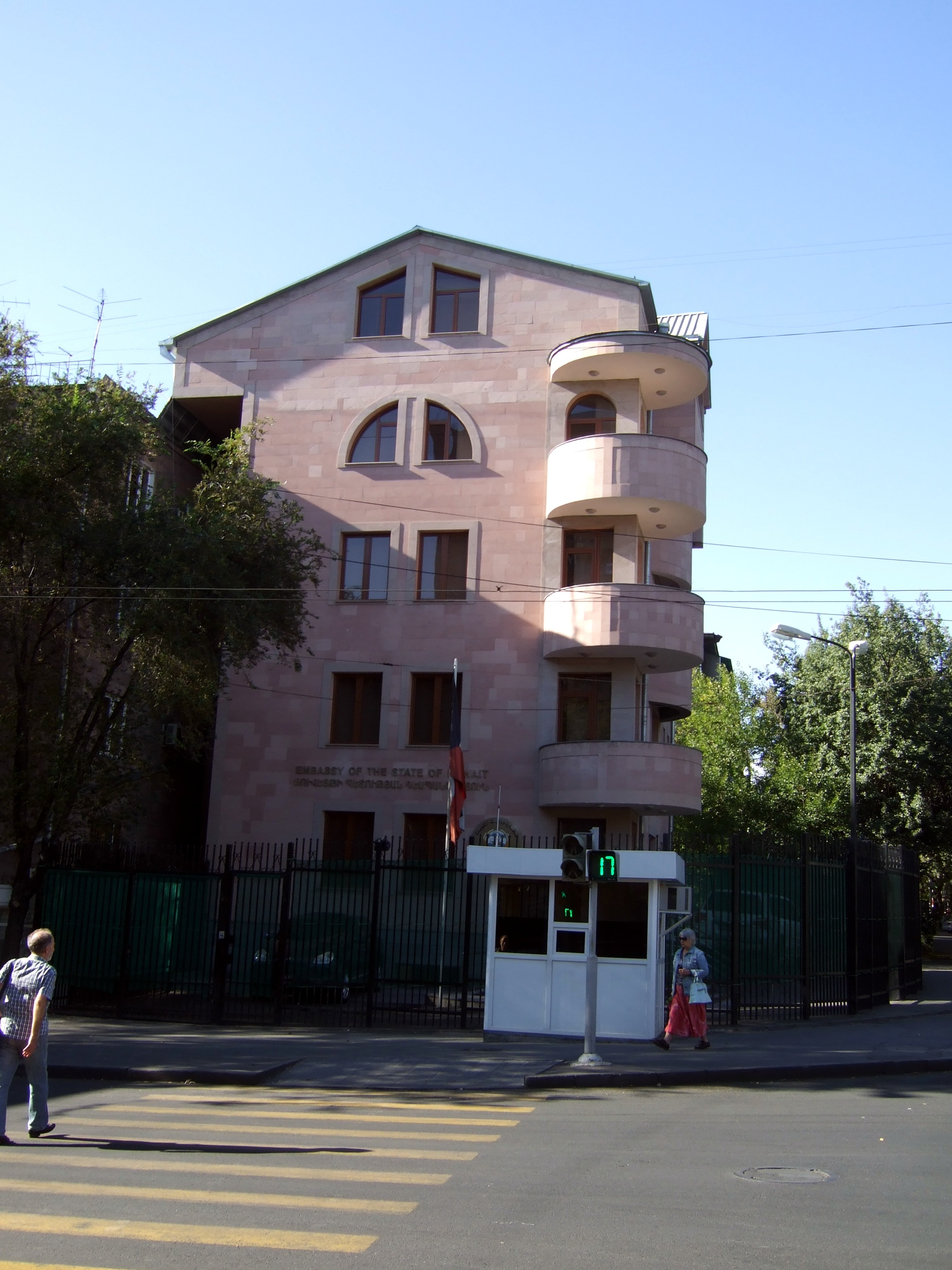
Embassy in Yerevan

== Closed missions ==
=== Africa ===
Host country	Host city	Mission	Year closed	Ref.
Gabon	Libreville	Embassy	2024	
Zimbabwe	Harare	Embassy	2024	

=== Americas ===
Host country	Host city	Mission	Year closed	Ref.
Chile	Santiago de Chile	Embassy	2024	

=== Asia ===
Host country	Host city	Mission	Year closed	Ref.
Cambodia	Phnom Penh	Embassy	2024	
Laos	Vientiane	Embassy	2024	
Myanmar	Yangon	Embassy	2024	
Vietnam	Ho Chi Minh City	Consulate-General	2024	

== See also ==
- Foreign relations of Kuwait
- List of diplomatic missions in Kuwait
- Visa policy of Kuwait
