= List of ambassadors of Kuwait to the United States =

Ambassador of Kuwait to the United States Embassy of Kuwait in Washington, D.C.
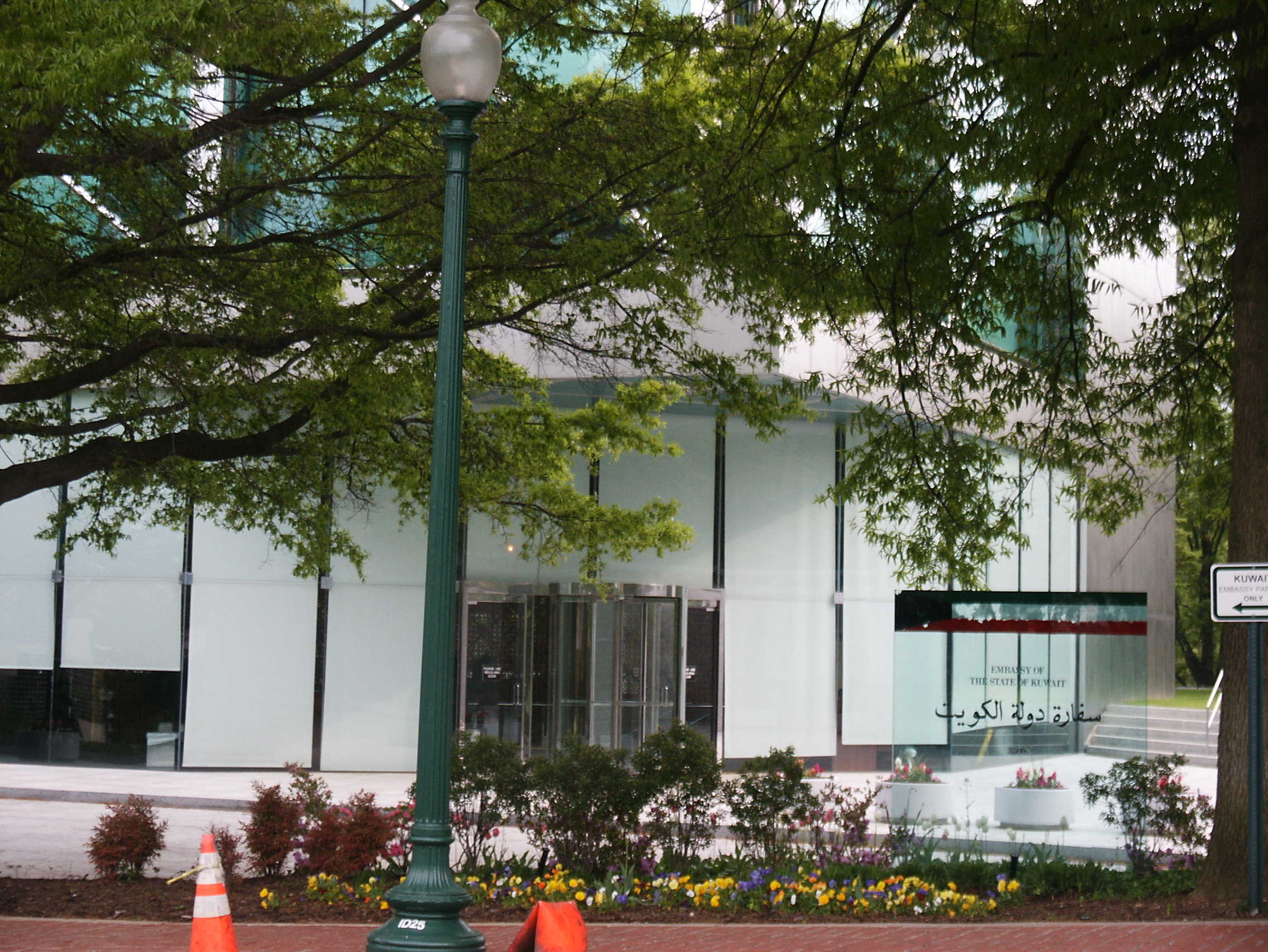
- Incumbent; Shaikha Al-Zain Sabah Al-Naser Al-Sabah since March 12, 2023
- Inaugural holder: Talat Yaqoub
- Formation: May 7, 1962

The Kuwaiti ambassador in Washington, D. C. is the official representative of the Government in Kuwait City to the Government of the United States.

== List of representatives ==
Diplomatic agrément	Diplomatic accreditation	Ambassador	Observations	List of emirs of Kuwait	List of presidents of the United States	Term end
May 7, 1962			Embassy opened	Abdullah Al-Salim Al-Sabah	John F. Kennedy	
May 7, 1962		Talat Yaqoub	Chargé d'affaires	Abdullah Al-Salim Al-Sabah	John F. Kennedy	
May 14, 1962	June 1, 1962	Abdul Rahman Salim al-Atiqi		Abdullah Al-Salim Al-Sabah	John F. Kennedy	
September 16, 1963	October 15, 1963	Talat Al-Ghoussein		Abdullah Al-Salim Al-Sabah	Lyndon B. Johnson	
March 22, 1971	April 27, 1971	Salem Sabah Al-Salem Al-Sabah		Sabah Al-Salim Al-Sabah	Richard Nixon	
March 19, 1975		Jamil Al-Hassani	Chargé d'affaires	Sabah Al-Salim Al-Sabah	Gerald Ford	
July 9, 1975	July 14, 1975	Khalid Muhammad Jaffar		Sabah Al-Salim Al-Sabah	Gerald Ford	
November 18, 1980		Jamil Al-Hassani	Chargé d'affaires	Jaber Al-Ahmad Al-Sabah	Jimmy Carter	
February 6, 1981	February 24, 1981	Saud Nasser Al-Saud Al-Sabah		Jaber Al-Ahmad Al-Sabah	Ronald Reagan, George H. W. Bush	1992
January 15, 1993	April 14, 1993	Mohammad Sabah Al-Salem Al-Sabah		Jaber Al-Ahmad Al-Sabah	Bill Clinton, George W. Bush	February 2001
September 5, 2001	October 10, 2001	Salem Abdullah Al-Jaber Al-Sabah	Became Minister of Foreign Affairs 2022–2024	Jaber Al-Ahmad Al-Sabah, Sabah Al-Ahmad Al-Jaber Al-Sabah, Nawaf Al-Ahmad Al-Jaber Al-Sabah	George W. Bush, Barack Obama, Donald Trump, Joe Biden	May 2022
June 23, 2022	August 12, 2022	Jasem al-Budaiwi	Became Secretary General of the Gulf Cooperation Council	Nawaf Al-Ahmad Al-Jaber Al-Sabah	Joe Biden	2023
March 12, 2023	April 19, 2023	Al-Zain Al-Sabah		Nawaf Al-Ahmad Al-Jaber Al-Sabah, Mishal Al-Ahmad Al-Jaber Al-Sabah	Joe Biden, Donald Trump	
