= Visa requirements for Kuwaiti citizens =

Administrative entry restrictions

Visa requirements for Kuwaiti citizens are administrative entry restrictions by the authorities of other states placed on citizens of Kuwait. As of 2026, Kuwaiti citizens had visa-free or visa on arrival access to 96 countries and territories, ranking the Kuwaiti passport 47th in terms of travel freedom according to the Henley Passport Index.

Kuwaiti citizens do not need a visa to enter other member states of the GCC.

== Visa requirements map ==
Visa requirements for Kuwaiti citizens Kuwait Freedom of movement Visa not required / Electronic Travel Authorisation Visa on arrival eVisa Visa available both on arrival or online Visa required

== Visa requirements ==
Country	Visa requirement	Allowed stay	Notes (excluding departure fees)
Afghanistan	eVisa		Visa is not required in case born in Afghanistan or can proof that one of their parents is a national of Afghanistan or born in Afghanistan.; e-Visa : Visitors must arrive at Kabul International (KBL).
Albania	Visa not required	90 days	
Algeria	Visa required		
Andorra	Visa not required		Although no visa requirements exist, apply the relevant regulations of France or Spain, whichever must be transited to reach Andorra.
Angola	eVisa		
Antigua and Barbuda	visa not required	30 days	Kuwaiti citizens with a visa or residency issued by Canada, USA, United Kingdom or a Schengen Member State can obtain a visa upon arrival that costs USD100 for a maximum of 30 days.
Argentina	AVE		The AVE (High Speed Travel) is open to Kuwait citizens holding valid, current ordinary passports traveling to Argentina for tourism. To do so, they must hold a valid category B2/J/B1/O/P (P1-P2-P3)/E/H-1B visa issued by the United States of America
Armenia	Visa not required	180 days	
Australia	Online Visa required		May apply online (Online Visitor e600 visa).
Austria	Visa required		
Azerbaijan	Visa not required	30 days	eVisa also available.
Bahamas	Visa not required	3 months	
Bahrain	Visa not required	Freedom of movement; ID card valid	
Bangladesh	Visa on arrival	30 days	
Barbados	Visa not required		
Belarus	Visa not required	30 days	Must arrive and depart via Minsk International Airport.
Belgium	Visa required		
Belize	Visa required		No visa required for holders of a valid multiple entry visa or Permanent Residence Card from the USA, multiple entry Schengen visa, multiple entry visa or Permanent Residence Card from Canada.
Benin	eVisa	30 days	Must have an international vaccination certificate.
Bhutan	eVisa		Visa fee is USD 40 per person and visa application may be processed within 5 business days with duration of stay of 90 days.; e-Visa applicant is also subject to pay Sustainable Development Fee
Bolivia	Online Visa required	90 days	
Bosnia and Herzegovina	Visa not required	90 days	90 days within any 6-month period
Botswana	Visa not required	90 days	
Brazil	Visa required		
Brunei	Visa on arrival	30 days	
Bulgaria	Visa required		
Burkina Faso	eVisa		
Burundi	Visa on arrival		Must hold an Entry Authorisation letter issued by the authorities of Burundi beforehand.
Cambodia	eVisa / Visa on arrival	30 days	
Cameroon	eVisa		
Canada	Visa required		
Cape Verde	Visa on arrival		Visa on arrival at Sal, Boa Vista, São Vicente or Santiago international airports.; Requirement to register online 5 days before arrival; Also pay the airport security fee of CVE 3400 either online or on arrival.
Central African Republic	Visa required		
Chad	eVisa		
Chile	eVisa		May apply visa online.
China	Visa not required	30 days	Visa not required to Hong Kong for 30 days; Visa on arrival for Macau; Visa free From June 9, 2025 to December 31, 2026.
Colombia	eVisa	90 days	Visa-free for holders of valid visa for Schengen area or the US
Comoros	Visa on arrival	45 days	
Republic of the Congo	Visa required		
Democratic Republic of the Congo	eVisa		
Costa Rica	Visa required		90 days visa free if hold a valid residence permit issued by the European Union member countries, Canada, Iceland, Norway, Switzerland, the United Kingdom or the United States and multiple-entry visa issued by Canada and the United States
Côte d'Ivoire	eVisa	3 months	eVisa holders must arrive via Port Bouet Airport.
Croatia	Visa required		
Cuba	eVisa		Tourist card can be purchased if holding valid visa of US, Canada, and Schengen member State
Cyprus	Visa required		
Czech Republic	Visa required		
Denmark	Visa required		
Djibouti	eVisa	31 days	
Dominica	Visa not required	21 days	
Dominican Republic	Visa not required	30 days	
Ecuador	Visa not required	90 days	
Egypt	Visa not required	6 months	
El Salvador	Visa not required	90 days	
Equatorial Guinea	eVisa		
Eritrea	Visa required		Pre-arranged visa can be picked up on arrival.
Estonia	Visa required		
Eswatini	Visa not required	30 days	
Ethiopia	eVisa / Visa on arrival	up to 90 days	Visa on arrival is obtainable only at Addis Ababa Bole International Airport.; e-Visa holders must arrive via Addis Ababa Bole International Airport.; e-Visa is available for 30 or 90 days.
Fiji	Online Visa required		
Finland	Visa required		
France	Visa required		
Gabon	eVisa		Electronic visa holders must arrive via Libreville International Airport.
Gambia	Visa required		
Georgia	Visa not required	1 year	
Germany	Visa required		
Ghana	eVisa		Pre-approved visa can be picked up on arrival.
Greece	Visa required		
Grenada	Visa required		
Guatemala	Visa not required	90 days	
Guinea	eVisa		
Guinea-Bissau	eVisa / Visa on arrival	90 days	
Guyana	Visa not required		
Haiti	Visa not required	3 months	
Honduras	Visa not required	90 days	
Hungary	Visa required		
Iceland	Visa required		
India	eVisa	30 days	e-Visa holders must arrive via 32 designated airports (Note: Ahmedabad; Amritsar; Bagdogra; Bengaluru; Bhubaneswar; Chandigarh; Chennai; Coimbatore; Delhi; Gaya; Goa-Dabolim; Goa-Manohar; Guwahati; Hyderabad; Indore; Jaipur; Kannur; Kochi; Kolkata; Kozhikode; Lucknow; Madurai; Mangaluru; Mumbai; Nagpur; Port Blair; Pune; Surat; Thiruvananthapuram; Tiruchirappalli; Varanasi; Visakhapatnam) or 5 designated seaports. (Note: Chennai; Cochin; Mormugao; Mumbai; Mangalore); An Indian e-Tourist Visa may only be obtained twice within 1 calendar year.; Foreigners of Pakistani origin or who hold a Pakistani Passport are not eligible for an e-Visa. Foreigners who are not Pakistani nationals, but whose parents or grandparents (either paternal or maternal) were born in, or were permanent residents in Pakistan, are also not eligible for an e-Visa.
Indonesia	e-VOA / Visa on arrival	30 days	
Iran	Visa not required	15 days	
Iraq	eVisa		Visa on arrival when arriving at Al Najaf International Airport, Erbil International Airport or Sulaimaniyah International Airport or Basra International Airport.
Ireland	Online Visa required		Visa is issued free of charge; Visa not required if a passenger first enters the United Kingdom with an ETA or a visitor visa issued by the United Kingdom. They are visa exempt for a maximum stay of 90 days in Ireland or until the end of the period of stay granted in the United Kingdom.
Israel	Visa required		Confirmation from Israeli Foreign Ministry is required before a visa is issued.
Italy	Visa required		
Jamaica	Visa required		
Japan	Visa required		Eligible for an e-Visa if residing in one these countries Australia, Brazil, Cambodia, Canada, India, Saudi Arabia, Singapore, South Africa, Taiwan, United Arab Emirates, United Kingdom, United States.; May apply online
Jordan	Visa not required	3 months	
Kazakhstan	Visa not required	30 days	
Kenya	Electronic Travel Authorisation	3 months	Electronic Travel Authorisation (eTA); Applications can be submitted up to 90 days prior to travel and must be submitted at least 3 days in advance.; eTA fee is USD 32.50.; eTA is good for single entry, but visitors who leave Kenya to other EAC countries may re-enter provided that their eTA is still valid; Proof of reservation at the hotel where visitors plan to stay is required (if staying with friends, an invitation letter is also acceptable).; Yellow fever vaccination certificate is required if coming from endemic countries.; Can also be entered on an East Africa tourist visa issued by Rwanda or Uganda.
Kiribati	Visa required		
North Korea	Visa required		
South Korea	Electronic Travel Authorization	30 days	Travelers must be in possession of a Korea Electronic Travel Authorization (K-ETA) to enter Korea visa-free, which can be completed up to 24 hours before boarding a flight, The validity period of a K-ETA is 3 years from the date of approval.
Kyrgyzstan	Visa not required	60 days	
Laos	eVisa / Visa on arrival	30 days	18 (Note: Savannakhet Airport; Lanetoui - Mengkang (China); Meuangmom - Wan Pong (Myanmar); Banvang - Ban Khok Phai (Thailand); Namngeun - Huay Kon (Thailand); Paksan - Bueng Kan (Thailand); Paktaphan - Pak Saeng (Thailand); Pangmon - Ban Huak (Thailand); Phoudou (Thailand); Dak ta ock - Nam Giang (Vietnam); La Lai (Vietnam); Namkan (Vietnam); Namphao - Cau Treo (Vietnam); Namsoy - Na Meo (Vietnam); Naphao - Cha Lo (Vietnam); Pahang - Long Sap (Vietnam); Panghok - Tây Trang (Vietnam); Phoukeua - Bo Y (Vietnam)) of the 33 border crossings are only open to regular visa holders.; e-Visa may be used to enter Laos through the Luang Prabang, Pakse and Vientiane international airports, 3 Thai-Lao Friendship Bridges (Note: Vientiane (Friendship Bridge 1); Savannakhet (Friendship Bridge 2); Bokeo (Friendship Bridge 4)), in Boten (road and railroad), and in Vientiane (at Khamsavath railway station).; Visa on arrival is available at the Luang Prabang, Pakse and Vientiane international airports, 4 Thai-Lao Friendship Bridges (Note: Vientiane (Friendship Bridge 1); Savannakhet (Friendship Bridge 2); Khammouane (Friendship Bridge 3); Bokeo (Friendship Bridge 4)) and 7 border crossings. (Note: Nongnokkheane - Trapeang Kriel (Cambodia); Boten - Bo han (China); Golden Triangle/Samliemkham (Thailand); Khamsavath railway station (Thailand); Namheuang - Ban Na Kraseng (Thailand); Vang tao - Chongmek (Thailand); Dansavan - Lao Bảo (Vietnam))
Latvia	Visa required		Diplomatic, service, and special passport holders may enter Latvia without a visa and stay in its territory for a period of up to 90 days in any 180-day period, in accordance with bilateral treaties.
Lebanon	Visa not required	6 months	
Lesotho	eVisa		evisa is suspended
Liberia	Visa required		
Libya	eVisa		
Liechtenstein	Visa not required(conditional)		
Lithuania	Visa required		
Luxembourg	Visa required		
Madagascar	eVisa / Visa on arrival	90 days	
Malawi	eVisa / Visa on arrival		
Malaysia	Visa not required	90 days	
Maldives	Free Visa on arrival	30 days	
Mali	Visa required		
Malta	Visa required		
Marshall Islands	Visa on arrival	90 days	
Mauritania	eVisa		Available at Nouakchott–Oumtounsy International Airport.
Mauritius	Visa not required	90 days	
Mexico	Visa required		May enter without a visa if obtaining a valid visa or a permanent residency to Canada, Japan, the United Kingdom, the United States, or the Schengen area.
Micronesia	Visa not required	30 days	
Moldova	eVisa		Visa free if hold a valid residence permit, a valid 'C'-type, or a valid 'D'-type visa issued by a Schengen member state
Monaco	Visa required		
Mongolia	eVisa / Visa on arrival	1 month	visa on arrival at Chinggis Khaan International Airport
Montenegro	Visa required	90 days	Visa not required for holders of a valid Australia, Japan, Canada, New Zealand, Ireland, US, UK or a Schengen Visa
Morocco	Visa not required	90 days	
Mozambique	eVisa / Visa on arrival	30 days	
Myanmar	eVisa	28 days	eVisa holders must arrive via Yangon, Nay Pyi Taw or Mandalay airports or via land border crossings with Thailand — Tachileik, Myawaddy and Kawthaung or India — Rih Khaw Dar and Tamu.; eVisa is available for tourism only.
Namibia	eVisa		
Nauru	Visa required		Pre-arranged visa can be picked up on arrival.
Nepal	eVisa / Visa on arrival	90 days	
Netherlands	Visa required		
New Zealand	Electronic Travel Authority	3 months	Kuwait article 17 passports are unacceptable, and visas will not be endorsed in them.; International Visitor Conservation and Tourism Levy must be paid upon requesting an Electronic Travel Authority.; Holders of an Australian Permanent Resident Visa or Resident Return Visa may be granted a New Zealand Resident Visa on arrival permitting indefinite stay (pursuant to the Trans-Tasman Travel Arrangement), subject to meeting character requirements and obtaining an Electronic Travel Authority prior to departure. Such travellers are not required to pay the International Visitor Conservation and Tourism Levy.
Nicaragua	Visa not required	90 days	
Niger	Visa required		Pre-arranged visa can be picked up on arrival.
Nigeria	eVisa		
North Macedonia	Visa required		You can stay 15 days without a Visa if you have Schengen visa.
Norway	Visa required		
Oman	Visa not required	Freedom of movement; ID card valid	
Pakistan	Visa not required	90 days	eVisa eligible.
Palau	Free Visa on arrival	30 days	
Panama	Visa not required	90 days	
Papua New Guinea	eVisa		May apply for an e-visa under the type of "Tourist - Own Itinerary".
Paraguay	Online Visa required		
Peru	Visa required		
Philippines	Visa not required	30 days	
Poland	Visa required		
Portugal	Visa required		
Qatar	Visa not required	Freedom of movement; ID card valid	
Romania	Visa required		
Russia	eVisa	30 days	e-Visa holders must arrive and departure via 29 checkpoints
Rwanda	eVisa / Visa on arrival	30 days	
Saint Kitts and Nevis	Electronic Travel Authorisation	3 months	
Saint Lucia	Visa not required	6 weeks	
Saint Vincent and the Grenadines	Visa not required	1 month	
Samoa	Visa on arrival	90 days	
San Marino	Visa not required		Same rules as for Italy. No border control but accessible only via Italy.
São Tomé and Príncipe	Visa not required	15 days	
Saudi Arabia	Visa not required	Freedom of movement; ID card valid	
Senegal	Visa on arrival	90 days	
Serbia	Visa not required	90 days	90 days visa free if holders of valid visa or residents of the Cyprus, Ireland, Schengen Area member states, United Kingdom or the United States
Seychelles	Free Visitor's Permit on arrival	3 months	
Sierra Leone	visa on arrival/eVisa		
Singapore	Visa not required	30 days	
Slovakia	Visa required		
Slovenia	Visa required		
Solomon Islands	Free Visitor’s permit on arrival		
Somalia	Electronic travel Authorisation		Available at Berbera, Borama, Burao, Erigavo and Hargeisa airports.; 30 days, available at Bosaso Airport, Galcaio Airport and Mogadishu Airport.
South Africa	visa required		Visas issued free of charge.
South Sudan	eVisa		Obtainable online; Printed visa authorization must be presented at the time of travel
Spain	Visa required		
Sri Lanka	Electronic Travel Authorisation/ Visa on arrival	30 days	Electronic Travel Authorization can also be obtained on arrival.; 30 days extendable to 6 months.; The standard visitor visa allows a stay of 60 days within any 6-month period.; Visa fees (for Standard visitor visa): SAARC - USD 35; Non SAARC - USD 75; e-Visa categories will be charged an additional USD 18.50 service fee.; If transiting from any of the Sri Lankan airports, An e-Visa is exempted (2 day transit period).
Sudan	Visa not required		
Suriname	Visa not required		
Sweden	Visa required		
Switzerland	Visa required		
Syria	Visa on arrival		According to the Law No. 2 of 2014 all visitors require visas prior to arrival. According to the IATA database, visa may be obtained on arrival and is valid for 15 days.
Tajikistan	Visa not required	30 days	At Dushanbe International Airport.
Tanzania	eVisa / Visa on arrival	90 days	
Thailand	Visa not required	60 days	
Timor-Leste	Visa on arrival	30 days	
Togo	eVisa	15 days	
Tonga	Visa required		
Trinidad and Tobago	eVisa		
Tunisia	Visa not required	3 months	
Turkey	Visa not required	90 days within last 180 days	
Turkmenistan	eVisa		Pre-arranged visa can be picked up on arrival.
Tuvalu	Visa on arrival	1 month	
Uganda	eVisa		May apply online.
Ukraine	Visa not required	90 days	
United Arab Emirates	Visa not required	Freedom of movement; ID card valid	
United Kingdom	Electronic Travel Authorisation	6 months	ETA UK will be valid for 2 years.
United States	Visa required		*May not apply for an Immigrant visa https://www.financialexpress.com/business/investing-abroad-us-border-crackdown-39-countries-face-travel-entry-ban-38-need-visa-bonds-4107113/
Uruguay	Visa required		
Uzbekistan	Visa not required	30 days	5-day visa-free transit at the international airports if holding a confirmed onward ticket for a flight to a third country.; Starting June 1, 2025. The new regulation allows nationals from Kuwait to stay in Uzbekistan for up to 30 days without a visa.
Vanuatu	Visa not required	30 days	
Vatican City	Visa required		There are no visa requirements for entry into Vatican, but it can only be accessed by passing through Italy. A multiple entry Schengen visa is required to re-enter Italy when leaving Vatican.
Venezuela	Visa not required	90 days	
Vietnam	eVisa		Visa free for 30 days when visiting Phú Quốc
Yemen	Visa on arrival	3 months	
Zambia	Visa not required		
Zimbabwe	eVisa / Visa on arrival	3 months	

== Territories and disputed areas ==
Visa requirements for Kuwaiti citizens for visits to various territories, disputed areas and restricted zones:

Visitor to	Visa requirement	Notes (excluding departure fees)
Kosovo	Visa not required	90 days
Taiwan	eVisa	30 days

== Other dependent territories ==
Territory	Conditions of access	Notes
China
Hong Kong	Visa not required	30 days
Macau	Visa not required	30 days
Denmark
Faroe Islands	Visa required	
Greenland	Visa required	
France
French Guiana	Visa required	
French Polynesia	Visa required	
(France) French West Indies	Visa required	Visa required for overseas collectivities of Saint Barthélemy and Saint Martin
Mayotte	Visa required	
New Caledonia	Visa required	
Réunion	Visa required	
Saint Pierre and Miquelon	Visa required	
Wallis and Futuna	Visa required	
Netherlands
Aruba	Visa required	Holders of a valid multi entry visa for the Schengen Territory are exempt from the visa requirements.
Caribbean Netherlands	Visa required	Includes Bonaire, Sint Eustatius and Saba.
Curaçao	Visa required	Holders of a valid multi entry visa for the Schengen Territory are exempt from the visa requirements.
Sint Maarten	Visa required	Holders of a valid multi entry visa for the Schengen Territory are exempt from the visa requirements.
New Zealand
Cook Islands	Visa not required	31 days
Niue	Visa required	
Tokelau	Visa required	
United Kingdom
Akrotiri and Dhekelia	Visa required	Stays longer than 28 days per 12-month period require a permit.
Anguilla	eVisa	Holders of a valid visa issued by the United Kingdom do not require a visa.
Bermuda	Visa not required	
British Indian Ocean Territory	Special permit required	Special permit required.
British Virgin Islands	Visa required	
Cayman Islands	Visa not required	
Falkland Islands	Visa required	
Gibraltar	Visa required	
Montserrat	eVisa	
Pitcairn Islands	Visa not required	14 days visa free and landing fee US$35 or tax of US$5 if not going ashore.
Ascension Island	eVisa	3 months within any year period
Saint Helena	eVisa	Visitor's Pass granted on arrival valid for 4/10/21/60/90 days for 12/14/16/20/25 pound sterling.
Tristan da Cunha	Permission required	Permission to land required for 15/30 pounds sterling (yacht/ship passenger) for Tristan da Cunha Island or 20 pounds sterling for Gough Island, Inaccessible Island or Nightingale Islands.
South Georgia and the South Sandwich Islands	Permit required	Pre-arrival permit from the Commissioner required (72 hours/1 month for 110/160 pounds sterling).
Turks and Caicos Islands	Visa required	Holders of a valid visa issued by Canada, United Kingdom or the USA do not required a visa for a maximum stay of 90 days.
United States
American Samoa	Visa required	
Guam	Visa required	
Northern Mariana Islands	Visa required	
Puerto Rico	Visa required	
U.S. Virgin Islands	Visa required	
Antarctica and adjacent islands
Special permits required for Bouvet Island, British Antarctic Territory, French Southern and Antarctic Lands, Argentine Antarctica, (Australia) Australian Antarctic Territory, (Antártica Chilena Province) Chilean Antarctic Territory, (Australia) Heard Island and McDonald Islands, (Norway) Peter I Island, (Norway) Queen Maud Land, (New Zealand) Ross Dependency.

Other territories

Territory	Conditions of access	Notes
Belarus; Belovezhskaya Pushcha National Park	Visa not required	3 days; must first obtain an electronic pass
China; Hainan	Visa on arrival	15 days. Available at Haikou Meilan International Airport and Sanya Phoenix International Airport. Visa not required for 15 days for traveling as part of a tourist group (5 or more people)
China; Tibet Autonomous Region	TTP required	Tibet Travel Permit required (10 US Dollars).
(Autonomous Republic of Crimea) Crimea	Visa required	Visa issued by Russia is required.
Ecuador; Galápagos	Pre-registration required	Online pre-registration is required. Transit Control Card must also be obtained at the airport prior to departure.
Eritrea outside Asmara	Travel permit required	To travel in the rest of the country, a Travel Permit for Foreigners is required (20 Eritrean nakfa).
Greece; Mount Athos	Special permit required	Special permit required (4 days: 25 euro for Orthodox visitors, 35 euro for non-Orthodox visitors, 18 euro for students). There is a visitors' quota: maximum 100 Orthodox and 10 non-Orthodox per day and women are not allowed.
India PAP/RAP	PAP/RAP required	Protected Area Permit (PAP) required for whole states of Nagaland and Sikkim and parts of states Manipur, Arunachal Pradesh, Uttaranchal, Jammu and Kashmir, Rajasthan, Himachal Pradesh. Restricted Area Permit (RAP) required for all of Andaman and Nicobar Islands and parts of Sikkim. Some of these requirements are occasionally lifted for a year.
Iran; Kish Island	Visa not required	Visitors to Kish Island do not require a visa.
Iraqi Kurdistan	Visa on arrival	Visa on arrival for 15 days is available at Erbil and Sulaymaniyah airports.
Fiji; Lau Province	Special permission required	Special permission required.
France; Clipperton Island	Special permit required	Special permit required.
Kazakhstan	Special permission required	Special permission required for the town of Baikonur and surrounding areas in Kyzylorda Oblast, and the town of Gvardeyskiy near Almaty.
North Korea outside Pyongyang	Special permit required	People are not allowed to leave the capital city, tourists can only leave the capital with a governmental tourist guide (no independent moving)
Malaysia Sabah and Sarawak	Visa not required	These states have their own immigration authorities and passport is required to travel to them, however the same visa applies.
Maldives outside Malé	Permission required	With the exception of the capital Malé, tourists are generally prohibited from visiting non-resort islands without the express permission of the Government of Maldives.
Norway; Jan Mayen	Permit required	Permit issued by the local police required for staying for less than 24 hours and permit issued by the Norwegian police for staying for more than 24 hours.
Novorossiya	Restricted area	Crossing from Ukraine requires visit purpose to be explained to Ukrainian passport control on exit and those who entered from Russia are not allowed to proceed further into Ukraine.
Russia	Special authorization required	Several closed cities and regions in Russia require special authorization.
Sudan outside Khartoum	Travel permit required	All foreigners traveling more than 25 kilometers outside of Khartoum must obtain a travel permit.
Sudan; Darfur	Travel permit required	Separate travel permit is required.
Tajikistan; Gorno-Badakhshan Autonomous Province	OIVR permit required	OIVR permit required (15+5 Tajikistani Somoni) and another special permit (free of charge) is required for Lake Sarez.
(United Nations) UN Buffer Zone in Cyprus	Access Permit required	Access Permit is required for travelling inside the zone, except Civil Use Areas.
(United Nations) Korean Demilitarized Zone	Restricted zone.	
(United Nations) UNDOF Zone and Ghajar	Restricted zone.	
United States Minor Outlying Islands	Special permits required	Special permits required for Baker Island, Howland Island, Jarvis Island, Johnston Atoll, Kingman Reef, Midway Atoll, Palmyra Atoll and Wake Island.
Venezuela; Margarita Island	Visa not required	All visitors are fingerprinted.
Vietnam; Phú Quốc	Visa not required	30 days
Yemen outside Sanaa or Aden	Special permission required	Special permission needed for travel outside Sanaa or Aden.

== Non-visa restrictions ==
=== Blank passport pages ===
Many countries require a minimum number of blank pages to be available in the passport being presented, typically one or two pages. Endorsement pages, which often appear after the visa pages, are not counted as being valid or available.

=== Vaccination ===
Cover of the new International Certificate of Vaccination issued by the Bureau of Quarantine in the Philippines since 2021

The African countries of Angola, Benin, Burkina Faso, Burundi, Cameroon, Central African Republic, Democratic Republic of the Congo, Republic of the Congo, Côte d'Ivoire, Gabon, Ghana, Guinea-Bissau, Mali, Niger, Sierra Leone and Togo, South Sudan and Uganda, along with French Guiana in South America, require all incoming passengers older than nine months to one year, to have a current International Certificate of Vaccination or Prophylaxis.

Some other countries require vaccination only if the passenger is coming from an infected area or has visited one recently or has transited for 12 hours in those countries: Algeria, Botswana, Cabo Verde, Chad, Djibouti, Egypt, Eswatini, Ethiopia, Gambia, Ghana, Guinea, Lesotho, Libya, Equatorial Guinea, Eritrea, Madagascar, Malawi, Mauritania, Mauritius, Mozambique, Namibia, Nigeria, Papua New Guinea, Seychelles, Somalia, South Africa, Sudan, Tunisia, Uganda, Tanzania, Zambia and Zimbabwe.

=== Passport validity length ===
Very few countries, such as Paraguay, just require a valid passport on arrival.

However many countries and groupings now require only an identity card – especially from their neighbours. Other countries may have special bilateral arrangements that depart from the generality of their passport validity length policies to shorten the period of passport validity required for each other's citizens or even accept passports that have already expired (but not been cancelled).

Some countries, such as Japan, Ireland and the United Kingdom, require a passport valid throughout the period of the intended stay.

In the absence of specific bilateral agreements, countries requiring passports to be valid for at least 6 more months on arrival include Afghanistan, Algeria, Anguilla, Bahrain, Bhutan, Botswana, British Virgin Islands, Brunei, Cambodia, Cameroon, Cape Verde, Cayman Islands, Central African Republic, Chad, Comoros, Costa Rica, Côte d'Ivoire, Curaçao, Ecuador, Egypt, El Salvador, Equatorial Guinea, Fiji, Gabon, Guinea Bissau, Guyana, Haiti, India, Indonesia, Iran, Iraq, Israel, Jordan, Kenya, Kiribati, Kuwait, Laos, Madagascar, Malaysia, Marshall Islands, Mongolia, Myanmar, Namibia, Nepal, Nicaragua, Nigeria, Oman, Palau, Papua New Guinea, Peru, Philippines, Qatar, Rwanda, Samoa, Saudi Arabia, Singapore, Solomon Islands, Somalia, Sri Lanka, Sudan, Suriname, Tanzania, Thailand, Timor-Leste, Tokelau, Tonga, Turkey, Tuvalu, Uganda, United Arab Emirates, Vanuatu, Venezuela, and Vietnam.

Countries requiring passports valid for at least 4 months on arrival include Micronesia and Zambia.

Countries requiring passports with a validity of at least 3 months beyond the date of intended departure include Azerbaijan, Bosnia and Herzegovina, Honduras, Montenegro, Nauru, Moldova and New Zealand. Similarly, the EEA countries of Iceland, Liechtenstein, Norway, all European Union countries (except Ireland) together with Switzerland also require 3 months validity beyond the date of the bearer's intended departure unless the bearer is an EEA or Swiss national.

Countries requiring passports valid for at least 3 months on arrival include Albania, North Macedonia, Panama, and Senegal.

Bermuda requires passports to be valid for at least 45 days upon entry.

Countries that require a passport validity of at least one month beyond the date of intended departure include Eritrea, Hong Kong, Lebanon, Macau, the Maldives and South Africa.

==== Maximum passport age ====
Countries of the Schengen area require non-EU passports to be less than 10 years old upon entry.

=== Criminal record ===
Some countries, including Australia, Canada, Fiji, New Zealand and the United States, routinely deny entry to non-citizens who have a criminal record, while others impose restrictions depending on the type of conviction and the length of the sentence.

=== Persona non grata ===
The government of a country can declare a diplomat persona non grata, banning them from entering the country or expelling them if they have already entered. In non-diplomatic use, the authorities of a country may also declare a foreigner persona non grata permanently or temporarily, usually because of unlawful activity.

=== Israeli stamps ===
Kuwait, Lebanon, Libya, and Yemen do not allow entry to people with passport stamps from Israel or whose passports have either a used or an unused Israeli visa, or where there is evidence of previous travel to Israel such as entry or exit stamps from neighbouring border posts in transit countries such as Jordan and Egypt.

To circumvent this Arab League boycott of Israel, the Israeli immigration services have now mostly ceased to stamp foreign nationals' passports on either entry to or exit from Israel (unless the entry is for some work-related purposes). Since 15 January 2013, Israel no longer stamps foreign passports at Ben Gurion Airport. Passports are still (as of 22 June 2017) stamped at Erez when passing into and out of Gaza.

Iran refuses admission to holders of passports containing an Israeli visa or stamp that is less than 12 months old.

=== Biometrics ===
Several countries mandate that all travellers, or all foreign travellers, be fingerprinted on arrival and will refuse admission to or even arrest travellers who refuse to comply. In some countries, such as the United States, this may apply even to transit passengers who merely wish to change planes rather than go landside.

Fingerprinting countries/regions include Afghanistan, Argentina, Brunei, Cambodia, China, Ethiopia, Ghana, Guinea, India, Japan, Kenya (both fingerprints and a photo are taken), Malaysia upon entry and departure, Mongolia, Saudi Arabia, the Schengen Area, Singapore, South Korea, Taiwan, Thailand, Uganda, the United Arab Emirates and the United States.

Many countries also require a photo be taken of people entering the country. The United States, which does not fully implement exit control formalities at its land frontiers (although long mandated by its own legislation), intends to implement facial recognition for passengers departing from international airports to identify people who overstay their visa.

Together with fingerprint and face recognition, iris scanning is one of three biometric identification technologies internationally standardised since 2006 by the International Civil Aviation Organization (ICAO) for use in e-passports and the United Arab Emirates conducts iris scanning on visitors who need to apply for a visa. The United States Department of Homeland Security has announced plans to greatly increase the biometric data it collects at US borders. In 2018, Singapore began trials of iris scanning at three land and maritime immigration checkpoints.

== See also ==
- Visa policy of Kuwait
- Kuwaiti passport
