= Kuwaiti passport =

Passport issued to citizens of Kuwait

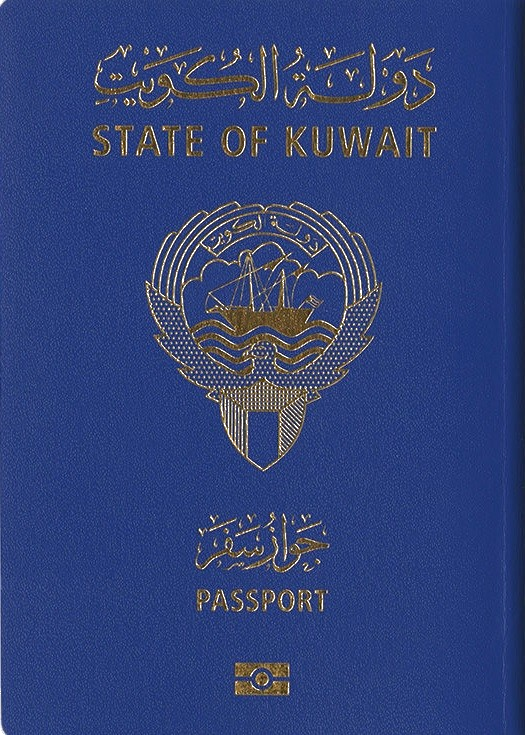
- The front cover of a Kuwaiti biometric passport
- Type: Passport
- Issued by: Kuwait
- First issued: 1920 (Sheikhdom of Kuwait); 1961 (State of Kuwait); 1998 (Machine Readable Passport); 2017 (Biometric passport)
- Purpose: Identification
- Eligibility: Kuwaiti citizenship
- Expiration: 5 years 10 years (30 years and older) 6 months (Article 14 or Stateless passport)
- Cost: 5 years Validity 3KD 10 years Validity 6KD

The Kuwaiti passport (Arabic: جواز السفر الكويتي) is a passport document issued to citizens of Kuwait for international travel.

== Types ==
There are four types of Kuwaiti passports:

1. Regular passport (blue cover): issued to citizens of Kuwait.
2. Special passport (green cover): a special passport issued to the Kuwaiti ruling family, members of parliament and high-ranking government officials.
3. Diplomatic passport (red cover): a diplomatic passport issued to diplomats serving in Kuwaiti embassies abroad and to high-ranking officials from the executive branch.
4. Article 14 passport (gray cover): a passport issued to stateless individuals in Kuwait who require to travel. These passports do not have the same visa policy as the regular passport.

== Appearance characteristics ==
The passport of a Kuwaiti citizen is distinguished by its blue colour and contains 64 pages. Each biometric passport contains an electronic chip that stores the passport holder's text and biometric personal data. The article 14 passport does not contain a biometric chip and is only valid for 6 months.

=== Identification page ===
The identity page of Kuwaiti passport includes the following data:

- Passport holder photo 4x5 cm with blue background
- Type ("P" for passport)
- Code of the country
- Serial number of the passport
- Surname and first name of the passport holder
- Citizenship
- Date of birth (DD.MM.YYYY)
- Gender (M for men or F for women)
- Place of Birth
- Date of issue (DD.MM.YYYY)
- Passport holder's signature
- Expiry date (DD.MM.YYYY)

=== Passport note ===
The following message is written on the front page of the passport in Arabic and English.

Arabic:

«باسم حضرة صاحب السمو أمير دولة الكويت أطلب من موظفي دولة الكويت وممثليها في الخارج، وأرجو من كل سلطة أخرى تعمل باسمها ومن السلطات الأجنبية المختصة أن يسمحو لحامل هذا الجواز بحرية المرور وأن يقدموا كل ما يحتاج إليه من مساعدة ورعاية.»

English:

"In The Name Of H.H The Amir of The State Of Kuwait, I request from all officials of The State Of Kuwait and its representatives abroad and all authorities acting in his name and the competent foreign authorities to allow the bearer of this passport to pass freely and to afford every assistance and protection of which the bearer may stand in need."

== Visa requirements ==
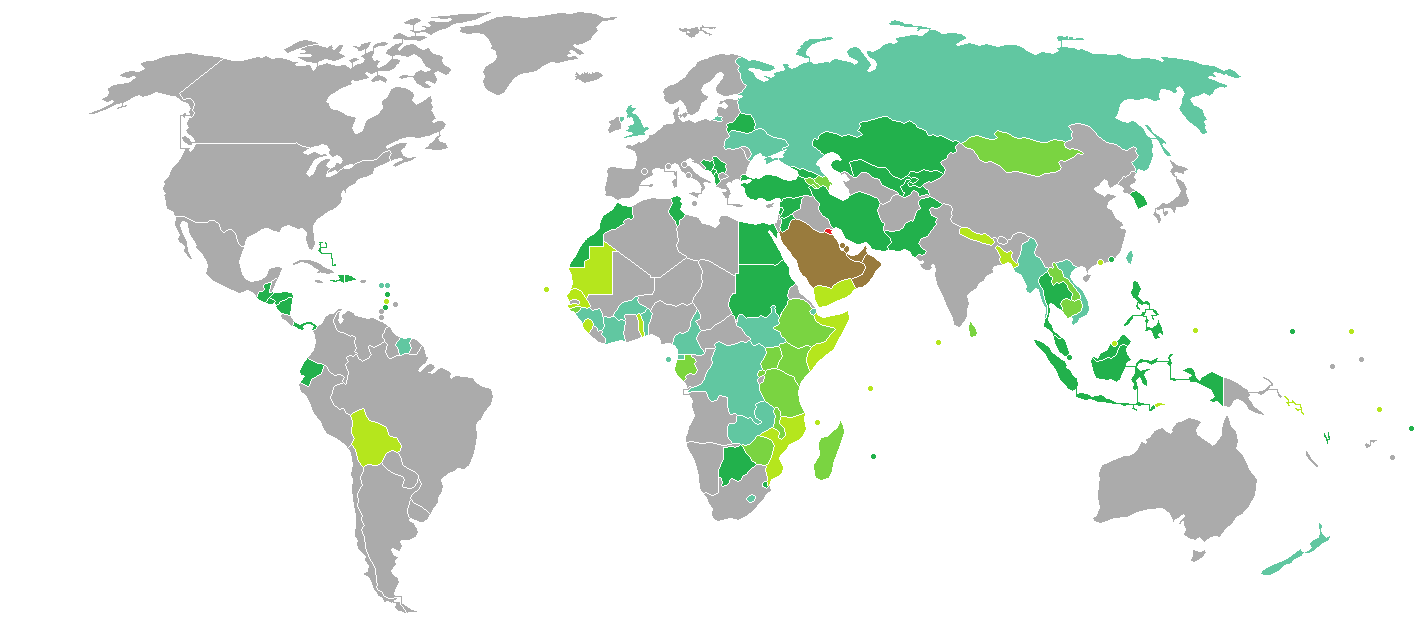
Countries and territories with visa-free or visa on arrival entry for holders of regular Kuwaiti passports Kuwait Freedom of movement Visa not required Visa on arrival eVisa Visa available both on arrival or online Visa required

As of April 2025, Kuwaiti citizens had visa-free or visa on arrival access to 98 countries and territories, ranking the Kuwaiti passport 50th in terms of travel freedom according to the Henley Passport Index.

== See also ==
- Visa policy of Kuwait
