= Embassy of Kuwait, Washington, D.C. =

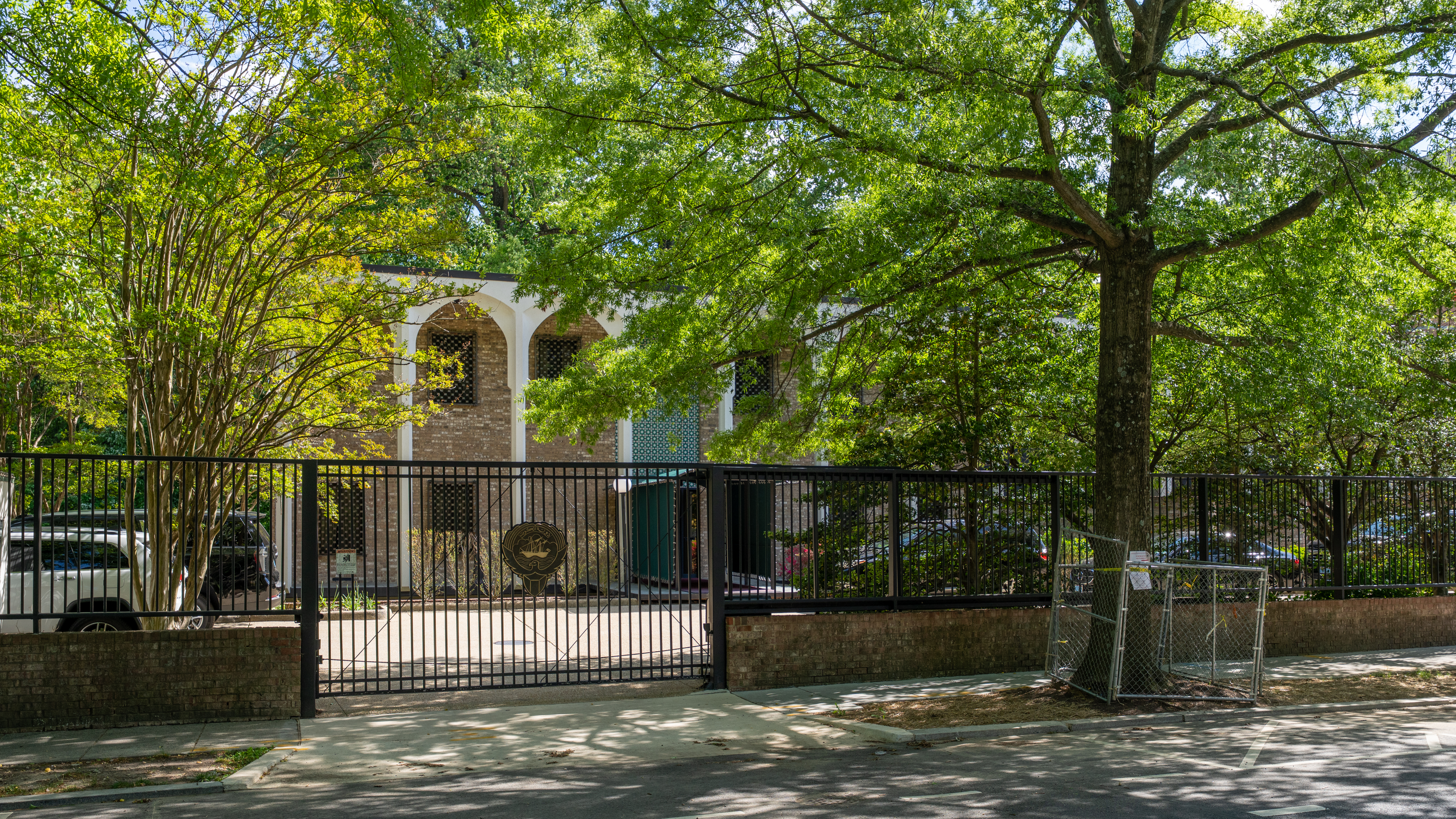
- Location: Washington, D.C.
- Address: 2940 Tilden Street, N.W.
- Coordinates: 38°56′28.5″N 77°03′55″W
- Ambassador: Sheikha Al-Zain Al-Sabah

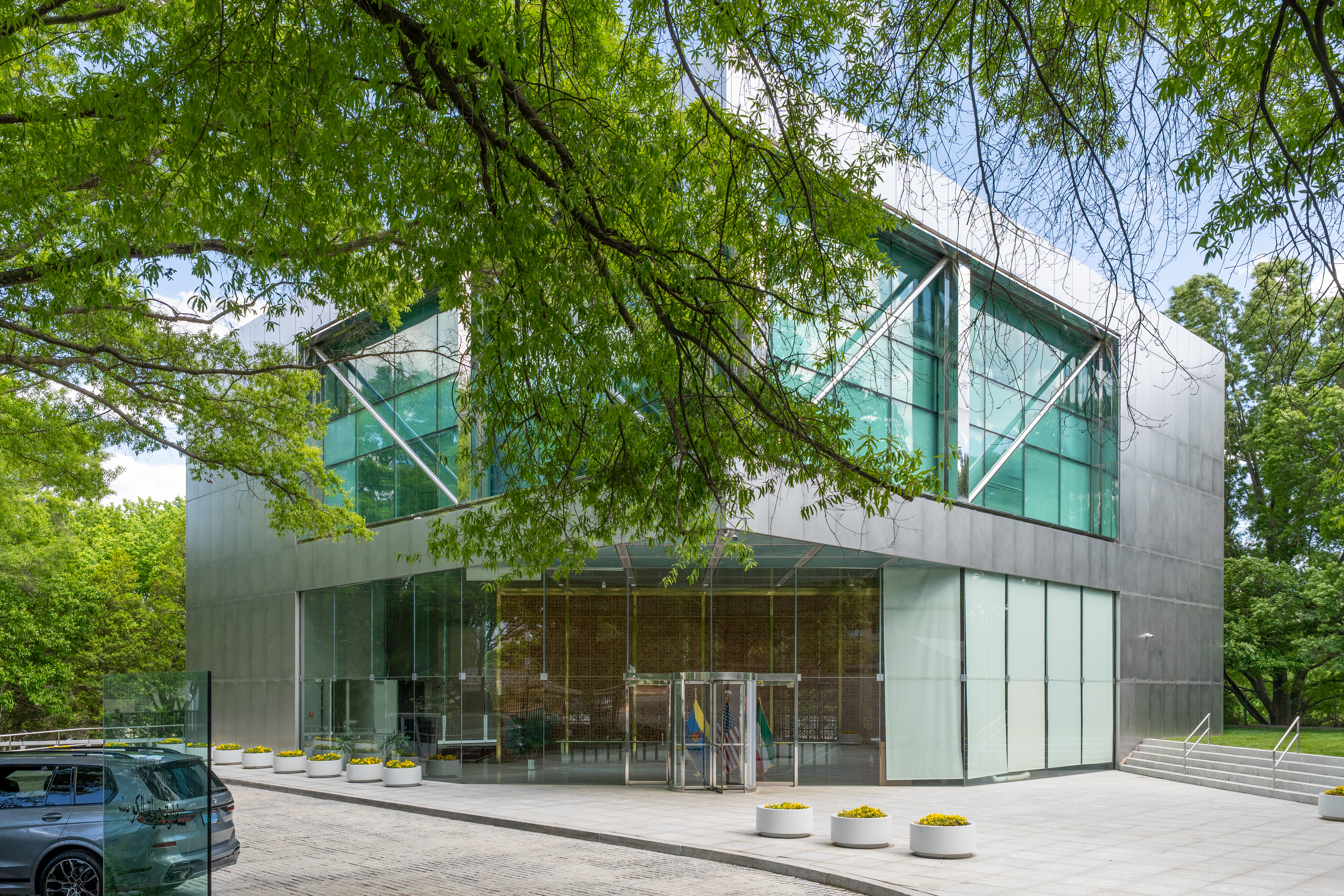
Kuwait Military Office at 3500 International Drive NW

The Embassy of Kuwait in Washington, D.C. is the diplomatic mission of the State of Kuwait to the United States. It is located in the North Cleveland Park neighborhood.

The embassy also lists a Military Office in Washington, D.C., separate from the embassy chancery on Tilden Street NW. The Military Office is listed at 3500 International Drive NW, a location within a diplomatic office area near other foreign missions.

The Ambassador is Sheikha Al-Zain Al-Sabah.

== See also ==
- List of diplomatic missions of Kuwait
- Embassy of Kuwait, London
