= Kuwaiti identity card =

National identity card of Kuwait

Kuwait Identity Card
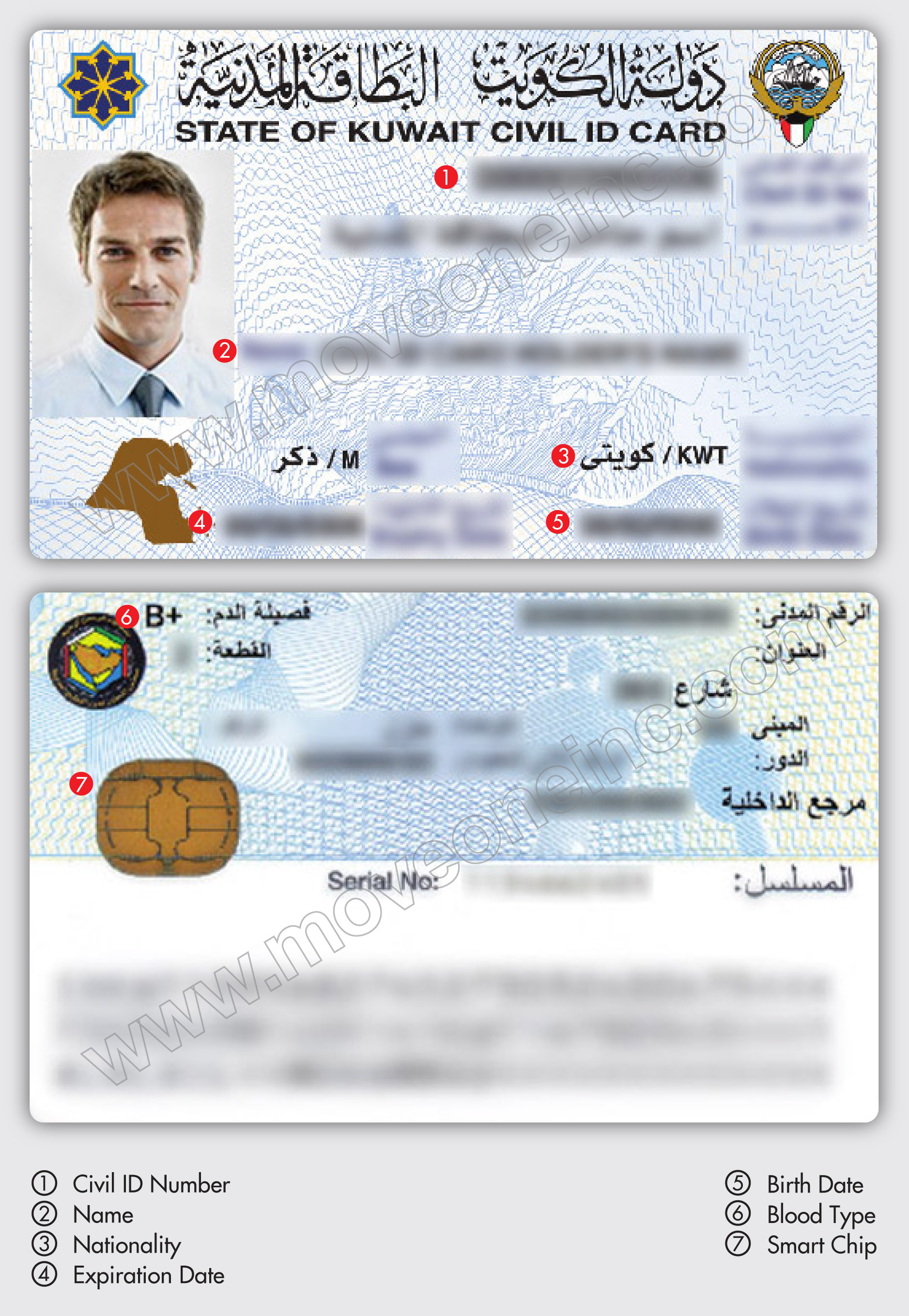
- The front and reverse of a Kuwaiti identity card
- Type: Identity card
- Issued by: The Public Authority For Civil Information
- First issued: 1962
- Purpose: Electronic identification
- Valid in: Kuwait
- Eligibility: For citizens over age 18 years and all ages of residents living in Kuwait

The Kuwaiti identity card is issued to Kuwaiti citizens and residents. It can be used as a travel document when visiting countries in the Gulf Cooperation Council.

The Kuwaiti identity card (K-1) is an identity document issued by the Government of Kuwait. It is an official identification card issued by the central authority body and contains personal information, such as name, gender, place of domicile, security issues, and other details which are related to a citizen in his/her natural life. People who are over 18 years of age are eligible to apply for their own K-1 cards.

As of 2019, expats have to use their civil ID instead of residency sticker at airports or borders.

In 2024, Kuwaiti authorities introduced a digital service through the government’s Sahel application, allowing citizens and residents to update certain Civil ID details online.
