= Al-Zain Sabah Al-Naser Al-Sabah =

Kuwait ambassador

- الشيخة الزين صباح الناصر الصباح
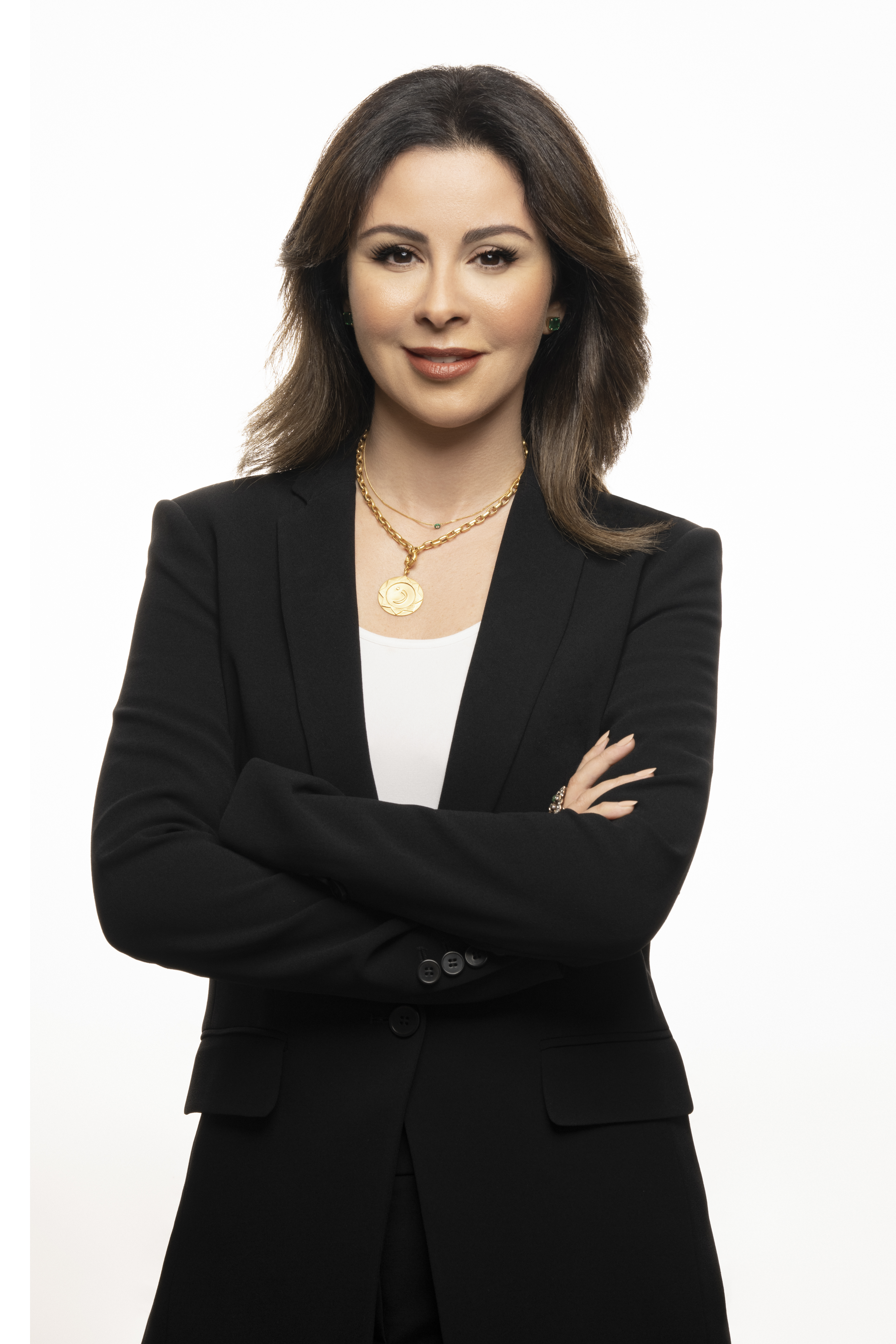

Ambassador of Kuwait to the United States
- Incumbent
- Assumed office 12 March 2023
- Preceded by: Salem Abdullah Al-Jaber Al-Sabah

Personal details
- Born: Kuwait City, Kuwait

Sheikha Al-Zain Sabah Al-Naser Al-Sabah also Al-Zain S. Al-Sabah (Arabic: الشيخة الزين الصباح ) is the Ambassador of Kuwait to the United States.

== Background and education ==
Al-Zain is the granddaughter of the late Emir of Kuwait, Sheikh Sabah Al-Salem Al-Sabah, and great-niece of the late Emir of Kuwait, Sheikh Sabah Al-Ahmad Al-Jaber Al-Sabah.

She holds a B.S. in Journalism from Boston University College of Communication as well as an M.F.A. from the University of Southern California’s School of Cinematic Arts.

== Career ==
In 2009, Al-Zain co-produced Amreeka, an official selection at the 2009 Sundance Film Festival. The film won the Fipresci Prize at the Cannes Film Festival and Best Film Award at the Cairo International Film Festival.

Al-Zain also co-produced Journey to Mecca, a film about 14th century Islamic scholar Ibn Battuta's journey from Morocco to Saudi Arabia.

She founded National Creative Industries Group (NCIG) KSCC to produce impact-driven content that bridges the dichotomy between the eastern and western markets. The company partnered with Netflix in 2021 to build and operate their first writers’ incubator/accelerator in the MENA region. Prior to NCIG, Al-Zain was Undersecretary of State for Youth Affairs in Kuwait.

Al-Zain serves on the board of several organizations including Boston University’s COM, Equality Now, the 10 Arts Foundation at the New York Film Academy, and formerly, OSN, where she served as Vice-Chair.

Prior to her ventures in the private and public sectors, Al-Zain worked in Boston and in New York, where she was on staff at ABC World News Tonight with Peter Jennings.

In 2023, she was appointed Kuwait's ambassador to the United States.

== Awards ==
- Leaders Middle East “Power Women of Arabia” Award 2015
- United Arab Media Council’s 2017 “Haithem Media Award”
- Boston University College of Communication's Distinguished Alumni Award for Service to Profession 2010
