= Visa policy of Kuwait =

Policy on permits required to enter Kuwait

Visitors to Kuwait must obtain a visa unless they are citizens from one of the visa-exempt countries or citizens who are eligible for a visa on arrival or an e-Visa.

All visitors (except Gulf Cooperation Council citizens) must hold a passport valid for at least 6 months.

== Visa policy map ==
Visa policy of Kuwait Kuwait Freedom of movement Visa on arrival / eVisa eVisa (conditional) / Visa required Admission refused

== Visa exemption ==
=== Ordinary passports ===
Citizens of the following GCC countries do not require a visa to visit Kuwait and may use national ID Cards to enter the country for an indefinite period of stay:

- Bahrain
- Oman
- Qatar
- Saudi Arabia
- United Arab Emirates

As of November 2023, use of GCC ID Cards for entry has been restored for Gulf Cooperation Council (GCC) Countries.

=== Non-ordinary passports ===
In addition to GCC Countries which are already visa-exempt, holders of diplomatic, official & service passports of Albania, Algeria, Azerbaijan, Bangladesh, Bulgaria, Cambodia, Cyprus, China, Egypt, Germany, Honduras, Hungary, India, Indonesia, Ireland, Jordan, Laos, Malaysia, Malta, Mongolia, Morocco, Pakistan, Peru, Philippines, Portugal, Romania, Russia, Serbia, Singapore, South Korea, Switzerland, Tajikistan, Turkey, Ukraine, United Kingdom and Vietnam and just diplomatic passports of Armenia, Estonia, France, Greece, Iraq, Italy, Mexico, Poland, Spain and Uzbekistan may enter Kuwait without a visa for up to 30 days.

=== Future changes ===
Kuwait has signed visa exemption agreements with the following countries, but they have not yet been ratified:

Country	Passports	Agreement signed on
El Salvador	Diplomatic, official, special	26 September 2026

== Visa on arrival / Electronic Visa (e-Visa) ==
Citizens of the following countries and territories may obtain a visa valid for 3 months on arrival to Kuwait if arriving by air or they may obtain an e-Visa before arrival:

- All European Union member states

- Andorra
- Australia
- Bhutan
- Brunei
- Cambodia
- Canada
- Georgia
- Hong Kong
- Iceland
- Japan
- Laos
- Liechtenstein
- Macao
- Malaysia
- Monaco
- New Zealand
- Norway
- San Marino
- Singapore
- South Korea
- Switzerland
- Turkey
- Ukraine
- United Kingdom
- United States
- Vatican City

A visa may also be obtained on arrival valid for 1 month for those holding a confirmation from a transporting carrier and are travelling for tourist purposes.

Passengers arriving by sea or land must obtain a visa in advance.

Residents of GCC countries belonging to designated professions may also obtain a visa online.

As of 10 August 2025, Kuwait will allow all foreign residents of GCC countries to get a tourist visa on arrival at any entry point. Residency must have at least six months of validity

== Electronic Visa (e-Visa) ==
Citizens of most countries who hold a valid Schengen, the United Kingdom or the United States tourist visa, or a residence permit issued by any GCC member state, any Schengen Area member state, the United Kingdom or the United States are eligible to apply for a simplified Kuwait e-Visa. The supporting document (visa or residence permit) must be valid for at least 6 months at the time of application.

The Kuwait e-Visa may be issued as a single or multiple-entry visa, with each stay allowed for a maximum of 30 days. The e-Visa itself can be valid for up to 1 year, depending on the applicant's eligibility and the type of visa issued.

== Israel-related restrictions ==
Nationals of Israel (including dual citizens traveling on another country's passport) are banned from entering and transiting in Kuwait. Kuwait also refuses anyone (regardless of nationality) entry and transit to any passport with evidence of travel to Israel.

== Regulations ==
In recent decades, Kuwait has enacted certain measures to regulate the issuance of new visas for foreign labor. For instance, workers from Georgia are subject to heightened security when applying for entry visas, and an outright ban was imposed on the entry of domestic workers from Guinea-Bissau and Vietnam. Workers from Bangladesh and Pakistan are also scrutinized when applying for new visas. Scrutiny also includes their medical tests from GAMCA/WAFID approved medical centers. GAMCA medical fit report declares the applicant is fit to travel. So its a must to attach that medical test report with visa application. In April 2019, Kuwait added Ethiopia, Burkina Faso, Bhutan, Guinea and Guinea-Bissau to the list of restricted countries. According to Migrant Rights, the visa restrictions are put in place mainly due to the fact that these countries lack embassies and labour corporations in Kuwait. A visa restriction on nationals of Ethiopia was lifted in 2018.

== See also ==
- Visa requirements for Kuwaiti citizens
