= Kuwait–Uzbekistan relations =

- Kuwait: Uzbekistan

Kuwait–Uzbekistan relations refer to the bilateral relations between Kuwait and Uzbekistan. Kuwait recognized the independence of Uzbekistan on December 30, 1991. Diplomatic ties were established on July 8, 1994. Kuwait has an embassy in Tashkent. Uzbekistan has an embassy in Kuwait City.

== History ==
In 2001, Kuwait opens its embassy in Tashkent, following this, Uzbekistan opens its embassy in Kuwait City in 2004.

In February 2025, President of Uzbekistan, Shavkat Mirziyoyev met with Crown Prince of Kuwait, Sheikh Sabah al-Sabah, which the two strengthened diplomatic relations. Both nations agreed upon expanding trade and financial cooperation. The two also discussed organizing regular inter-MFA consultations of the Central Asia-Gulf Cooperation Council. Both nations also signed a Cooperation Program with the Kuwait Fund for Arab Economic Development.

== High-level visits ==
High level visits from Kuwait to Uzbekistan

High level visits from Uzbekistan to Kuwait

- Shavkat Mirziyoyev (February 2025)

== See Also ==
- Foreign relations of Kuwait
- Foreign relations of Uzbekistan
