= Foreign relations of Kuwait =

Since its independence in 1961, Kuwait has maintained strong international relations with most countries, especially nations within the Arab world. Its vast oil reserves give it a prominent voice at the global economic forums and organizations like the OPEC. Kuwait is also a major ally of ASEAN, a regional ally of China, and a major non-NATO ally of the United States.

== International disputes ==
In November 1994, Iraq formally accepted the UN-demarcated border with Kuwait which had been spelled out in Security Council Resolutions 687 (1991), 773 (1992), and 883 (1993); this formally ends earlier claims to Kuwait and to Bubiyan and Warbah Island islands; ownership of Qaruh and Umm al Maradim islands are disputed by Saudi Arabia. Kuwait and Saudi Arabia continue to negatotiate a joint maritime boundary with Iran; no maritime boundary exists with Iraq in the Persian Gulf.

On March 17, Kuwait authorities arrested 16 member, 14 Kuwaiti nationals and two Lebanese nationals, who were linked to the banned terrorist organization Hezbollah. According to authorities investigation the members had firearms, ammunition, a weapon described as being used for assassinations, encrypted communication devices, drones, and maps.

== Diplomatic relations ==
List of countries which Kuwait maintains diplomatic relations with:

#	Country	Date
1	Chile	13 September 1961
2	United Kingdom	22 September 1961
3	United States	22 September 1961
4	Lebanon	27 September 1961
5	Saudi Arabia	5 October 1961
6	Egypt	2 December 1961
7	Jordan	2 December 1961
8	Japan	8 December 1961
9	Iran	17 December 1961
10	Libya	24 December 1961
11	India	26 March 1962
12	Tunisia	24 June 1962
13	Sudan	6 January 1963
14	Russia	11 March 1963
15	Serbia	7 May 1963
16	Poland	17 May 1963
17	Czech Republic	27 May 1963
18	Romania	10 June 1963
19	Thailand	14 June 1963
20	Bulgaria	15 June 1963
21	Mali	3 July 1963
22	Pakistan	21 July 1963
23	Morocco	23 October 1963
24	Syria	24 October 1963
25	Iraq	10 January 1964
26	Turkey	10 January 1964
27	Afghanistan	4 March 1964
28	Guinea	12 March 1964
29	Belgium	8 April 1964
30	Spain	17 April 1964
31	Denmark	25 April 1964
32	Hungary	7 May 1964
33	France	17 May 1964
34	Germany	20 May 1964
35	Somalia	29 July 1964
36	Netherlands	22 October 1964
37	Italy	8 November 1964
38	Algeria	23 November 1964
39	Sweden	22 December 1964
40	Colombia	26 December 1964
41	Greece	3 January 1965
42	Malaysia	28 March 1965
43	Canada	27 April 1965
44	Austria	6 June 1965
45	Norway	30 June 1965
46	Venezuela	13 September 1965
47	Switzerland	21 February 1966
48	Ethiopia	9 October 1966
49	Niger	22 November 1966
50	Brazil	20 January 1968
51	Indonesia	28 February 1968
52	Kenya	23 April 1968
53	Albania	8 August 1968
54	Argentina	13 September 1968
—	Holy See	21 October 1968
55	Finland	21 February 1969
56	Senegal	16 August 1969
57	Nigeria	31 January 1970
58	Mauritania	17 March 1970
59	Yemen	19 March 1970
60	Chad	31 March 1970
61	Sri Lanka	19 February 1971
62	China	22 March 1971
63	Bahrain	19 August 1971
64	Qatar	15 December 1971
65	Liberia	1971
66	Oman	1 January 1972
67	Nepal	25 February 1972
68	United Arab Emirates	8 March 1972
69	Uganda	28 June 1972
70	Malta	3 October 1972
71	Tanzania	19 January 1973
72	Lesotho	30 April 1973
73	Trinidad and Tobago	3 September 1973
74	Madagascar	6 December 1973
75	Bangladesh	9 March 1974
76	Cuba	29 April 1974
77	Australia	1 July 1974
78	Gambia	29 August 1974
79	Ireland	5 October 1974
80	Guinea-Bissau	6 November 1974
81	Jamaica	14 November 1974
82	Ghana	1974
83	Cameroon	22 February 1975
84	Portugal	1 April 1975
85	Mongolia	17 June 1975
86	Mexico	23 July 1975
87	Ecuador	30 July 1975
88	Burkina Faso	17 August 1975
89	Gabon	27 October 1975
90	Zambia	12 November 1975
91	Peru	1 December 1975
92	Vietnam	10 January 1976
93	Mauritius	11 January 1976
94	Panama	23 March 1976
95	Comoros	3 May 1976
96	Dominican Republic	18 October 1977
97	Maldives	1 December 1977
98	Philippines	18 January 1979
99	South Korea	11 June 1979
100	São Tomé and Príncipe	9 January 1980
101	Luxembourg	8 March 1980
102	Sierra Leone	1980
103	Uruguay	1980
104	Burundi	16 January 1981
105	Djibouti	31 October 1982
106	Bhutan	23 May 1983
107	Singapore	30 June 1985
108	New Zealand	1985
109	Bolivia	28 July 1986
110	Cape Verde	30 March 1987
111	Benin	24 December 1987
112	Seychelles	11 July 1988
113	Equatorial Guinea	1988
—	State of Palestine	3 January 1989
114	Brunei	1 May 1990
115	Namibia	27 March 1990
116	Democratic Republic of the Congo	27 November 1990
117	Zimbabwe	27 February 1991
118	Nicaragua	27 June 1991
119	Belarus	25 May 1992
120	Honduras	7 June 1992
121	Ivory Coast	23 July 1992
122	Georgia	3 September 1992
123	Slovakia	1 January 1993
124	Bosnia and Herzegovina	4 January 1993
125	Kazakhstan	11 January 1993
126	Moldova	11 January 1993
127	Paraguay	23 February 1993
128	Ukraine	18 April 1993
129	Eritrea	20 October 1993
130	Bahamas	9 March 1994
131	Lithuania	5 April 1994
132	South Africa	20 May 1994
133	Armenia	8 July 1994
134	Uzbekistan	8 July 1994
135	Latvia	15 July 1994
136	Cambodia	16 July 1994
137	Slovenia	5 October 1994
138	Croatia	8 October 1994
139	Azerbaijan	10 October 1994
140	Estonia	28 October 1994
141	Kyrgyzstan	17 December 1994
142	Turkmenistan	13 January 1995
143	Tajikistan	31 March 1995
144	Papua New Guinea	5 April 1995
145	Malawi	19 June 1995
146	Guyana	17 August 1995
147	Barbados	22 August 1995
148	Marshall Islands	27 September 1995
149	Solomon Islands	18 October 1995
150	Guatemala	12 December 1995
151	Iceland	26 April 1996
152	Mozambique	20 May 1996
153	Eswatini	22 May 1996
154	Botswana	10 June 1996
155	North Macedonia	16 June 1997
156	Angola	20 November 1997
157	Antigua and Barbuda	9 July 1998
158	Myanmar	16 December 1998
159	El Salvador	9 December 1999
160	Republic of the Congo	31 October 2000
161	North Korea	4 April 2001
162	Timor-Leste	16 December 2003
163	Cyprus	3 May 2005
164	Fiji	28 September 2005
165	Belize	8 May 2006
166	Costa Rica	22 September 2006
167	Central African Republic	9 April 2007
168	Andorra	17 March 2008
169	Liechtenstein	16 June 2008
170	Laos	14 July 2008
171	Montenegro	27 July 2010
172	Togo	6 October 2010
173	Saint Lucia	31 January 2011
174	Haiti	5 September 2012
175	Vanuatu	9 November 2012
176	Saint Kitts and Nevis	16 November 2012
177	Tuvalu	29 November 2012
178	Saint Vincent and the Grenadines	8 January 2013
—	Kosovo	16 January 2013
179	South Sudan	12 February 2013
180	Nauru	9 April 2013
181	Grenada	17 May 2013
182	Rwanda	19 September 2013
183	Kiribati	4 March 2014
184	San Marino	17 December 2014
185	Palau	26 May 2015
186	Federated States of Micronesia	1 September 2016
187	Monaco	19 July 2018
188	Tonga	2 September 2021
189	Dominica	10 September 2021
—	Cook Islands	8 December 2021
190	Suriname	31 January 2024

== Bilateral relations ==
=== Africa ===
Country	Formal Relations Began	Notes
Kenya	23 April 1968	See Kenya–Kuwait relations Both countries established diplomatic relations on 23 April 1968 when has been accredited first Ambassador of Kuwait to Kenya with residence in Nairobi Mr. Mohammad A. Al-Mishari.: Kenya has an embassy in Kuwait City.; Kuwait has an embassy in Nairobi.

=== Americas ===
Country	Formal Relations started	Notes
Chile	13 September 1961	Both countries established relations on 13 September 1961: In February 2011, Kuwait opened a resident embassy in Santiago; Chile maintains a non-resident embassy for Kuwait, accredited from its embassy in Abu Dhabi, United Arab Emirates.
Canada	27 April 1965	Both countries established diplomatic relations on 27 April 1965. In 1965, official relations between Kuwait and Canada were launched when the US ambassador to Kuwait began to act as a non-resident ambassador to Canada. In 1978, Canada opened its embassy in Kuwait City. Kuwait opened its embassy in Ottawa in 1993.
Colombia	26 December 1964	Both countries established diplomatic relations on 26 December 1964: Kuwait is accredited to Colombia from Washington D.C, United States; Colombia is accredited to Kuwait from Abu Dhabi, United Arab Emirates; In 2024, bilateral trade between Colombia and Kuwait totaled $11.93 million, resulting in a trade surplus of $7.49 million for Colombia. During this period, Colombia exported $9.71 million in goods to Kuwait and imported $2.22 million.
Mexico	23 July 1975	See Kuwait–Mexico relations Both countries established diplomatic relations on 23 July 1975: Kuwait has an embassy in Mexico City.; Mexico has an embassy in Kuwait City.
Peru	1 December 1975	Main article: Kuwait–Peru relations Both countries established diplomatic relations on 1 December 1975: Peru has an embassy in Kuwait City.; Kuwait is accredited to Peru from Santiago, Chile.; In 2024, bilateral trade between Kuwait and Peru resulted in a $4.43 million trade deficit for Kuwait, with $278,000 in exports to Peru and $4.71 million in imports.
United States	22 September 1961	Both countries established diplomatic relations on 22 September 1961 See Kuwait–United States relations United States Chairman of the Joint Chiefs of Staff, Martin Dempsey, with Kuwaiti Prime Minister Sheikh Jaber Mubarak Al-Sabah in 2011. The United States opened a consulate in Kuwait in October 1951, which was elevated to embassy status at the time of Kuwait's independence 10 years later.: Kuwait has an embassy in Washington, D.C. and an consulates-general in Los Angeles and New York City.; the United States has an embassy in Kuwait City.
Uruguay	1980	Uruguay is accredited to Kuwait from its embassy in Riyadh, Saudi Arabia.; Kuwait is accredited to Uruguay from its embassy in Buenos Aires, Argentina.; In November 2011, the Mayor of Kuwait City Zeid Aiesh Al Azimi was on an official state visit to Montevideo on which he discussed investment opportunities in Uruguay's agricultural and dairy sectors.; In January 2026, Uruguay and Kuwait held their first round of political consultations to strengthen bilateral cooperation and trade tie.

=== Asia ===
Kuwait, is a member of the Cooperation Council for the Arab States of the Gulf (GCC), which includes, Saudi Arabia, Bahrain, Qatar, the United Arab Emirates, and Oman. These countries, have solid, and unbreakable bilateral relations. Citizens of these countries, may enter other GCC, country with their national ID. GCC citizens are allowed to reside at any other GCC, nation an unlimited period of time. They also follow the same economic plan, and give each other military, and Intelligence support. They also have similar, educational, social, plans. The GCC countries, discuss their foreign policies, as they try to maintain similar foreign policies. These six monarchies are also known as the oil-rich countries of the Middle East.

Kuwait failed to ratify the 2012 GCC Internal Security Pact, which sough to coordinate domestic repression of the political opposition across GCC members.

Country	Formal Relations Began	Notes
Armenia	8 July 1994	Armenia has an embassy in Kuwait City.; Kuwait has an embassy in Yerevan.
Azerbaijan	10 October 1994	Azerbaijan has an embassy in Kuwait City.; Kuwait has an embassy in Baku.
Bahrain	2 September 1971	See Bahrain–Kuwait relations Both countries established diplomatic relations on 2 September 1971 In 2024, bilateral trade between Kuwait and Bahrain totaled $421 million, resulting in a $109 million trade deficit for Kuwait as exports reached $156 million against $265 million in imports from Bahrain. Kuwait's main exports to Bahrain were led by petroleum coke ($81.7 million), while Bahrain's primary exports to Kuwait included cheese ($32.3 million) and raw aluminum ($23.6 million).: Bahrain has an embassy in Kuwait City.; Kuwait has an embassy in Manama.
China	22 March 1971	See China–Kuwait relations China and Kuwait established diplomatic relations on 22 March 1971. In 2007, Kuwait exported $2.3 billion worth of goods to China ($2.1 billion of which was oil) and Kuwait imported $1.3 billion of goods from China. In 2007, Kuwait supplied China with 95,000 barrels (15,100 m^{3}) of oil per day, accounting for 2.6% of China's total crude oil imports. Saudi Arabia was China's top supplier with its shipments jumping 69.8 percent to 3.84 million tons (939,000 bbl/d), followed by Angola with 2.06 million tons (503,000 bbl/d), down 27.1 percent. Iran became third, with imports from the country shrinking 35.3 percent to 1.18 million tons (289,000 bbl/d). China is the world's second-biggest oil consumer after the US. Abdullatif Al-Houti, managing director of International Marketing at state-run Kuwait Petroleum Corporation (KPC), told KUNA in October that Kuwait is on course for its China-bound crude oil export target of 500,000 bbl/d (79,000 m^{3}/d) by 2015, but success will heavily depend on the Sino-Kuwaiti refinery project. The two countries have been in talks for the planned 300,000 bbl/d (48,000 m^{3}/d) refinery in China's southern Guangdong Province. The complex is expected to be on-stream by 2020. In July 2018, the State Administration for Science, Technology and Industry for National Defence signed an agreement with the Government of Kuwait to increase cooperation in the defense industry. China also agreed to increase investment in the Kuwaiti energy sector. In July 2019, UN ambassadors of 37 countries, including Kuwait, have signed a joint letter to the UNHRC defending China's treatment of Uyghurs in the Xinjiang region. In June 2020, Kuwait was one of 53 countries backed the Hong Kong national security law at the United Nations.
Georgia	3 September 1992	Both countries established diplomatic relations on 3 September 1992.: Georgia has an embassy in Kuwait City.; Kuwait is accredited to Georgia from its embassy in Yerevan, Armenia.
India	26 March 1962	See India–Kuwait relations Both countries established diplomatic relations on 26 March 1962 when India and Kuwait have decided to raise their diplomatic missions to Embassy level. India and Kuwait enjoy mutual relationship due to the strategic position of both nations in the important lane of trade and development of Asia. India and Kuwait enjoy traditionally friendly relations. These are based in history and have stood the test of time. Geographic proximity, historical trade links, cultural affinities and presence of a large number of Indian expatriates continue to sustain and nurture this long standing relationship. India has been a natural trading partner and a destination for higher learning. Until 1961, the Indian Rupee was the legal tender in Kuwait. High level visits from India to Kuwait have included those by Vice President of India Dr. Zakir Husain in 1965, by Prime Minister Indira Gandhi in 1981 and by Vice President of India Shri M Hamid Ansari in 2009. High level visits from Kuwait to India have included those by the Crown Prince and Prime Minister Sheikh Sabah Al-Salem Al-Sabah in November 1964, the Amir Sheikh Jaber Al-Ahmed Al-Jaber Al-Sabah in 1980 and again in 1983 (for the NAM Summit), and the Amir Sheikh Sabah Al-Ahmed Al-Jaber Al-Sabah in 2006. According to the Kuwaiti Ministry of Interior, there are approximately 600,000 Indians, who constitute the largest expatriate community in Kuwait. The Indian community is regarded as the community of first preference among the expatriates in Kuwait. Kuwait views India as a fast-growing economy and a source of highly qualified professional and technical personnel. A large proportion of the Indian expatriates are unskilled and semi-skilled workers. Professionals like engineers, doctors, chartered accountants, scientists, software experts, management consultants, architects; skilled workers like technicians and nurses; semi-skilled workers; retail traders and businessmen are also present in the Indian community. Of late, there has been an increase in the number of highly qualified Indian experts in hi-tech areas, especially in the software and financial sector in Kuwait. In the field of health, India not only supplies top specialists but also para-medical staff who enjoy high reputation. The total remittance from Kuwait to India is estimated to be upwards of US$3 billion annually. Approximately 300 associations exist within the Indian community in Kuwait, representing a variety of regional, professional and cultural interests. Of these, 128 Associations are presently registered with the embassy. Cultural events are organised regularly by these associations through the year, to which leading Indian artistes are often invited. There are 18 Indian Schools in Kuwait affiliated to the Central Board of Secondary Education, New Delhi.
Iran	17 December 1961	See Iran–Kuwait relations Both countries established diplomatic relations on 17 December 1961. Iran and Kuwait signed a demarcation agreement in 1965. On 13 July 2008, Kuwait's Speaker of the Parliament Jassem Al-Kharafi publicly accused the West of provoking Iran on the nuclear issue. In his interview with state-owned Kuwait TV, Al-Kharafi said, "What is happening is that there are provocative Western statements, and Iran responds in the same way... I believe that a matter this sensitive needs dialogue not escalation, and it shouldn't be dealt with as if Iran were one of America's states." In 2026, following the start of Operation Epic Fury, Iran attacked Arab States including Kuwait, Kuwait repeatedly condemned the attacks on its territory, on May 1, Kuwaiti Forces exchanged fire with Iranian Forces in Bubiyan Island.: Iran has an embassy in Kuwait City.; Kuwait has an embassy in Tehran.
Iraq	10 January 1964	See Iraq–Kuwait relations, Kurdistan Region–Kuwait relations Both countries established diplomatic relations on 10 January 1964. Diplomatic relations severed on 2 August 1990 when then Iraqi president Saddam Hussein sent his forces to occupy the small Gulf emirate and restore diplomatic relations on 2 August 2004. On March 2, 2021, Iraqi official said that Iraq has so far paid $49.5 billion in war reparations to Kuwait. Mazhar Salih, an adviser to the Prime Minister, told Al-Sabaah newspaper that Iraq's dues now amount to only $2.5 billion.
Israel		See Israel–Kuwait relations Kuwait has no diplomatic ties with Israel, and boycotts Israeli products. In January 2014, Kuwait boycotted a renewable energy conference attended by Israel in Abu Dhabi, because Kuwait opposes normalization of ties with Israel. In December 2008, Kuwaiti lawmakers protested in front of the Kuwait National Assembly Building against Israel during the Gaza War. The Kuwaiti lawmakers burned Israeli flags, waved banners reading, "No to hunger, no to submission" and chanted "Allahu Akbar". Israel launched air strikes against Hamas in the Gaza Strip on December 26 after Hamas launched rockets into the Israeli town of Sderot following the expiration of a six-month ceasefire on December 18. On January 3, 2009, MPs protested in front of the National Assembly again. After Friday prayers on January 8, 2009, Jamaan Al-Harbash and several other MPs urged Arab leaders to take a stronger stand against the Israeli attacks and open Rafah Crossing to end an embargo imposed by Israel on the residents of Gaza. In November 2012, Kuwait and the World Bank concluded an agreement according to which Kuwait contributed a US$50 million grant to the World Bank's Palestinian Reform and Development Program (PRDP).
Japan	8 December 1961	Both countries established diplomatic relations on 8 December 1961. The two nations have agreed to work together on the security of the oil trade route that connects them.: Japan has an embassy in Kuwait City.; Kuwait has an embassy in Tokyo.
Lebanon	27 September 1961	Both countries established diplomatic relations on 27 September 1961: Kuwait has an embassy in Beirut.; Lebanon has an embassy in Kuwait City.
Malaysia	28 March 1965	See Kuwait–Malaysia relations Both countries established diplomatic relations on 28 March 1965: Kuwait has an embassy in Kuala Lumpur.; Malaysia has an embassy in Kuwait City. Relations are mainly in economic cooperation.
Northern Cyprus		Northern Cyprus has a Representative Office in Kuwait City.
Pakistan	21 July 1963	See Kuwait–Pakistan relations Both countries established diplomatic relations on 21 July 1963 when Kuwait opens embassy in Islamabad. The relationship between Kuwait and Pakistan are exemplary, brotherly, historical and deep based on shared history, traditions and common culture. Kuwait and Pakistan have always enjoyed deep economic and cultural ties. After the end of the first Gulf War in 1991 Pakistani army engineers were involved in a programme of mine clearance in the country. Kuwait was also the first country to send aid to isolated mountain villages in Kashmir after the quake of 2005, also offering the largest amount of aid in the aftermath of the quake ($100m).
Qatar	15 December 1971	See Kuwait–Qatar relations Both countries established diplomatic relations on 15 December 1971.: Kuwait has an embassy in Doha.; Qatar has an embassy in Kuwait City.
Saudi Arabia	5 October 1961	See Kuwait–Saudi Arabia relations Both countries established diplomatic relations on 5 October 1961. Although Kuwait and Saudi Arabia have good relations and cooperate within OPEC and the GCC, Riyadh disputes Kuwait's ownership of the Qaruh and Umm al Maradim islands.: Kuwait has an embassy in Riyadh and a consulate-general in Jeddah.; Saudi Arabia has an embassy in Kuwait City.
South Korea	11 June 1979	The Republic of Korea and Kuwait have had diplomatic relations since 11 June 1979. On 2 March 2015, foreign minister Yun Byung-se and his Kuwaiti counterpart Sheikh Sabah Al-Khalid Al-Hamad Al-Sabah signed a bilateral Agreement on the mutual waiver of visa requirements for holders of diplomatic, official, and special passports in the presence of the heads of state of the Republic of Korea and Kuwait. South Korea and Kuwait maintain economic cooperation across several sectors. South Korea imports approximately 100 million barrels of crude oil from Kuwait annually, and total bilateral trade between the two nations reaches $10 billion.: Kuwait has an embassy in Seoul.; South Korea has an embassy in Kuwait City
Syria	24 October 1963	See Kuwait–Syria relations Both countries established diplomatic relations on 24 October 1963 Kuwait–Syria relations became somewhat strained due to the Syrian Civil War after Kuwait closed its embassies along with the rest of the Arab States of the Persian Gulf. Bilaterial relations have since come to focus on humanitarian efforts for Syria instead. For example, Kuwait has hosted three international pledging conferences in 2013, 2014 and 2015, raising 1.5bn, 2.4bn and 3.8bn respectively. Relations between the two countries have since normalized. In 2016, Kuwait co-hosted the Supporting Syria and the Region Conference in London along with the United Kingdom, Kuwait, Germany and Norway. The conference resulted in a record $10 billion pledge.
Turkey	10 January 1964	Both countries established diplomatic relations on 10 January 1964 See Kuwait–Turkey relations The Ministry of Foreign Affairs in Turkey describes the current relations at "outstanding levels". Bilateral trade between the two countries is worth around $275 million. The two countries have recently signed fifteen agreements for cooperation in tourism, health, environment, economy, commercial exchange and oil.: Kuwait has an embassy in Ankara and a consulate-general in Istanbul.; Turkey has an embassy in Kuwait City.
United Arab Emirates	8 March 1972	See Kuwait–United Arab Emirates relations Both countries established diplomatic relations on 8 March 1972 Bilateral trade between Kuwait and the United Arab Emirates reached AED 55.5 billion (15.1 billions USD) in 2025, representing an 11.3% increase compared to 2024. Growth was primarily driven by Emirati investment and private-sector collaboration in sectors such as logistics, energy, tourism, and artificial intelligence.: Kuwait has an embassy in Abu Dhabi and a consulate-general in Dubai.; United Arab Emirates has an embassy in Kuwait City.
Vietnam	10 January 1976	Both countries established diplomatic relations on 10 January 1976 Kuwait was the first country in the GCC that Vietnam chose to establish its trade representative office in 1993, and embassy in 2003. The former Prime Minister of Kuwait Sheikh Nasser Al-Mohammed Al-Ahmad Al-Sabah and Prime Minister Nguyen Tan Dung in 2009 visited each other's countries.
Yemen		As a member of the UN Security Council in 1990 and 1991, Yemen abstained on a number of resolutions concerning the Iraqi invasion of Kuwait and voted against the "use of force resolution." Kuwait responded by cancelling aid programs, cutting diplomatic contact, and expelling thousands of Yemeni workers.

=== Europe ===
Country	Formal Relations Began	Notes
Albania	8 August 1968	Both countries established diplomatic relations on 8 August 1968 Kuwait – Albania friendship monument Albania and Kuwait are members of the Organisation of Islamic Cooperation. The restoration of Skanderbeg Square in Albanian capital Tirana is funded by a grant from the State of Kuwait.: Albania has an embassy in Kuwait City.; Kuwait has an embassy in Tirana.
Austria		Austria has an embassy in Kuwait City.; Kuwait has an embassy in Vienna.
Belgium		Belgium has an embassy in Kuwait City.; Kuwait has an embassy in Brussels.
Cyprus	3 May 2005	Both countries established diplomatic relations on 3 May 2005 See Cyprus-Kuwait relations Cyprus and Kuwait can be described as excellent with various exchange visits between the two countries.: Cyprus has an embassy in Kuwait City.; Kuwait has an embassy in Nicosia.
Czech Republic		the Czech Republic has an embassy in Kuwait City.; Kuwait has an embassy in Prague.
Denmark	25 April 1964	Both countries established diplomatic relations on 25 April 1964. On 6 November 2006, the Kuwaiti parliament voted 22–15 to approve severing diplomatic ties with Denmark over the Jyllands-Posten Muhammad cartoons controversy and spending about US$50 (€39.20) million to defend Muhammad's image in the West. Both votes were nonbinding, meaning the Cabinet does not have to abide by them. Kuwaiti lawmaker Abdulsamad voted in favor of cutting diplomatic ties, saying, "We have to cut diplomatic and commercial ties with Denmark...We don't have to eat Danish cheese." Al-Rashid voted against cutting diplomatic ties, arguing that Muslims have to be positive and remember that it were some individuals, not governments, who insulted Muhammad. Al-Rashid was quoted as saying, "We here in Kuwait curse Christians in many of our mosques, should those (Christian) countries boycott Kuwait?"
France		See France–Kuwait relations: France has an embassy in Kuwait City.; Kuwait has an embassy in Paris.
Germany	20 May 1964	See Germany–Kuwait relations: Kuwait has an embassy in Berlin.; Germany has an embassy in Kuwait City.
Greece	3 January 1965	Both countries established diplomatic relations on 3 January 1965 Greece was one of the 34 member countries in the coalition which assisted in the liberation of Kuwait from Iraq in 1991 during the Gulf War. Greece also participated in the UNICOM mission to patrol the demilitarized zone along the Kuwait-Iraq border.: Greece has an embassy in Kuwait City.; Kuwait has an embassy in Athens.
Holy See	21 October 1968	Both countries established diplomatic relations on 21 October 1968: Holy See has an apostolic nunciature in Kuwait City.
Hungary		Hungary has an embassy in Kuwait City.; Kuwait has an embassy in Budapest.
Italy		Italy has an embassy in Kuwait City.; Kuwait has an embassy in Rome.
Kosovo	16 January 2013	Kuwait recognised the Republic of Kosovo on 11 October 2011.; Kosovo and Kuwait established diplomatic relations on 16 January 2013.
Netherlands		Kuwait has an embassy in The Hague.; the Netherlands has an embassy in Kuwait City.
Poland	13 May 1963	Both countries established diplomatic relations on 13 May 1963: Kuwait has an embassy in Warsaw.; Poland has an embassy in Kuwait City.
Romania		Kuwait has an embassy in Bucharest.; Romania has an embassy in Kuwait City.
Spain	17 April 1964	See Kuwait–Spain relations Both countries established diplomatic relations on 17 April 1964: Kuwait has an embassy in Madrid.; Spain has an embassy in Kuwait City.
Sweden	22 December 1964	Both countries established diplomatic relations on 22 December 1964 when Sweden opens its embassy in Kuwait.
United Kingdom		See Kuwait–United Kingdom relations Kuwait established diplomatic relations with the United Kingdom on 8 November 1961.: Kuwait maintains an embassy in London.; The United Kingdom is accredited to Kuwait through its embassy in Kuwait City.; The UK governed Kuwait from 1899 to 1961, when it achieved full independence. Both countries share common membership of the World Trade Organization. Bilaterally the two countries have signed an Investment Agreement. The UK and the Gulf Cooperation Council, of which Kuwait is a member, are negotiating a Free Trade Agreement.

=== Oceania ===
Country	Formal Relations Began	Notes
Australia		Australia has an embassy in Kuwait City.; Kuwait has an embassy in Canberra.
New Zealand		Kuwait has an embassy in Wellington.; New Zealand is accredited to Kuwait from its embassy in Riyadh, Saudi Arabia.

== See also ==
- List of diplomatic missions in Kuwait
- List of diplomatic missions of Kuwait
- Iran-Arab Relations (Kuwait)
- Visa requirements for Kuwaiti citizens
