= Kuwait–Mongolia relations =

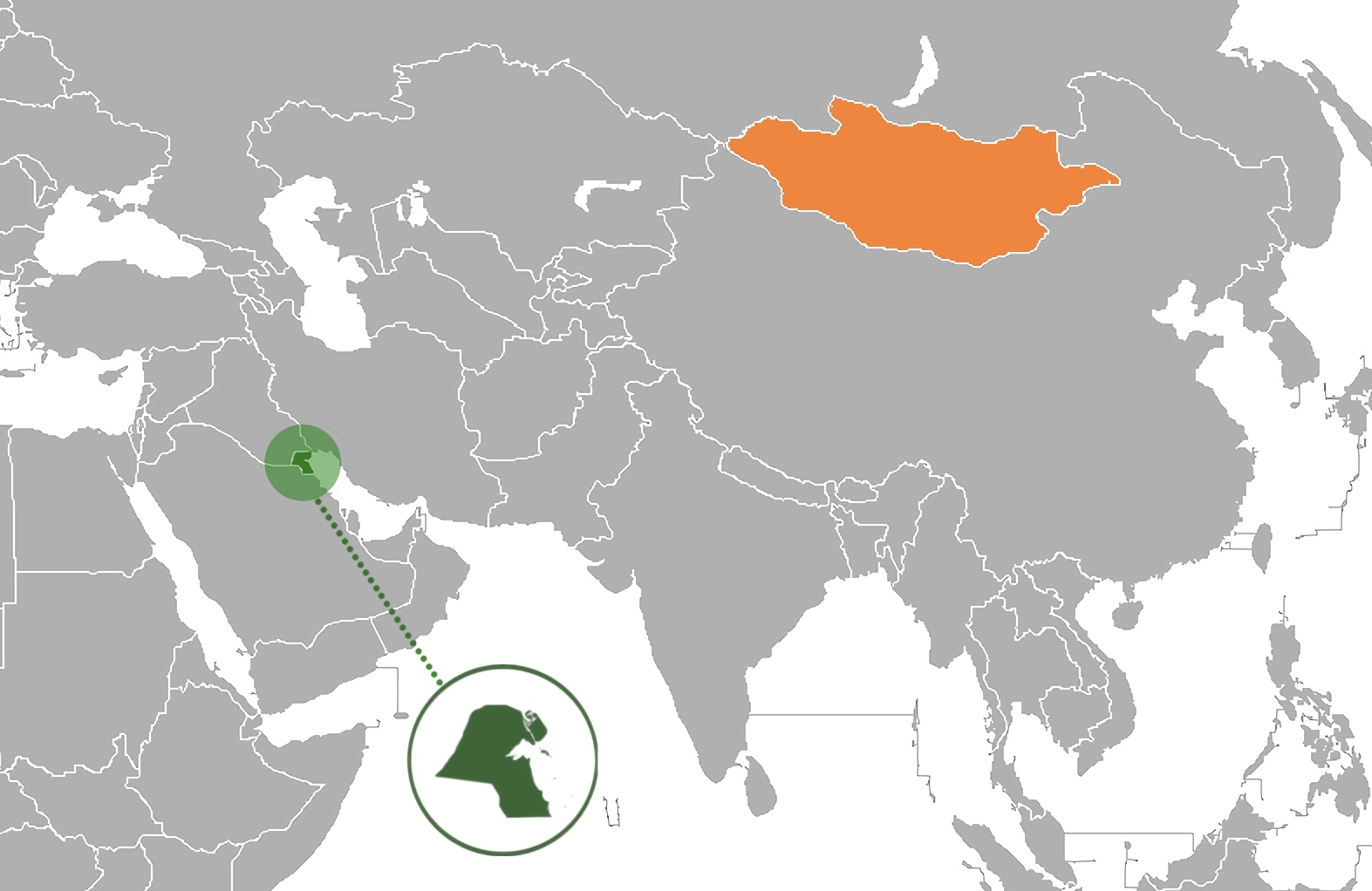

- Kuwait: Mongolia

Diplomatic mission
- Embassy of Kuwait, Ulaanbaatar: Embassy of Mongolia, Kuwait City

Envoy
- Sergelen Purev: Mutlaq Al-Thuwaimer

The Kuwait–Mongolia relations are the bilateral foreign relations between the State of Kuwait and Mongolia.

== History ==
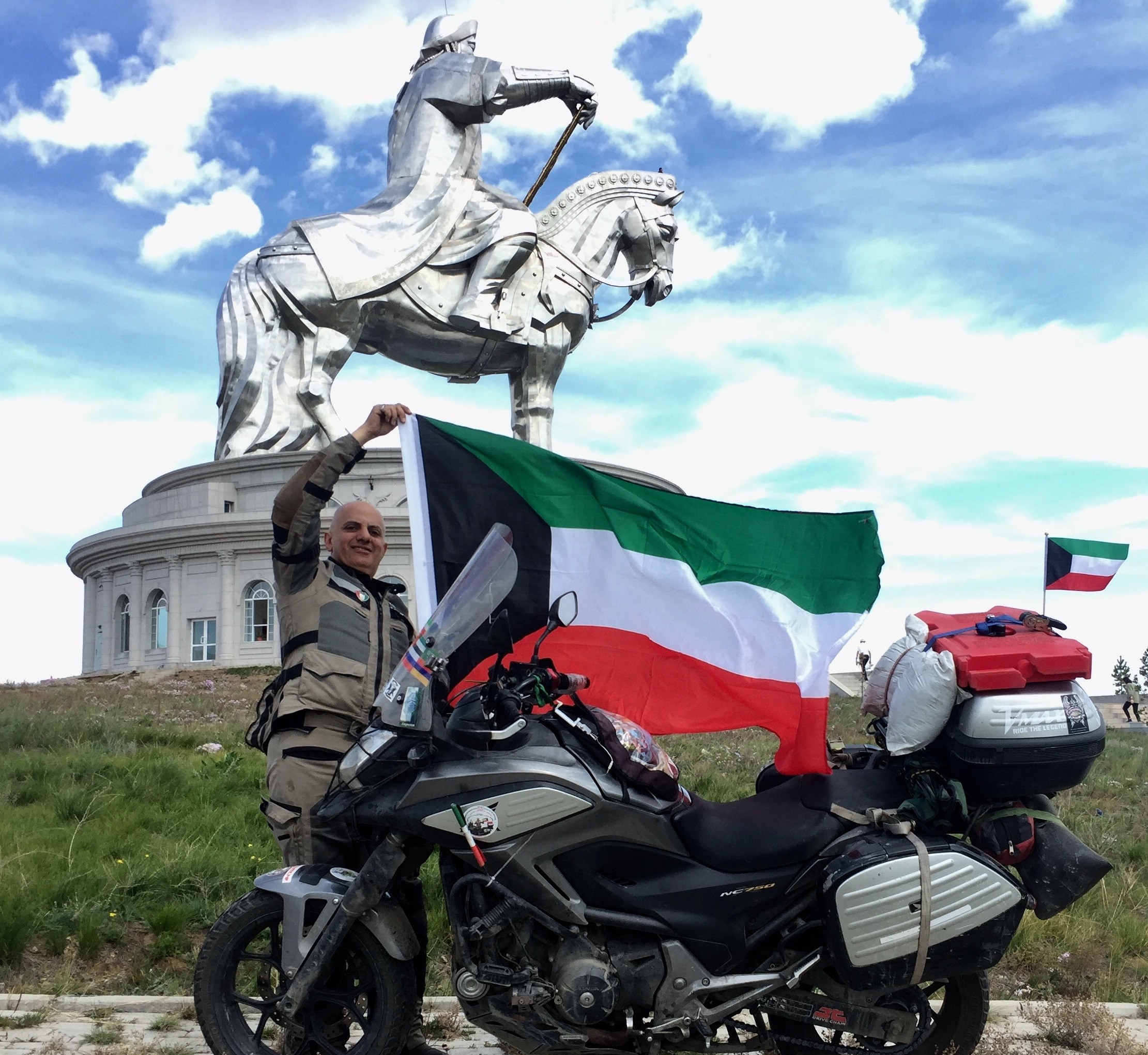
A motorbike rider holding the flag of Kuwait in front of the Genghis Khan Monument, Mongolia

Formal diplomatic relations between Mongolia and Kuwait were established in 1975. Kuwait was the first country of the Gulf Cooperation Council (GCC) to establish diplomatic ties with Mongolia. During the Iraqi invasion of Kuwait in 1990, Mongolia was among the early nations to publicly oppose the occupation and express solidarity with Kuwait. This stance contributed to a sense of mutual trust that would later support closer bilateral engagement.

Since the 1990s, the Kuwait Fund for Arab Economic Development (KFAED) has played a significant role in financing various projects in Mongolia. As of 2018, the institution had made four loans worth around KD 23.97 million ($80 million) in various sectors, apart from technical assistance in the form of grants valued at KD 433,569 for feasibility studies.

Due to the abundance of mineral resources in Mongolia such as gold, copper, coal, silver, and uranium, some investors and international press have dubbed the country the "Kuwait of Central Asia." (Note: While both nations rely heavily on natural resources, Kuwait’s economy is centred on oil and gas, while Mongolia’s resources are mainly minerals and coal.) The term gained currency in the early 2010s during a surge of foreign investment in Mongolian mining, though the country's economic development has since taken a different path from that of Kuwait.

In December 2011, Mongolian President Tsakhia Elbegdorj visited Kuwait and met with Emir Sheikh Sabah Al-Ahmad Al-Jaber Al-Sabah to discuss expanding bilateral relations. During the visit, Mongolian officials engaged with the Kuwait Investment Authority, which expressed interest in exploring investment opportunities in Mongolia's infrastructure, agriculture, and mining sectors. According to a 2015 magazine report, about 20 Mongols live in Kuwait.

In July 2018, KFAED and the government of Mongolia reached an agreement on the balance of a US$3.5 million grant for building the Undurkhaan Airport in Khentii Province, Mongolia. The agreement was signed by Mongolian Ambassador Zorigt Chintushig and KFAED Deputy Director-General Ghanim Suleiman Al-Ghenaiman. The project aimed to enhance the airport's air transport infrastructure and was scheduled to be completed by mid-2021.

In October 2024, Mongolia began exporting meat products to Kuwait, marking a new phase in trade relations. The year 2025 marked the 50th anniversary of bilateral ties between the two countries. On January 19, 2025, the two countries signed an Agreement on Air Relations in Kuwait City, creating a legal framework to permit direct flights between them for the first time. The agreement was signed by Mongolia's State Secretary of the Ministry of Road and Transport, Batbold Sandagdorj, and Kuwait's President of the Directorate General of Civil Aviation, Sheikh Humoud Mubarak Al-Jaber Al-Sabah.

In November 2025, Mongolia's ambassador to Kuwait, Sergelen Purev, held talks with Kuwait University officials at the Sabah Al-Salem University City campus. The discussions covered potential student exchanges and research partnerships between universities in both countries. The meeting also served as preparation for a planned state visit to Kuwait by Mongolian President Khurelsukh Ukhna. The ambassador noted that Mongolian graduates of Arabic language programs act as informal envoys, strengthening ties between the two nations.

On December 7, 2025, the Mongolian Embassy in Kuwait City hosted a reception celebrating both the fiftieth anniversary of diplomatic ties and Mongolia's Proclamation Day. The event featured traditional music and dance performed by the Grand Theatre for National Arts of Mongolia, a vocal performance by opera singer Ayana, and a fashion showcase by designer B. Maralmaa of Precious Fashion House of Mongolia. A full concert was scheduled for the following day at the American University of Kuwait.

== See also ==
- Foreign relations of Kuwait
- Foreign relations of Mongolia
