= Kuwait–Spain relations =

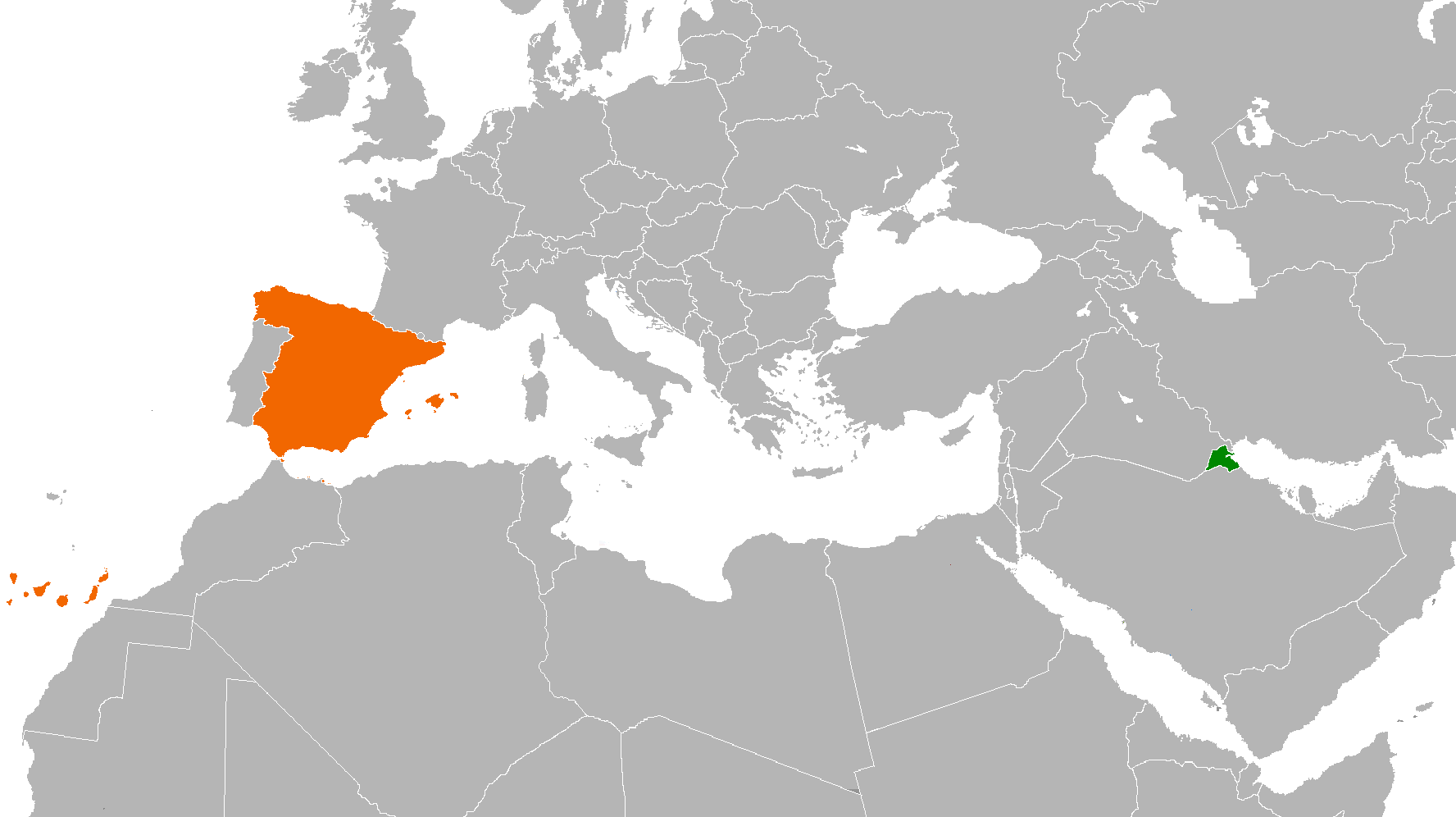

- Kuwait: Spain

Kuwait–Spain relations are the diplomatic relations between Kuwait and Spain. Kuwait has an embassy in Madrid and Spain has one in Kuwait City.

== Diplomatic relations ==
Spain and Kuwait established diplomatic relations shortly after the independence of Kuwait in 1961 and, by Decree 3500/1964, of October 29, the Spanish Embassy in Kuwait was created. Spain was one of 35 countries that participated in the international coalition that, under the mandate of the United Nations, contributed to the liberation of Kuwait in February 1991 after the Iraqi invasion of Kuwait in August 1990.

By Royal Decree 977/2011, of July 8, the Aggregation of Economy and Commerce of the Embassy of Spain in Kuwait was created. Bilateral relations are excellent and are based on a firm friendship between the two Royal Houses.

== Economic relations ==
Economic and commercial relations between Spain and Kuwait have traditionally been very discreet, but since 2010 they are growing at a good pace. In July 2011, the Economic and Commercial Office of the Spanish Embassy in Kuwait was officially created to strengthen the Spanish commercial presence in the country, coinciding with a significant improvement in export figures and the signing of contracts by several Spanish companies .

In 2014, bilateral trade reached a record high, with Spanish exports to Kuwait of more than 380 million euros per year (diversified by sectors, with a great weight of textile fashion, ceramic products and mechanical appliances), and imports of 111 million (oil and byproducts).

Spain has thus become the 22nd emirate provider. In recent times, several Spanish companies have signed contracts in Kuwait, especially construction and engineering companies such as OHL (Jamal Abdul Nasser Road) INECO (Kuwait Airport Expansion Project Management) as well as INDRA (Air Traffic Control and Communications System of Kuwait Airport) and HERA (Decontamination of oil spills). In 2015, the contracts of the Elecnor and TSK companies were signed with the Kuwait Institute for Scientific Research for the construction and implementation of a strategic renewable energy pilot project in Al Shagaya, as well as two important contracts in the petrochemical sector of which Tecnicas Reunidas is a beneficiary (Al Zur Refinery and 5th Gas Train of the port of Ahmadi).

In 2024, bilateral economic relations between Spain and Kuwait accounted for $678 million in trade, resulting in a trade surplus of $91.3 million for Spain. Spanish exports to Kuwait totaled $385 million, led by gas turbines ($52.5 million), packaged medicaments ($36.1 million), and unglazed ceramics ($13.2 million). Conversely, Kuwait exported $293 million to Spain, heavily dominated by refined petroleum ($275 million) alongside ethylene polymers ($11.1 million) and coal tar oil ($1.65 million).

== Resident diplomatic missions ==
- Kuwait has an embassy in Madrid.
- Spain has an embassy in Kuwait City.

== See also ==
- Foreign relations of Kuwait
- Foreign relations of Spain
- List of ambassadors of Spain to Kuwait
