= List of ambassadors of Spain to Kuwait =

Ambassador of Spain to Kuwait
- Coat of arms of Spain
- Incumbent; Manuel Hernández Gamallo since 19 June 2024
- Ministry of Foreign Affairs; Secretariat of State for Foreign Affairs
- Style: The Most Excellent
- Residence: Kuwait City
- Nominator: The Foreign Minister
- Appointer: The Monarch
- Term length: At the government's pleasure
- Inaugural holder: Manuel Valdés Larrañaga
- Formation: 1964
- Website: Mission of Spain to Kuwait

The ambassador of Spain to Kuwait is the official representative of the Kingdom of Spain to the State of Kuwait. It is also accredited to the Kingdom of Bahrain.

Bilateral contacts between Kuwait and Spain started in late 1961 and, in 1964, diplomatic relations were formally established with the appointment of ambassadors. In this case, in October that year Spain opened a non-resident embassy in Kuwait City and entrusted it to the ambassador in Beirut, Lebanon.

After the independence of several Middle East countries, Spain established diplomatic relations with them, granting in 1972 the resident status to the Embassy to Kuwait and dually accredited to Bahrain, Oman, Qatar and the United Arab Emirates. Except Bahrain, the rest of the aforementioned countries were divided in the mid-1970s between the newly created resident embassies to Saudi Arabia and the United Arab Emirates.

== Jurisdiction ==
- Kuwait: The Spanish Embassy in Kuwait City provides diplomatic and consular services to the whole country.
- Bahrain: Both countries established diplomatic relations after Bahrain's independence, in 1972. For consular affairs, Spain has an honorary consulate in Manama.

== List of ambassadors ==
Ambassador		Term	Nominated by	Appointed by	Accredited to
1	Manuel Valdés Larrañaga (Note: Resident in Beirut, Lebanon, and also accredited to Cyprus.); Marquess consort of Avella	10 November 1964 – 28 April 1970 (5 years, 159 days)	Fernando María Castiella	Francisco Franco	Abdullah Al-Salim Al-Sabah
2	José Luís Flórez-Estrada y Ayala (Note: Resident in Beirut, Lebanon.)	22 August 1970 – 27 May 1972 (1 year, 279 days)	Gregorio López-Bravo	Francisco Franco	Sabah Al-Salim Al-Sabah
3	Ramón Armengod López (Note: Accredited to Bahrain, Oman, Qatar, and the United Arab Emirates.)	27 May 1972 – 23 June 1976 (4 years, 27 days)	Gregorio López-Bravo	Francisco Franco	Sabah Al-Salim Al-Sabah
4	Andrés Drake Alvear (Note: Accredited to Bahrain, Qatar and the United Arab Emirates.)	23 June 1976 – 16 April 1977 (297 days)	The Count of Motrico	Juan Carlos I	Sabah Al-Salim Al-Sabah
5	Fernando Schwartz (Note: Accredited to Bahrain.)	16 April 1977 – 29 July 1981 (4 years, 104 days)	The Marquess of Oreja	Juan Carlos I	Sabah Al-Salim Al-Sabah
6	Emilio Barcia García-Villamil	29 July 1981 – 16 September 1987 (6 years, 49 days)	José Pedro Pérez-Llorca	Juan Carlos I	Jaber Al-Ahmad Al-Sabah
7	Juan José Arbolí Desvalls	18 January 1988 – 2 August 1991 (3 years, 196 days)	Francisco Fernández Ordóñez	Juan Carlos I	Jaber Al-Ahmad Al-Sabah
8	César Alba	2 August 1991 – 2 September 1996 (5 years, 31 days)	Francisco Fernández Ordóñez	Juan Carlos I	Jaber Al-Ahmad Al-Sabah
9	José Luis Roselló Serra	13 September 1996 – 11 November 2000 (4 years, 70 days)	Abel Matutes	Juan Carlos I	Jaber Al-Ahmad Al-Sabah
10	Álvaro Alabart Fernández-Cavada	11 November 2000 – 28 August 2004 (3 years, 291 days)	Josep Piqué	Juan Carlos I	Jaber Al-Ahmad Al-Sabah
11	Jesús Carlos Riosalido Gambotti	28 August 2004 – 11 September 2007 (3 years, 14 days)	Miguel Ángel Moratinos	Juan Carlos I	Jaber Al-Ahmad Al-Sabah
12	Manuel Gómez de Valenzuela	22 September 2007 – 5 February 2011 (3 years, 136 days)	Miguel Ángel Moratinos	Juan Carlos I	Sabah Al-Ahmad Al-Jaber Al-Sabah
13	Ángel Losada Fernández	5 February 2011 – 7 June 2014 (3 years, 122 days)	Trinidad Jiménez	Juan Carlos I	Sabah Al-Ahmad Al-Jaber Al-Sabah
14	Carlos Sáenz de Tejada Gorman	7 June 2014 – 14 July 2018 (4 years, 37 days)	José Manuel García-Margallo	Juan Carlos I	Sabah Al-Ahmad Al-Jaber Al-Sabah
15	Álvaro Rodríguez Álvarez	14 July 2018 – 24 June 2020 (1 year, 345 days)	Josep Borrell	Felipe VI	Sabah Al-Ahmad Al-Jaber Al-Sabah
16	Miguel José Moro Aguilar	24 June 2020 – 19 June 2024 (3 years, 361 days)	Arancha González Laya	Felipe VI	Sabah Al-Ahmad Al-Jaber Al-Sabah
17	Manuel Hernández Gamallo	19 June 2024 – present (2 years, 70 days)	José Manuel Albares	Felipe VI	Mishal Al-Ahmad Al-Jaber Al-Sabah

== See also ==
- Kuwait–Spain relations
