= Kuwait–United Arab Emirates relations =

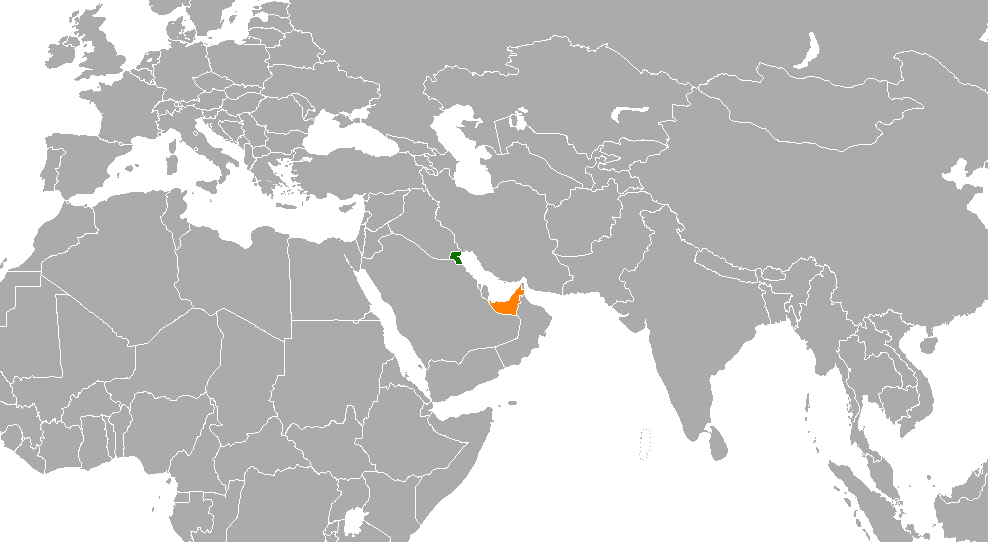

- Kuwait: United Arab Emirates

The United Arab Emirates has an embassy in Kuwait City, and Kuwait maintains an embassy in Abu Dhabi and a consulate-general in Dubai. Both countries are part of the Gulf Cooperation Council, Arab world, and Middle East region and share close cultural ties.

== Diplomatic relations ==
=== Gulf War ===
Following the invasion of Kuwait, the United Arab Emirates condemned the Iraqi aggression, supported Kuwaiti independence and rapidly opened all of its airports for coalition use. Additionally, ports and shipyard facilities in the UAE were made available for the deployment of coalition forces. The UAE Armed Forces participated in the coalition with an army battalion along with a squadron of Dassault Mirage 5 and Mirage 2000. Six Emirati troops were killed in action.

== Resident diplomatic missions ==
- Kuwait has an embassy in Abu Dhabi and a consulate-general in Dubai.
- the United Arab Emirates has an embassy in Kuwait City.

== See also ==
- Foreign relations of Kuwait
- Foreign relations of the United Arab Emirates
