= Fernando Schwartz =

Spanish writer (born 1937)

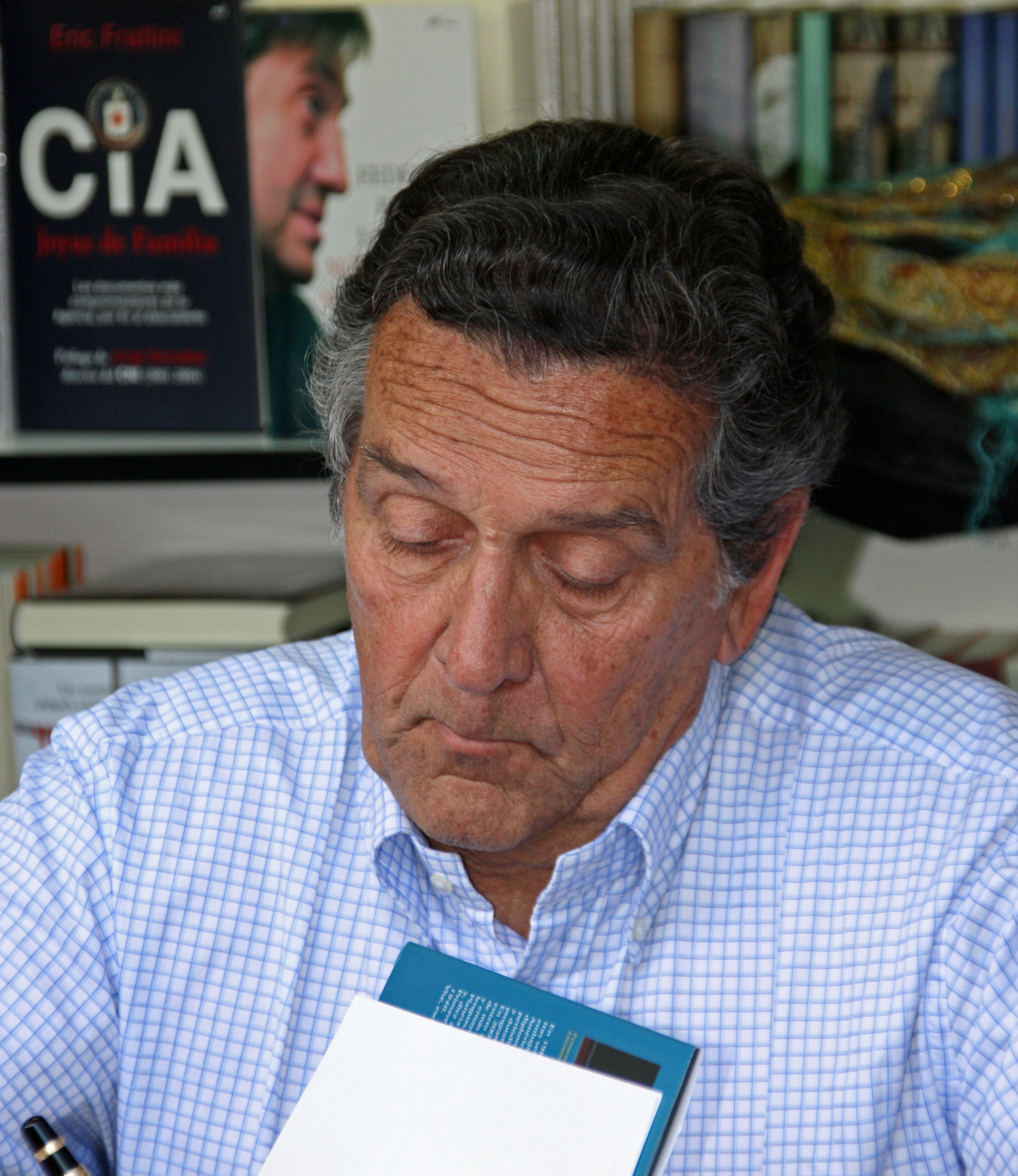
Schwartz in 2008

Fernando Schwartz (born 1937) is a Spanish writer and former diplomat.

== Life ==
Schwartz was born in 1937 in Geneva. As the son of diplomats and a diplomat for 25 years he has lived in several countries. He was ambassador of Spain to Kuwait and Bahrein and to the Netherlands and spokesman of foreign policy until 1988.

He worked later for PRISA group as councillor, spokesman and communication in chief of El País newspaper. He has been professor of Opinion in UAM journalism department and conductor of TV program Lo más Plus in Canal Plus. He lives currently between Madrid and Mallorca with his family.

== Partial bibliography ==
- El cuenco de laca, 2008
- Vichy 1940, 2006
- Cambio dos de veinticinco por una de cincuenta, 2002
- Educación y descanso. Las anécdotas de la diplomacia, 2000
- El engaño de Beth Loring, 2000
- El desencuentro, 1996
- La venganza, 1988
- La conspiración del Golfo, 1982
- La internacionalización de la guerra civil española, 1971

== Prizes ==
- Premio Primavera de Novela. 2006
- Premio Planeta 1996
- Finalista a Premio Planeta 1982
