= Indians in Kuwait =

People of Indian birth or origin who reside in Kuwait

Total population
- 1,000,726 (2023)

Regions with significant populations
- Kuwait City • Al Jahra • Farwaniya • Jleeb Al-Shuyoukh • Salmiya

Languages
- Malayalam • Kannada • Telugu • Hindi • Tamil • Tulu • Urdu • Rajasthani • Konkani • Gujarati • Languages of India

Religion
- Hinduism • Christianity • Islam • Sikhism • Religions of India

Related ethnic groups
- Indian diaspora

The community of Indians in Kuwait includes Indian expatriates in Kuwait, as well as Kuwaiti citizens of Indian origin or descent. According to the Indian ministry of external affairs, there are around 1,000,726 Indians as of 2023. The majority of these originate from the south Indian states of Kerala, Karnataka, Andhra Pradesh, Telangana, Tamil Nadu, with the former constituting for 66% of the population of Indian nationals.

== Overview ==
Kuwaitis view India as a fast-growing economy and a source of highly qualified professional and technical personnel.

Professionals like Engineers, doctors, Lawyers, Chartered accountants, Scientists, software experts, management professionals and consultants, Architects, retail traders and businessmen mainly constitute the Indian community. Of late, there has been an increase in the number of highly qualified Indian experts in hi-tech areas, especially in the software and financial sector in Kuwait. In the field of health, India not only supplies top specialists but also para-medical staff who enjoy a high reputation. Inward remittances from Kuwait to India are substantial.

There are 18 Indian schools in Kuwait affiliated to the Central Board of Secondary Education (CBSE). There were 164 Indian community Associations earlier registered with the Indian Embassy of Kuwait. Following introduction of a re-registration requirement, 106 of these Indian community Associations have once again registered with the Embassy and the number of registered Associations is growing at a steady pace.

== Religion ==
Indian are the most numerous expat group in Kuwait. consisting of a number of Muslims, Christians, Hindus, Sikhs and Buddhists. Members of religious groups not mentioned in the Quran, such as Hindus, Sikhs and Buddhists, are not allowed to build official places of worship. However, these groups have religious freedom and can freely engage in religious activities, including public marriage and other celebrations.

== Education ==
Indian schools in Kuwait include:

- Bharatiya Vidya Bhavans – Indian Educational School, Smart Indian School
- Indian Public School
- Salmiya Indian Model School Kuwait
- Jabriya Indian School
- Indian Central School (Kuwait)
- Indian Community School Kuwait
- India International School (Kuwait)
- Carmel School (Kuwait)
- Indian English Academy School
- Fahaheel Al Watanieh Indian Private School
- United Indian School
- Learners Own Academy
- Integrated Indian School
- Indian Central School
- Gulf Indian School

== See also ==
- India–Kuwait relations
- 1990 airlift of Indians from Kuwait
- Indian diaspora
- Expatriates in Kuwait
