= Kuwait–Malaysia relations =

- Kuwait: Malaysia

Kuwait–Malaysia relations refers to bilateral foreign relations between Kuwait and Malaysia. Kuwait has an embassy in Kuala Lumpur, and Malaysia has an embassy in Kuwait City. Relations between the two countries are mainly in economic co-operation.

== Economic relations ==
Malaysia is one of the major trade partners for Kuwait; bilateral trade had jumped from U$79.3 in 1996 to U$507 million in 2006. Kuwait Finance House, which is considered the largest Islamic bank on the Persian Gulf, started operating in Malaysia in 2008. Several agreements such as avoidance of tax were signed, and both countries are currently looking any possibilities to work together on other areas such education, tourism and the halal industry. In 2013, Kuwait and Malaysia agreed to boost bilateral co-operation in education.

== Resident diplomatic missions ==
- Kuwait has an embassy in Kuala Lumpur.
- Malaysia has an embassy in Kuwait City.

== See also ==
- Foreign relations of Kuwait
- Foreign relations of Malaysia
