= Cyprus–Kuwait relations =

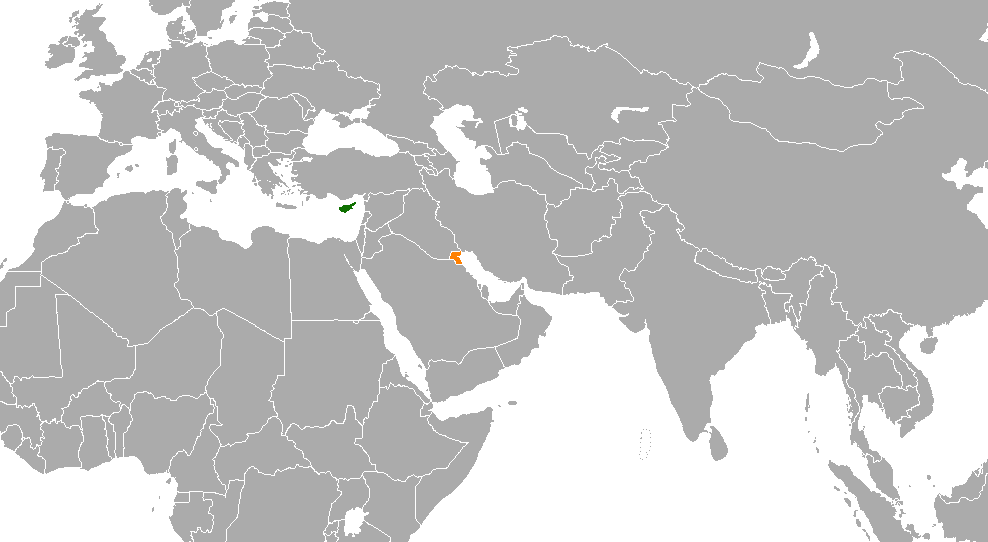

- Cyprus: Kuwait

Cyprus was among the first countries to recognize the independence of Kuwait in 1961 and there have been expatriates of both sides, living and working in both countries. However, diplomatic relations were only established on 3 May 2005. Cyprus has an embassy in the Kuwait city, and Kuwait has an embassy in Nicosia.

== Cooperation ==
On 26 September 2025, Cypriot President Nikos Christodoulides emphasized the significance of Cyprus-Kuwait relations during a meeting with Kuwaiti Crown Prince Sheikh Sabah Al-Khalid Al-Sabah in New York. He discussed enhancing bilateral ties in investment, tourism, and education, and acknowledged Kuwait's role in regional security as President of the Gulf Cooperation Council. Christodoulides also mentioned Cyprus' EU Council Presidency in January 2026 and affirmed commitment to strengthening relations with the Gulf and the broader Middle East and North Africa, alongside support for EU-Kuwait and EU-GCC cooperation. The Crown Prince expressed gratitude for Cyprus' humanitarian efforts, particularly in facilitating foreign evacuations.

On 29 June 2026, Kuwait's Ambassador to Cyprus, Abdullah Al-Turki, met with Cypriot Foreign Minister Constantinos Kombos to discuss enhancing bilateral relations and cooperation. The Kuwaiti Embassy highlighted Al-Turki's transmission of greetings from Foreign Minister Sheikh Jarrah Jaber Al-Ahmad Al-Sabah, wishing for Cyprus' continued progress. Al-Turki praised Cyprus' role during its EU presidency in fostering cooperation with the Gulf Cooperation Council and commended its supportive stance on Gulf security. Both officials emphasized the need for ongoing coordination on mutual concerns and shared views on various regional and international issues, aiming to strengthen collaboration moving forward.

== Opening of the Kuwait embassy in Cyprus ==
With the opening of the Kuwait embassy in Nicosia, President Demetris Christofias assured the ambassador of Kuwait in 2011 that relations between the two countries will be further enhanced and that Cyprus had never forgotten the contribution Kuwait made in the stability of the Cypriot economy during times of crisis in its history.

== See also ==
- Foreign relations of Cyprus
- Foreign relations of Kuwait
