= Kuwait–Mexico relations =

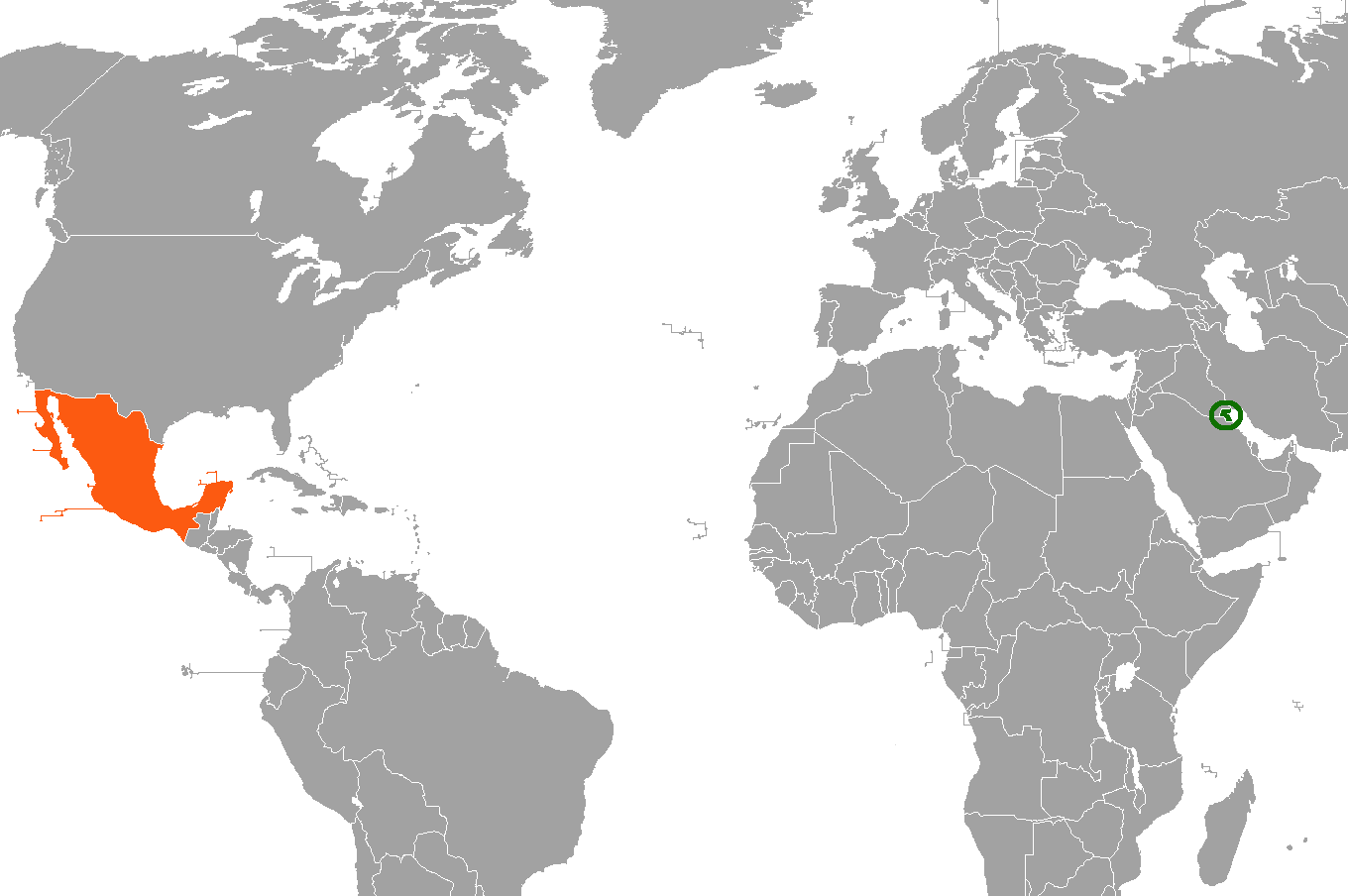

- Kuwait: Mexico

The nations of Kuwait and Mexico established diplomatic relations in 1975. Both nations are members of the United Nations.

== History ==
Both nations established diplomatic relations on 23 July 1975. On 28 July 1975, Mexican President Luis Echeverría paid a four-day official visit to Kuwait. During his visit, President Echeverría met with Emir Sabah Al-Salim Al-Sabah and together they visited a petrochemical plant and a desalinization water plant. The two leaders also discussed the events taking place in the Middle East at the time.

During the Gulf War, Mexico placed its own sanctions on Iraq after it invaded Kuwait. In 2010, Kuwait opened an embassy in Mexico City. In July 2010, Kuwaiti Prime Minister Nasser Al-Sabah paid an official visit to Mexico and met with President Felipe Calderón. During the visit, both leaders agreed on a memorandum to establish a consulting mechanism on mutual interests to increase political dialogue and cooperation in all fields.

In September 2010, Prime Minister Al-Sabah returned to Mexico to join the country's bicentennial celebration. In February 2011, Mexican Foreign Secretary Patricia Espinosa paid a visit to Kuwait to attend the celebrations of its 50th year of Independence, 20th year of freedom since the Iraqi invasion and 5th year of the ascension to the throne by Emir Sabah Al-Ahmad Al-Jaber Al-Sabah. Mexico opened its embassy in the Kuwaiti capital in 2011.

In March 2014, Mexican Foreign Secretary José Antonio Meade paid a visit to Kuwait. During the visit, both nations agreed to eliminate visa requirements for diplomatic passport holders. In December 2014, Mexico awarded the Order of the Aztec Eagle to Kuwaiti Emir Sabah Al-Ahmad Al-Jaber Al-Sabah. In January 2016, Mexican President Enrique Peña Nieto paid an official visit to Kuwait. During his visit, both nations signed eleven agreements and memorandums in energy and health cooperation.

In 2023, both nations celebrated 48 years of diplomatic relations.

== High-level visits ==
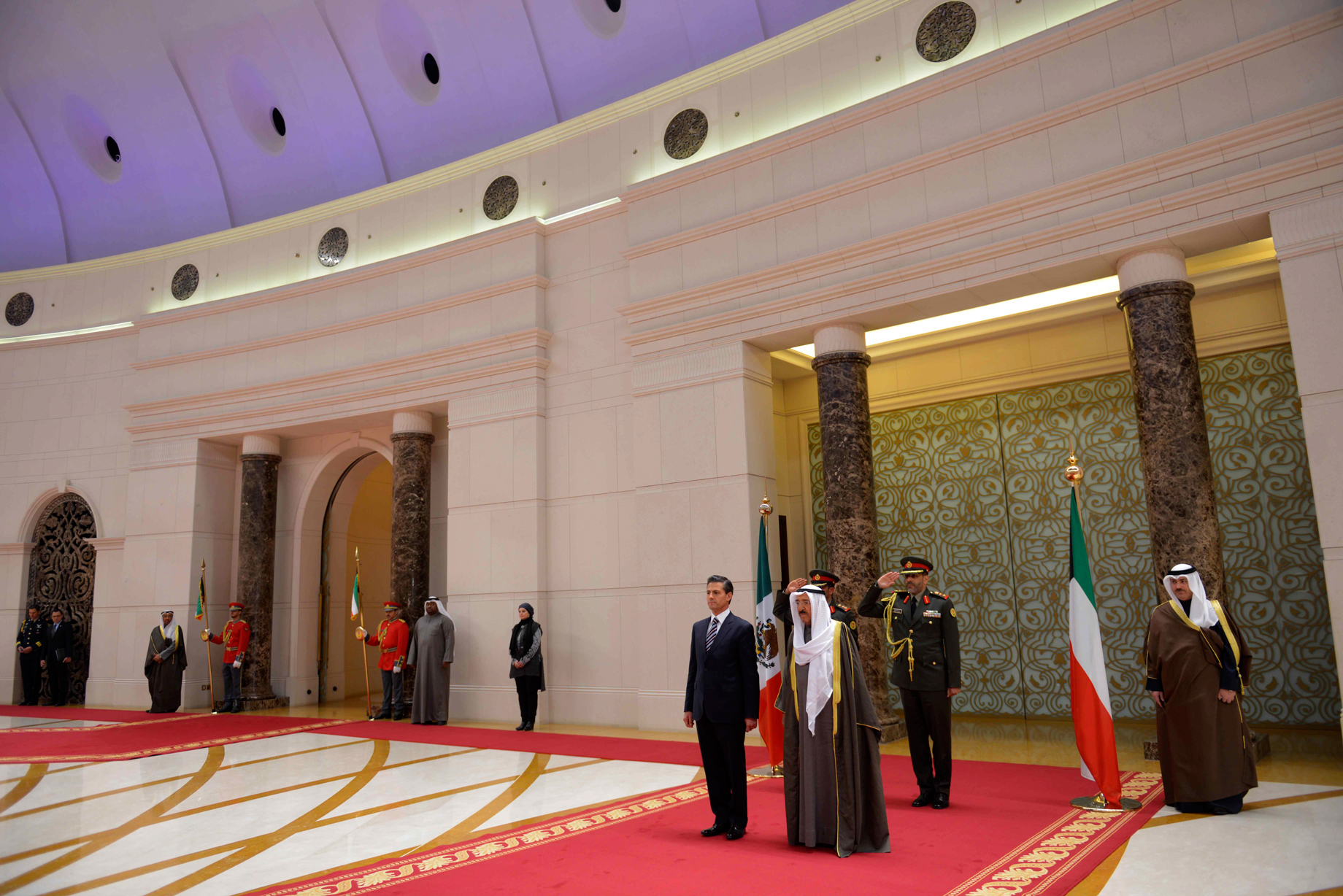
Mexican President Enrique Peña Nieto on a visit to Kuwait along with Emir Sabah Al-Ahmed Al-Jaber Al-Sabah; January 2016.

High-level visits from Kuwait to Mexico

- Prime Minister Nasser Al-Sabah (July and September 2010)
- Vice Minister of Interior Sulaiman Fahad Al Fahad (2016)

High-level visits from Mexico to Kuwait

- President Luis Echeverría (1975)
- Foreign Undersecretary Lourdes Aranda (2007, 2011)
- Foreign Secretary Patricia Espinosa (2011)
- Foreign Secretary José Antonio Meade (2014)
- Foreign Undersecretary Carlos de Icaza (2014)
- President Enrique Peña Nieto (2016)
- Foreign Secretary Claudia Ruiz Massieu (2016)

== Bilateral agreements ==
Both nations have signed several bilateral agreements such as an Agreement on Economic Cooperation (1976); Agreement to Avoid Double Taxation and Prevent Tax Evasion in the Matter of Income Taxes (2009); Agreement on the Promotion and Reciprocal Protection of Investments (2013); Agreement on Air Services (2016); Memorandum of Understanding in Health Cooperation (2016); Agreement of Cooperation in the Fields of Science and Technology (2016); Agreement of Cooperation between the National Bank of Foreign Trade (Bancomext) and the Kuwait Chamber of Commerce and Industry (2016); Agreement of Cooperation between Pemex and the Kuwait Petroleum Corporation (2016); and an Agreement on Cultural, Artistic and Superior Education Cooperation (2016).

== Trade ==
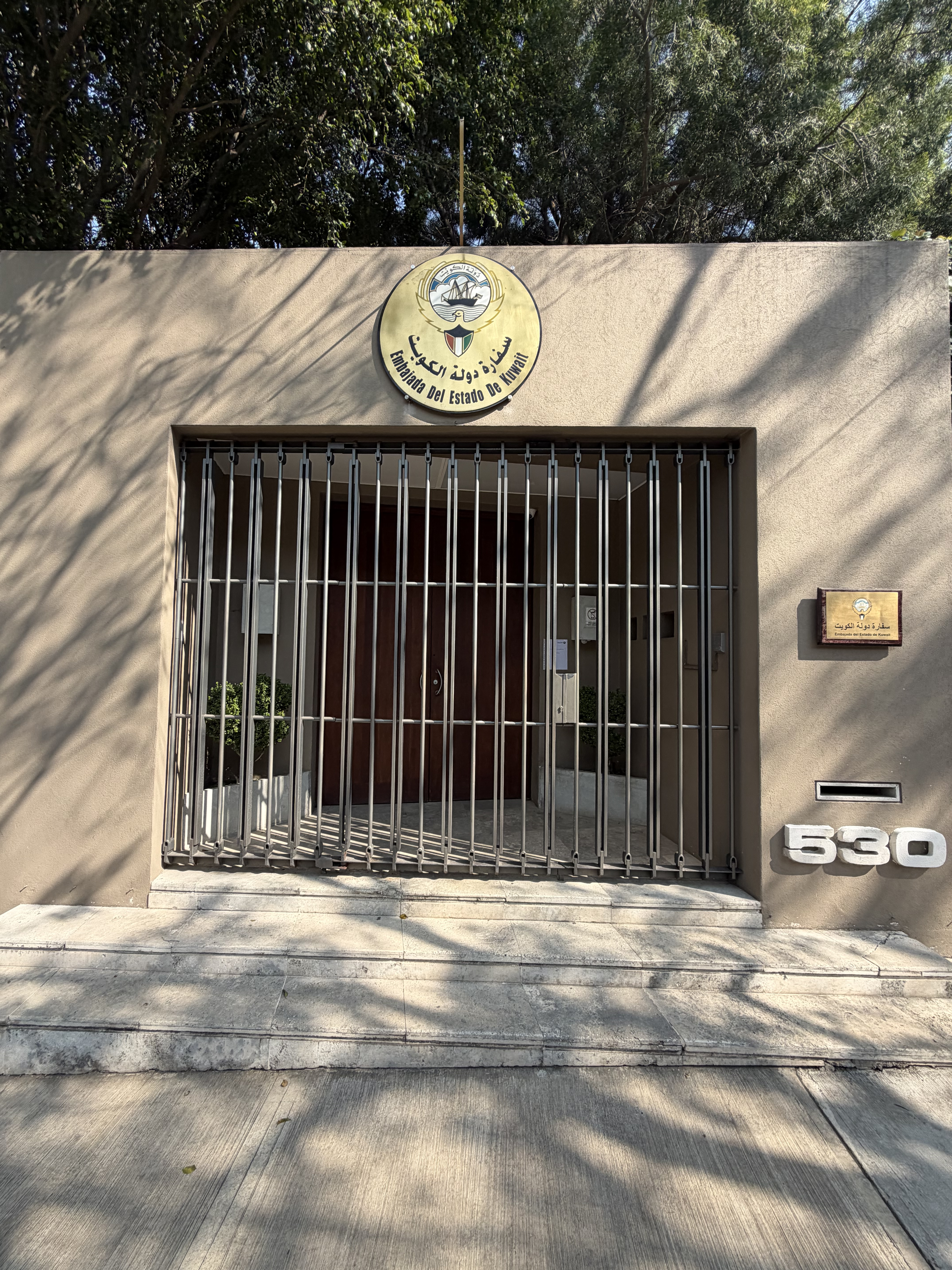
Embassy of Kuwait in Mexico City

In 2023, total trade between Kuwait and Mexico totaled US$130 million. Kuwait's main exports to Mexico is petroleum oil. Mexico's main exports to Kuwait include: motor vehicles for the transporte of goods and people, rubber tires, turbojets, turbo propellers and other gas turbines, machinery and mechanical appliances, tubes and pipes of iron or steel, chemical based products, vegetables, fruits, nuts, chocolates, and honey. Mexican multinational company KidZania operates in Kuwait.

== Resident diplomatic missions ==
- Kuwait has an embassy in Mexico City.
- Mexico has an embassy in Kuwait City.

== See also ==
- Foreign relations of Kuwait
- Foreign relations of Mexico
