= Embassy of India, Kuwait City =

Diplomatic mission of India to Kuwait

- Address: Diplomatic Enclave, Arabian Gulf Street, P O Box No.1450, Safat 13015, Kuwait City
- Coordinates: 29.3648863°N 48.0185522°E
- Ambassador: Paramita Tripathi
- Jurisdiction: Kuwait
- Website: Official website

The Embassy of India in Kuwait City is a diplomatic mission of the Republic of India to Kuwait.

== Leadership ==
Ambassador is in charge of the embassy. Paramita Tripathi is the current Ambassador of India to Kuwait.

== Jurisdiction ==
Embassy serves Kuwait region.

== Education ==
Scholarships are offered by the embassy to local nationals to study in India.

== See also ==
- India–Kuwait relations
- List of diplomatic missions in Kuwait
- List of diplomatic missions of India
