= Kuwait–Peru relations =

- Kuwait: Peru

Diplomatic mission
- None (Accredited from Santiago): Embassy of Peru, Kuwait

Kuwait–Peru relations are the bilateral relations between Kuwait and Peru. Both countries are members of the Non-Aligned Movement, the World Trade Organization and the United Nations.

Relations were established in 1975, but were interrupted by the Gulf War until their renewal in 2011. Since their renewal, relations have gained momentum due to increased cooperation between both countries.

== History ==
Both countries established relations on December 1, 1975. Peru's first embassy in the Middle East was opened in July 1989 in Kuwait City. The embassy had to be closed on February 12, 1990, amid souring relations between Iraq and Kuwait. Shortly after, Iraq invaded Kuwait on August 2, establishing a puppet government prior to the state's annexation, beginning the Gulf War. During this period, Sheikh Jaber Al-Ahmad Al-Sabah established a government-in-exile in the Saudi city of Taif. This meant that, from 1990 to 2009, Peruvian relations with Kuwait were limited to official communiqués congratulating the state on its national day. On the first day of the invasion, Peru condemned the invasion and supported Kuwait via diplomatic efforts, both at a national level and through the work of then Secretary General of the United Nations, Javier Pérez de Cuéllar, who visited Baghdad twice in 1990 and 1991.

Relations were renewed and elevated to embassy level in 2011. Both countries agreed to open embassies in their respective countries, however, as of 2023, only Peru has a diplomatic mission resident in Kuwait since 2011, while Kuwait is accredited to Peru from its embassy in Chile. A year later, a Kuwaiti delegation visited the Summit of South American-Arab Countries held in Lima.

== High-level visits ==
High-level visits from Peru to Kuwait

- Foreign Minister José Antonio García Belaúnde (2009)
- Vice-Foreign Minister José Beraún (2012)

== Trade ==
Trade between both countries has steadily increased since the renewal of relations. In 2019, Kuwait was Peru's 12th trading partner in the Arab world, with direct trade valued at US$ 1,7 million. However, many Peruvian exports also end in Kuwait, first passing through neighbouring countries, such as the United Arab Emirates.

As of 2023, Peru is seeking to invest in the country's agricultural sector, and is also negotiating the abolition of the travel visa for Kuwaiti citizens.

== Resident diplomatic missions ==
- Kuwait is accredited to Peru from its embassy in Santiago.
- Peru has an embassy in Kuwait City.

== See also ==
- Foreign relations of Kuwait
- Foreign relations of Peru
- List of ambassadors of Peru to Kuwait
