= Kuwait–Qatar relations =

- Qatar: Kuwait

Qatar has an embassy in Kuwait City, and Kuwait has an embassy in Doha. Both countries are part of the Middle East region and share close cultural and historical ties.

== History ==
Both were among the six countries who formed the Gulf Cooperation Council (GCC) in 1981 for diplomatic and economic cooperation.

In 1990, at the beginning of the Gulf War, Qatar was among the Arab countries to condemn Iraq's occupation of Kuwait. It also pledged military support to Kuwait. Qatari soldiers participated in the Battle of Khafji, the first major ground engagement in the Gulf War.

Amir Sabah Al-Sabah was recognized as chief mediator of the 2017 Qatari diplomatic crisis. Kuwait's neutrality and good relations with both parties were the main reasons behind its status as mediator.

In 2020, Qatar and Kuwait signed a 15-year sale and purchase agreement for the supply of up to 3 million tonnes of liquefied natural gas to Kuwait per year.

On 20 February 2024, Sheikh Tamim bin Hamad Al Thani and Mishal Al Ahmad Al Jaber Al Sabah met in Doha for the first time since the latter became the new Emir of Kuwait in December 2023. They discussed bilateral relations, the upcoming meeting of the GCC in Qatar, and the Gaza humanitarian crisis.

== Resident diplomatic missions ==
- Kuwait has an embassy in Doha.
- Qatar has an embassy in Kuwait City.

== See also ==
- Foreign relations of Kuwait
- Foreign relations of Qatar
