= Kuwait–Syria relations =

- Kuwait: Syria

Kuwait and Syria established diplomatic relations on 24 October 1963. Syria has an embassy in Kuwait City. Kuwait has an embassy in Damascus. Both countries are members of the Arab League, Non-Aligned Movement and Group of 77.

== History ==
=== Gulf War ===
Syria was a major Coalition belligerent in the Gulf War and even participated in the Liberation of Kuwait which led to two decades of goodwill and warm relations between the two countries. However, after the death of Hafez al-Assad and the beginning of Bashar al-Assad's presidency, Syria and Iraq entered a short period of rapprochement, Syria also noticeably deeply against the 2003 invasion of Iraq and subsequent Iraq War, however Kuwait was the only Arab country not to condemn the United States's war on Iraq.

=== Syrian Civil War ===
Kuwait–Syria relations became somewhat strained due to the Syrian Civil War after Kuwait closed its embassies along with the rest of the Arab States of the Persian Gulf. Bilaterial relations have since come to focus on humanitarian efforts for Syria instead. For example, Kuwait hosted three international pledging conferences in 2013, 2014, 2015, and 2016 raising 1.5bn, 2.4bn, 3.8bn, and 10bn respectively.

While countries like the United Arab Emirates and Saudi Arabia have begun to normalize relations with Syria's Assad, Kuwait has remained weary. In December 2018, Kuwaiti media obtained a list of terrorists and suspected financiers of terrorism in Syria, drafted by the Syrian government, which included Kuwaiti Islamic Salafi Alliance and Muslim Brotherhood politicians. This included high level officials such as the Deputy Foreign Minister al-Jarallah and 30 Kuwaiti then-MPs. Kuwait was one of the countries who did not want Ba'athist Syria to join the Arab League, a position held by Qatar and Morocco.

=== Post-Assad ===
Following the fall of the Assad regime, Kuwait's Minister of Foreign Affairs, Abdullah Al Yahya, and GCC Secretary general, Jasem Mohamed Al-Budaiwi, met with Ahmed al-Sharaa, leader of Hay'at Tahrir al-Sham, in Damascus on 30 December 2024, in which they expressed support for Syria's independence, sovereignty, and unity. Additionally, a plane carrying 20 million tonnes of relief goods was delivered to support the Syrian people.

== See also ==
- Foreign relations of Kuwait
- Foreign relations of Syria
- Syrians in Kuwait
