= Germany–Kuwait relations =

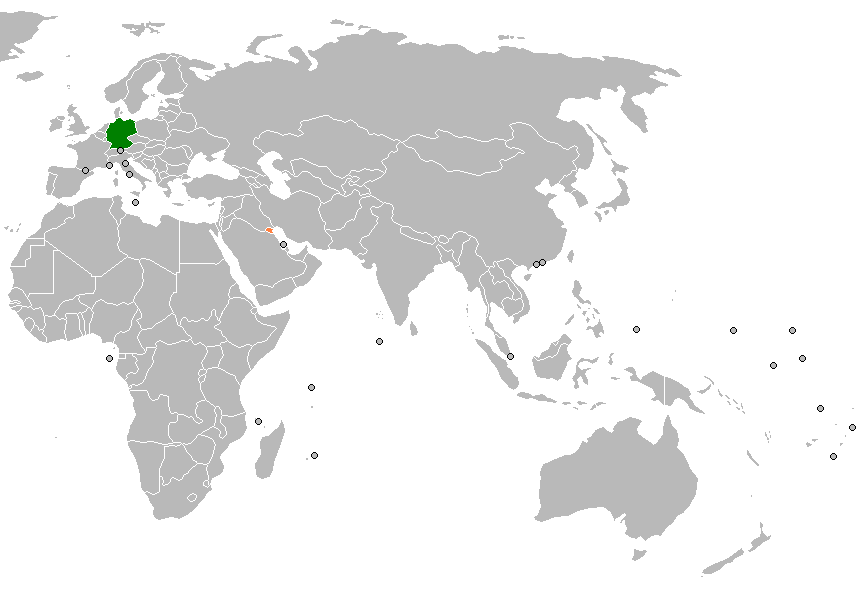

- Germany: Kuwait

As a country with traditionally strong contacts in the Arab world, Germany enjoys a good relationship with Kuwait. Among the EU states, Germany is Kuwait's most important trading partner.

== History ==
Kuwait gained independence from the United Kingdom on June 19, 1961. West Germany opened a consulate in Kuwait on November 4, 1963, which was upgraded to a consulate general on June 7, 1971. On February 3, 1973, the representation was converted into an embassy. East Germany also established diplomatic relations with Kuwait in the 1970s and was represented by its own embassy in the country after 1972. In 1982, Erich Honecker, the leader of East Germany, visited Kuwait. During the Iraqi invasion of Kuwait in the Gulf War, the GDR embassy, which was already in the process of being liquidated as part of German reunification, served as a place of refuge for German citizens in Kuwait. They were later taken to Baghdad, detained there, and eventually brought home through the mediation of Willy Brandt.

In 2007, the two countries signed an agreement to strengthen cooperation in security policy. Three years later, Emir Sabah Al-Ahmad Al-Jaber Al-Sabah visited Germany, marking a high point in bilateral relations. German President Christian Wulff visited to participate in celebrations marking the 50th anniversary of Kuwait's independence in 2011. German Foreign Minister Heiko Maas signed a memorandum of understanding to further intensify bilateral relations in 2018.

== Economic relations ==
The total volume of trade with Kuwait amounted to €1.0 billion in 2021, putting Kuwait in 79th place in the ranking of Germany's trading partners. As Kuwait is one of the richest countries in the Arab world, it is a notable buyer of German goods and mostly imports industrial and chemical products from Germany. Due to the relatively affluent market, more than 700 brands and companies from Germany are represented in Kuwait. At the same time, Kuwait is an investor in major listed German companies through its sovereign wealth fund, like Mercedes-Benz and GEA.

There has been an investment promotion agreement between the two countries since 1997 and a double taxation agreement since 2000.

== Cultural relations ==
The two countries signed a bilateral cultural agreement in 1989. Since 2009, Kuwaiti students have had the opportunity to study in Germany as part of an exchange program. There was a German school in Kuwait, which was not reopened after the Iraqi invasion. In 2016, a U.S.-German school was opened in Kuwait, where U.S. curriculum is taught in German, Arabic, and English.

== Military relations ==
German defense companies supplied various weapons to Kuwait, including fighter jets (2016), helicopters (2016), grenade weapons (2008), and submachine guns (2003).

== Diplomatic missions ==
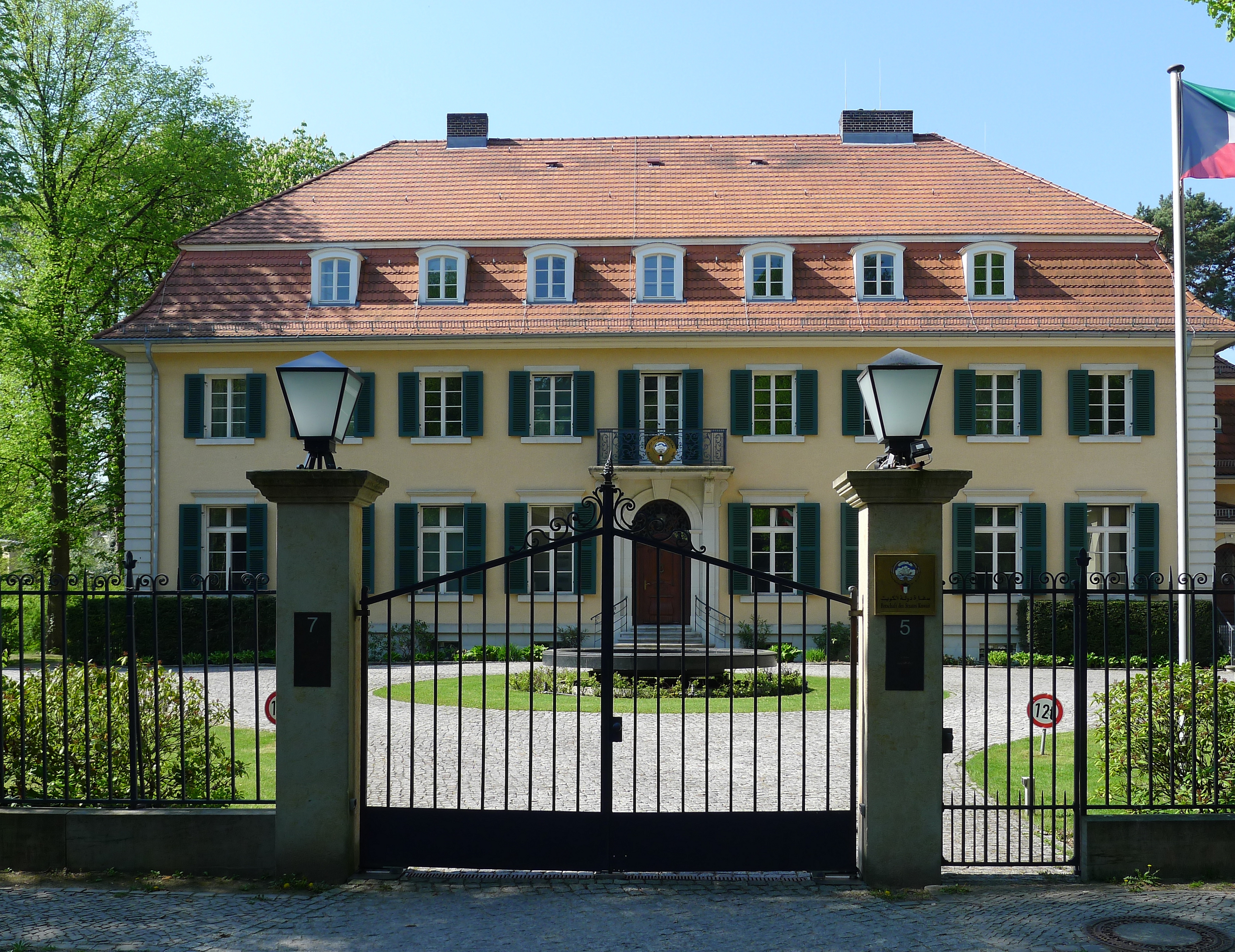
Embassy of Kuwait, Berlin

- Germany has an embassy in Kuwait City.
- Kuwait has an embassy in Berlin.

== See also ==
- Foreign relations of Germany
- Foreign relations of Kuwait
