= Kenya–Kuwait relations =

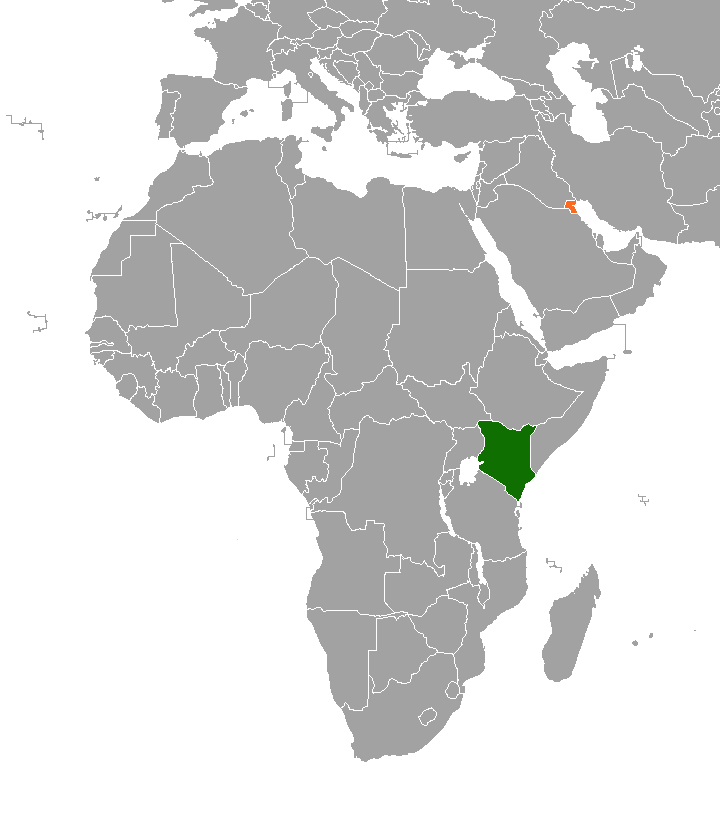

- Kenya: Kuwait

Kenya–Kuwait relations are the bilateral relations between Kenya and Kuwait.

== History ==
President Uhuru Kenyatta visited Kuwait in 2013. He held talks with Emir of Kuwait, Sheikh Sabah Al-Ahmad Al-Jaber Al-Sabah. Kenyatta also attended the 3rd Africa-Arab economic summit which was held in Kuwait. The Kenyan Cabinet Secretary for Foreign Affairs, Amina Mohamed also accompanied him.

While addressing the 68th UN General Assembly, the Prime Minister of Kuwait, Sheikh Jaber Al-Mubarak Al-Hamad Al-Sabah, condemned the terror attacks that had happened in Kenya. He also expressed his condolences to what he referred to as the friendly people of Kenya.

== Development cooperation ==
Kenya and Kuwait cooperate in a lot of areas. During the Iraqi invasion of Kuwait, Kenya sent troops to Kuwait who later stayed on as peace keeping troops.

Between 2007 and 2013, Kenya has received aid amounting to KES. 7 billion (EUR. 68 million) from Kuwait.

Key areas for Kenya and Kuwaiti cooperation are:

- Infrastructure
- Health
- Education

Kuwait has helped fund the Nuno-Modogashe Road, rehabilitation of Wajir Hospital and schools in Borabu, Nyamira. Kuwaiti NGOs set up Umma University in Kajiado and a college in Thika.

Kuwait recognises that Kenya plays a key role in regional stability.

During a drought in February 2022, Kuwait sent 34 tons of food to Mandera including rice, cooking oil, beans, and salt.

== Economic relations ==
In 2012, both countries signed a double tax avoidance and protection of investments agreement. Other agreements signed include promotion of tourism and establishment of a joint commission of cooperation.

Both countries are working on restarting trade and establishing direct flights.

== Diplomatic missions ==
Kenya has an embassy in Kuwait City. It was established in 2007. Kuwait has an embassy in Nairobi. It was opened in 1965 and the first ambassador appointed in 1968.
