= India–Kuwait relations =

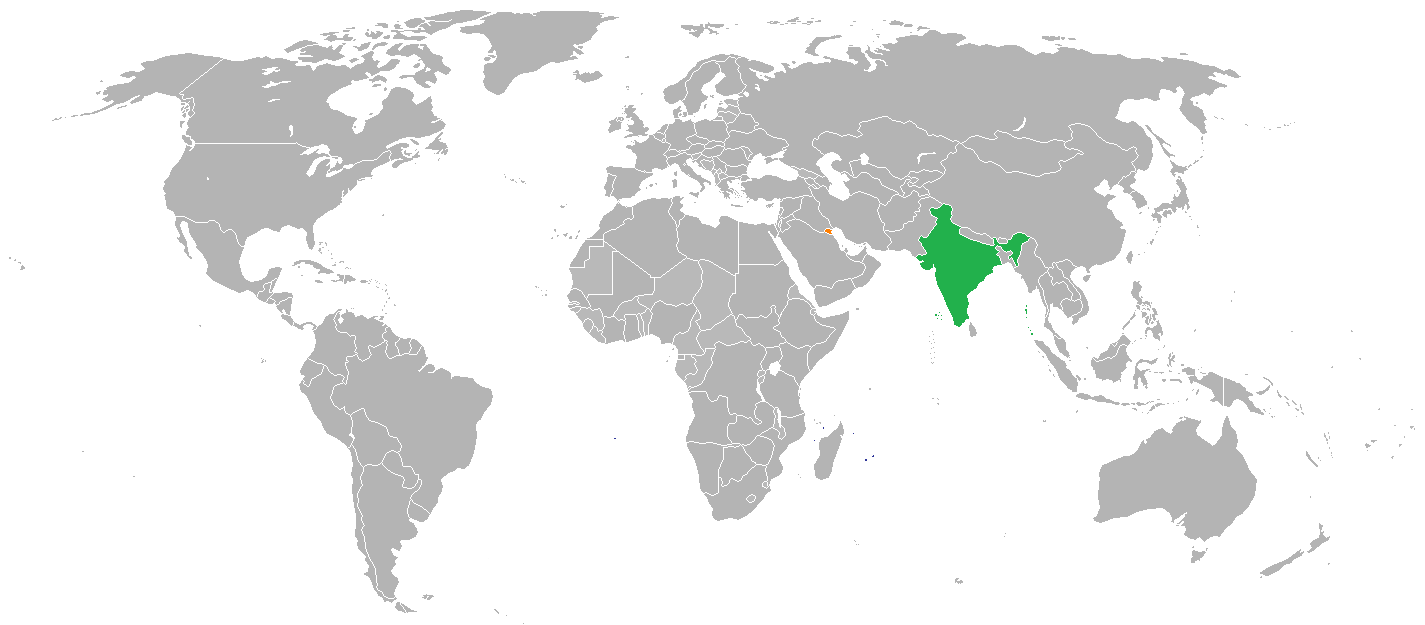

- India: Kuwait

Diplomatic mission
- Embassy of India, Kuwait City, Kuwait: Embassy of Kuwait, New Delhi, India

Envoy
- Indian Ambassador to Kuwait Paramita Tripathi: Kuwaiti Ambassador to India Mishal Mustafa Al-Shemali

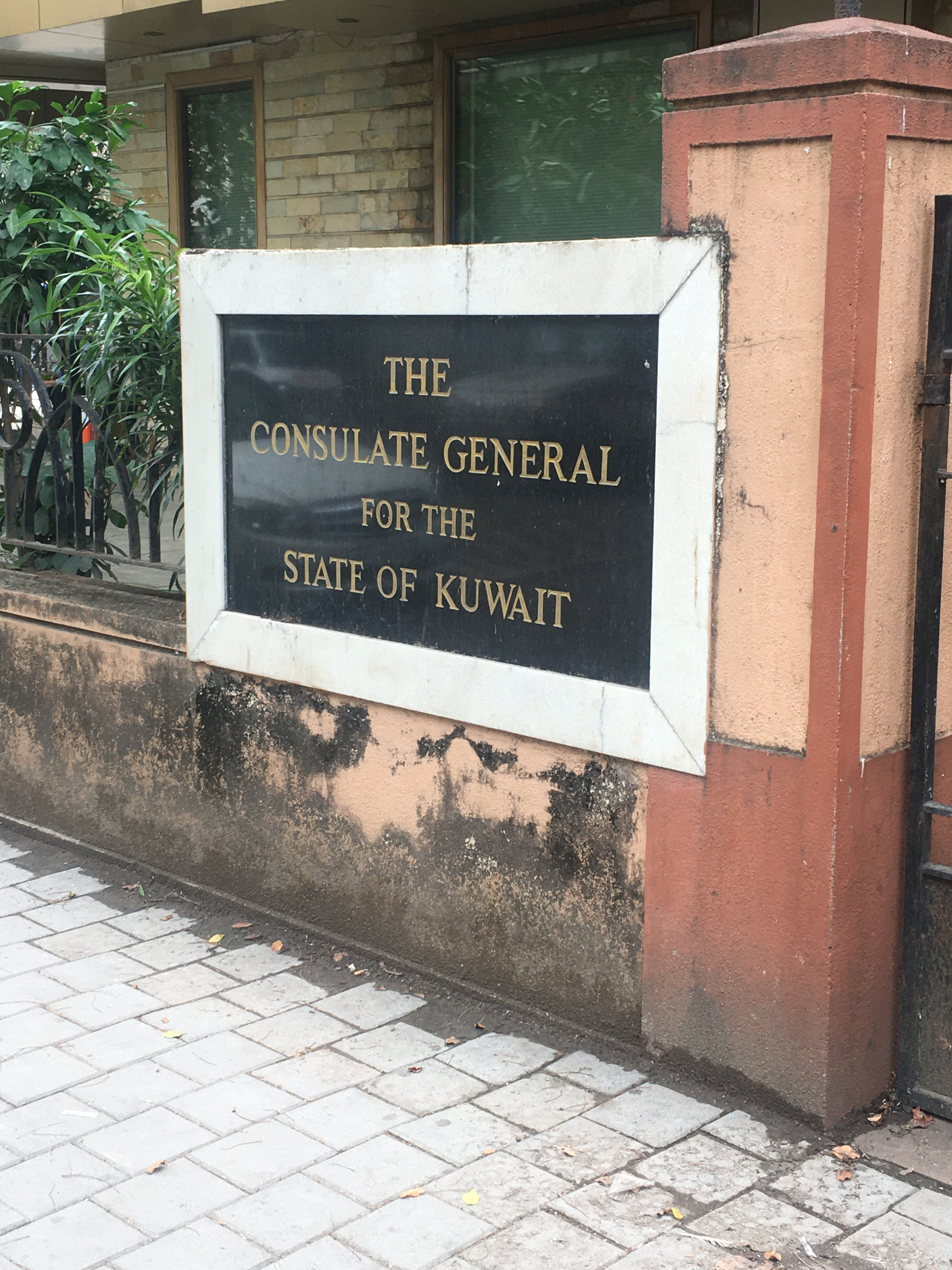
Office of the Consul General of Kuwait in Mumbai

India–Kuwait relations are bilateral diplomatic relations between the Republic of India and the State of Kuwait. The two countries share friendly ties. Kuwait houses a large expatriate Indian population and is the source for 10–12% of India's oil imports while India is among the largest trade partners of Kuwait.

== History ==
The recent discovery of artefacts such as pottery and jewellery from the Kuwaiti island of Failaka points to commercial and cultural interaction between the two countries dating back several millennia. Prior to the discovery of oil in Kuwait, Indo–Kuwait trade revolved around dates and pedigreed horses, with Kuwaiti sailors making annual trips between the Shatt-al-Arab and the western ports of India to conduct the trade. The horse trade was ended in 1945 after World War II, following which trade turned to pearls and teak-wood.

Diplomatic relations between the countries began in June 1962 with the appointment of Yacoub Abdulaziz al-Rushaid as the first Kuwaiti Ambassador to India. India was among the earliest countries to recognise Kuwaiti independence while Kuwait was one of the first countries to extend support to India during the war with China in 1962. During the 1950s and 1960s Bombay was a hub for many Kuwaiti businesses and the emir himself maintained a house there on the Marine Drive. While relations between the countries have traditionally been warm, they were strained in the early 1990s due to India's pro-Iraq stance following Iraq's invasion of Kuwait. India declined an audience to the Kuwaiti ambassador in New Delhi, sided with Iraq during the Gulf War and became the only country to shift its embassy from Kuwait to Basra during the war. The demolition of the 16th-century Babri Masjid by extremists in India also impacted ties, with Kuwait calling for Prime Minister Narasimha Rao to rebuild the structure and hand it over to Indian Muslims. The Government of Kuwait however was quick to act against calls for dismissing Hindu employees from Kuwaiti firms and for shutting shops to protest against India in retaliation for the historic mosque's demolition. In 1992, the External Affairs Minister Madhavsinh Solanki pulled off a "diplomatic triumph" on his visit to Kuwait that helped overcome the strains that had crept into bilateral ties. In 1994, the Kuwait government struck down a proposal in the Kuwait National Assembly that called for a ban on entry and recruitment of Hindu workers in Kuwait to prevent any worsening of relations with a "friendly India".

=== Bilateral visits ===
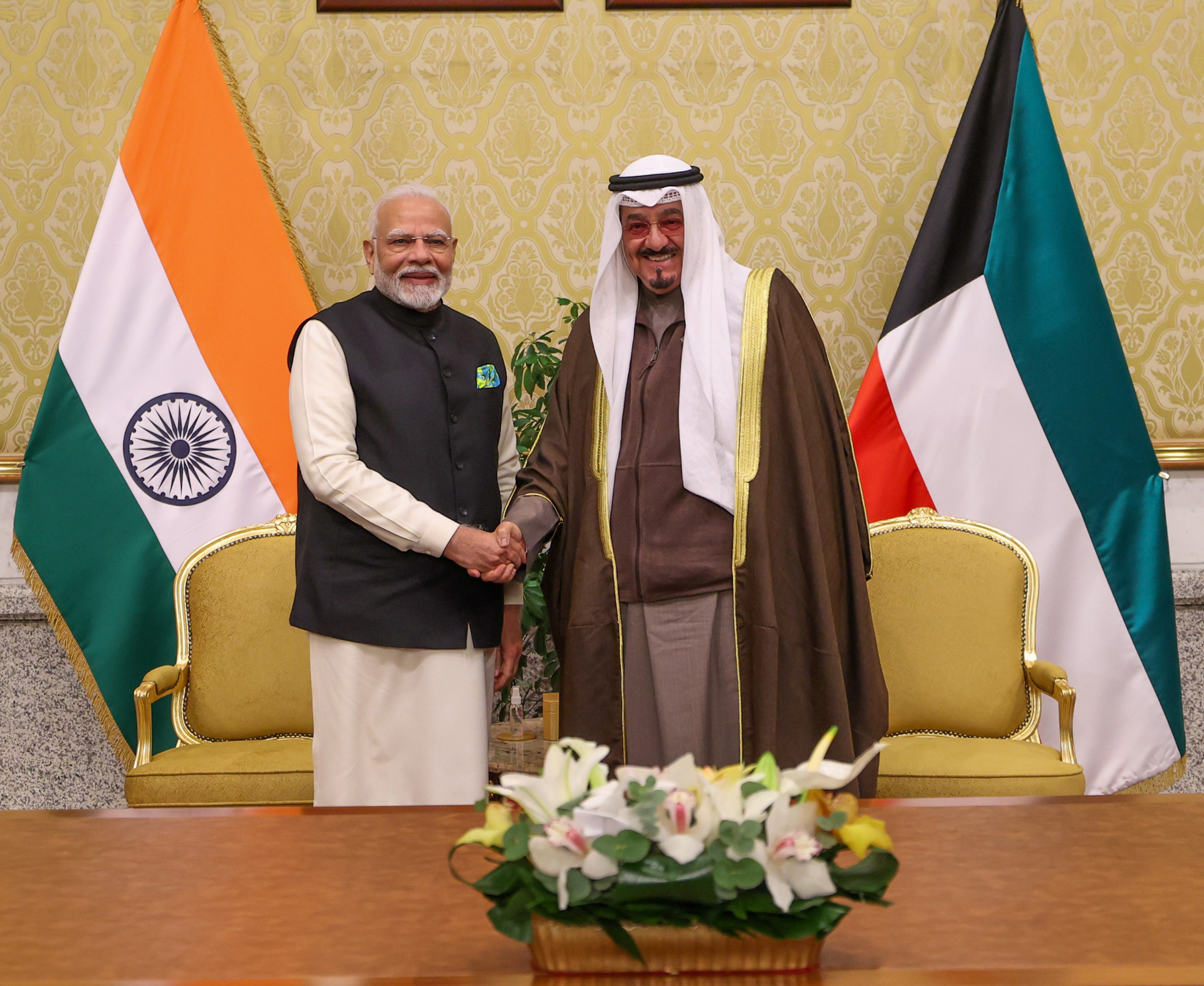
Prime Minister of India Narendra Modi and Prime Minister of Kuwait Ahmad Al-Abdullah Al-Sabah

There has been regular high level bilateral state visits between the two countries. Vice-presidents of India, Dr Zakir Husain in 1965 and Hamid Ansari in 2009 and Prime Minister Indira Gandhi in 1981 have led Indian visits to Kuwait while the Crown Prince and Prime Minister Sheikh Sabah Al-Salem Al-Sabah in 1964, the Emir Sheikh Jaber Al-Ahmed Al-Jaber Al-Sabah in 1980 and 1983 and the Emir Sheikh Sabah Al-Ahmed Al-Jaber Al-Sabah in 2006 have led state visits from Kuwait to India. Prime Minister Narendra Modi made an official state visit to Kuwait on 21–22 December 2024. The trip marked the first official visit by an Indian prime minister to the country in 43 years, following Indira Gandhi's visit in 1981.

== Indians in Kuwait ==
Indians form one of the largest expatriate communities in Kuwait numbering about 640,000 people. Their presence in white collar jobs have been increasing consistently especially in the electronic, industrial, architectural and engineering sectors. Kuwait's Ministry of Health also employs a significant number of Indian medics and paramedics. Indians have been described by the Emir's special envoy as having acquired a special space in Kuwait as "a brilliant and the least problematic expatriate community which works for the overall development of Kuwait". There are however a large number of Indians working in low paying jobs and in 2011 as many as 22,000 Indians were found to be staying illegally in Kuwait and the Indian embassy in Kuwait facilitated the departure of 12,825 Indian nationals to India following the declaration of an Amnesty in Kuwait. Indians in Kuwait remit over US$3 billion annually to India and Kuwait is home to 300 Indian associations and 18 Indian schools affiliated to the Central Board of Secondary Education, New Delhi.

== Economic relations ==
=== Trade ===
The Kuwaiti economy, before the discovery of oil, depended heavily on maritime activities and trade. Kuwait was a centre for ship-building and pearl diving and fishing were important commercial activities. Until 1961 the Indian Rupee was the legal tender in Kuwait and Indo–Kuwaiti commerce revolved around trade in agricultural goods, textiles and horses.

In 2011–12, bilateral trade amounted to US$17.56 billion, marking a 44% rise over the previous year. Petroleum accounts for the bulk of the trade, with the non-oil trade accounting for only US$1.9 billion. The balance of trade is heavily in favour of Kuwait with Indian exports to Kuwait amounting to a mere US$1.1 billion in 2011–12. Petroleum imports worth US$15.67 billion from Kuwait makes it India's second largest supplier of oil from the GCC countries next only to Saudi Arabia. Indian exports to Kuwait in 2011–12 consisted of value added goods such as iron and steel products, boilers, machinery and mechanical appliances, electrical machinery and equipment and food items. Kuwait is India's third largest trade partner in the Arab world and it accounted for 3.34% of India's global imports in 2011. India is however Kuwait's second largest export market and its fifth largest source of imports and has consistently been among the top ten trading partners of Kuwait with bilateral trade doubling to US$17.5 billion in 2011–12 from US$8.35 billion in 2007–08.

In year 2022–2023, Commercially, growth can be seen in economic and trade cooperation between the two countries with bilateral trade amounting to US$13.8 billion for the period 2022-2023 recording its highest levels ever, with an increase of 12.8% on an annual basis.

In 2024, bilateral trade between India and Kuwait reached $10.72 billion, resulting in a $5.94 billion trade deficit for India. Indian exports totaled $2.39 billion, led by aircraft and spacecraft ($525 million), while imports from Kuwait reached $8.33 billion, dominated by crude petroleum ($3.09 billion).

=== Investments ===
Indian public sector companies in the insurance and aviation sectors have offices in Kuwait, while private companies including Larsen & Toubro, Punj Lloyd and Kalpataru have implemented major projects in Kuwait including in its petroleum and power sectors. The Al-Ghanim Group, the KAPICO group, Global Investment House and Kuwait Finance House are the important Kuwaiti companies in India. India has in recent years mooted joint-venture projects between the two countries towards establishing new facilities in the oil and gas sector in both countries, while Kuwait has welcomed Indian companies to bid for projects in Kuwait as it undertakes a massive infrastructure development programme.

== Technical cooperation ==
India and Kuwait have signed several agreements relating to scientific and technological cooperation including medical cooperation and in the areas of culture and education. There are also agreements between Indian and Kuwaiti institutions of higher education and research and agreements on avoidance of Double Taxation, drug reduction and prevention of illicit trafficking in narcotic drugs and programmes for cultural and information exchanges between Kuwait and India.

== Defence cooperation ==
The defence and security relations have so far been limited to training and medical cooperation with Bilateral naval cooperation continuing to be the main element of defence cooperation. Four Indian naval ships visited Kuwait in July and October in the year 2022. On 14 August 2023, Indian Ambassador to Kuwait Adarsh Swaika, called on the Naval Chief of Kuwait Brigadier General Hazza Al-Alati and held discussions on strengthening Navy-to-Navy cooperation between India and Kuwait. On 19 August 2023 Indian Navy's indigenously built destroyer, INS Visakhapatnam docked at Al-Shuwaikh Port adding a new chapter to the bilateral navy-to-navy cooperation between India and Kuwait. The ship's visit was in continuation of the increased maritime cooperation witnessed during 2021 when five Indian naval ships visited Kuwait for transporting liquid medical oxygen. It was followed by a visit of INS TEG in July 2022 and three ships from First Training Squadron having a port of call in Kuwait in October 2022. On 22 August 2023, there will be a PASSEX conducted with Kuwait navy.On 28 August 2026, India and Kuwait held the inaugural meeting of the Joint Defence Committee in New Delhi, agreeing to strengthen defence cooperation in areas including training, military exercises, military medicine, staff talks, defence industry and research and development. The meeting followed the 2024 India–Kuwait memorandum of understanding on defence cooperation.

== Healthcare ==
During the COVID-19 pandemic, in May 2020, the Indian Government sent a 15-member rapid response team and provided medical supplies to combat the pandemic. Kuwait also provided urgent medical assistance to India including Liquid Medical Oxygen, Oxygen concentrators and ventilators in during the second wave of COVID-19 in India during May 2021.

== See also ==
- Indians in Kuwait
- Embassy of India, Kuwait City
