= Kuwait–United Kingdom relations =

- Kuwait: United Kingdom

Kuwait–United Kingdom relations refer to the bilateral ties between the State of Kuwait and the United Kingdom. The two countries have enjoyed a long-standing relationship marked by close political, economic, and military cooperation. Historically, Kuwait was a British protectorate from the late 19th century until 1961, and the UK played a significant role in Kuwait’s security and development. In the modern era, Britain was a key contributor to the coalition that liberated Kuwait in the Gulf War of 1991, and today the countries maintain strong trade links and defense partnerships. Both nations regularly engage in high-level visits and joint initiatives, and 2024 marked 125 years since the establishment of official diplomatic relations.

== History ==
=== Early history ===
British interest in Kuwait dates back to the 19th century, when the British Empire sought to secure trade routes and counter other powers’ influence in the Persian Gulf. During the 1800s, Kuwait was an autonomous sheikhdom nominally under Ottoman suzerainty, but it attracted British attention due to its strategic port and location. By the late 1890s, Britain became concerned about Ottoman and German plans (such as the proposed Berlin–Baghdad railway) and saw Kuwait as strategically important.This culminated in the Anglo-Kuwaiti Agreement of 1899, a secret treaty signed by Sheikh Mubarak Al-Sabah and British representative Colonel Malcolm Meade. Under the 1899 agreement, the Kuwaiti ruler agreed not to cede any territory or receive foreign agents without British consent, effectively placing Kuwait under British protection in exchange for an annual subsidy and security guarantees.

=== British Kuwait ===
Following the 1899 agreement, Kuwait came under British informal protectorate status, with Britain managing its foreign affairs and providing defense support. In 1903, Britain established a political office in Kuwait, and a further Anglo-Kuwaiti convention in 1907 reinforced the arrangements. The Ottoman Empire’s tentative recognition of Kuwait’s autonomy in 1913 (through an unratified Anglo-Ottoman agreement) confirmed Kuwait’s special status, but with the onset of World War I, the British declared Kuwait an independent sheikhdom under their protection. Britain also helped define Kuwait’s borders, signing an agreement with Ibn Saud in 1915 to delineate the Kuwait–Saudi boundary (although final demarcation was left unresolved).

During the first half of the 20th century, Kuwait’s security and foreign policy were under British guidance. Kuwait’s increasing oil wealth (the Kuwait Oil Company was formed in 1934 by BP and Gulf Oil) bolstered its importance to Britain. There were occasional challenges to Kuwait’s status – notably in 1938, when Iraq’s King Ghazi and other Iraqi nationalists demanded the annexation of Kuwait, stirring unrest that was ultimately contained with British support. After World War II, Britain signaled its intent to reduce its direct commitments east of Suez, and plans were made for Kuwait’s eventual independence. On 19 June 1961, the State of Kuwait became fully independent, as the 1899 treaty was terminated by mutual consent. This ended over 60 years of British protective oversight in Kuwait.

=== Post-Independence Kuwait and the UK ===
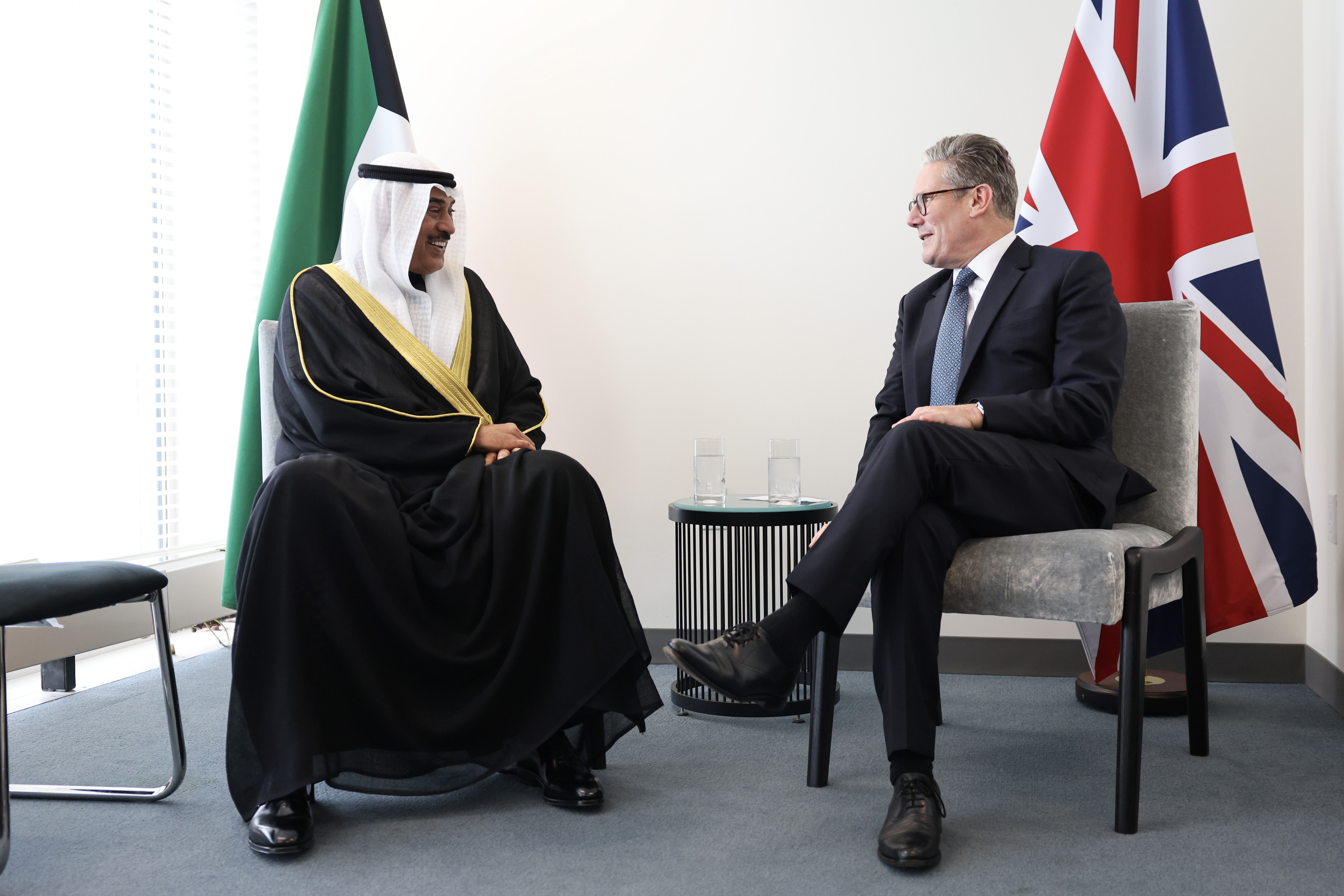
Prime Minister Keir Starmer with Crown Prince of Kuwait Sabah Al-Khalid Al-Sabah at a United Nations General Assembly in New York City, September 2024.

Shortly after independence in 1961, Kuwait faced a direct threat when Iraq’s leader Abdul-Karim Qasim claimed Kuwait as part of Iraq. In response, Kuwait invoked its defense understanding with Britain. The UK launched Operation Vantage in June 1961, airlifting troops to Kuwait at the Emir’s request to deter any Iraqi aggression. The swift British deployment helped secure Kuwait’s sovereignty until an Arab League force could take over peacekeeping later that year. In the following decades, Kuwait and the UK maintained a close friendship. The UK was among the first to establish full diplomatic relations, with Kuwait opening an embassy in London in late 1961. In the 1960s and 1970s, the US replaced Britain as the main protective power of the Arab Gulf states.

Kuwait’s ties with Britain were most dramatically demonstrated during the Gulf War (1990–91) after Iraq’s invasion of Kuwait. Britain was a principal member of the international coalition that came to Kuwait’s aid; about 35,000 British military personnel took part in the campaign to liberate Kuwait in 1991, the largest UK deployment since World War II. After liberation, Kuwait and the UK deepened their cooperation. The Kuwaiti leadership maintained strong diplomatic engagement with London, and in 2012 the Emir of Kuwait (Sheikh Sabah Al-Ahmad Al-Sabah) undertook a state visit to Britain, even addressing both Houses of Parliament during his visit. In 2012 the two governments also formed a Joint Steering Group to expand cooperation, a mechanism that continued into the 2020s. By 2023, Kuwait and the UK had upgraded their dialogue to a Strategic Partnership framework, holding an inaugural Strategic Dialogue to coordinate on defense, security, trade and cultural ties. In January 2024, both nations celebrated 125 years of friendship and official ties.

== Economic ties ==
Economic relations between Kuwait and the United Kingdom are robust and rooted in the oil industry as well as trade and investment. Oil has long been a cornerstone: the Kuwait Oil Company (KOC) was established in 1934 as a joint venture between Anglo-Persian (British Petroleum) and Gulf Oil, granting British interests a significant role in Kuwait’s petroleum sector. In the modern era, bilateral trade has grown substantially. Total trade in goods and services between the UK and Kuwait reached £6 billion in 2023, making Kuwait one of the UK’s top 50 trading partners. Kuwait’s exports to Britain are dominated by oil and refined petroleum products, while the UK exports a range of goods to Kuwait, including automobiles, industrial machinery, pharmaceuticals, and foodstuffs.

Investments form a key pillar of the economic relationship. Kuwait has been a major investor in the UK for decades; notably, the Kuwait Investment Office in London (the overseas arm of Kuwait’s sovereign wealth fund) was first established in 1953 and has since financed significant projects in Britain. Kuwaiti sovereign investments in British real estate, infrastructure, and companies have strengthened financial ties and made Kuwait an important investor in the UK economy. Conversely, British firms and financial institutions are active in Kuwait, contributing expertise in sectors such as consulting, banking, and energy services. Both governments have sought to enhance economic cooperation further; for example, in August 2023 the UK and Kuwait signed a new investment partnership agreement to facilitate Kuwaiti investment into priority UK sectors like education, renewable energy, life sciences, and technology.

Additionally, the United Kingdom is pursuing a free trade agreement with the Gulf Cooperation Council (of which Kuwait is a member) to boost trade flows – negotiations for a Gulf Cooperation Council–United Kingdom Free Trade Agreement were launched in 2022 and are ongoing.

== Military relations ==
The United Kingdom was instrumental in the liberation of Kuwait during the 1991 Gulf War, contributing around 35,000 troops as part of the coalition that expelled Iraqi occupying forces. British forces also utilized bases in Kuwait during the 1990s (for enforcing no-fly zones over southern Iraq) and in the 2003 Iraq war, underscoring Kuwait’s importance as a strategic ally in the region. In the present day, the two countries continue to collaborate closely on defense and security. The UK and Kuwait regularly conduct joint military exercises – for example, the recurring Desert Warrior exercises in Kuwait are held to improve interoperability and combat readiness between the Kuwaiti Armed Forces and British Army units. High-level defense dialogues are held periodically – including an annual Joint Steering Group and strategic consultations – to coordinate on issues like maritime security, counter-terrorism, and cybersecurity.

There are also training and exchange programs: as of late 2022, a number of Kuwaiti military personnel were stationed in the UK for liaison roles and to attend short-term training courses at British military academies and institutions. The UK provides training assistance and education to Kuwaiti officers, reflecting a long tradition (many Kuwaiti officers, including members of the ruling family, have attended British military colleges). Kuwait, for its part, has procured British and European defense equipment, such as the Eurofighter Typhoon combat aircraft (a project involving the UK’s BAE Systems) to modernize its air force.

== Diplomatic missions ==
- Kuwait has an embassy in London.
- the United Kingdom has an embassy in Kuwait City.
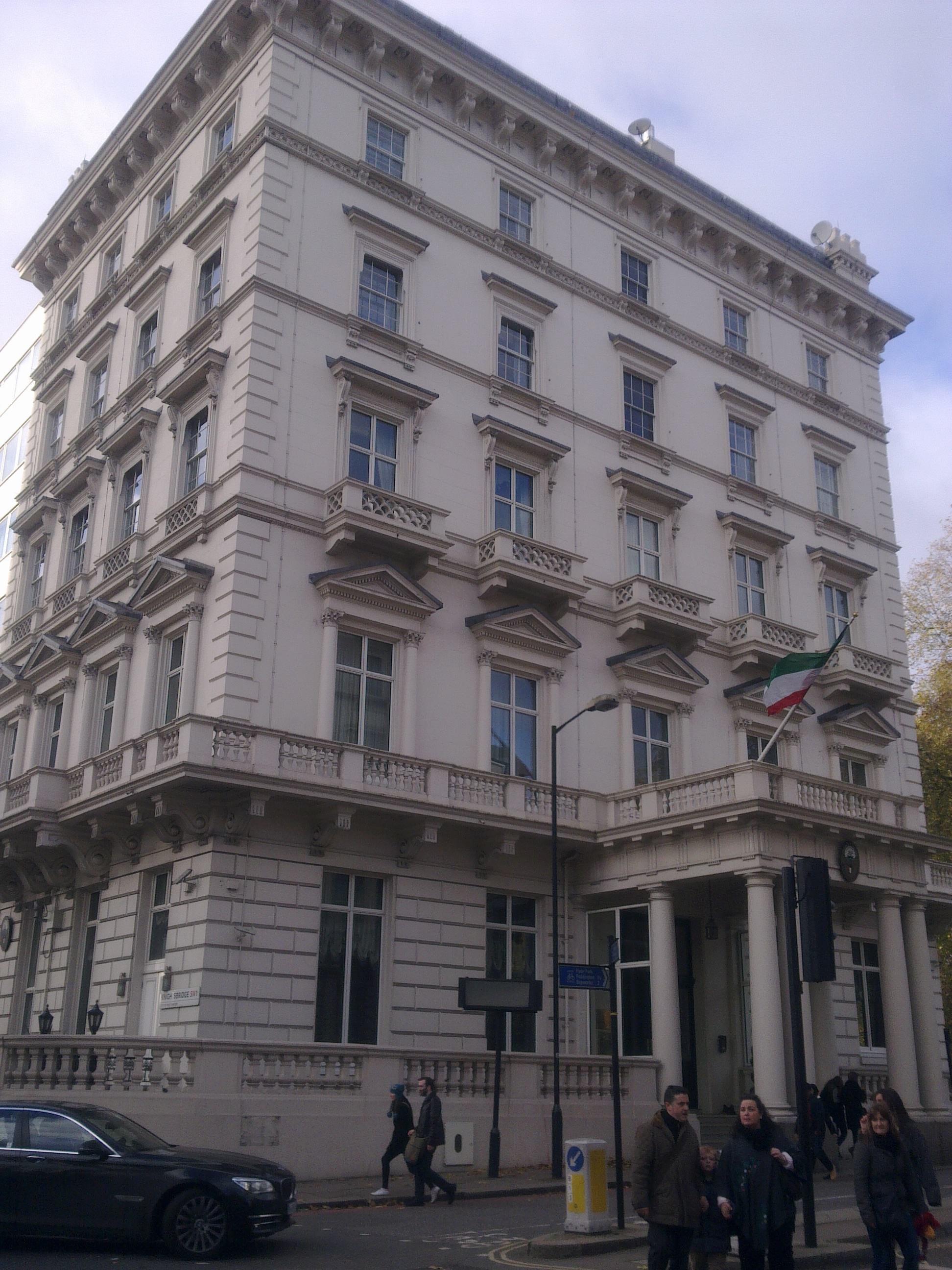
Kuwaiti embassy in London
