= List of members of the International Olympic Committee =

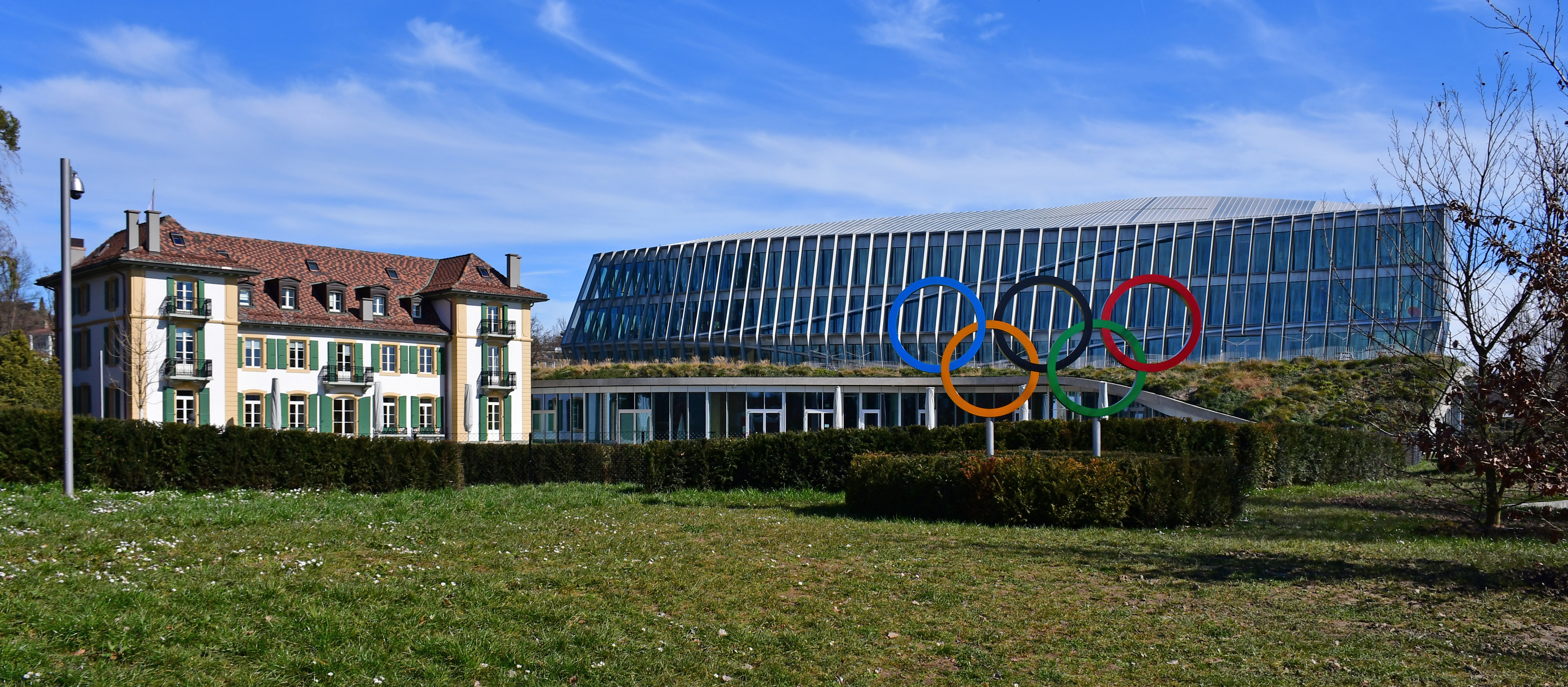
The headquarters of the International Olympic Committee in Lausanne, Switzerland

This is a list of members of the International Olympic Committee. According to the Olympic Charter, the members of the IOC "represent and promote the interests of the IOC and of the Olympic Movement in their countries and in the organisations of the Olympic Movement in which they serve". Currently, there are 104 members, 37 honorary members (1 suspended honorary member), one honorary President and two honour members.

== Current members ==
The chairperson of an international organization, who represents an Olympic sport (e.g. the chairman of World Athletics), is represented in the IOC "ex officio" (i.e., because of that position).

Member	Country	Since	Olympic participation (if any)	Ex officio	Notes
HSH the Princess Nora of Liechtenstein	Liechtenstein	1984			
HSH the Sovereign Prince Albert II	Monaco	1985	bobsleigh (1988–2002)		
Anita L. DeFrantz	United States	1986	rowing (1976)		
HRH The Princess Royal	Great Britain	1988	equestrianism (1976)		
Richard L. Carrión	Puerto Rico	1990			
Denis Oswald	Switzerland	1991	rowing (1968–1976)	WR (rowing)	Former president of World Rowing Federation (1989–2014)
Robin E. Mitchell	Fiji	1994			President of the Association of National Olympic Committees and former president of Oceania National Olympic Committees
Shamil Tarpishchev	Russia	1994			
Valeriy Borzov	Ukraine	1994	athletics (1972–1976)		
Syed Shahid Ali	Pakistan	1996			
Gunilla Lindberg	Sweden	1996			
Guy Drut	France	1996	athletics (1972–1976)		
HRH the Grand Duke Henri of Luxembourg	Luxembourg	1998			
Nawal El Moutawakel	Morocco	1998	athletics (1984)		
Ng Ser Miang	Singapore	1998			
Juan Antonio Samaranch	Spain	2001			
HH Emir Sheikh Tamim bin Hamad Al Thani	Qatar	2002			
Nicole Hoevertsz	Aruba	2006	synchronised swimming (1984)		Chair of the IOC Coordination Commission for the 2028 Summer Olympics
Sergey Bubka	Ukraine	2008	athletics (1988–2000)		
Lydia Nsekera	Burundi	2009			
HRH Prince Faisal Al Hussein	Jordan	2010			
Gerardo Werthein	Argentina	2011			
Li Lingwei	China	2012			
Baron Pierre-Olivier Beckers-Vieujant	Belgium	2012			Chair of the IOC Coordination Commission for the 2030 Winter Olympics
Aïcha Garad Ali	Djibouti	2012			
Kirsty Coventry	Zimbabwe	2013	swimming (2000–2016)		President since 2025. Former chair of the IOC Athletes' Commission. Elected to full membership in 2021.
Octavian Morariu	Romania	2013			
Bernard Rajzman	Brazil	2013	volleyball (1976–1984)		
Mikaela Cojuangco Jaworski	Philippines	2013			Chair of the IOC Coordination Commission for the 2032 Summer Olympics
Paul K. Tergat	Kenya	2013	athletics (1996–2004)		
Dagmawit Girmay Berhane	Ethiopia	2013			
Nenad Lalović	Serbia	2015		UWW (wrestling)	
Nita Ambani	India	2016			
Sari Essayah	Finland	2016	athletics (1992–1996)		
Luis Alberto Moreno	Colombia	2016			
Auvita Rapilla	Papua New Guinea	2016			
Anant Singh	South Africa	2016			
Tricia Smith	Canada	2016	rowing (1976–1988)		
Karl Stoss	Austria	2016			
Sarah Walker	New Zealand	2016	BMX racing (2008–2012)		Former vice-chair of the IOC Athletes' Commission. Elected to full membership in 2024.
Baklai Temengil	Palau	2017			President of Oceania National Olympic Committees
Kristin Kloster	Norway	2017			
Khunying Patama Leeswadtrakul	Thailand	2017		BWF (badminton)	
Luis Mejía Oviedo	Dominican Republic	2017			
Neven Ilic	Chile	2017			President of Panam Sports
Jean-Christophe Rolland	France	2017	rowing (1992–2000)	WR (rowing)	Member of the IOC Sustainability and Legacy Commission
Ingmar De Vos	Belgium	2017		FEI (equestrian)	
Jiří Kejval	Czech Republic	2018			
Samira Asghari	Afghanistan	2018			Member of the IOC Athletes' Entourage Commission
Daina Gudzinevičiūtė	Lithuania	2018	shooting (1996–2012)		
Camilo Pérez López Moreira	Paraguay	2018			
Felicite Rwemarika	Rwanda	2018			
William Frederick Blick	Uganda	2018			
HRH Prince Jigyel Ugyen Wangchuck	Bhutan	2018			
Andrew Parsons	Brazil	2018		IPC president (Paralympics)	
Morinari Watanabe	Japan	2018		FIG (gymnastics)	
Giovanni Malagò	Italy	2019			President of Organizing Committee of 2026 Winter Olympics
Odette Assembe Engoulou	Cameroon	2019			
Filomena Fortes	Cape Verde	2019			
Matlohang Moiloa-Ramoqopo	Lesotho	2019			
Tidjane Thiam	Ivory Coast	2019			
Laura Chinchilla	Costa Rica	2019			
Erick Thohir	Indonesia	2019			
Spyros Capralos	Greece	2019	water polo (1980–1984)		President of European Olympic Committees
Mustapha Berraf	Algeria	2019			President of the Association of National Olympic Committees of Africa
David Haggerty	United States	2020		ITF (tennis)	
Gianni Infantino	Switzerland	2020		FIFA (football)	
María de la Caridad Colón Rueñes	Cuba	2020	athletics (1980)		
Kolinda Grabar-Kitarović	Croatia	2020			
HRH Princess Reema Bandar Al-Saud	Saudi Arabia	2020			
Battushig Batbold	Mongolia	2020			
Lord Sebastian Coe	Great Britain	2020	athletics (1980–1984)	WA (athletics)	President of Organizing Committee of 2012 Summer Olympics
Pau Gasol Sáez	Spain	2021	basketball (2004–2020)		Chair of the IOC Athletes' Commission
Yuki Ota	Japan	2021	fencing (2004–2016)		Member of the IOC Athletes' Commission
Federica Pellegrini	Italy	2021	swimming (2004–2020)		Member of the IOC Athletes' Commission
Maja Martyna Włoszczowska	Poland	2021	cross-country cycling (2004–2020)		Vice-chair of the IOC Athletes' Commission
Humphrey Kayange	Kenya	2021	rugby (2016)		Vice-chair of the IOC Athletes' Commission
Yiech Pur Biel	(International Olympic Committee) Refugee Olympic Team	2022	athletics (2016)		
Danka Hrbeková	Slovakia	2022	shooting (2008–2024)		Former vice-chair of the IOC Athletes' Commission
David Lappartient	France	2022		UCI (cycling)	
Martin Fourcade	France	2022	biathlon (2010–2018)		Member of the IOC Athletes' Commission
Frida Hansdotter Jansson	Sweden	2022	alpine skiing (2010–2018)		Member of the IOC Athletes' Commission
Yael Arad	Israel	2023	judo (1992–1996)		
Balázs Fürjes	Hungary	2023			
Cecilia Tait Villacorta	Peru	2023	volleyball (1980–1988)		
Michelle Yeoh	Malaysia	2023			
Michael Mronz	Germany	2023			
Petra Sörling	Sweden	2023		ITTF (table tennis)	
Kim Jae-youl	South Korea	2023		ISU (ice skating)	
Mehrez Boussayene	Tunisia	2023			
Aya Medany	Egypt	2024	modern pentathlon (2004–2012)		
Paula Belén Pareto	Argentina	2024	judo (2008–2020)		
Damaris Young	Panama	2024			
Sir Hugh Robertson	Great Britain	2024			Member of the IOC Olympic Programme Commission
Gene Sykes	United States	2024			
Kim Bui	Germany	2024	artistic gymnastics (2012–2020)		Member of the IOC Athletes' Commission
Marcus Daniell	New Zealand	2024	tennis (2016–2020)		Member of the IOC Athletes' Commission
Allyson Felix	United States	2024	athletics (2004–2020)		Member of the IOC Athletes' Commission
Jessica Fox	Australia	2024	canoeing (2012–2024)		Member of the IOC Athletes' Commission
Ian Chesterman, AM	Australia	2025			
Tony Estanguet	France	2025	canoeing (2000–2012)		President of Organizing Committee of 2024 Summer Olympics
Soraya Aghaei Hajiagha	Iran	2026	badminton (2020)		Member of the IOC Athletes' Commission
Johanna Talihärm	Estonia	2026	biathlon (2014–2026)		Member of the IOC Athletes' Commission
Won Yun-jong	South Korea	2026	bobsleigh (2014–2022)		Member of the IOC Athletes' Commission

- Athletes' Commission members are elected for eight-year terms.

== Honorary members ==
Most honorary members are former members who, after finishing their terms of office, are made honorary members.

Member	Country	Since	Honorary since	Olympic participation	Notes
Shagdarjav Magvan	Mongolia	1977	2007		
Mustapha Larfaoui	Algeria	1995	2009		Former president of World Aquatics (1988–2009)
Manuela Di Centa	Italy	1999	2010	cross-country skiing (1984–1998)	Former member of the IOC Athletes' Commission
Kipchoge Keino	Kenya	2000	2011	athletics (1964–1972)	
Chiharu Igaya	Japan	1982	2012	alpine skiing (1952–1960)	
Prof. Arne Ljungqvist	Sweden	1994	2012	athletics (1952)	
Antun Vrdoljak	Croatia	1995	2012		
Intendant Général Lassana Palenfo	Ivory Coast	2000	2012		Former president of the Association of National Olympic Committees of Africa
Francisco J. Elizalde	Philippines	1985	2013		
HM King Willem-Alexander of the Netherlands	Netherlands	1998	2013		
Carlos Arthur Nuzman‡	Brazil	2000	2013	volleyball (1964)	President of Organizing Committee of 2016 Summer Olympics
Jean-Claude Killy	France	1995	2014	alpine skiing (1964–1968)	President of Organizing Committee of 1992 Winter Olympics
HRH Prince Nawaf Bin Faisal Bin Fahad Bin Abdulaziz Al Saud	Saudi Arabia	2002	2014		
Julio César Maglione	Uruguay	1996	2016		Former president of World Aquatics (2009–2021)
Vitaly Smirnov	Russia	1971	2016		
Toni Khoury	Lebanon	1995	2016		
Alexander Popov	Russia	2000	2016	swimming (1992–2004)	Former member of the IOC Athletes' Commission
Timothy Tsun Ting Fok	Hong Kong	2001	2017		
Gerhard Heiberg	Norway	1994	2017		President of Organizing Committee of 1994 Winter Olympics
HRH Prince Tunku Imran	Malaysia	2006	2019		
Mario Pescante	Italy	1994	2019		
Sam Ramsamy	South Africa	1995	2019		
Franco Carraro	Italy	1982	2020		
Iván Dibós	Peru	1982	2020		
Willi Kaltschmitt Luján	Guatemala	1988	2020		
Sir Austin L. Sealy, KT	Barbados	1994	2020		
Samih Moudallal	Syria	1998	2020		
Habu Gumel	Nigeria	2009	2020		Vice-president of the FIVB (volleyball)
Beatrice Allen	Gambia	2006	2021		Vice-president of the WBSC (baseball/softball)
HM King Frederik X of Denmark	Denmark	2009	2021		
Richard W. Pound, KC Ad.E.	Canada	1978	2023	swimming (1960)	
Pál Schmitt	Hungary	1983	2023	fencing (1968–1976)	
John Coates, AC	Australia	2001	2025		
Prof. Uğur Erdener	Turkey	2008	2025		Former president of World Archery
Marisol Casado	Spain	2010	2025		Former president of World Triathlon
Yu Zaiqing	China	2000	2026		
Ivo Ferriani	Italy	2016	2026	bobsleigh (1988)	Former president of the IBSF (bobsleigh & skeleton)

‡ – Membership currently suspended

== Honorary president ==
Member	Country	Since	Honorary since	Olympic participation	Notes
Thomas Bach	Germany	1991	2025	fencing (1976)	Former president of International Olympic Committee (2013–2025)

== Honour members ==
Member	Country	Honour since
Francesco Ricci Bitti	Italy	2025
Ban Ki-moon	South Korea	2025

== Original members ==
Member	Country	From	Until	Notes
Ferdinando Lucchesi-Palli	Italy	1894	1894	
Demetrios Vikelas	Greece	1894	1897	President (1894–1896)
Arthur Russell, 2nd Baron Ampthill	Great Britain	1894	1898	
Oleksiy Butovsky	Russian Empire	1894	1900	
Leonard Cuff	/ New Zealand	1894	1905	
Charles Herbert	Great Britain	1894	1906	
José Benjamín Zubiaur	Argentina	1894	1907	
Ferenc Kemény	Austria-Hungary	1894	1907	First Secretary (1895–1907)
Ernest Callot	France	1894	1913	Treasurer (1894–1895)
Viktor Balck	Sweden-Norway	1894	1921	
William Milligan Sloane	United States	1894	1924	
Baron Pierre de Coubertin	France	1894	1925	President (1896–1925)
Jiří Stanislav Guth-Jarkovský	Bohemia	1894	1943	
