= List of National Olympic Committees =

Below is a list of all National Olympic Committees, representing the 206 countries and territories which participate in the Olympics.

A total of 206 member countries and territories participate in the Olympics; that is higher than the 193 member states of the United Nations, because up until 1996 the International Olympic Committee allowed non sovereign countries or territories to become members.

There are currently 13 non-sovereign territories or partially unrecognized countries that are members of the Olympics while not being members of the United Nations: American Samoa, Aruba, Bermuda, British Virgin Islands, Cayman Islands, Chinese Taipei, Cook Islands, Guam, Hong Kong, Kosovo, Palestine, Puerto Rico, and the US Virgin Islands.

Conversely, there is currently no United Nations member state that does not participate at the Olympics.

Finally, one of the two United Nations General Assembly observer states, the Holy See (sovereign over Vatican City) is also not a member of the Olympics.

== List ==
=== Current ===
Country or territory	National Olympic Committee	Notes
Afghanistan	National Olympic Committee of the Islamic Republic of Afghanistan	
Albania	Albanian National Olympic Committee	
Algeria	Algerian Olympic Committee	
American Samoa	American Samoa National Olympic Committee	Not a member of the UN; an unincorporated territory of the USA
Andorra	Andorran Olympic Committee	
Angola	Angolan Olympic Committee	
Antigua and Barbuda	Antigua and Barbuda National Olympic Committee	
Argentina	Argentine Olympic Committee	
Armenia	Armenian Olympic Committee	
Aruba	Aruban Olympic Committee	Not a member of the UN; a constituent country of the Kingdom of the Netherlands
Australia	Australian Olympic Committee	
Austria	Austrian Olympic Committee	
Azerbaijan	National Olympic Committee of the Republic of Azerbaijan	
Bahamas	Bahamas Olympic Committee	
Bahrain	Bahrain Olympic Committee	
Bangladesh	Bangladesh Olympic Association	
Barbados	Barbados Olympic Association	
Belarus	Belarus Olympic Committee	
Belgium	Belgian Olympic and Interfederal Committee	
Belize	Belize Olympic and Commonwealth Games Association	
Benin	Benin National Olympic and Sports Committee	
Bermuda	Bermuda Olympic Association	Not a member of the UN; a British Overseas Territory
Bhutan	Bhutan Olympic Committee	
Bolivia	Bolivian Olympic Committee	
Bosnia and Herzegovina	Olympic Committee of Bosnia and Herzegovina	
Botswana	Botswana National Olympic Committee	
Brazil	Brazilian Olympic Committee	
British Virgin Islands	British Virgin Islands Olympic Committee	Not a member of the UN; a British Overseas Territory
Brunei Darussalam	Brunei Darussalam National Olympic Council	
Bulgaria	Bulgarian Olympic Committee	
Burkina Faso	Burkinabé National Olympic and Sports Committee	
Burundi	Burundi National Olympic Committee	
Cambodia	National Olympic Committee of Cambodia	
Cameroon	Cameroon Olympic and Sports Committee	
Canada	Canadian Olympic Committee	
Cape Verde	Cape Verdean Olympic Committee	
Cayman Islands	Cayman Islands Olympic Committee	Not a member of the UN; a British Overseas Territory
Central African Republic	Central African National Olympic and Sports Committee	
Chad	Chadian Olympic and Sports Committee	
Chile	Chilean Olympic Committee	
China	Chinese Olympic Committee	
Chinese Taipei	Chinese Taipei Olympic Committee	Not a member of the UN; represents the island of Taiwan, which claims to be the Republic of China, but whose territory is claimed in whole by the People's Republic of China
Colombia	Colombian Olympic Committee	
Comoros	Olympic and Sports Committee of the Comoros	
Congo	Congolese National Olympic and Sports Committee	
Congo DR	Congolese Olympic Committee	
Cook Islands	Cook Islands Sports and National Olympic Committee	Non member state of the UN, in free association with New Zealand
Costa Rica	Olympic Committee of Costa Rica	
Croatia	Croatian Olympic Committee	
Cuba	Cuban Olympic Committee	
Cyprus	Cyprus Olympic Committee	
Czech Republic	Czech Olympic Committee	
Denmark	National Olympic Committee and Sports Confederation of Denmark	
Djibouti	Djibouti National Olympic and Sports Committee	
Dominica	Dominica Olympic Committee	
Dominican Republic	Dominican Republic Olympic Committee	
Ecuador	Ecuadorian Olympic Committee	
Egypt	Egyptian Olympic Committee	
El Salvador	El Salvador Olympic Committee	
Equatorial Guinea	Olympic Committee of Equatorial Guinea	
Eritrea	Eritrean National Olympic Committee	
Estonia	Estonian Olympic Committee	
Eswatini	Eswatini Olympic and Commonwealth Games Association	
Ethiopia	Ethiopian Olympic Committee	
Federated States of Micronesia	Federated States of Micronesia Olympic Committee	
Fiji	Fiji Association of Sports and National Olympic Committee	
Finland	Finnish Olympic Committee	
France	French National Olympic and Sports Committee	
Gabon	Gabonese Olympic Committee	
Gambia	The Gambia National Olympic Committee	
Georgia	Georgian National Olympic Committee	
Germany	German Olympic Sports Confederation	
Ghana	Ghana Olympic Committee	
Greece	Hellenic Olympic Committee	
Great Britain	British Olympic Association	A member of the UN under the name United Kingdom
Grenada	Grenada Olympic Committee	
Guam	Guam National Olympic Committee	Not a member of the UN; an unincorporated territory of the USA
Guatemala	Guatemalan Olympic Committee	
Guinea	Guinean National Olympic and Sports Committee	
Guinea-Bissau	Guinea-Bissau Olympic Committee	
Guyana	Guyana Olympic Association	
Haiti	Haitian Olympic Committee	
Honduras	Honduran Olympic Committee	
Hong Kong	Sports Federation and Olympic Committee of Hong Kong, China	Not a member of the UN; a special administrative region of China
Hungary	Hungarian Olympic Committee	
Iceland	National Olympic and Sports Association of Iceland	
India	Indian Olympic Association	
Indonesia	Indonesian Olympic Committee	
Iran	National Olympic Committee of the Islamic Republic of Iran	
Iraq	National Olympic Committee of Iraq	
Ireland	Olympic Federation of Ireland	
Israel	Olympic Committee of Israel	
Italy	Italian National Olympic Committee	
Jamaica	Jamaica Olympic Association	
Ivory Coast	Comité National Olympique de Côte d'Ivoire	
Japan	Japanese Olympic Committee	
Jordan	Jordan Olympic Committee	
Kazakhstan	National Olympic Committee of the Republic of Kazakhstan	
Kenya	National Olympic Committee of Kenya	
Kiribati	Kiribati National Olympic Committee	
Kosovo	Olympic Committee of Kosovo	Not a member of the UN; whole territory claimed by Serbia
Kuwait	Kuwait Olympic Committee	
Kyrgyzstan	National Olympic Committee of the Kyrgyz Republic	
Laos	National Olympic Committee of Laos	
Latvia	Latvian Olympic Committee	
Lebanon	Lebanese Olympic Committee	
Lesotho	Lesotho National Olympic Committee	
Liberia	Liberia National Olympic Committee	
Libya	Libyan Olympic Committee	
Liechtenstein	Liechtenstein Olympic Committee	
Lithuania	Lithuanian National Olympic Committee	
Luxembourg	Luxembourg Olympic and Sporting Committee	
Madagascar	Malagasy Olympic Committee	
Malawi	Olympic and Commonwealth Games Association of Malawi	
Malaysia	Olympic Council of Malaysia	
Maldives	Maldives Olympic Committee	
Mali	National Olympic and Sports Committee of Mali	
Malta	Maltese Olympic Committee	
Marshall Islands	Marshall Islands National Olympic Committee	
Mauritania	Mauritanian National Olympic and Sports Committee	
Mauritius	Mauritius Olympic Committee	
Mexico	Mexican Olympic Committee	
Moldova	National Olympic Committee of the Republic of Moldova	
Monaco	Monégasque Olympic Committee	
Mongolia	Mongolian National Olympic Committee	
Montenegro	Montenegrin Olympic Committee	
Morocco	Moroccan National Olympic Committee	
Mozambique	National Olympic Committee of Mozambique	
Myanmar	Myanmar Olympic Committee	
Namibia	Namibia National Olympic Committee	
Nauru	Nauru Olympic Committee	
Nepal	Nepal Olympic Committee	
Netherlands	NOC*NSF	
New Zealand	New Zealand Olympic Committee	
Nicaragua	Nicaraguan Olympic Committee	
Niger	Nigerien Olympic and National Sports Committee	
Nigeria	Nigeria Olympic Committee	
North Korea	Olympic Committee of the Democratic People's Republic of Korea	
North Macedonia	Olympic Committee of North Macedonia	
Norway	Norwegian Olympic and Paralympic Committee and Confederation of Sports	
Oman	Oman Olympic Committee	
Pakistan	Pakistan Olympic Association	
Palau	Palau National Olympic Committee	
Palestine	Palestine Olympic Committee	An observer state of the United Nations General Assembly
Panama	Panama Olympic Committee	
Papua New Guinea	Papua New Guinea Olympic Committee	
Paraguay	Paraguayan Olympic Committee	
Peru	Peruvian Olympic Committee	
Philippines	Philippine Olympic Committee	
Poland	Polish Olympic Committee	
Portugal	Olympic Committee of Portugal	
Puerto Rico	Puerto Rico Olympic Committee	Not a member of the UN; an unincorporated territory of the USA
Qatar	Qatar Olympic Committee	
Romania	Romanian Olympic and Sports Committee	
Russia	Russian Olympic Committee	
Rwanda	Rwanda National Olympic and Sports Committee	
Saint Kitts and Nevis	Saint Kitts and Nevis Olympic Committee	
Saint Lucia	Saint Lucia Olympic Committee	
Saint Vincent and the Grenadines	Saint Vincent and the Grenadines Olympic Committee	
Samoa	Samoa Association of Sports and National Olympic Committee	
San Marino	Sammarinese National Olympic Committee	
Sao Tome and Principe	São Tomé and Príncipe Olympic Committee	
Saudi Arabia	Saudi Olympic and Paralympic Committee	
Senegal	Senegalese National Olympic and Sports Committee	
Serbia	Olympic Committee of Serbia	
Seychelles	Seychelles Olympic and Commonwealth Games Association	
Sierra Leone	National Olympic Committee of Sierra Leone	
Singapore	Singapore National Olympic Council	
Slovakia	Slovak Olympic and Sports Committee	
Slovenia	Olympic Committee of Slovenia	
Solomon Islands	National Olympic Committee of Solomon Islands	
Somalia	Somali Olympic Committee	
South Africa	South African Sports Confederation and Olympic Committee	
South Korea	Korean Sport & Olympic Committee	
South Sudan	South Sudan National Olympic Committee	
Spain	Spanish Olympic Committee	
Sri Lanka	National Olympic Committee of Sri Lanka	
Sudan	Sudan Olympic Committee	
Suriname	Suriname Olympic Committee	
Sweden	Swedish Olympic Committee	
Switzerland	Swiss Olympic Association	
Syria	Syrian Olympic Committee	
Tajikistan	National Olympic Committee of the Republic of Tajikistan	
Tanzania	Tanzania Olympic Committee	
Thailand	National Olympic Committee of Thailand	
Timor-Leste	National Olympic Committee of Timor Leste	
Togo	Togolese National Olympic Committee	
Tonga	Tonga Sports Association and National Olympic Committee	
Trinidad and Tobago	Trinidad and Tobago Olympic Committee	
Tunisia	Tunisian Olympic Committee	
Turkey	Turkish National Olympic Committee	
Turkmenistan	National Olympic Committee of Turkmenistan	
Tuvalu	Tuvalu Association of Sports and National Olympic Committee	
Uganda	Uganda Olympic Committee	
Ukraine	National Olympic Committee of Ukraine	
United Arab Emirates	United Arab Emirates National Olympic Committee	
United States	United States Olympic & Paralympic Committee	
Uruguay	Uruguayan Olympic Committee	
US Virgin Islands	Virgin Islands Olympic Committee	Not a member of the UN; an unincorporated territory of the USA
Uzbekistan	National Olympic Committee of the Republic of Uzbekistan	
Vanuatu	Vanuatu Association of Sports and National Olympic Committee	
Venezuela	Venezuelan Olympic Committee	
Vietnam	Vietnam Olympic Committee	
Yemen	Yemen Olympic Committee	
Zambia	National Olympic Committee of Zambia	
Zimbabwe	Zimbabwe Olympic Committee	

=== Defunct ===
Country or territory	National Olympic Committee	Notes
Czechoslovakia	Czechoslovak Olympic Committee	
East Germany	National Olympic Committee of the German Democratic Republic	
Netherlands Antilles	Netherlands Antilles Olympic Committee	Not a member of the UN; a constituent country of the Netherlands
North Borneo	North Borneo Olympic Committee	Not a member of the UN; a crown colony of the United Kingdom
Saar	National Olympic Committee of the Saarland	Not a member of the UN; a protectorate of France
Serbia and Montenegro	Olympic Committee of Serbia and Montenegro	
West Indies Federation	West Indies Olympic Association	
Soviet Union	Soviet Olympic Committee	
Yugoslavia	Yugoslav Olympic Committee	
