= European Olympic Committees =

Organization

- Category: Continental Sports Organization
- Membership: 50 National Olympic Committees
- Abbreviation: EOC
- Founded: 1968
- Regional affiliation: Europe
- Headquarters: Rome, Italy
- President: (Greece) Spyros Capralos
- Vice president: Daina Gudzinevičiūtė

Official website
- www.eurolympic.org
- Other key staff: Secretary-General; Raffaele Pagnozzi; Treasurer; Peter Mennel
- Official languages English • French

The European Olympic Committees (EOC; French: Comités olympiques européens, COE) is an international organization which represents the current 50 National Olympic Committees of Europe. Among other duties, the EOC organizes three major multi-sport events. These are the European Youth Olympic Festival, the Games of the Small States of Europe and the European Games.

It is affiliated with the International Olympic Committee and its affiliated bodies, including the Association of National Olympic Committees, and serves as the continental association of Europe.

The EOC has no connection with another multi-sport event called the European Championships, which are organised by various European discipline-specific sports associations.

== Member nations ==
In the following table, the year in which the NOC was recognised by the International Olympic Committee (IOC) is also given if it is different from the year in which the NOC was created.

Nation	Code	National Olympic Committee	President	Created/Recognized	IOC member	Ref.
Albania	ALB	Albanian National Olympic Committee	Viron Bezhani	1958/1959	Yes	
Andorra	AND	Andorran Olympic Committee	Jaume Marti Mandico	1971/1975	Yes	
Armenia	ARM	Armenian Olympic Committee	Gagik Tsarukyan	1990/1993	Yes	
Austria	AUT	Austrian Olympic Committee	Karl Stoss	1908/1912	Yes	
Azerbaijan	AZE	National Olympic Committee of the Republic of Azerbaijan	Ilham Aliyev	1992/1993	Yes	
Belarus	BLR	Belarus Olympic Committee	Victor Lukashenko	1991/1993	Yes	
Belgium	BEL	Belgian Olympic and Interfederal Committee	Pierre-Olivier Beckers-Vieujant	1906	Yes	
Bosnia and Herzegovina	BIH	Olympic Committee of Bosnia and Herzegovina	Marijan Kvesić	1992/1993	Yes	
Bulgaria	BUL	Bulgarian Olympic Committee	Stefka Kostadinova	1923/1924	Yes	
Croatia	CRO	Croatian Olympic Committee	Zlatko Mateša	1991/1993	Yes	
Cyprus	CYP	Cyprus Olympic Committee	George Chrysostomou	1974/1978	Yes	
Czechia	CZE	Czech Olympic Committee	Jiří Kejval	1899/1993	Yes	
Denmark	DEN	National Olympic Committee and Sports Confederation of Denmark	Hans Natorp	1905	Yes	
Estonia	EST	Estonian Olympic Committee	Kersti Kaljulaid	1923/1991	Yes	
Finland	FIN	Finnish Olympic Committee	Timo Ritakallio	1907	Yes	
France	FRA	French National Olympic and Sports Committee	Amélie Oudéa-Castéra	1894	Yes	
Georgia	GEO	Georgian National Olympic Committee	Leri Khabelov	1989/1993	Yes	
Germany	GER	German Olympic Sports Confederation	Thomas Weikert	1895	Yes	
Greece	GRE	Hellenic Olympic Committee	Isidoros Kouvelos	1894/1895	Yes	
Hungary	HUN	Hungarian Olympic Committee	Zsolt Gyulay	1895	Yes	
Iceland	ISL	National Olympic and Sports Association of Iceland	Larus L. Blöndal	1921/1935	Yes	
Ireland	IRL	Olympic Federation of Ireland	Lochlann Walsh	1922	Yes	
Israel	ISR	Olympic Committee of Israel	Yael Arad	1933/1952	Yes	
Italy	ITA	Italian National Olympic Committee	Luciano Buonfiglio	1908/1915	Yes	
Kosovo	KOS	Olympic Committee of Kosovo	Ismet Krasniqi	1992/2014	Yes	
Latvia	LAT	Latvian Olympic Committee	Žoržs Tikmers	1922/1991	Yes	
Liechtenstein	LIE	Liechtenstein Olympic Committee	Isabel Fehr	1935	Yes	
Lithuania	LTU	Lithuanian National Olympic Committee	Daina Gudzinevičiūtė	1924/1991	Yes	
Luxembourg	LUX	Luxembourg Olympic and Sporting Committee	André Hoffmann	1912	Yes	
Malta	MLT	Maltese Olympic Committee	Julian Pace Bonello	1928/1936	Yes	
Moldova	MDA	National Olympic Committee of the Republic of Moldova	Nicolae Juravschi	1991/1993	Yes	
Monaco	MON	Monégasque Olympic Committee	Albert II, Prince of Monaco	1907/1953	Yes	
Montenegro	MNE	Montenegrin Olympic Committee	Dušan Sinomović	2006/2007	Yes	
Netherlands	NED	Dutch Olympic Committee*Dutch Sports Federation	André Bolhuis	1912	Yes	
North Macedonia	MKD	Olympic Committee of North Macedonia	Vasil Tupurkovski	1992/1993	Yes	
Norway	NOR	Norwegian Olympic and Paralympic Committee and Confederation of Sports	Berit Kjøll	1900	Yes	
Poland	POL	Polish Olympic Committee	Andrzej Kraśnicki	1918/1919	Yes	
Portugal	POR	Olympic Committee of Portugal	José Manuel Constantino	1909	Yes	
Romania	ROU	Romanian Olympic and Sports Committee	Mihai Covaliu	1914	Yes	
Russia	RUS	Russian Olympic Committee	Mikhail Degtyarev	1911/1912 (restored 1993, suspended 2023, restored 2026)	Yes	
San Marino	SMR	Sammarinese National Olympic Committee	Gian Primo Giardi	1959	Yes	
Serbia	SRB	Olympic Committee of Serbia	Božidar Maljković	1910/1912 (restored 2006)	Yes	
Slovakia	SVK	Slovak Olympic and Sports Committee	Anton Siekel	1992/1993	Yes	
Slovenia	SLO	Olympic Committee of Slovenia	Bogdan Gabrovec	1991/1993	Yes	
Spain	ESP	Spanish Olympic Committee	Alejandro Blanco Bravo	1912	Yes	
Sweden	SWE	Swedish Olympic Committee	Hans von Uthman	1913	Yes	
Switzerland	SUI	Swiss Olympic Association	Jürg Stahl	1912	Yes	
Turkey	TUR	Turkish National Olympic Committee	Uğur Erdener	1908/1911	Yes	
Ukraine	UKR	National Olympic Committee of Ukraine	Serhiy Bubka	1990/1993	Yes	
United Kingdom	GBR	British Olympic Association	Dame Katherine Grainger	1905	Yes	

=== Former member nations ===
Nation	Code	National Olympic Committee	Created/Recognized	Disbanded
Czechoslovakia	TCH	Czechoslovak Olympic Committee	1919	1992
East Germany	GDR	National Olympic Committee of the German Democratic Republic	1951/1968	1990
Serbia and Montenegro	SCG	Olympic Committee of Serbia and Montenegro	2003	2006
Soviet Union	URS	Soviet Olympic Committee	1951	1992
Yugoslavia	YUG	Yugoslav Olympic Committee	1919/1920	2003

The National Olympic Committee of the Saarland (Saar Protectorate) was a member of the International Olympic Committee from 1950 to 1957, but never a member of the European Olympic Committees.

== Events ==
- European Games
- European Youth Olympic Festival (EYOF)
- Games of the Small States of Europe

== See also ==
- European Paralympic Committee
- Association of National Olympic Committees
- International Olympic Committee
- National Olympic Committee
- European Games
- European Youth Olympic Festival
- Games of the Small States of Europe
- European Championships (multi-sport event)
- Olympic Games
