= Christophe De Kepper =

Belgian lawyer and sports administrator

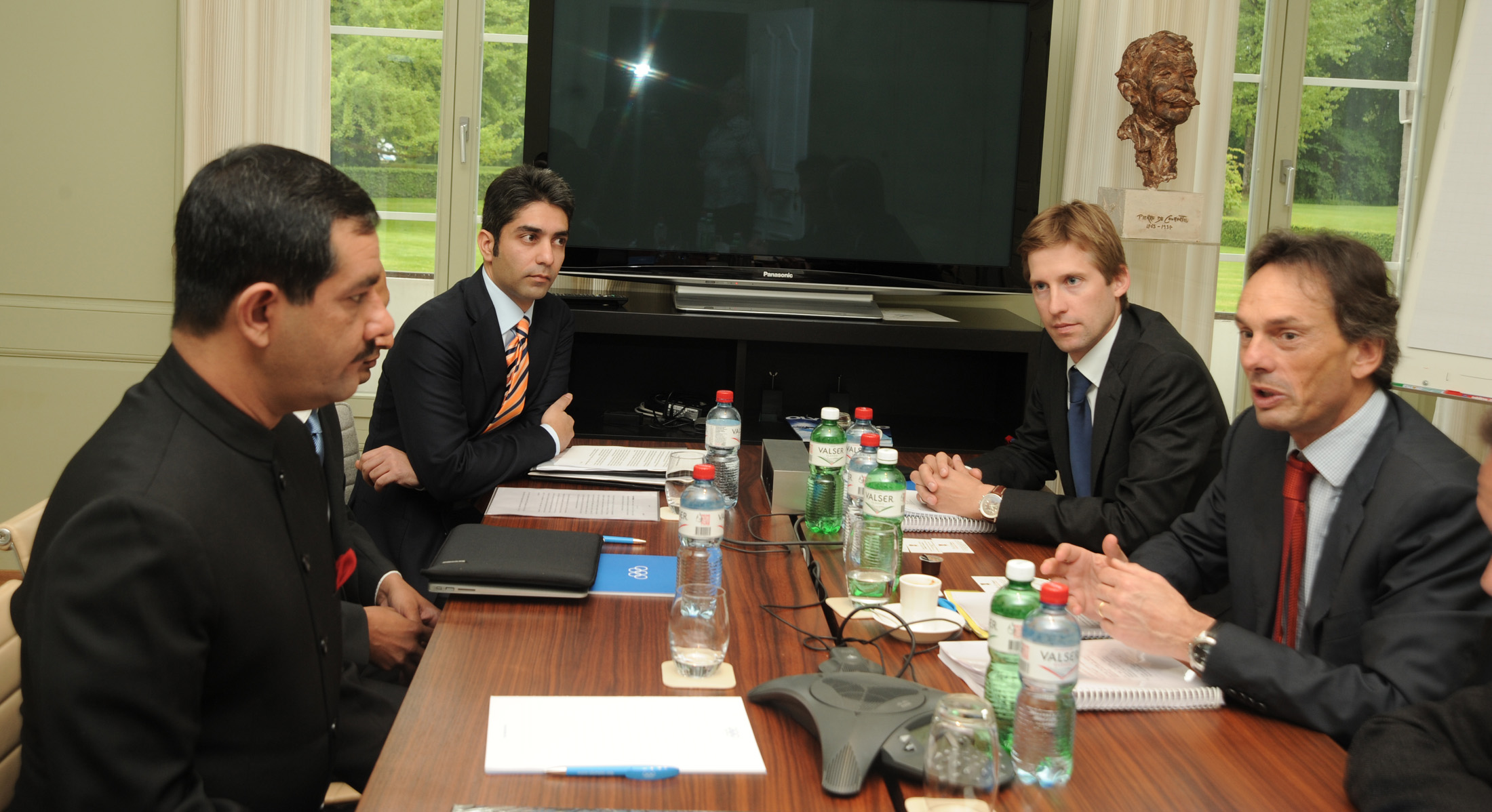
De Kepper (center right)

Christophe De Kepper is a Belgian lawyer and sports administrator, director-general and a member of the executive board of the International Olympic Committee (IOC) since April 2011, when he succeeded Urs Lacotte in the role.

== Early life and education ==
De Kepper was born in Uccle, Belgium. He obtained a law degree from the Catholic University of Louvain (UCLouvain) and completed a master's degree in European law at the Université Libre de Bruxelles (ULB). Prior to joining the IOC, De Kepper worked for the Belgian Olympic and Interfederal Committee (COIB), the European Commission, and was the Director of the European Olympic Committees (EOC) EU Office.

== Career at the International Olympic Committee ==
De Kepper officially joined the International Olympic Committee in 2001, as the Chief of Staff to then-President Jacques Rogge. Over the next decade, he became a central figure in managing the IOC's daily operations and coordinating with the National Olympic Committees (NOCs) and International Sports Federations. In April 2011, he was appointed Director General of the IOC, succeeding Urs Lacotte. In this capacity, he manages the IOC administration, oversees the execution of Executive Board decisions, and represents the organization in commercial and diplomatic negotiations. He also supervised the construction of the new IOC headquarters, Olympic House, in Lausanne, which opened in 2019.

== Administration under Thomas Bach ==
Under the presidency of Thomas Bach, De Kepper's role expanded to oversee the implementation of major strategic reforms, such as Olympic Agenda 2020. However, his tenure as Director General during this period has faced significant scrutiny from transparency advocates regarding the centralization of power within the IOC administration. During the Russian state-sponsored doping scandal, De Kepper's office was heavily criticized for its administrative response to whistleblowers like Yuliya Stepanova and Grigory Rodchenkov. Anti-doping advocates noted that the IOC administration initially focused on procedural technicalities rather than offering immediate protection or decisive action, a stance that drew severe backlash from athlete committees and transparency watchdogs.

Furthermore, investigative journalists and governance experts have criticized the structural lack of independence of the IOC's Ethics Commission under De Kepper's management. Reports indicate that the Director General's office maintains tight administrative control over which cases are escalated, effectively allowing the IOC leadership to manage the timeline and public exposure of internal corruption probes. This structural bottleneck was highlighted during the delayed administrative responses to the vote-buying scandals surrounding the 2016 Rio and 2020 Tokyo bids. In both instances, the IOC administration was accused of prioritizing institutional secrecy over transparency, only taking administrative action against corrupt officials when external law enforcement agencies forced their hand.

== Other affiliations ==
Beyond his primary duties as Director General, De Kepper holds several positions across various organizations affiliated with the Olympic movement. He is a representative of the IOC on the Foundation Board of the World Anti-Doping Agency (WADA). Additionally, he sits on the boards of OIympic Broadcasting Services (OBS), Olympic Channel Services, and the Olympic Foundation for Culture and Heritage. He is also involved in the coordination commissions for various upcoming Olympic Games.
