= Czechoslovak Olympic Committee =

- Country: Czechoslovakia
- Code: TCH
- Created: 1919
- Continental Association: EOC
- Dissolved: 1992
- Headquarters: Prague

The Czechoslovak Olympic Committee (Czech and Slovak: Československý olympijský výbor) was the non-profit organization representing athletes from Czechoslovakia in the International Olympic Committee. The ČSOV organized Czechoslovakia's representatives at the Summer and Winter Olympic Games.

It was established in Prague in 1919 and it took the place of the Czech Olympic Committee in the Association of National Olympic Committees. During the dissolution of Czechoslovakia, Czech Olympic Committee was reconstituted under its original name and it was formed Slovak Olympic and Sports Committee in 1992.

== See also ==
- Czechoslovakia at the Olympics
