= Emanuel Bosák =

Emanuel Bosák (2 September 1924 – 22 December 2011) was a Czech physical educationalist and sports official.

He was born in Jičín, and studied physical education at the Charles University in Prague. He spent his entire career, until 1990, at the Faculty of Physical Education and Sport of the same university; from 1964 to 1967 he served as associate-dean of his faculty. He served as a member of the IAAF European Commission from 1952 to 1970, of the IAAF Council 1968 until 1972, as president of the Czechoslovak Association of Physical Education and the Czechoslovak Olympic Committee from 1967 to 1970 and Minister of Sports from 1969 to 1970.

In May 2009, Bosak was presented with the Pierre de Coubertin Medal for his work for the Olympic cause.

Sporting positions
Preceded by František Vodsloň	President of the Czechoslovak Olympic Committee; 1967–1970	Succeeded by Richard Nejezchleb
