= Auvita Rapilla =

Papuan woman (born 1971)

Secretary General of the Papua New Guinea Olympic Committee
- Incumbent
- Assumed office 2011

Personal details
- Born: 21 January 1971 (age 55)

Auvita Rapilla (born 21 January 1971) is a Papuan woman who has been the Papua New Guinea Olympic Committee's secretary general since 2011. She was named onto the International Olympic Committee in 2016.

== Early life and education ==
Auvita Rapilla was born on 21 January 1971. Rapilla attended high school in Port Moresby and Sogeri National High School, Papua New Guinea. She received a Bachelor of Arts in public administration at the University of Papua New Guinea in 1994. Rapilla furthered her education with certificates in sport management from the University of Lyon and AISTS. After she completed her master's degree in sports management at the University of Lyon, Rapilla received the Alberto Madella Award for top research project.

== Career ==
Rapilla started her career at an insurance firm located in Papua New Guinea in 1987. She remained in her position until 1993 when she moved to the Papua New Guinea Olympic Committee in 1994. Rapilla originally started as an executive assistant and was promoted to multiple positions ranging from operational manager in 1998 and secretary general in 2011.

In August 2016, Rapilla was elected to the International Olympic Committee. Her appointment made her the first woman of the Pacific to be elected onto the IOC. Other Olympic committees that Rapilla has been a part of include the Oceania National Olympic Committees and the Association of National Olympic Committees.

== Awards and honours ==
In 2009, Rapilla won a Woman and Sport award by the IOC. Rapilla was named a Member of Logohu in 2015, and was awarded the book My Walk to Equality by her PNGOC colleague Alurigo Ravusiro in 2017.
