= Slovak Olympic and Sports Committee =

National Olympic Committee for Slovakia

- Country: Slovakia
- [[|]]
- Code: SVK
- Created: 1992
- Recognized: 1993
- Continental Association: EOC
- Headquarters: Bratislava, Slovakia
- President: Anton Siekel
- Secretary General: Jozef Liba
- Website: olympic.sk

Slovak Olympic Team logo

The Slovak Olympic and Sports Committee (Slovak: Slovenský olympijský a športový výbor, SOŠV; IOC Code: SVK) is the National Olympic Committee representing Slovakia in the International Olympic Committee. It is based in Bratislava, Slovakia.

== History ==
Old logo

The Czechoslovak Olympic Committee is one of the oldest NOCs in the world, having been founded in 1899 as Bohemian Committee for the Olympic Games (Czech: Český výbor pro hry olympijské). It was transformed into the Czechoslovak Olympic Committee in 1919 and then both the Czech Olympic Committee and the Slovak Olympic Committee (Slovak: Slovenský olympijský výbor, SOV) was founded and reconstituted on 19 December 1992, and both NOCs were recognized on 20 January 1993. It is one of two successors of the Czechoslovak Olympic Committee (ČSOV) which dissolved on 27 March 1993. SOC was approved as the National Olympic Committee of Slovak Republic in Monte Carlo on 24 September 1993. In December 2018 it changed its name to the Slovak Olympic and Sports Committee.

== List of presidents ==
Name	Term
Vladimír Černušák	1992–1999
František Chmelár	1999–2016
Anton Siekel	2016–present

== Executive committee ==
- President: Anton Siekel
- Vice Presidents: Peter Korčok, Zdenko Kríž, Jozef Gönci
- Members: Monika Šišková, Jozef Jurášek, Matej Tóth, Daniel Líška, Robert Petriska, Marián Vanderka, Ľubor Halanda, Danka Barteková

== Member federations ==
The Slovak National Federations are the organizations that coordinate all aspects of their individual sports. They are responsible for training, competition and development of their sports. There are currently 30 Olympic Summer and 6 Winter Sport Federations in Slovakia.

National Federation	Summer or Winter	Headquarters
Slovak Archery Association	Summer	Bratislava
Slovak Athletic Federation	Summer	Bratislava
Slovak Badminton Federation	Summer	Prešov
Slovak Basketball Association	Summer	Bratislava
Slovak Biathlon Association	Winter	Banská Bystrica
Slovak Bobsleigh Federation	Winter	Bratislava
Slovak Boxing Federation	Summer	Bratislava
Slovak Canoe Association	Summer	Bratislava
Slovak Curling Association	Winter	Bratislava
Slovak Cycling Federation	Summer	Bratislava
Slovak Equestrian Federation	Summer	Bratislava
Slovak Fencing Federation	Summer	Bratislava
Slovak Football Association	Summer	Bratislava
Slovak Golf Association	Summer	Bratislava
Slovak Gymnastics Federation	Summer	Bratislava
Slovak Handball Federation	Summer	Bratislava
Slovak Hockey Federation	Summer	Bratislava
Slovak Ice Hockey Federation	Winter	Bratislava
Slovak Judo Federation	Summer	Bratislava
Slovak Karate Federation	Summer	Bratislava
Slovak Luge Association	Winter	Starý Smokovec
Slovak Modern Pentathlon Association	Summer	Bratislava
Slovak Mountaineering Association	Summer	Bratislava
Slovak Rowing Federation	Summer	Bratislava
Slovak Rugby Union	Summer	Bratislava
Slovak Sailing Union	Summer	Bratislava
Slovak Shooting Federation	Summer	Bratislava
Slovak Ski Association	Winter	Poprad
Slovak Swimming Federation	Summer	Bratislava
Slovak Table Tennis Association	Summer	Bratislava
Slovakia Taekwondo Association	Summer	Bratislava
Slovak Tennis Association	Summer	Bratislava
Slovak Triathlon Union	Summer	Bratislava
Slovak Volleyball Federation	Summer	Bratislava
Slovak Weightlifting Federation	Summer	Bratislava
Slovak Wrestling Federation	Summer	Bratislava

== See also ==
- Slovakia at the Olympics
