= Czech Olympic Committee =

National Olympic Committee

- Country: Czech Republic
- Code: CZE
- Created: 1899
- Recognized: 1993
- Continental Association: EOC
- Headquarters: Prague, Czech Republic
- President: Jiří Kejval
- Secretary General: Petr Graclík
- Website: www.olympijskytym.cz

Czech Team logo

The Czech Olympic Committee (Czech: Český olympijský výbor; IOC Code: CZE) is the National Olympic Committee (NOC) representing the Czech Republic.

== History ==
The Czech Olympic Committee is one of the oldest NOCs in the world, having been founded in 1899 as Bohemian Committee for the Olympic Games (Czech: Český výbor pro hry olympijské). It was transformed into the Czechoslovak Olympic Committee in 1919 and reconstituted under its original name in 1992, being formally recognized by the IOC again in 1993 as one of two successors of the Czechoslovak Olympic Committee (ČSOV) which dissolved on 27 March 1993, the other was the Slovak Olympic and Sports Committee.

== Presidents ==
The Czech Olympic Committee has had the following presidents:

President	Term
Jiří Stanislav Guth-Jarkovský	1899–1929
Josef Gruss	1929–1951
Vilém Mucha	1951–1956
Václav Pleskot	1956–1958
František Vodsloň	1958–1967
Emanuel Bosák	1967–1970
Richard Nejezchleb	1970–1972
Antonín Himl	1972–1988
Jindřich Poledník	1988–1989
Věra Čáslavská	1990–1996
Milan Jirásek	1996–2012
Jiří Kejval	2012–present

== Executive committee ==
- President: Jiří Kejval
- Vice Presidents: Roman Kumpost, Zdenek Hanik, Filip Suman, Libor Varhanik
- Secretary General: Petr Graclik

== Member federations ==
The Czech National Federations are the organizations that coordinate all aspects of their individual sports. They are responsible for training, competition and development of their sports. There are currently 34 Olympic Summer and 8 Winter Sport Federations in Czech Republic.

National Federation	Summer or Winter	Headquarters
Czech Archery Association	Summer	Prague
Czech Athletics Federation	Summer	Strahov, Prague
Czech Badminton Federation	Summer	Prague
Czech Baseball Association	Summer	Prague
Czech Basketball Federation	Summer	Prague
Czech Biathlon Union	Winter	Prague
Czech Bobsleigh and Skeleton Federation	Winter	Prague
Czech Boxing Association	Summer	Prague
Czech Canoe Union	Summer	Strahov, Prague
Czech Curling Association	Winter	Břevnov, Prague
Czech Cycling Federation	Summer	Prague
Czech Equestrian Federation	Summer	Prague
Czech Fencing Federation	Summer	Prague
Czech Figure Skating Association	Winter	Prague
Czech Hockey Federation	Summer	Prague
Czech Football Association	Summer	Prague
Czech Golf Federation	Summer	Prague
Czech Gymnastics Federation	Summer	Břevnov, Prague
Czech Handball Association	Summer	Prague
Czech Ice Hockey Association	Winter	Prague
Czech Judo Federation	Summer	Prague
Czech Karate Federation	Summer	Strahov, Prague
Czech Luge Federation	Winter	Strahov, Prague
Czech Modern Pentathlon Association	Summer	Prague
Czech Mountaineering Federation	Summer	Prague
Czech Union of Roller Skating	Summer	Prague
Czech Rowing Association	Summer	Prague
Czech Rugby Union	Summer	Prague
Czech Sailing Association	Summer	Břevnov, Prague
Czech Shooting Federation	Summer	Prague
Czech Ski Federation	Winter	Prague
Czech Speed Skating Federation	Winter	Prague
Czech Federation of Stand Up Paddle	Summer	Prague
Czech Swimming Federation	Summer	Prague
Czech Table Tennis Association	Summer	Prague
Czech Taekwondo Federation	Summer	Prague
Czech Tennis Association	Summer	Prague
Czech Triathlon Federation	Summer	Strahov, Prague
Czech Volleyball Federation	Summer	Strahov, Prague
Czech Weightlifting Federation	Summer	Prague
Czech Wrestling Federation	Summer	Prague

== See also ==
- Bohemia at the Olympics
- Czech Republic at the Olympics
