= Czech Golf Federation =

National sporting organisation in the Czech Republic

- Sport: Golf
- Jurisdiction: Czech Republic
- Abbreviation: ČGF
- Founded: 1990
- Affiliation: International Golf Federation (IGF)
- Regional affiliation: European Golf Association (EGA)
- Headquarters: Prague, Czech Republic
- President: Vratislav Janda

Official website
- www.cgf.cz

The Czech Golf Federation (Czech: Česká golfová federace) is the National Sporting Organisation for the Sport of Golf in the Czech Republic and is affiliated with both the IGF (International Golf Federation) which oversees the international governance and development of golf and the European Golf Association (EGA) which oversees the sport development at a regional level.

Czech Golf Federation is member of the Czech Olympic Committee.

== History ==
Golf Federation was founded in 1990 as Bohemian–Moravian Golf Union. In 1993 it succeeded Czechoslovak Golf Federation.
