= Jiří Stanislav Guth-Jarkovský =

Czech sports administrator and writer (1861–1943)

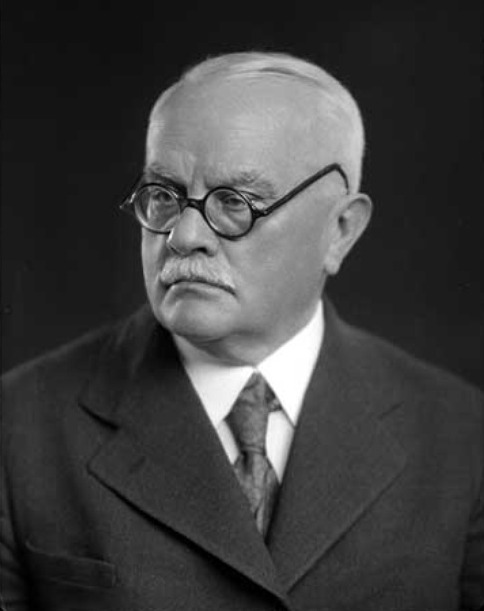
- Guth-Jarkovský in 1937
- Born: Jiří Karel Guth; 24 January 1861; Heřmanův Městec, Bohemia, Austrian Empire
- Died: 8 January 1943 (aged 81); Náchod, Protectorate of Bohemia and Moravia
- Resting place: Olšany Cemetery, Prague
- Education: Charles University
- Occupations: Writer, pedagogue
- Known for: Co-author of the Olympic Charter, president of the Czech Olympic Committee

Jiří Stanislav Guth-Jarkovský (24 January 1861 – 8 January 1943) was a Czech sports administrator, writer and pedagogue. He is known as the co-author of the Olympic Charter and the first president of the Czech Olympic Committee. During the presidency of Tomáš Masaryk, he was Master of Ceremonies of the President of the Czechoslovak Republic. He is one of the most important figures in Czech sports, culture and administration.

== Life ==
Jiří Stanislav Guth-Jarkovský (baptised Jiří Karel Guth) was born on 24 January 1861 in Heřmanův Městec. He was sickly as a child. He could not swim for a long time and never became an active athlete.

From 1870 to 1878, he attended the gymnasium in Rychnov nad Kněžnou. He thed studied philosophy, mathematics and physics at Charles University in Prague, and graduated in 1883. Between 1883 and 1887, he was employed as a tutor to the sons of the Schaumburg-Lippe noble family, which owned the Náchod estate. He lived with the family in Náchod, Ratibořice and Lancy (Switzerland) and travelled the world with them. From 1888 to 1919, he worked as a teacher at gymnasiums in Prague and Klatovy and taught Czech, French and physical education. In 1897, he married Anna Černá, with whom he had a son, Gaston.

In 1919, he changed his name to Jiří Stanislav Guth-Jarkovský. At the end of his life, he moved to Náchod, where he died of a stroke on 8 January 1943. He is buried in the family tomb at Olšany Cemetery in Prague.

== Sports administration ==
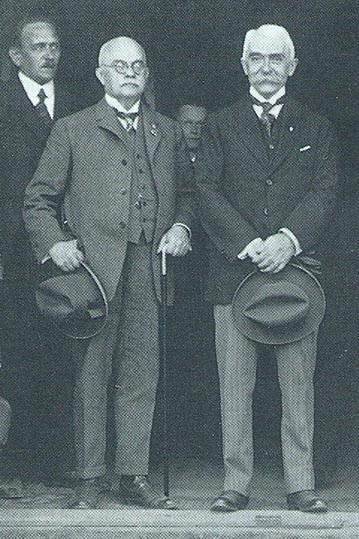
Guth-Jarkovský with Pierre de Coubertin in 1925

Guth-Jarkovský was a prominent official in the field of Czech sports, especially tourism. He was a friend with Pierre de Coubertin, who is known as the father of the modern Olympic Games. He attended the first Olympic Congress, held in 1984, and was elected a member of the International Olympic Committee. He attended the first modern Olympic Games, the 1896 Summer Olympics, as the only Czech. After returning from the Olympics, he became the initiator of the establishment of the Czech Olympic Committee (Note: Originally known as Bohemian Committee for the Olympic Games, later known as Czechoslovak Olympic Committee.), which was founded in 1899. He was its first president and held the position until 1929. Thanks to his friendship with de Coubertin, Bohemia participated in the Olympics from 1900, even though it was part of Austria-Hungary and not a sovereign country.

Guth-Jarkovský he served as Secretary General of the International Olympic Committee from 1919 to 1923 and is a co-author of the Olympic Charter.

In 1908, Guth-Jarkovský became a co-founder of the Czech Sports Council, which coordinated Czech sports organisations within the Austria-Hungary. From 1915 to 1926, he was the president of the Czech Tourist Club (Note: From 1918 known as Czechoslovak Tourist Club.).

== Master of Ceremonies ==
Guth-Jarkovský had a refined demeanor and a perfect knowledge of etiquette. Thanks to this, he obtained the position of Master of Ceremonies of the President of the Czechoslovak Republic Tomáš Masaryk in 1919. He introduced new standards of office and proposed the creation of the Order of the White Lion, an award for merit by Czechoslovakia for foreign citizens, which is today the highest order of the Czech Republic. He also introduced the office of Czechoslovak and later Czech presidents in Lány Castle.

== Writing ==
Guth-Jarkovský wrote short stories, novels and poems. He was a member of the Májovci group of authors. His most notable works include books on etiquette, books about sports, and translations of literary works from French and German. He also wrote memoirs. His best known work is Společenský katechismus ('social catechism'), written in 1914.

Although he did not like tourism, he wrote several books about it. He contributed to the development of Czech tourism as an editor of the magazine Turista.

== Honours and legacy ==
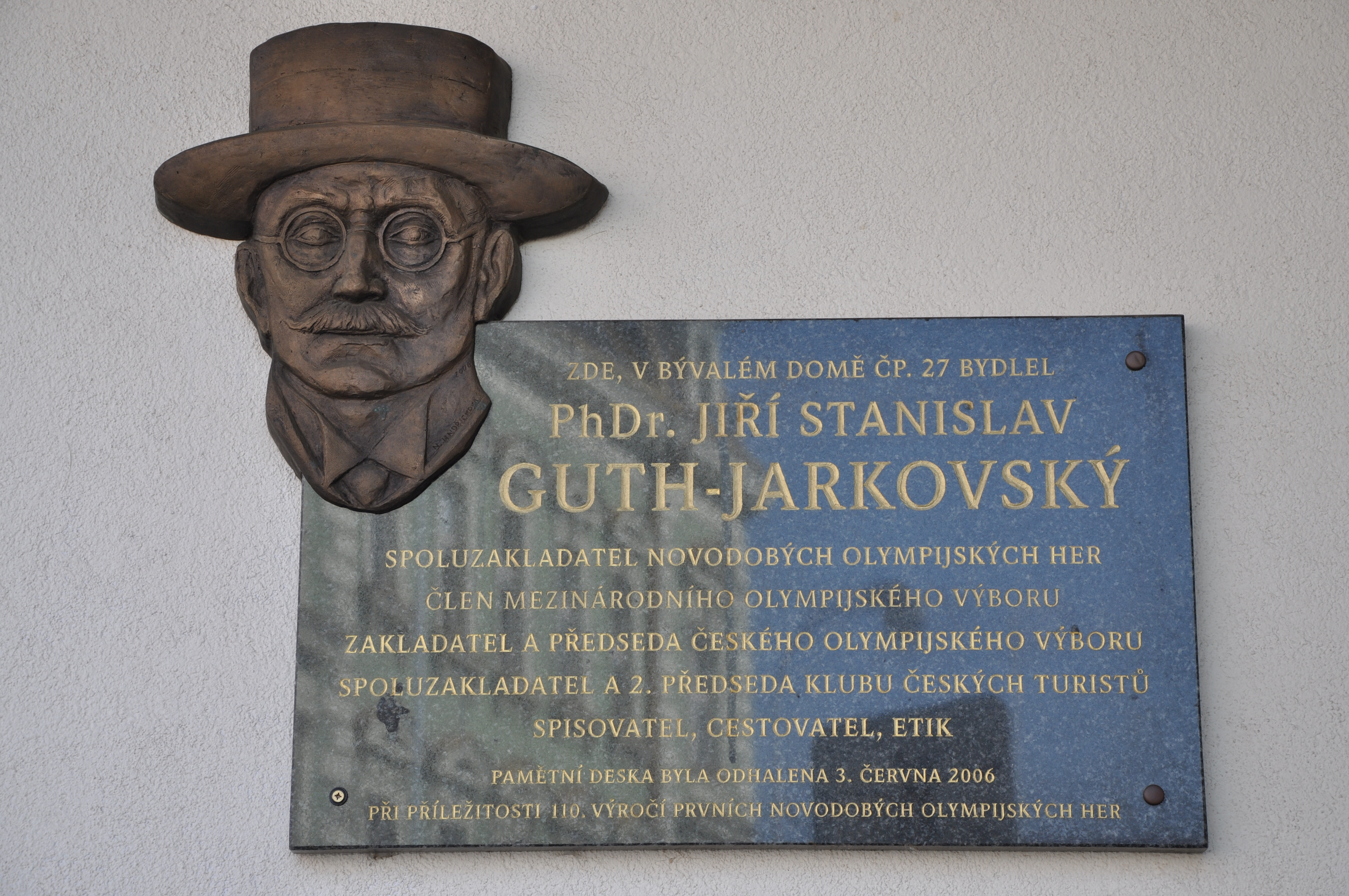
Memorial plaque in a house in Kostelec nad Orlicí, where Guth-Jarkovský also lived

Guth-Jarkovský's popularisation of the sport and etiquette brought him international recognition and many honours, including: Order of the Crown of Italy (Italy), Legion of Honour (France), Order of Orange-Nassau (Netherlands), Order of the Crown of Romania (Romania), and Order of Polonia Restituta (Poland).

Guth left behind a significant collection of literature, numbering over 3,360 volumes, which he bequeathed to the National Museum during his lifetime.

Jiří Guth-Jarkovský Award (Czech: Cena Jiřího Gutha-Jarkovského) is a sports award given by the Czech Olympic Committee for the most valuable sports performance of the year. It was introduced in 1933 and first awarded in 1934, making it the oldest Czechoslovak and Czech sports award.

A gymnasium in Prague 1 bears his name.
