= Spyros Capralos =

Greek water polo player and sports executive

Spyros Capralos OLY
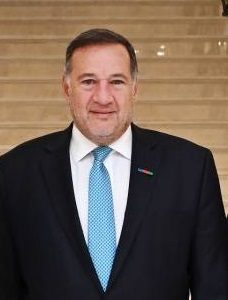

Personal information
- Born: April 15, 1955 (age 71) Athens, Greece

Sport
- Sport: Water polo

Spyros Capralos (Σπύρος Καπράλος, born 15 April 1955 in Athens) is a Greek former water polo player and sports executive. He represented Greece at the 1980 and 1984 Summer Olympics. He has been the president of the Hellenic Olympic Committee from 2009 until 2025 and the president of the European Olympic Committees since 2021. He has also been a member of the International Olympic Committee since 2019.

== Career ==
Champion of Greece in swimming from 1969 to 1975, Capralos studied economics at the University of Athens, and graduated from INSEAD with an MBA in 1979. He competed in the 1980 Summer Olympics and in the 1984 Summer Olympics. Captain of the Greek Olympic Team at the 1996 Summer Olympics in Atlanta, he was the Executive Director and Deputy Chief Operating Officer of the Organising Committee of the 2004 Summer Olympics in Athens.

He was elected president of the Hellenic Olympic Committee in 2009, and re-elected in 2013 to a second 4-year term. He is a Member of the Executive Committee of the European Olympic Committees and he is also the chair of the Coordination Commission of the second edition of the European Games, to be organised by the European Olympic Committees in Minsk in 2019. In the same year he became a member of the International Olympic Committee (IOC).

On 10 June 2021, he was elected President of the European Olympic Committees by a 34–16 vote.

On 16 January 2023, Capralos attended the funeral of Constantine II of Greece, a former Olympic champion, in his capacity as president of the Hellenic Olympic Committee.

Aside from sports, Capralos is also the chairman of Euroclinic, a private hospital in Athens, and the president and CEO of Star Bulk Carriers Corp., a Nasdaq-listed shipping company. Previously, he was also Chairman of the Athens Exchange S.A.

== Honours ==
- Order of the Rising Sun, 3rd Class, Gold Rays with Neck Ribbon (2022)
- Officer's Cross of the Order of Merit of the Republic of Poland (2024)
