= Pierre-Olivier Beckers-Vieujant =

Belgian businessman

Pierre-Olivier, Baron Beckers-Vieujant (Uccle, 3 May 1960) is a Belgian businessman and former CEO of Delhaize.

== Biography ==
Born Pierre-Olivier Beckers, he is the youngest of the six children of Guy Beckers, a former president and CEO of Delhaize. The Beckers family is one of the significant shareholders of the company. Guy Beckers (1924–2020) was the husband of Denise Vieujant (born 1929), granddaughter of Jules Vieujant, one of the founders, together with his brothers-in-law Delhaize. In 1996 Guy Beckers was granted Belgian nobility, with the honorary title of chevalier. Pierre-Olivier Beckers has been made a baron in July 2012. In November 2012 he has obtained, for himself and his descendants, a name change into Beckers-Vieujant.

Beckers obtained a BA in applied economics at the Universite Catholique de Louvain (Louvain School of Management), Louvain-La-Neuve and an MBA at Harvard Business School (United States).

In 1983 he married Karine Josz (born 1961) and they have three sons. He entered Delhaize in 1983 and after having climbed all echelons, he was elected CEO of Delhaize Group in 1999. Since September 2002 he was also chief executive officer of Delhaize America.

In 2000 he was elected Belgian 'Manager of the Year' and in 2009 "CEO BEL 20 of the Year". In the US he appeared in eighth place within the ranking of supermarket CEOs (2010, 2011, 2012). He was preceded by six Americans and by Dick Boer of Ahold.

At the end of 2013 he resigned as CEO of the Delhaize Group, remaining member of the Board of Directors until 2015. Delhaize later merged with Ahold.

He sits on the board of directors of the Consumer Goods Forum.

== Olympics ==
In addition to his business activities, Beckers was elected to a four-year term as chairman of the Belgian Olympic Committee (BOIC) in December 2004. He was re-elected for a term ending in 2013.

On 25 July 2012, he was elected at the 124th IOC Session in London as member of the International Olympic Committee. After president Rogge retired in 2013, Beckers remained the only Belgian member within the International Olympic Committee.
