= AISTS =

Swiss nonprofit foundation

International Academy of Sport Science and Technology
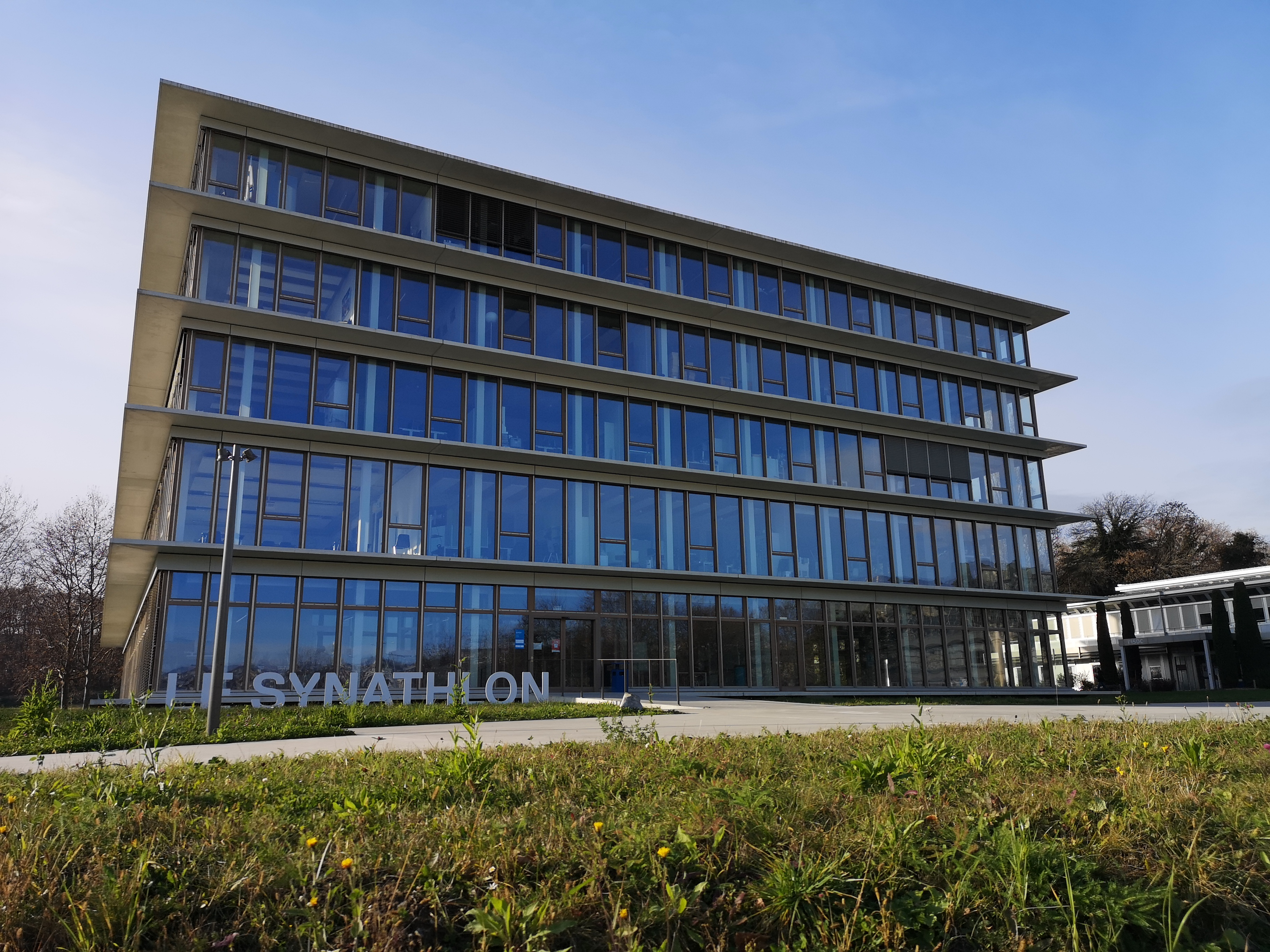
- Headquarters in Lausanne.
- Formation: 2000
- Type: Sports education and research
- Headquarters: Lausanne, Switzerland
- Members: 87 International Sports Federations
- Official language: English, French
- Director: Claude Stricker
- Website: aists.org

The International Academy of Sport Science and Technology (French: Académie internationale des sciences et techniques du sport, AISTS) is a non-profit foundation based in Lausanne, Switzerland.

== About AISTS ==
The International Academy of Sports Science and Technology is focused on sport management worldwide by offering education through graduate programs, continuing professional executive courses and seminars, and applied research and consulting in sports.

The academy's activities are built upon three pillars:

- Postgraduate education
- Continuing education
- Research

One of the academy's principal services is its Master of Advanced Studies in Sport Administration and Technology (MAS): a 15-month postgraduate master's programme training sport executives.

The academy also organises continuing educational and professional seminars in the field of sports management. Finally, AISTS offers Risk Management Conferences on various topics, including Security Risks at Sport Events and Sport Concussion for International Sport Governing Bodies.

In 2021, AISTS launched 2 new programs in India, aiming to increase sport awareness and prepare Indian students to work in the local and international sport industry.

AISTS is formed as a foundation (Art 80ss, Swiss law), by a network of the following founding members:

- International Olympic Committee
- International Institute for Management Development(IMD)
- Swiss Federal Institute of Technology in Lausanne (EPFL)
- University of Lausanne
- University of Geneva
- Ecole hôtelière de Lausanne(EHL)
- Canton of Vaud

== History ==
AISTS was founded in 2000 by the International Olympic Committee (IOC), the Swiss Federal Institute of Technology in Lausanne (EPFL), the International Institute for Management Development, the University of Lausanne, the University of Geneva, the Swiss Graduate School of Public Administration (IDHEAP), the École hôtelière de Lausanne (EHL), the City of Lausanne, and the Canton of Vaud.

== Sports management programmes ==
AISTS has the support of the International Olympic Committee for sports management worldwide, and has strong links to the worldwide Olympic Movement.

=== Sports management educational programmes ===
AISTS provides the following sports management educational programs:

* Master of Advanced Studies in Sport Administration and Technology (MAS) The AISTS MAS (Master of Advanced Studies) in Sports Administration and Technology is a graduate program in sports management. It incorporates training in Sports Management & Economics, Technology, Law, Sociology, and Sport Medicine. Its multidisciplinary master's degree is co-signed by the Swiss Federal Institute of Technology in Lausanne, the University of Geneva and the University of Lausanne. Every year, it attracts graduate students and professionals from all continents (85% of the students are not Swiss).

=== Sports management applied research ===
AISTS delivers knowledge from human sciences, life sciences and engineering sciences. AISTS acts as an advisor and manager to sporting and non-sporting organisations such as the International Olympic Committee, international sports federations (Ski, Volleyball, Basketball, etc.), and national sports federations.

== See also ==
- International Olympic Committee (IOC)
- Sports management
- Sports medicine
- European Athletic Association
- International Tennis Federation (ITF)
- World Taekwondo Federation
- International Basketball Federation (FIBA)
- Athletissima
- Canton of Vaud
