= Jiří Kejval =

Czech sports official and rower

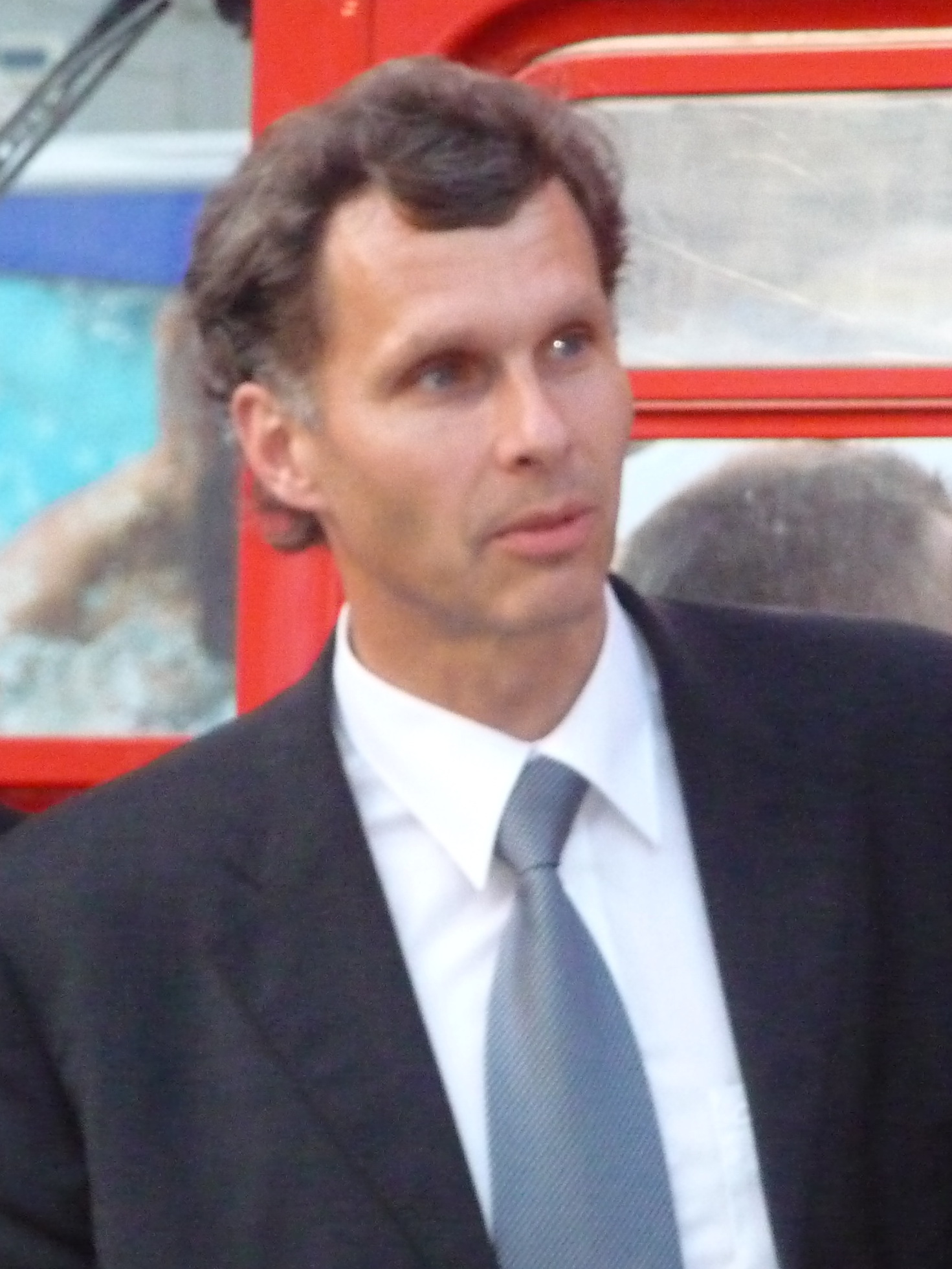
- Born: 30 November 1967 (age 58); Prague, Czechoslovakia
- Occupations: – IOC member – IOC Marketing Commission – Chair – IOC Television and Marketing Services – Chair of board of directors – ANOC Medical Commission Member – WADA Executive Board and Foundation board member

Jiří Kejval (born 30 November 1967 in Prague) is a Czech sports official, businessman and since 2012 President of the Czech Olympic Committee (Czech NOC). During his active sports career he competed at international level and for eighteen years was President of the Czech Rowing Association.

He graduated from the Faculty of Civil Engineering of the Czech Technical University in Prague and is married with three children.

== Sports career ==
Jiří Kejval is a multiple national champion in rowing and for many years he also competed internationally for Czechoslovakia and then the Czech Republic. In the years 1992 and 1993 he won the Rössler-Ořovský Spring Sculls race, which is part of the Prague Primátorky regatta. In 1991 he finished 10th in the World Championships. In 1992 he was selected to compete at the Olympic Games in Barcelona, but because his partner in the two-man crew fell ill he did not compete in the end. He retired from competitive rowing in 1994. He continues to row regularly and a new challenge for him in recent years has been participation in cross country skiing races.

== Public office ==
In the years 1996–2014 Jiří Kejval held the position of President of the Czech Rowing Association. In 2009 he became vice-chairperson of the executive committee for Economics and Marketing at the Czech Olympic Committee. In 2012 he succeeded Milan Jirásek as President of the Czech Olympic Committee. He began his third four-year term in 2021, eventually winning the election unopposed, and his term will run until the autumn of 2024.

He devised the Olympic Festival (originally Olympic Park) concept, which since 2014 during the Olympic Games has promoted sport and brought sport closer to the general public, and children in particular. The project has been adopted by the International Olympic Committee (IOC) and is being expanded to other countries.

In February 2018 at the IOC Session held during the Winter Olympics in Pyeongchang, South Korea, Kejval was elected a member of the International Olympic Committee for an eight-year term.

He is also Chairman of the IOC Marketing Commission and chairman of the board of IOC Television and Marketing Services, and a member of the Medical Commission of the Association of National Olympic Committees. In 2017 he was appointed a member of the Executive Committee of WADA. All Kejval's roles in sport administration are non-paid. He has also applied the same voluntary principle to all elected members of the Czech NOC leadership.

== Business activities ==
Jiří Kejval sees his activity in sport as a part of social responsibility. He is able to do this thanks to his successful business career, which he commenced in 1991. In that year he established, together with business partner Martin Kulík, the company TECHO a.s., which from a small producer of interior lighting grew into, over a period of five years, a leader in the area of office furnishings in the Czech Republic.

At the current time around 30 per cent of all offices in the Czech Republic have furnishings from Techo. In addition the company is also a leading creator of commercial interiors in Europe and beyond. It has even supplied furniture, for example, to Buckingham Palace.

His stake in the company, worth hundreds of millions of crowns, was sold in 2008 to the group Royal Ahrend, the number three office furniture producer in Europe. Even after selling the company Kejval has continued as managing director and in 2012 he was appointed one of the three board members of Royal Ahrend.

== Relationship to art and education ==
In 1998 Jiří Kejval co-founded the non-profit organisation Prostor – architektura, interiér, design, which aims to promote Czech architecture, interior design and design. He also supports the DOX Centre for Contemporary Art. At the Czech NOC he has championed a connection between sport and culture in the spirit of Olympic values and ideals. He was also active in the American Fund for Czech and Slovak Leadership Studies, which supports talented Czech and Slovak students.

In 2012 he initiated establishment of the Czech Olympic Foundation. This helps children from disadvantaged family backgrounds to take up sport. He has strived long-term to improve the situation in the area of corporate social responsibility and sport.
