= Karl Stoss =

Austrian sports executive

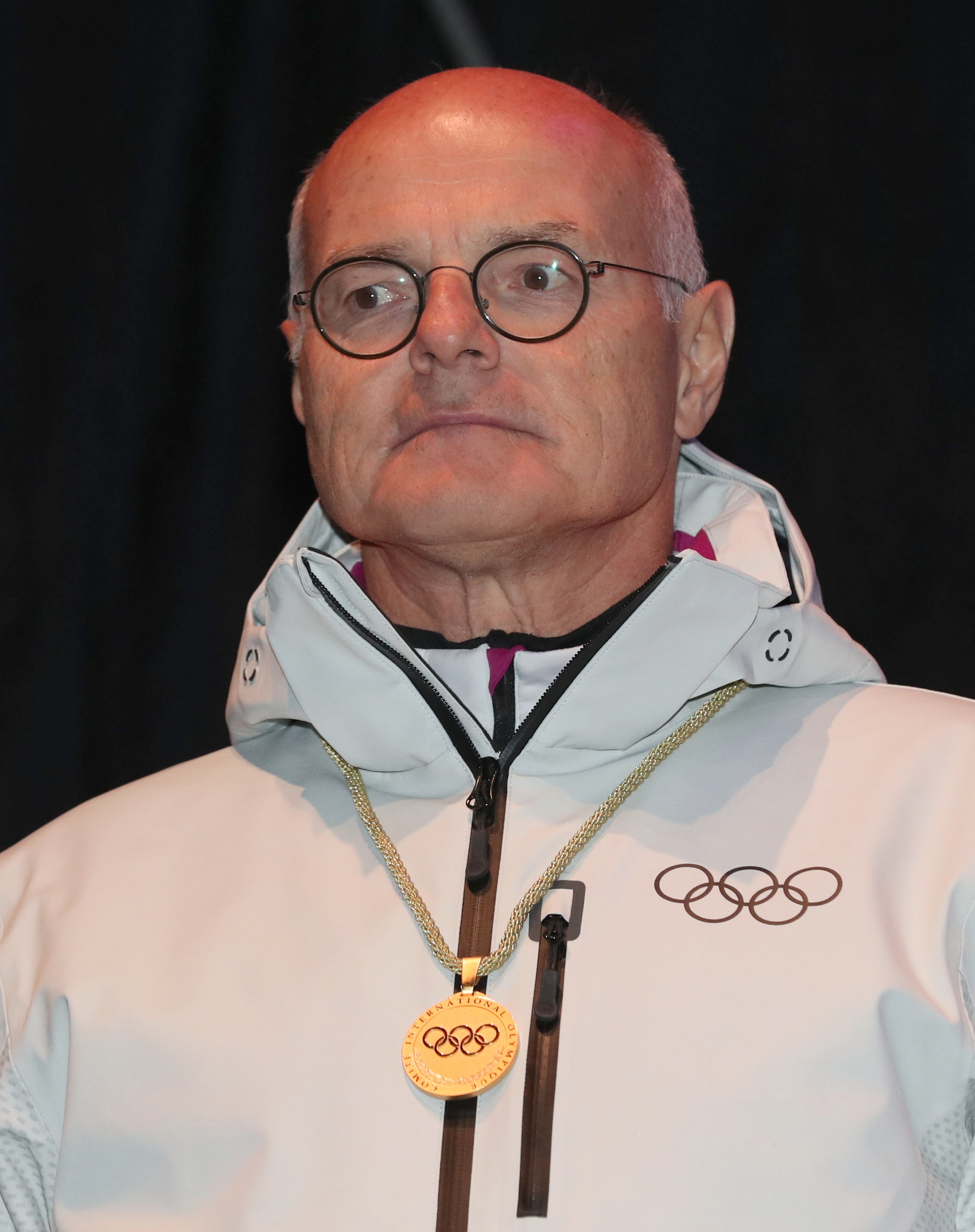
- Stoss in 2020
- Born: 26 November 1956 (age 69); Dornbirn, Austria
- Occupation: sports executive

Karl Stoss (26 November 1956) is an Austrian sports executive. Stoss was the managing director of Casinos Austria from 2007 to 2017. From 2009 till 2025 he was the president of the Austrian Olympic Committee. He is a member of the International Olympic Committee since 2016 and is appointed as chair of the future host Commission for the Winter Olympics.
