= International Olympic Committee =

Governing body of Olympic sports

Coordinates: 46°31′5″N 6°35′49″E

- Comité international olympique (French)

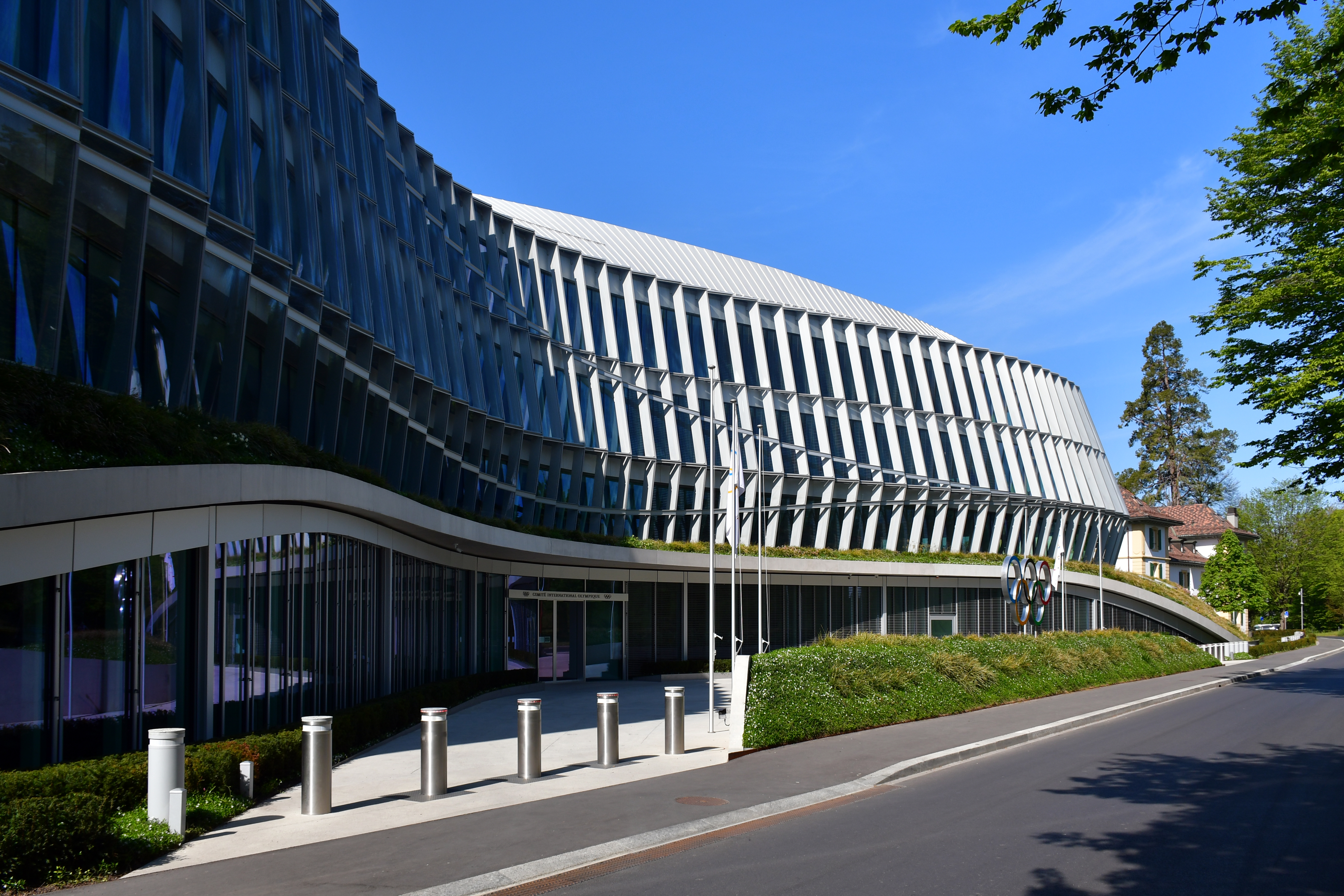
- IOC headquarters in Lausanne, Switzerland
- Abbreviation: IOC (English), CIO (French)
- Formation: 23 June 1894; 132 years ago
- Founders: Pierre de Coubertin; Demetrios Vikelas
- Type: Sports federation (association organised under the laws of the Swiss Confederation)
- Headquarters: Olympic House, Lausanne, Switzerland
- Members: 206 National Olympic Committees
- Official language: French (reference language), English, and the host country's language when necessary
- Honorary President: Thomas Bach
- President: Kirsty Coventry
- Vice Presidents: Nawal El Moutawakel; Gerardo Werthein; Pierre-Olivier Beckers-Vieujant; Juan Antonio Samaranch
- Director General: Christophe De Kepper
- Website: www.olympics.com/ioc
- Anthem: Olympic Anthem; Motto: Citius, Altius, Fortius – Communiter (Latin: Faster, Higher, Stronger – Together)

The International Olympic Committee (IOC) (Note: French: Comité international olympique (CIO)) is the international, non-governmental, sports governing body of the modern Olympic Games. Founded in 1894 by Pierre de Coubertin and Demetrios Vikelas, it is based in Lausanne, Switzerland. The IOC is the authority responsible for organising the Summer, Winter, and Youth Olympics. The IOC is also the governing body of the National Olympic Committees (NOCs) and the worldwide Olympic Movement, which includes all entities and individuals involved in the Olympic Games. Since 2025, the IOC president has been Kirsty Coventry.

As of 2026, a total of 206 countries and territories are officially recognised by the IOC and participate in the Olympics.

== Mission ==
Its stated mission is to promote Olympism throughout the world and to lead the Olympic Movement:

- To encourage and support the promotion of ethics and good governance in sport;
- To support the education of youth through sport;
- To ensure that the spirit of fair play prevails and violence is avoided;
- To encourage and support the organisation, development, and coordination of sport and sports competitions;
- To ensure the regular celebration of the Olympic Games;
- To cooperate with competent public or private organisations and authorities endeavouring to place sport at the service of humanity and thereby to promote peace;
- To take action to strengthen the unity, independence, political neutrality, and autonomy of the Olympic Movement;
- To encourage and support elected representatives of athletes, working with the IOC Athletes' Commission as their official representative;
- To encourage and support the promotion of women in sport in pursuit of equality between men and women;
- To protect clean athletes and the integrity of sport by leading the fight against doping, and by taking action against all forms of manipulation of competitions and related corruption;
- To encourage and support measures relating to the medical care and health of athletes;
- To oppose any political or commercial abuse of sport and athletes;
- To encourage and support the efforts of sports organisations and public authorities to provide for the social and professional future of athletes;
- To encourage and support the development of sport for all;
- To encourage and support a responsible concern for environmental issues, to promote sustainable development in sport and to require that the Olympic Games are operated accordingly;
- To promote a positive legacy from the Olympic Games to the host cities, regions, and countries;
- To encourage and support initiatives blending sport with culture and education;
- To encourage and support the activities of the International Olympic Academy ("IOA") and other institutions which dedicate themselves to Olympic education;
- To promote safe sport and the protection of athletes from all forms of harassment and abuse.

As defined by the IOC, sport pertains to a form of competitive and organised physical activity or game that aims to use or improve physical fitness and skills while providing passion, cooperation, and entertainment to participants and spectators alike.

== IOC member oath ==
All IOC members must swear to the following:

"Honoured to be chosen as a member of the International Olympic Committee, I fully accept all the responsibilities that this office brings: I promise to serve the Olympic Movement to the best of my ability. I will respect the Olympic Charter and accept the decisions of the IOC. I will always act independently of commercial and political interests as well as of any racial or religious consideration. I will fully comply with the IOC Code of Ethics. I promise to fight against all forms of discrimination and dedicate myself in all circumstances to promote the interests of the International Olympic Committee and Olympic Movement."

== History ==
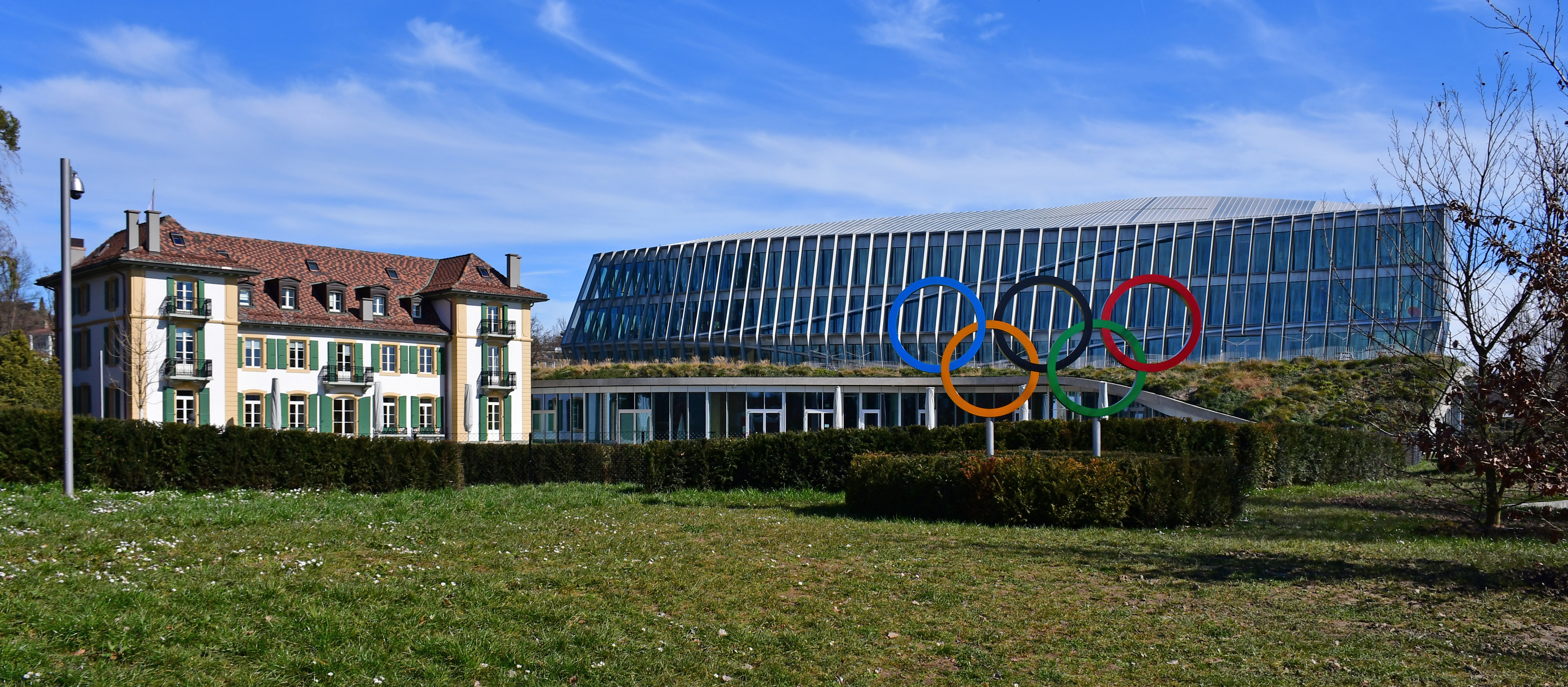
Current IOC headquarters in Lausanne, Switzerland

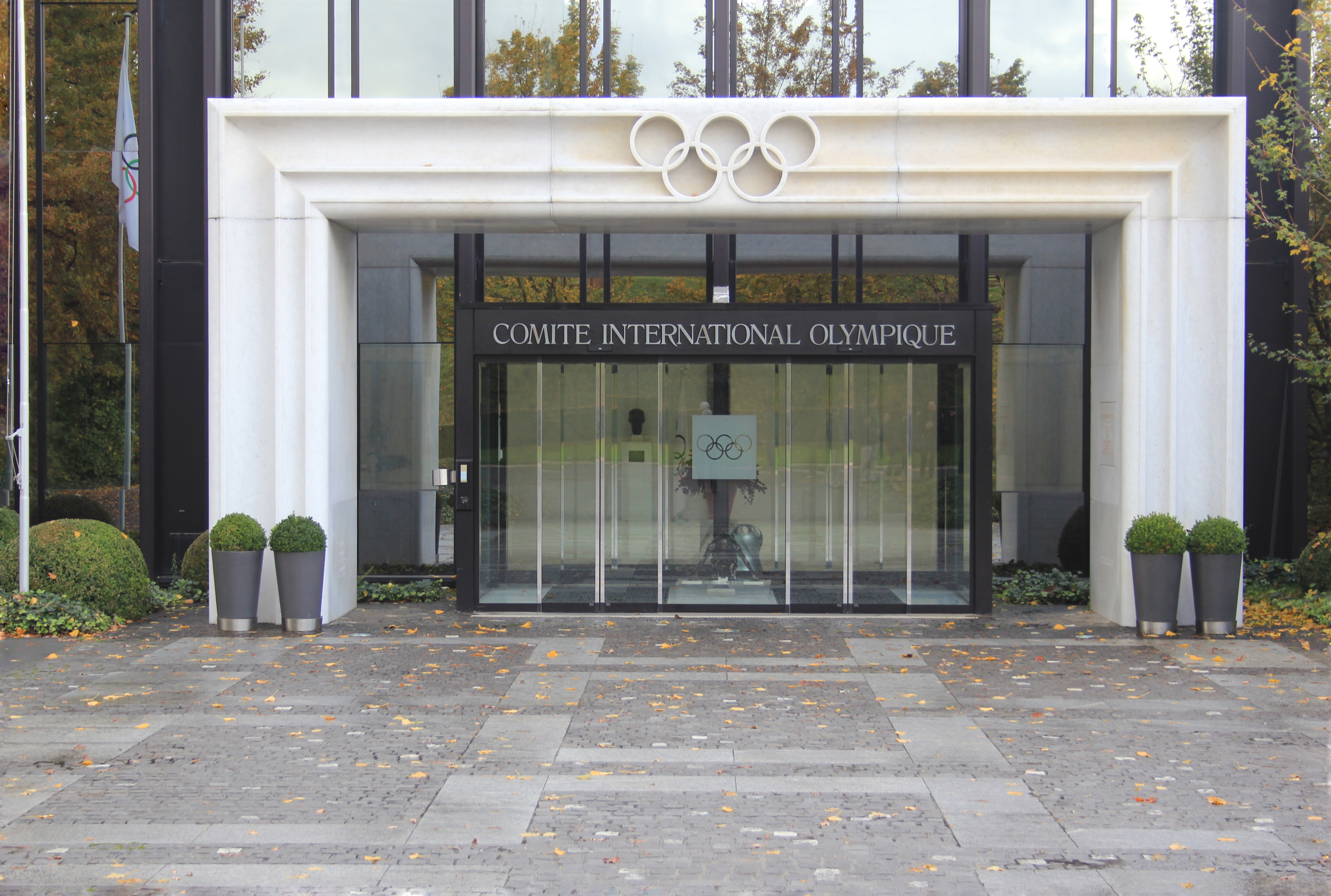
The main entrance of the former headquarters of the International Olympic Committee in Lausanne

The IOC was created by Pierre de Coubertin on 23 June 1894 with Demetrios Vikelas as its first president. The IOC is one of the earliest and is still one of the most powerful international NGOs. As of February 2022, its membership consists of 105 active members and 45 honorary members. The IOC is the supreme authority of the worldwide modern Olympic Movement.

The IOC organises the modern Olympic Games and Youth Olympic Games (YOG), held in summer and winter every four years. The first Summer Olympics was held in Athens, Greece, in 1896; the first Winter Olympics was in Chamonix, France, in 1924. The first Summer YOG was in Singapore in 2010, and the first Winter YOG was in Innsbruck, Austria in 2012.

Until 1992, both the Summer and Winter Olympics were held in the same year. After that year, however, the IOC shifted the Winter Olympics to the even years between Summer Games to help space the planning of the two events from one another, and to improve the financial balance of the IOC, which receives a proportionally greater advertising and other income in Olympic years.

Since 1995, the IOC has worked to address environmental health concerns resulting from hosting the games. In 1995, IOC President Juan Antonio Samaranch stated, "the International Olympic Committee is resolved to ensure that the environment becomes the third dimension of the organisation of the Olympic Games, the first and second being sport and culture." Acting on this statement, in 1996 the IOC added the "environment" as a third pillar to its vision for the Olympic Games.

In 2000, the "Green Olympics" effort was developed by the Beijing Organising Committee for the Beijing Olympic Games. The Beijing 2008 Summer Olympics executed over 160 projects addressing the goals of improved air quality and water quality, sustainable energy, improved waste management, and environmental education. These projects included industrial plant relocation or closure, furnace replacement, introduction of new emission standards, and more strict traffic control.

In 2009, the UN General Assembly granted the IOC Permanent Observer status. The decision enables the IOC to be directly involved in the UN Agenda and to attend UN General Assembly meetings where it can take the floor. In 1993, the General Assembly approved a Resolution to further solidify IOC–UN cooperation by reviving the Olympic Truce.

The IOC received approval in November 2015 to construct a new headquarters in Vidy, Lausanne. The cost of the project was estimated to stand at $156m. The IOC announced on 11 February 2019 that the "Olympic House" would be inaugurated on 23 June 2019 to coincide with its 125th anniversary. The Olympic Museum remains in Ouchy, Lausanne.

Since 2002, the IOC has been involved in several high-profile controversies including taking gifts, its DMCA take down request of the 2008 Tibetan protest videos, Russian doping scandals, and its support of the Beijing 2022 Winter Olympics despite China's human rights violations documented in the Xinjiang Papers.

Detailed frameworks for environmental sustainability were prepared for the 2018 Winter Olympics and 2020 Summer Olympics in PyeongChang, South Korea, and Tokyo, Japan, respectively.

In September 2024, the IOC revealed its list of candidates for the presidency, featuring Sebastian Coe, David Lappartient, Kirsty Coventry, and Juan Antonio Samaranch Salisachs among the seven contenders. The other candidates included Prince Faisal bin Hussein and the Presidents of the International Ski and Snowboard Federation and the International Gymnastics Federation, Johan Eliasch and Morinari Watanabe.

In February 2025, the IOC announced the inaugural Olympic Esports Games would take place in 2027 in Riyadh, the capital city of Saudi Arabia. The IOC will collaborate with the Esports World Cup Foundation (EWCF) to produce the event, which President Thomas Bach called "historic".

In March 2025, Kirsty Coventry became the first woman and the first African to be elected as President of the IOC. Coventry's vision for the Olympics emphasises making the Games accessible to everyone again, no matter where they were born, while aiming to leverage sports as a global unifier. In parallel, the IOC is focused on strengthening its collaboration with BRICS nations, fostering a spirit of unity and cooperation through sports, and encouraging the idea of the Olympics as a truly global event.

In June 2026, the International Olympic Committee approved amendments to the Olympic Charter aiming to strengthen the political neutrality of sport and introducing a new framework under which individual disciplines, rather than entire sports, will be evaluated for inclusion in the Olympic programme from the 2032 Brisbane Games.

== Organisation ==
It is an association under the Swiss Civil Code (articles 60–79).

=== IOC Session ===
The IOC Session is the general meeting of the IOC, held once a year, at which each member has one vote. It is the IOC's supreme organ, and its decisions are final.

Extraordinary Sessions may be convened by the President or upon the written request of at least one-third of the members.

Among others, the powers of the Session are:

- To adopt or amend the Olympic Charter.
- To elect the members of the IOC, the Honorary President and the honorary members.
- To elect the President, the vice-presidents and all other members of the IOC Executive Board.
- To elect the host city of the Olympic Games.

=== Subsidiaries ===
- Olympic Foundation (Lausanne, Switzerland)
- Olympic Refuge Foundation (Lausanne, Switzerland)
- IOC Television and Marketing Services S.A. (Lausanne, Switzerland)
- The Olympic Partner Programme (Lausanne, Switzerland)
- Olympic Broadcasting Services S.A. (Lausanne, Switzerland)
- Olympic Broadcasting Services S.L. (Madrid, Spain)
- Olympic Channel Services S.A. (Lausanne, Switzerland)
- Olympic Channel Services S.L. (Madrid, Spain)
- Olympic Foundation for Culture and Heritage (Lausanne, Switzerland)
- IOC Heritage Management
- Olympic Studies Centre
- Olympic Museum (Lausanne, Switzerland)
- International Programmes for Arts, Culture and Education
- Olympic Solidarity (Lausanne, Switzerland)

== IOC members ==
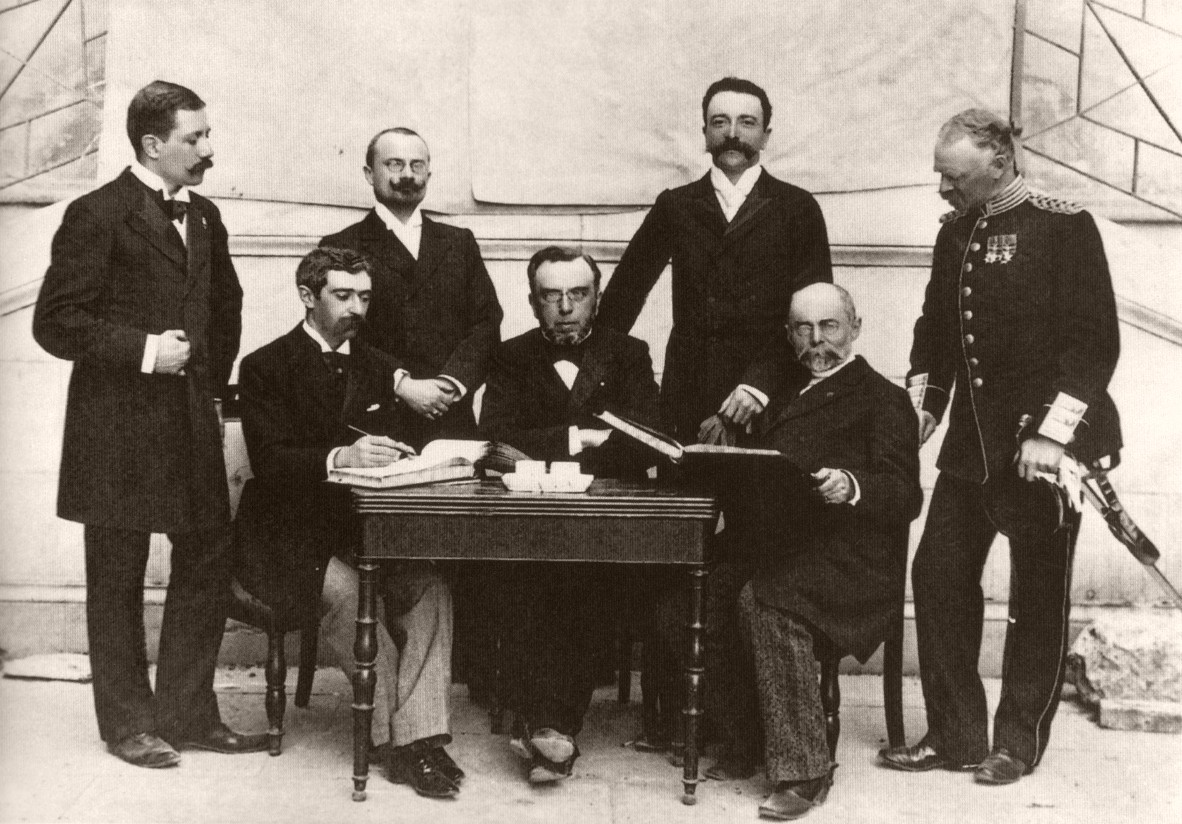
The first IOC, at the 1896 Athens Games From left to right, standing: Gebhardt (Germany), Guth-Jarkovský (Bohemia), Kemeny (Hungary), Balck (Sweden); seated: Coubertin (France), Vikelas (Greece & chairman), Butovsky (Russia)

The number of all serving IOC members may not exceed 115. When named, they became IOC members in their respective countries rather than representatives of those countries to the IOC.

Categories of the IOC members include:

- Athlete representatives from the IOC Athletes' Commission (IOC AC);
- Representatives from international sports federations (IFs), associations of IFs or other organisations recognised by the IOC;
- Representatives from National Olympic Committees (NOCs), or world or continental associations of NOCs;
- Individual members, whose memberships are not linked to any specific functions in said organisations.

=== Cessation of membership ===
Membership ends under the following circumstances:

- Resignation: any IOC member may end their membership at any time by delivering a written resignation to the President.
- Non-re-election: any IOC member ceases to be a member without further formality if they are not re-elected.
- Age limit: any IOC member ceases to be a member at the end of the calendar year during which they reach the age of 70 or 80. Any member who joined in the 1900s ceases to be a member at age 80, and any member who joined in the 2000s ceases to be a member at age 70.
- Failure to attend sessions or take an active part in IOC work for two consecutive years.
- Transfer of domicile or of the main centre of interests to a country other than their country at the time of their election.
- Members elected as active athletes cease to be members upon ceasing to be members of the IOC Athletes' Commission.
- Presidents and individuals holding an executive or senior leadership position within NOCs, world or continental associations of NOCs, IFs or associations of IFs, or other organisations recognised by the IOC cease to be a member upon ceasing to exercise the function they were exercising at the time of their election.
- Expulsion: an IOC member may be expelled by decision of the session if such member has betrayed their oath or if the Session considers that such member has neglected or knowingly jeopardised the interests of the IOC or acted in a way which is unworthy of the IOC.

=== Sports federations recognised by IOC ===
IOC recognises 82 international sports federations (IFs):

- The 33 members of the Association of Summer Olympic International Federations (ASOIF).
- The 7 members of the Association of International Olympic Winter Sports Federations (AIOWF).
- The 42 members of the Association of IOC Recognised International Sports Federations (ARISF).

== Honours ==
IOC awards gold, silver, and bronze medals for the top three competitors in each sporting event.

Other honours:

- Pierre de Coubertin Medal: athletes who demonstrate a special spirit of sportsmanship
- Olympic Cup: institutions or associations with a record of merit and integrity in developing the Olympic Movement
- Olympic Order: individuals for exceptionally distinguished contributions to the Olympic Movement; superseded the Olympic Certificate
- Olympic Laurel: individuals who promote education, culture, development, and peace through sport
- Olympic town status: towns that have been particularly important for the Olympic Movement
- Coaches' Lifetime Achievement Awards

== Olympic marketing ==
During the first half of the 20th century, the IOC ran on a small budget. As IOC president from 1952 to 1972, Avery Brundage rejected all attempts to link the Olympics with commercial interests. Brundage believed that corporate interests would unduly impact the IOC's decision-making. Brundage's resistance to this revenue stream left IOC organising committees to negotiate their own sponsorship contracts and use the Olympic symbols.

When Brundage retired, the IOC had US$2 million in assets; eight years later coffers had swollen to US$45 million. This was primarily due to a shift in ideology toward expansion of the Games through corporate sponsorship and the sale of television rights. When Juan Antonio Samaranch was elected IOC president in 1980, he desired to make the IOC financially independent. Samaranch appointed Canadian IOC member Richard Pound to lead the initiative as Chairman of the "New Sources of Finance Commission".

In 1982, the IOC drafted International Sport and Leisure, a Swiss sports marketing company, to develop a global marketing programme for the Olympic Movement. ISL developed the programme, but was replaced by Meridian Management, a company partly owned by the IOC in the early 1990s. In 1989, a staff member at ISL Marketing, Michael Payne, moved to the IOC and became the organisation's first marketing director. ISL and then Meridian continued in the established role as the IOC's sales and marketing agents until 2002. In collaboration with ISL Marketing and Meridian Management, Payne made major contributions to the creation of a multibillion-dollar sponsorship marketing programme for the organisation which, along with improvements in TV marketing and improved financial management, helped to restore the IOC's financial viability.

=== Revenue ===
The Olympic Movement generates revenue through five major programmes.

- Broadcast partnerships, managed by the IOC.
- Commercial sponsorship, organised through the IOC's worldwide TOP programme.
- Domestic sponsorship, managed by the Organising Committees for the Olympic Games (OCOGs).
- Ticketing.
- Licensing programmes within host countries.

The OCOGs have responsibility for domestic sponsorship, ticketing and licensing programmes, under the direction of the IOC. The Olympic Movement generated a total of more than US$4 billion (€2.5 billion) in revenue during the Olympic quadrennium from 2001 to 2004.

Revenue distribution

The IOC distributes some of its revenue to organisations throughout the Olympic Movement to support the staging of the Olympic Games and to promote worldwide sport development. The IOC retains approximately 10% of the Olympic marketing revenue for operational and administrative costs. For the 2013–2016 period, the IOC had revenues of about US$5.0 billion, of which 73% were from broadcasting rights and 18% were from Olympic Partners. The Rio 2016 organising committee received US$1.5 billion and the Sochi 2014 organising committee received US$833 million. National Olympic committees and international federations received US$739 million each.

In July 2000, when the Los Angeles Times reported on how the IOC redistributes profits from sponsorships and broadcasting rights, historian Bob Barney stated that he had "yet to see matters of corruption in the IOC", but noted there were "matters of unaccountability". He later noted that when the spotlight is on the athletes, it has "the power to eclipse impressions of scandal or corruption", with respect to the Olympic bid process.

=== Organising Committees for the Olympic Games ===
The IOC provides TOP programme contributions and broadcast revenue to the OCOGs to support the staging of the Olympic Games:

- TOP programme revenue: the two OCOGs of each Olympic quadrennium generally share approximately 50% of TOP programme revenue and value-in-kind contributions, with approximately 30% provided to the summer OCOG and 20% provided to the winter OCOG.
- Broadcast revenue: the IOC contributes 49% of the Olympic broadcast revenue for each Games to the OCOG. During the 2001–2004 Olympic quadrennium, the Salt Lake 2002 Organizing Committee received US$443 million, €395 million in broadcast revenue from the IOC, and the Athens 2004 Organising Committee received US$732 million, €690 million.
- Domestic programme revenue: the OCOGs generate substantial revenue from the domestic marketing programmes that they manage within the host country, including domestic sponsorship, ticketing, and licensing.

=== National Olympic Committees ===
NOCs receive financial support for training and developing their Olympic teams, Olympic athletes, and Olympic hopefuls. The IOC distributes TOP programme revenue to each NOC. The IOC also contributes Olympic broadcast revenue to Olympic Solidarity, an IOC organisation that provides financial support to NOCs with the greatest need. The continued success of the TOP programme and Olympic broadcast agreements has enabled the IOC to provide increased support for the NOCs with each Olympic quadrennium. The IOC provided approximately US$318.5 million to NOCs for the 2001–2004 quadrennium.

=== International Olympic Sports Federations ===
The IOC is the largest single revenue source for the majority of IOSFs, with contributions that assist them in developing their respective sports. The IOC provides financial support to the 28 IOSFs of Olympic summer sports and the seven IOSFs of Olympic winter sports. The continually increasing value of Olympic broadcasts has enabled the IOC to substantially increase financial support to IOSFs with each successive Games. The seven winter sports IFs shared US$85.8 million, €75 million in Salt Lake 2002 broadcast revenue.

=== Other organisations ===
The IOC contributes Olympic marketing revenue to the programmes of various recognised international sports organisations, including the International Paralympic Committee (IPC), and the World Anti-Doping Agency (WADA).

== Environmental concerns ==
The IOC requires cities bidding to host the Olympics to provide a comprehensive strategy to protect the environment in preparation for hosting, and following the conclusion of the Games.

=== IOC approaches ===
The IOC has four major approaches to addressing environmental health concerns.

- IOC Sustainability and Legacy Commission focuses on how the IOC can improve the strategies and policies associated with environmental health throughout the process of hosting the Olympic Games.
- Every candidate city must provide information on environmental health issues such as air quality and environmental impact assessments.
- Every host city is given the option to declare "pledges" to address specific or general environmental health concerns.
- Every host city must collaborate with the United Nations to work towards addressing environmental health objectives.

=== Venue construction ===
==== Effects on air ====
Host cities have concerns about traffic congestion and air pollution, both of which can compromise air quality during and after venue construction. Various air quality improvement measures are undertaken before and after each event. Traffic control is the primary method to reduce concentrations of air pollutants, including barring heavy vehicles.

===== Beijing Olympics =====
Research at the 2008 Summer Olympics identified particulate matter – measured in terms of PM10 (the amount of aerodynamic diameter of particle ≤ 10 μm in a given amount of air) – as a top priority. Particulate matter, along with other airborne pollutants, cause both serious health problems, such as asthma, and damage urban ecosystems. Black carbon is released into the air from incomplete combustion of carbonaceous fluids, contributing to climate change and injuring human health. Secondary pollutants such as CO, NOx, SO2, benzene, toluene, ethylbenzene, and xylenes (BTEX) are also released during construction.

For the Beijing Olympics, vehicles not meeting the Euro 1 emission standards were banned, and the odd-even rule was implemented in the Beijing administrative area. Air quality improvement measures implemented by the Beijing government included replacing coal with natural gas, suspending construction, imposing strict dust control on construction sites, closing or relocating the polluting industrial plants, building long subway lines, using cleaner fluid in power plants, and reducing the activity by some of the polluting factories. There, levels of primary and secondary pollutants were reduced, and good air quality was recorded during the Beijing Olympics on most days. Beijing also sprayed silver iodide in the atmosphere to induce rain to remove existing pollutants from the air.

==== Effects on soil ====
Soil contamination can occur during construction. The Sydney Olympic Games of 2000 resulted in improving a highly contaminated area known as Homebush Bay. A pre-Games study reported soil metal concentrations high enough to potentially contaminate groundwater. A remediation strategy was developed. Contaminated soil was consolidated into four containment areas within the site, which left the remaining areas available for recreational use. The site contained waste materials that then no longer posed a threat to surrounding aquifers. In the 2006 Games in Torino, Italy, soil impacts were observed. Before the Games, researchers studied four areas that the Games would likely affect: a floodplain, a highway, the motorway connecting the city to Lyon, France, and a landfill. They analysed the chemicals in these areas before and after the Games. Their findings revealed an increase in the number of metals in the topsoil post-Games, and indicated that soil was capable of buffering the effects of many but not all heavy metals. Mercury, lead, and arsenic may have been transferred into the food chain.

One promise made to Londoners for the 2012 Olympic Games was that the Olympic Park would be a "blueprint for sustainable living." However, garden allotments were temporarily relocated due to the building of the Olympic stadium. The allotments were eventually returned. However, the soil quality was damaged. Further, allotment residents were exposed to radioactive waste for five months prior to moving, during the excavation of the site for the Games. Other local residents, construction workers, and onsite archaeologists faced similar exposures and risks.

==== Effects on water ====
The Olympic Games can affect water quality in several ways, including runoff and the transfer of polluting substances from the air to water sources through rainfall. Harmful particulates come from natural substances (such as plant matter crushed by higher volumes of pedestrian and vehicle traffic) and man-made substances (such as exhaust from vehicles or industry). Contaminants from these two categories elevate amounts of toxins in street dust. Street dust reaches water sources through runoff, facilitating the transfer of toxins to environments and communities that rely on these water sources.

In 2013, researchers in Beijing found a significant relationship between the amount of PM2.5 concentrations in the air and in rainfall. Studies showed that rainfall had transferred a large portion of these pollutants from the air to water sources. Notably, this cleared the air of such particulates, substantially improving air quality at the venues.

== Reception and incidences ==
=== Amateurism and professionalism ===
De Coubertin was influenced by the aristocratic ethos exemplified by English public schools. The public schools subscribed to the belief that sport formed an important part of education but that practicing or training was considered cheating. As class structure evolved through the 20th century, the definition of the amateur athlete as an aristocratic gentleman became outdated. The advent of the state-sponsored "full-time amateur athlete" of Eastern Bloc countries further eroded the notion of the pure amateur, as it put Western, self-financed amateurs at a disadvantage. The Soviet Union entered teams of athletes who were all nominally students, soldiers, or working in a profession, but many of whom were paid by the state to train on a full-time basis. Nevertheless, the IOC held to the traditional rules regarding amateurism.

Near the end of the 1960s, the Canadian Amateur Hockey Association (CAHA) felt their amateur players could no longer be competitive against the Soviet full-time athletes and other constantly improving European teams. They pushed for the ability to use players from professional leagues, but met opposition from the IIHF and IOC. At the IIHF Congress in 1969, the IIHF decided to allow Canada to use nine non-NHL professional hockey players at the 1970 World Championships in Montreal and Winnipeg, Manitoba, Canada. The decision was reversed in January 1970 after Brundage declared that the change would put ice hockey's status as an Olympic sport in jeopardy. In response, Canada withdrew from international ice hockey competition and officials stated that they would not return until "open competition" was instituted.

Beginning in the 1970s, amateurism was gradually phased out of the Olympic Charter. After the 1988 Games, the IOC decided to make all professional athletes eligible for the Olympics, subject to the approval of the IFOSs.

=== Bid controversies ===
==== 1976 Winter Olympics ====
The Games were originally awarded to Denver on 12 May 1970, but a steep rise in costs led to Colorado voters' rejection on 7 November 1972, by 60% of the vote, of a $5 million bond issue to finance the Games with public funds.

Denver officially withdrew on 15 November: the IOC then offered the Games to Whistler, British Columbia, Canada, but they too declined due to a change of government following elections.

Salt Lake City, Utah, a 1972 Winter Olympics final candidate (who eventually hosted the 2002 Winter Olympics) offered itself as a potential host after Denver's withdrawal, but the IOC declined Salt Lake City's offer. On 5 February 1973, the IOC invited Innsbruck, the city that had hosted the Games twelve years earlier.

==== 1998 Winter Olympics ====
Eight years after the 1998 Winter Olympics, a report ordered by the Nagano region's governor said the Japanese city provided millions of dollars in an "illegitimate and excessive level of hospitality" to IOC members, including US$4.4 million spent on entertainment. Earlier reports put the figure at approximately US$14 million. The precise figures are unknown: after the IOC asked that the entertainment expenditures not be made public Nagano destroyed its financial records.

==== 2002 Winter Olympics ====
A scandal broke on 10 December 1998, when Swiss IOC member Marc Hodler, head of the coordination committee overseeing the organisation of the 2002 Games, announced that several members of the IOC had received gifts from members of the Salt Lake City 2002 bid Committee in exchange for votes. Soon four independent investigations were underway: by the IOC, the United States Olympic Committee (USOC), the SLOC, and the United States Department of Justice. Before any of the investigations could get under way, SLOC co-heads Tom Welch and David Johnson both resigned their posts. Many others soon followed. The Department of Justice filed fifteen counts of bribery and fraud against the pair.

As a result of the investigation, ten IOC members were expelled and another ten were sanctioned. Stricter rules were adopted for future bids, and caps were put into place as to how much IOC members could accept from bid cities. Additionally, new term and age limits were put into place for IOC membership, an Athlete's Commission was created and fifteen former Olympic athletes gained provisional membership status.

==== 2008 Summer Olympics ====
In 2000, international human rights groups attempted to pressure the IOC to reject Beijing's bid to protest human rights in the People's Republic of China. One Chinese dissident was sentenced to two years in prison during an IOC tour. After the city won the 2008 Summer Olympic Games, Amnesty International and others expressed concerns regarding the human rights situation. The second principle in the Fundamental Principles of Olympism, Olympic Charter states that "The goal of Olympism is to place sport at the service of the harmonious development of man, with a view to promoting a peaceful society concerned with the preservation of human dignity." Amnesty International considered PRC policies and practices as violating that principle.

Some days before the Opening Ceremonies, in August 2008, the IOC issued DMCA take down notices on Tibetan Protests videos on YouTube. YouTube and the Electronic Frontier Foundation (EFF) pushed back against the IOC, which then withdrew their complaint.

==== 2016 and 2020 Summer Olympics ====
On 1 March 2016, Owen Gibson of The Guardian reported that French financial prosecutors investigating corruption in world athletics had expanded their remit to include the bidding and voting processes for the 2016 Summer Olympics and 2020 Summer Olympics. The story followed an earlier report in January by Gibson, who revealed that Papa Massata Diack, the son of then-IAAF president Lamine Diack, appeared to arrange for "parcels" to be delivered to six IOC members in 2008 when Qatar was bidding for the 2016 Summer Olympic Games, though it failed to make it beyond the shortlist. Weeks later, Qatari authorities denied the allegations. Gibson then reported that a €1.3 million (£1 million, $1.5 million) payment from the Tokyo Olympic Committee team to an account linked to Papa Diack was made during Japan's successful race to host the 2020 Summer Games. The following day, French prosecutors confirmed they were investigating allegations of "corruption and money laundering" of more than $2m in suspicious payments made by the Tokyo 2020 Olympic bid committee to a secret bank account linked to Diack. Tsunekazu Takeda of the Tokyo 2020 bid committee responded on 17 May 2016, denying allegations of wrongdoing, and refused to reveal transfer details. The controversy was reignited on 11 January 2019 after it emerged Takeda had been indicted on corruption charges in France over his role in the bid process.

==== 2022 Winter Olympics ====
In 2014, at the final stages of the bid process for 2022, Oslo, seen as the favourite, surprised with a withdrawal. Following a string of local controversies over the masterplan, local officials were outraged by IOC demands on athletes and the Olympic family. These demands allegedly included lavish treatment of stakeholders, notably through the creation of separate lanes to "on all roads where IOC members [would] travel, which [were] not to be used by regular people or public transportation", and exclusive cars and drivers for IOC members. The differential treatment irritated Norwegians. The IOC demanded "control over all advertising space throughout Oslo and the subsites during the Games, to be used exclusively by official sponsors."

Human rights groups and governments criticised the committee for allowing Beijing to bid for the 2022 Winter Olympics. Some weeks before the Opening Ceremonies, the Xinjiang Papers were released, documenting abuses by the Chinese government against the Uyghur population in Xinjiang, documenting what many governments described as genocide.

Many government officials, notably those in the United States and the Great Britain, called for a boycott of the 2022 Winter Games. The IOC responded to concerns by saying that the Olympic Games must not be politicised. Some nations diplomatically boycotted games, which prohibited a diplomatic delegation from representing a nation at the games, rather than a full boycott that would have barred athletes from competing. In September 2021, the IOC suspended the Olympic Committee of the Democratic People's Republic of Korea, after they boycotted the 2020 Summer Olympics claiming "COVID-19 Concerns".

On 8 September 2021, after the IOC suspended the North Korean NOC for not being present at the 2020 Summer Olympics, there was speculation about whether the IOC was also intending to send a message to nations considering a boycott of the games that they could be banned from participation in future Olympic Games if they chose to boycott this edition. On 14 October 2021, vice-president of the IOC, John Coates, announced that the IOC had no plans to challenge the Chinese government on humanitarian issues, stating that the issues were "not within the IOC's remit".

=== Sex verification controversies ===
During March 2026, the International Olympic Committee announced a new policy protecting women's category, ensuring only athletes classified as biological females can compete in it, using genetic sex screening to determine eligibility. The new policy aims to create a consistent rule across all Olympic sports and prioritize fairness and safety during competition, while allowing athletes who do not meet the criteria to compete in male or open categories.

Verifying the sex of Olympic participants dates back to ancient Greece, when Kallipateira attempted to break Greek law by dressing as a man to enter the arena as a trainer. After she was discovered, a policy was erected wherein trainers, just as athletes, were made to appear naked in order to better assure all were male.

Into the late 2010s, sex verification has taken many forms and been subject to dispute. Before sex testing, Olympic officials relied on "nude parades" and doctor's notes. Successful women athletes perceived to be masculine were most likely to be inspected. In 1966, IOC implemented a compulsory sex verification process that took effect at the 1968 Winter Olympics where a lottery system was used to determine who would be inspected with a Barr body test. The scientific community found fault with this policy. The use of the Barr body test was evaluated by fifteen geneticists who unanimously agreed it was scientifically invalid. By the 1970s this method was replaced with PCR testing, as well as evaluating factors such as brain anatomy and behaviour. Following continued backlash against mandatory sex testing, the IOC Athletes' Commission's opposition ended of the practice in 1999.

Although sex testing was no longer mandated, women who did not present as feminine continued to be inspected based on suspicion. This started at 2000 Summer Olympics and remained in use until the 2010 Winter Olympics. By 2011 the IOC created a Hyperandrogenism Regulation, which aimed to standardise natural testosterone levels in women athletes. This transition in sex testing was to assure fairness within female events. This was due to the belief that higher testosterone levels increased athletic ability and gave unfair advantages to intersex and transgender competitors. Any female athlete flagged for suspicion and whose testosterone surpassed regulation levels was prohibited from competing until medical treatment brought their hormone levels within standard levels. It has been argued by press, scholars, and politicians that some ethnicities are disproportionately impacted by this regulation and that the rule excludes too many.

The most notable cases of bans testing results are: Maria José Martínez-Patiño (1985), Santhi Soundarajan (2006), Caster Semenya (2009), Annet Negesa (2012), and Dutee Chand (2014).

Before the 2014 Asian Games, Indian athlete Dutee Chand was banned from competing internationally having been found to be in violation of the Hyperandrogenism Regulation. Following the denial of her appeal by the Court of Arbitration for Sport, the IOC suspended the policy for the 2016 Summer Olympics and 2018 Winter Olympics.

=== London 2012 and the Munich massacre ===
Before the start of the 2012 Summer Olympic Games, the IOC decided not to hold a minute of silence to honour the 11 Israeli Olympians who were killed 40 years prior in the Munich massacre. Jacques Rogge, the then-IOC President, said it would be "inappropriate" to do so. Speaking of the decision, Israeli Olympian Shaul Ladany, who had survived the Munich Massacre, commented: "I do not understand. I do not understand, and I do not accept it".

=== Wrestling ===
In February 2013, the IOC excluded wrestling from its core Olympic sports for the Summer Olympic programme for the 2020 Summer Olympics, because the sport did not offer equal opportunities for men and women. This decision was attacked by the sporting community, given the wrestling's long tradition at the Olympics. After reassessment, however, wrestling was placed among the core Olympic sports again, a status it will hold until at least 2032.

=== Russian doping ===
Media attention began growing in December 2014 when German broadcaster ARD reported on state-sponsored doping in Russia, comparing it to doping in East Germany. In November 2015, the World Anti-Doping Agency (WADA) published a report and the World Athletics (then known as the IAAF) suspended Russia indefinitely from world track and field events. The United Kingdom Anti-Doping agency later assisted WADA with testing in Russia. In June 2016, they reported that they were unable to fully carry out their work and noted intimidation by armed Federal Security Service (FSB) agents. After a Russian former lab director made allegations about the 2014 Winter Olympics in Sochi, WADA commissioned an independent investigation led by Richard McLaren. McLaren's investigation found corroborating evidence, concluding in a report published in July 2016 that the Ministry of Sport and the FSB had operated a "state-directed failsafe system" using a "disappearing positive [test] methodology" (DPM) from "at least late 2011 to August 2015".

In response to these findings, WADA announced that RUSADA should be regarded as non-compliant with respect to the World Anti-Doping Code and recommended that Russia be banned from competing at the 2016 Summer Olympics. The IOC rejected the recommendation, stating that a separate decision would be made for each athlete by the relevant IF and the IOC, based on the athlete's individual circumstances. One day prior to the opening ceremony, 270 athletes were cleared to compete under the Russian flag, while 167 were removed because of doping. In contrast, the entire Kuwaiti team was banned from competing under their own flag (for a non-doping related matter).

In contrast to the IOC, the IPC voted unanimously to ban the entire Russian team from the 2016 Summer Paralympics, having found evidence that the DPM was also in operation at the 2014 Winter Paralympics.

On 5 December 2017, the IOC announced that the Russian Olympic Committee had been suspended effective immediately from the 2018 Winter Olympics. Athletes who had no previous drug violations and a consistent history of drug testing were allowed to compete under the Olympic Flag as an "Olympic Athlete from Russia" (OAR). Under the terms of the decree, Russian government officials were barred from the Games, and neither the country's flag nor anthem would be present. The Olympic Flag and Olympic Anthem would be used instead, and on 20 December 2017 the IOC proposed an alternate uniform logo.

On 1 February 2018, the Court of Arbitration for Sport (CAS) found that the IOC provided insufficient evidence for 28 athletes, and overturned their IOC sanctions. For 11 other athletes, the CAS decided that there was sufficient evidence to uphold their Sochi sanctions, but reduced their lifetime bans to only the 2018 Winter Olympics. The IOC said in a statement that "the result of the CAS decision does not mean that athletes from the group of 28 will be invited to the Games. Not being sanctioned does not automatically confer the privilege of an invitation" and that "this [case] may have a serious impact on the future fight against doping". The IOC found it important to note that the CAS Secretary General "insisted that the CAS decision does not mean that these 28 athletes are innocent" and that they would consider an appeal against the court's decision. Later that month, the Russian Olympic Committee was reinstated by the IOC, despite numerous failed drug tests by Russian athletes in the 2018 Olympics. The Russian Anti-Doping Agency was re-certified in September, despite the Russian rejection of the McLaren Report.

=== 2018 plebiscite in Taiwan ===
On 24 November 2018, the Taiwanese government held a referendum over a change in the naming of their National Olympic Committee, from "Chinese Taipei", a name agreed to in 1981 by the People's Republic of China in the Nagoya Protocol, which denies the Republic of China's legitimacy, to simply "Taiwan", after the main island in the Free Area. In the immediate days prior to the referendum, the IOC and the PRC government, issued a threatening statement, suggesting that if the team underwent the name change, the IOC had the legal right to make a "suspension of or forced withdrawal," of the team from the 2020 Summer Olympics. In response to the allegations of election interference, the IOC stated, "The IOC does not interfere with local procedures and fully respects freedom of expression. However, to avoid any unnecessary expectations or speculations, the IOC wishes to reiterate that this matter is under its jurisdiction." Subsequently, with a significant PRC pressure, the referendum failed in Taiwan with 45% to 54%.

=== Peng Shuai disappearance ===
In November 2021, the IOC was again criticised by Human Rights Watch (HRW) and others for its response to the 2021 disappearance of Peng Shuai, following her publishing of sexual assault allegations against a former Chinese vice premier, and high-ranking member of the Chinese Communist Party, Zhang Gaoli. The IOC's response was internationally criticised as complicit in assisting the Chinese government to silence Peng's sexual assault allegations. Zhang Gaoli previously led the Beijing bidding committee to host the 2022 Winter Olympics.

=== Fencing handshaking controversy ===
In July 2020 (and reconfirmed in September 2020 and in January 2021), the FIE replaced its previous handshake requirement with a "salute" by the opposing fencers, writing in a public notice that handshakes were "suspended until further notice." Nevertheless, in July 2023, the Ukrainian four-time world champion Olga Kharlan was disqualified at the World Fencing Championships for not shaking the hand of her defeated Russian opponent, although Kharlan instead offered a tapping of blades in acknowledgement. The President of the IOC, Thomas Bach, sent a letter to Kharlan in which he expressed empathy for her, and wrote that in light of the situation she was guaranteed a spot in the 2024 Summer Olympics. He wrote further: "as a fellow fencer, it is impossible for me to imagine how you feel at this moment. The war against your country, the suffering of the people in Ukraine, the uncertainty around your participation at the Fencing World Championships ... and then the events which unfolded yesterday – all this is a roller coaster of emotions and feelings. It is admirable how you are managing this incredibly difficult situation, and I would like to express my full support to you. Rest assured that the IOC will continue to stand in full solidarity with the Ukrainian athletes and the Olympic community of Ukraine."

=== Russian invasion of Ukraine ===
Following the Russian invasion of Ukraine on 24 February 2022, which began shortly after the 2022 Winter Olympics, the IOC banned Russia and Belarus and recommended that other international sporting organisers did the same on 28 February 2022.

On 25 January 2023, the IOC published a statement supporting the idea that Russian and Belarusian athletes could be allowed to compete as neutrals, as long as they did not "actively" support the war and as long as Russian and Belarusian flags, anthems, colors, and names were disallowed.

On 12 October 2023, the International Olympic Committee issued a statement stating that after Russia began its full-scale invasion of Ukraine in 2022, the Russian Olympic Committee unilaterally transferred four regions that were originally under the jurisdiction of the National Olympic Committee of Ukraine: Donetsk Oblast, Luhansk Oblast, Kherson Oblast, Zaporizhzhia Oblast were included as members of their own, so the International Olympic Committee announced the suspension of the membership of the Russian Olympic Committee with immediate effect.

On 19 March 2024, the IOC announced that, due to their suspension, Russian and Belarusian athletes would be barred from the 2024 Summer Olympics opening ceremony as neither nation's athletes were invited. Russia responded by accusing the IOC of being "neo-nazis". Under the ruling, Russian athletes would not be allowed to participate in team events, and are not allowed to display the Russian flag. For 2026 Winter Games the IOC plans to continue this line, with approaching the International Biathlon Union and the International Ski and Snowboard Federation to allow Russian athletes compete in Olympic qualifications under a neutral flag.

In December 2025, the IOC recommended lifting restrictions on the participation of Russian and Belarusian athletes in youth competitions in individual and team sports. It also allowed international competitions to be held on Belarusian territory. The ban on Russia remained in place.

In February 2026, during the 2026 Winter Olympics, the IOC banned Ukrainian skeleton pilot Vladyslav Heraskevych after he wore a helmet featuring images of Ukrainian athletes killed during the Russian invasion, saying that it broke its rules. The ban was controversial, with Heraskevych accusing the IOC of fuelling Russian propaganda, Ukrainian president Volodymyr Zelenskyy also criticized the decision, saying it played ″into the hands of aggressors″.

In July 2026, the IOC lifted the suspension on Russia despite the ongoing war after accepting no longer controlling sporting bodies in occupied Ukraine, allowing for Russia to return to international competition. The decision came with caveats "designed to ensure that Russia plays by the rules", including a requirement to pass multiple doping tests, and the IOC also said it would not host events in Russia or invite Russian government officials to its events. While Russia welcomed the decision, it was criticized by others, including British culture secretary Lisa Nandy and Global Athlete director general Rob Koehler, who said that by allowing Russia back into competition despite the war in Ukraine and its history of doping, the IOC was "rewriting and lowering its own standards". Zelenskyy also told the IOC president that more than 600 Ukrainian athletes and coaches have been killed by Russian strikes, adding that hundreds of sports facilities had also been destroyed since the start of the 2022 full-scale war.

=== Israel at the 2024 Summer Olympics ===
In November 2023, Russia accused the IOC of having double standards by not sanctioning Israel due to its military actions in Gaza and its occupation of Palestine, as Palestine is also an IOC member. In January 2024, over 300 Palestinian sports clubs called for Israel to be barred from the 2024 Olympics after Israeli airstrikes had killed Palestine's Olympic football team coach, and damaged the headquarters of the Palestine Olympic Committee in Gaza. Sports organisations from other Arab countries also called for sanctions to be imposed against Israel and for it to be stopped from participating in the 2024 Summer Olympics, due to the Gaza war. The organisations said their concerns were about the war's impact on Palestinian athletes and sports facilities. The IOC cautioned athletes against boycotting or discriminating against others, stating that immediate action will follow any discriminatory behaviour such as the case of Algerian judoka Fethi Nourine, who received a ten-year ban following his refusal to fight Tohar Butbul, an Israeli, in the 2020 Summer Olympics. The IOC also stated that athletes are not to be held accountable for their government's actions. In March 2024, IOC President Thomas Bach made it clear the IOC would allow Israel to participate at the 2024 Summer Olympics and cautioned athletes against boycotts and discrimination.

=== 2024 WADA scandal ===
In July 2024, the IOC threatened to withdraw Salt Lake City's bid to host the 2034 Winter Olympics if U.S. authorities continued to investigate allegations of doping by Chinese swimmers. The IOC insisted that Salt Lake City agree that it may "terminate Olympic host city contracts in cases where the supreme authority of the World Anti-Doping Agency (WADA) in the fight against doping is not fully respected or if the application of the world antidoping code is hindered or undermined." This was intended to undermine the United States Department of Justice's criminal investigation into the allegations that the World Anti-Doping Agency covered up and failed to sanction drug use by Chinese swimmers.

== IOC Executive Board ==
Founded in 1921, The executive board manages the affairs of the IOC. Its members include the President, four Vice Presidents, and ten other members. All members are elected, by secret ballot, by a majority of votes cast, for a four-year term. Meetings can only be conducted if convened by the president or at the request of the majority of its members.

Its responsibilities include:

- Assume the general overall responsibility for the administration of the IOC;
- Monitor the observance of the Olympic Charter;
- Approve the IOC's internal organisation, its organisation chart and all internal regulations relating to its organisation;
- Manage the IOC's finances and prepares an annual report;
- Present a report to the Session on any proposed change of the Olympic Charter, one of its Rules or bye-laws;
- Submit, on proposal of the Nomination Commission, to the IOC Session the names of the persons whom it recommends for election to the IOC;
- Conduct the procedure for acceptance and selection of candidatures for the organisation of the Olympic Games;
- Establish the agenda for the IOC Sessions;
- Upon proposal from the President, it appoints the Director General;
- Enact, in the form it deems most appropriate, (codes, rulings, norms, guidelines, guides, instructions) all regulations necessary to ensure the proper implementation of the Olympic Charter and the organisation of the Olympic Games;
- Organise periodic meetings with the IFs and with the NOCs at least once every two years;
- Create and allocate IOC honorary distinctions;
- Perform all other duties assigned to it by the Session.

Designation	Name	Country
Honorary President	Thomas Bach	Germany
President	Kirsty Coventry	Zimbabwe
Vice Presidents	Nawal El Moutawakel	Morocco
Vice Presidents	Gerardo Werthein	Argentina
Vice Presidents	Pierre-Olivier Beckers-Vieujant	Belgium
Vice Presidents	Juan Antonio Samaranch	Spain
Executive Members	Prince Feisal Al Hussein	Jordan
Executive Members	Mikaela Cojuangco Jaworski	Philippines
Executive Members	Li Lingwei	China
Executive Members	Spyros Capralos	Greece
Executive Members	Kristin Kloster	Norway
Executive Members	Octavian Morariu	Romania
Executive Members	Ingmar De Vos	Belgium
Executive Members	Kim Jae-youl	South Korea
Executive Members	Neven Ilic	Chile
Executive Members	Pau Gasol	Spain
Director General	Christophe De Kepper	Belgium

== IOC Commissions ==
These commissions have individual missions in the Olympic Movement. They may be created by the president, the IOC executive board, or the Olympic Charter. The president is an ex officio member of all commissions, designates its members and determines their dissolution once they have fulfilled their mandates. No commission can hold a meeting without permission of the president unless otherwise noted.

Commission	Chairperson	Country	Mission/Responsibilities
IOC Athletes' Commission	Pau Gasol	Spain	Represent athletes within the Olympic Movement, support them so they can succeed in their sporting and non-sporting careers, and empower the network of athlete representatives.
IOC Athletes' Entourage Commission	Sergey Bubka	Ukraine	Improve the quality and the level of services to athletes by engaging with and uniting the stakeholders.
IOC Audit Committee	Pierre-Olivier Beckers-Vieujant	Belgium	Assist the Director General's Office in fulfilling its responsibilities in terms of risk management, financial reporting, compliance, control and governance.
IOC Esports Commission	David Lappartient	France	Supervise the IOC's Esports and oversee the planning and organisation of upcoming Olympic Esports Games.
IOC Future Host Commission For The Olympic Winter Games	Karl Stoss	Austria	Explore, create and oversee interest in future Olympic Winter Games and Winter Youth Olympic Games.
IOC Future Host Summer Commission For The Games Of The Olympiad	Kolinda Grabar-Kitarovic	Croatia	Explore, create and oversee interest in future Games of the Olympiad and Summer Youth Olympic Games.
IOC Coordination Commission Brisbane 2032	Mikaela Cojuangco Jaworski	Philippines	Supervise the planning and organisation of the Games of the XXXV Olympiad Brisbane 2032.
IOC Coordination Commission French Alps 2030	Pierre-Olivier Beckers-Vieujant	Belgium	Supervise the planning and organisation of the XXVI Olympic Winter Games French Alps 2030.
IOC Coordination Commission Los Angeles 2028	Nicole Hoevertsz	Aruba	Supervise the planning and organisation of the Games of the XXXIV Olympiad Los Angeles 2028.
IOC Coordination Commission Dolomiti-Valtellina 2028 (YOG)	Martin Fourcade	France	Supervise the planning and organisation of the 5th Winter Youth Olympic Games Dolomiti-Valtellina 2028.
IOC Culture and Olympic Heritage Commission	Khunying Patama Leeswadtrakul	Thailand	Supervise all the activities of the Olympic Movement that are related to culture in the broadest sense of the term - art, history, focus on values, academic research and patrimonial collections – with a view to promoting the Olympic ideals as widely as possible, especially among young people all over the world.
IOC Digital and Technology Commission	Gerardo Werthein	Argentina	Supervise all matters relating to marketing and digital programs
IOC Ethics Commission	Patricia O'Brien	Ireland	Safeguard the ethical principles of the Olympic Movement, keep the Code of Ethics updated, examines situations involving possible breaches of the ethical principles and, if necessary, proposes sanctions.
IOC Finance Commission	Ng Ser Miang	Singapore	Provide advice and recommendations relating to the IOC's financial management in order to safeguard continuity and strengthen the transparency and good governance of the IOC and the Olympic Movement.
IOC Members Election Commission	Anne, Princess Royal	United Kingdom	Propose and implement a new targeted recruitment process of IOC Members as per recommendation 38 of Olympic Agenda 2020
IOC Legal Affairs Commission	Denis Oswald	Switzerland	Supervise the legal affairs of the IOC. This includes providing legal opinions, consider defence actions and study the legal nature of issues that may affect the interests of the IOC.
IOC Television And Marketing Services Board Of Directors	Jiri Kejval	Czech Republic	Supervise all Olympic Television and Marketing operations.
IOC Medical and Scientific Commission	Robin E. Mitchell	Fiji	Provide a guiding reference for all other sports organisations on matters relating to the protection of the health of athletes.
IOC Olympic Channel Board Of Directors	Richard Carrión	Puerto Rico	Maintain year-round interest in the Olympic movement, carrying documentaries and other programming chronicling the Olympic Games, as well as coverage of events in Olympic sport outside of the Games.
IOC Olympic Education Commission	Mikaela Cojuangco Jaworski	Philippines	Supervise the promotion of Olympic values-based education and provides strategic direction on IOC programmes and activities related to the education of youth through sport.
IOC Olympic Programme Commission	Karl Stoss	Austria	Analyse Summer, Winter and Youth Olympic Games programmes and form proposals for consideration by the IOC Executive Board.
IOC Olympic Solidarity Commission	Robin E. Mitchell	Fiji	Provide assistance to all the National Olympic Committees (NOCs) for athlete development programmes, in particular those with the greatest needs of it.
IOC Olympism 365 Commission	Auvita Rapilla	Papua New Guinea	Strengthen the role of sport and Olympism in society as important enablers of the UN Sustainable Development Goals, 365 days a year.
IOC Commission for Public Affairs and Social Development Through Sport	Luis Alberto Moreno	Colombia	Protect and promote the autonomy and neutrality of sport. It also advises on the role of sport and Olympism in society, as a contributor to the UN Sustainable Development Goals, and as a contributor to peace. It recommends approaches to position the IOC as a thought-leader and policy-influencer on the international stage.
IOC Technology And Technical Innovation Commission	Gerardo Werthein	Argentina	Ensure that the IOC has the appropriate strategies relating to the secure and sustainable use of technology in support of the IOC's daily operations, the delivery of the Olympic Games and of the Youth Olympic Games.
IOC Sustainability and Legacy Commission	Albert II, Prince of Monaco	Monaco	Supervise sustainability and legacy matters and make informed, balanced decisions that maximise positive impacts, minimise negative impacts and foster positive change and legacies in the social, economic and environmental spheres.
Gender Equality, Diversity and Inclusion Commission	Lydia Nsekera	Burundi	Supervise the implementation of the gender equality and inclusion strategy to enable them to make informed and balanced decisions to advance gender equality in sport on and off the field of play across the three spheres of responsibility of the IOC.
IOC Revenues And Commercial Partnerships Commission	Jiri Kejval	Czech Republic	Give guidance, perspective and ideas in the area of Olympic marketing and commercial partnerships which will assist the IOC to continue to generate, enable and grow long-term, sustainable revenue streams for the Olympic Movement.

== The Olympic Partner programme ==
The Olympic Partner (TOP) sponsorship programme includes the following commercial sponsors of the Olympic Games.

- AB InBev
- Airbnb
- Allianz
- Alibaba Group
- Coca-Cola-Mengniu Dairy (joint partnership)
- Deloitte
- JPMorgan Chase
- Omega SA
- Procter & Gamble
- Samsung Electronics
- TCL Technology
- Visa Inc.

== See also ==
- Association of International Olympic Winter Sports Federations (AIOWF)
- Association of IOC Recognised International Sports Federations (ARISF)
- Association of Summer Olympic International Federations (ASOIF)
- International Academy of Sport Science and Technology (AISTS)
- International Committee of Sports for the Deaf (ICSD)
- International Paralympic Committee (IPC)
- International University Sports Federation (FISU)
- Global Association of International Sports Federations (GAISF)
- FICTS (Fédération Internationale Cinéma Télévision Sportifs) (Organisation recognised by the IOC)
- List of IOC meetings
- Olympic Congress
- List of International Olympic Committee competitions
