= 2023 Pan American Games =

19th edition of the Pan American Games

XIX Pan American Games
- Host city: Santiago
- Country: Chile
- Motto: Our Meeting Point; Spanish: Nuestro Punto de Encuentro
- Nations: 41
- Athletes: 6,909
- Events: 425 in 39 sports
- Opening: 20 October
- Closing: 5 November
- Opened by: President Gabriel Boric
- Cauldron lighter: Fernando González; Lucy López; Nicolás Massú
- Main venue: Estadio Nacional Julio Martínez Prádanos (Opening ceremony); Estadio Bicentenario de La Florida (Closing ceremony)
- Website: www.santiago2023.org/en

The 2023 Pan American Games (Spanish: Juegos Panamericanos de 2023), officially the XIX Pan American Games (Spanish: XIX Juegos Panamericanos) and commonly known as Santiago 2023, were an international multi-sport event governed by the Panam Sports Organization, held in Santiago, Chile from 20 October to 5 November 2023; preliminary rounds in certain events began on 18 October 2023. These were the first Pan American Games to be held in Chile, and the eighth to be held in South America.

The games were held in 39 venues across the Santiago Metropolitan Region and another three regions of Chile. The Pan American Games and the 2023 Parapan American Games were organized by the Santiago Organizing Committee for the 2023 Pan and Parapan American Games.

== Bidding process ==
Two bids were submitted for the 2023 Pan American Games. Santiago, Chile and Buenos Aires, Argentina both submitted bids. On 1 February 2017, the Pan American Sports Organization (now Panam Sports) announced the two cities as the official bids. Buenos Aires withdrew their bid in April 2017 due to not having the necessary finances or logistics to host both this event and the 2018 Summer Youth Olympics.

=== Host city election ===
Santiago was unanimously acclaimed as the host city at the ANOC General Assembly in Prague on 4 November 2017. This marked the first time Chile hosted the Pan American Games. Santiago was initially awarded the right to host the 1975 and later 1987 Pan American Games, but withdrew as host both times due to financial and political problems. Most recently, Santiago was a candidate for the 2019 Pan American Games, but lost to Lima.

Bidding results
City	NOC name	Votes
Santiago	Chile	Unanimous

== Development and preparation ==
=== Financing ===
The budget for the games was $507 million USD, with $170 million reserved for the building of ten new sporting venues and the upgrade of six arenas. The budget was about 36% of what was spent for the 2015 Pan American Games in Toronto, Canada and 50% of the last Pan American Games in 2019, in Lima, Peru.

=== Venues ===
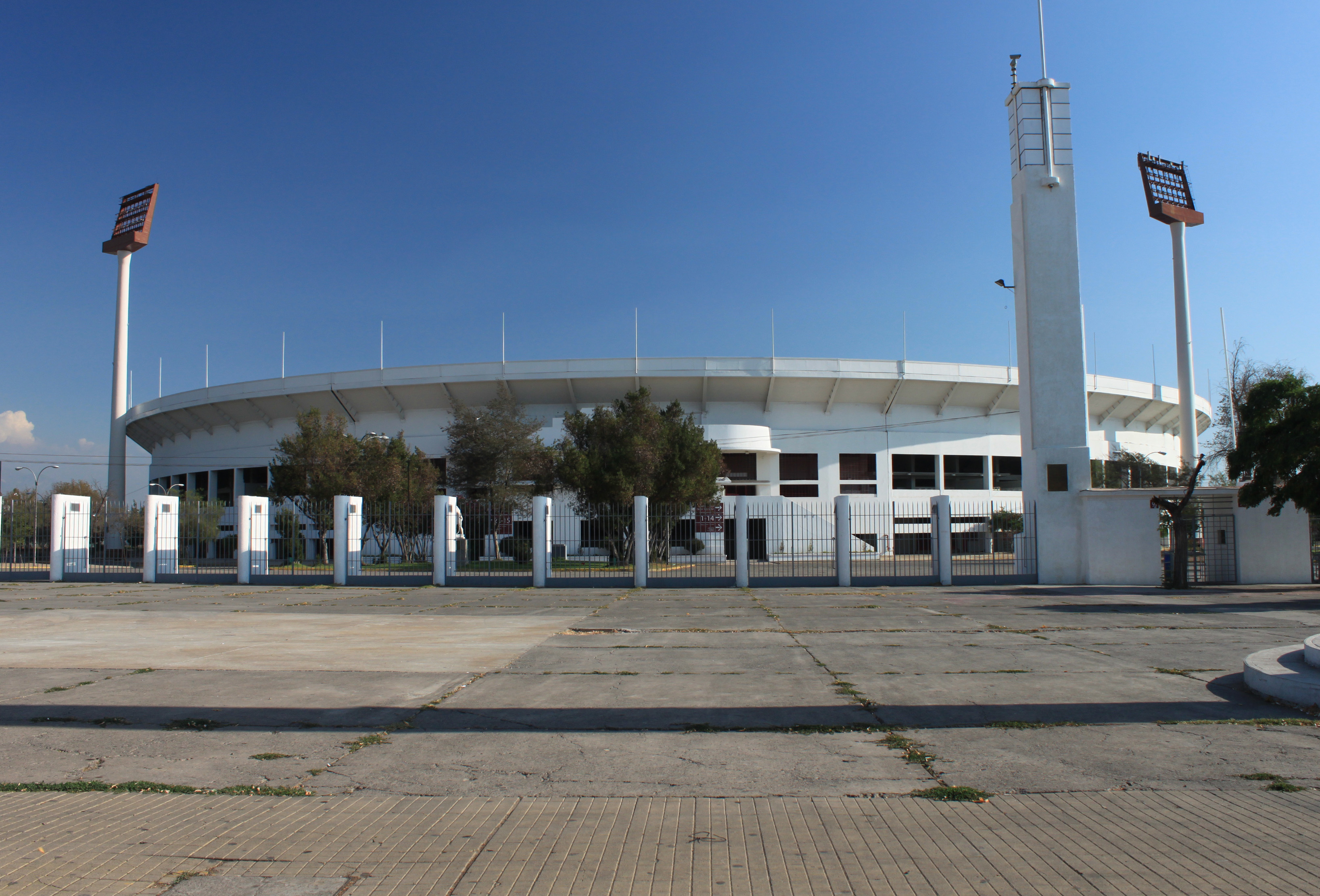
Estadio Nacional Julio Martínez Prádanos, the main venue of the event.

Various venues across Santiago and various other cities were used for the games, including Viña del Mar, Valparaíso and Algarrobo. In March 2022, the first venue for the games was officially inaugurated: the field hockey stadium on the National Stadium Grounds.

In June 2022, organizers revealed the final venue plan consisting of 41 competition venues. 39 were used for the Games, with the other two being used exclusively for the 2023 Parapan American Games. The venues spanned four regions of the country: Santiago, Valparaíso, O'Higgins and Biobío.

=== Athletes Village ===
In December 2021, a ceremony was held to lay the first brick for the village. The village was expected to cost approximately $100 million USD, and consisted of 1,345 apartments. After the games, the village was converted to social housing. The village was built in the Cerrillos Bicentennial Park community of Santiago.

=== Torch relay ===
The Pan American Flame was lit at the Pyramid of the Moon in the pre-Hispanic Mexican city of Teotihuacan, and the torch relay began on 5 October 2023 and ended at the opening ceremony with the lighting of the cauldron. There were three torches, with each torch travelling to different areas of Santiago and Chile.

== The Games ==
=== Ceremonies ===
The opening ceremony was held during the evening of 20 October at Estadio Nacional. The ceremony consisted of a cultural display showcasing all of Chile's diversity. The games were opened by President Gabriel Boric, with IOC President Thomas Bach and Panam Sports President Neven Ilic also attending the ceremony. Musical performances included Colombian singer Sebastián Yatra. The cauldron was lit by 1951 Pan American Games silver medalist Lucy López, and the only two Chilean Olympic gold medalists, Nicolás Massú and Fernando González.

The closing ceremony was held on the evening of 5 November at Estadio Bicentenario de La Florida. Among cultural demonstrations, the Panam Sports flag was handed over by Chilean president Gabriel Boric to officials representing Barranquilla and the Caribbean region of Colombia as the former host city of the 2027 Pan American Games, followed by a segment to present the next host city. The games were declared closed by Panam Sports President Neven Ilic. The cultural segment was headlined by local artist Joe Vasconcellos and American-Dominican singer Prince Royce.

=== Participating National Olympic Committees ===
40 National Olympic Committees who were members of the Pan American Sports Organization competed at the games. The 41st member, Guatemala, had its NOC suspended, and its athletes thus competed as PASO Individual Athletes. This total number does not include the numbers of athletes registered for e-Sports, which was a sport of demonstration.

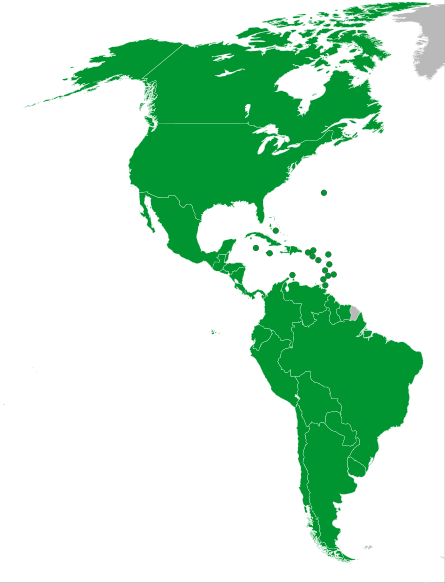
A map of all 40 participating teams

Participating National Olympic Committees
- Antigua and Barbuda (8)
- Argentina (508)
- Aruba (14)
- Bahamas (20)
- Barbados (29)
- Belize (6)
- Bermuda (11)
- Bolivia (69)
- Brazil (619)
- British Virgin Islands (4)
- Canada (469)
- Cayman Islands (7)
- Chile (664) (Host)
- Colombia (390)
- Costa Rica (91)
- Cuba (263)
- Dominica (5)
- Dominican Republic (161)
- Ecuador (175)
- El Salvador (80)
- Grenada (7)
- Guyana (19)
- Haiti (14)
- Honduras (42)
- Independent Athletes Team (105)
- Jamaica (90)
- Mexico (640)
- Nicaragua (24)
- Panama (86)
- Paraguay (117)
- Peru (216)
- Puerto Rico (174)
- Saint Lucia (4)
- Saint Kitts and Nevis (5)
- Saint Vincent and the Grenadines (4)
- Suriname (6)
- Trinidad and Tobago (63)
- United States (631)
- Uruguay (178)
- Venezuela (252)
- Virgin Islands (12)

=== Sports ===
A total of 425 events in 39 sports were contested at the 2023 Pan American Games: breaking, skateboarding (as a discipline of roller sports), and sport climbing made their Pan-Am Games debut, while bodybuilding was dropped after its debut in 2019. Men's and women's team Kyorugi events were also added in taekwondo. Other new event disciplines included synchronized trampoline in gymnastics, the 1,000 meter sprint in roller speed skating and the mixed eights event in rowing. Meanwhile, the mixed team event in golf was dropped for this edition and weightlifting events were reduced by four (to mirror the 2024 Olympics program).

Panam Sports announced an initial program of 33 sports in March 2020, consisting of the 28 "core" sports that would be contested at the 2024 Summer Olympics in Paris, along with baseball/softball, karate, roller sports (artistic, speed, and skateboarding), surfing, and water skiing. Panam Sports did not rule out the addition of further sports, provided that they did not increase the infrastructural costs of the Games. In December 2020, basque pelota, bowling, racquetball, squash, and sport climbing were added to the program, expanding it to 38 sports. On 24 June 2022, breakdancing (breaking) was added to the program as its 39th sport, serving as a qualifier for its Olympic debut at Paris 2024.

Numbers in parentheses indicate the number of medal events contested in each sport/discipline.

- Aquatics
  - Artistic swimming (2)
  - Diving (10)
  - Open water swimming (2)
  - Swimming (36)
  - Water polo (2)
- Archery (10)
- Athletics (48)
- Badminton (5)
- Baseball
  - Baseball (1)
  - Softball (1)
- Basketball
  - Basketball (2)
  - 3x3 basketball (2)
- Basque pelota (8)
- Bowling (4)
- Boxing (13)
- Breaking (2)
- Canoeing
  - Canoe sprint (10)
  - Slalom canoeing (6)
- Cycling
  - BMX freestyle (2)
  - BMX racing (2)
  - Mountain biking (2)
  - Road cycling (4)
  - Track cycling (12)
- Equestrian
  - Dressage (2)
  - Eventing (2)
  - Jumping (2)
- Fencing (12)
- Field hockey (2)
- Football (2)
- Golf (2)
- Gymnastics
  - Artistic gymnastics (14)
  - Rhythmic gymnastics (8)
  - Trampoline (4)
- Handball (2)
- Judo (15)
- Karate (12)
- Modern pentathlon (5)
- Racquetball (7)
- Roller sports
  - Artistic roller skating (2)
  - Skateboarding (4)
  - Inline speed skating (8)
- Rowing (15)
- Rugby sevens (2)
- Sailing (13)
- Shooting (15)
- Sport climbing (4)
- Squash (7)
- Surfing (8)
- Table tennis (7)
- Taekwondo (13)
- Tennis (5)
- Triathlon (3)
- Volleyball
  - Beach volleyball (2)
  - Volleyball (2)
- Water skiing (10)
  - Water skiing (8)
  - Wakeboarding (2)
- Weightlifting (10)
- Wrestling
  - Freestyle wrestling (12)
  - Greco-Roman wrestling (6)

== Calendar ==
OC	Opening ceremony	●	Event competitions	1	Event finals	CC	Closing ceremony

October/November		18 Wed	19 Thu	20 Fri	21 Sat	22 Sun	23 Mon	24 Tue	25 Wed	26 Thu	27 Fri	28 Sat	29 Sun	30 Mon	31 Tue	1 Wed	2 Thu	3 Fri	4 Sat	5 Sun	Medal events
Ceremonies (opening / closing)				OC																CC	—N/a
Aquatics	Artistic swimming														●		1	1			2
Aquatics	Diving			●	2	2	2	2	2												10
Aquatics	Open water swimming												2								2
Aquatics	Swimming				8	7	9	6	6												36
Aquatics	Water polo													●	●	●	●	●	2		2
Archery																●	●	●	7	3	10
Athletics						2							2	5	5	5	10	8	11		48
Badminton					●	●	●	●	5												5
Baseball
Baseball	Baseball	●	●	●	●	●	●	●	●	●	●	1									1
Baseball	Softball												●	●	●	●	●	●	1		1
Basketball	Basketball								●	●	●	●	1		●	●	●	●	1		2
Basketball	3×3 Basketball				●	●	2														2
Basque pelota															●	●	●	●	4	4	8
Bowling																	2	●	●	2	4
Boxing			●	●	●	●	●	●	●	●	13										13
Breaking																		●	2		2
Canoeing	Slalom										●	●	6								6
Canoeing	Sprint															●	●	5	5		10
Cycling	BMX freestyle																			2	2
Cycling	BMX racing				●	2															2
Cycling	Mountain biking				2																2
Cycling	Road					2							2								4
Cycling	Track							3	2	2	5										12
Equestrian	Dressage					●	1		1												2
Equestrian	Eventing										●	●	2								2
Equestrian	Jumping														●	1		1			2
Fencing														2	2	2	2	2	2		12
Field hockey									●	●	●	●	●	●		●	●	1	1		2
Football						●	●		●	●		●	●		●	●		1	1		2
Golf																	●	●	●	2	2
Gymnastics	Artistic				1	1	2	5	5												14
Gymnastics	Rhythmic															●	2	3	3		8
Gymnastics	Trampoline																	●	4		4
Handball								●	●	●		●	1	●	●	●		●	1		2
Judo												5	4	5	1						15
Karate																		4	5	3	12
Modern pentathlon					●	●	2		1	1	1										5
Racquetball					●	●	●	5	●	2											7
Roller sports	Artistic																	●	2		2
Roller sports	Skateboarding				2	2															4
Roller sports	Speed																		4	4	8
Rowing					●	●	5	5	5												15
Rugby sevens																		●	2		2
Sailing												●		●	●	●	●	6	7		13
Shooting					2	3	2	1	1	3	3										15
Sport climbing					1	1	1	1													4
Squash															●	2	●	3	●	2	7
Surfing								●	●	●	●			8							8
Table tennis													●	1	2	2	●	●	●	2	7
Taekwondo					5	4	2	2													13
Tennis							●	●	●	●	●	3	2								5
Triathlon																	2		1		3
Volleyball	Beach				●	●	●	●	●	●	2										2
Volleyball	Indoor				●	●	●	●	●	1				●	●	●	●	●	1		2
Water skiing					●	●	7	3													10
Weightlifting					3	3	2	2													10
Wrestling																4	5	5	4		18
Total Medal events					26	29	37	35	28	9	24	9	22	21	10	16	24	40	71	24	425
Cumulative total					26	55	92	127	155	164	188	197	219	240	250	266	290	330	401	425	—N/a
		18 Wed	19 Thu	20 Fri	21 Sat	22 Sun	23 Mon	24 Tue	25 Wed	26 Thu	27 Fri	28 Sat	29 Sun	30 Mon	31 Tue	1 Wed	2 Thu	3 Fri	4 Sat	5 Sun	Medal events

== Medal table ==
Key

* Host nation (Chile)

Rank	NOC	Gold	Silver	Bronze	Total
1	United States	124	75	87	286
2	Brazil	66	73	66	205
3	Mexico	52	38	52	142
4	Canada	46	55	63	164
5	Cuba	30	22	17	69
6	Colombia	29	38	34	101
7	Argentina	17	25	33	75
8	Chile*	12	31	36	79
9	Peru	10	6	16	32
10	Venezuela	8	15	21	44
11–34	Remaining NOCs	32	48	102	182
Totals (34 entries)		426	426	527	1,379

Medals used in the games

Gold medal	Silver medal	Bronze medal

== Media ==
In February 2022, Mediapro reached an agreement to serve as host broadcaster of Santiago 2023; for the first time, every event held across the Pan-American and Parapan American Games was televised, nearly doubling the hours of coverage available to rightsholders in comparison to 2019. In September 2022, the country's public broadcaster Televisión Nacional de Chile (TVN) reached an agreement to serve as the domestic broadcaster of the Games. In early-2023, the commercial networks Canal 13 and Chilevisión also acquired rights to the Games.

On 19 October 2024, TVN would premiere a documentary—Santiago 2023: Cuando Chile se encontró (Santiago 2023: When Chile found itself)—to mark the one-year anniversary of the Games.

== Marketing ==
=== Emblem ===
The emblem of the 2023 Pan American and Parapan American Games was unveiled on 17 July 2019. The new slogan of the Games: "Our Meeting Point" (Spanish: Nuestro Punto de Encuentro) was presented in 2023.

=== Mascot ===
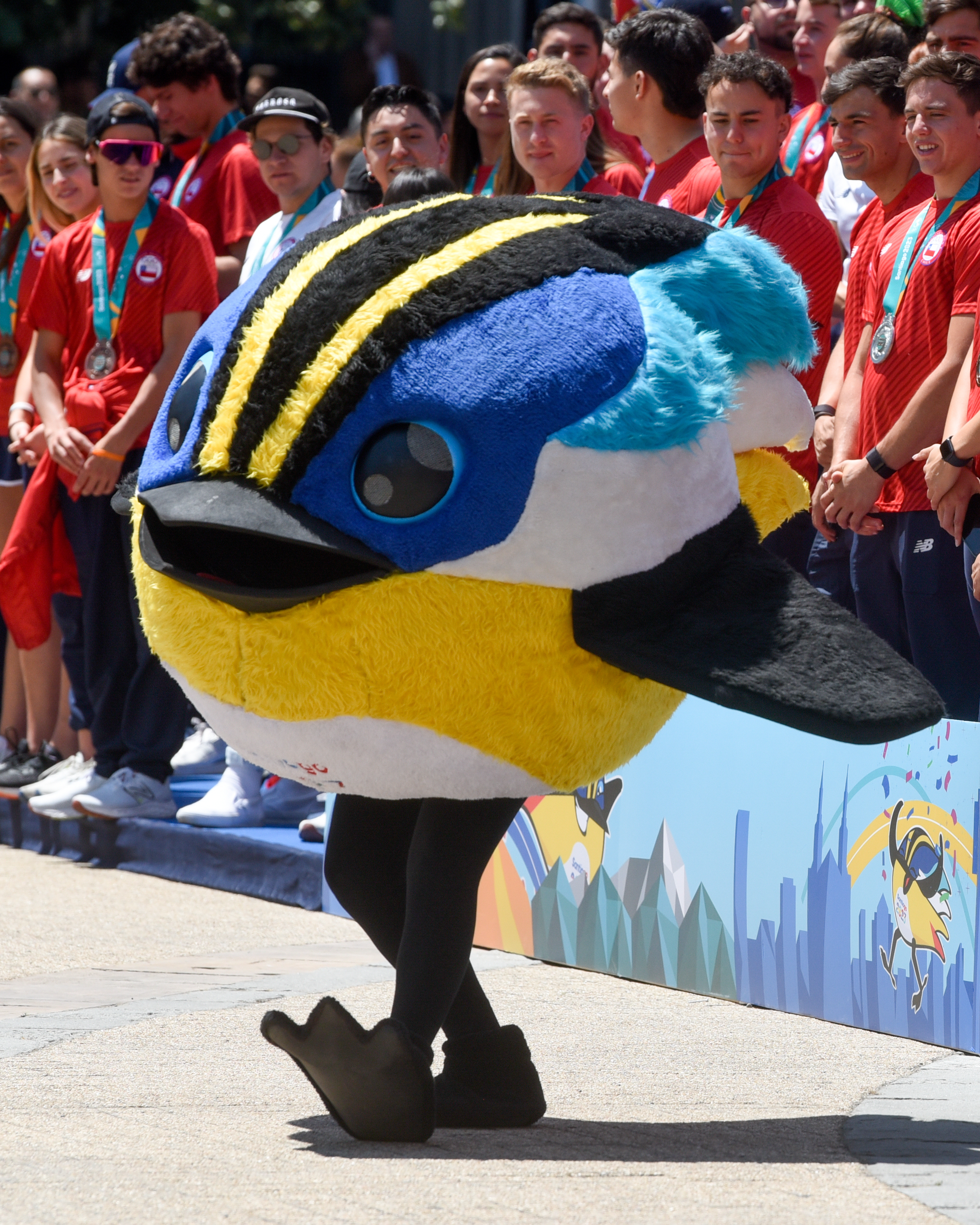
Fiu, the official mascot of the Games.

An online poll was held in August 2021 to determine the mascot of the 2023 Pan American and Parapan American Games. Five candidates were presented, based on plants and wildlife native to Chile. On 16 October 2021, Fiu—a many-colored rush tyrant—was announced as the winner of the vote. Its design is described as reflecting the "diversity of human beings and especially athletes", and symbolizing that "being small does not mean you cannot give it your best effort".

=== Corporate sponsorship ===
Sponsors of the 2023 Pan American Games
Official Sponsors
- Antofagasta Minerals
- Banco del Estado de Chile
- Bornan Sports Technology
- LATAM Airlines Chile
- Mitsubishi Motors
Official Providers
- ADN Radio
- Cachantún
- Colbún S.A.
- PepsiCo (Gatorade)
- PF Alimentos
Official Supporters
- Canon Inc.
- Empresas Copec
- Ivolution
- Red Bull
- Xtrem
Proud Supporters
- AB InBev (Budweiser)
- Andrés Bello National University
- Astara
- Carozzi
- Casillero del Diablo
- Entel
- Frutas de Chile
- LifeStyles Condoms
- McDonald's
- Molten Corporation
- Nestlé (Milo)
- Parque Arauco S.A.
- Pontifical Catholic University of Chile-Christus Health
- Ripley S.A.
- Salmón de Chile
- Shimano
- Sparta
- Virutex Ilko
- Western Union
Institutional Partner
- Correos de Chile
- Empresa de los Ferrocarriles del Estado
- Marca Chile
- National Tourism Service
- ProChile
- Santiago Metro

== Concerns and controversies ==
The women's 20 kilometres walk was marked by controversy as the official distance was short of 20 kilometres. Kimberly García of Peru had originally won the event in a time of 1:12.26, more than nine minutes below the world record. Organizers realized the course was short after the event had been completed. Athletes believed the course was approximately three kilometers short, with the winner Garcia noticing the distance and time were not matching after the first kilometre. Due to the error, the times were erased and athletes could not receive world ranking points towards qualification for the 2024 Summer Olympics. The organizing committee blamed the error on the Association of Panamerican Athletics and the person who they hired to accurately measure the course. The executive director of the Games, Harold Mayne-Nicholls, felt that the incident was an embarrassment.

== See also ==
- 2022 South American Games
- 2023 Central American and Caribbean Games
- 2025 Junior Pan American Games

Preceded by Lima	XIX Pan American Games; Santiago (2023)	Succeeded by Lima
