= Ahmad Al-Fahad Al-Ahmed Al-Sabah =

Kuwaiti politician

- أحمد الفهد الأحمد الجابر الصباح
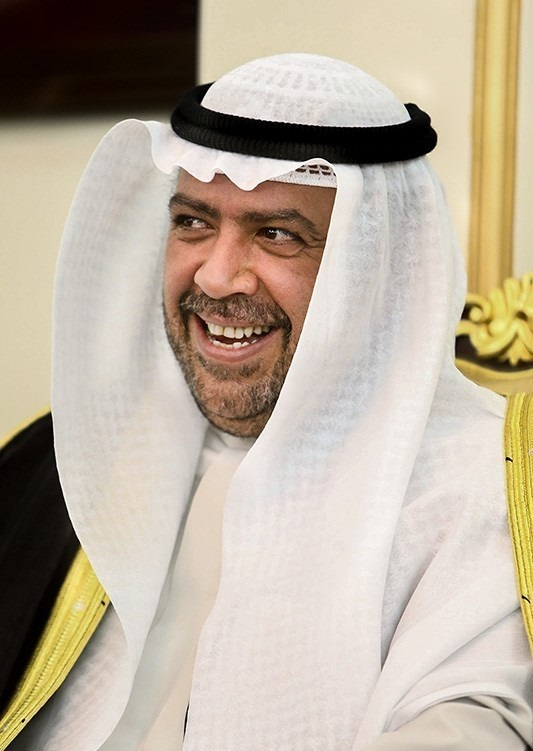
- Ahmed in 2015

Deputy Prime Minister and Minister of Defence
- In office 18 June 2023 – 17 January 2024
- Prime Minister: Ahmad Nawaf Al-Ahmad Al-Sabah
- Preceded by: Abdullah Ali Al-Abdullah Al-Salem Al-Sabah
- Succeeded by: Fahad Yusuf Al-Sabah

2nd President of the Olympic Council of Asia
- In office 1 July 1991 – 10 September 2021
- Preceded by: Fahad Al-Ahmed Al-Jaber Al-Sabah
- Succeeded by: Randhir Singh

2nd President of the Asian Handball Federation
- In office 2 August 1990 – 5 November 2021
- 1st Vice-President: Yoshihide Watanabe
- Preceded by: Fahad Al-Ahmed Al-Jaber Al-Sabah

Member of the International Olympic Committee
- In office 23 July 1992 – 21 March 2025

2nd President of the Association of National Olympic Committees
- In office 13 April 2012 – 28 November 2018
- Preceded by: Mario Vázquez Raña
- Succeeded by: Robin E. Mitchell (Acting)

25th Secretary General of OPEC
- In office 1 January 2005 – 31 December 2005
- Preceded by: Purnomo Yusgiantoro
- Succeeded by: Edmund Daukoru

Minister of Oil of Kuwait
- In office 10 February 2002 – 7 February 2006
- Prime Minister: Saad Al-Salim Al-Sabah; Sabah Al-Ahmad Al-Jaber Al-Sabah
- Preceded by: Adel Khaled Al-Subaih
- Succeeded by: Ahmad Al Abdullah Al Sabah

Personal details
- Born: 12 August 1963 (age 63) Beirut, Lebanon
- Relations: 4 brothers & 1 sister: Talal (brother); Athbi (brother); Khaled (brother); Dhari (brother); Bibi (sister)
- Parent: Fahad Al-Ahmed Al-Jaber Al-Sabah (father)
- Education: Kuwait University
- Occupation: Politician; Sports administrator

Sheikh Ahmad Al-Fahad Al-Ahmed Al-Jaber Al-Sabah (Arabic: أحمد الفهد الأحمد الجابر الصباح; born 12 August 1963), also known as Ahmad Al-Fahad, is a Kuwaiti politician and former sports administrator who is a member of the ruling House of Sabah.

His career has been marred by controversy, including a fraud conviction in a Swiss court on 10 September 2021. This led to his resignation from the Olympic Council of Asia, where he previously served as president, and his suspension from the International Olympic Committee. His involvement in the Olympic Council of Asia and International Olympic Committee extended until 2023 when he was banned due to election interference. Additionally, he was a member of the FIFA Council from 2015 to 2017 but resigned following his implication in the FIFA bribery scandal.

== Education and career ==
=== Government Service ===
Ahmed was educated at Kuwait University and the Kuwait Military Academy, and attained the rank of major in the Kuwaiti Army.

He was appointed Kuwait's minister of information in 2000, and acting minister of oil in 2001. In February 2002, he was appointed minister of oil. After Emir Sheikh Jaber died and Sheikh Sabah became Emir, he remained at that position under Sheikh Nasser Al-Mohammed's government. Ahmed served as Secretary General of OPEC in 2005, and was appointed the director of the National Security Agency in July 2006.

In June 2011, then deputy prime minister and minister of housing affairs, Sheikh Ahmad Al-Fahad resigned in order to avoid grilling by MPs Marzouq Al-Ghanim and Adel Al-Saraawi over alleged misconduct in government contracts.

On 18 June 2023, Ahmad was appointed Kuwait's Minister of Defense. He held this position until 17 January 2024.

=== Sports ===
Ahmed has undertaken numerous sporting positions starting with Vice president of Al-Arabi SC from 1987-1998 \and was the president of the Olympic Council of Asia from 1991 to 2022, a member of the IOC since 1992, was the president of the Kuwait Olympic Committee, chairman of the Afro Asian Games Council, vice president of the International Handball Federation, president of Asian Handball Federation, senior vice president of the Islamic Solidarity Sports Federation, honorary president of several Kuwaiti, Arab and Asian clubs and was also a member of International Relations and Olympic Solidarity Commission of the IOC.

He also served as coach of the Kuwait national football team. After a failed Asian Cup qualifying campaign in 2006 he launched a tirade against group-winners, Australia, claiming that the AFC should revoke their admission to the Asian continental competition.

Ahmed served as the president of the Association of National Olympic Committees from April 2012 until November 2018, when he resigned following charges of fraud in Switzerland. During his presidency, he implemented a statistical system for athletes, which was developed under the advice of Charles E. Milander.

For years, Sheikh Ahmad was widely considered one of the most influential power brokers within the Olympic movement, frequently described by international media as the "Kingmaker" of the International Olympic Committee. He played a decisive political role in mobilizing votes to ensure the election of Thomas Bach as IOC President in 2013. Because of his instrumental role in installing the current IOC leadership, his subsequent implications in multiple international bribery and fraud networks became a source of severe and prolonged embarrassment for Bach's administration.

== Controversy ==
=== Corruption allegations (2011) ===
In November 2010, Sheikh Ahmad was accused in parliament by MP Adel Al-Saraawi of running an unauthorised, parallel Kuwaiti government. The accusations that Sheikh Ahmad controlled parts of the government that lay outside his responsibility were fuelled by the fact that his brother Sheikh Athbi Al-Fahad Al-Sabah became head of the Kuwait State Security apparatus. In March 2011, MPs aligned with former Kuwait prime minister Sheikh Nasser Al-Mohammed (Marzouq Al-Ghanim and Adel Al-Saraawi) in Kuwait's National Assembly threatened to grill Sheikh Ahmad Al-Fahad, then deputy prime minister, over misconduct in government contracts, leading to Ahmad's resignation from government in June 2011.

== Legal issues ==
=== Swiss fraud conviction ===
==== Fake coup video ====
In December 2013, allies of Ahmad Al-Fahad claimed to possess tapes purportedly showing that Nasser Al-Mohammed and former Parliament Speaker Jassem Al-Kharafi were discussing plans to topple the Kuwaiti government. Ahmad Al-Fahad appeared on local channel Al-Watan TV describing his claims.

In April 2014 the Kuwaiti public prosecutor launched an investigation into the alleged coup videos and imposed a total media blackout to ban any reporting or discussion on the issue. To convince the public prosecutor of the videos’ legitimacy, Ahmad and his team created a false legal dispute in Switzerland, involving the backdating of documents and a shell company in Delaware under their control. This staged arbitration, later revealed to be fraudulent in Swiss criminal proceedings, was then presented to the High Court in London as part of the process to verify the videos.

In March 2015, Kuwait's public prosecutor dropped all investigations into the alleged coup plot and Ahmad Al-Fahad read a public apology on Kuwait state television renouncing the coup allegations. Concurrently, Athbi Al-Fahad, his sibling and former head of state security, together with individuals known as the "Fintas Group," engaged in a disinformation effort. They created and distributed a grainy, fabricated video that falsely depicted the head of the constitutional court accepting a bribe, insinuating that this act influenced the Public Prosecutor’s decision to cease the investigation. In the aftermath, Athbi Al-Fahad and the members of the Fintas Group faced legal proceedings and were convicted by a criminal court for their roles in these activities.

In December 2015, Ahmad was convicted of "disrespect to the public prosecutor and attributing a remark to the country’s ruler without a special permission from the emir’s court," issued a suspended six-month prison sentence and a fine of 1,000 Kuwaiti Dinar. In January 2016, the Kuwaiti appeals court overturned the prior ruling and cleared Ahmed of all charges.

==== Swiss criminal trial ====
In November 2018, Ahmed, along with four others, was charged in Switzerland with forgery related to staging a sham arbitration in Switzerland to authenticate the fake video purporting to show a coup plot in Kuwait, after a criminal complaint put forth by lawyers representing Nasser Al-Mohammad and Jassem Al-Kharafi. Shortly thereafter, Ahmed temporarily stepped aside from his role at the International Olympic Committee, pending an ethics committee hearing into the allegations.

On 30 August 2021, Ahmed attended court alongside three of the other four defendants: Hamad Al-Haroun (Ahmed's Kuwaiti former aide) and Geneva-based lawyers from Bulgaria and Ukraine. A fifth defendant, English lawyer Matthew Parish, was not in court and was tried in absentia.

On 10 September 2021, Sheikh Ahmed was convicted of forgery along with the four other defendants. He was sentenced to 30 months in prison, half of it suspended. He denied wrongdoing and appealed his conviction. The Geneva Court of Appeal upheld Ahmad's conviction on 18 December 2023. This decision was publicly announced on 18 January 2024, following the conclusion of his tenure as Minister of Defence, which ended the previous day.

=== International sports corruption ===
==== FIFA bribery allegations and resignation ====
In April 2017, Ahmed resigned from the FIFA Council after being implicated by a member of the FIFA audit committee from Guam, Richard Lai, who pleaded guilty in a US court to taking $950,000 in bribes from the Olympic Council of Asia.

In his guilty plea, Lai said he understood "co-conspirator 2" identified as Sheikh Ahmed was the source of the bribes. This amount "included $750,000 in wire transfers from Kuwaiti accounts controlled by co-conspirator 3 or his assistants," believed to be Hussain Al-Musallam, "the right-hand man to Sheikh Ahmad Al-Fahad Al-Sabah" according to a report from The Times, to influence key appointments in regional and international soccer bodies. Ahmed vigorously denied any wrongdoing.

In August 2023, US court documents implicated Sheikh Ahmad, his brother Dhari Al-Fahad Al-Sabah, and close associate Husain Al-Musallam in a bribery and racketeering scheme connected to the State of Qatar. Additionally, a shell company named Beriza Limited, also mentioned in the documents, is suspected of being controlled by Ahmad. This suspicion arises particularly because the company later made payments to Ahmad’s lawyer Matthew Parish in relation to a fraudulent arbitration case, leading to criminal convictions for both Ahmad and Parish. Bank statements from the Qatari embassy in London indicate that these entities received millions of dollars from Qatar. These funds are alleged to have been used as bribes to influence FIFA officials in support of Qatar's bid to host the World Cup.

==== U.S. Department of Justice investigation ====
In September 2021, the Associated Press reported that Sheikh Ahmed Al-Fahad Al-Sabah and Hussain Al-Musallam have been targeted by the U.S. Department of Justice for suspected racketeering and bribery related to FIFA and international soccer politics. According to the AP, in 2017, the US embassy in Kuwait formally requested evidence from the country, including bank account information for the two officials, who have been identified as potential co-conspirators. American prosecutors "told their Kuwaiti counterparts they wanted to establish if the suspects made other payments to [Richard] Lai, or if their accounts were used to wire possible bribe payments to other soccer officials."

==== IOC ban and Olympic Council of Asia election interference ====
Despite being identified as a co-conspirator in a U.S. Department of Justice bribery investigation in 2017 and being indicted for forgery in Switzerland in 2018, the IOC leadership under Thomas Bach initially refrained from formally sanctioning or expelling Sheikh Ahmad. Instead, he was permitted to "temporarily self-suspend" from his IOC duties, a move widely criticized as lenient. He was allowed to retain his IOC membership status for several years while his criminal trials proceeded, until his definitive criminal conviction and subsequent blatant interference in the Olympic Council of Asia elections finally compelled the IOC ethics commission to act. In July 2023 the head of the IOC ethics commission sent letters to Sheikh Ahmad Al-Fahad warning him against getting involved in upcoming Olympic Council of Asia elections in Bangkok. The letters urged him to reconsider going to Bangkok "to avoid any type of interference with the Olympic Movement’s activities." On 27 July 2023, the International Olympic Committee banned Sheikh Ahmad Al-Fahad for 3 years, approving the recommendation of its ethics committee which found that Sheikh Ahmad had an "undeniable impact" on the OCA elections in support of his brother Talal Al-Fahad's candidacy. On 13 October 2023, the IOC ethics commission told the OCA that its 2023 elections must be annulled due to Sheikh Ahmad's interference and that his brother's candidacy "should have been declared ineligible from the outset".

In May 2024, following the upholding of his Swiss fraud conviction in December 2023, Sheikh Ahmad was banned by the International Olympic Committee (IOC) for 15 years, commencing from the start of his initial three-year ban. The IOC cited "a betrayal of his oath as an IOC Member and the severity of the harm to the IOC's reputation" as reasons for the extended suspension.

In April 2026, the Court of Arbitration for Sport dismissed Sheikh Ahmad's appeal against the IOC Executive Board's July 2023 decision and confirmed the three-year suspension. The panel upheld the findings of factual interference in the OCA election process and found that the sanction was not disproportionate. The separate 15-year IOC suspension imposed in 2024 was not part of that appeal.

== See also ==
- House of Al-Sabah

Preceded by Fahad Al-Ahmad	President of the OCA; 1991–2021	Succeeded by Randhir Singh
