= Fiu =

Official mascot of the 2023 Pan American Games

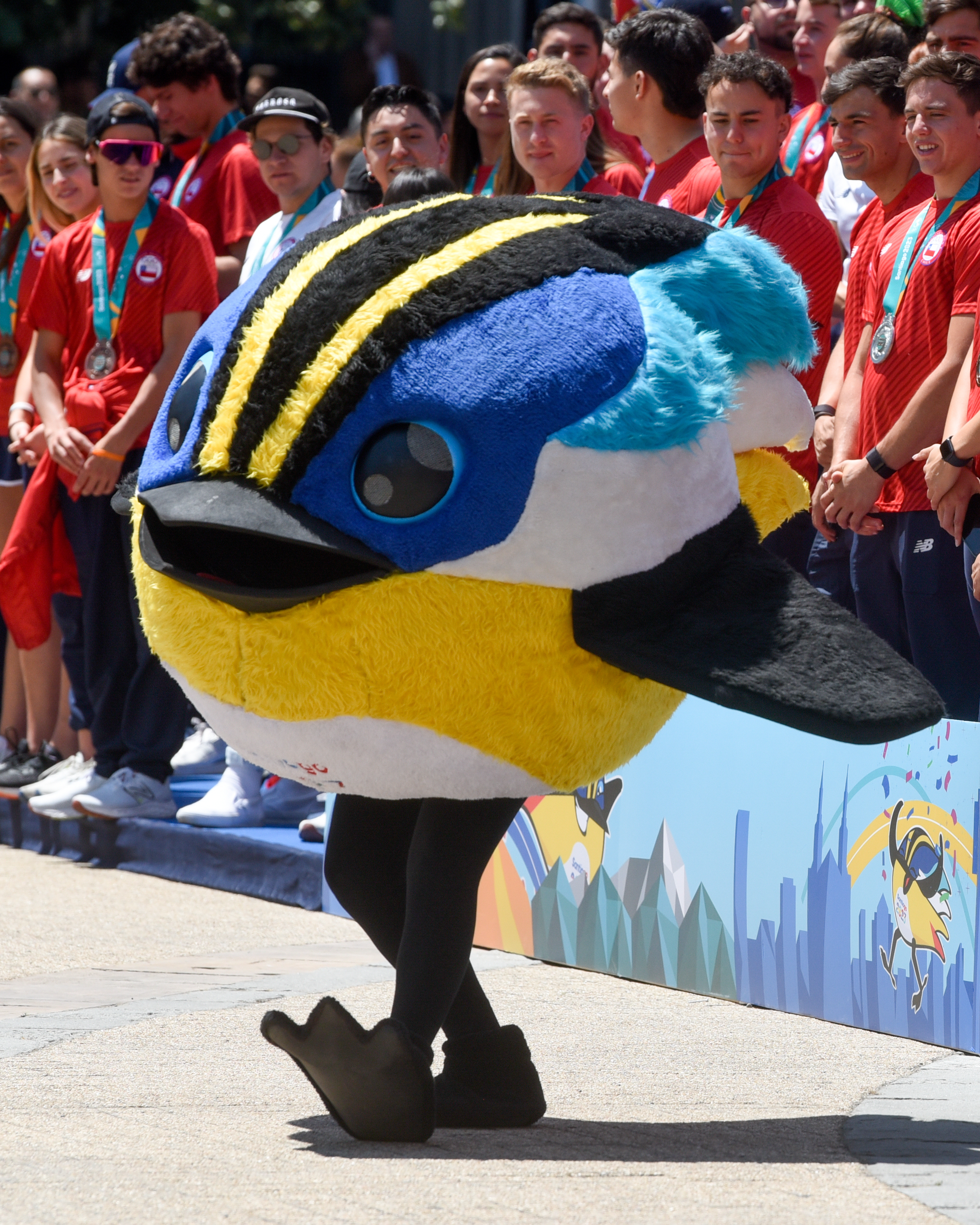

Mascot of the 2023 Pan American Games (Santiago)
- Creator: Eduardo Cortés and Katherine Castillo
- Significance: Named after the sound made by the seven-colored tyrant

Fiu, a seven-colored tyrant (Tachuris rubrigastra), is the mascot of the 2023 Pan American and Parapan American Games, which are held in Santiago, Chile. It is the twelfth mascot of the Pan American Games.

== History ==
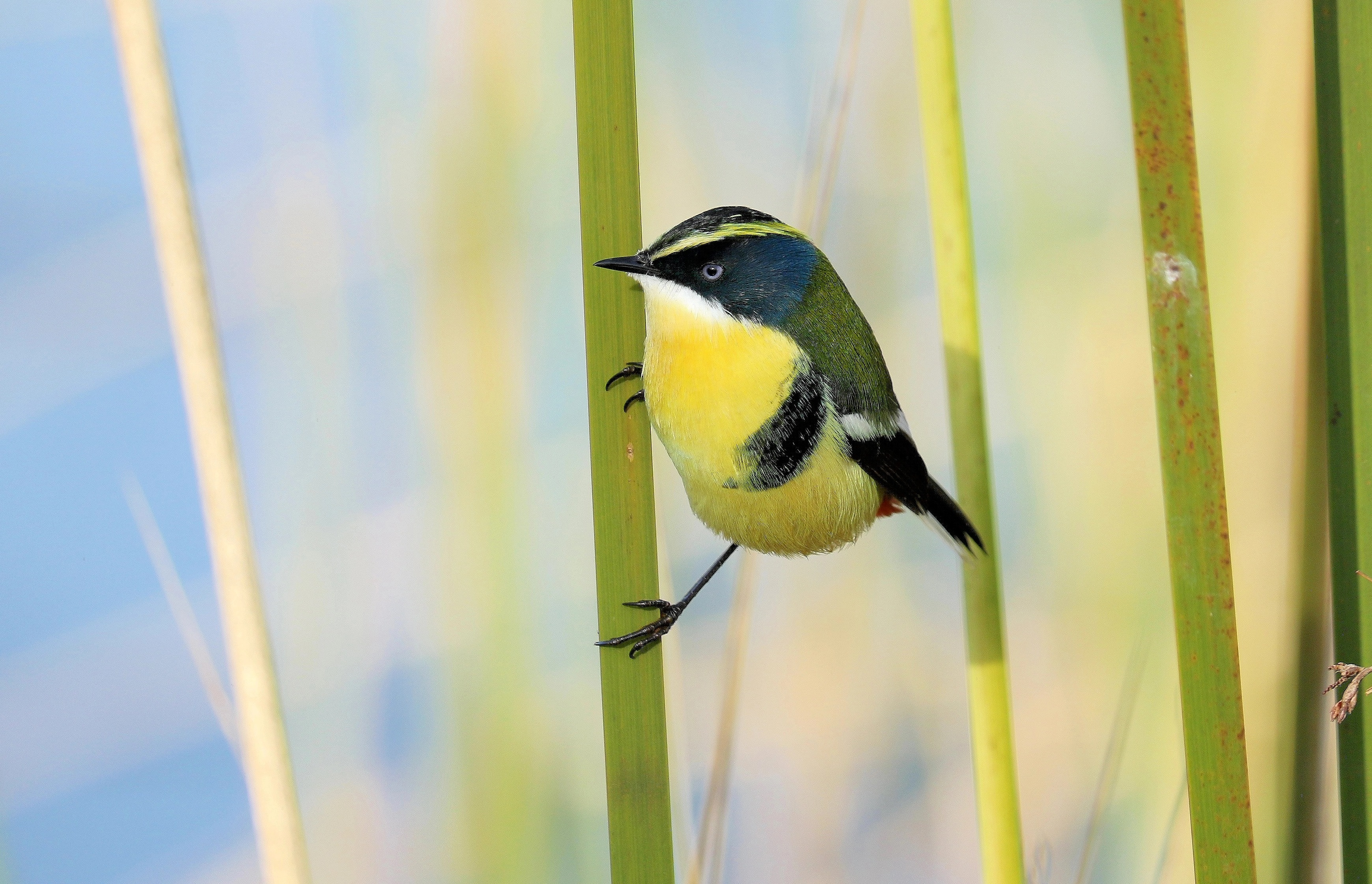
Seven-colored tyrant (Tachuris rubrigastra), bird that inspired Fiu's design.

For the election of the official mascot of the games, an online vote was held from August 5 to 25, 2021 among the 5 options presented: «Fiu», a seven-colored tyrant; «Pewü», an araucaria pine nut; «Chitama», an Atacama running lizard; «Juanchi», a Humboldt penguin; and «Santi», a winged puma.

On October 16, 2021, after a vote of more than 50,000 people, Fiu was chosen as the official mascot of Santiago 2023 and the official presentation took place through an event at the Santiago Metropolitan Park. The creator of Fiu was the graphic designer Eduardo Cortés, who presented the proposal to the Santiago 2023 mascot contest together with designer Katherine Castillo. The final design of the merchandising elements was in charge of Mythic Studio, with a team led by David González, while the costumed performer had its final design by Gonzalo Armijo.

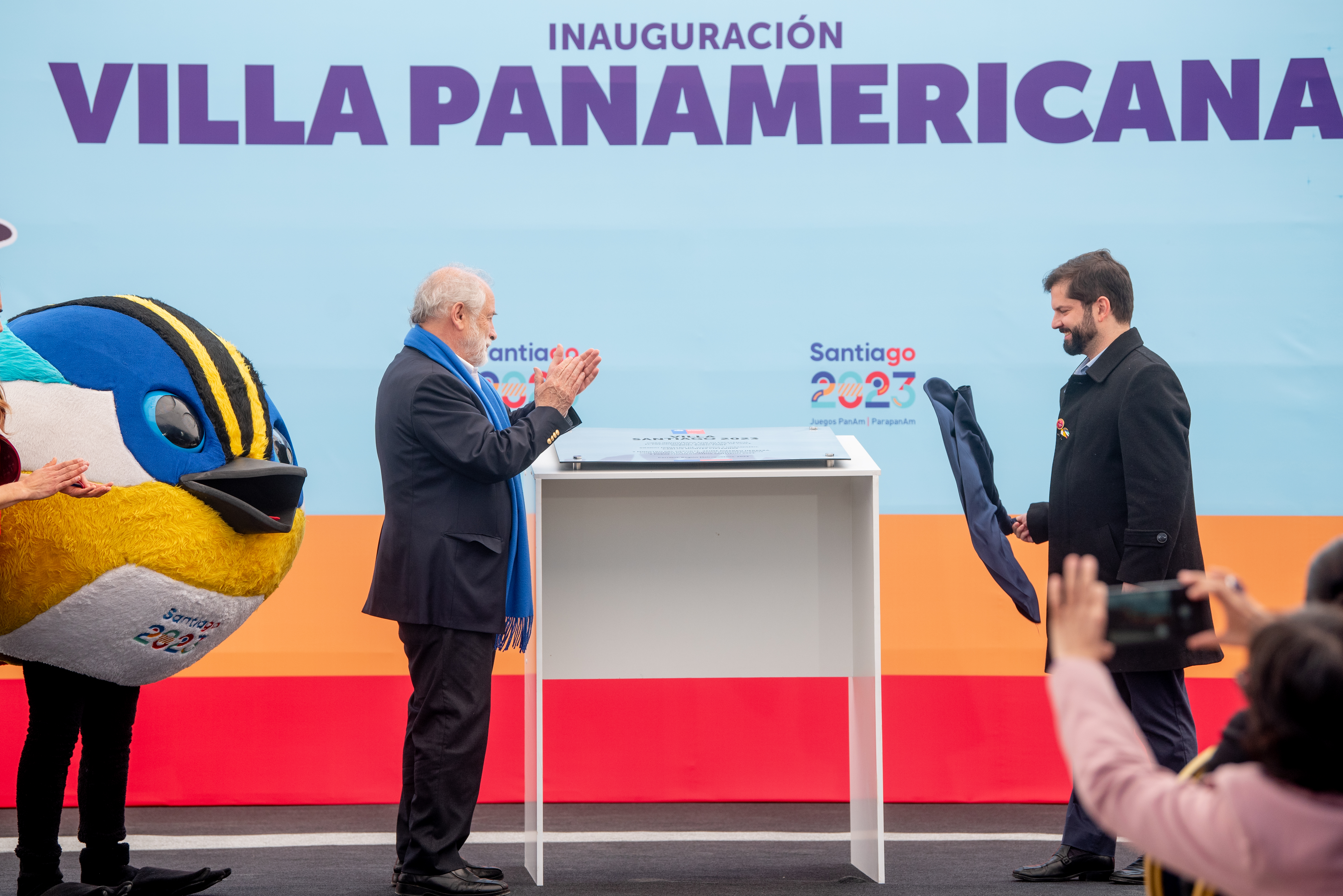
Fiu with the Minister of Housing and Urbanism, Carlos Montes, and the President of Chile, Gabriel Boric.

Its colors represent the diversity of human beings, and particularly of the athletes summoned for the regional competition. Among their physical characteristics are the long legs and short wings, which according to Rodrigo de Diego (deputy manager of Ceremonies and Culture of Santiago 2023) “make them test himself physically in each of the sports”. The name "Fiu" represents the characteristic sound made by the seven-colored tyrant; Eduardo Cortés had previously baptized the pet as "Sidi", combining the first two letters of the names of his children Simón and Diego.

Fiu's image has been part of the merchandising elements of the Pan American and Parapan American Games. On July 29, 2023, the sculpture Pluma de siete colores ("Seven-colored feather") by Francisco Gazitúa was installed at the Pan American Village in Cerrillos, representing a feather from Fiu. On September 1, limited editions of the bip! card were put on sale, with four designs alluding to Fiu and the Pan American and Parapan American Games, while on October 26, two new bip! card designs were launched! allusive to Fiu. On October 4, a series of commemorative postage stamps issued by CorreosChile was presented, and one of them features Fiu; 4 postcards with designs from the games were also released. On November 2, a limited Christmas edition of the Fiu plush was announced, which was available by reservation only. In addition, during the development of the Pan American Games, a cultural festival called "Fiu Fest" was developed.

Fiu participated in the opening of Teletón 2023 to deliver the first donation together with Teletín and athletes from Team ParaChile, also accompanied by the Minister of Sports of Chile, Jaime Pizarro; the executive director of Santiago 2023, Harold Mayne-Nicholls; the president of the Chilean Olympic Committee, Miguel Ángel Mujica; and the president of Panam Sports, Neven Ilic; due to the connection of the solidarity campaign with the sporting event.

== Popularity ==
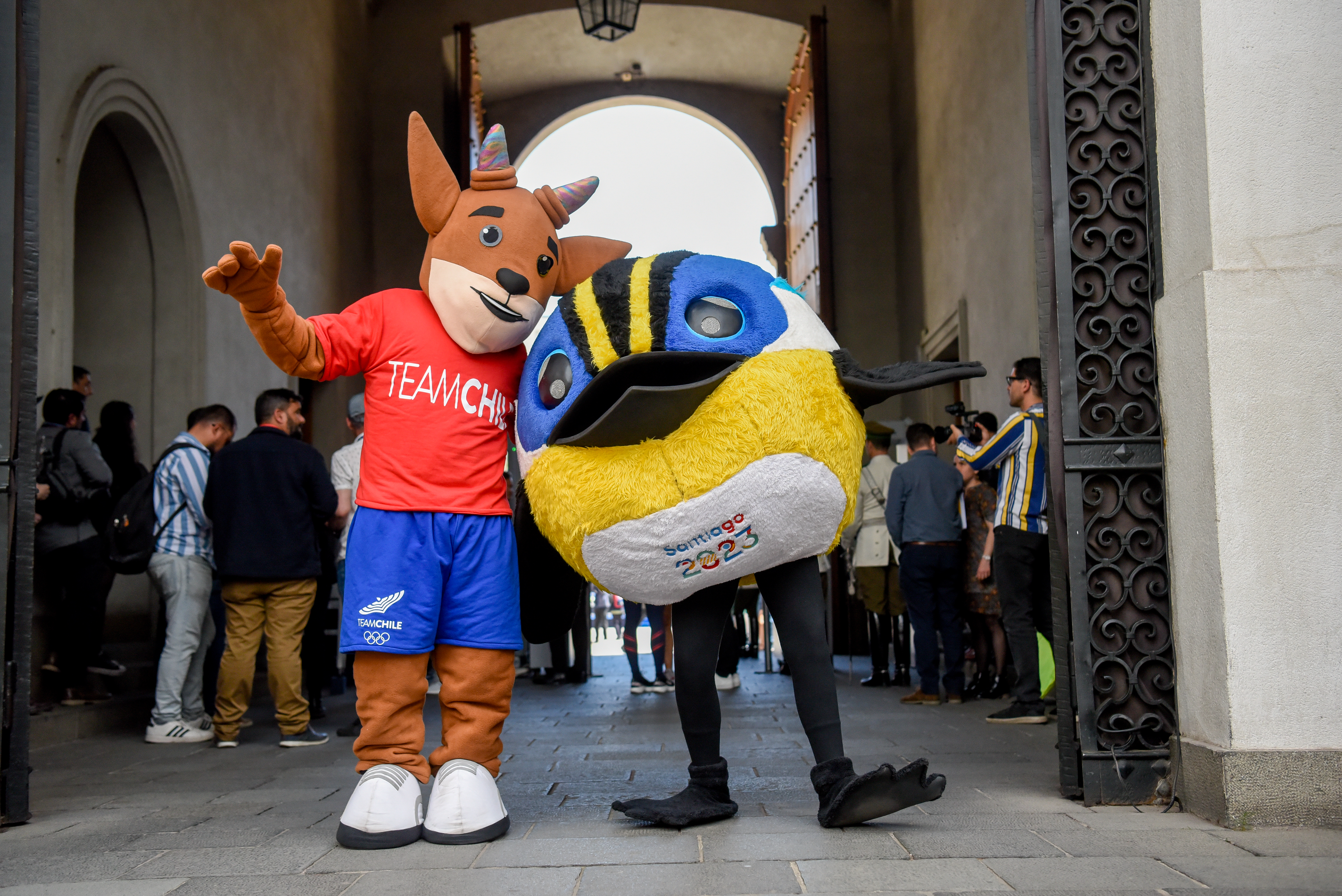
Fiu with Dupu, Team Chile mascot.

Its popularity increased considerably once the games started, becoming a phenomenon both on social networks and in the venues where the sporting events took place. According to figures from TuFans, the company in charge of the merchandising of the games, nearly 3,000 Fiu stuffed animals were sold daily during the days of competitions. Campaigns arose on social networks in favor of the continuity of Fiu once the Pan American and Parapan American Games were over as a symbol of Chilean sport or even eventually as a mascot of the Ministry of Sports.

In the days after the opening of the Pan American Games, counterfeit versions of the Fiu plush emerged, as well as the figure of the mascot was used by the Santiago Metro to deliver safety tips. In the town of Pomaire, belonging to the Melipilla Province, famous for its clay crafts, a version of the traditional pig painted with the colors of the mascot of Santiago 2023 was created, being baptized as "Chanchifiu".

In recognition of his prominence during the development of the event, the president of Panam Sports, Neven Ilic, awarded the last gold medal of the Pan American Games to Fiu during the closing ceremony on November 5. A day later, the executive director of Santiago 2023, Harold Mayne-Nicholls, announced that Fiu will carry out a national tour in order to visit schools or other institutions that require its presence.
