= FIU (disambiguation) =

Fiu or FIU may refer to:

- Fiu, mascot of the 2023 Pan American and Parapan American Games
- Florida International University
  - FIU Panthers, the above school's athletic program
- Fighter Interception Unit, of the Royal Air Force
- Financial intelligence unit
- Finno-Ugric languages, with ISO code "fiu"
- Free International University, a defunct German artistic organization
- Kwara'ae language, also called Fiu
