= PhotoShelter =

American software company

- Type: Private
- Industry: Software
- Founded: 2005; 21 years ago in New York City, U.S.
- Founders: Allen Murabayashi; Grover Sanschagrin; Thomas Chin; Jeffrey Arnold; Jason Burfield
- Headquarters: New York City, U.S.
- Products: PhotoShelter for Brands; PhotoShelter for Photographers
- Website: www.photoshelter.com

PhotoShelter is an American software company that develops cloud-based digital asset management (DAM) software. Its products are used by organizations including sports teams, universities, media companies, and nonprofits, as well as by individual photographers. The company was founded in New York City in 2005.

== History ==
PhotoShelter was founded in New York City in 2005 by Allen Murabayashi, Grover Sanschagrin, Thomas Chin, Jeffrey Arnold, and Jason Burfield. It launched as an online archive, e-commerce, and portfolio hosting service for professional photographers. The company raised $4.2 million in Series A funding in April 2007.

In 2015, PhotoShelter introduced a DAM product for organizations, originally named Libris and later renamed PhotoShelter for Brands. That year, Campus Technology reported that Purdue University, Jacksonville State University, and the University of Central Florida had adopted the product to manage and share their photo collections. In March 2019, the company raised $8 million in a round led by Level Structured Capital. VentureBeat reported that its customers at the time included the Associated Press and several National Football League teams.

In 2021, private equity firm Clearhaven Partners made a growth investment in the company. That year, Major League Baseball expanded its agreement with PhotoShelter to cover all 30 of its teams. In a 2025 interview with Imaging Resource, the NFL's director of photography said the league processes and delivers its game photography through PhotoShelter.

PhotoShelter acquired the UK-based DAM company Third Light in 2022 and the social media content distribution company Socialie in 2023. In 2025, the Association of National Olympic Committees launched a digital content hub for national Olympic committees in partnership with Socialie. In October 2026, ANOC announced that it had extended the partnership through the 2028 Summer Olympics.

== Products ==
The company offers PhotoShelter for Brands, a DAM platform for organizations, and PhotoShelter for Photographers, a portfolio and e-commerce service for individual photographers.

== Recognition ==
- 2019: Shortlisted, Best Original Content or Programming, Hashtag Sports Awards
- 2020: Finalist, Best Branded Content Series (B2B), Digiday Content Marketing Awards
- 2025: Finalist, Best Use of Original Research, Content Marketing Institute Content Marketing Awards
