= Charles E Milander =

Dominican author, and businessman

Charles E. Milander
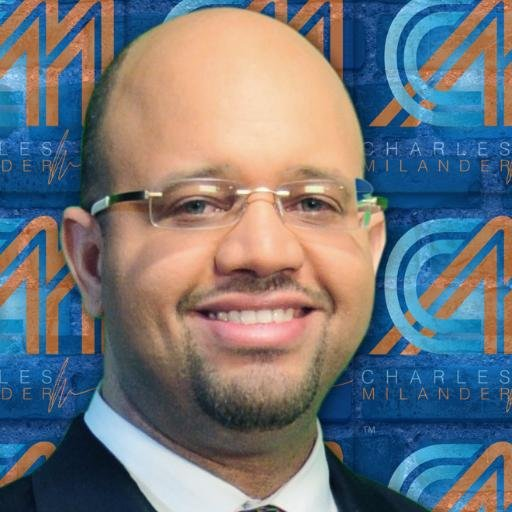
- Born: September 19; Santo Domingo, Dominican Republic
- Education: Colorado Technical University (B.S.B.A.)
- Occupations: Information Technology and Social Media Strategy Expert
- Years active: 1995–present
- Title: Information Technology Senior Adviser
- Website: charlesmilander.com

Charles E. Milander is an entrepreneur, author, speaker, pastor, life and business strategist coach. Milander is the author of four books on monetizing digital and social media platforms (Facebook, Twitter, Instagram, and Digital Marketing). He is an Associate Certified Coach (ACC) certified coach and an active member of International Coaching Federation (ICF).

Charles E. Milander is an Information Technology and social media strategy expert. He works in the design and management of software architecture, Internet technologies, network marketing, and product development. With diverse project management experience at Univision Communication, IBM., He developed and executed project concepts and strategies for various industries. He has worked with Dell, HP, JPMorgan Chase, Colgate Palmolive, and the Association of National Olympic Committees for 14+ countries and athletes. Milander has been a contributing correspondent for Mercado magazine of CNN Expansión, and the newspaper Listín Diario, and is a frequent guest for Univision TV and Radio, Telemundo47, Color Visión, and other shows.

== Early life and education ==
Charles Eulises Milander Rodríguez was born in Santo Domingo, Dominican Republic. He studied in Colorado Technical University in the United States, where he completed a Bachelor of Science in Business Administration (B.S.B.A.)

== Career ==
From 1999 to 2004, Charles Milander worked as a network administrator for IBM Corporation providing onsite engineering and technical support to network systems and web development. He designed a plan to backup over 300 terabytes of data, established and supported Internet connectivity for more than 10,000 end users through Microsoft Proxy Server, and provided analysis and troubleshooting for HP print servers. During this time, he also offered support for frequently used databases to document technical resolutions.

Milander also worked as a professor and Director of Technology at Manhattan Christian Academy from 2002 to 2004. During this time, he analyzed and designed new servers and storage systems to maintain Wide area networks (WAN) utilizing HP-Compaq, IBM, and Dell servers. He also optimized Local area networks (LAN) using performance reports and monitoring applications and devices. Milander also implemented TCP/IP core networking services using Windows Servers, and offered remote support using tools like PC Anywhere, Remote Desktop, and VPN. He later developed the school technological curriculum to target a high technical standard and up to date technology for better teaching results.

From 2001 to 2014, Milander worked as an IT Senior consultant for U-Tech Solution providing services of web development, software media strategies, social media management, network engineering, multimedia, quality assurance, documentation, and production operations to several companies. Milander's job was to ensure effective management by managing development groups for internal development systems, back end office automation and Internet technologies.

Milander also offered advice to the Association of National Olympic Committees (ANOC) and its President Sheikh Ahmad Al-Fahad Al-Sabah in terms of implementing a technological system for athletes records, statistics, ranking, and social media. He also served as the IT Senior consultant for the implementation of an athlete system for the Dominican Republic Olympic Committee and 32 sports federations. Milander also designed and standardized methods to facilitate new and upgraded architecture for web portals, and guarantee redundancy and load balancing aiming to increase uptime from 95% to 99.99%.

Milander has been a social media strategist, software engineer in networking and Internet technology, and has worked on several government projects. He currently works mainly in e-marketing, product development, quality assurance, project management, software management, relationship building, training and development, performance management, and databases.

Charles Milander has also been cited for his expertise as a Microsoft Certified Application Developer (MCAD), along with other certifications and achievements.

== In media ==
Aside of his work in the field, Milander has served as a guest and correspondent on numerous news and TV shows. He is a frequent writer for the newspaper Listín Diario, one of the leading newspapers in the Dominican Republic. His articles and writings range from reviews of new technologies to social media trends, among many others.

In 2014, he appeared on Telemundo47 as a technology expert. He has also collaborated for Mercado magazine of CNN Expansión, Univision Radio, Color Visión, and others. Milander is also a public speaker on topics like technology, web presence, and social media.

Milander currently produces and hosts his own show, CM XNAP, which airs on Color Visión.
