= Athbi Fahad Al-Ahmad Al-Sabah =

Former Kuwait military officer

Athbi Al-Fahad Al-Sabah
- الشيخ عذبي الفهد الصباح
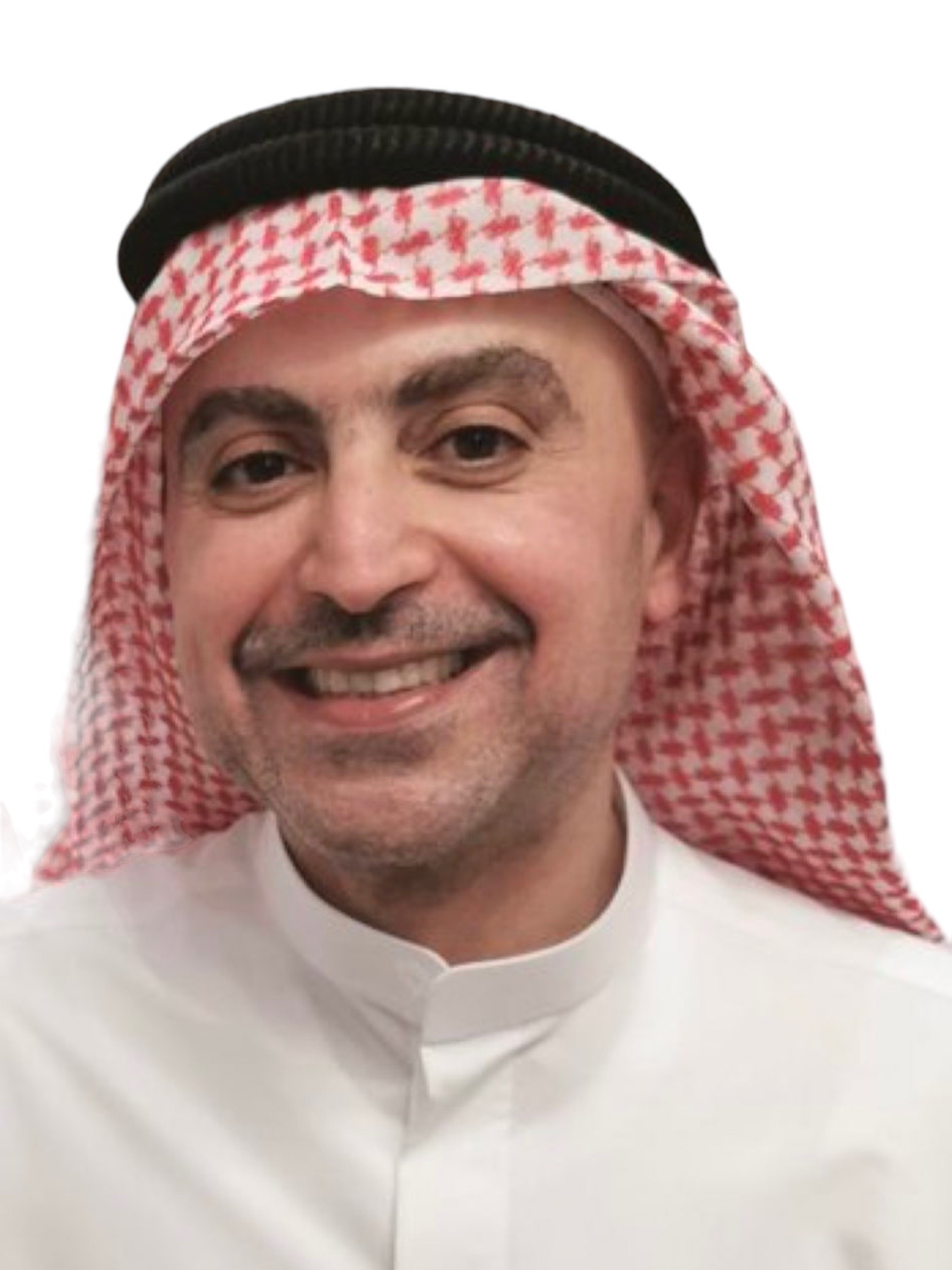
- Born: 1967 (age 58–59)
- Other name: Athbi Al-Fahad
- Citizenship: Kuwait
- Known for: Kuwaiti resistance during Gulf War, Fintas Group
- Father: Fahad Al-Ahmed Al-Jaber Al-Sabah
- Relatives: 4 brothers & 1 sister: Ahmad (brother); Talal (brother); Khaled (brother); Dhari (brother); Bibi (sister)

Athbi Fahad Al-Ahmad Al-Jaber Al-Sabah (born 1967) is a member of Kuwait's ruling Al-Sabah family and former head of the State Security Service. He is the third son of Sheikh Fahad Al-Ahmad Al-Jaber Al-Sabah and a retired officer in the special forces of the Kuwaiti Army. His career has been marked by controversies, including convictions for his role in a disinformation campaign aimed at inciting insurrection and for engaging in unlawful surveillance. On May 30, 2016, he was sentenced to five years in prison for his involvement in the Fintas Group affair, an attempt at insurrection, although he evaded incarceration. He was later included in a royal pardon issued on January 17, 2023.

== Military career ==
In the early stages of his career, he served as an officer in the Kuwaiti Army's special forces and was significantly involved in the Kuwaiti resistance during the 1990 Iraqi invasion of Kuwait. Throughout the occupation, he led a contingent of Kuwaiti resistors, steadfastly remaining in Kuwait despite the adversities faced, including the death of his father, Fahad Al-Ahmad Al-Jaber Al-Sabah, and the capture of his brother, Khaled Fahad Al-Ahmad Al-Sabah, by the Iraqi forces.

In 2005, he assumed leadership of Kuwait's State Security Service, serving as its head until his resignation in October 2006. He was reappointed as the head of the bureau in 2009, a position he held until July 2011.

== Legal issues ==
=== Fintas Group ===
Athbi Al Fahad was a prominent member of the Fintas Group, a Kuwaiti dissident faction implicated in a disinformation campaign in 2015 aimed at inciting insurrection. The group's activities centered around distributing a fabricated video on Twitter, allegedly showing Yousuf Al-Mutawa, the head of the Kuwait Constitutional Court, accepting bribes. The evidence, which included WhatsApp phone records, was presented in court, leading to Athbi's conviction and a five-year prison sentence in May 2016. Athbi evaded arrest, and in June 2016, a raid on his home uncovered weapons such as Kalashnikov rifles, ammunition, and a pen gun. Despite his absence, an appeal court upheld his sentence in July 2016, and in April 2017, the court of cassation affirmed the verdict after Athbi had fled Kuwait.

=== Unlawful Surveillance ===
Athbi Al Fahad, as the head of state security in Kuwait, was implicated in a high-profile legal case involving unauthorized surveillance and defamation. This case revolved around the interception and recording of private phone conversations of Marzouq Al Ghanim, the former speaker of the Kuwaiti parliament. The recordings were allegedly manipulated and then disseminated online to tarnish Al Ghanim's reputation. In 2017, the court confirmed these actions were unlawful and sentenced Al Fahad and others involved. They received a sentence of one year for illegal recording and distribution, plus an additional two years for other related offenses, alongside a fine of 5,000 Kuwaiti Dinars each. This case underscored significant violations of privacy and the law by senior security officials.

=== Pardon ===
On January 17, 2023, shortly after his close ally and first cousin Ahmad Al Nawaf Al Sabah became Prime Minister, Athbi Al Fahad was pardoned in an Amiri decree issued by his uncle, Sheikh Nawaf Al Ahmad Al Sabah. Athbi had notably served as the office director for Sheikh Nawaf during his tenure as Crown Prince.
