= Robin E. Mitchell =

Fijian sports official (born 1946)

Robert E. Mitchell

Acting President of the Association of National Olympic Committees
- Incumbent
- Assumed office 2018
- Preceded by: Ahmad Al-Fahad Al-Ahmed Al-Sabah

Executive board member of the International Olympic Committee
- In office September 19, 2017 – March 30, 2025
- IOC President: Thomas Bach (2017-25)
- Preceded by: Pat Hickey
- Succeeded by: Spyros Capralos

President of the Oceania National Olympic Committee
- In office 2013–2025
- Preceded by: Kevan Gosper
- Succeeded by: Baklai Temengil

President of the Fiji Association of Sports and National Olympic Committee
- In office 1997–2005
- Preceded by: Sophia Raddock
- Succeeded by: Vidhya Lakhan

Personal details
- Born: Robin Everett Mitchell; 10 March 1946 (age 80) Levuka, Fiji
- Education: University of Adelaide
- Occupation: Sports administrator

Robin E. Mitchell (born 10 March 1946 in Levuka) is a Fijian sports official.

A practicing medical doctor since 1977, he obtained his medical degree at the University of Adelaide in Australia. He was the team physician for Fijian athletes at the Olympic Games, Commonwealth Games and South Pacific Games from 1984 to 1992. In 1994, he was elected as a member of the International Olympic Committee (IOC), and remains a member to this day.

He served as Chairman of the South Pacific Games Organising Committee from 1997 to 2003, and simultaneously as President of the Fiji Association of Sports and National Olympic Committee from 1997 to 2005. He was Vice-President (1989–1993) then Secretary General (1993–2009) of the Oceania National Olympic Committees, and has served as its President since 2009. He is also, since 2001, a member of the Foundation Board of the World Anti-Doping Agency.

On October 20, 2022, he was appointed ANOC's president.
