= Gunilla Lindberg =

Swedish sports official

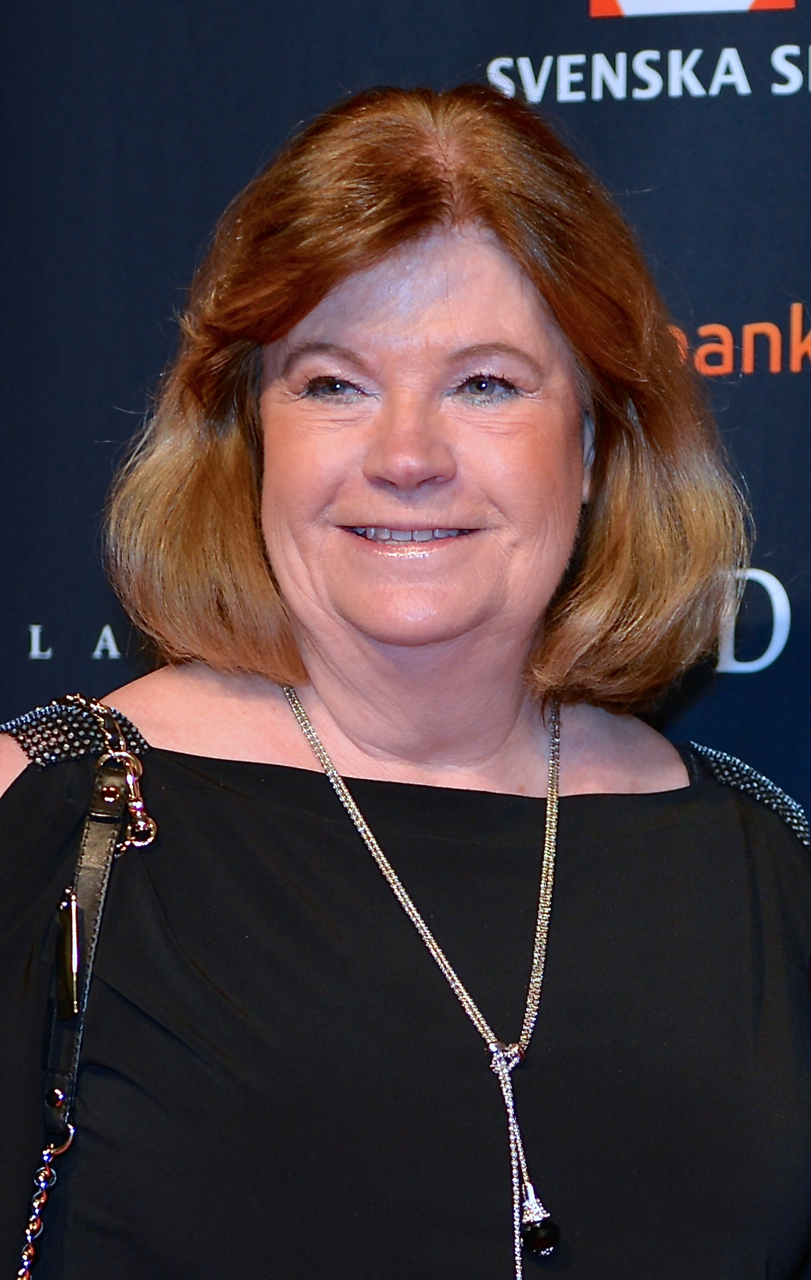
- Lindberg in January 2014
- Born: 6 May 1947; Upplands-Väsby, Sweden
- Occupation: sports official

Gunilla Lindberg (born 6 May 1947) is a Swedish sports official and member of the International Olympic Committee.

Lindberg took up a position in the offices of the Swedish Olympic Committee (SOC) in 1969, and was appointed SOC's Secretary-General in 1989. She was elected to the board of the European Olympic Committees in 1993, and was elected a member of the International Olympic Committee (IOC) in 1996. In 2000, she was elected to the board of the IOC, and from 2004 to 2008 she was one of four Vice Presidents of the IOC. In 2011, she returned to the IOC Executive Board.

Lindberg is also Secretary-General of the Association of National Olympic Committees.

== Honours ==
- (Sweden) H. M. The King's Medal, 12th size, worn on the ribbon of the Order of the Seraphim (6 June 2026)
