= Matthew Parish =

British lawyer

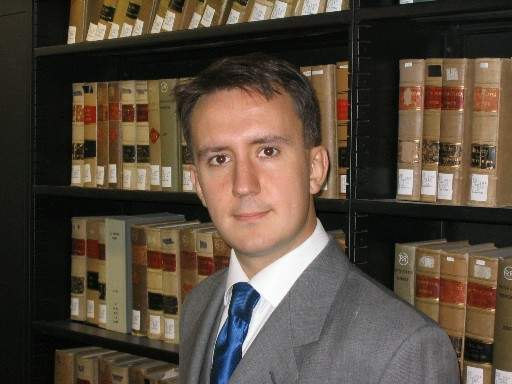
- Born: Headingley, Leeds, England
- Occupations: Lawyer, academic, author, international relations expert
- Website: matthewparish.com (archived on 4 November 2023)

Matthew Parish is a British international lawyer, author and scholar of international relations. He has written three books about his legal experience in the Balkans and about international law. He was convicted of forgery in Switzerland related to his client work and is currently suspended from practising as a solicitor in the United Kingdom.

== Early life ==
Parish was born in Leeds, in West Yorkshire. He is a graduate of Cambridge University.

== Career ==
Parish worked in the legal department of the International Supervisor for Brčko, part of the Office of the High Representative (OHR) in Bosnia and Herzegovina.

Parish left Akin Gump's Geneva office for Holman Fenwick Willan's (HFW) Geneva office in 2011. In December 2014 he and a colleague at HFW set up their own practice, Gentium Law Group. In November 2018 Parish ceased to manage the company, having handed control to a new partner, according to a filing on the Swiss Official Gazette of Commerce (SOGC).

=== Legal issues ===
In 2014, Parish was charged in Switzerland along with Kuwaiti politician Ahmad Al-Fahad Al-Ahmed Al-Sabah and others for their role in a fraudulent arbitration as part of a dispute between rival members of the Kuwaiti ruling family, involving falsely authenticating fraudulent videos showing corruption and breach of Iran sanctions. In September 2021, Parish was convicted and sentenced to three years' jail time and was banned from practicing law in Switzerland. As the AP reported, "Judge Gonseth said he was an arbitration expert and 'manifestly' involved at all stages of the process". On 18 December 2023, Parish had an appeal against his conviction dismissed, though an appeal against his sentence was partially allowed, with the custodial element reduced to two years' imprisonment, all of which was suspended.

In June 2018, Parish was indicted on charges of criminal defamation in Switzerland for making allegedly false reports to Western intelligence services accusing his former clients, Murat Seitnepesov and Konstantin Ryndin, of money laundering, fraud and financing terrorism. He was deemed a flight risk and was sentenced to two months in Swiss prison while the investigation was conducted. Parish wrote in a self-published book that he spent 23 days in prison. He was subsequently fined in February 2020, given a one-year suspended prison sentence, and instructed by the court to see a psychiatrist. Reuters reported that a spokesman for the Geneva prosecutor's office said: "Mr. Parish is found guilty of defamation, calumny, a coercion attempt and of failing to conform with an authority’s decision." Parish indicated his intention to appeal the conviction.

In September 2024, an order allowing Parish to bring a libel claim against the Wikimedia Foundation was dismissed by the High Court in London. Parish said that the Wikipedia article highlighting his legal issues was defamatory, as it had been published in England and Wales. Mrs Justice Steyn ruled that the London courts had no jurisdiction in the matter, as the issue related primarily to his career as a lawyer in Switzerland. The claim was also dismissed as it had been made more than a year after the date of publication, and because Parish had failed to disclose that he had been living and working outside England for over twenty years.

In 2026, Parish was suspended from practice in the United Kingdom for two years by the Solicitors Disciplinary Tribunal (SDT) after it found three of four allegations against him proved. The SDT found him to have complained about one of his client's conduct to intelligence and security agencies and to have offered to retract the complaints should that client pay his fees; to have published or allowed to be published press releases accusing his former client of fraud; and to have published on his website decisions made by the First-tier Tribunal and Upper Tribunal, in breach of anonymity orders.

== Publications ==
- A Free City in the Balkans: Reconstructing a Divided Society in Bosnia I.B. Tauris, London, October 2009. ISBN 978-1848850026. Parish's first book, on reconstruction in post-war Brčko, drew on his experience working for the OHR. The book has been criticized for being too sceptical of the international community's state-building efforts in the country.
- Mirages of International Justice: The Elusive Pursuit of a Transnational Legal Edward Elgar, London, May 2011. ISBN 978-1849804080. The book describes international law as "for the most part quite useless". According to a sceptical review by Christian Axboe Nielsen, the book "concludes by wishing that both international law and international organizations would disappear from the face of the earth". Nielsen compares the book unfavourably to A Free City in the Balkans, describing the latter as making "provocative and, by comparison, cogent arguments".
- Ethnic Civil War and the Promise of Law Edward Elgar, London, 2016. ISBN 978-0857934192
