= Richard Lai (football executive) =

Guamanian businessman (born )

- Born: March 29, 1962 (age 62); Hong Kong
- Occupation: President
- Organization: Guam Football Association; (2001–2017)

Richard K. Lai (born 29 March 1962) is a Guamanian businessman who was the president of the Guam Football Association.

== Life and career ==
Lai was born on 29 March 1962 in Hong Kong. He was born to Shirley Lai, a cafe owner born in Guangdong, China. He has four brothers and a sister. He moved with his family to Guam at the age of sixteen. He obtained an American passport. He attended John F. Kennedy High School in Guam. He participated in their track team and played soccer while attending the school.

In 2001, he was appointed president of the Guam Football Association. He helped the Guam Football Association join FIFA. He was described as "marked significant progress for the sport and for the community" while serving as the president of the Guam Football Association. In 2017, he was banned from football for life by FIFA for corruption. He has worked as the chief executive officer of Guamanian restaurant company Wing On Corporation. He has been regarded as a prominent figure in Guamanian society. He has been a political donor. He has been married. He has three daughters.
