= Fintas Group =

Kuwaiti dissident group

Fintas Group Disinformation Attack
- Date: April 2, 2015
- Type: Disinformation attack
- Motive: Inciting insurrection
- Perpetrators: Fintas Group: Hamad Al-Haroun; Athbi Al-Fahad Al-Sabah; Ahmed Al-Dawood Al-Sabah; Khalifa Ali Al-Khalifa Al-Sabah; Abdulmohsen Mohammed Al-Otaibi; Falah Hajraf Al-Hajraf

The Fintas Group (Arabic: قروب الفنطاس) is a Kuwaiti dissident group named after the homonymous WhatsApp group chat its members belonged to. Their notoriety escalated on April 2, 2015, when they launched a widespread firehose of falsehood disinformation attack across Kuwait aimed at inciting insurrection. This campaign, executed through WhatsApp, disseminated messages and fabricated videos suggesting a conspiracy aimed at undermining the state’s governance and judicial system.

In response to these activities, the Kuwaiti public prosecutor initiated legal proceedings against members of the Fintas Group. They were charged with 'intentionally broadcasting abroad false and malicious news and rumors about the internal conditions of the country, and violating a means of public communication by not showing due respect to the judges.’ The outcome of these legal actions led to the conviction of several group members.

== Legal proceedings ==
The charges in the case centered on a conspiracy to anonymously distribute a grainy, fabricated video on Twitter, depicting Yousuf Al-Mutawa, the head of the Kuwait Constitutional Court, accepting bribes. This was substantiated by WhatsApp phone records acquired by the court.

The Kuwaiti Criminal Court’s proceedings, as detailed in a 122-page judgment and reported by the Associated Press, culminated in the conviction of several individuals, including Hamad Ahmed Al-Haroun, who was sentenced in absentia to 10 years imprisonment on May 30, 2016. Key figures in the case also included members of the Al Sabah ruling family: Athbi Fahad Al-Ahmad Al-Sabah, Ahmed Al-Dawood Al-Sabah, and Khalifa Ali Al-Khalifa Al-Sabah. Each of them received a 5-year prison sentence. Legal professionals Abdulmohsen Mohammed Al-Otaibi and Falah Hajraf Al-Hajraf received identical sentences, while Saud Al-Asfoor was sentenced to one year.

Following their conviction by the court of first instance, Hamad Al-Haroun, Athbi Al-Fahd, Ahmad Al-Salman, Khalifa Al-Khalifa, and Lawyers Falah Al-Hajraf and Abdulmohsen Al-Ateeqi all evaded arrest and were subsequently tried in absentia in higher courts. Despite what the asylum tribunal described as credible evidence regarding his alleged crimes, Hamad Al-Haroun was granted asylum in the United Kingdom. The tribunal justified this by recognizing that his actions were politically motivated and directly related to his political beliefs.

Furthermore, the court acquitted several other defendants in the same case. These included Yousif Shamlan Al-Essa, Fawaz Abdullah Al-Sabah, Ahmed Sayyar Al-Anzi, Mohammed Abdulqader Al-Jassim, Meshari Nasser Buyabes, and Jirah Mohammed Al-Zafiri.

== Name ==
Fintas is the name of a coastal city located approximately 26 km away from the Kuwaiti capital.
