= Neven Ilic =

Chilean businessperson (born 1962)

Neven Iván Ilic Álvarez is a Chilean engineer and sports official that was born on 4 April 1962 in Antofagasta, Chile. He is a member of the International Olympic Committee (IOC).

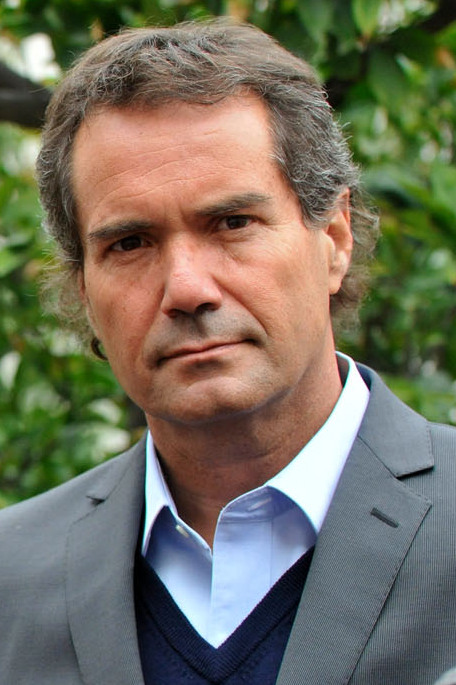
Neven Ilic, pictured sometime in the 21st century

== Education ==
Ilic studied Civil Engineering at the Pontifical Catholic University of Chile.

== Career ==
Some of Ilic's most important achievements while in charge of the Chilean Olympic Committee were the creation of ADO Chile, the Association of Olympic Athletes of Chile, the creation of the Olympic Sports Channel (CDO) with 24-hour transmission; The construction of the Olympic Training Center in Santiago with more than 29,000 square meters and the Olympic Training Center for Canoeing and Rowing in Curauma, Valparaíso; as well as the awarding of the hosting rights for the 2014 South American Games, 2017 South American Youth Games and the 2023 Pan American Games to the Chilean capital of Santiago.

== Sports career ==
Ilic was a member of the Network Stadium Commission, which studies the conditions of the different national stadium in order to improve their infrastructure. From 2000 to 2004 he was Director of the National Tennis Federation, as well as the Director of the High-Performance Center, National Tennis Federation. He was the chairman of the Olympic Athletes Association (ADO-Chile), a non-profit corporation whose goal is to position Chile as a top sporting nation. Ilic was a member of the Marketing Commission of the Association of National Olympic Committees (ANOC). In 2010, he was a member of the Evaluation Commission for the South-American Games, Medellín. He was president of the Organizing Committee for the South-American Games, Santiago in 2014, and President of the Organizing Committee Beach Bolivarian Games, Iquique in 2016. In 2017, he was President of the Organizing Committee for the South-American Youth Games, Santiago. From 2008 to 2016, he was a Member of the Executive Committee for the Pan-American Sports Organization (PASO), where in 2017 he was PASO President. In 2017 he was elected as member of the International Olympic Committee (IOC). 2014 he was a member of the Evaluation for Youth Olympic Games, as well as in 2018 when he was a member of the Evaluation for the Youth Olympic Games 2022. In 2019, he was a member of the Coordination of the Games of the 2028 Summer Olympics, and in May 2020 he ran for re-election at the Panam Sports General Assembly in Cancún, Mexico, where in October 2020 he was set to be re-elected with no votes against.

== Awards ==
In 2018, Ilic received the IFBB Spirit of Sport.
