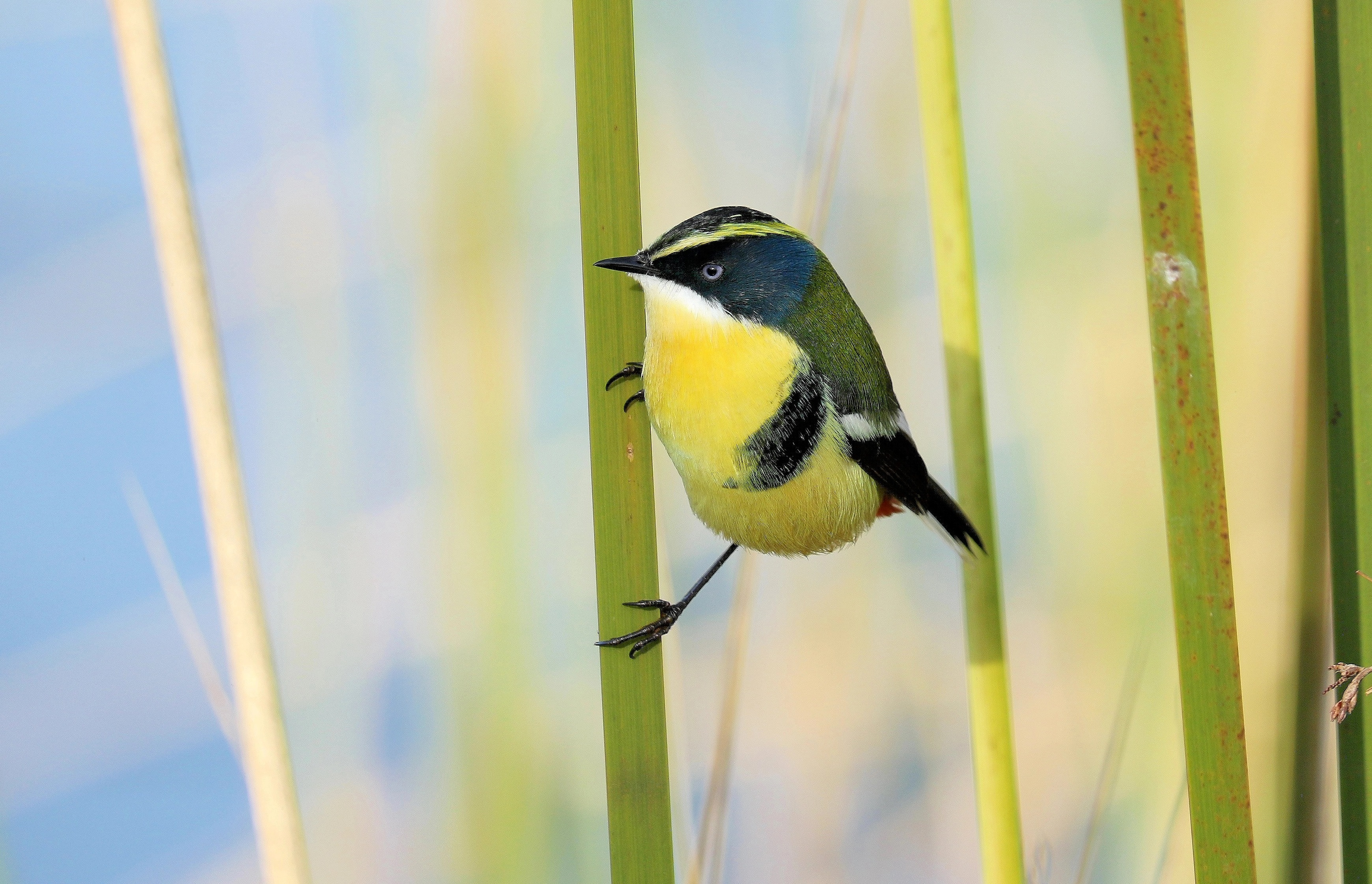

Conservation status
- Least Concern (IUCN 3.1)

Scientific classification
- Kingdom: Animalia
- Phylum: Chordata
- Class: Aves
- Order: Passeriformes
- Family: Tachurididae
- Genus: Tachuris; Lafresnaye, 1836
- Species: T. rubrigastra

Binomial name
- Tachuris rubrigastra (Vieillot, 1817)

= Many-colored rush tyrant =

Species of bird

The many-colored rush tyrant or many-coloured rush tyrant (Tachuris rubrigastra) is a small passerine bird of South America belonging to the tyrant flycatcher family Tyrannidae. It is found in Argentina, Bolivia, Brazil, Chile, Paraguay, Peru, and Uruguay.

== Taxonomy and systematics ==
A 2013 DNA-based study of South American suboscines found that the many-colored rush tyrant belonged to an isolated lineage that had been separated from other suboscines for around 25 million years. The authors proposed that it should be placed in its own monotypic family Tachurididae. It was subsequently suggested that the name should be Tachurisidae. Edward Dickinson and Leslie Christidis placed it in Tachurisidae in the fourth edition of the Howard and Moore Complete Checklist of the Birds of the World. As of late 2024 the South American Classification Committee of the American Ornithological Society classifies it as incertae sedis and is seeking a proposal to clarify its status. Other taxonomic systems retain it in Tyrannidae.

The many-colored rush tyrant is the only member of its genus and has these four subspecies:

- T. r. alticola (Berlepsch & Stolzmann, 1896)
- T. r. libertatis (Hellmayr, 1920)
- T. r. loaensis (Philippi Bañados & Johnson, AW, 1946)
- T. r. rubrigastra (Vieillot, 1817, 1817)

== Description ==
The many-colored rush tyrant is "the most colourful of all tyrannids". It is 10.5 to 11.5 cm (4.1 to 4.5 in) long and weighs 6.5 to 8 g (0.23 to 0.28 oz). Adult males of the nominate subspecies T. r. rubrigastra have a black crown with a slight crest and a partly hidden red patch in the middle. They have a large golden supercilium and glossy blue to black lores whose color extends onto the ear coverts giving a masked appearance. Their nape is ochraceous that blends into their bright moss-green back and rump. Their wings are black with white edges on the coverts and tertials that form a large bar when closed. Their tail is mostly black with white outermost feathers. Their upper throat is white and their breast and belly bright yellow with a wide, nearly complete, black bar across the breast. Their crissum is bright red to orange-red or pinkish red. Adult females have the same pattern as males but are slightly duller overall with a smaller crown patch. Immatures have an all black (no blue) mask, some yellow scaling on the back, and paler yellow underparts than adults without the black bar.

Subspecies T. r. alticola is slightly larger than the nominate, with a paler yellow supercilium and a darker, more blackish green back. T. r. libertatis has a less prominent and greener supercilium and a whiter throat and belly than the nominate. T. r. loaensis is smaller than the nominate. It has a green tinge on its supercilium with more white on the throat, a stronger yellowish ochre on the neck and breast, a paler grayish white belly, and more white on the tail than the nominate. Both sexes of all subspecies have a pale bluish iris, a black bill, and long black legs.

== Distribution and habitat ==
The many-colored rush tyrant has a disjunct distribution. The nominate subspecies has the largest range. It is found from southern São Paulo and Paraná states in Brazil south through southern Uruguay and Paraguay into eastern Argentina all the way to Santa Cruz Province. It also is separately found in western Chile between the Atacama and Aysén regions. Subspecies T. r. libertatis is the northernmost. It is found in most of the length of western Peru, between Piura and Arquipa departments. T. r. alticola is found in the Altiplano of central and southeastern Peru from Junín Department south through Puno Department into western Bolivia' La Paz and Oruro departments and northwestern Argentina as far as Tucumán Province. T. r. loaensis has a very restricted range within northern Chile's Antofagasta Region.

The many-colored rush tyrant almost exclusively inhabits large reedbeds in lakes and marshes; it also infrequently occurs slightly into adjoining grassy edges. In elevation it ranges from sea level to 4,300 m (14,100 ft) overall. It reaches 2,500 m (8,200 ft) in Brazil and attains its highest elevation in Peru, Bolivia, and Argentina.

== Behavior ==
=== Movement ===
The many-colored rush tyrant is partially migratory though the exact pattern is not well understood. Populations in the south move north while those further north are generally year-round residents. It reaches Brazil north of Rio Grande do Sul, Paraguay, and possibly northern Uruguay and far northeastern Argentina only in the austral winter.

=== Feeding ===
The many-colored rush tyrant feeds on insects. It forages singly or in small family groups, almost always concealed in reeds. It also forages on mud and floating vegetation but always near cover. It gleans acrobatically, sometimes hanging upside down on reeds.

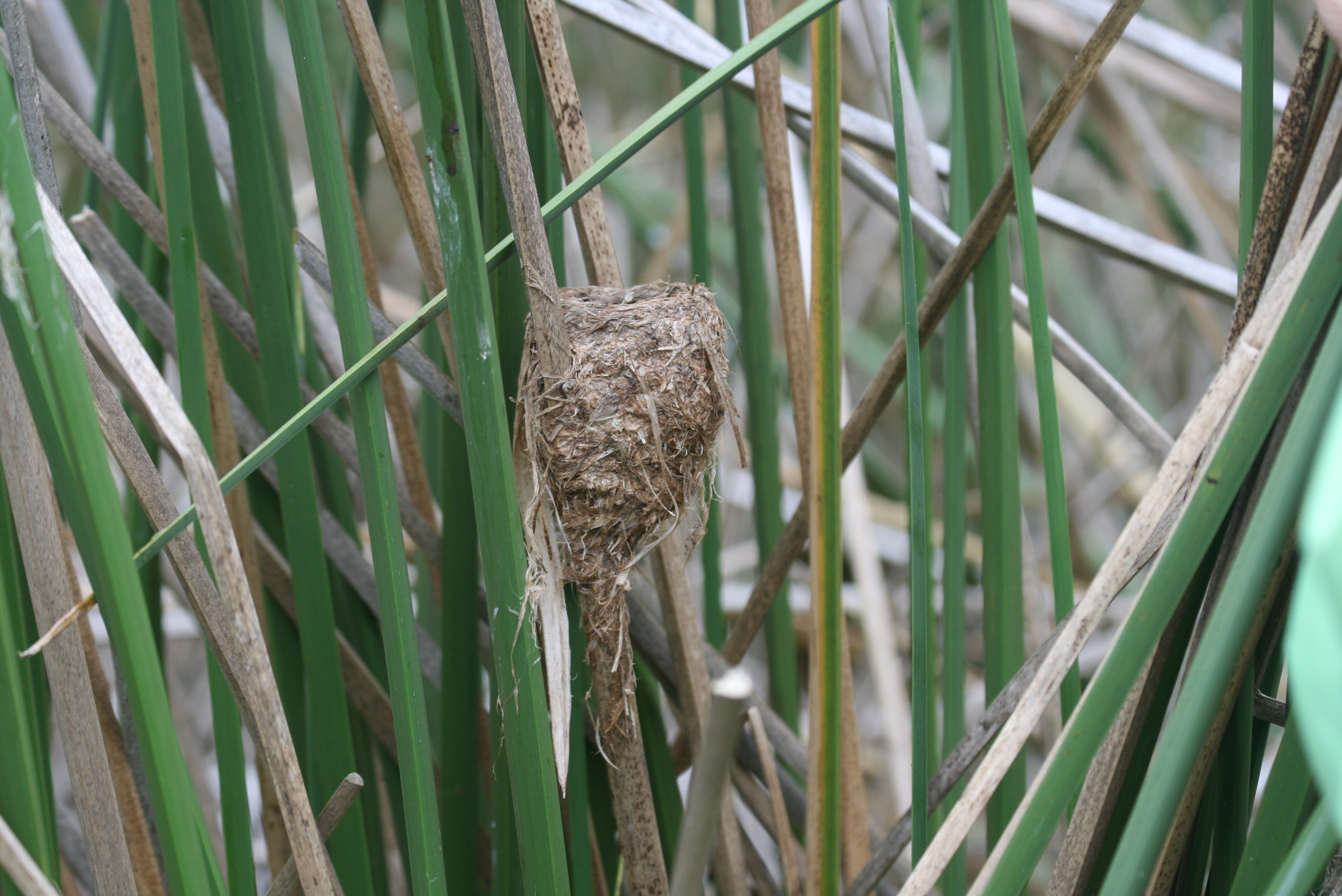
Many-colored rush tyrant nest

=== Breeding ===
The many-colored rush tyrant's breeding season has not been fully defined but includes September and October in Peru and Brazil. It makes a distinctive deep cone-shaped cup nest from wet reed leaves that harden as they dry; their consistency has been likened to cardboard. The nest is attached by its side to a reed. The usual clutch is three eggs; rarely a fourth is added. The incubation period, time to fledging, and details of parental care are not known.

=== Vocalization ===
The many-colored rush tyrant's song is "a quiet, mellow, pleasant series of noes with a short buzz near the start and ending with a loose musical rattle: kachup-brrr-kachup'yp'a'trrrrl. Its calls are "a loud keeYIP or kaCHOO and a quiet, popping pip.

== Status ==
The IUCN has assessed the many-colored rush tyrant as being of Least Concern. It has a very large range; its population size is not known and is believed to be stable. No immediate threats have been identified. It is considered locally common, often occurring in small colonies with apparently suitable unoccupied habitat between them. It is found in many protected areas.
