= Association of National Olympic Committees =

Sports organisation

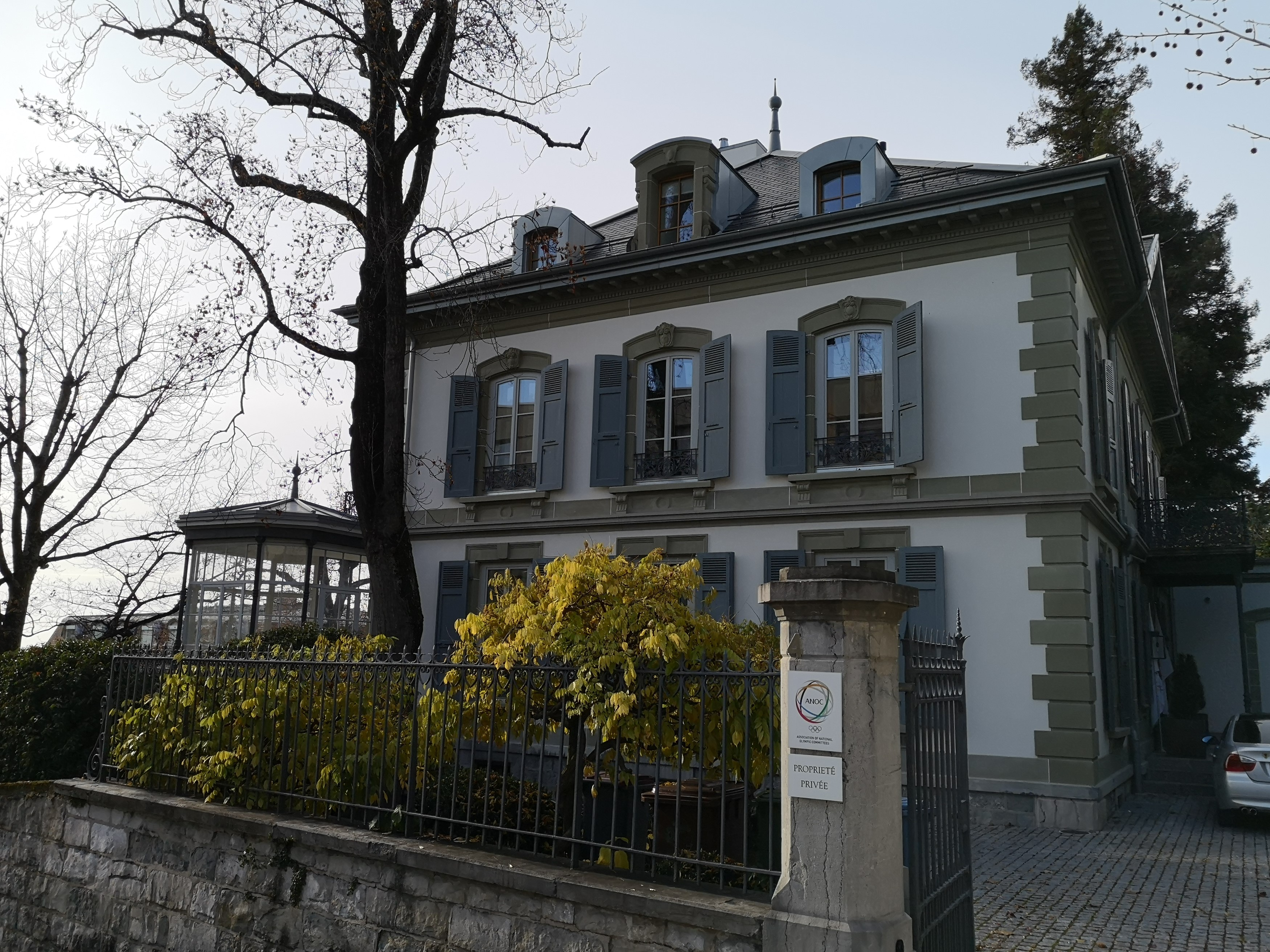
- Headquarters in Lausanne
- Formation: 26 June 1979; 47 years ago
- Type: Sports federation
- Headquarters: Lausanne, Switzerland
- Members: 206 National Olympic Committees; 8 Associate National Olympic Committees
- Official language: English, French, Spanish
- President: (Fiji) Robin E. Mitchell
- Secretary-General: (Sweden) Gunilla Lindberg
- Vice-President: (Qatar) Joaan bin Hamad Al Thani
- Website: anocolympic.org

The Association of National Olympic Committees (ANOC) is an international organization that affiliates the current 206 National Olympic Committees (NOCs) recognized by the International Olympic Committee (IOC). Every two years, it gathers all its members at the ANOC General Assembly, in which the ANOC Awards are awarded to NOCs and their athletes since 2014. The association organises the ANOC World Beach Games, a multi-sport event held every two years.

== History ==
The ANOC was established in June 1979 during the Constitutive General Assembly in San Juan, Puerto Rico. The organization's purpose is for the IOC to manage the general affairs for the National Olympic Committees, to give them their support, advice, cooperation, and recommendations for their development.

== 2023 presidential election controversy ==
On 8 July 2023, Talal Fahad Al-Ahmad Al-Sabah was elected president of the Olympic Council of Asia. Later that month, the International Olympic Committee (IOC) refused to recognise the result and asked Randhir Singh to continue as acting president while the election process was reviewed.

The IOC Executive Board imposed a three-year suspension on former OCA president Ahmad Al-Fahad Al-Ahmed Al-Sabah after approving recommendations from the IOC Ethics Commission. The commission found that Sheikh Ahmad had an "undeniable impact" on the election in support. of his brother's candidacy.

In October 2023, the IOC's Ethics Compliance Officer said that the election should be annulled and that Talal Fahad Al-Ahmad Al-Sabah's candidacy should have been declared ineligible from the outset.

In April 2026, the Court of Arbitration for Sport dismissed Sheikh Ahmad's appeal against the IOC Executive Board decision and upheld the three-year suspension. The panel found factual interference in the election process and concluded that the sanction was not disproportionate.

== Members ==
Its members are affiliated to one of five continental associations:

Continent	Continental association	President	Founded
Africa	Association of National Olympic Committees of Africa (ANOCA)	(Algeria) Mustapha Berraf	1981
Americas	Pan American Sports Organization (PASO)	(Chile) Neven Ilic	1940
Asia	Olympic Council of Asia (OCA)	(Qatar) Joaan bin Hamad Al Thani	1982
Europe	European Olympic Committees (EOC)	(Greece) Spyros Capralos	1968
Oceania	Oceania National Olympic Committees (ONOC)	(Palau) Baklai Temengil	1981

The organization was founded in 1979 under the presidency of Mario Vázquez Raña of Mexico. Since 2012, Sheikh Ahmad Al-Fahad Al-Sabah of Kuwait has served as the ANOC president. He self-suspended himself in November 2018 and Robin Mitchell was elected ANOC President during the XXVI ANOC General Assembly held in Seoul, South Korea on October 20, 2022.

== ANOC Presidents ==
No.	Name	Country	Term
1.	Mario Vázquez Raña	Mexico	26 June 1979 – 13 April 2012
2.	Sheikh Ahmad Al-Fahad Al-Sabah	Kuwait	13 April 2012 – 28 November 2018
Acting	Robin E. Mitchell	Fiji	28 November 2018 – 20 October 2022
3.	Robin E. Mitchell	Fiji	20 October 2022 – present

== ANOC Vice-President ==
No.	Name	Country	Term
1.	Patrick Hickey	Ireland	28 November 2012; 2017
2.	Robin E. Mitchell	Fiji	28 November 2018 – 20 October 2022
3.	Joaan bin Hamad Al Thani	Qatar	20 October 2022 – present

== ANOC Secretary-General ==
No.	Name	Country	Term
1.	Anselmo López	Spain	1980 – 1981
2.	Marian Renke	Poland	1981 – 1992
3.	Feliciano Mayoral	Spain	1994 – 2003
4.	Gunilla Lindberg	Sweden	20 October 2003 – present

== ANOC General Assembly ==
The ANOC General Assembly is the general meeting of the members of ANOC, held once a year in which each member has one vote. It is ANOC's supreme governing body and its decisions are final. The Assembly elects the President and the Senior Vice-president every four years, as well as the members of the Executive Council.

#	Host city	Country	Year
1st	San Juan	Puerto Rico	1979
2nd	Milan	Italy	1981
3rd	Los Angeles	United States of America	1983
4th	Mexico City	Mexico	1984
5th	Seoul	South Korea	1986
6th	Vienna	Austria	1988
7th	Barcelona	Spain	1990
8th	Acapulco	Mexico	1992
9th	Atlanta	United States of America	1994
10th	Cancun	Mexico	1996
11th	Sevilla	Spain	1998
12th	Rio de Janeiro	Brazil	2000
13th	Kuala Lumpur	Malaysia	2002
14th	Athens	Greece	2004
15th	Seoul	South Korea	2006
16th	Beijing	China	2008
17th	Acapulco	Mexico	2010
18th	Moscow	Russian Federation	2012
19th	Bangkok	Thailand	2014
20th	Washington	United States of America	2015
21st	Doha	Qatar	2016
22nd	Prague	Czech Republic	2017
23rd	Tokyo	Japan	2018
24th	Doha	Qatar	2019
25th	Crete	Greece	2021
26th	Seoul	South Korea	2022
27th	Cascais	Portugal	2024
28th	Hong Kong	Hong Kong	2026

== ANOC Awards ==
Since 2014, the Association of National Olympic Committees (ANOC) has given awards to the best athletes of the year. Traditionally, on even years, the ANOC Awards recognise achievements from the previous Olympic Games while on the odd years, the ceremony is dedicated to achievements from recent Continental Games or International Federation World Championships. The winners are selected from a shortlist presented to a jury by the Continental Olympic Associations.

Year	Host city	Award Category	Awardee
2014	Bangkok	Most Successful NOC of London 2012	United States Olympic Committee (accepted by Scott Blackmun)
2014	Bangkok	Best Female Team of London 2012	Team Brazil Volleyball (accepted by Fabiana Marcelino Claudino)
2014	Bangkok	Best Male Team of London 2012	Team France Handball (accepted by Daouda Karaboué)
2014	Bangkok	Best Female Athlete of London 2012	(China) Li Xiaoxia (Table Tennis)
2014	Bangkok	Best Male Athlete of London 2012	(Kenya) David Rudisha (Athletics)
2014	Bangkok	Most Successful NOC of Sochi 2014	(Russia) Russian Olympic Committee (accepted by Alexander Zhukov)
2014	Bangkok	Best Female Team of Sochi 2014	Team Canada Ice Hockey (accepted by Caroline Ouellette)
2014	Bangkok	Best Male Team of Sochi 2014	Team Canada Ice Hockey (accepted by Bob Nicholson)
2014	Bangkok	Best Female Athlete of Sochi 2014	(Netherlands) Ireen Wüst (Speed Skating)
2014	Bangkok	Best Male Athlete of Sochi 2014	(Norway) Ole Einar Bjoerndalen (Biathlon)
2014	Bangkok	Outstanding Performance	(Russia) Larisa Latynina
2014	Bangkok	Outstanding Lifetime Achievement	(Belgium) Jacques Rogge
2015	Washington	Best Male Athlete of the African Games 2015	(Republic of the Congo) Franck Elemba (Athletics)
2015	Washington	Best Female Athlete of the African Games 2015	(Ivory Coast) Marie-Josée Ta Lou (Athletics)
2015	Washington	Best Male Athlete of the Pan American Games 2015	(Brazil) Thiago Pereira (Swimming)
2015	Washington	Best Female Athlete of the Pan American Games 2015	(United States) Kim Rhode (Shooting)
2015	Washington	Best Male Athlete of the Asian Games 2014	(Qatar) Femi Oguonde (Athletics)
2015	Washington	Best Female Athlete of the Asian Games 2014	(China) Yao Jinnan (Gymnastics)
2015	Washington	Best Male Athlete of the European Games 2015	(Azerbaijan) Togrul Asgarov (Wrestling)
2015	Washington	Best Female Athlete of the European Games 2015	(Republic of Ireland) Katie Taylor (Boxing)
2015	Washington	Best Male Athlete of the Pacific Games 2015	(Papua New Guinea) Ryan Pini (Swimming)
2015	Washington	Best Female Athlete of the Pacific Games 2015	(Federated States of Micronesia) Jennifer Chieng (Boxing)
2015	Washington	Outstanding Performance	(United States) Bob Beamon
2015	Washington	Outstanding Lifetime Achievement	(Italy) Francesco Ricci Bitti
2015	Washington	Contribution to the Olympic Movement	(Germany) Thomas Bach
2016	Doha	Best Female Athlete of Rio 2016	(Puerto Rico) Monica Puig (Tennis)
2016	Doha	Best Male Athlete of Rio 2016	(South Africa) Wayde Van Niekerk (Athletics)
2016	Doha	Best Female Team of Rio 2016	(United Kingdom) Team GB Hockey (accepted by Hollie Webb)
2016	Doha	Best Male Team of Rio 2016	Team Fiji Rugby Sevens (accepted by Osea Kolinisau)
2016	Doha	ANOC Award for Most Inspirational Performance	(Brazil) Rafaela Silva (Judo)
2016	Doha	Most Successful NOC of Rio 2016	(United Kingdom) Team GB (accepted by Lord Sebastian Coe)
2016	Doha	ANOC Award for Inspiring Hope through Sport	(International Olympic Committee) Refugee Olympic Team (accepted by Tegla Loroupe)
2016	Doha	ANOC Award for the Success of Rio 2016	(Brazil) Carlos Nuzman
2016	Doha	Contribution to the Olympic Movement	(Qatar) H.H. Sheikh Tamim bin Hamad Al Thani
2017	Prague	Best Female Athlete from Africa 2017	(Egypt) Farida Osman (Swimming)
2017	Prague	Best Male Athlete from Africa 2017	(South Africa) Chad Le Clos (Swimming)
2017	Prague	Best Female Athlete from the Americas 2017	(Venezuela) Yulimar Rojas (Athletics)
2017	Prague	Best Male Athlete from Americas 2017	Trinidad and Tobago 4 x 400 team (Athletics)
2017	Prague	Best Female Athlete from Asia 2017	(China) Yu Song (Judo)
2017	Prague	Best Male Athlete from Asia 2017	(Qatar) Mutaz Essa Barshim (Athletics)
2017	Prague	Best Female Athlete from Europe 2017	(Sweden) Sarah Sjöström (Swimming)
2017	Prague	Best Male Athlete from Europe 2017	(Austria) Marcel Hirscher (Skiing)
2017	Prague	Best Female Athlete from Oceania 2017	(New Zealand) Sarah Goss (Rugby)
2017	Prague	Best Male Athlete from Oceania 2017	(New Zealand) Robbie Manson (Rowing)
2017	Prague	Outstanding Performance	(Romania) Nadia Comaneci
2017	Prague	Outstanding Lifetime Achievement	(Uruguay) Julio Maglione
2017	Prague	Contribution to the Olympic Movement	(Jamaica) Michael Fennell
2018	Tokyo	Best Female Athlete of PyeongChang 2018	(Italy) Arianna Fontana (Short Track)
2018	Tokyo	Best Male Athlete of PyeongChang 2018	(United States) Shaun White (Snowboarding)
2018	Tokyo	Best Female Team of PyeongChang 2018	Sweden Curling Team
2018	Tokyo	Best Male Team of PyeongChang 2018	(United States) USA Curling Team
2018	Tokyo	Most Successful NOC of PyeongChang 2018	(Norway) Norwegian Olympic and Paralympic Committee and Confederation of Sports
2018	Tokyo	ANOC Award for Inspiring Hope through Sport	(International Olympic Committee) Unified Korean Ice Hockey Team
2018	Tokyo	Outstanding Performance	(South Korea) Yuna Kim
2018	Tokyo	Outstanding Athlete	(Norway) Bjørn Dæhlie
2018	Tokyo	Contribution to the Olympic Movement	(Italy) Mario Pescante
2019	Doha	Best Female Athlete of the African Games Rabat 2019	(South Africa) Erin Gallagher (Swimming)
2019	Doha	Best Male Athlete of the African Games Rabat 2019	(Zambia) Sydney Siame (Athletics)
2019	Doha	Best Female Athlete of the Pan American Games Lima 2019	(Colombia) Mariana Pajón (BMX)
2019	Doha	Best Male Athlete of the Pan American Games Lime 2019	(Cuba) Julio Cesar La Cruz (Boxing)
2019	Doha	Best Female Athlete of the Asian Games Jakarta-Palembang 2018	(China) Chen Yile (Gymnastics)
2019	Doha	Best Male Athlete of the Asian Games Jakarta-Palembang 2018	(Kuwait) Ali Al Kharafi (Equestrian)
2019	Doha	Best Female Athlete of the European Games Minsk 2019	(Russia) Dina Averina (Gymnastics)
2019	Doha	Best Male Athlete of the European Games Minsk 2019	(Italy) Mauro Nespoli (Archery)
2019	Doha	Best Female Athlete of the Pacific Games Samoa 2019	(Papua New Guinea) Toea Wisil (Athletics)
2019	Doha	Best Male Athlete of the Pacific Games Samoa 2019	(Samoa) Brandon Schuster (Swimming)
2019	Doha	Outstanding Performance	(Germany) Katarina Witt
2019	Doha	Outstanding Athlete	(Japan) Yasuhiro Yamashita
2019	Doha	Outstanding Lifetime Achievement	(South Africa) Sam Ramsamy
2019	Doha	Contribution to the Olympic Movement	(Qatar) H.E. Sheikh Joaan bin Hamad bin Khalifa Al Thani
2021	Crete	Best Male Team of Tokyo 2020	Japan (Baseball)
2021	Crete	Best Female Team of Tokyo 2020	New Zealand (Rugby Sevens)
2021	Crete	Best Male Athlete of Tokyo 2020	(Kenya) Eliud Kipchoge (Athletics)
2021	Crete	Best Female Athlete of Tokyo 2020	(Canada) Maggie Mac Neil (Swimming)
2021	Crete	Best Male Multiple Athlete Event of Tokyo 2020	(Italy) Italian Cycling Track Team Pursuit (Cycling)
2021	Crete	Best Female Multiple Athlete Event of Tokyo 2020	Estonia Fencing Épée Team (Fencing)
2021	Crete	Outstanding Athlete Performance	(Cuba) Mijaín López (Wrestling)
2021	Crete	Outstanding NOC Performance	(Japan) Japanese Olympic Committee
2021	Crete	Contribution to the Olympic Movement	(Australia) John Coates
2022	Seoul	Best Female Team Performance of Beijing 2022	Women's Canada Ice Hockey team (Ice Hockey)
2022	Seoul	Best Male Team Performance of Beijing 2022	(Sweden) Men's Swedish Curling Team (Curling)
2022	Seoul	Best Mixed Team Event Performance of Beijing 2022	(United States) Nick Baumgartner & Lindsey Jacobellis (Snowboard Cross)
2022	Seoul	Best Female Performance of Beijing 2022	(China) Ailing Eileen Gu (Freestyle Skiing)
2022	Seoul	Best Male Performance of Beijing 2022	(South Korea) Hwang Dae-heon (Short Track)
2022	Seoul	Outstanding Sporting Career	(Netherlands) Sven Kramer (Speed Skating)
2022	Seoul	Outstanding NOC Performance	(China) Chinese Olympic Committee
2022	Seoul	Contribution to the Olympic Movement	(United Kingdom) Sir Craig Reedie
2024	Cascais	Best Female Team Performance of Paris 2024	Women's Italy Volleyball team (represented by Carlotta Cambi)
2024	Cascais	Best Male Team Performance of Paris 2024	Men's Handball Denmark team (represented by Hans Lindberg)
2024	Cascais	Best Female Team Performance in Individual Sport of Paris 2024	(United Kingdom) Great Britain Cycling - Team Sprint (represented by Sophie Capewell, Katy Marchant & Emma Finucane)
2024	Cascais	Best Male Team Performance in Individual Sport of Paris 2024	Japan Artistic Gymnastics (represented by Kazuma Kaya)
2024	Cascais	Best Mixed Team Performance in Individual Sport of Paris 2024	Austria Sailing - Mixed Dinghy (represented by Lara Vadlau & Lukas Mähr)
2024	Cascais	Best Female Performance of Paris 2024	(Saint Lucia) Julien Alfred (Athletic)
2024	Cascais	Best Male Performance of Paris 2024	(Botswana) Letsile Tebogo (Athletic)
2024	Cascais	Outstanding Female Sporting Career	(New Zealand) Lisa Carrington (Canoe)
2024	Cascais	Outstanding Male Sporting Career	(China) Ma Long (Ping pong)
2024	Cascais	Outstanding NOC Performance	(France) French Olympic Committee
2024	Cascais	Contribution to the Olympic Movement	(United States) Anita DeFrantz
2026	Hong Kong		
