= Comparative army officer ranks of Asia =

Rank comparison chart of armies and land forces of Asian states.

== Officers ==
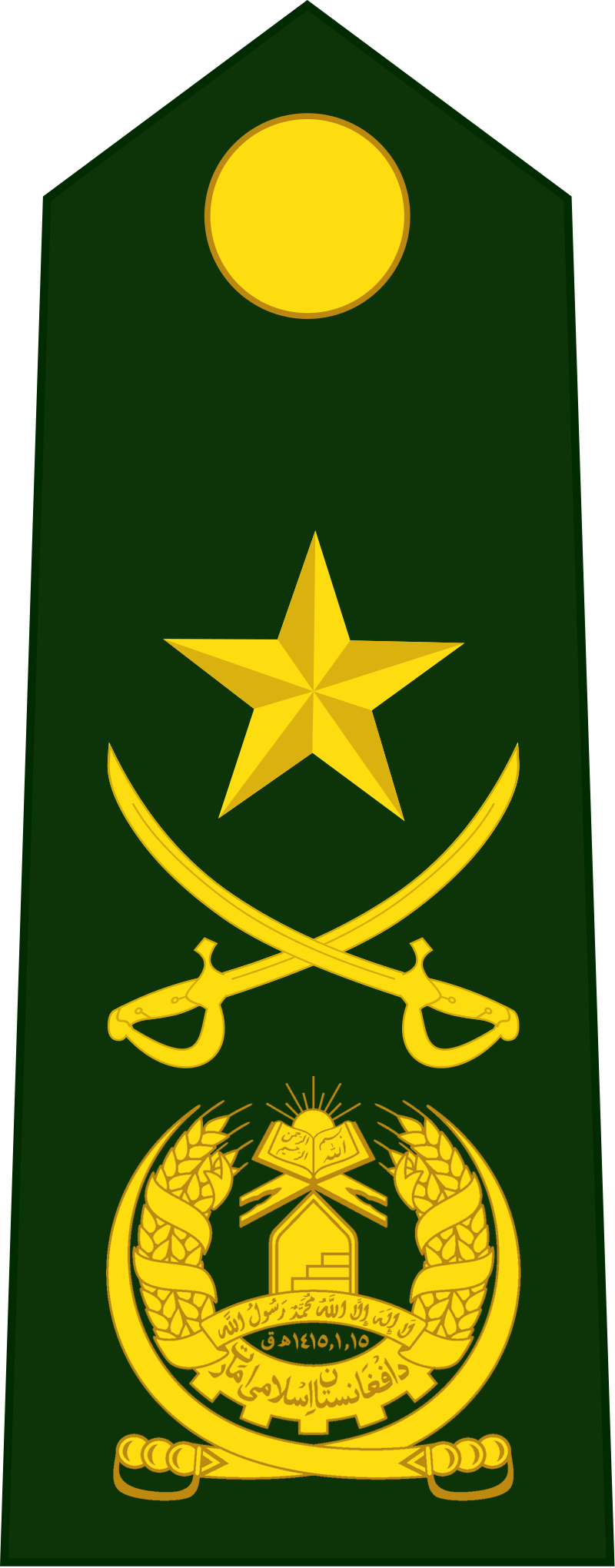
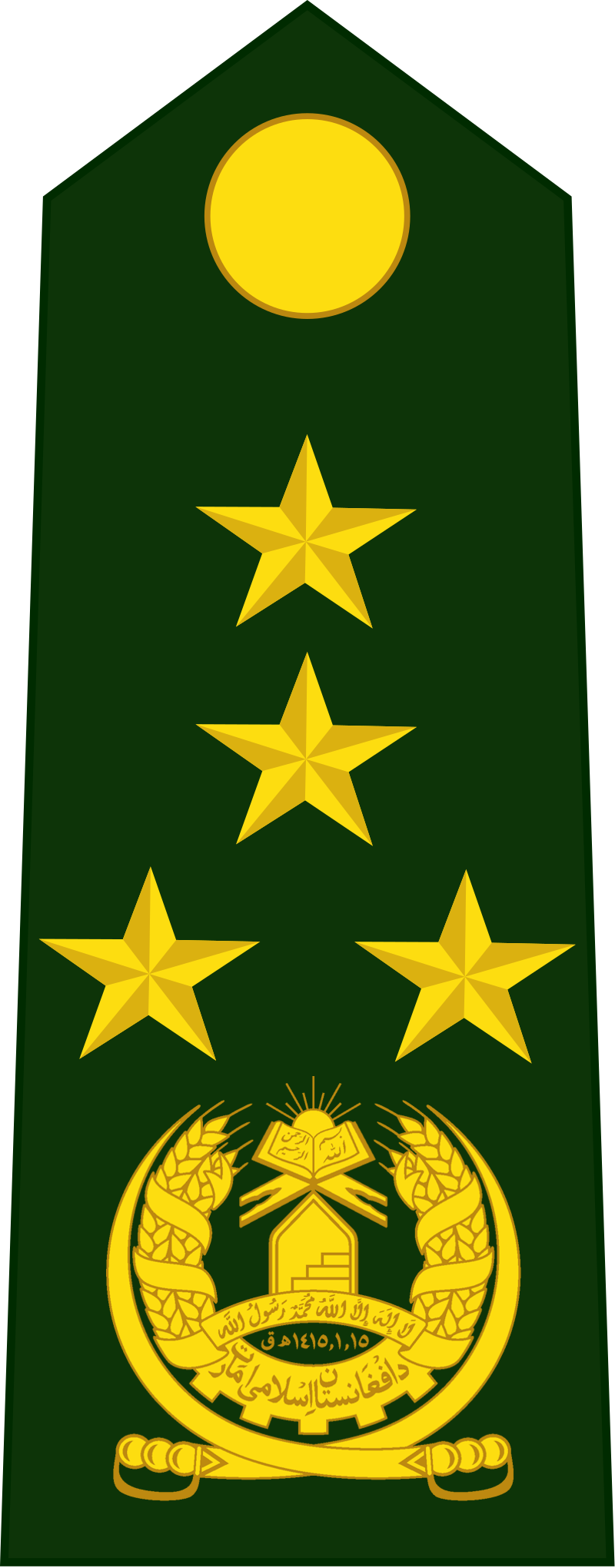
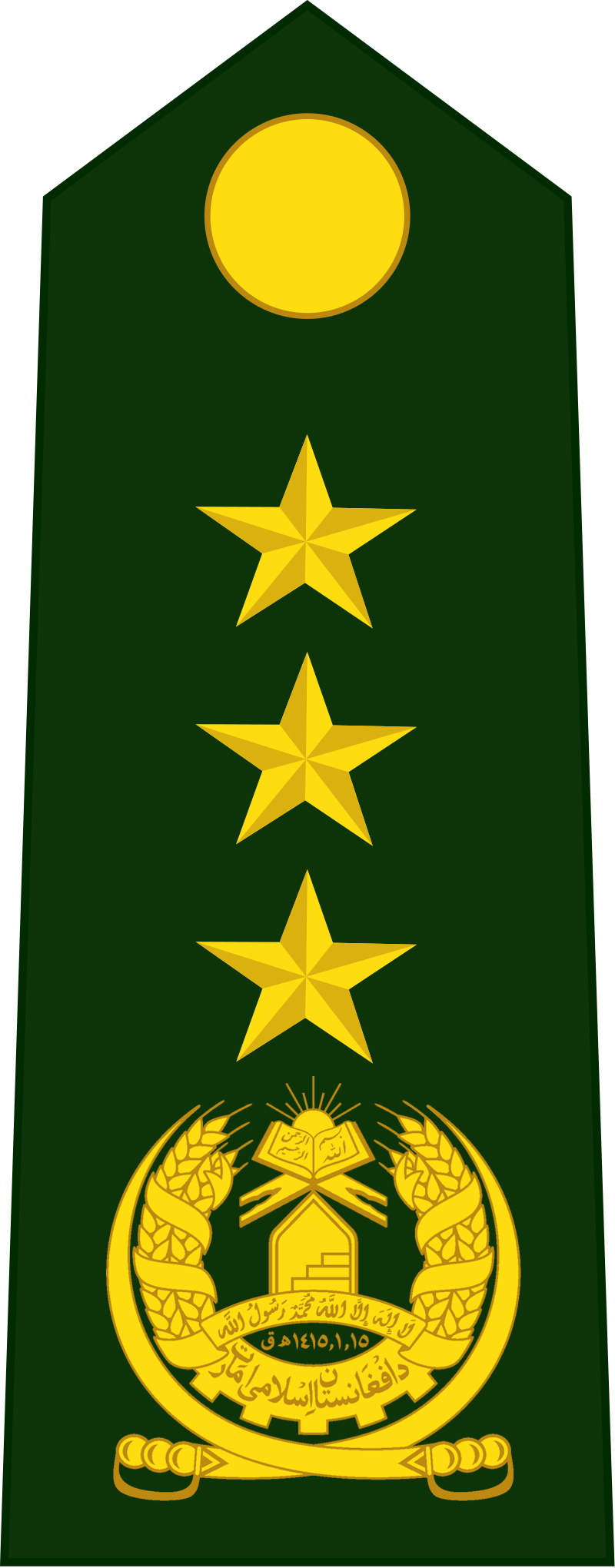
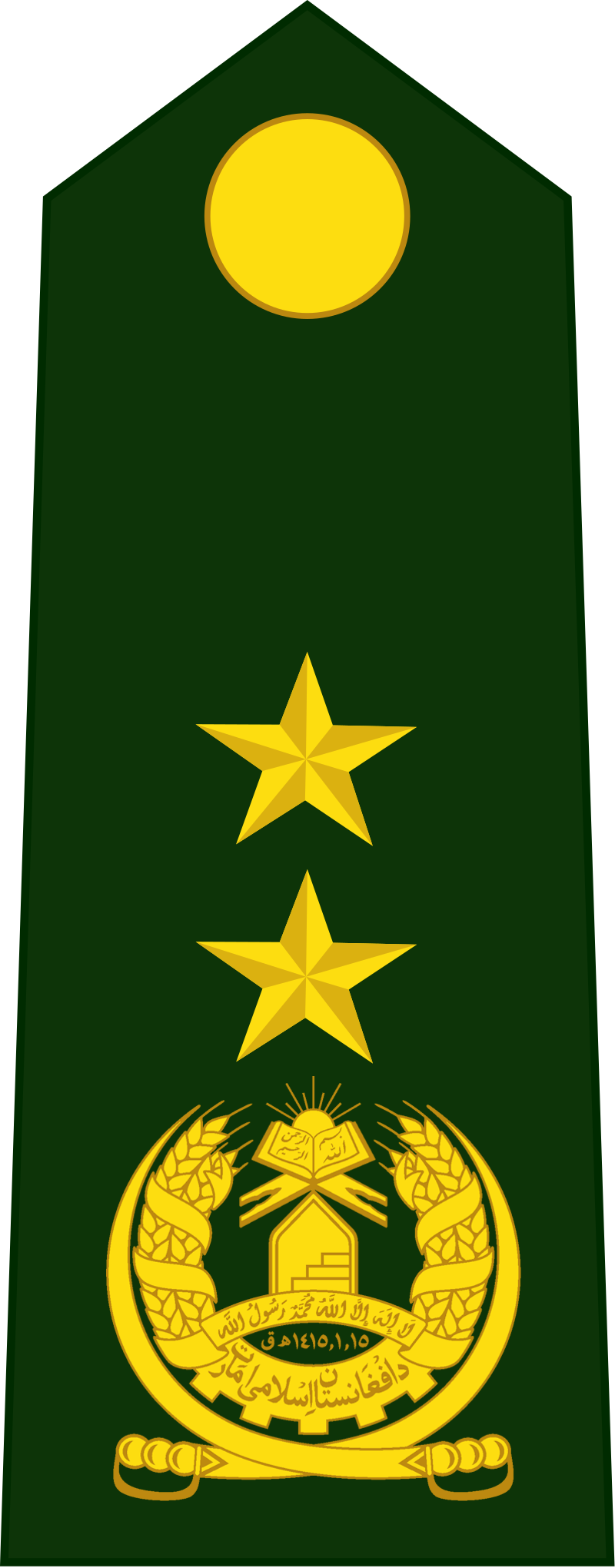
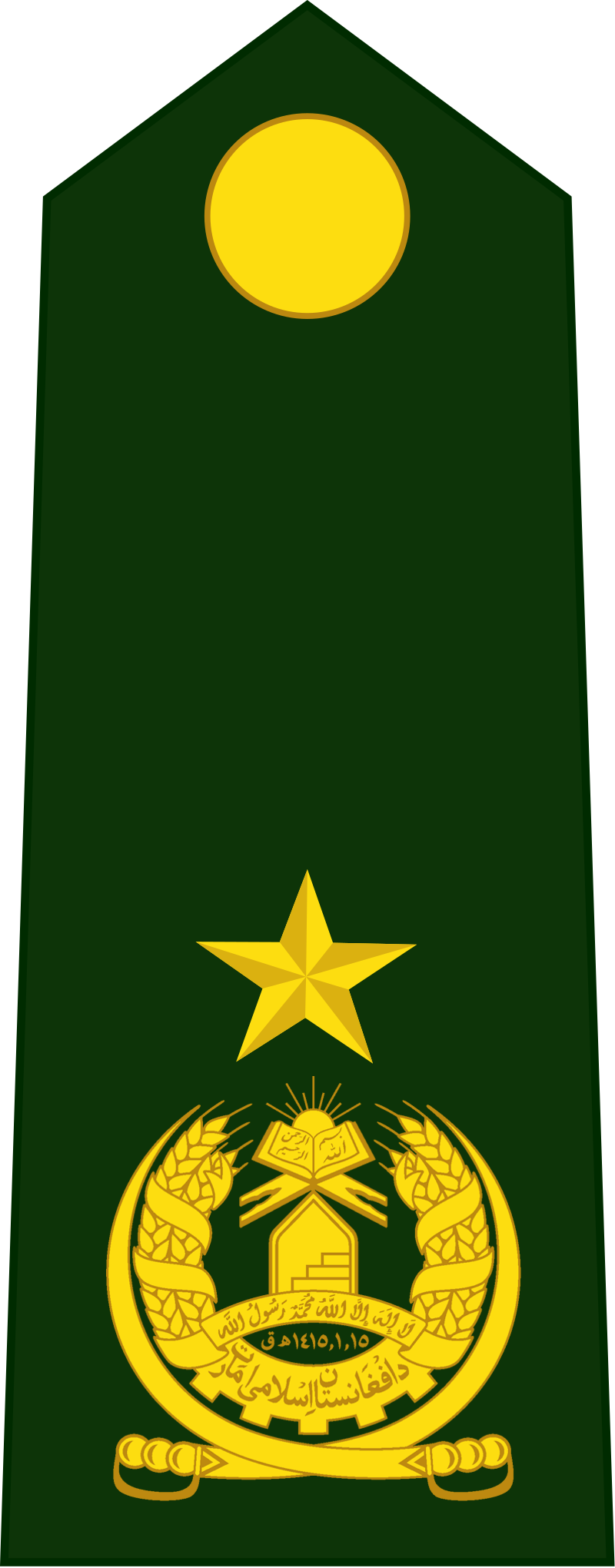
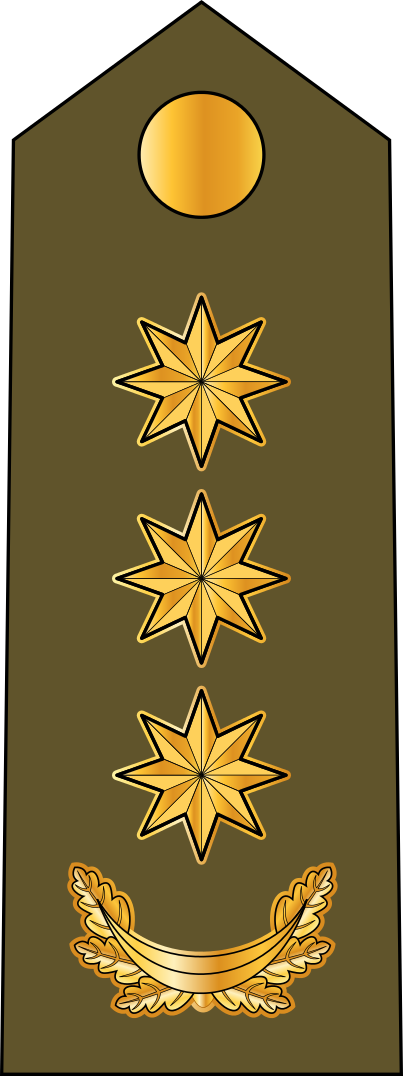
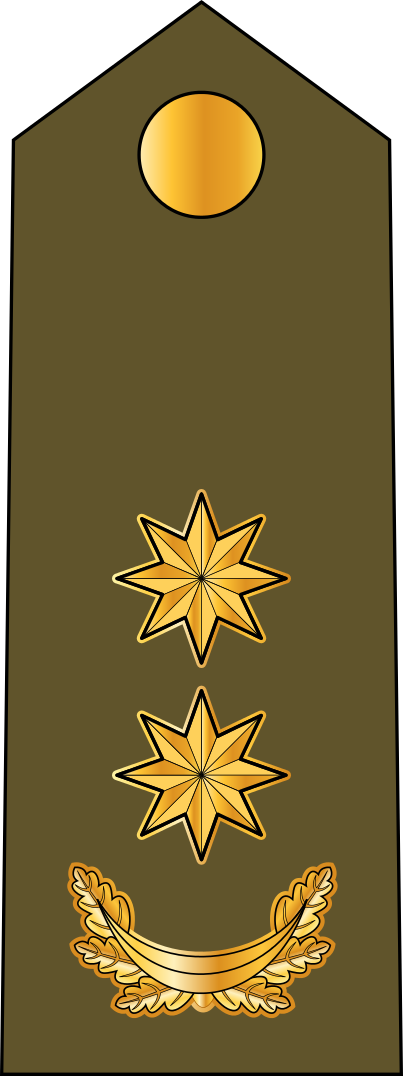
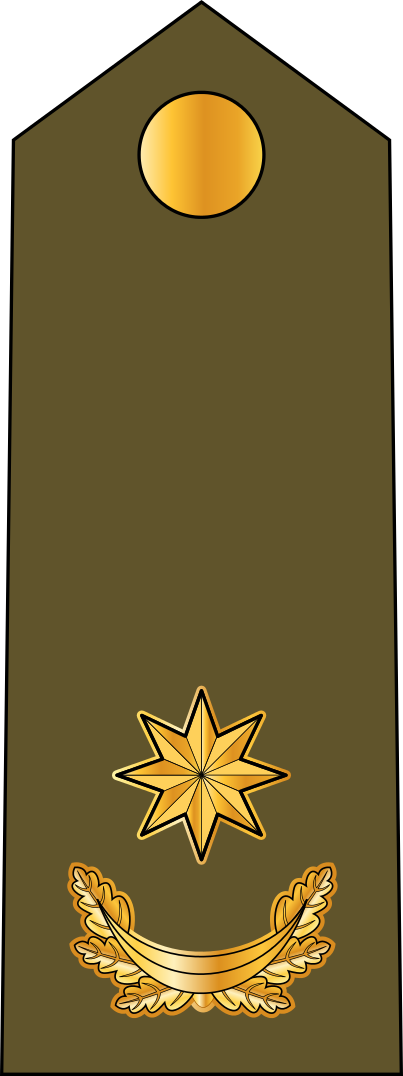
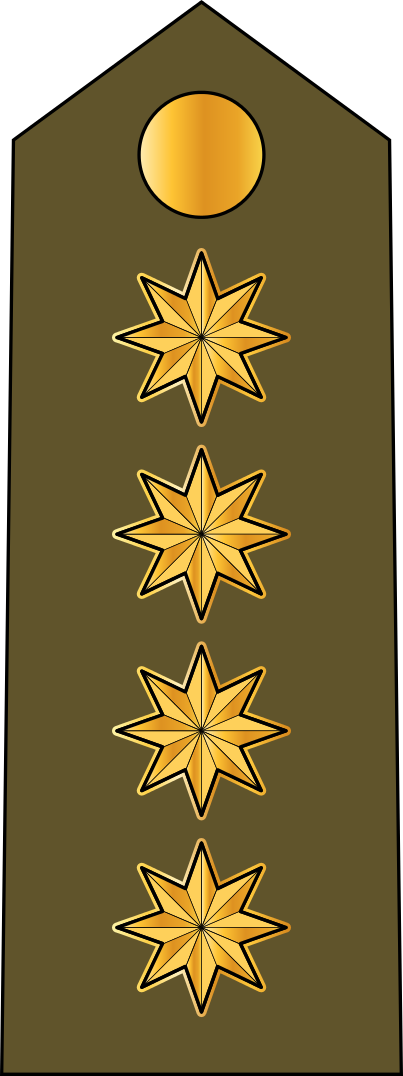
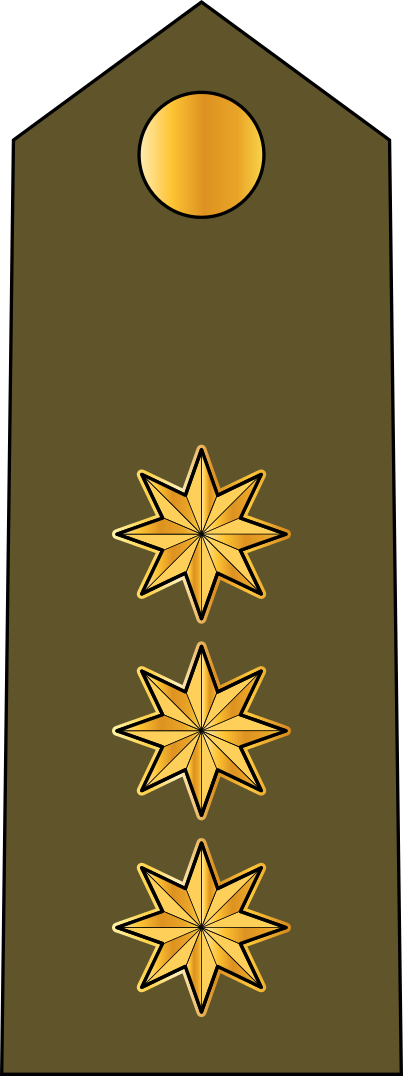
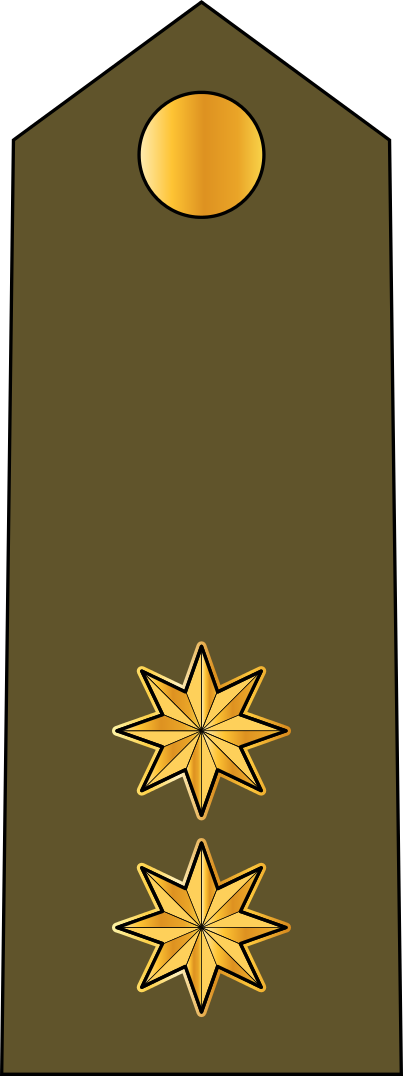
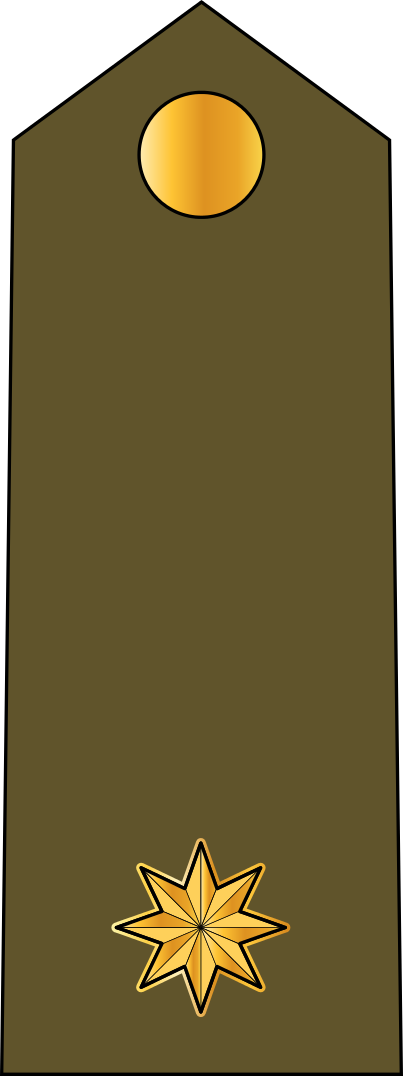
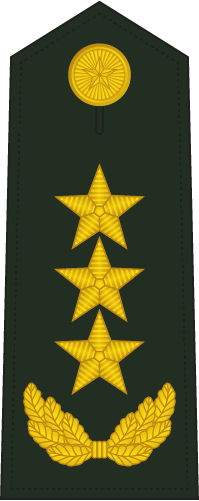
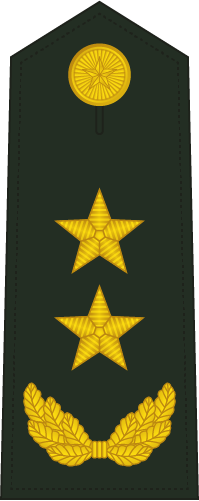
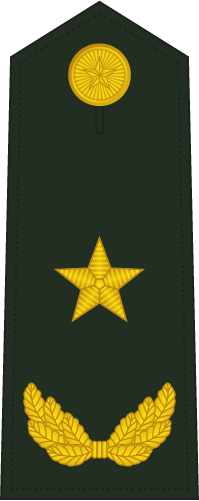
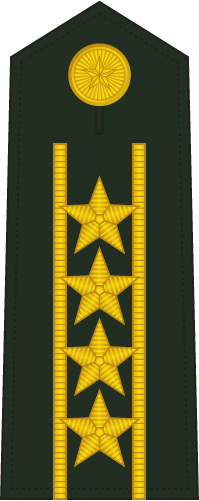
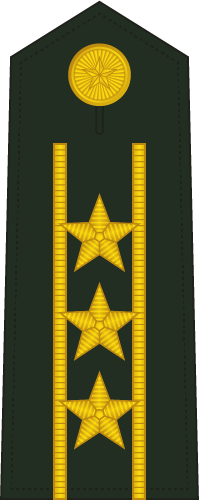
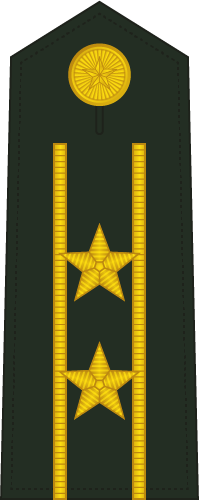
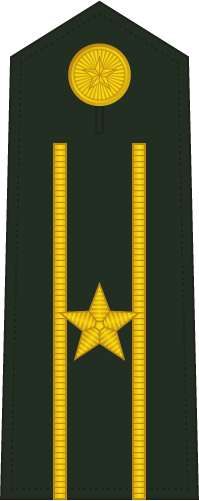
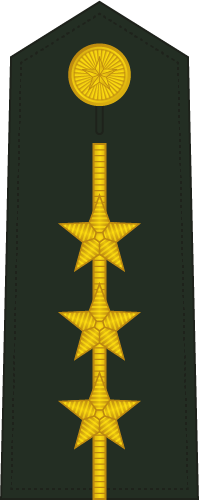
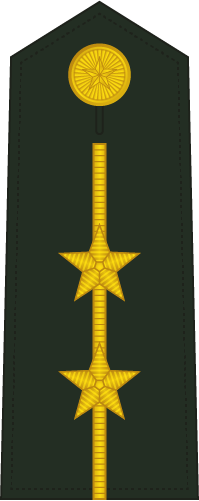
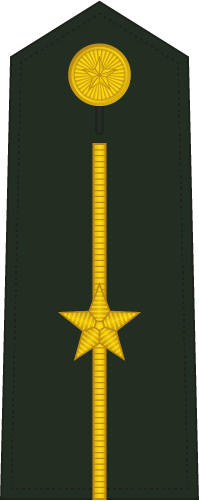
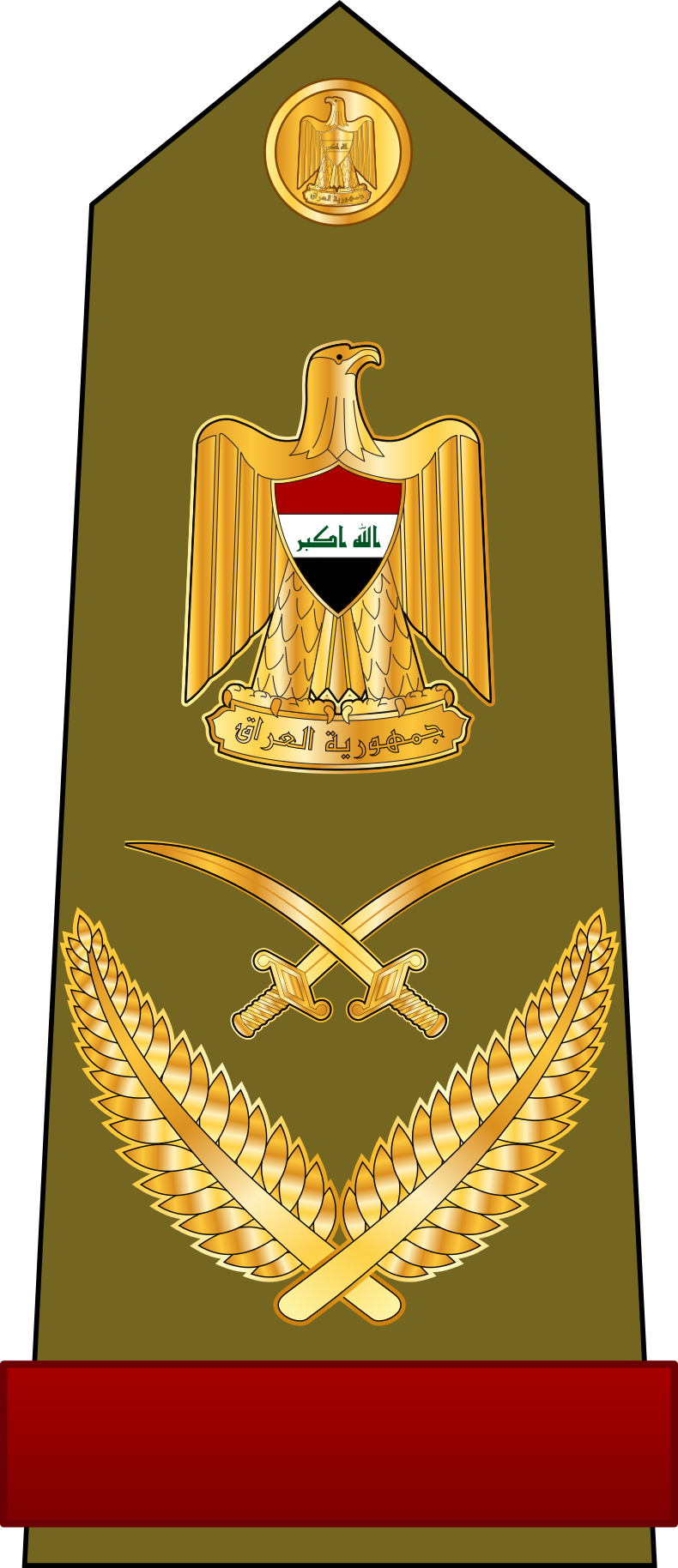
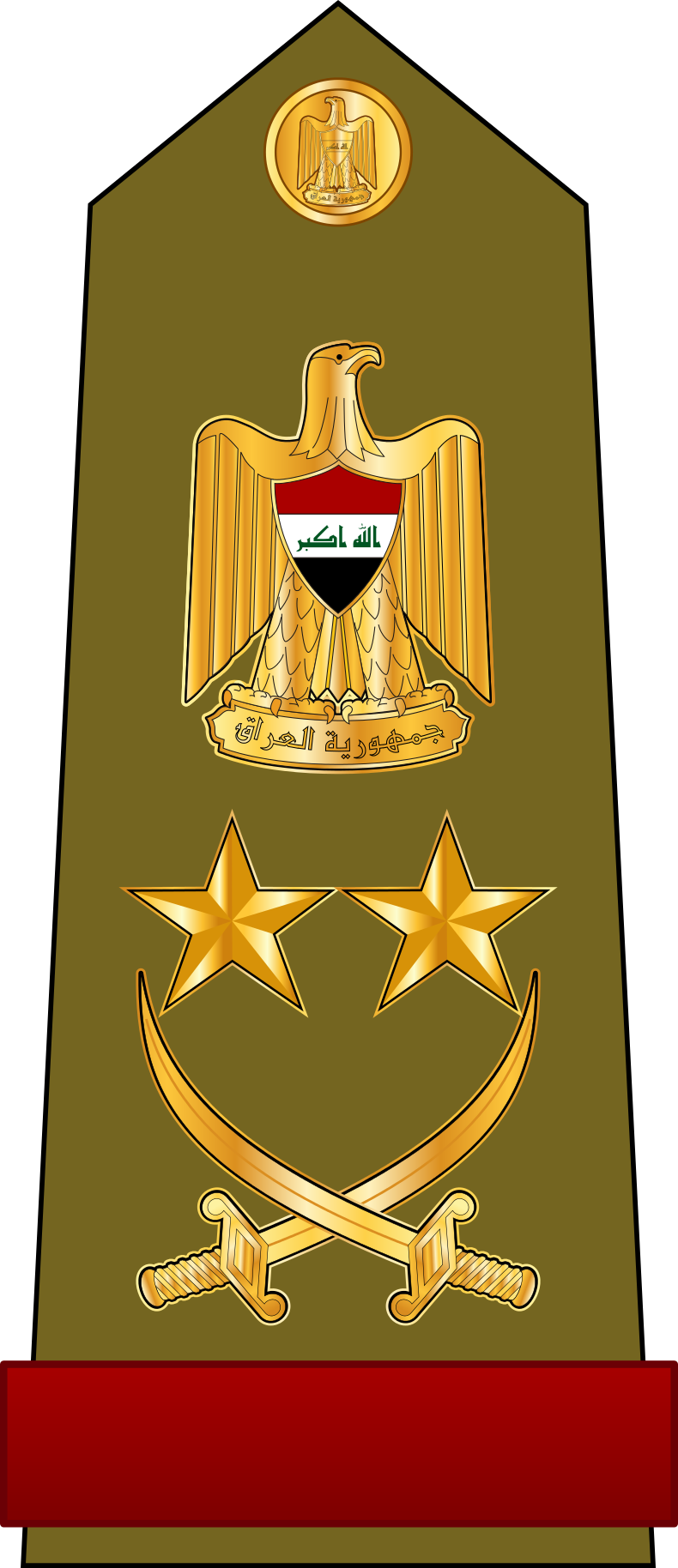
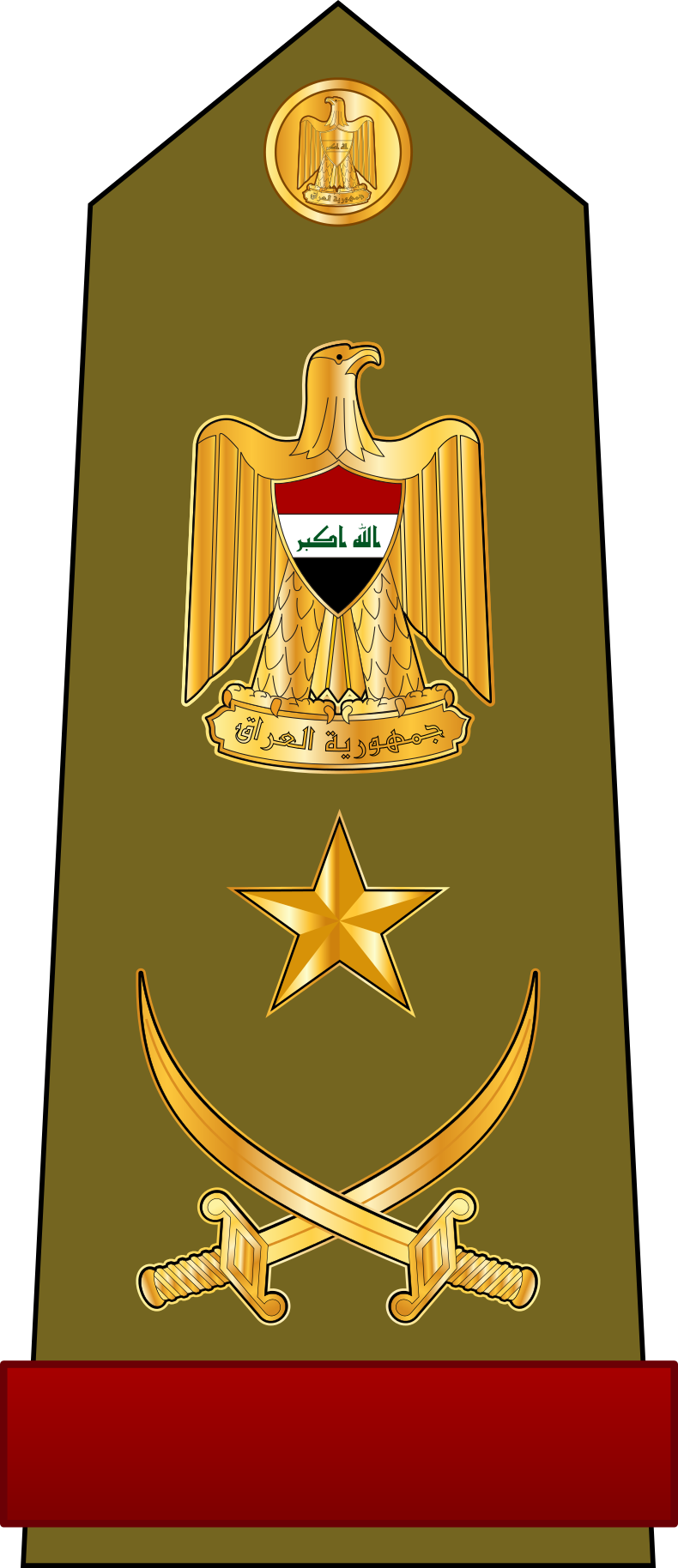
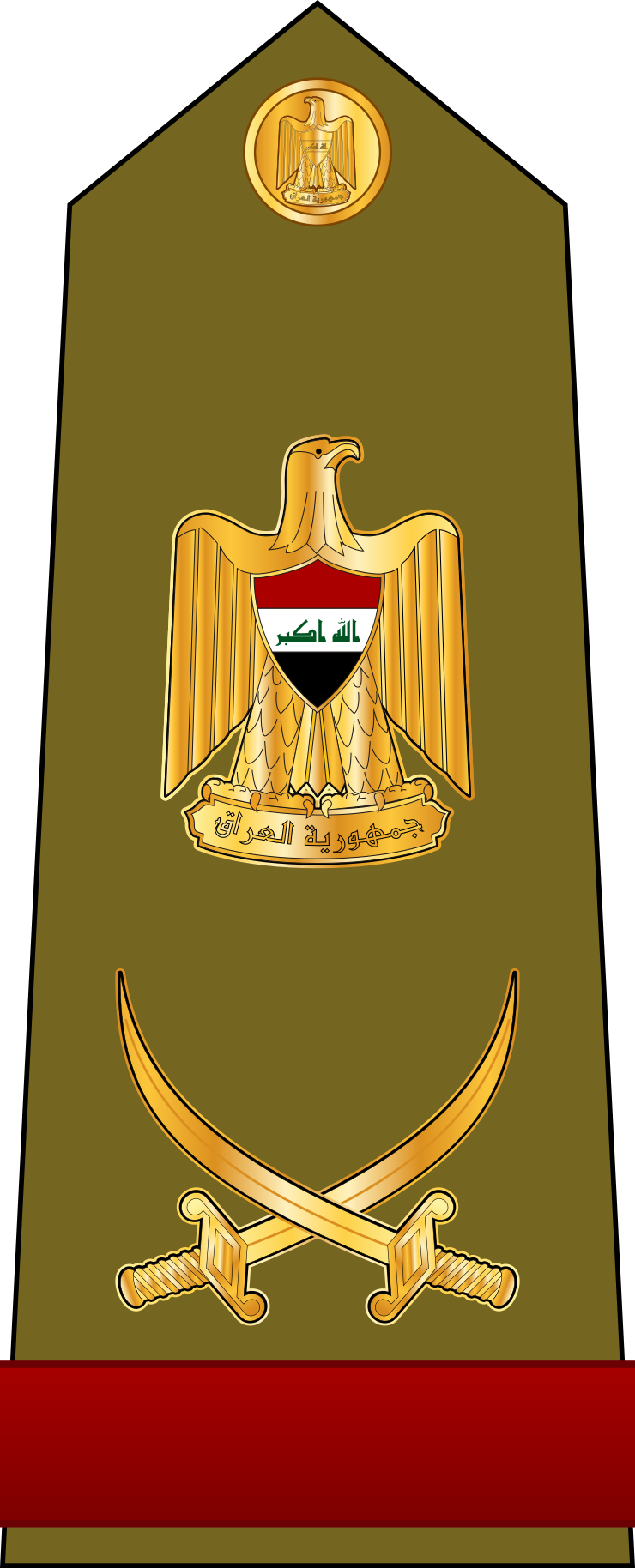
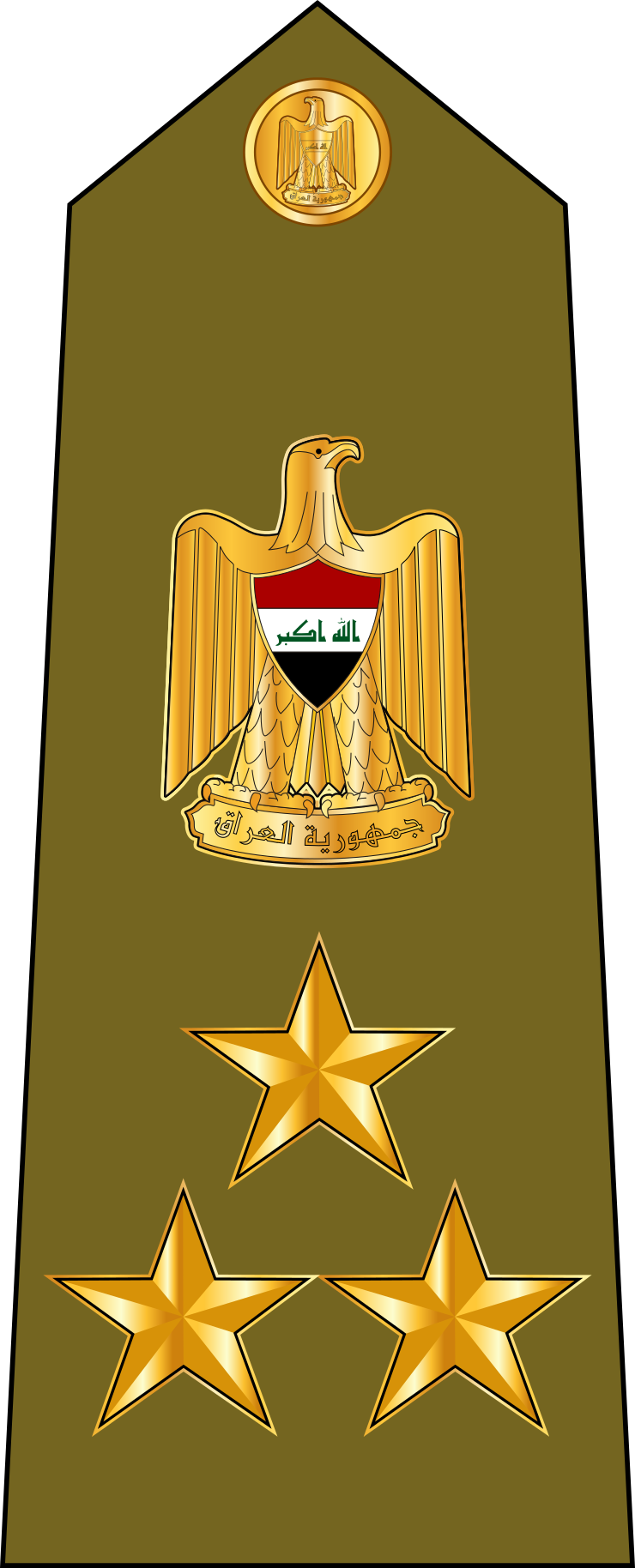
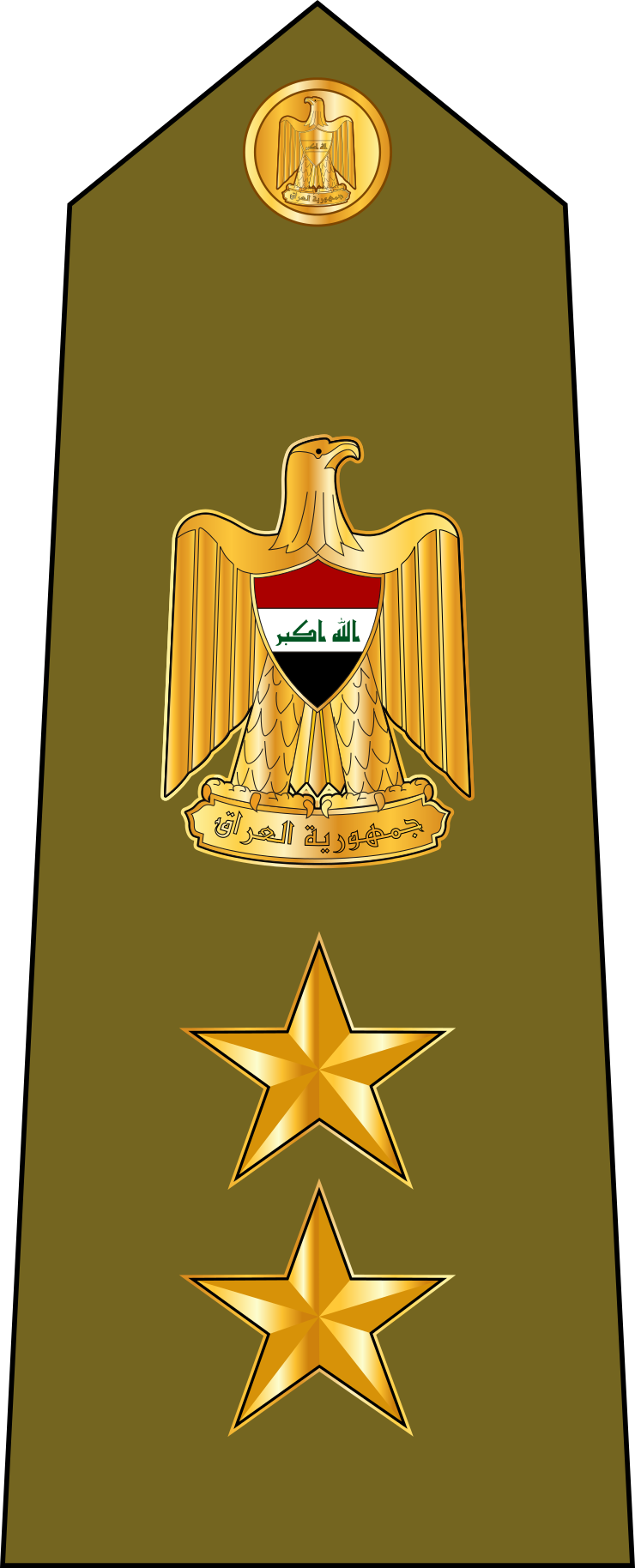
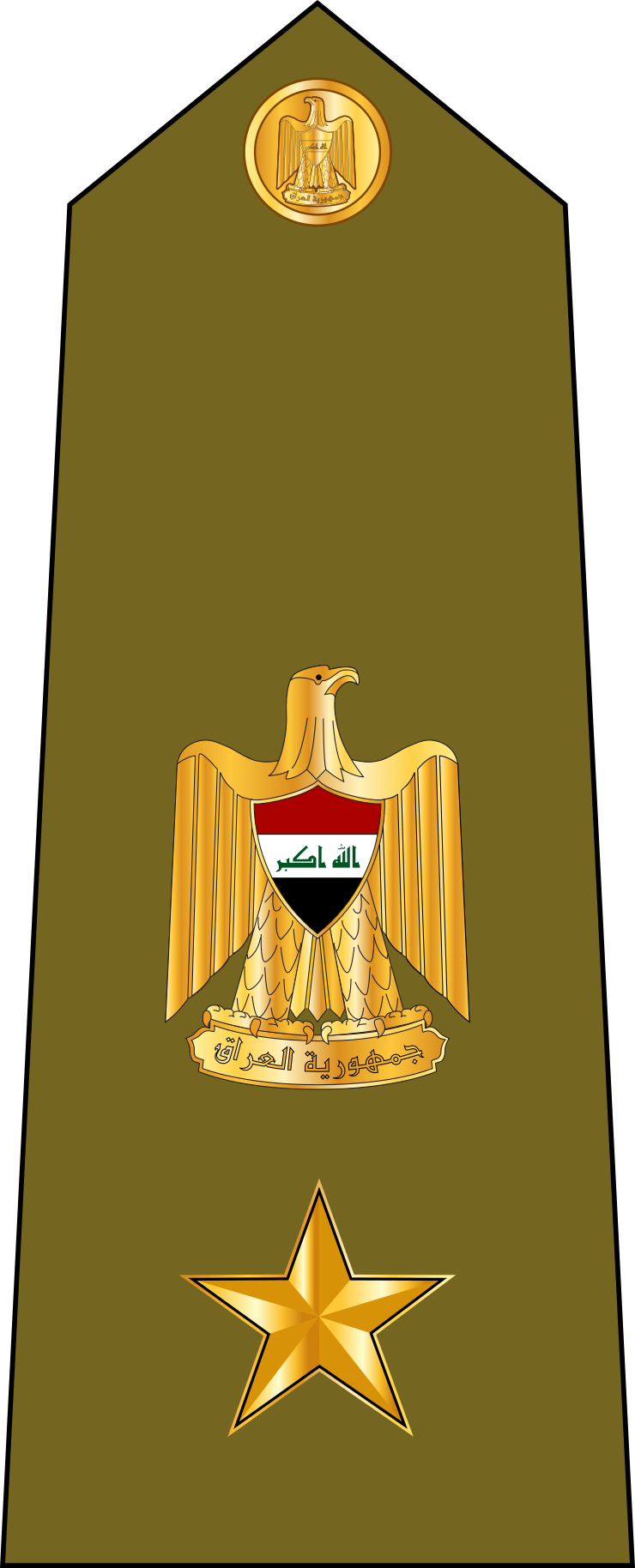
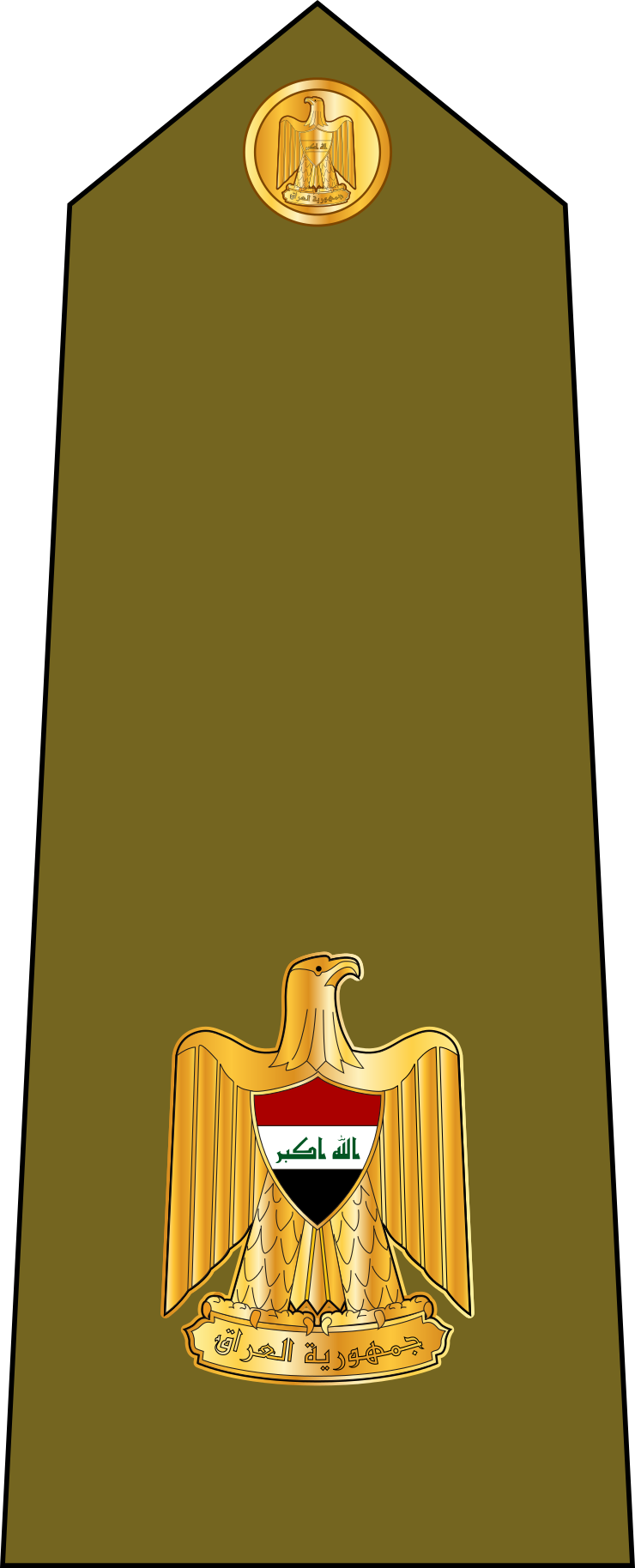
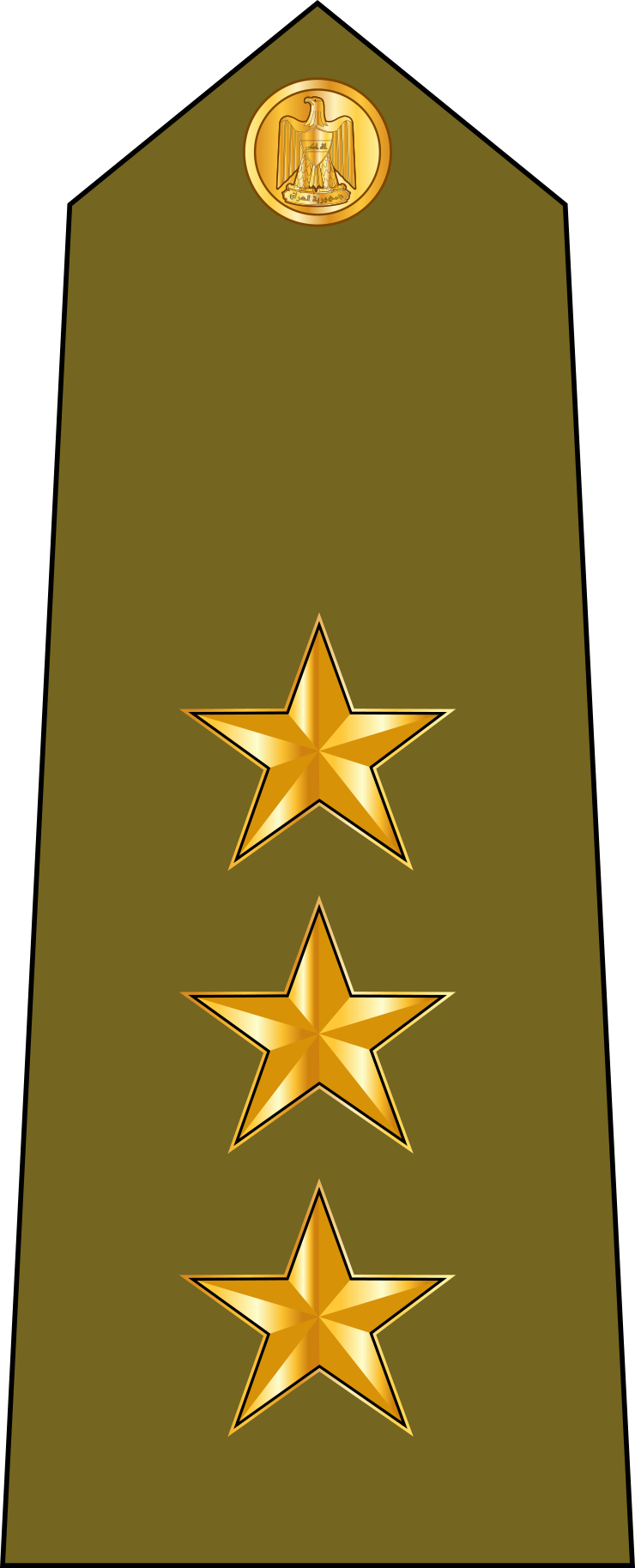
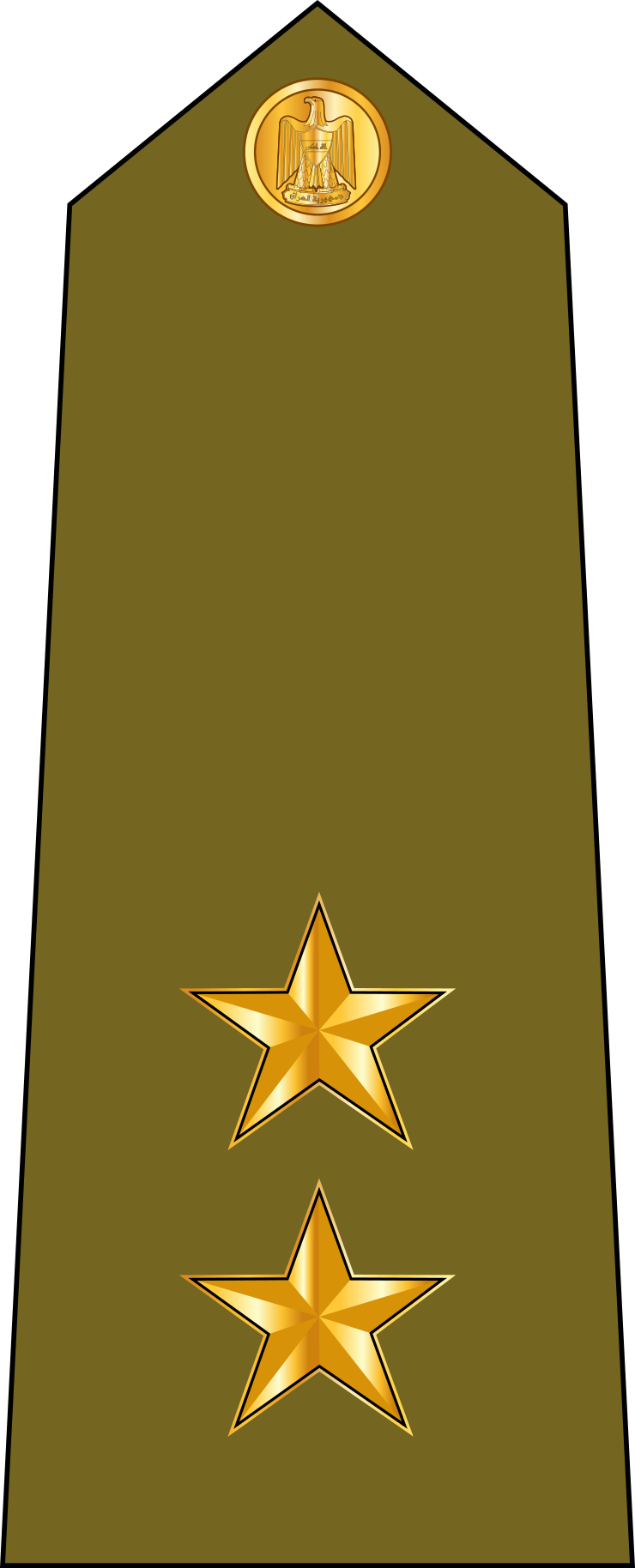
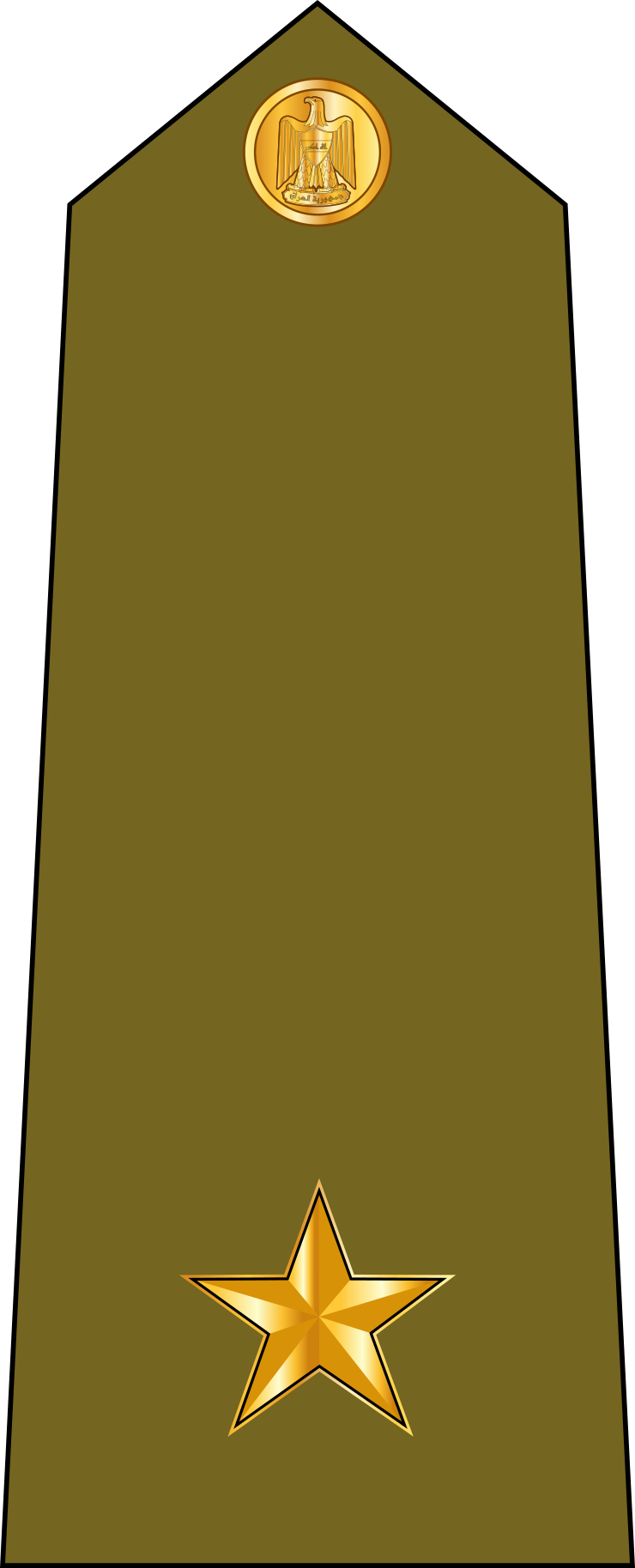
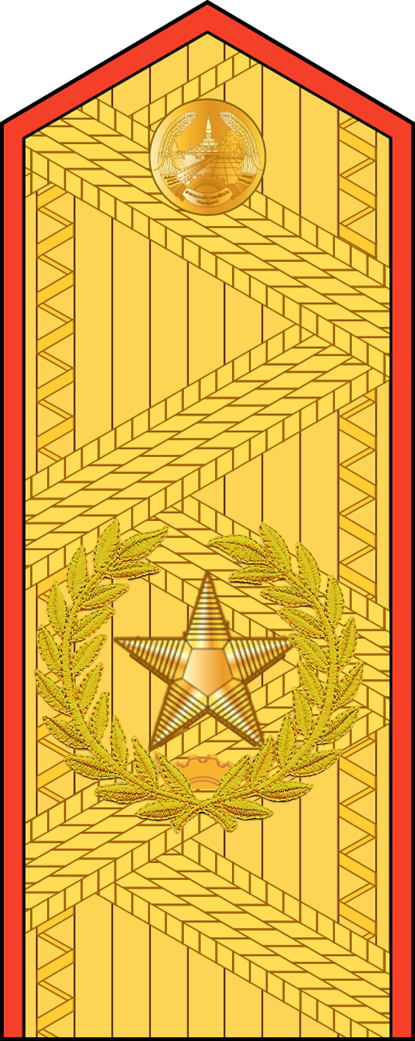
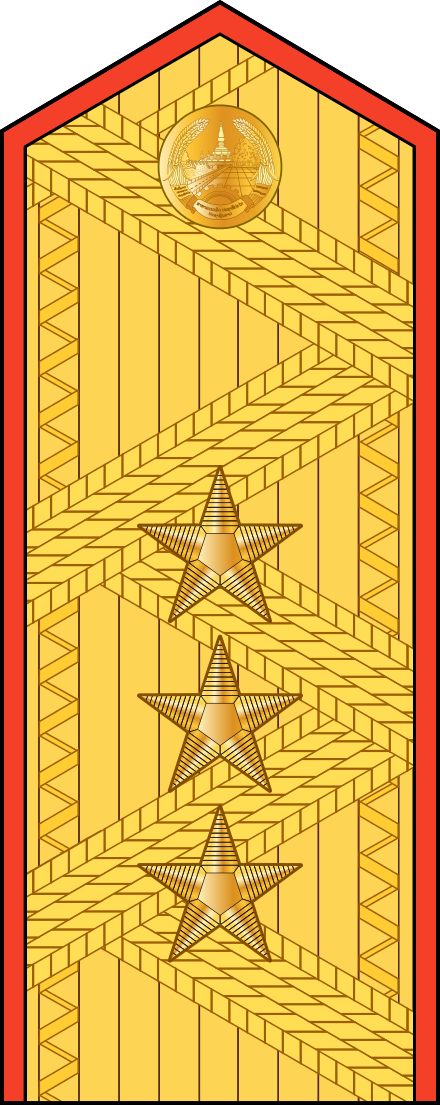
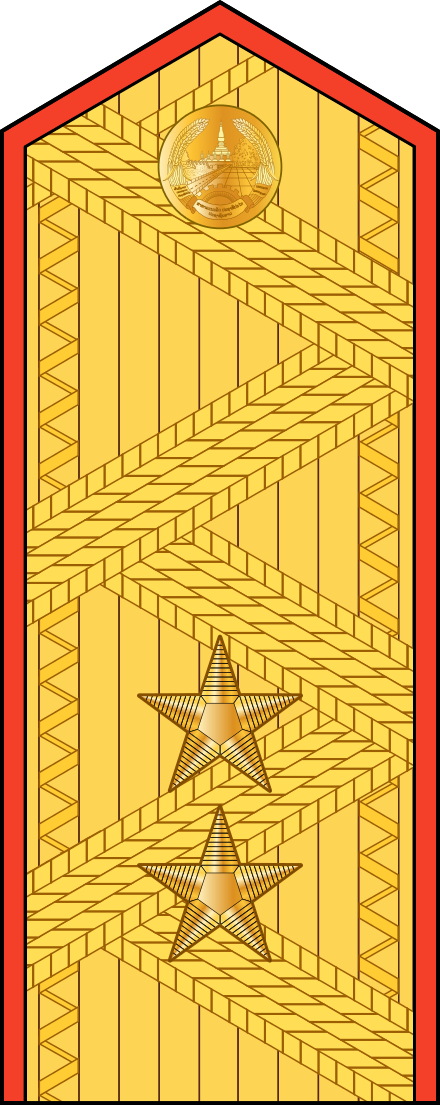
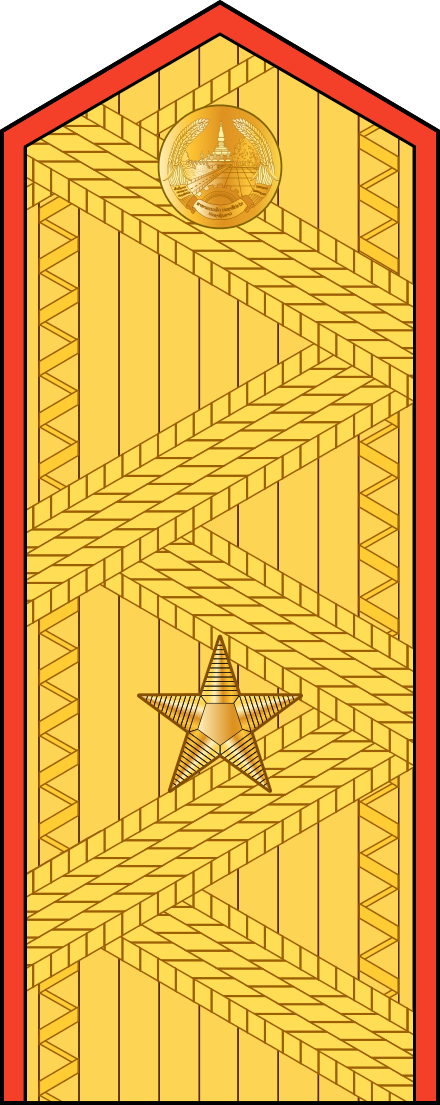
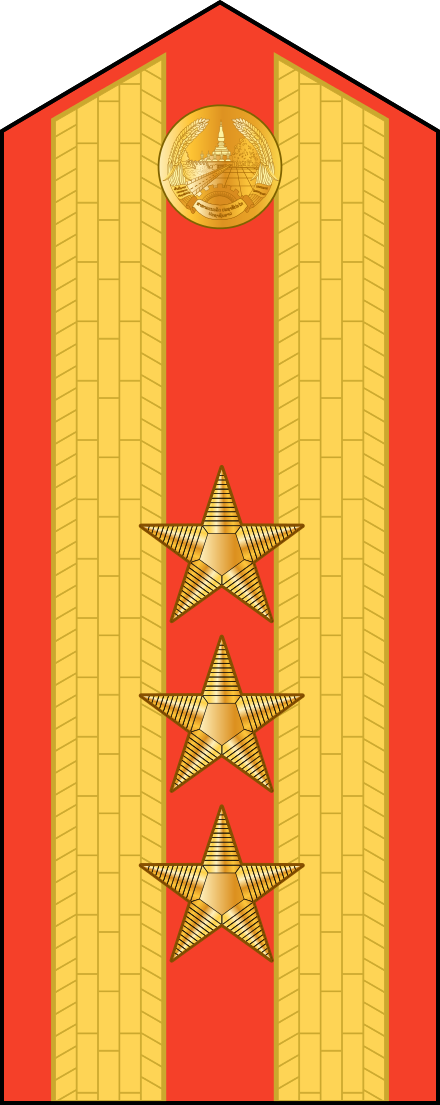
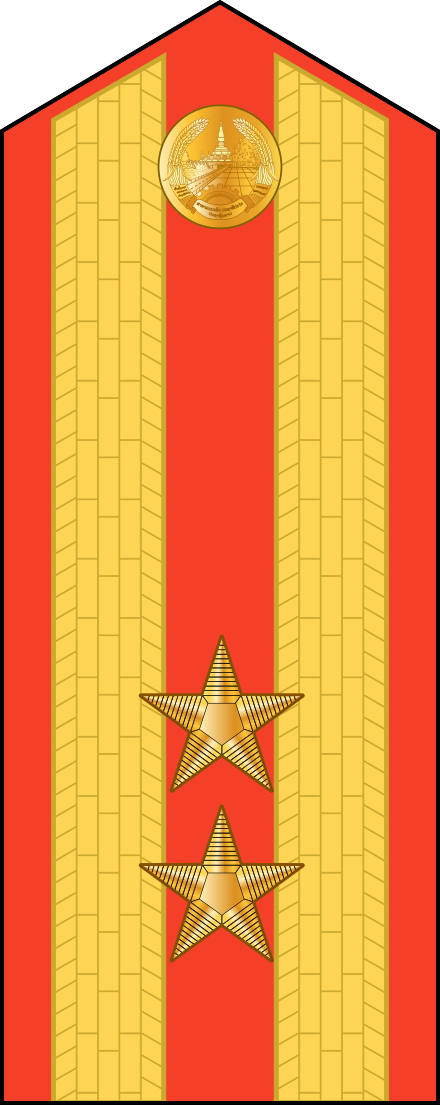
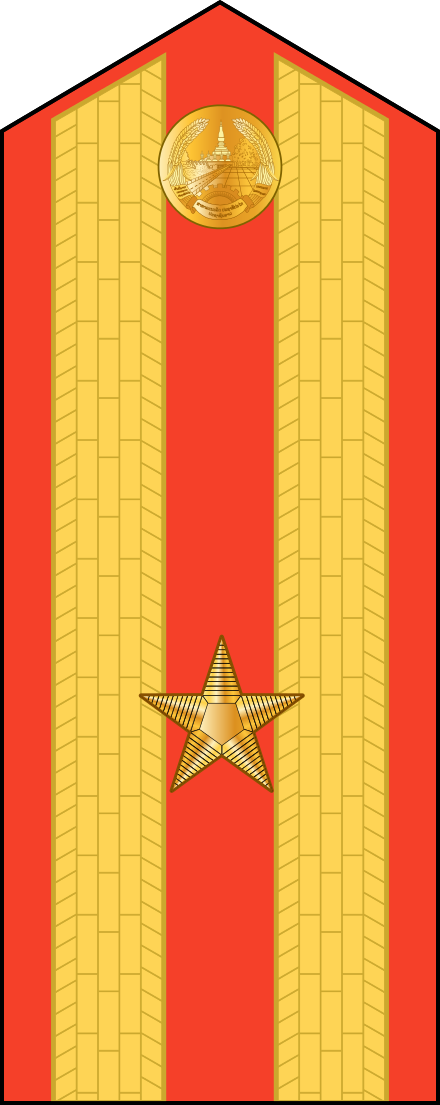
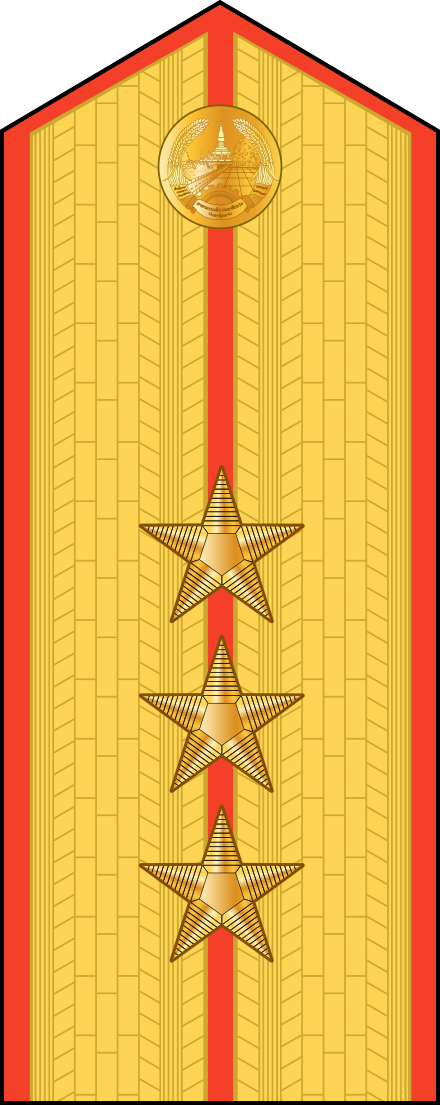
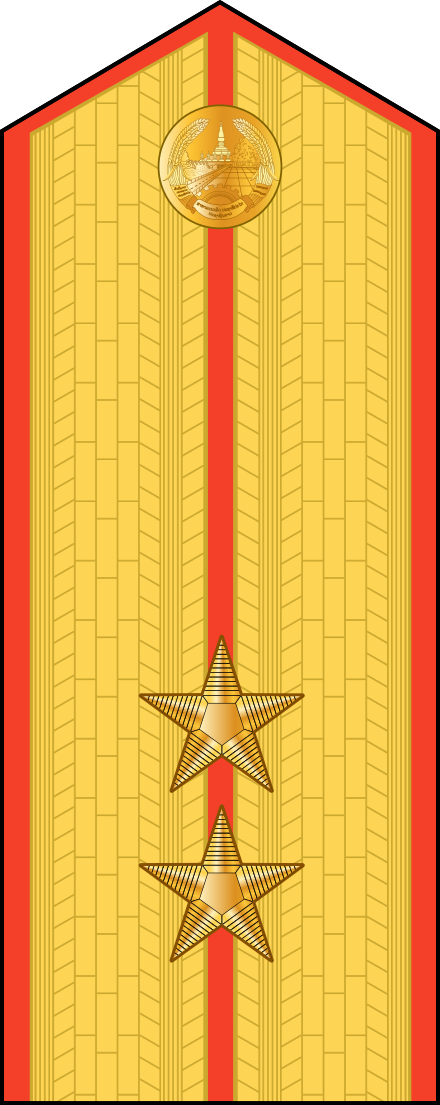
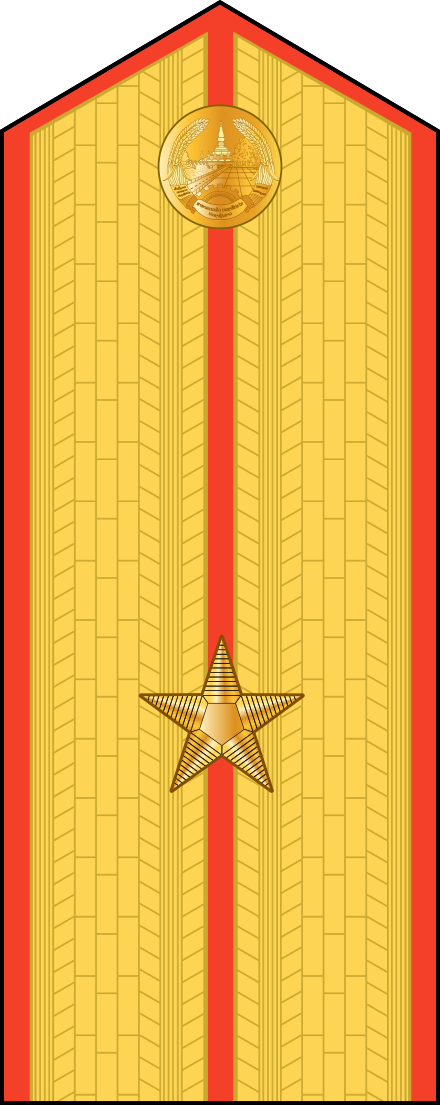
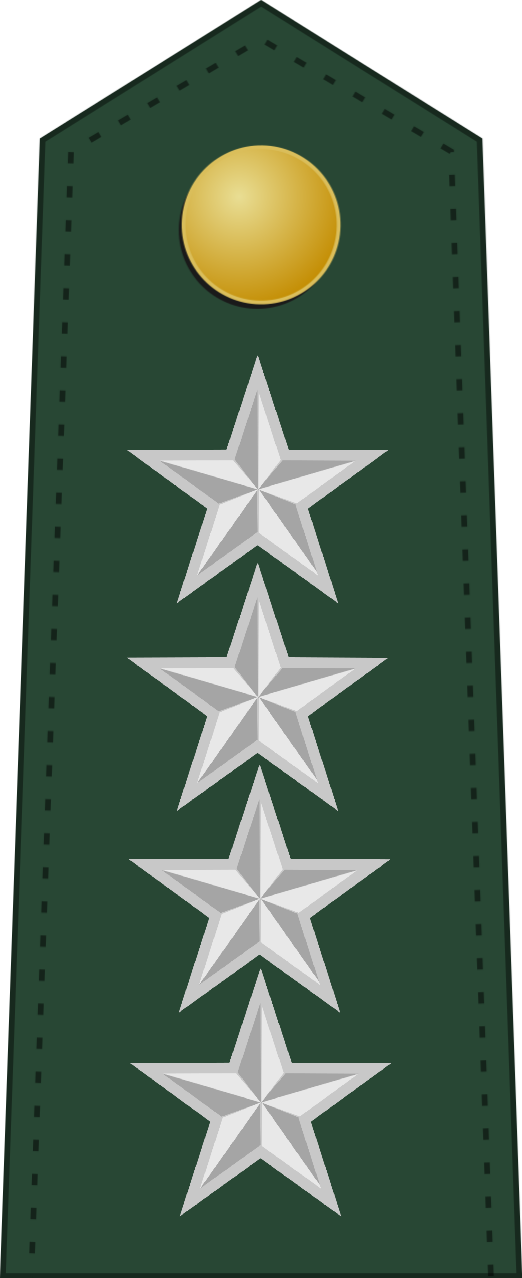
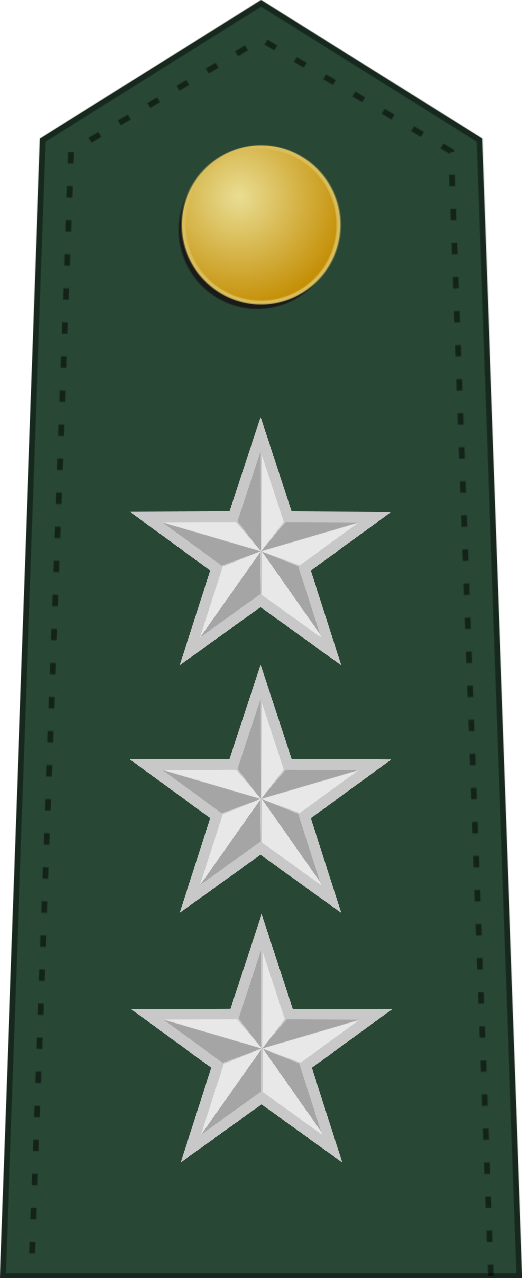
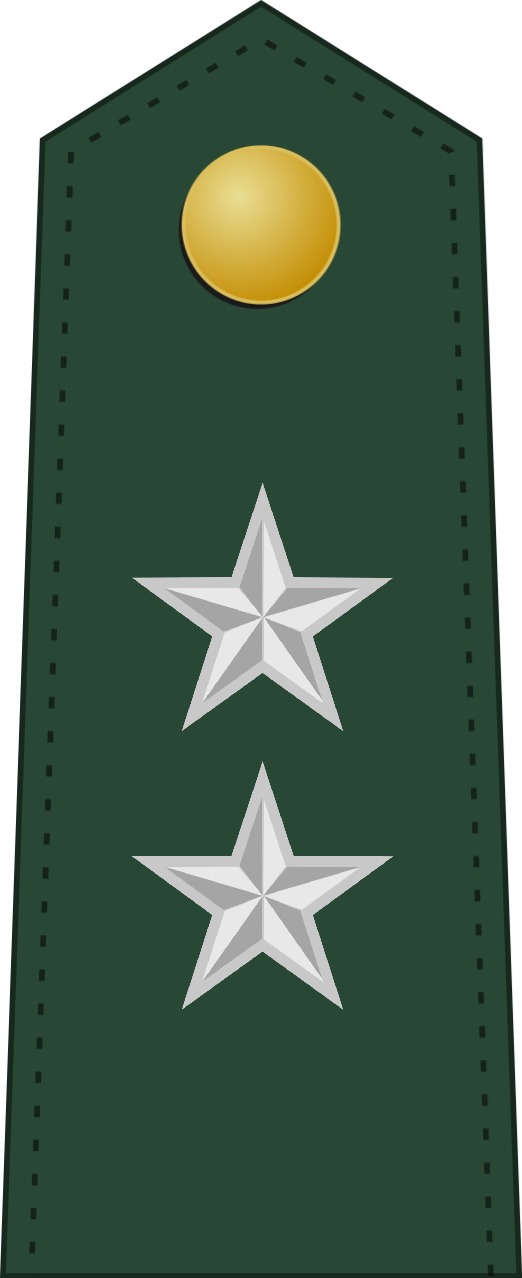
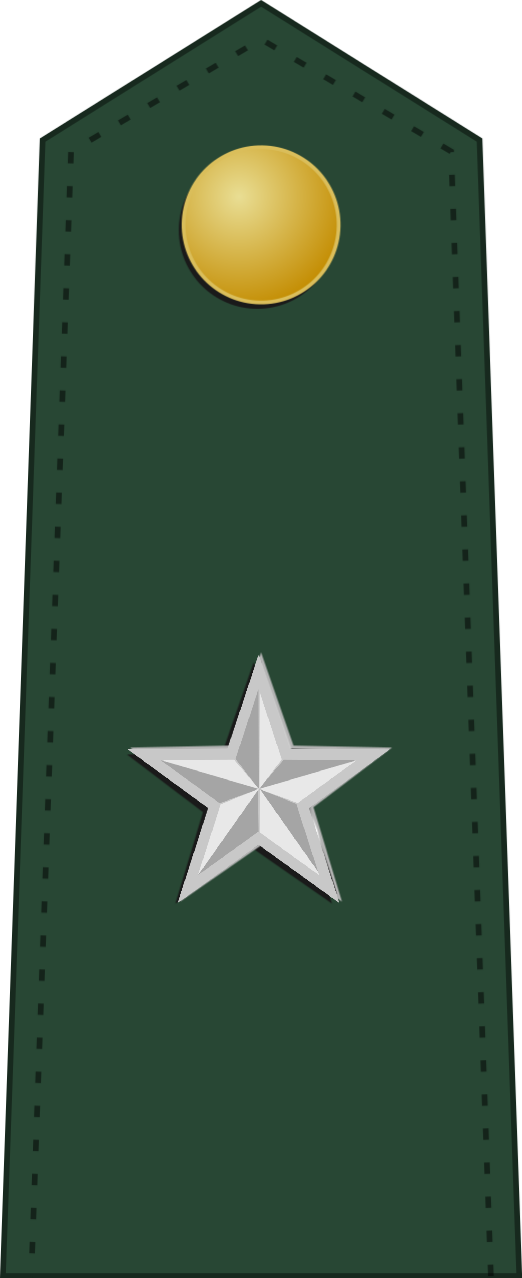
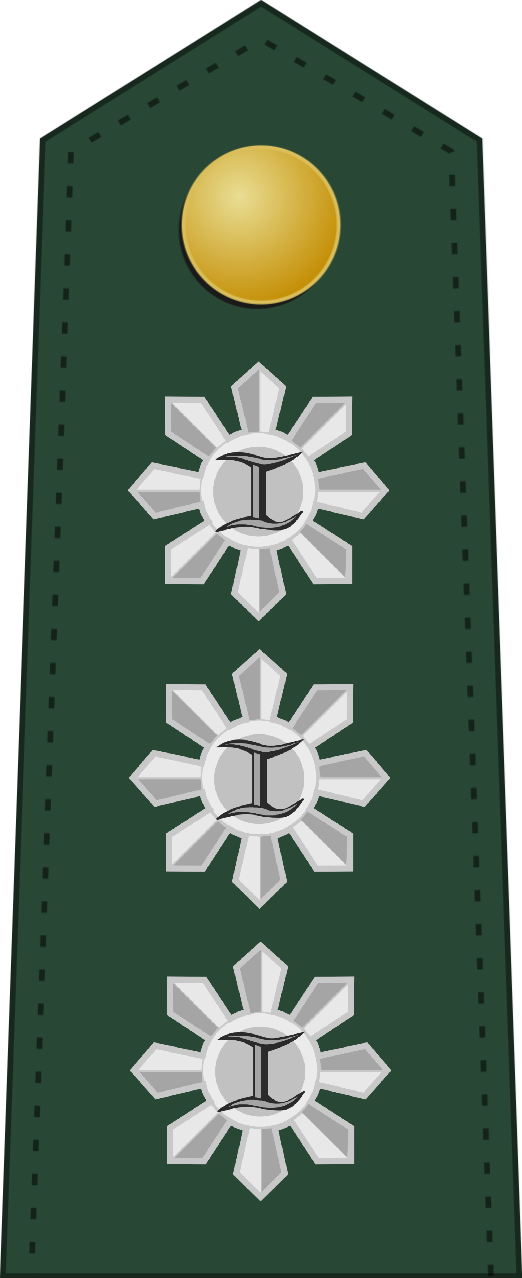
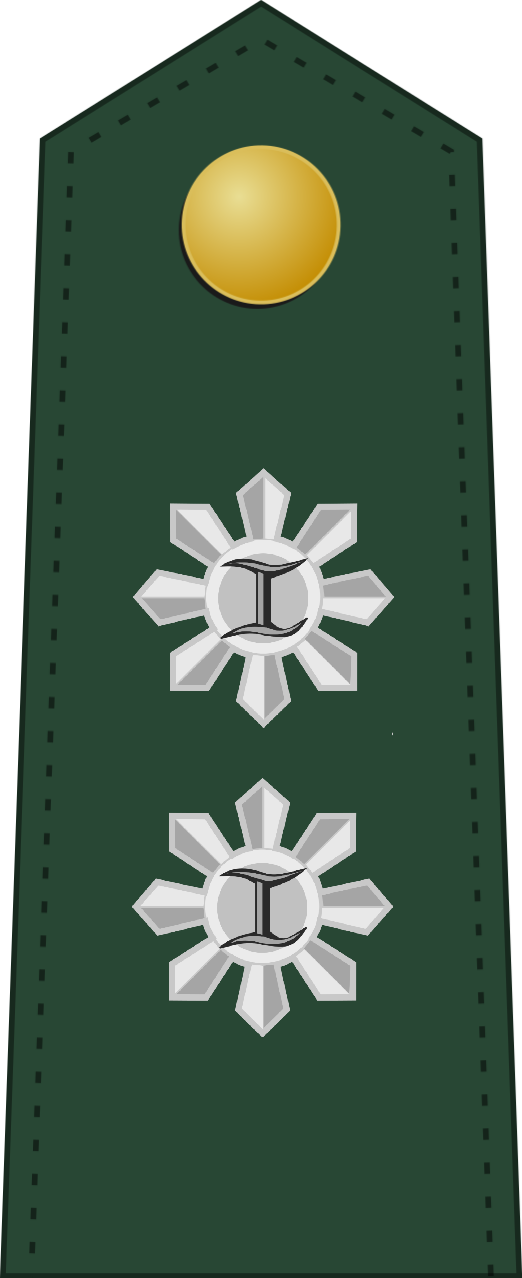
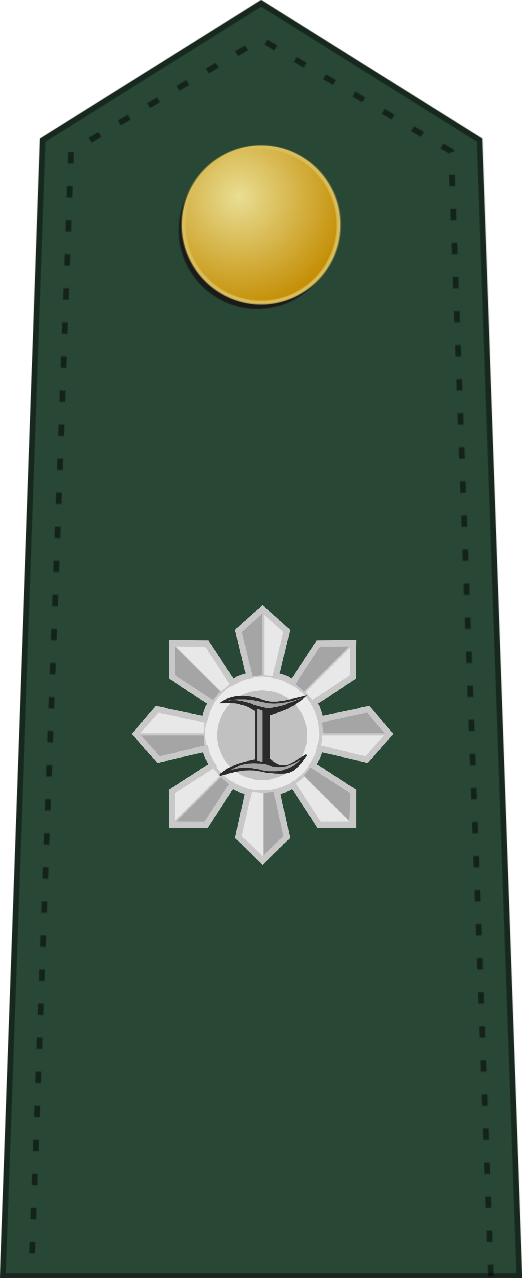
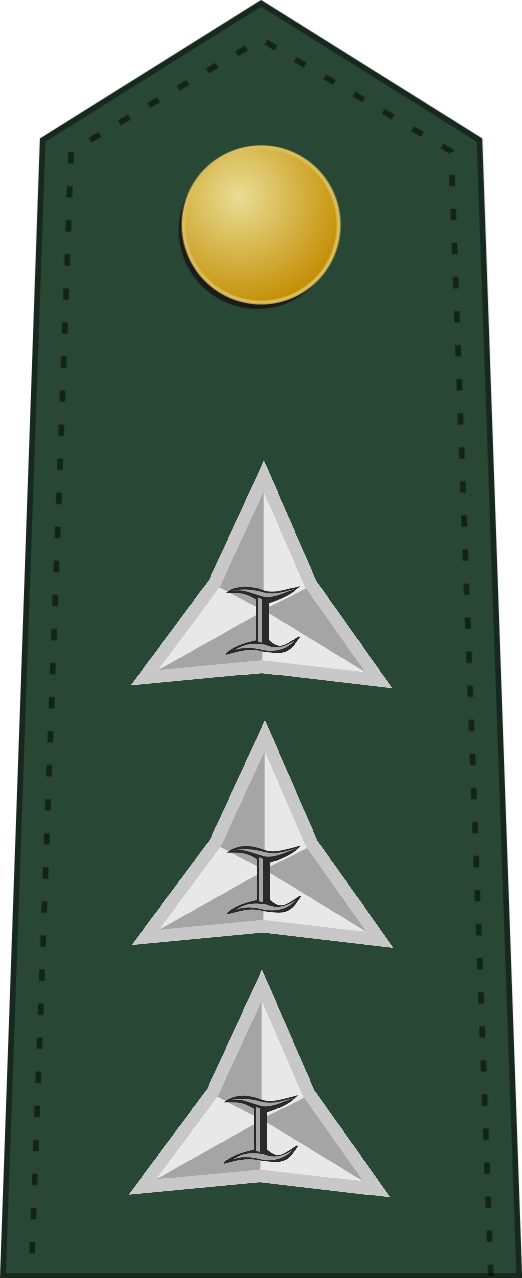
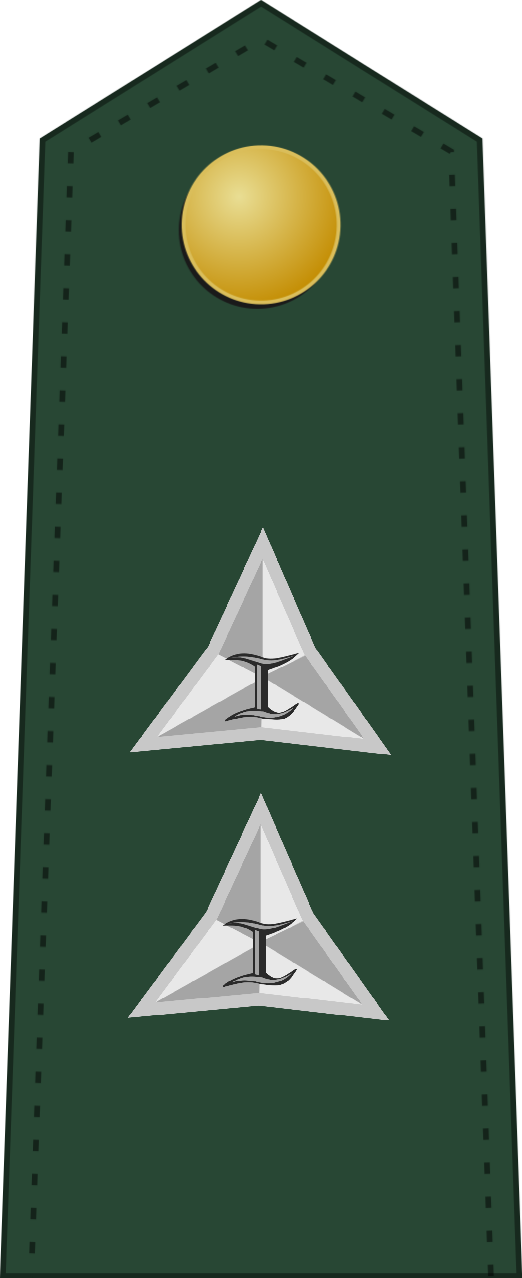
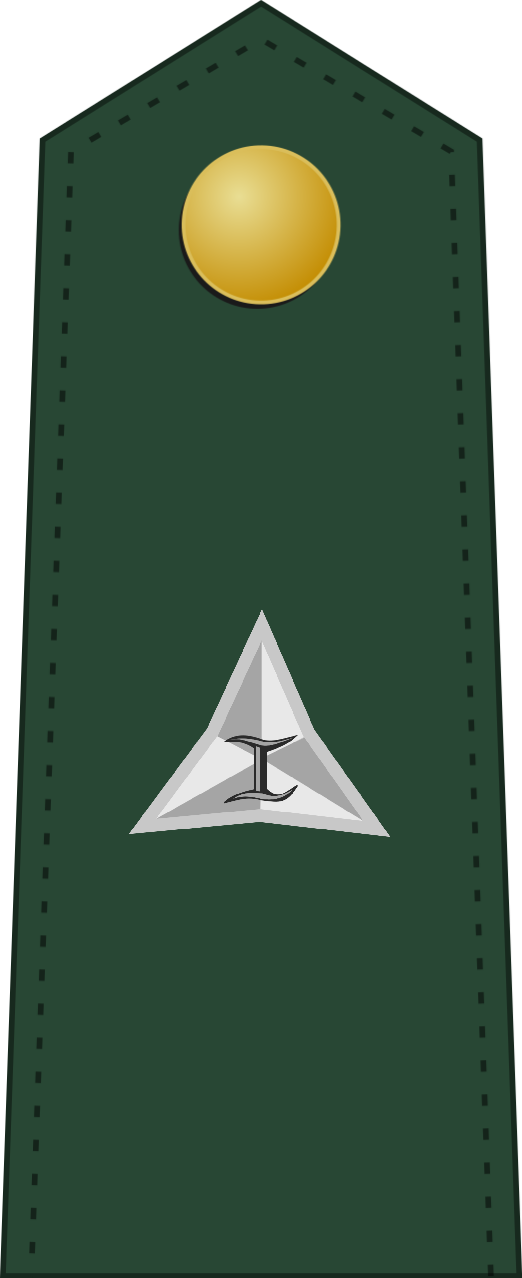
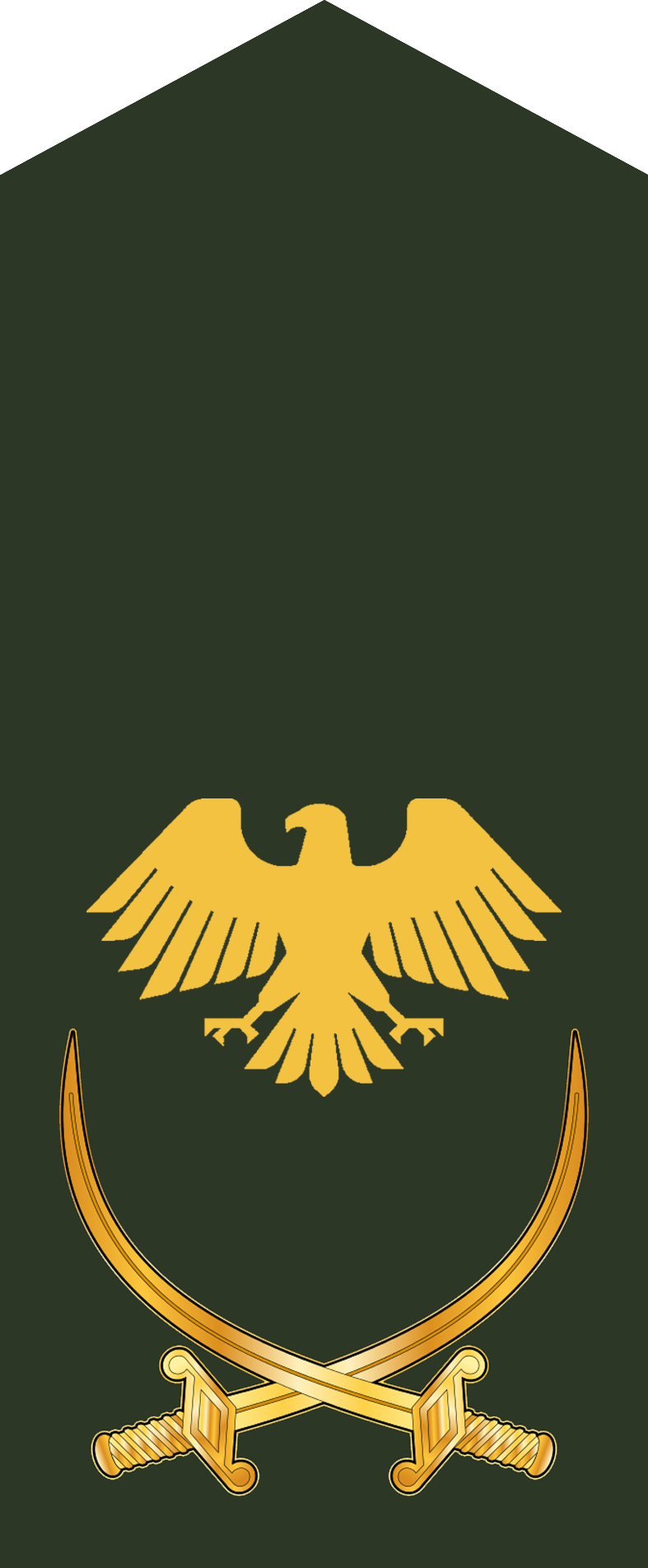
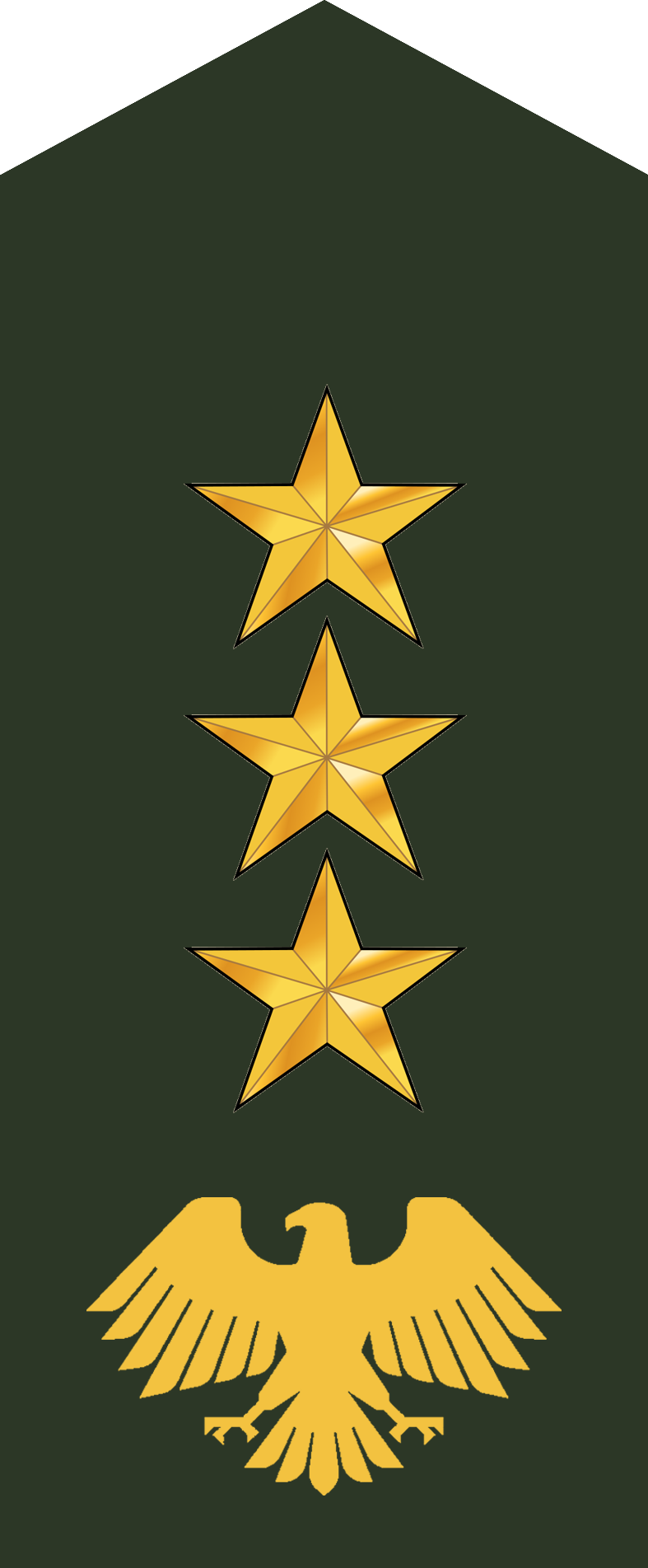
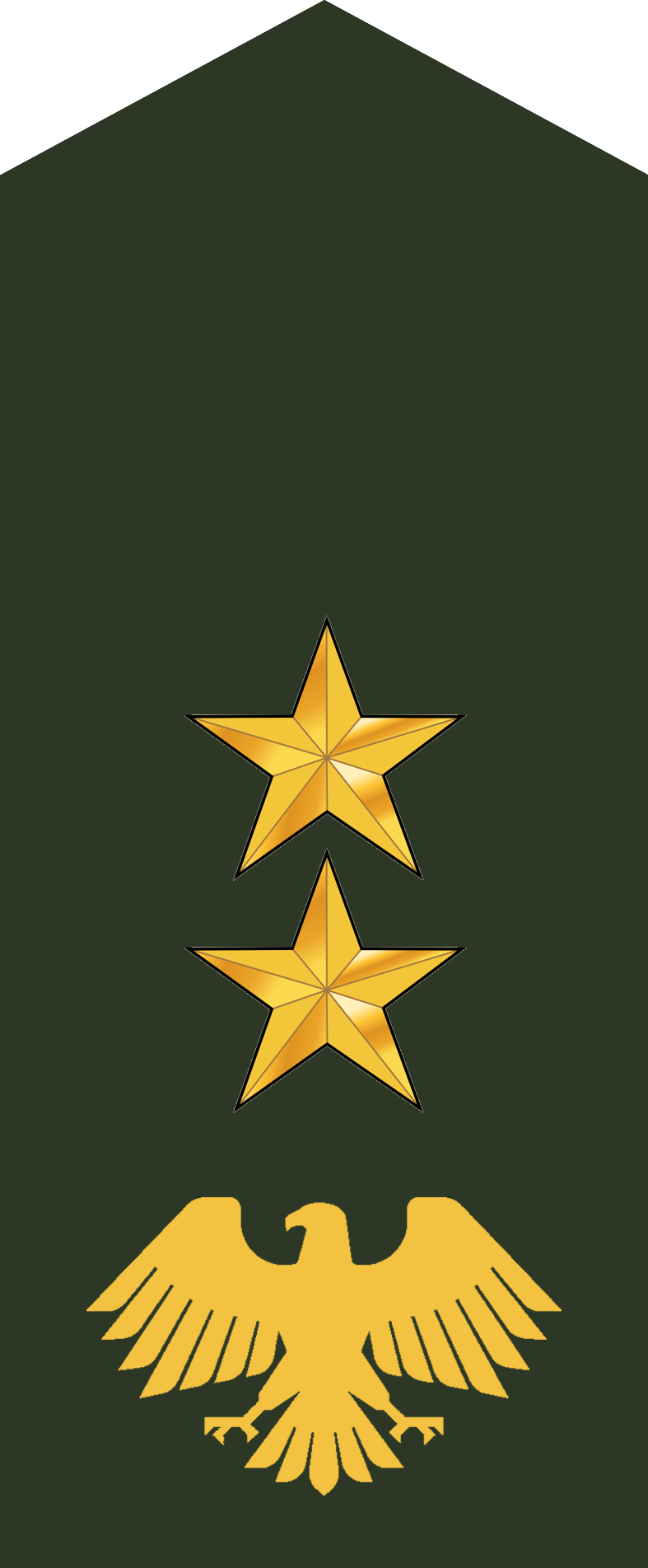
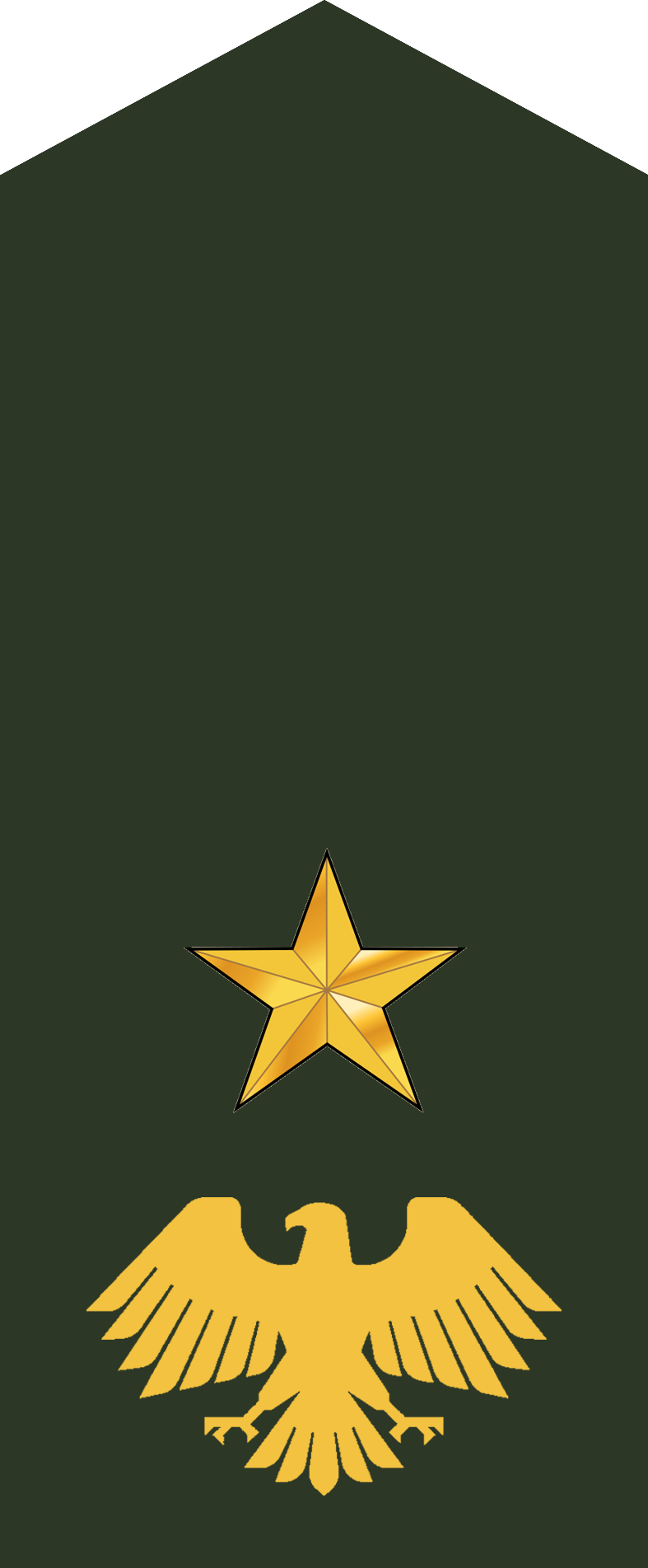
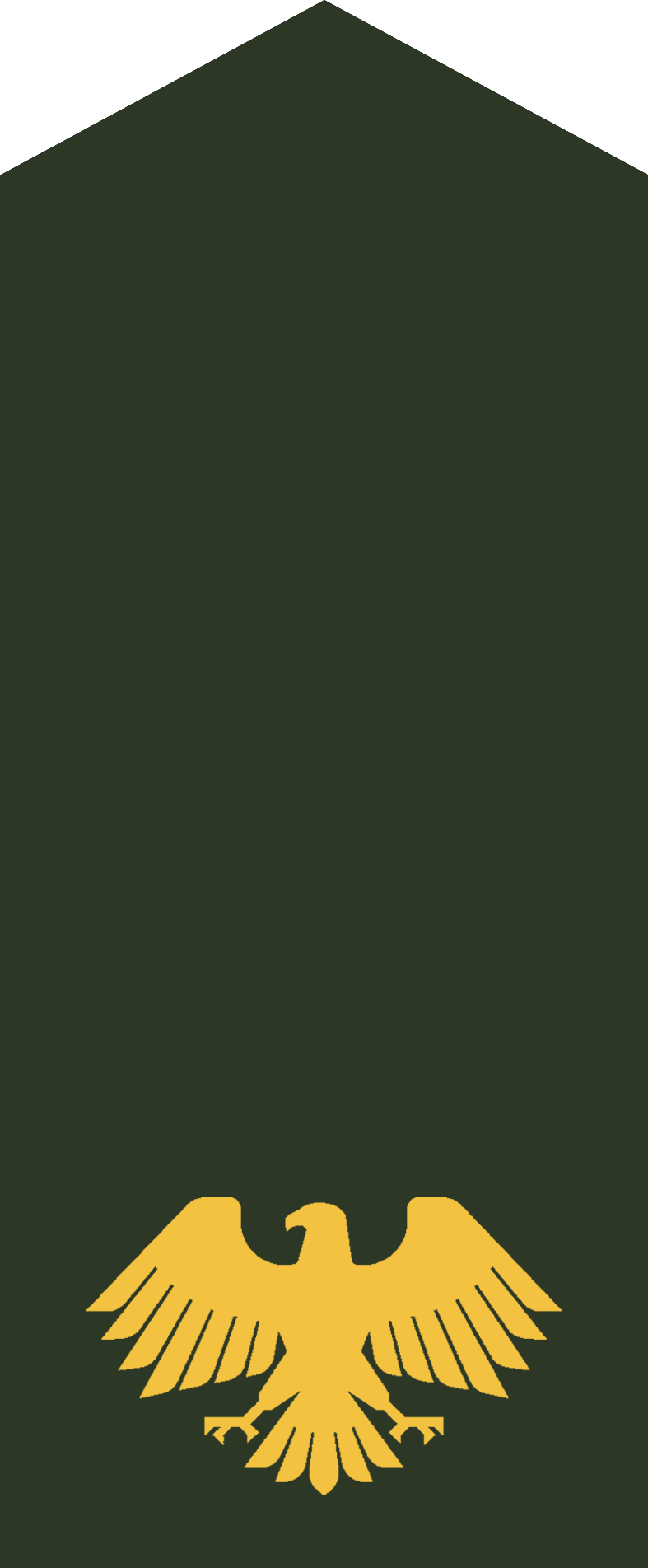
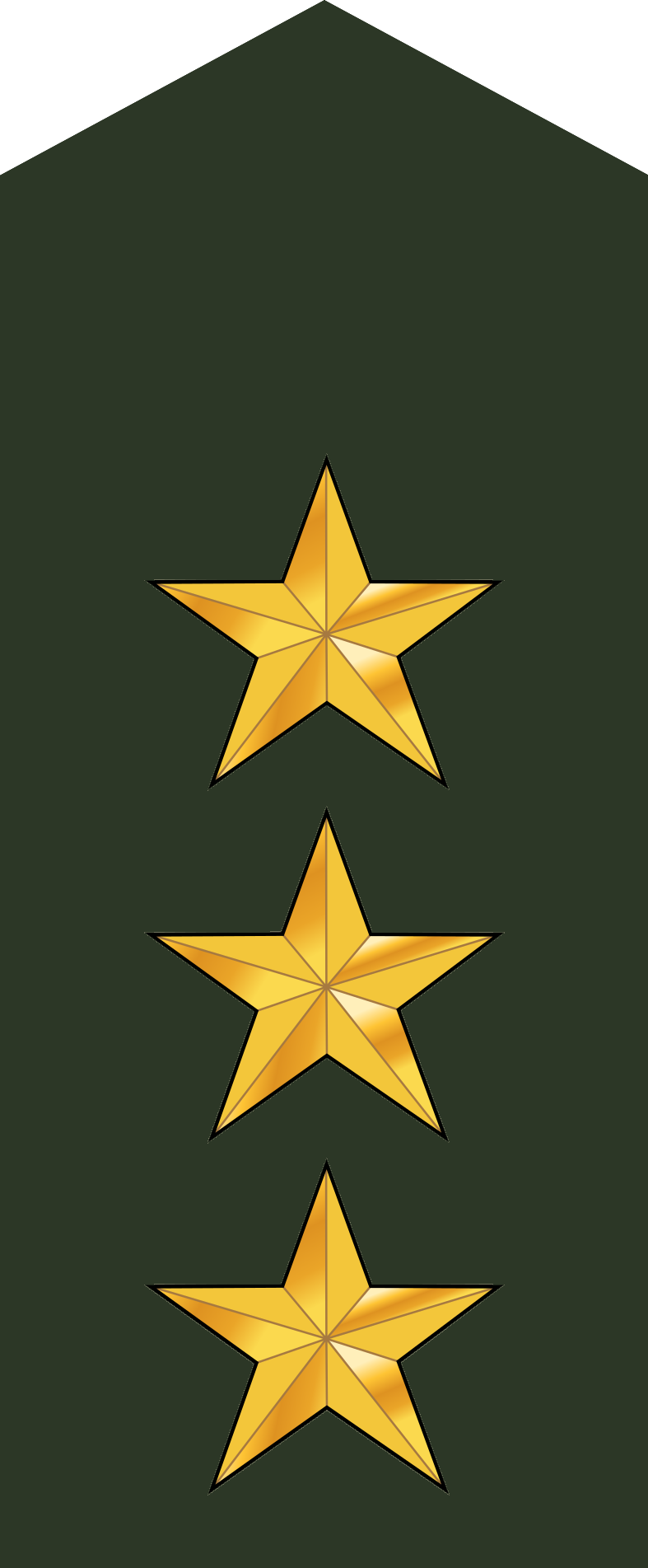
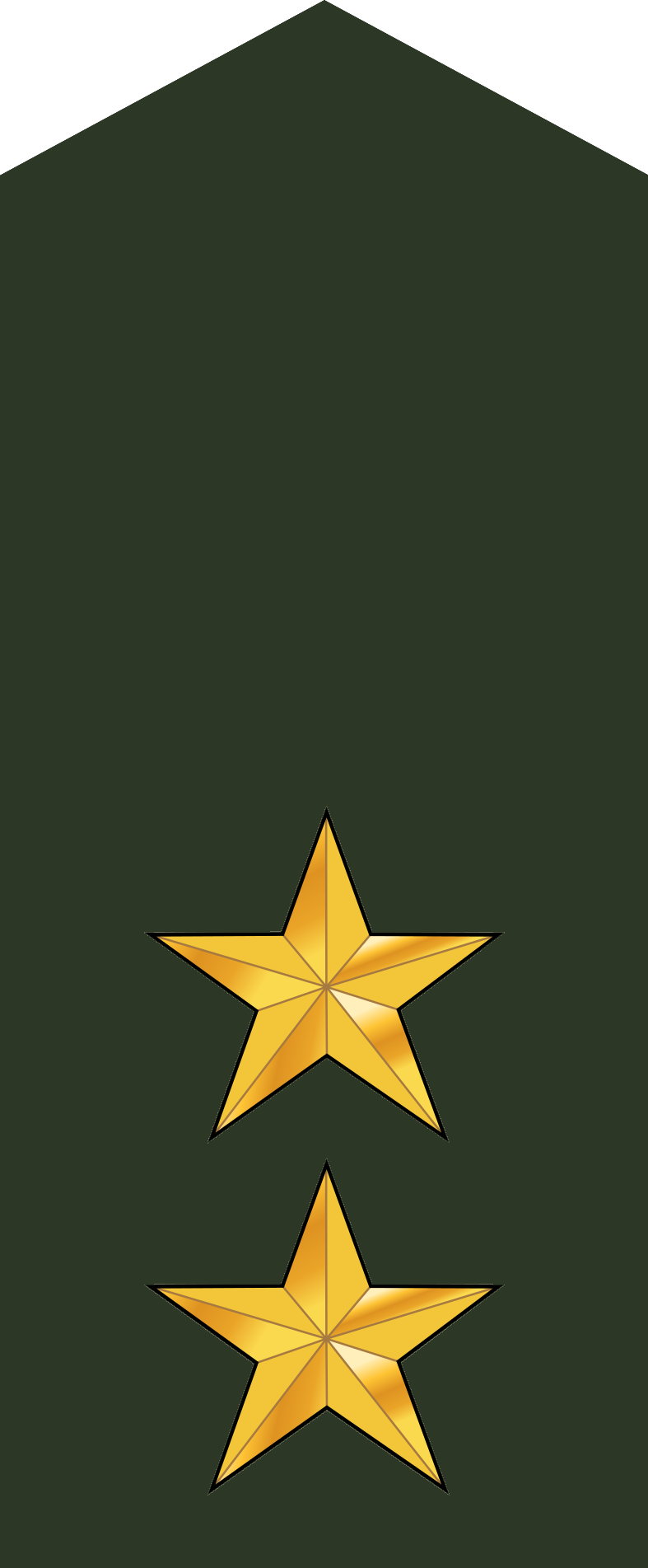
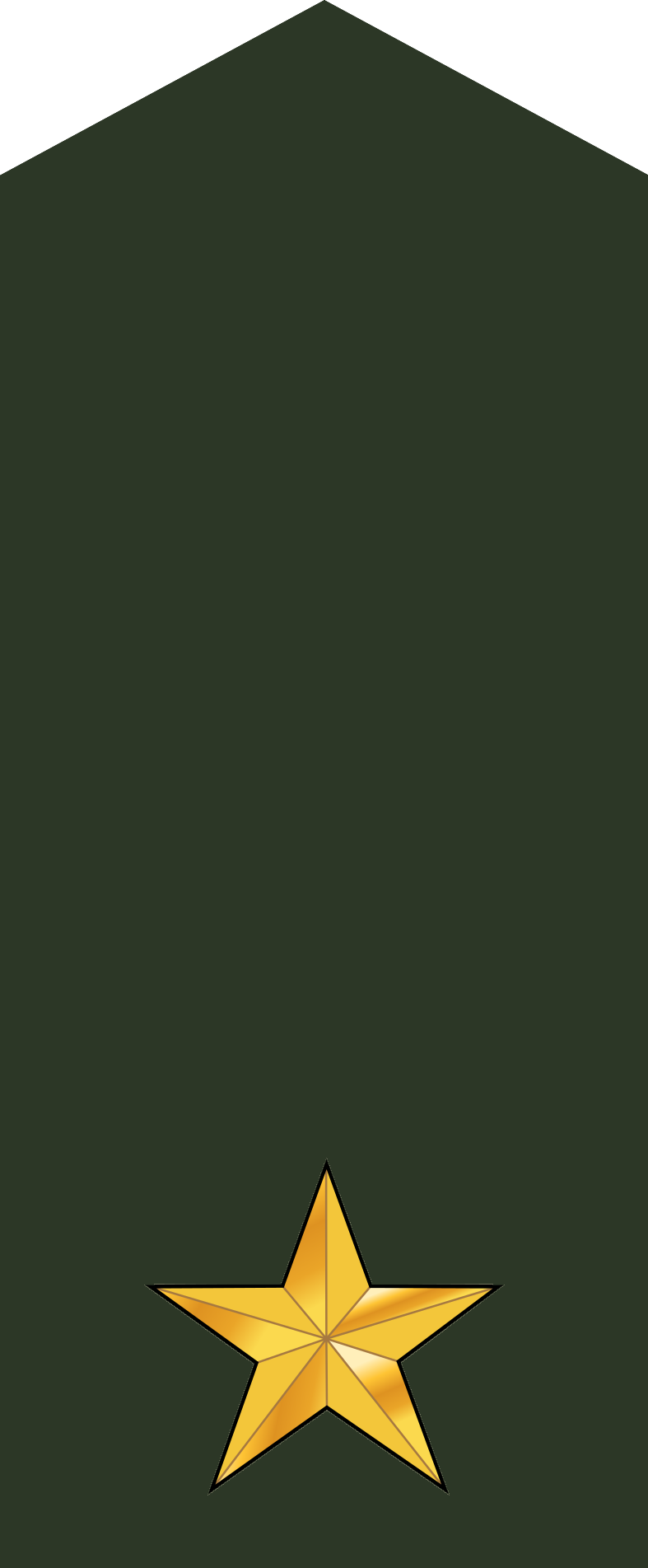
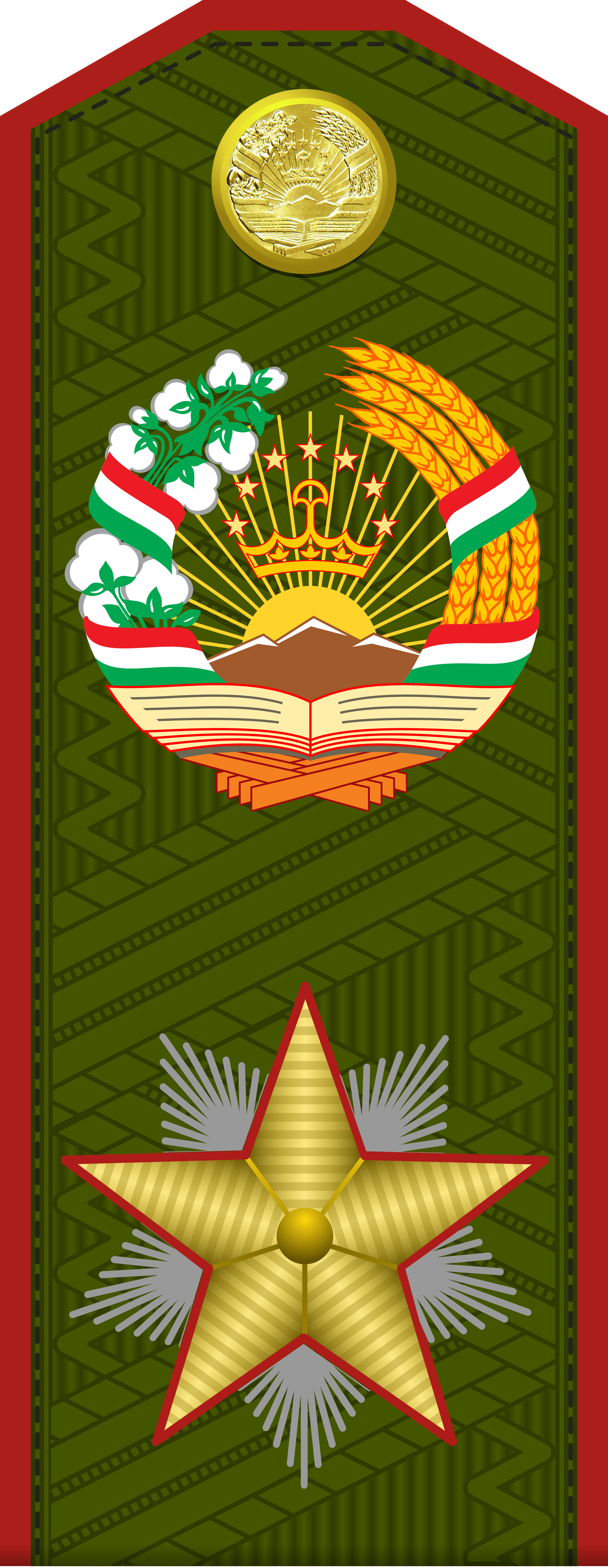
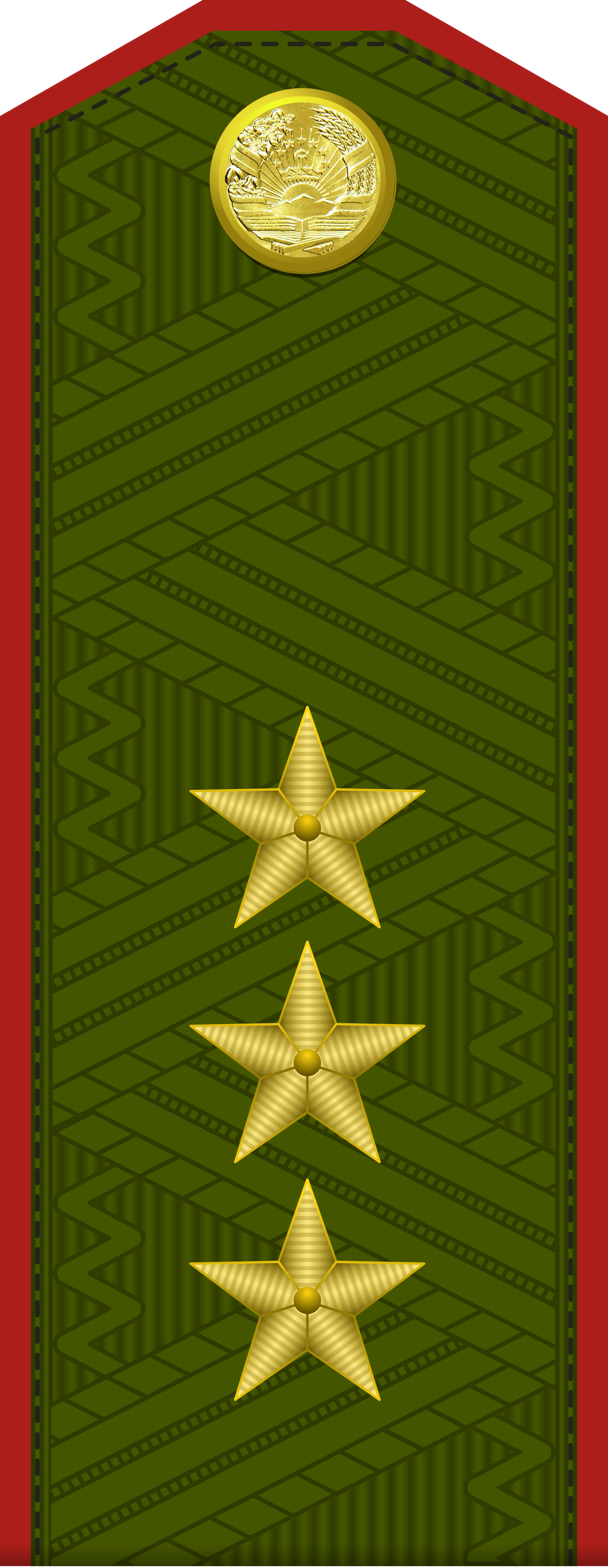
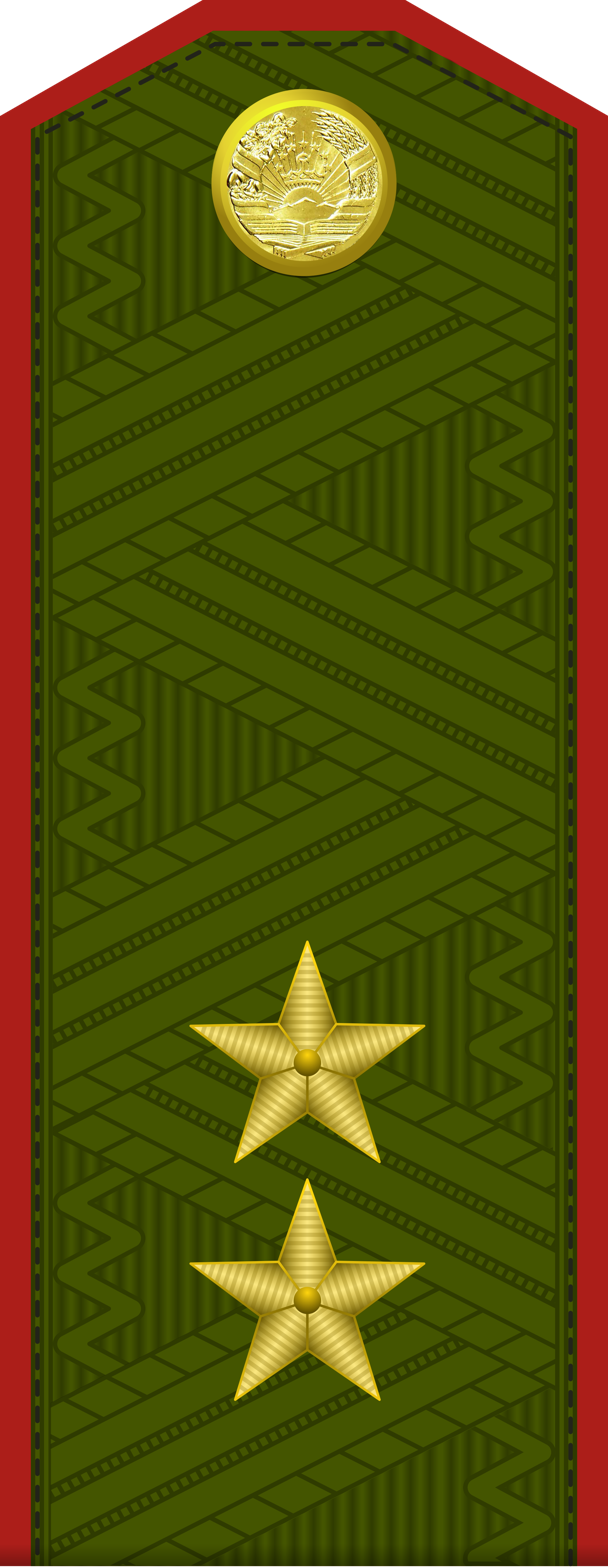
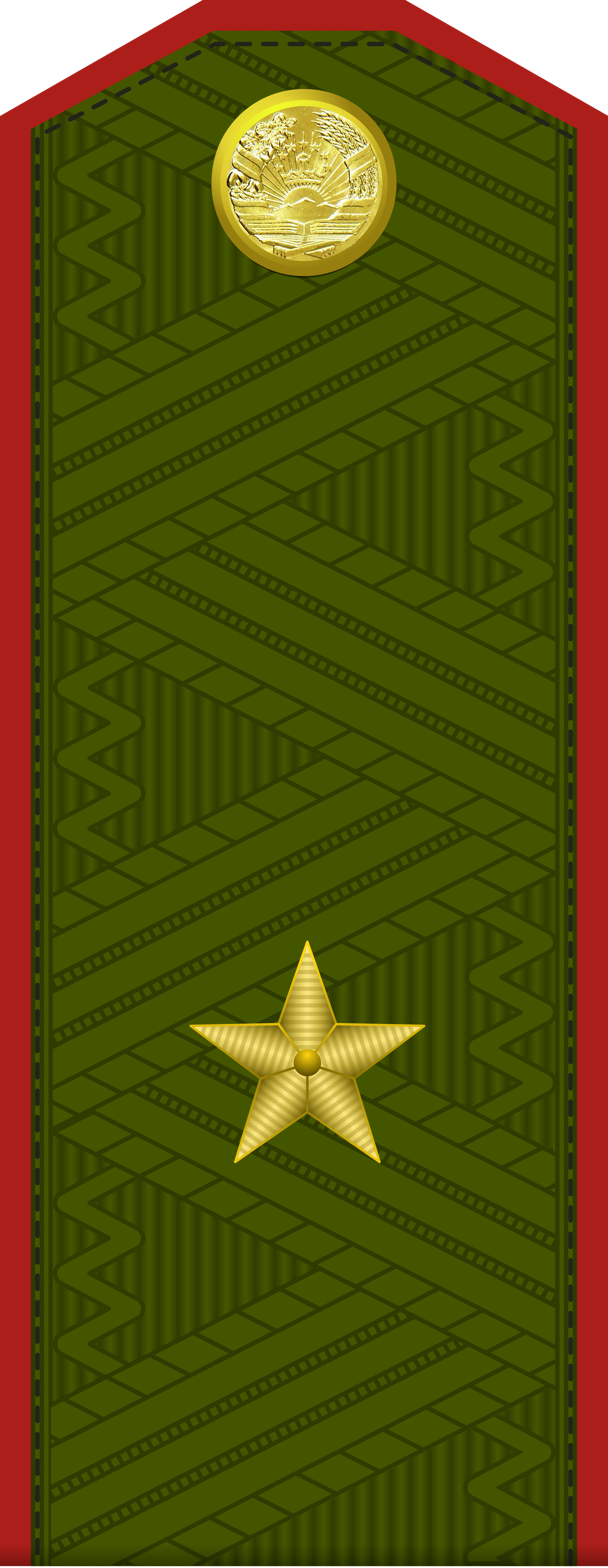
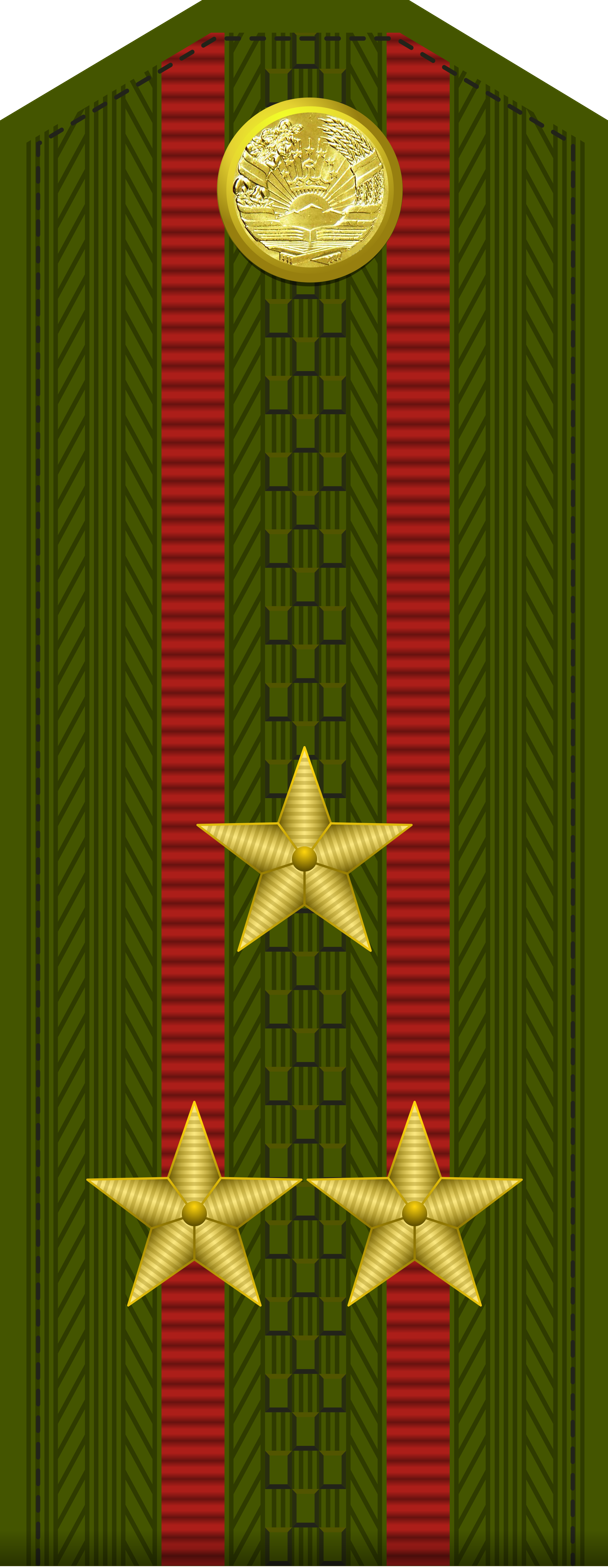
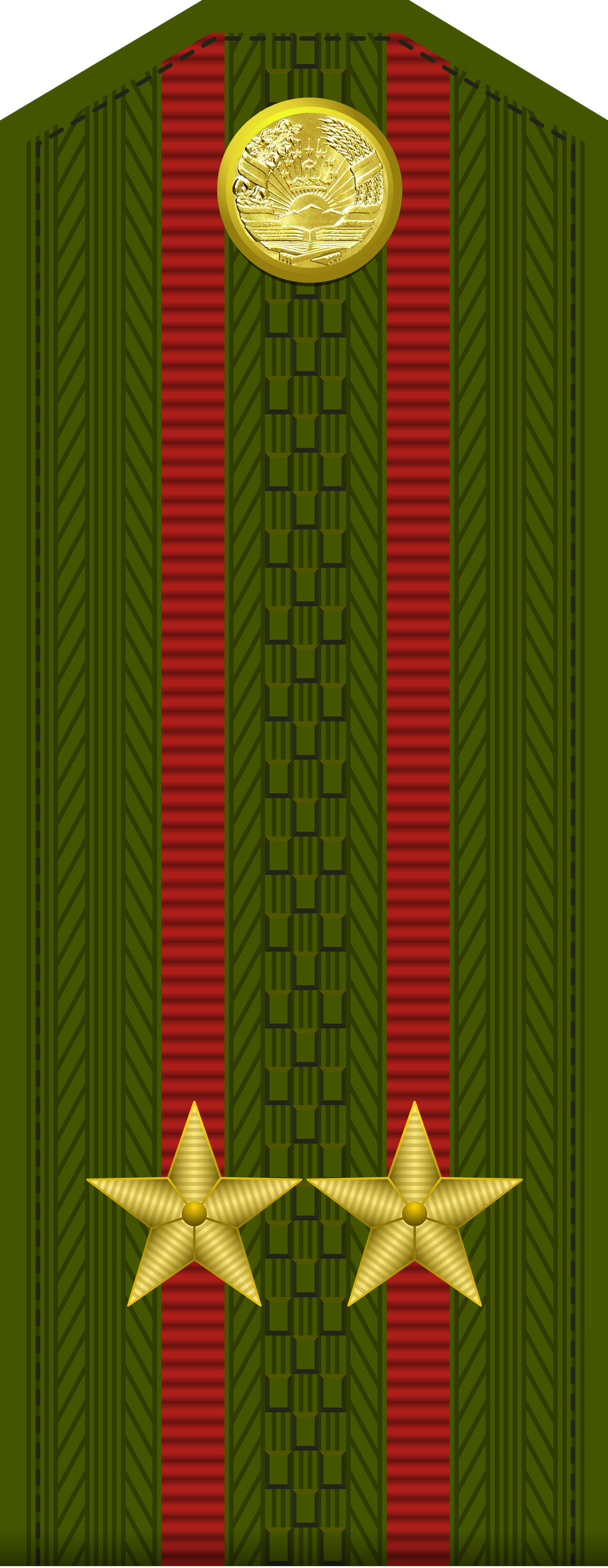
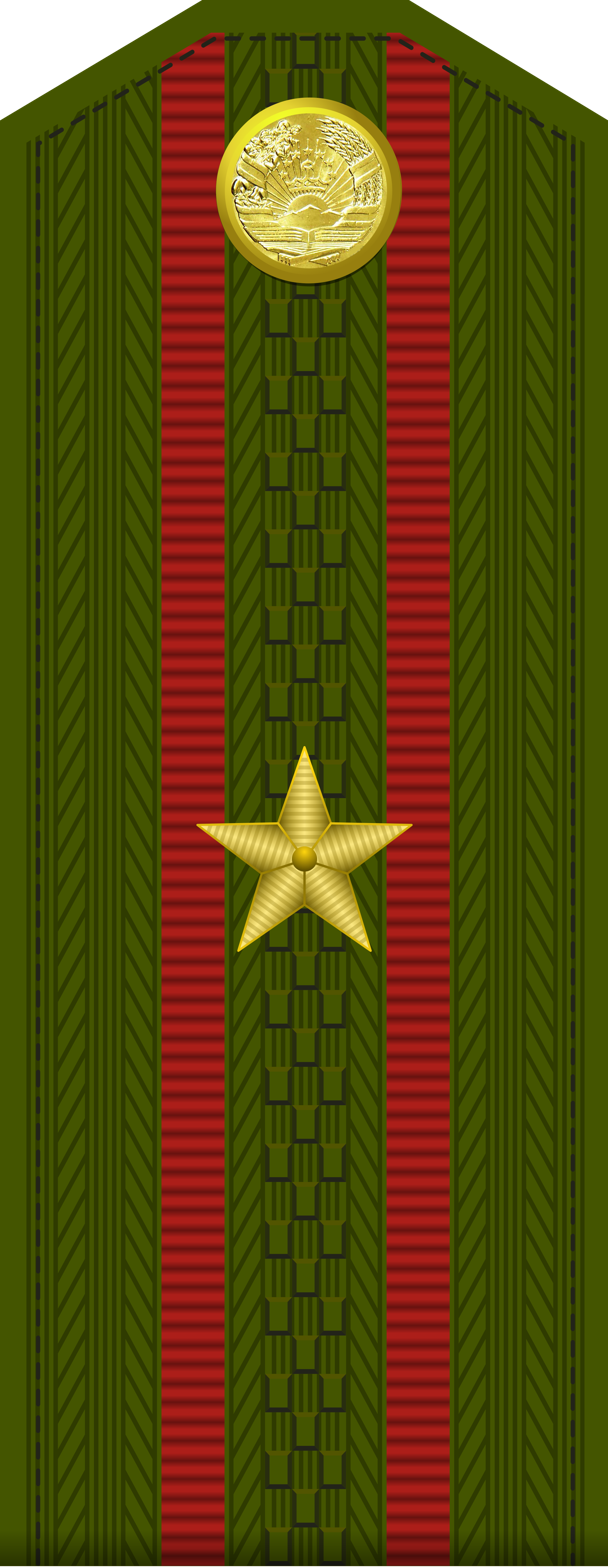
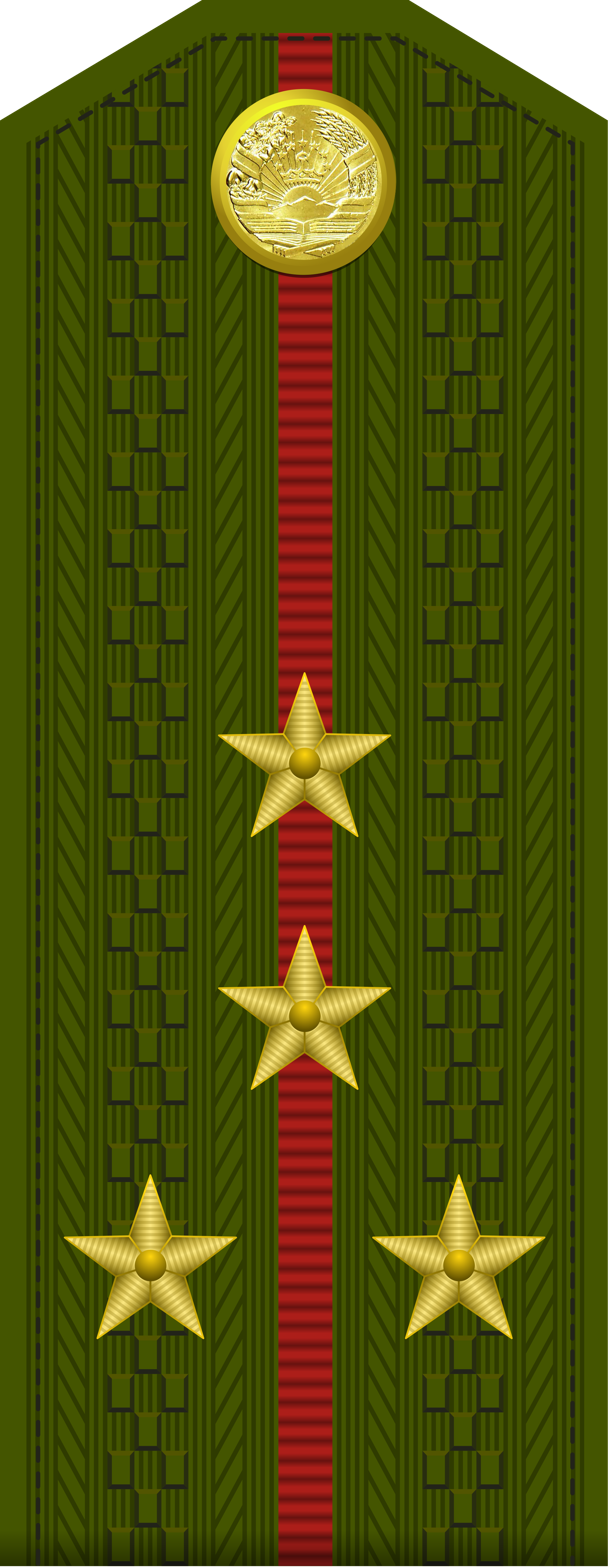
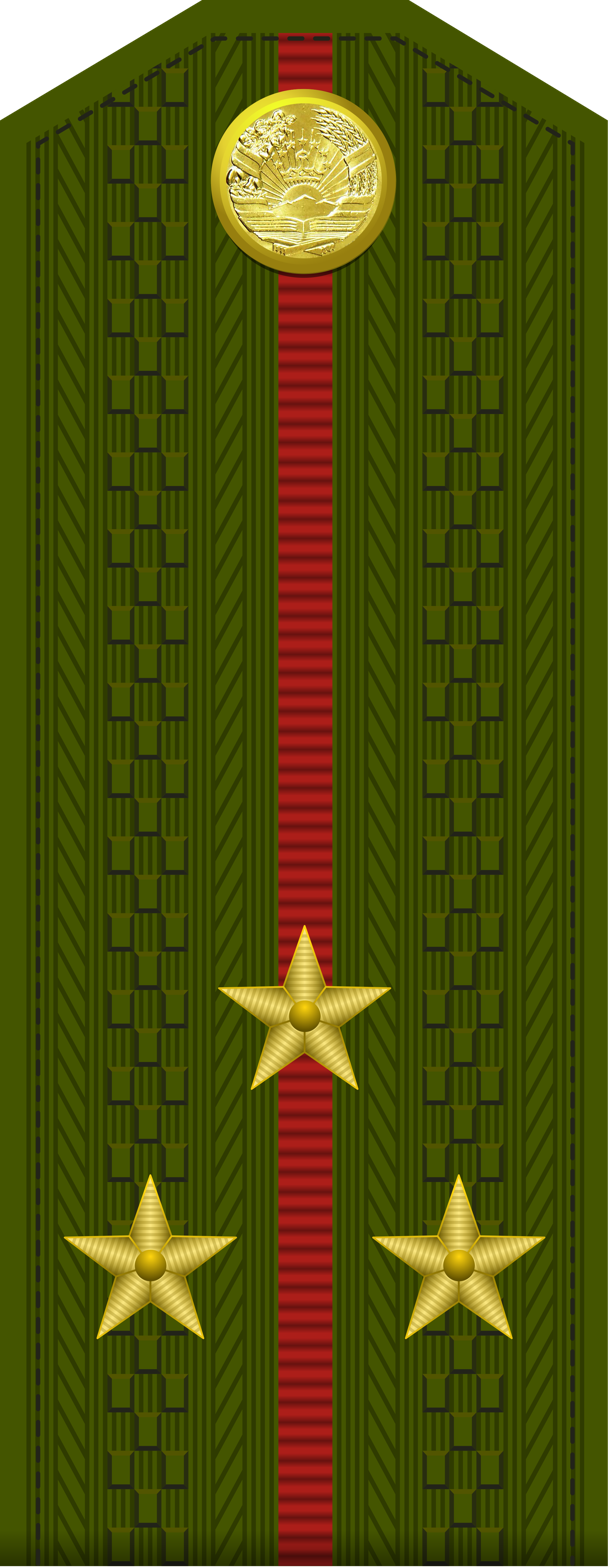
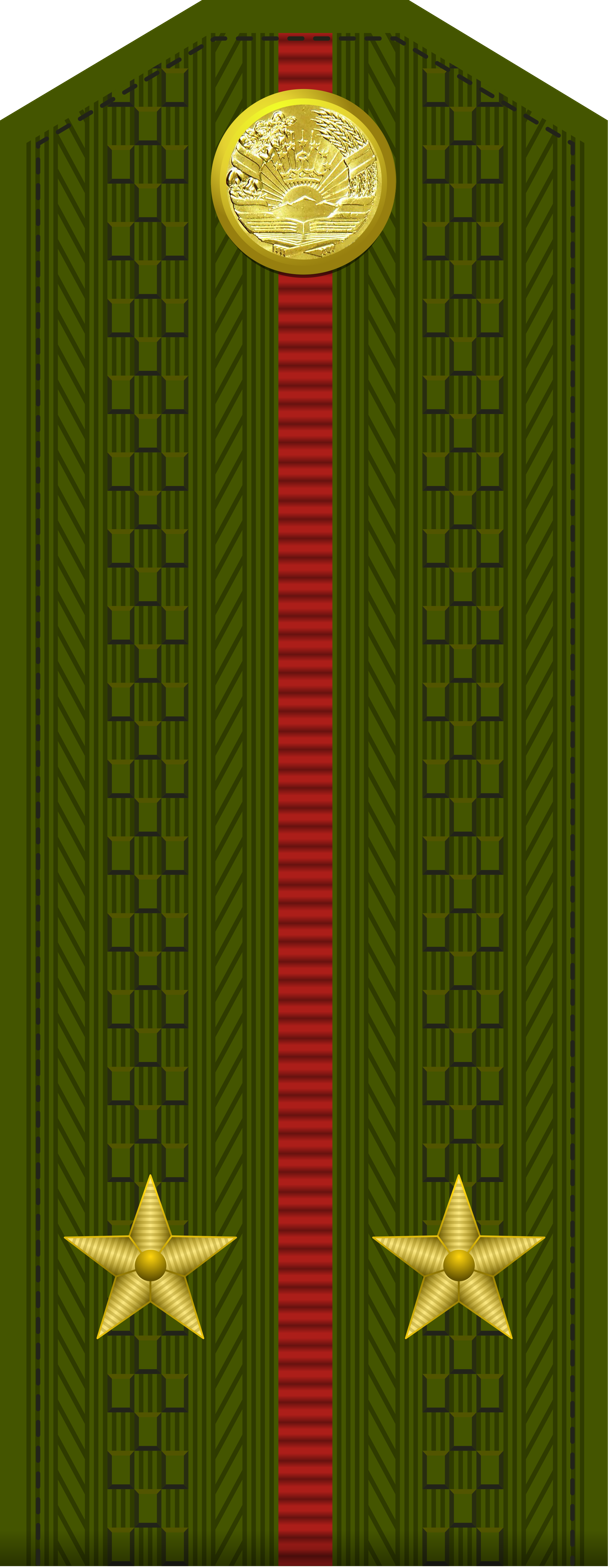
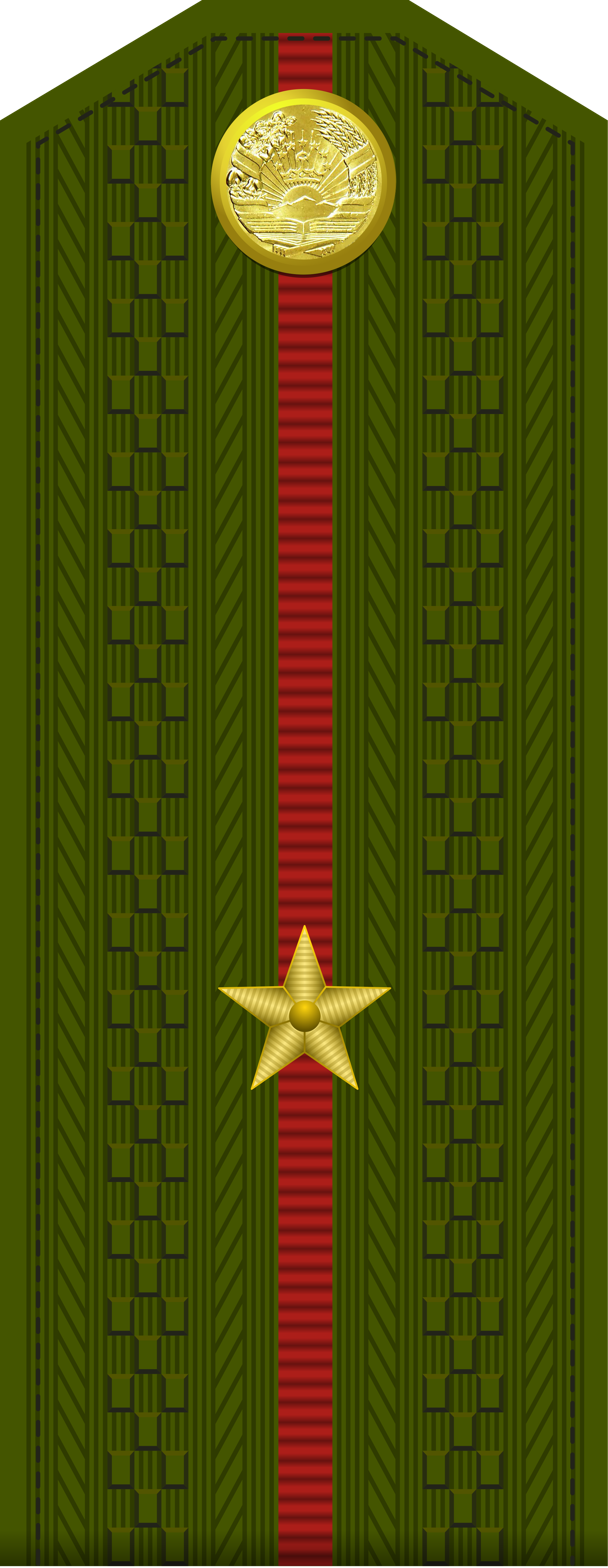
Rank group	General / flag officers								Senior officers					Junior officers
Islamic National Army
Islamic National Army	مارشال; Marshal		ستر جنرال; Setar jenral		ډگرجنرال; Dagar jenral	تورن جنرال; Turan jenral	برید جنرال; Brid jenral		ډگروال; Dagarwal		ډگرمن; Dagarman		جگرن; Jagran	جگتورن; Jag turan	تورن; Turan	لمړی بريدمن; Lomri baridman	دوهم بریدمن; Dvahomi baridman	دریم بریدمن; Dreyom baridman
Armenian Ground Forces
Armenian Ground Forces			Բանակի գեներալ Banaki general		գեներալ-գնդապետ General-gndapet	գեներալ-լեյտենանտ General-leytenant	գեներալ-մայոր General-mayor		գնդապետ Gndapet		փոխգնդապետ P’vokhgndapet		մայոր Mayor	կապիտան Kapitan		ավագ լեյտենանտ Avag leytenant	լեյտենանտ Leytenant	Կրտսեր լեյտենանտ Krtser leytenant
Azerbaijani Land Forces
Azerbaijani Land Forces			Ordu generalı		General-polkovnik	General-leytenant	General-mayor		Polkovnik		Polkovnik-leytenant		Mayor	Kapitan		Baş leytenant	Leytenant	Kiçik leytenant
Royal Bahraini Army
Royal Bahraini Army	مشیر; Mushir		فريق أول; Fariq 'awal		فريق; Fariq	لواء; Liwa	عميد; Amid		عقيد; Aqid		مقدم; Muqaddam		رائد; Ra'id	نقيب; Naqib		ملازم أول; Mulazim awwal		ملازم; Mulazim
Bangladesh Army
Bangladesh Army			জেনারেল; General		লেফটেন্যান্ট জেনারেল; Lieutenant general	মেজর জেনারেল; Major general	ব্রিগেডিয়ার জেনারেল; Brigadier general		কর্নেল; Colonel		লেফটেন্যান্ট কর্নেল; Lieutenant colonel		মেজর; Major	ক্যাপ্টেন; Captain		লেফটেন্যান্ট; Lieutenant		সেকেন্ড লেফটেন্যান্ট; Second lieutenant
Royal Bhutan Army
Royal Bhutan Army					གུང་ བློན་ གོང མ ། Gung blon gong ma	གུང་ བློན་ འོག མ ། Gung blon 'og ma	མདོ་ འཛིན ། Mdo 'dzin		དམག་ སྲིད་ གོང མ ། Dmag srid gong ma		དམག་ སྲིད་ འོག མ ། Dmag srid 'og ma		ལིང་ དཔོན ། Ling dpon	སྤྱི་ དཔོན ། Spyi dpon		སྡེ་ གོང་ ། Sde gong
Royal Bhutan Army					Lieutenant general	Major general	Brigadier		Colonel		Lieutenant colonel		Major	Captain		Lieutenant
Royal Brunei Land Force
Royal Brunei Land Force	Fil marsyal		Jeneral		Leftenan jeneral	Mejar jeneral	Brigedier jeneral		Kolonel		Leftenan kolonel		Mejar	Kapten		Leftenan		Leftenan muda
Royal Cambodian Army
Royal Cambodian Army	នាយឧត្ដមសេនីយ៍ផុតលេខ; Neay utdamsenei phot lek		នាយឧត្ដមសេនីយ៍ Neay utdamsenei		ឧត្ដមសេនីយ៍ឯក; Utdamsenei ek	ឧត្តមសេនីយ៍ទោ Utdamsenei tou	ឧត្តមសេនីយ៍ត្រី Utdamsenei trei		វរសេនីយ៍ឯក; Veareasenei ek		វរសេនីយ៍ទោ Veareasenei tou		វរសេនីយ៍ត្រី Veareasenei trei	អនុសេនីយ៍ឯក; Anusenei ek		អនុសេនីយ៍ទោ Anusenei tou		អនុសេនីយ៍ត្រី Anusenei trei
PLA Ground Force
PLA Ground Force			上将; Shàngjiāng		中将; Zhōngjiāng	少将; Shàojiāng			大校; Dàxiào	上校; Shàngxiào	中校; Zhōngxiào		少校; Shàoxiào	上尉; Shàngwèi		中尉; Zhōngwèi		少尉; Shàowèi
Republic of China Army
Republic of China Army			一級上將; It-kip siōng-chiòng	二級上將; Jī-kip siōng-chiòng	中將; Tiong-chiòng	少將; Siáu-chiòng			上校; Siōng-hāu		中校; Tiong-hāu		少校; Siáu-hāu	上尉; Siōng-ùi		中尉; Tiong-ùi		少尉; Siáu-ùi
Indian Army
Indian Army	Field marshal फील्ड मार्शल		General जनरल		Lieutenant general लेफ्टिनेंट जनरल	Major general मेजर जनरल	Brigadier ब्रिगेडियर		Colonel कर्नल		Lieutenant colonel लेफ्टिनेंट कर्नल		Major मेजर	Captain कैप्टन		Lieutenant लेफ्टिनेंट
Rank group	General / flag officers								Senior officers					Junior officers
Indonesian Army
Indonesian Army	Jenderal besar		Jenderal		Letnan jenderal	Mayor jenderal	Brigadir jenderal		Kolonel		Letnan kolonel		Mayor	Kapten		Letnan satu		Letnan dua
Iranian Ground Forces
Iranian Ground Forces			ارتشبد; Arteshbod		سپهبد; Sepahbod	سرلشکر; Sarlashkar	سرتیپ; Sartip	سرتیپ دوم; Sartip dovom	سرهنگ; Sarhang		سرهنگ دوم; Sarhang dovom		سرگرد; Sargord	سروان; Sarvān		ستوان یکم; Sotvān yekom	ستوان دوم; Sotvān dovom	ستوان سوم; Sotvān sevom
Iraqi Ground Forces
Iraqi Ground Forces	مشیر; Mushir		فريق أول; Fariq 'awal		فريق; Fariq	لواء; Liwa	عميد; Amid		عقيد; Aqid		مقدم; Muqaddam		رائد; Ra'id	نقيب; Naqib		ملازم أول; Mulazim awwal		ملازم; Mulazim
Israeli Ground Forces
Israeli Ground Forces					רב-אלוף; Rav aluf	אלוף; Aluf	תת-אלוף; Tat aluf		אלוף משנה; Aluf mishne		סגן-אלוף; Sgan aluf		רב סרן; Rav seren	סרן; Seren		סגן; Segen		סגן-משנה; Segen mishne
Japan Ground Self-Defense Force
Japan Ground Self-Defense Force			幕僚長および統合作戦司令官たる陸将; Bakuryōchō-oyobi-Tōgōsakusenshireikan-taru-rikushō		陸将; Rikushō	陸将補; Rikushō-ho			1等陸佐; Ittō rikusa		2等陸佐; Nitō rikusa		3等陸佐; Santō rikusa	1等陸尉; Ittō rikui		2等陸尉; Nitō rikui	3等陸尉; Santō rikui	准陸尉; Jun rikui
Royal Jordanian Army
Royal Jordanian Army	مشیر; Mushir		فريق أول; Fariq 'awal		فريق; Fariq	لواء; Liwa	عميد; Amid		عقيد; Aqid		مقدم; Muqaddam		رائد; Ra'id	نقيب; Naqib		ملازم أول; Mulazim awwal		ملازم; Mulazim
Kazakh Ground Forces
Kazakh Ground Forces	Жоғарғы Бас қолбасшының Joğarğı Bas qolbasşınıñ		Армия генералы Armïya generalı		Генерал-полковник; General-polkovnïk	Генерал-лейтенант; General-leytenant	Генерал-майор; General-mayor		Полковник; Polkovnïk		Подполковник; Podpolkovnïk		Майор; Mayor	Капитан; Kapïtan		Аға лейтенант Ağa leytenant		Лейтенант; Leytenant
Korean People's Army Ground Force
Korean People's Army Ground Force	인민군원수; Inmingun-wonsu	차수; Chasu	대장; Daejang		상장; Sangjang	중장; Chungjang	소장; Sojang		대좌; Daechwa	상좌; Sangjwa	중좌; Chungjwa		소좌; Sojwa	대위; Taewi		상위; Sangwi	중위; Chungwi	소위; Sowi
Republic of Korea Army
Republic of Korea Army	원수; Wonsu		대장; Daejang		중장; Jungjang	소장; Sojang	준장; Junjang		대령; Daeryeong		중령; Jungnyeong		소령; Soryeong	대위; Daewi		중위; Jungwi		소위; Sowi
Kuwait Army
Kuwait Army			فريق أول; Fariq 'awal		فريق; Fariq	لواء; Liwa	عميد; Amid		عقيد; Aqid		مقدم; Muqaddam		رائد; Ra'id	نقيب; Naqib		ملازم أول; Mulazim awwal		ملازم; Mulazim
Kyrgyz Army
Kyrgyz Army							Генерал-майор; General-mayor		Полковник; Polkovnik		Подполковник; Podpolkovnik		Майор; Mayor	Капитан; Kapitan		Улук лейтенант Uluk leytenant	Лейтенант; Leytenant	Кенже лейтенант Kenje leytenant
Rank group	General / flag officers								Senior officers					Junior officers
Lao People's Army
Lao People's Army			ພົນເອກ; Phonoek		ພົນໂທ; Phonoth	ພົນຕີ Phon ti	ພົນຈັດຕະວາ; Phonchadtauaa		ພັນເອກ; Phanoek		ພັນໂທ; Phanoth		ພັນຕີ Phan ti	ຮ້ອຍເອກ; Honyoek		ຮ້ອຍໂທ; Hony oth		ຮ້ອຍຕີ Hony ti
Lebanese Ground Forces
Lebanese Ground Forces					عماد; Eimad	لواء; Liwa	عميد; Amid		عقيد; Aqid		مقدم; Muqaddam		رائد; Ra'id	نقيب; Naqib		ملازم أول; Mulazim awwal		ملازم; Mulazim
Malaysian Army
Malaysian Army	Fil marsyal		Jeneral		Leftenan jeneral	Mejar jeneral	Brigedier jeneral		Kolonel		Leftenan kolonel		Mejar	Kapten		Leftenan		Leftenan muda
Maldives Marine Corps
Maldives Marine Corps			ޖެނެރަލް Jeneral		ލެފްޓިނަންޓް ޖެނެރަލް Leftinant jeneral	މޭޖަރ ޖެނެރަލް Meyjar jeneral	ބްރިގޭޑިއަރ ޖެނެރަލް Brigeydiar jeneral		ކާނަލް Kaanal		ލެފްޓިނަންޓް ކާނަލް Leftinant kaanal		މޭޖަރ; Meyjar	ކެޕްޓަން Keptan		ފަސްޓް ލެފްޓިނަންޓް Fast leftinant		ލެފްޓިނަންޓް Leftinant
Mongolian Ground Force
Mongolian Ground Force			Генерал; Gyenyeral		Дэслэгч генерал Deslegch gyenyeral	Хошууч генерал Khoshuuch gyenyeral	Бригадын генерал Brigadyn gyenyeral		Хурандаа; Khurandaa		Дэд хурандаа Ded khurandaa		Хошууч; Khoshuuch	Ахмад; Akhmad		Ахлах дэслэгч Akhmad deslegch		Дэслэгч; Deslegch
Myanmar Army
Myanmar Army	ဗိုလ်ချုပ်မှူးကြီး Builʻkhyupʻmhūʺkrīʺ		ဒုတိယ ဗိုလ်ချုပ်မှူးကြီး Dutiya builʻkhyupʻmhūʺkrīʺ	ဗိုလ်ချုပ်ကြီး Builʻkhyupʻkrīʺ	ဒုတိယ ဗိုလ်ချုပ်ကြီး Dutiya builʻkhyupʻkrīʺ	ဗိုလ်ချုပ် Builʻkhyupʻ	ဗိုလ်မှူးချုပ် Builʻmhūʺkhyupʻ		ဗိုလ်မှူးကြီး Builʻmhūʺkrīʺ		ဒုတိယ ဗိုလ်မှူးကြီး Dutiya builʻmhūʺkrīʺ		ဗိုလ်မှူး Builʻmhūʺ	ဗိုလ်ကြီး Builʻkrīʺ		ဗိုလ် Builʻ		ဒုတိယ ဗိုလ် Dutiyabuilʻ
Nepali Army
Nepali Army			महारथी (प्रधानसेनापती); Mahārathī (pradhānasēnāpatī)		रथी Rathī	उपरथी Uparathī	सहायक रथी Sahaayak rathee		महासेनानी Mahāsēnānī		प्रमुख सेनानी Pramukh senaanee		सेनानी Senaanee	सहसेनानी Sahasēnānī		उपसेनानी Upasēnānī		सहायक सेनानी Sahaayak senaanee
Nepali Army			COAS General		Lieutenant general	Major general	Brigadier general		Colonel		Lieutenant colonel		Major	Captain		Lieutenant		Second lieutenant
Royal Army of Oman
Royal Army of Oman	مشیر; Mushir		فريق أول; Fariq 'awal		فريق; Fariq	لواء; Liwa	عميد; Amid		عقيد; Aqid		مقدم; Muqaddam		رائد; Ra'id	نقيب; Naqib		ملازم أول; Mulazim awwal		ملازم; Mulazim
Pakistan Army
Pakistan Army	Field marshal فیلڈ مارشل		General جنرل		Lieutenant general لیفٹیننٹ جنرل	Major general میجر جنرل	Brigadier بریگیڈیئر		Colonel کرنل		Lieutenant colonel لیفٹیننٹ کرنل		Major میجر	Captain کیپٹن		Lieutenant لیفٹنینٹ		Second lieutenant سیکنڈ لیفٹیننٹ
Philippine Army
Philippine Army			General		Lieutenant general	Major general	Brigadier general		Colonel		Lieutenant Colonel		Major	Captain		First lieutenant		Second lieutenant
Qatari Emiri Land Force
Qatari Emiri Land Force			فريق أول; Fariq 'awal		فريق; Fariq	لواء; Liwa	عميد; Amid		عقيد; Aqid		مقدم; Muqaddam		رائد; Ra'id	نقيب; Naqib		ملازم أول; Mulazim awwal		ملازم; Mulazim
Russian Ground Forces
Russian Ground Forces	Маршал Российской Федерации; Marshal Rossiyskoy Federatsii		Генерал армии General armii		Генерал-полковник; General-polkovnik	Генерал-лейтенант; General-leytenant	Генерал-майор; General-mayor		Полковник; Polkovnik		Подполковник; Podpolkovnik		Майор; Mayor	Kапитан; Kapitan		Старший лейтенант Starshiy leytenant	Лейтенант; Leytenant	Mладший лейтенант Mladshiy leytenant
Rank group	General / flag officers								Senior officers					Junior officers
Saudi Arabian Army
Saudi Arabian Army			فريق أول; Fariq 'awal		فريق; Fariq	لواء; Liwa	عميد; Amid		عقيد; Aqid		مقدم; Muqaddam		رائد; Ra'id	نقيب; Naqib		ملازم أول; Mulazim awwal		ملازم; Mulazim
Singapore Army			No insignia yet
Singapore Army			General		Lieutenant general	Major general	Brigadier general		Colonel		Senior lieutenant colonel	Lieutenant colonel	Major	Captain		Lieutenant		Second lieutenant
Sri Lanka Army
Sri Lanka Army	Field marshal		General		Lieutenant general	Major general	Brigadier		Colonel		Lieutenant colonel		Major	Captain		Lieutenant		Second lieutenant
Syrian Army
Syrian Army	فريق; Fariq		عماد أول; Eimad 'awal		عماد; Eimad	لواء; Alliwa'	عميد; Amid		عقيد; Aqid		مقدم; Muqaddam		رائد; Ra'id	نقيب; Naqib		ملازم أول; Mulazim awwal		ملازم; Mulazim
Tajik Ground Forces
Tajik Ground Forces			Генерали артиш Generali artish		Генерал-полковник; General-polkovnik	Генерал-лейтенант; General-leytenant	Генерал-майор; General-mayor		Полковник; Polkovnik		Подполковник; Podpolkovnik		Майор; Mayor	Капитан; Kapitan		Лейтенанти калон Leytenanti kalon	Лейтенант; Leytenant	Лейтенанти хурд Leytenanti xurd
Royal Thai Army
Royal Thai Army	จอมพล; Chom phon		พลเอก; Phon ek		พลโท; Phon tho	พลตรี Phon tri			พันเอก; Phan ek		พันโท; Phan tho		พันตรี Phan tri	ร้อยเอก; Roi ek		ร้อยโท; Roi tho		ร้อยตรี Roi tri
Timor-Leste Army
Timor-Leste Army					Tenente-general	Major-general	Brigadeiro-general		Coronel		Tenente-coronel		Major	Capitão		Tenente		Alferes
Turkmen Ground Forces
Turkmen Ground Forces			Goşun generaly		General-polkownik	General-leýtenant	General-maýor		Polkownik		Podpolkownik		Maýor	Kapitan		Uly leýtenant	Leýtenant	Kiçi leýtenant
United Arab Emirates Army
United Arab Emirates Army			فريق أول; Fariq 'awal		فريق; Fariq	لواء; Liwa	عميد; Amid		عقيد; Aqid		مقدم; Muqaddam		رائد; Ra'id	نقيب; Naqib		ملازم أول; Mulazim awwal		ملازم; Mulazim
Uzbek Ground Forces
Uzbek Ground Forces			Armiya generali		General-polkovnik	General-leytenant	General-mayor		Polkovnik		Podpolkovnik		Mayor	Kapitan		Katta leytenant		Leytenant
Vietnam People's Ground Force
Vietnam People's Ground Force			Đại tướng		Thượng tướng	Trung tướng	Thiếu tướng		Đại tá	Thượng tá	Trung tá		Thiếu tá	Đại úy		Thượng úy	Trung úy	Thiếu úy
Yemeni Land Forces
Yemeni Land Forces	مشیر; Mushir		فريق أول; Fariq 'awal		فريق; Fariq	لواء; Liwa	عميد; Amid		عقيد; Aqid		مقدم; Muqaddam		رائد; Ra'id	نقيب; Naqib		ملازم أول; Mulazim awwal		ملازم ثان; Mulazim than
Rank group	General / flag officers								Senior officers					Junior officers

== See also ==
- Comparative army officer ranks of the Americas
- Ranks and insignia of NATO armies officers
- Comparative military ranks of Korea
