= Comparative navy officer ranks of Asia =

Rank comparison chart of navies of Asian states.

== Officers ==
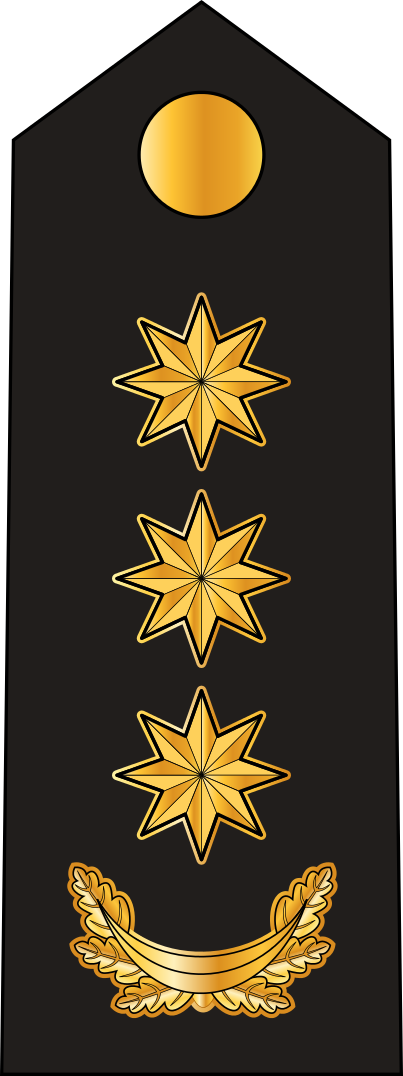
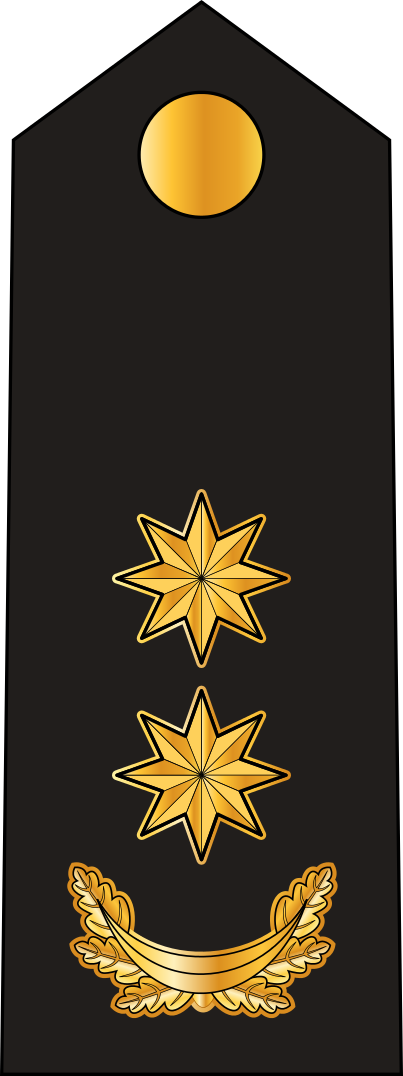
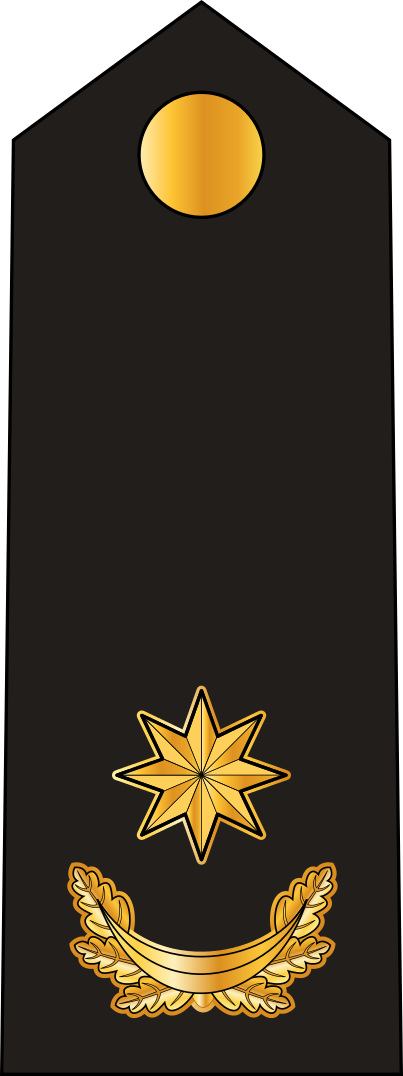
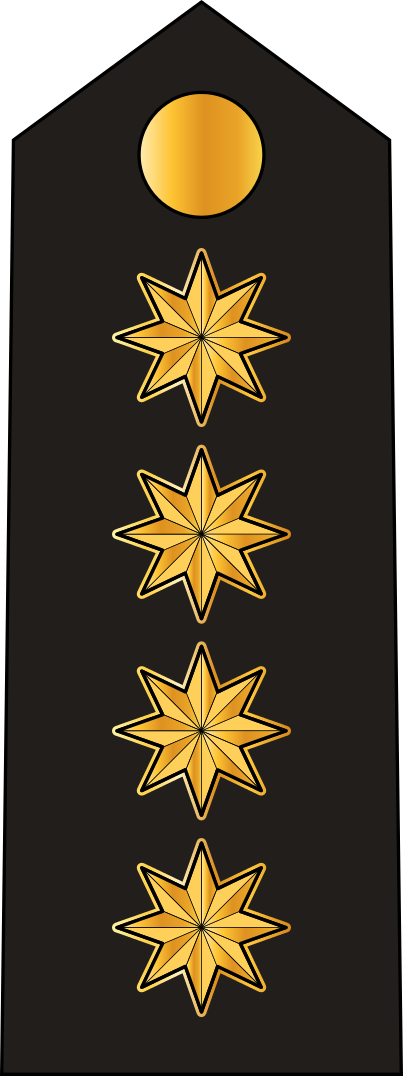
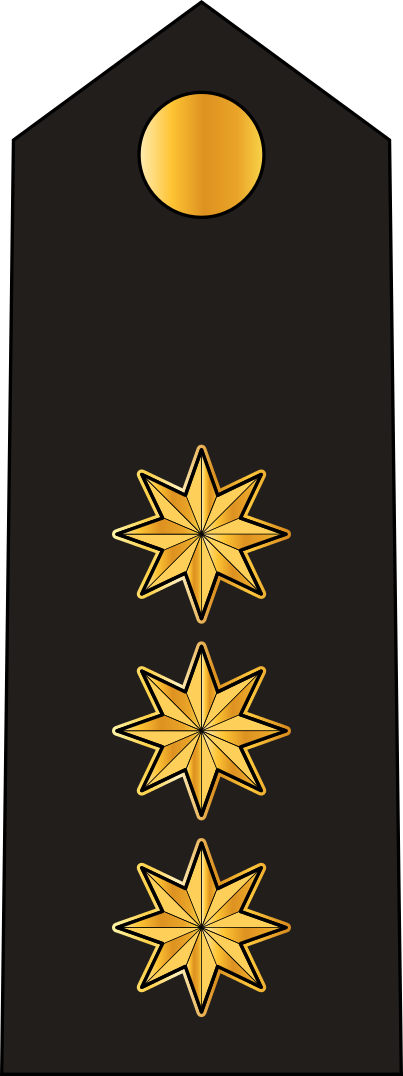
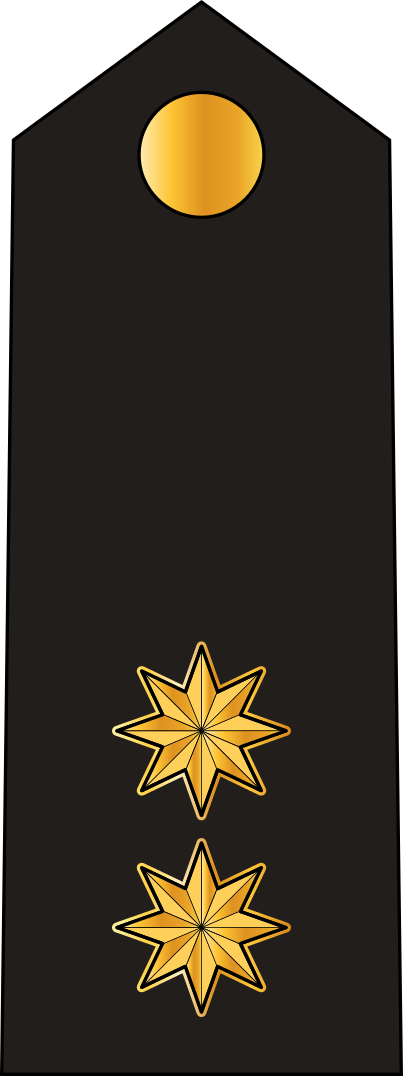
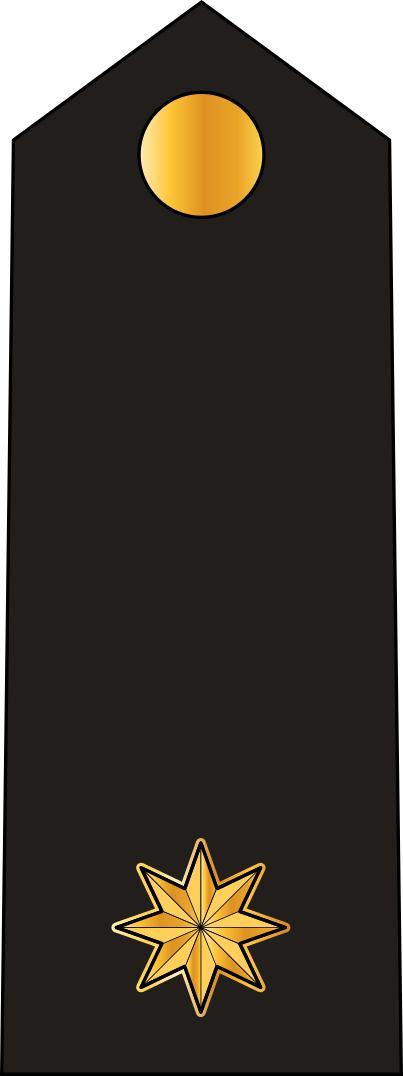
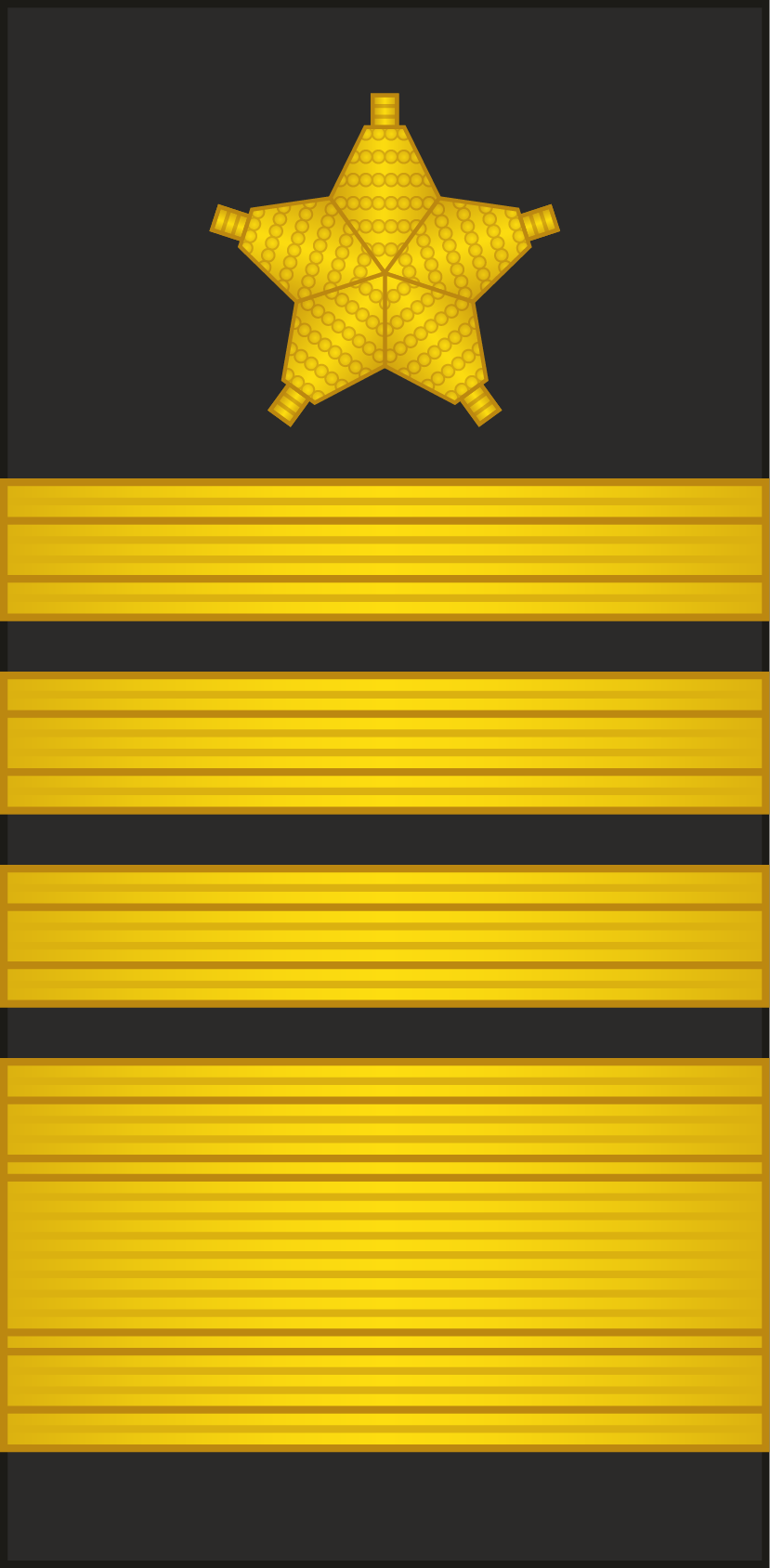
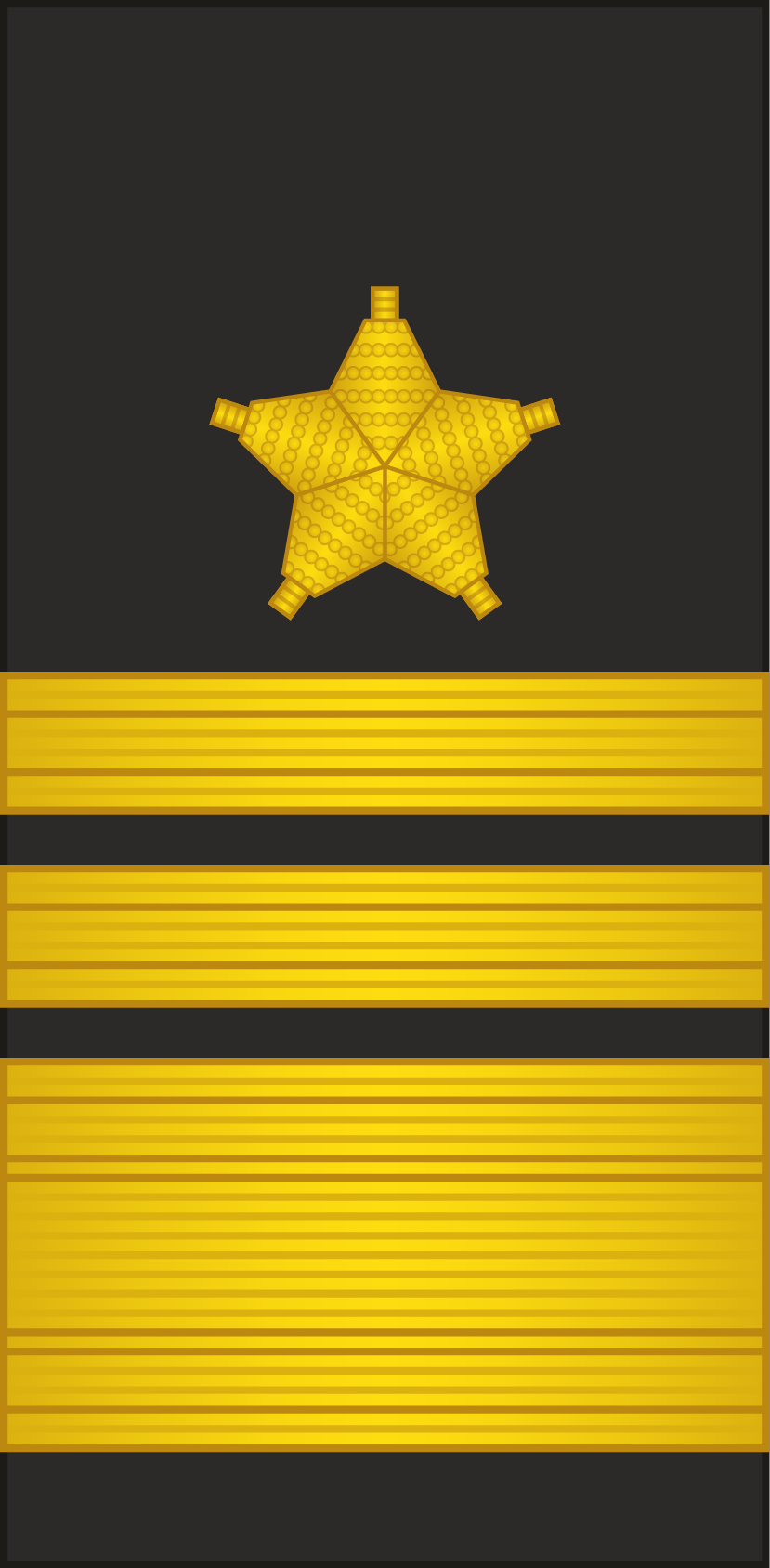
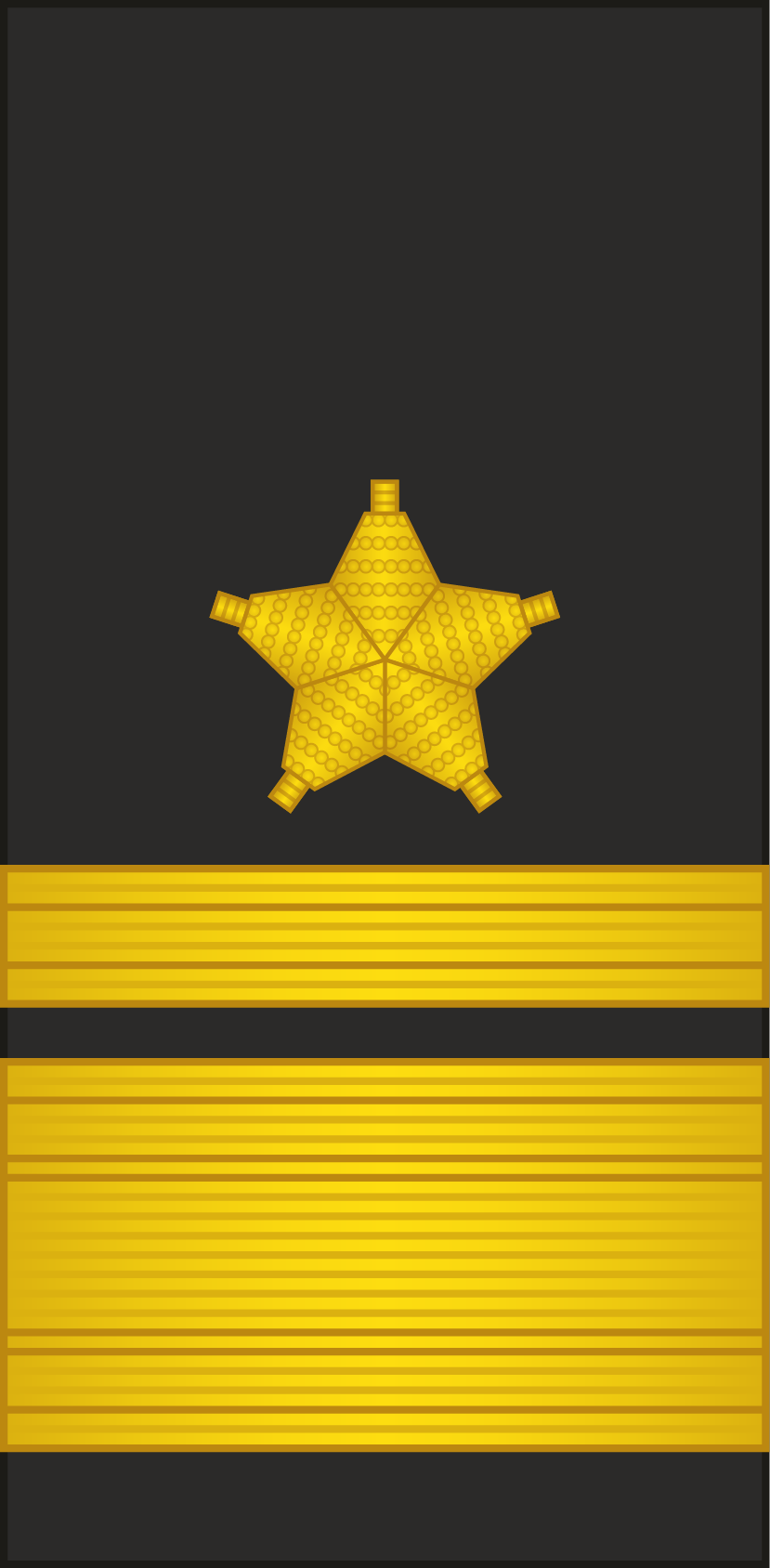
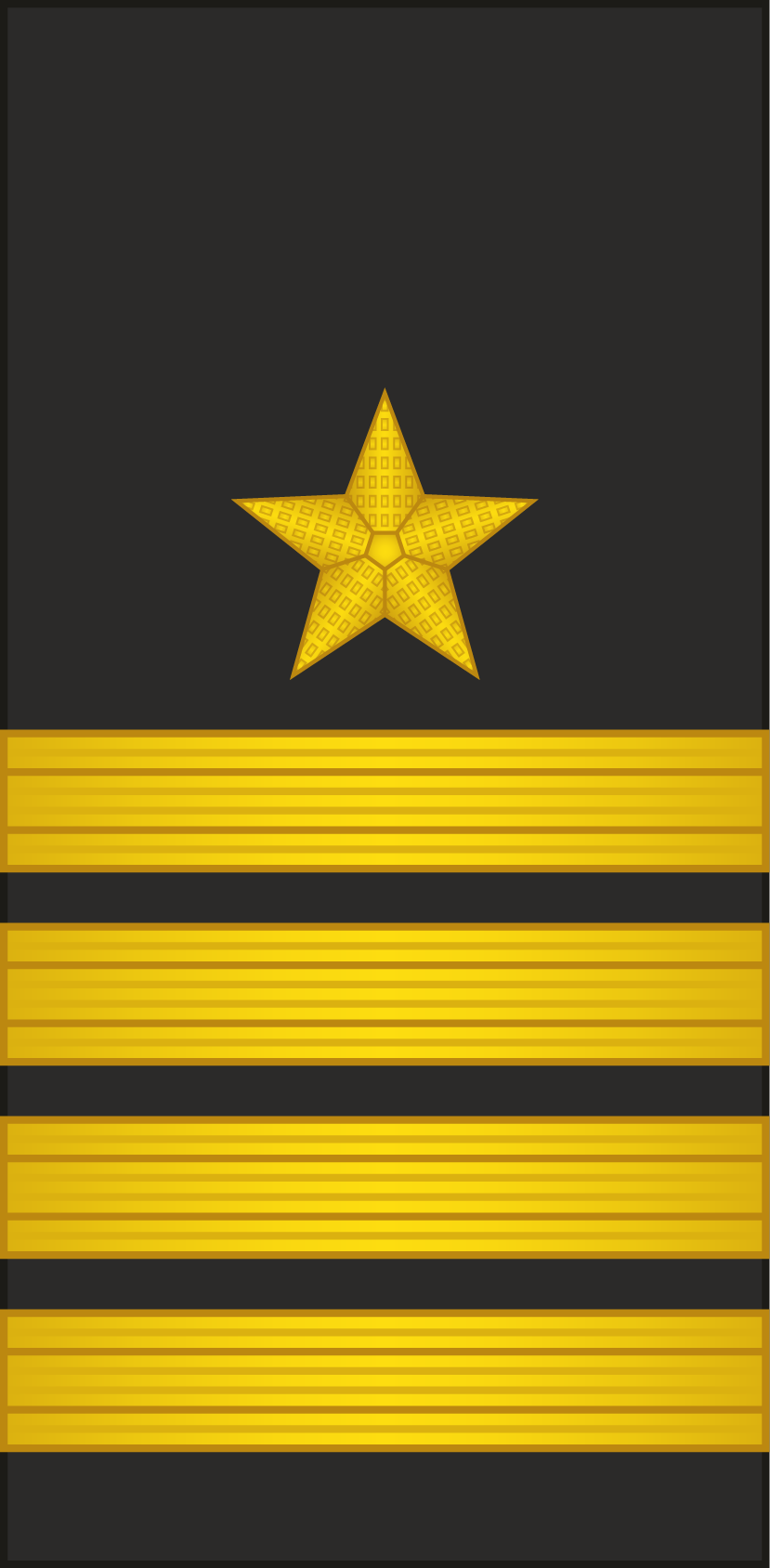
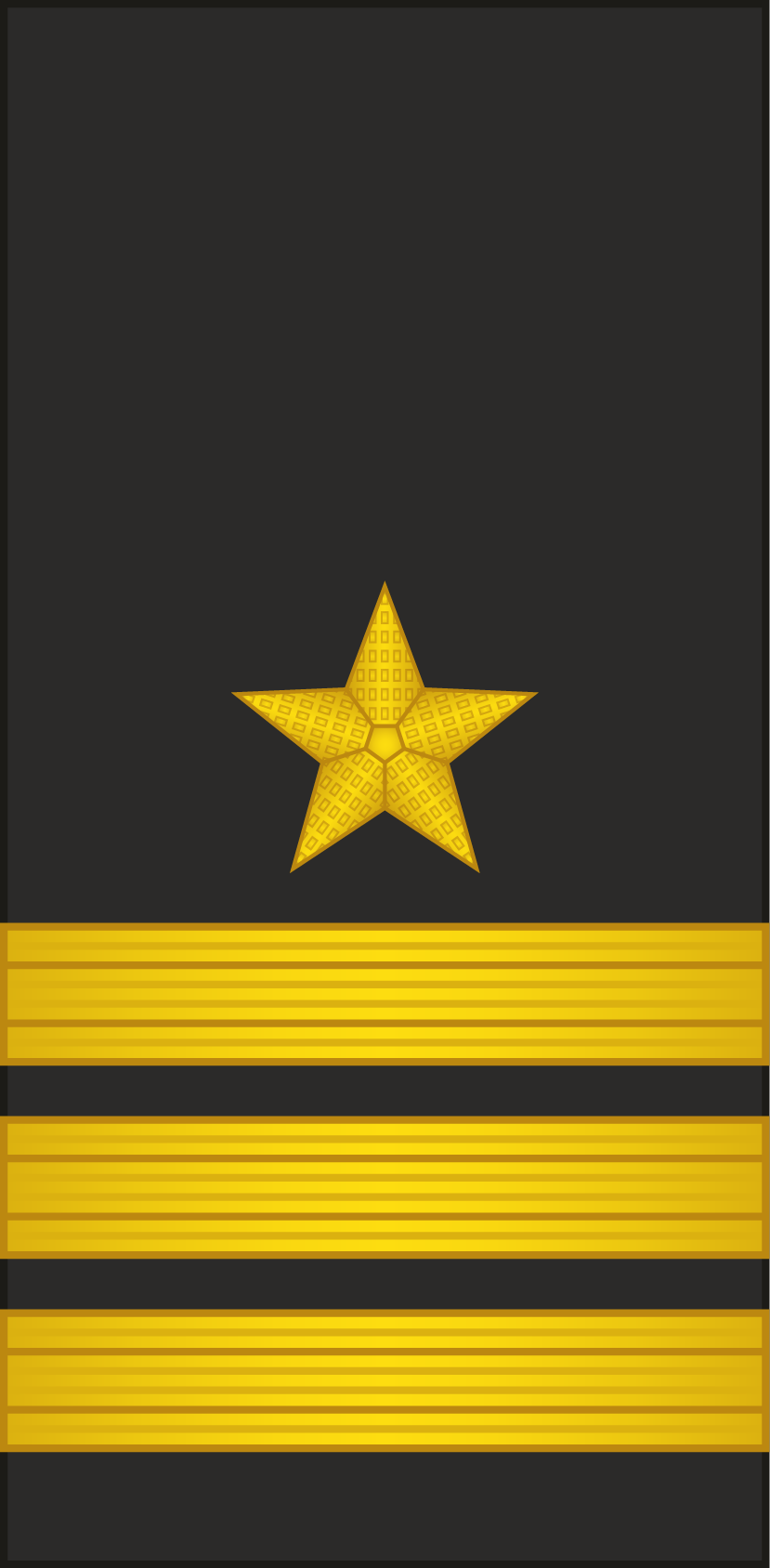
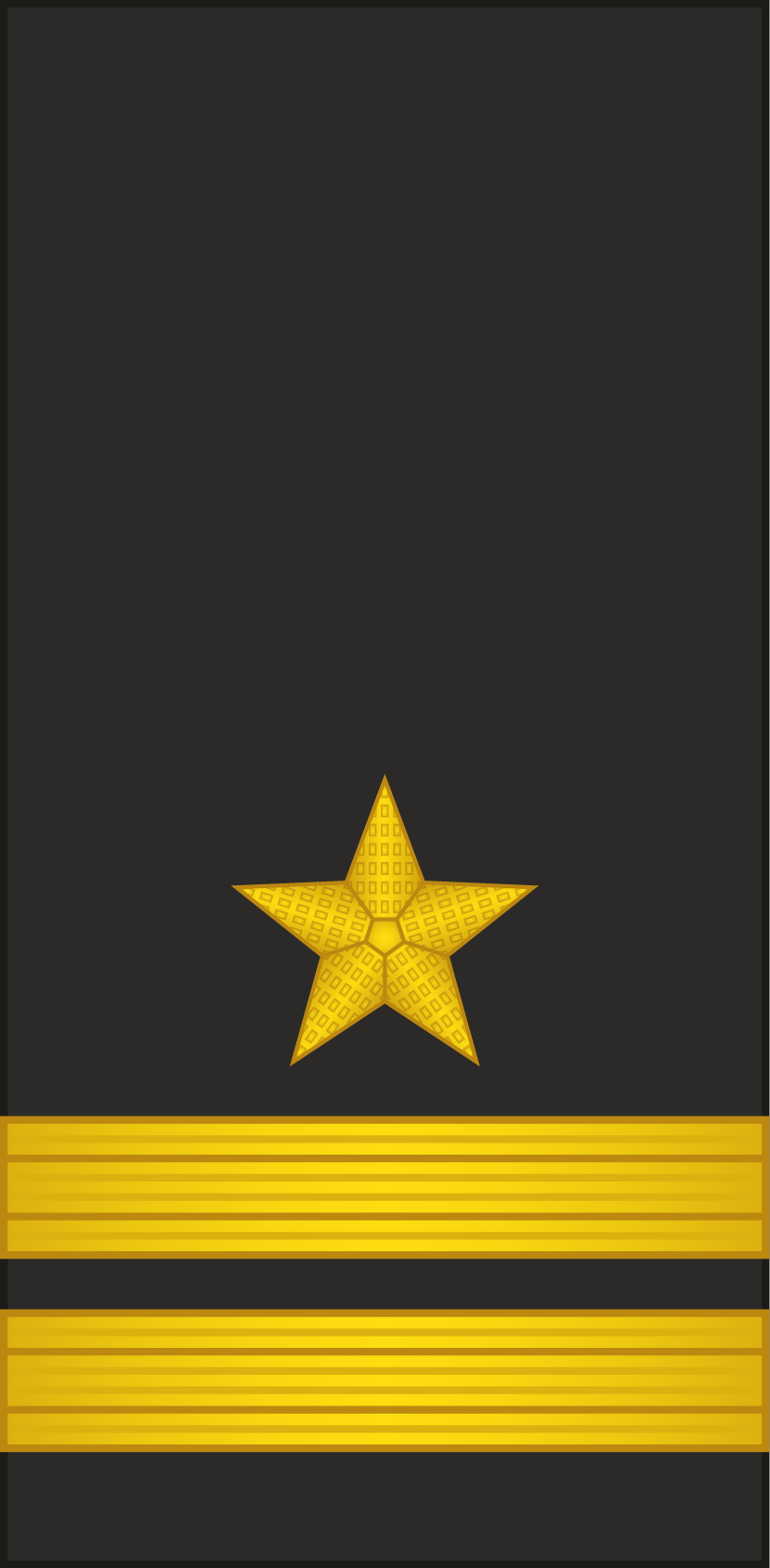
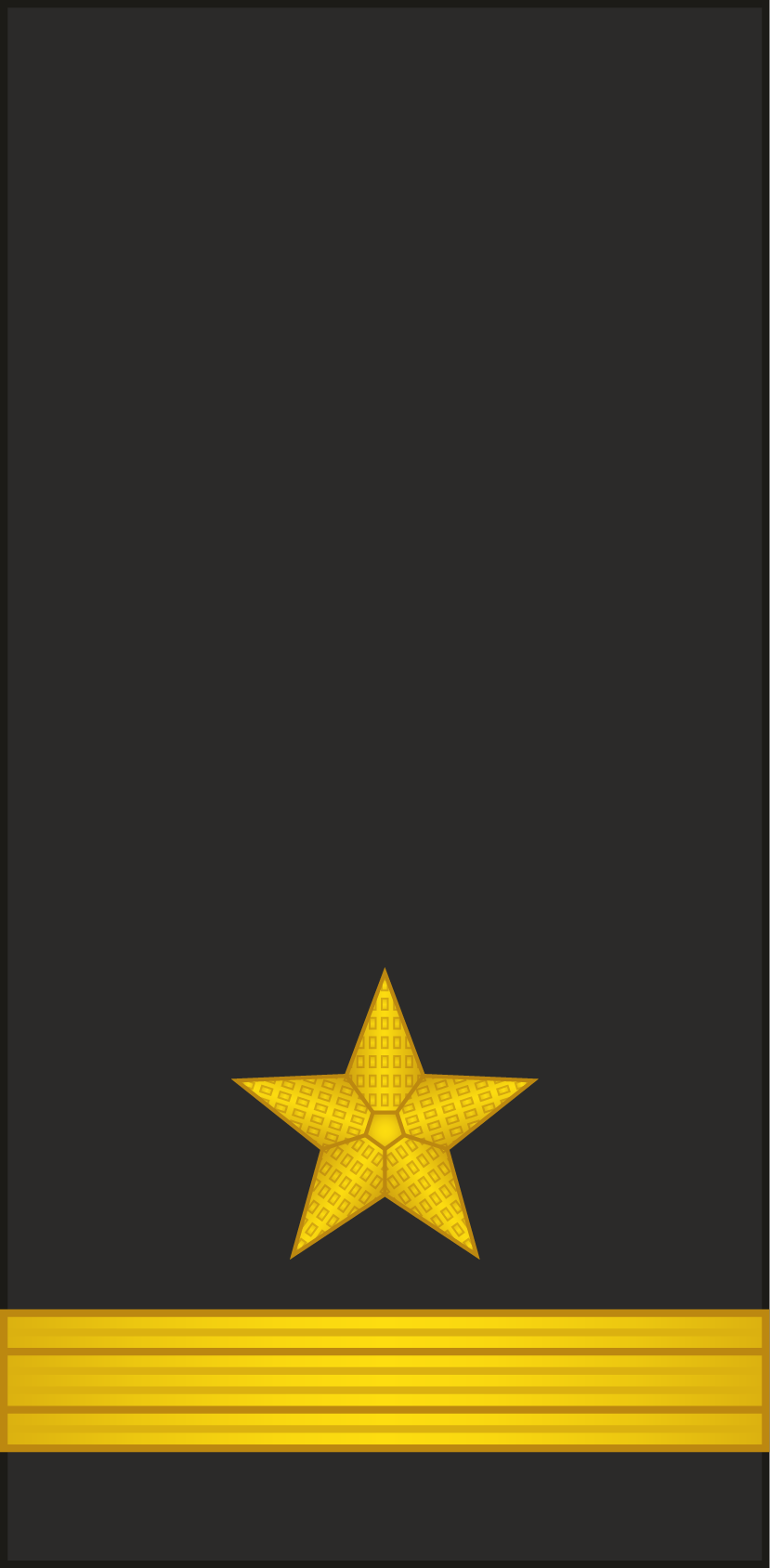
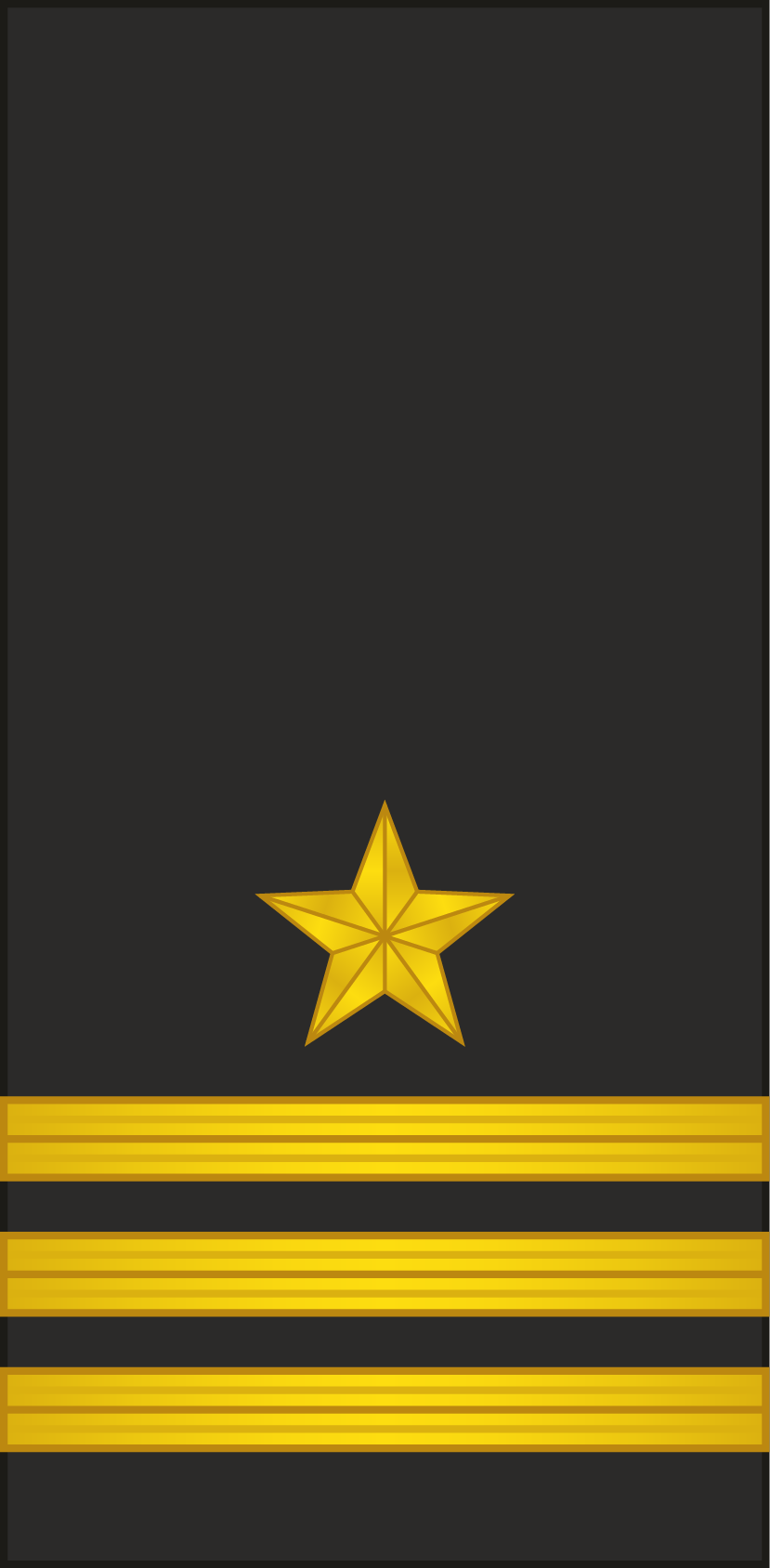
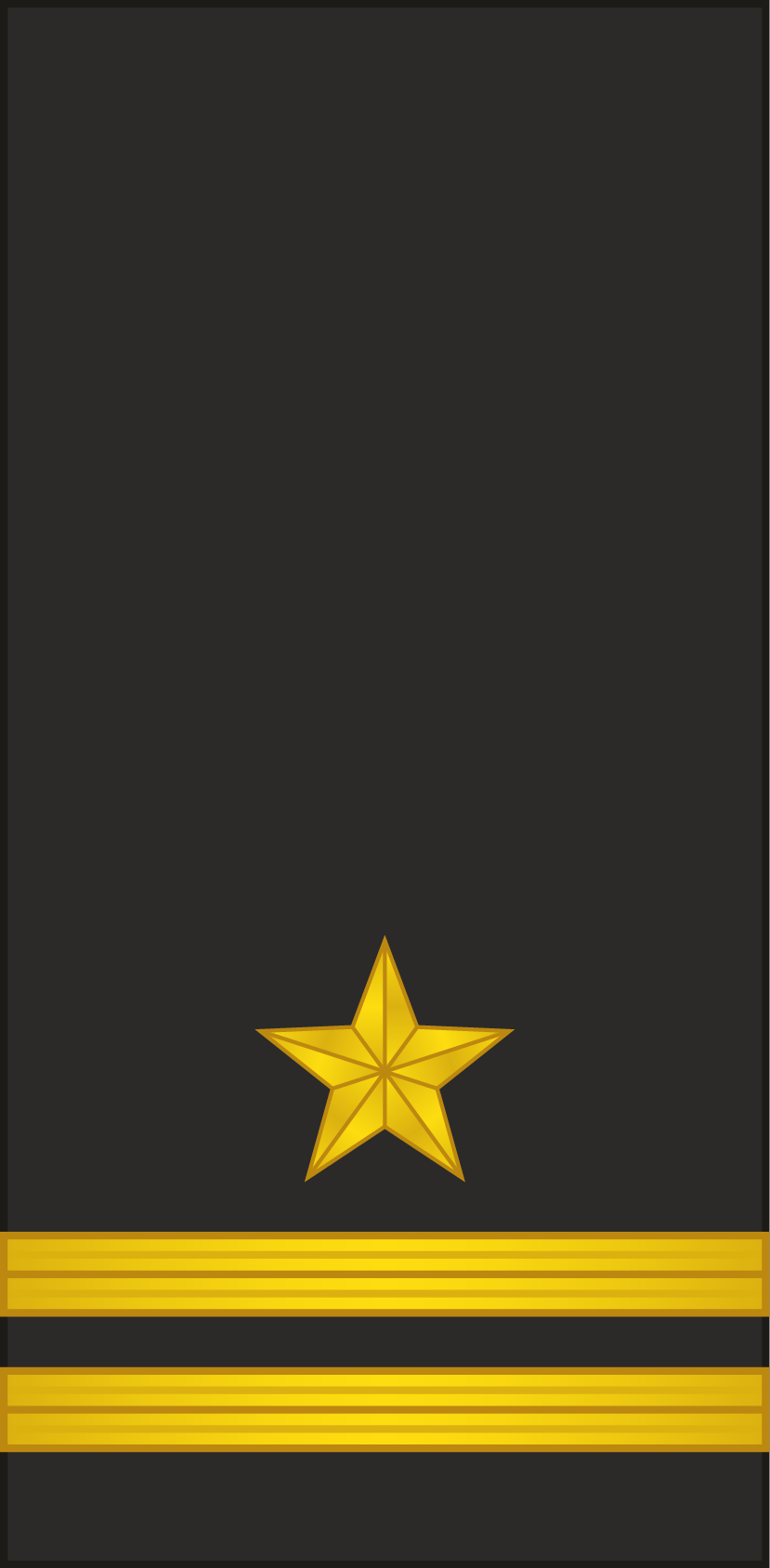
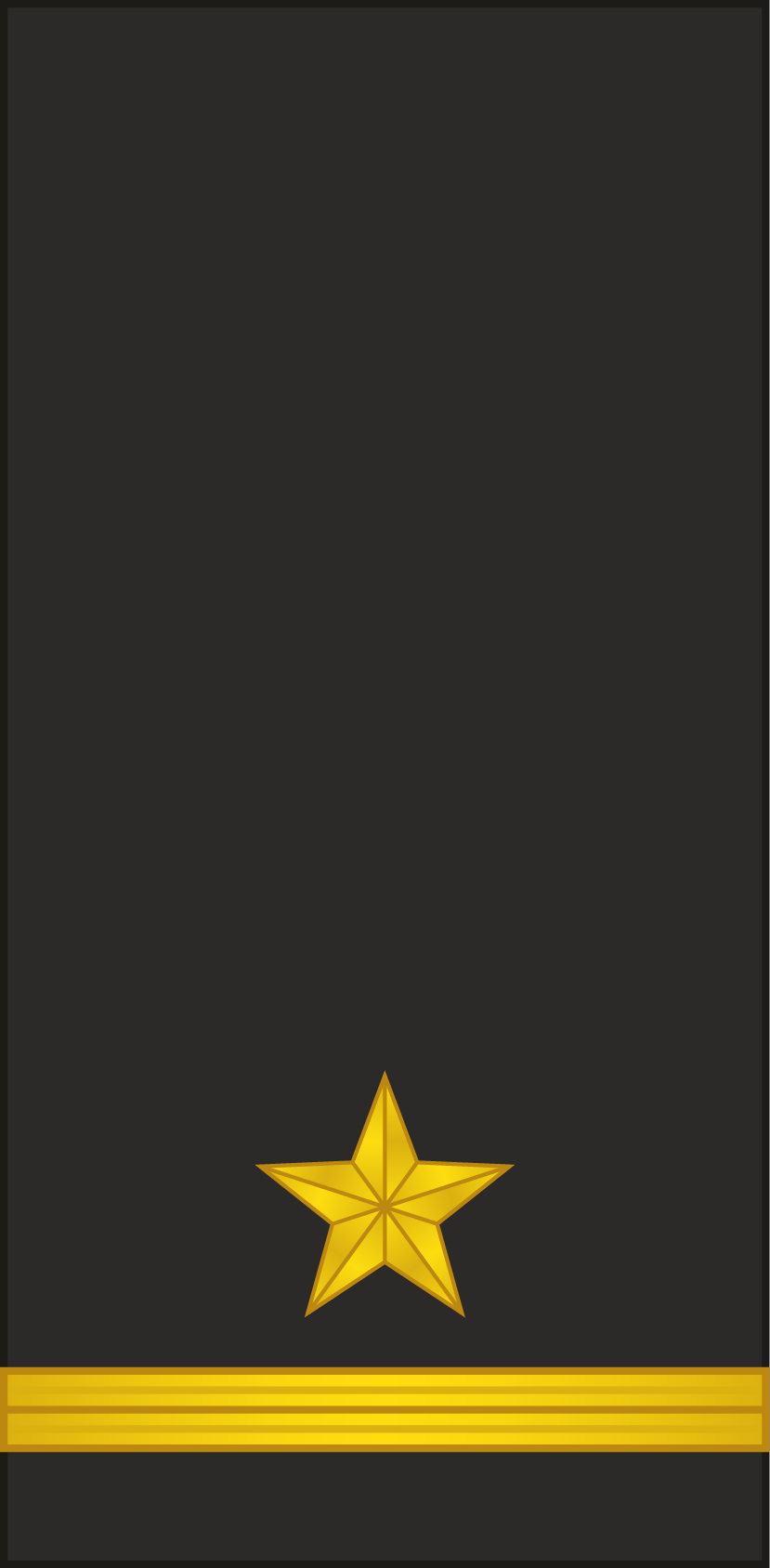
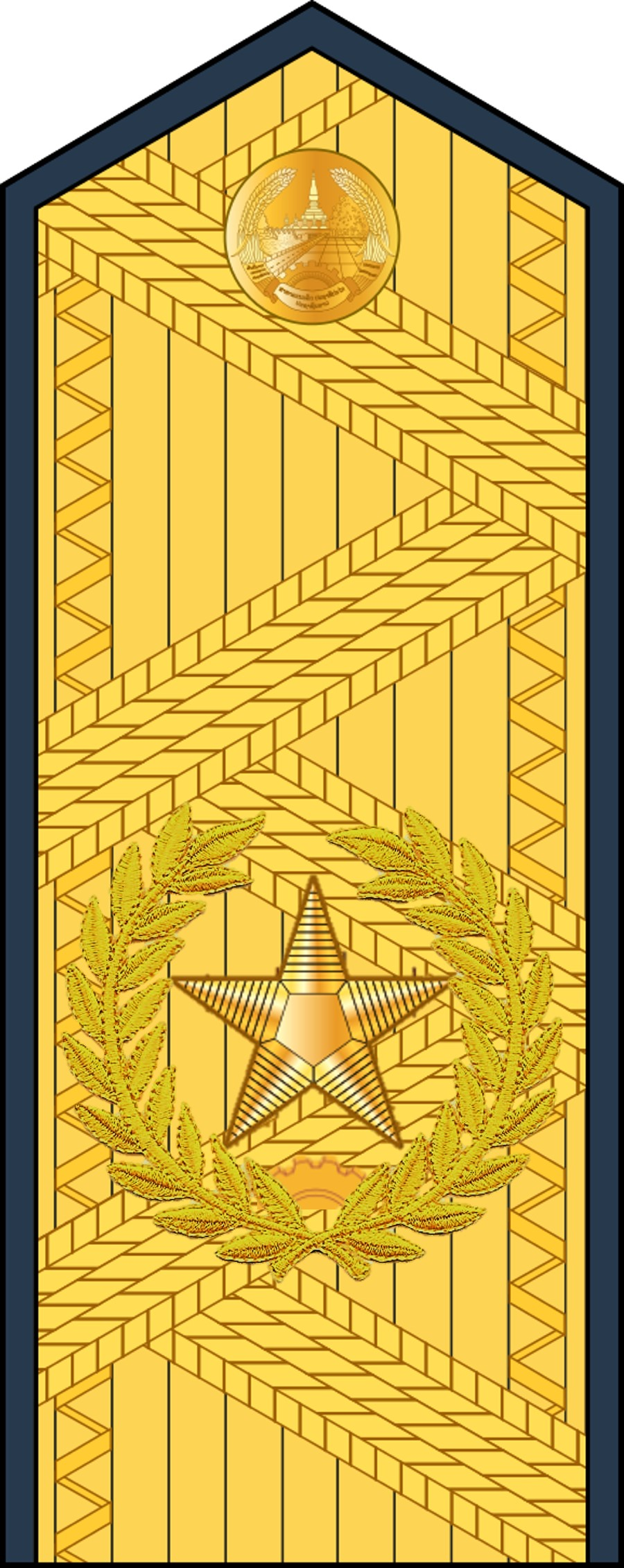
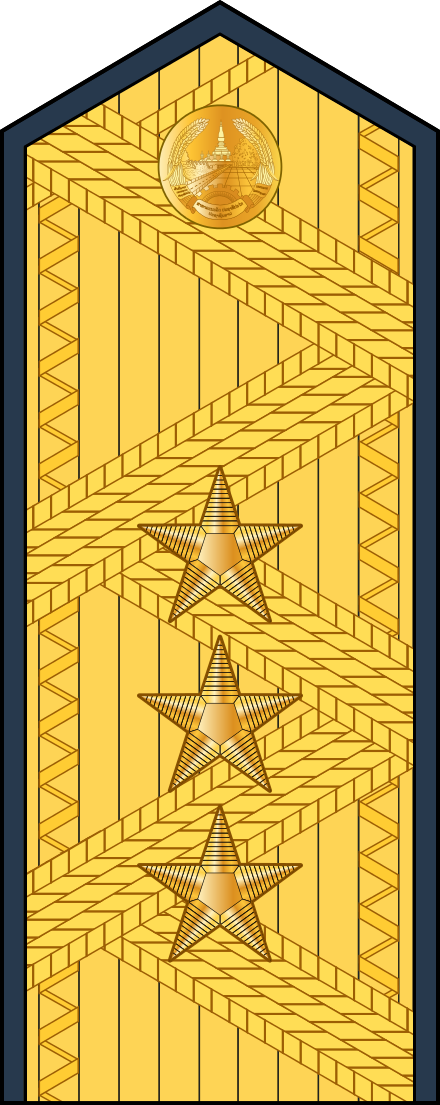
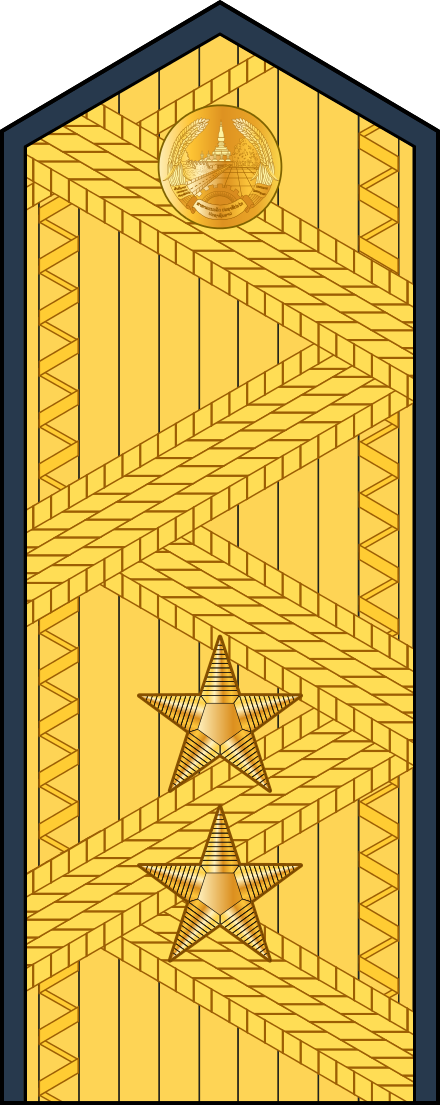
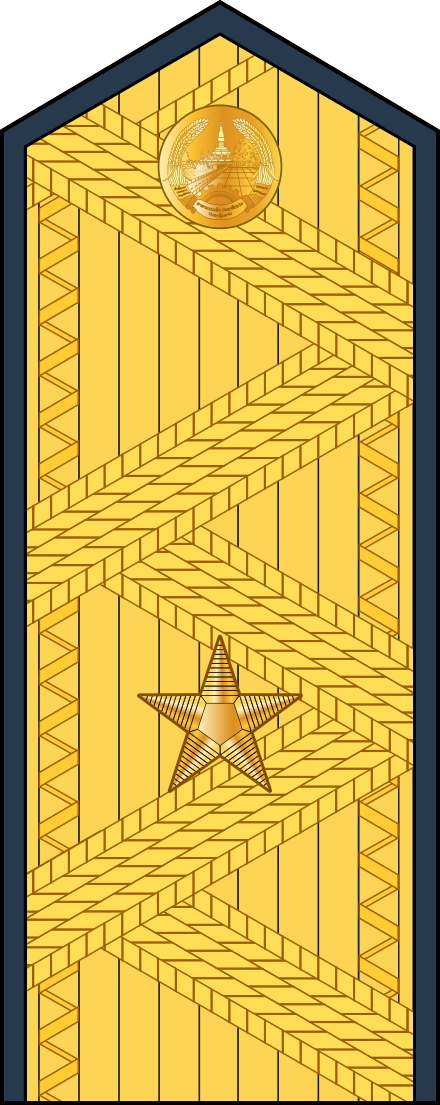
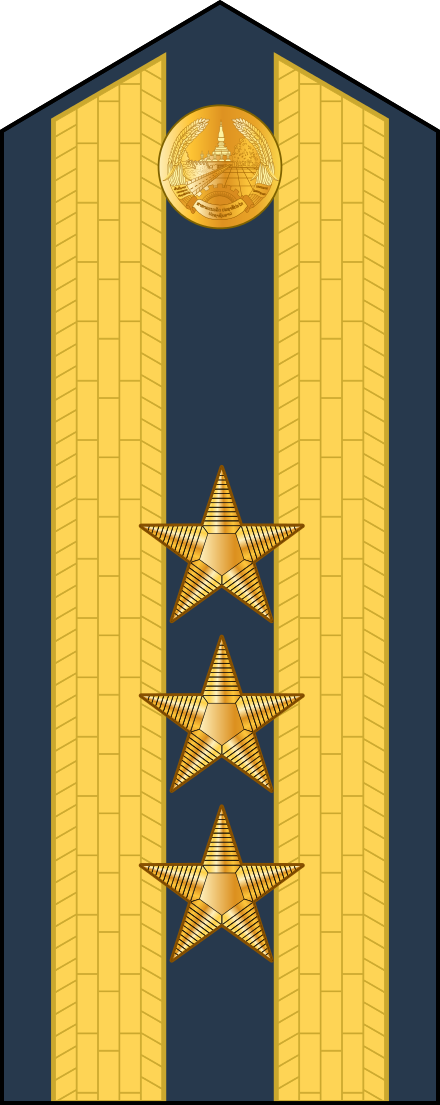
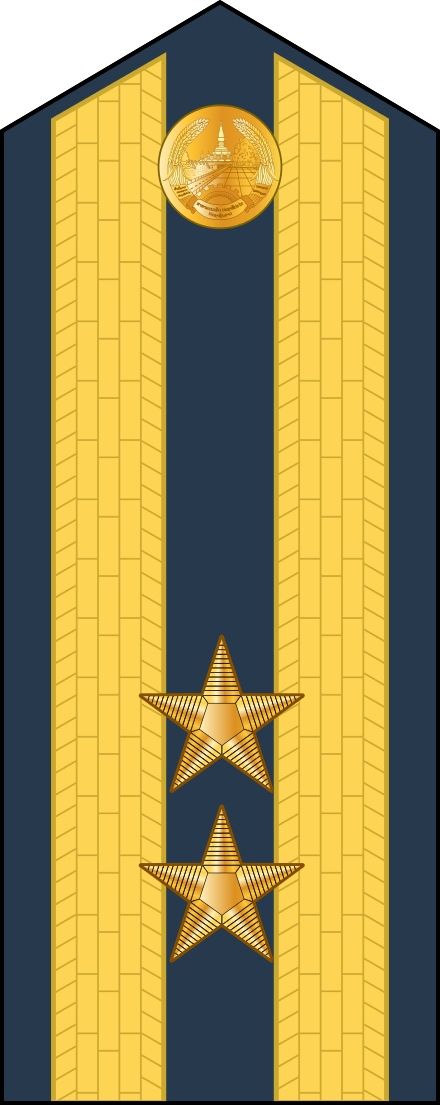
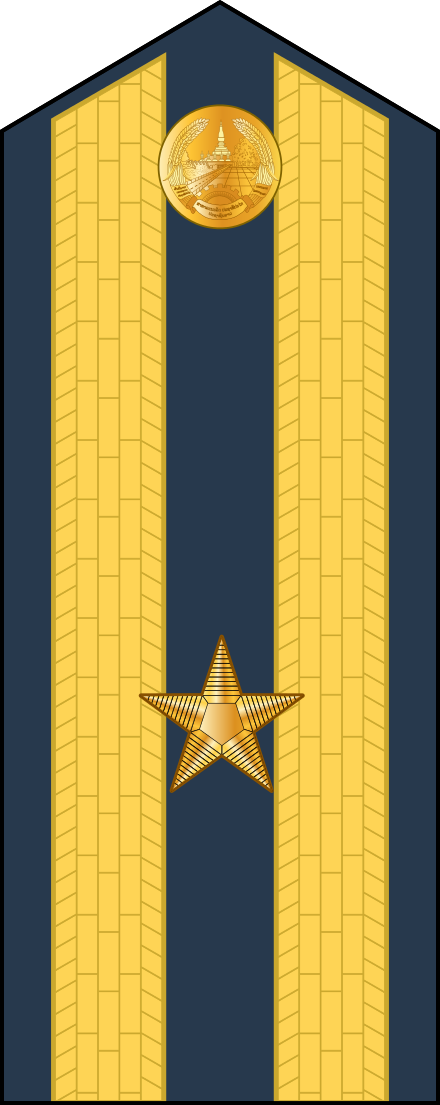
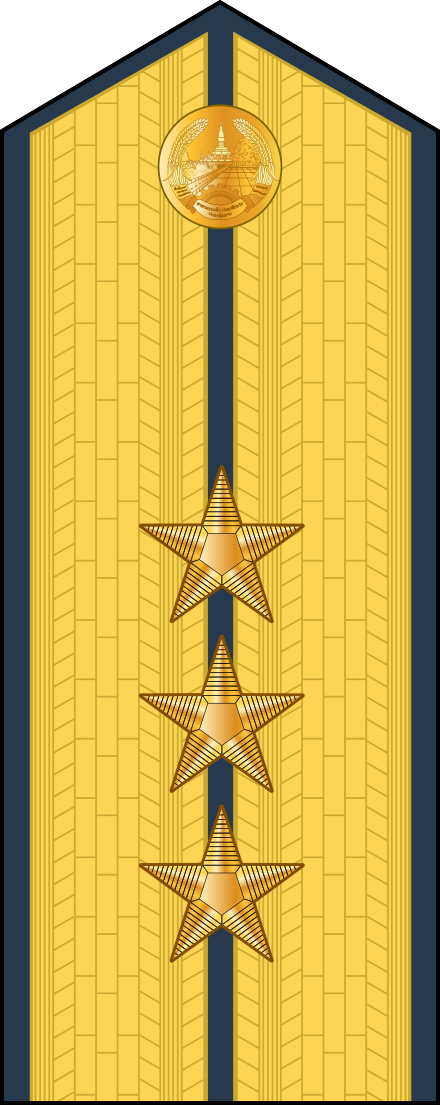
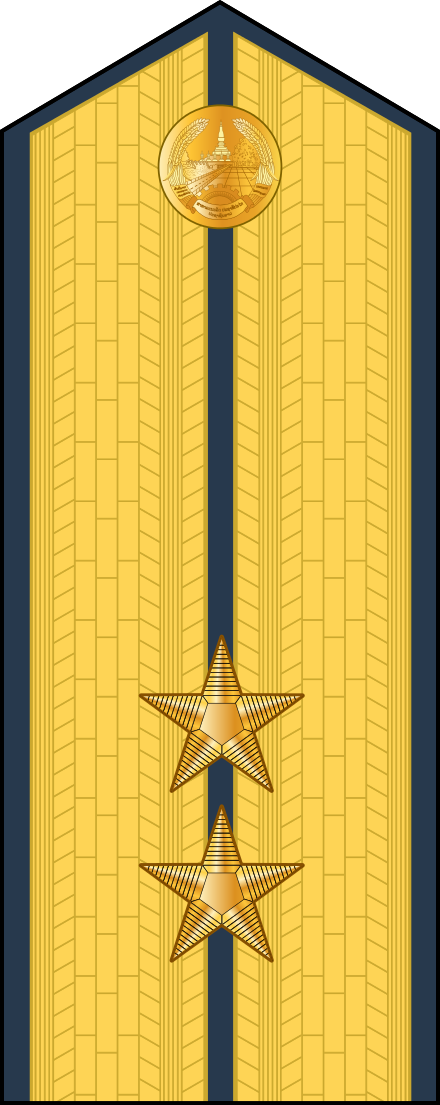
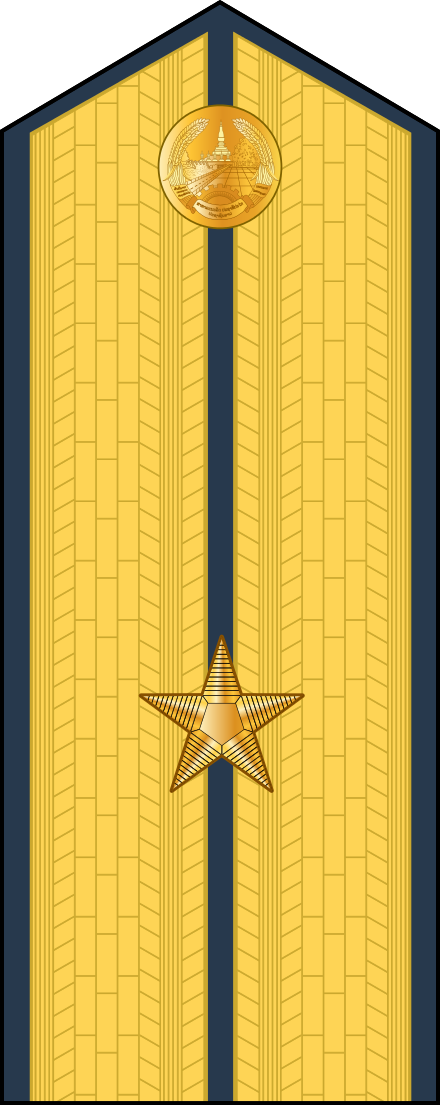
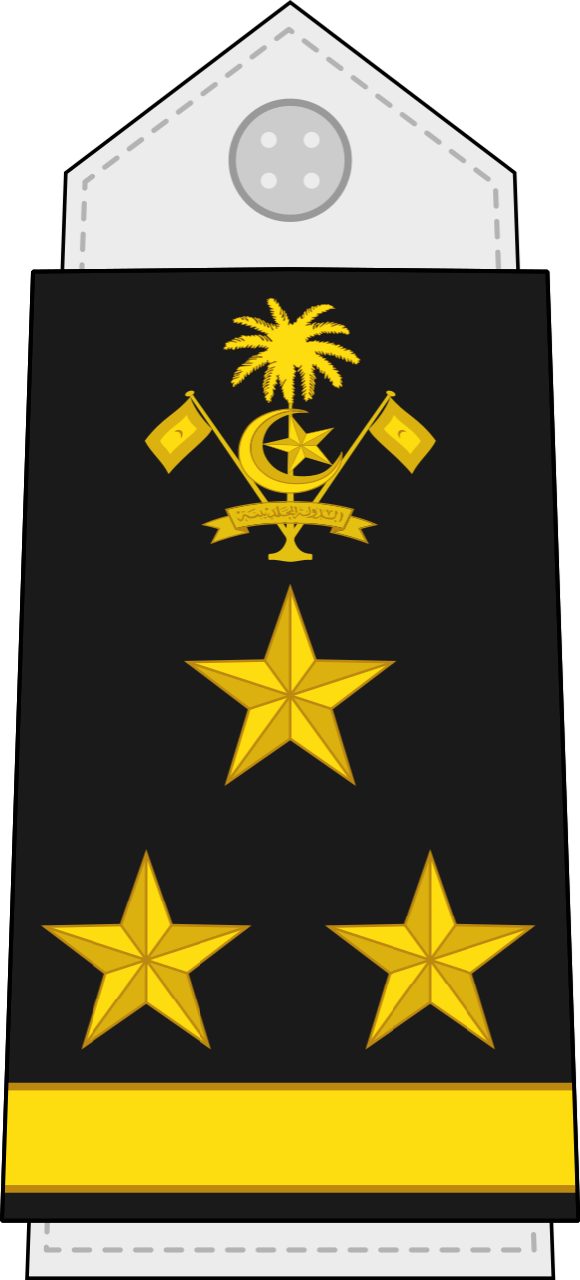
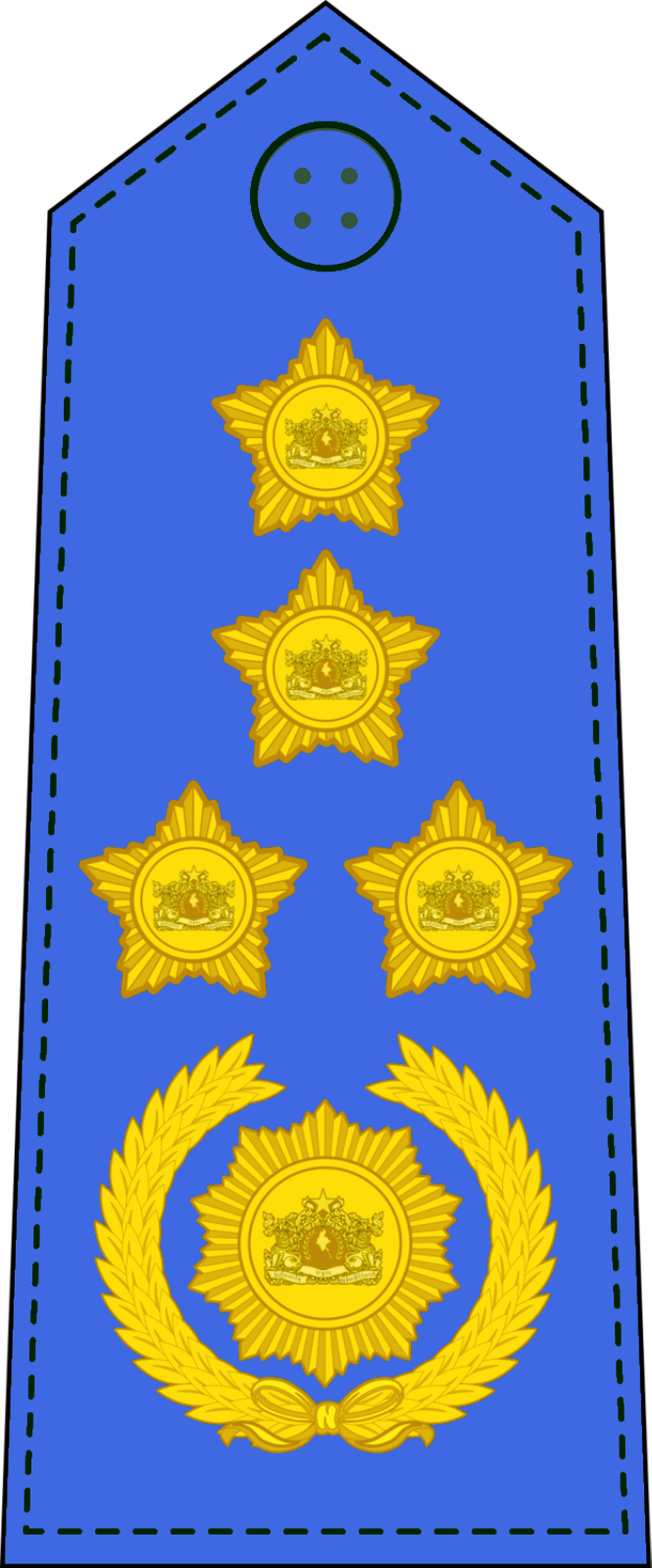
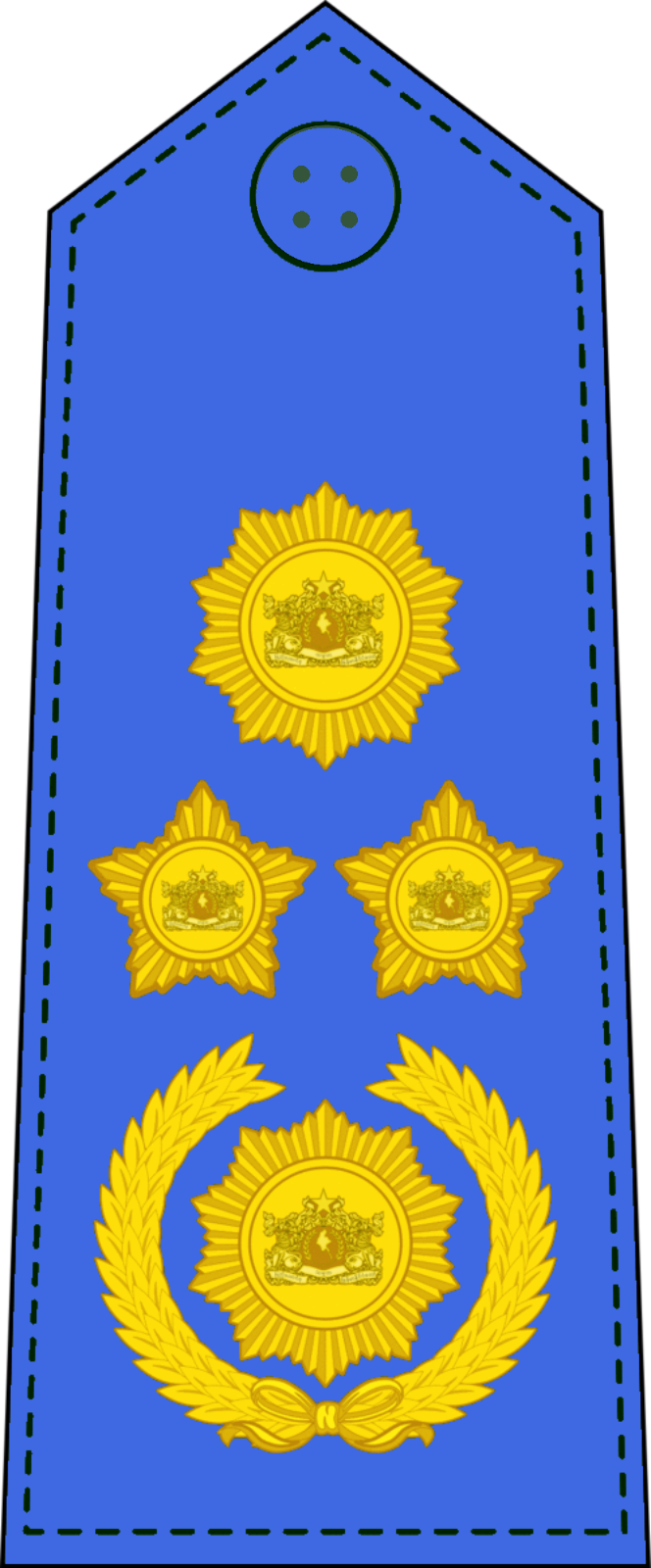
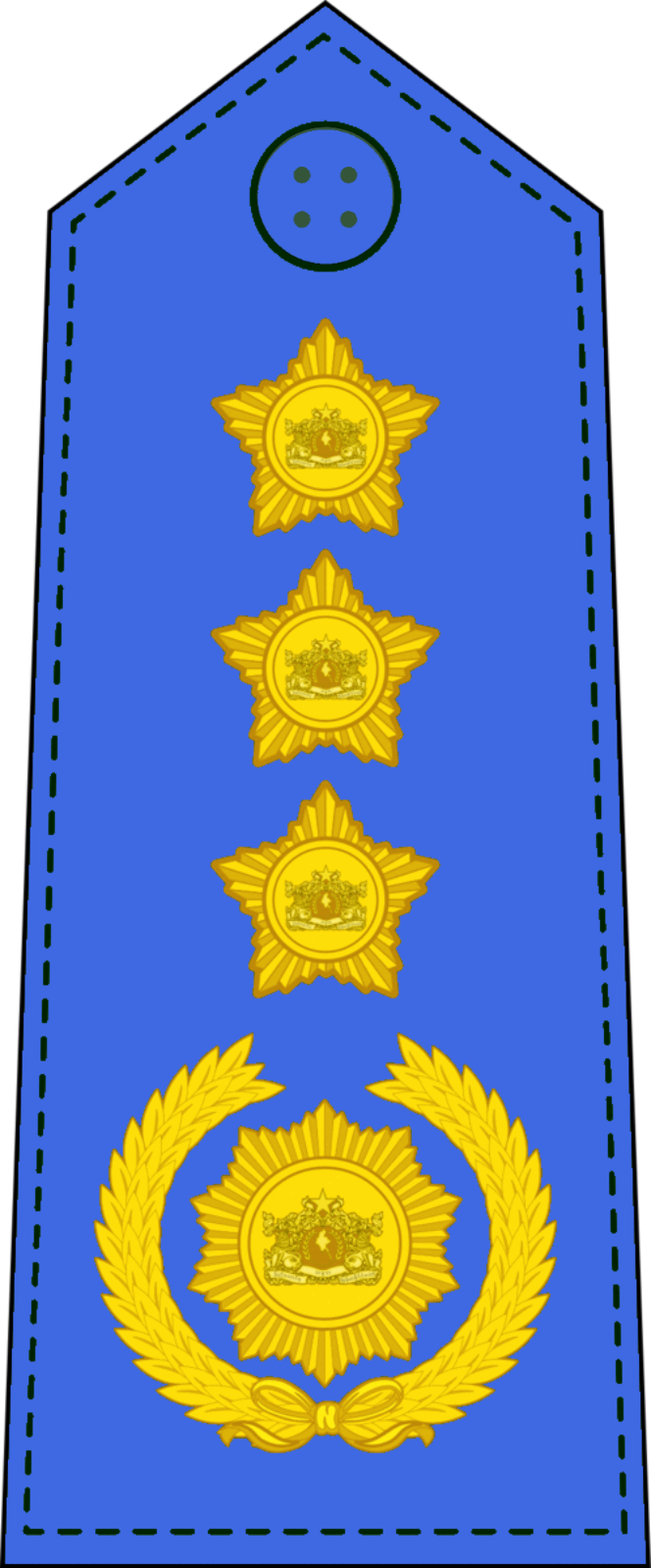
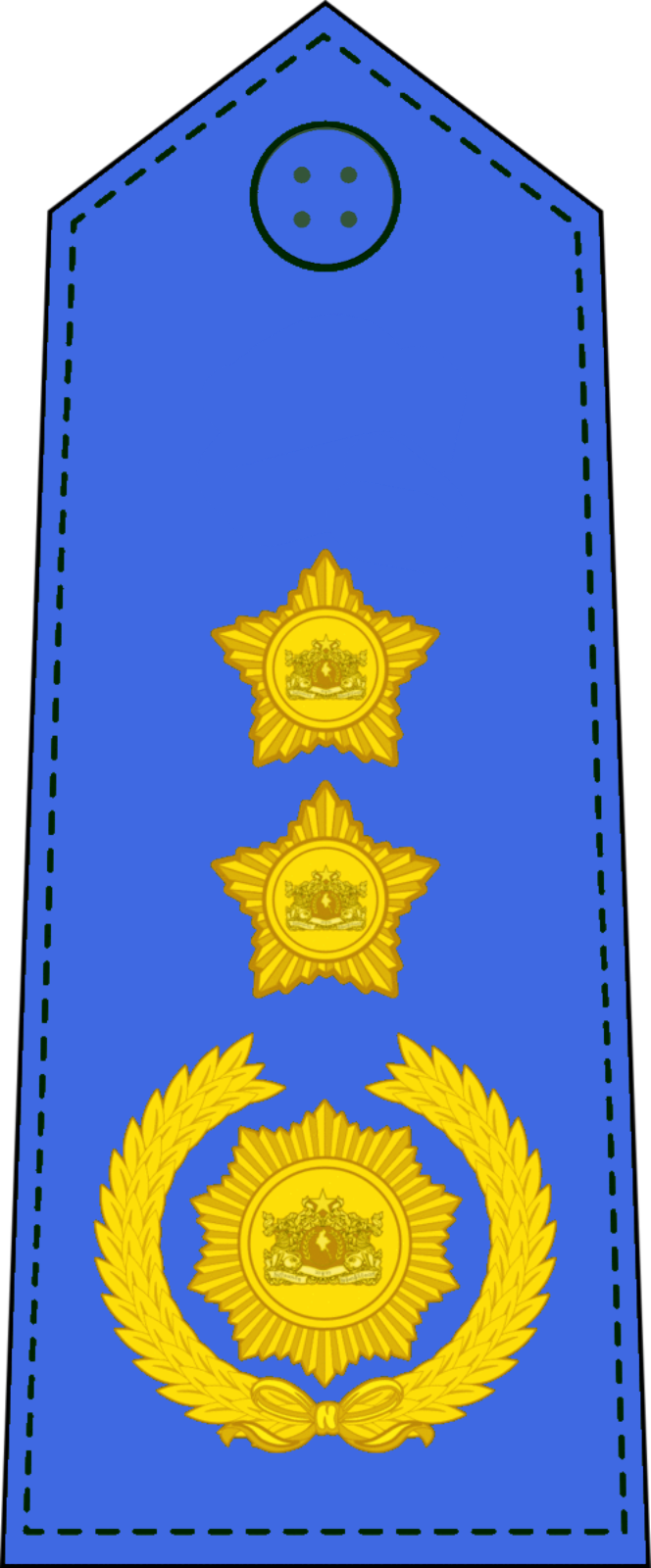
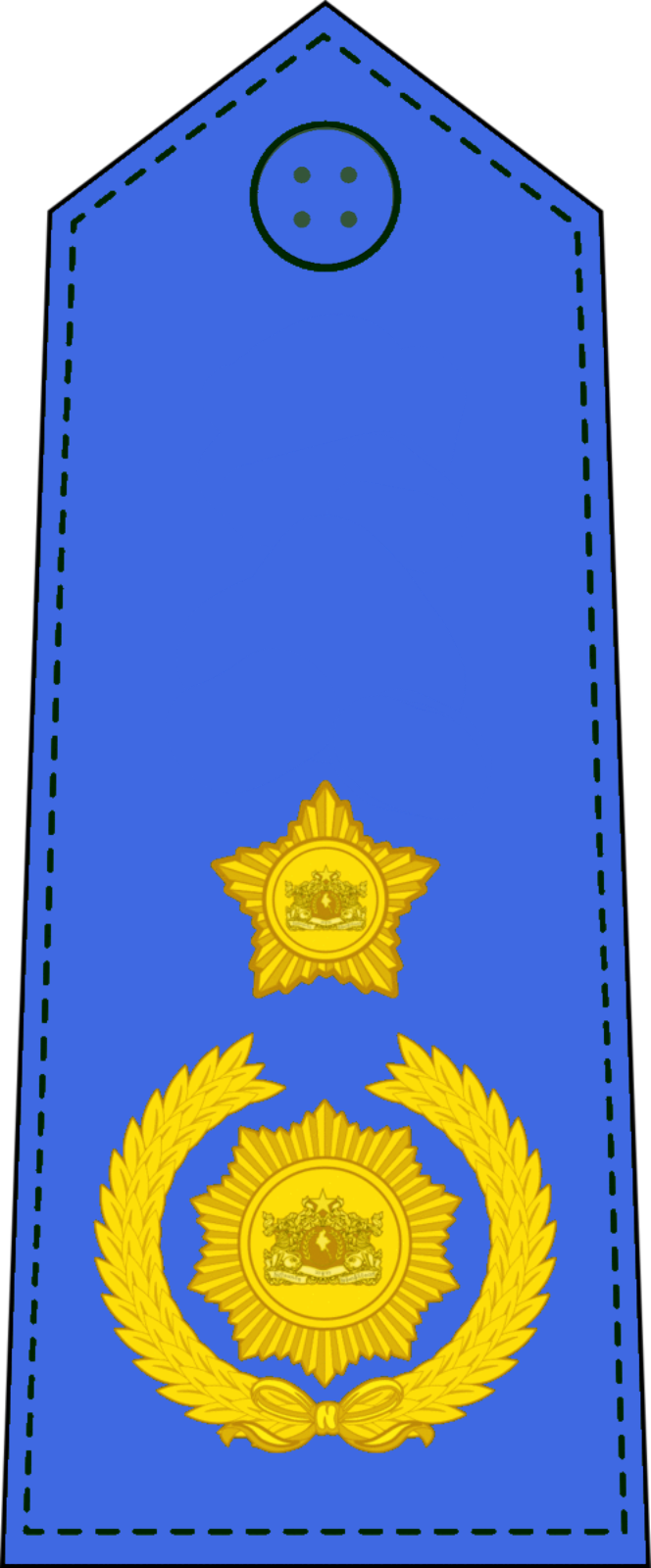
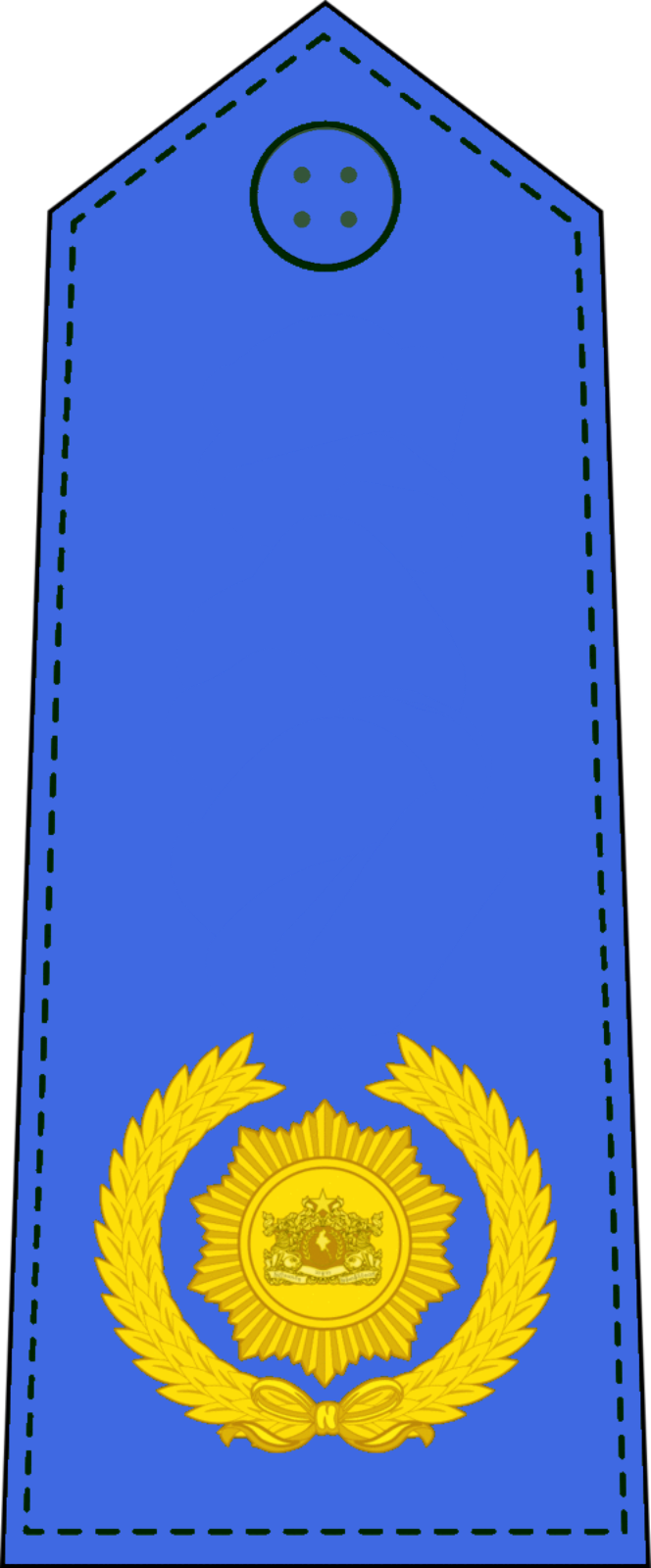
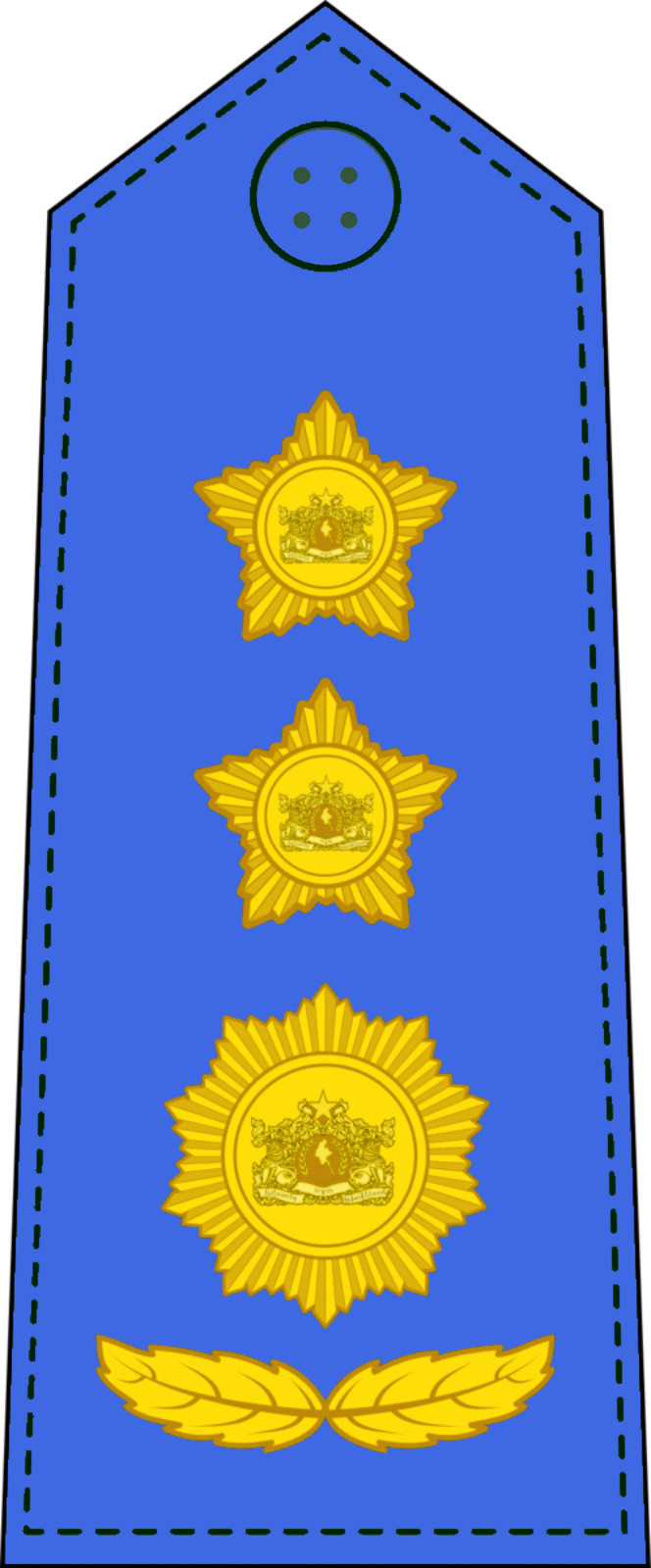
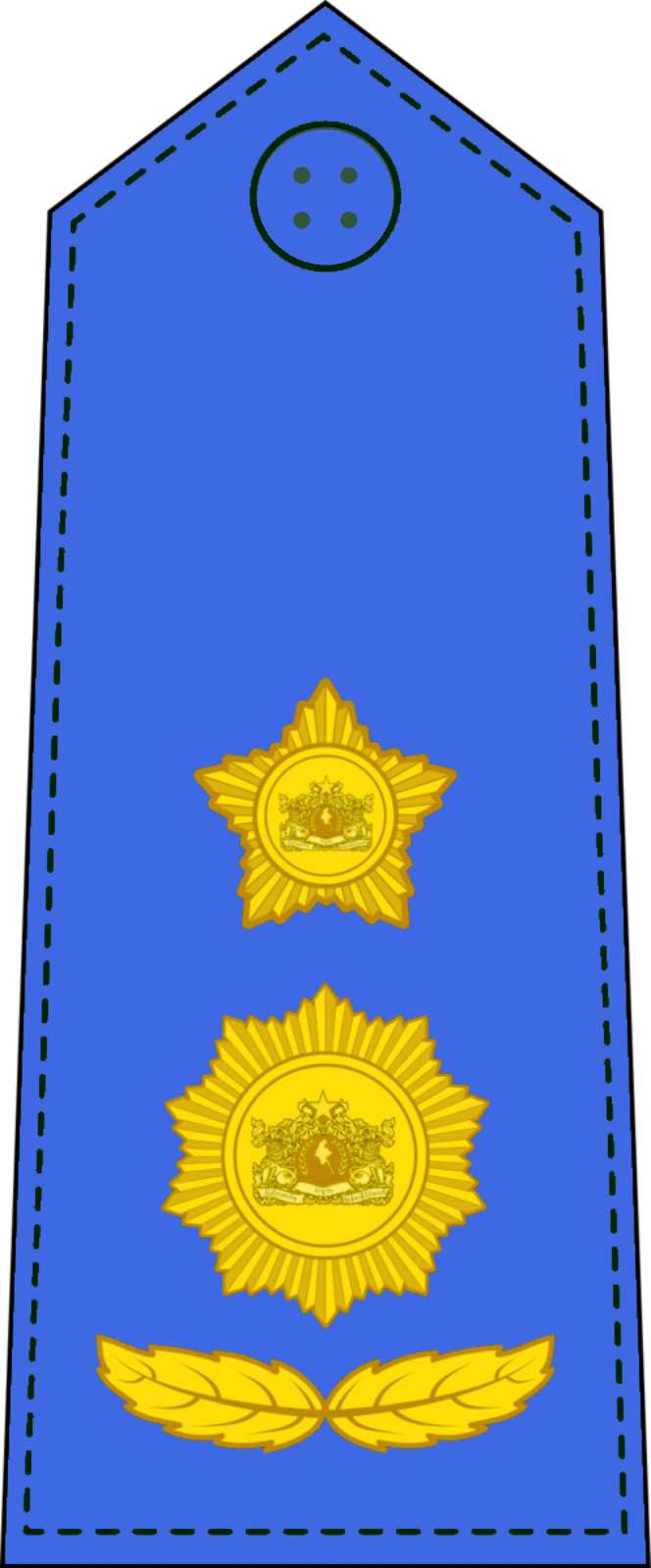
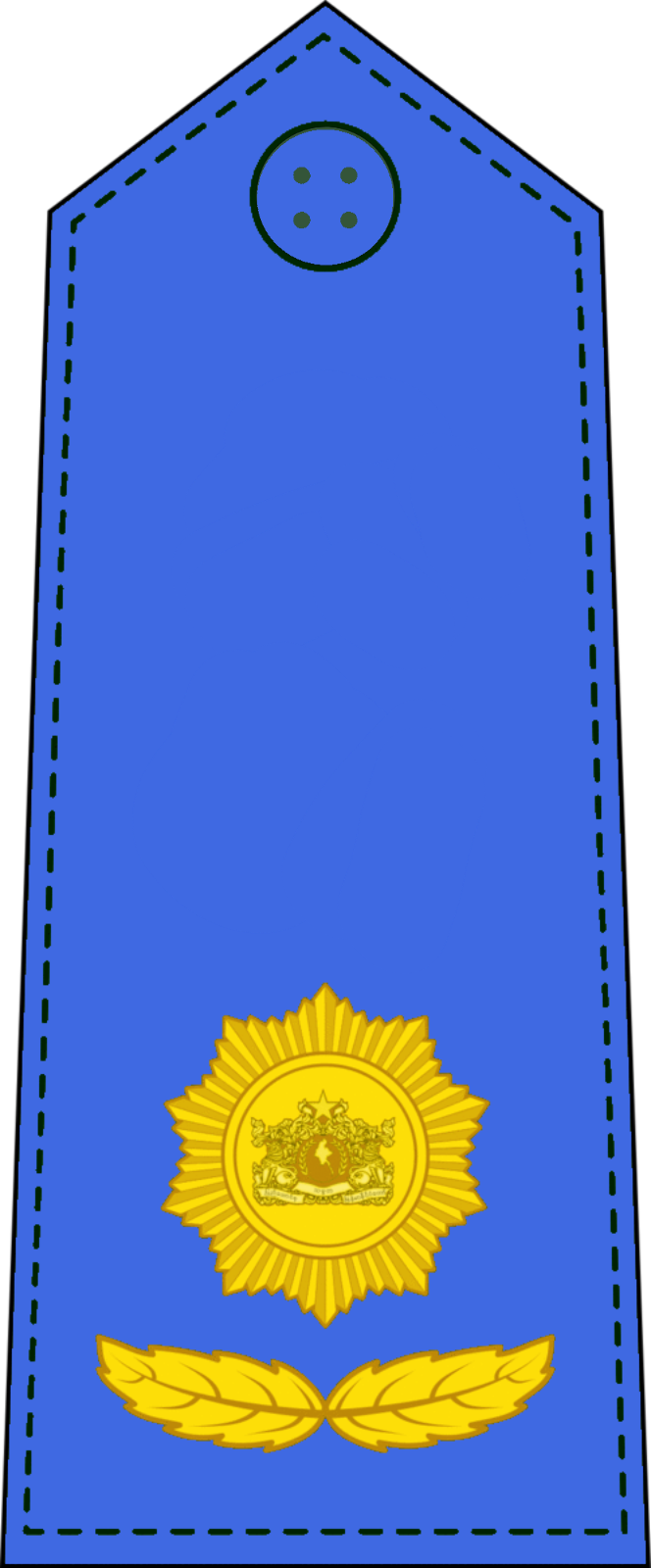
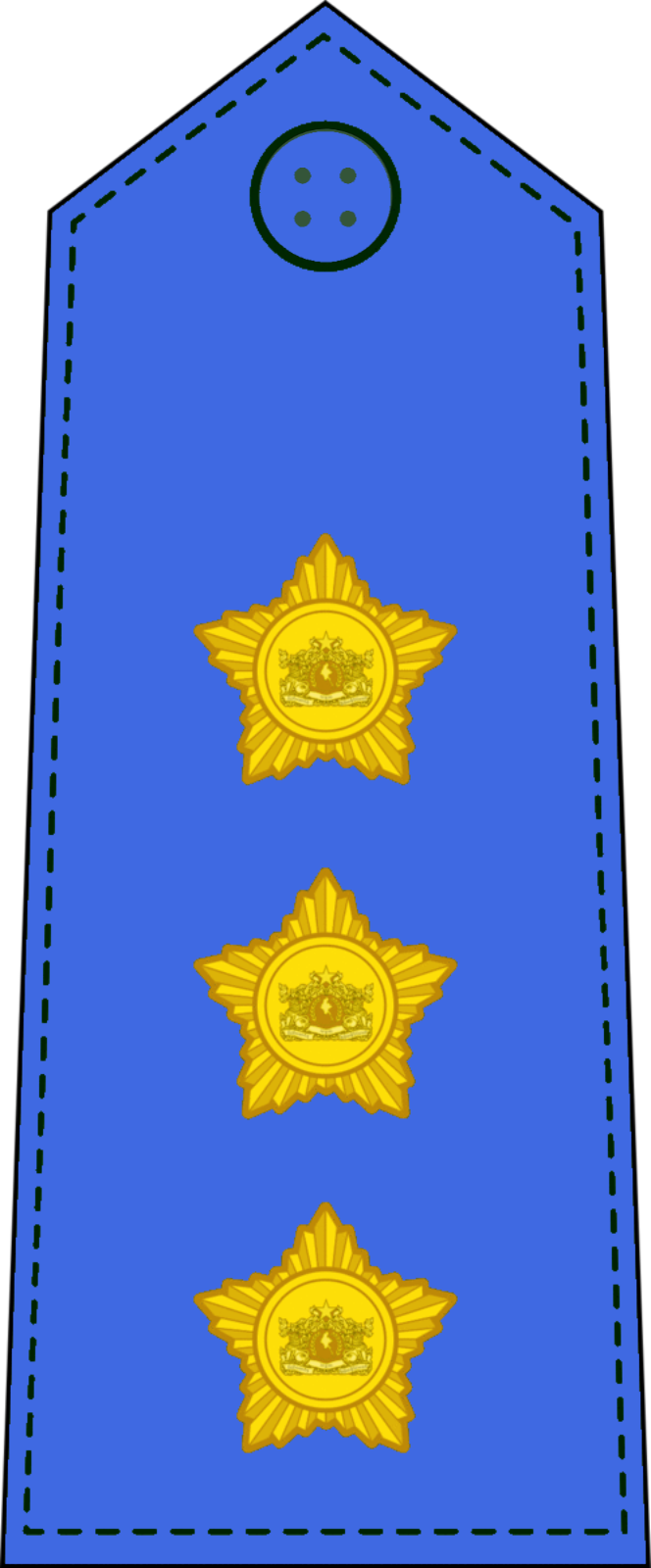
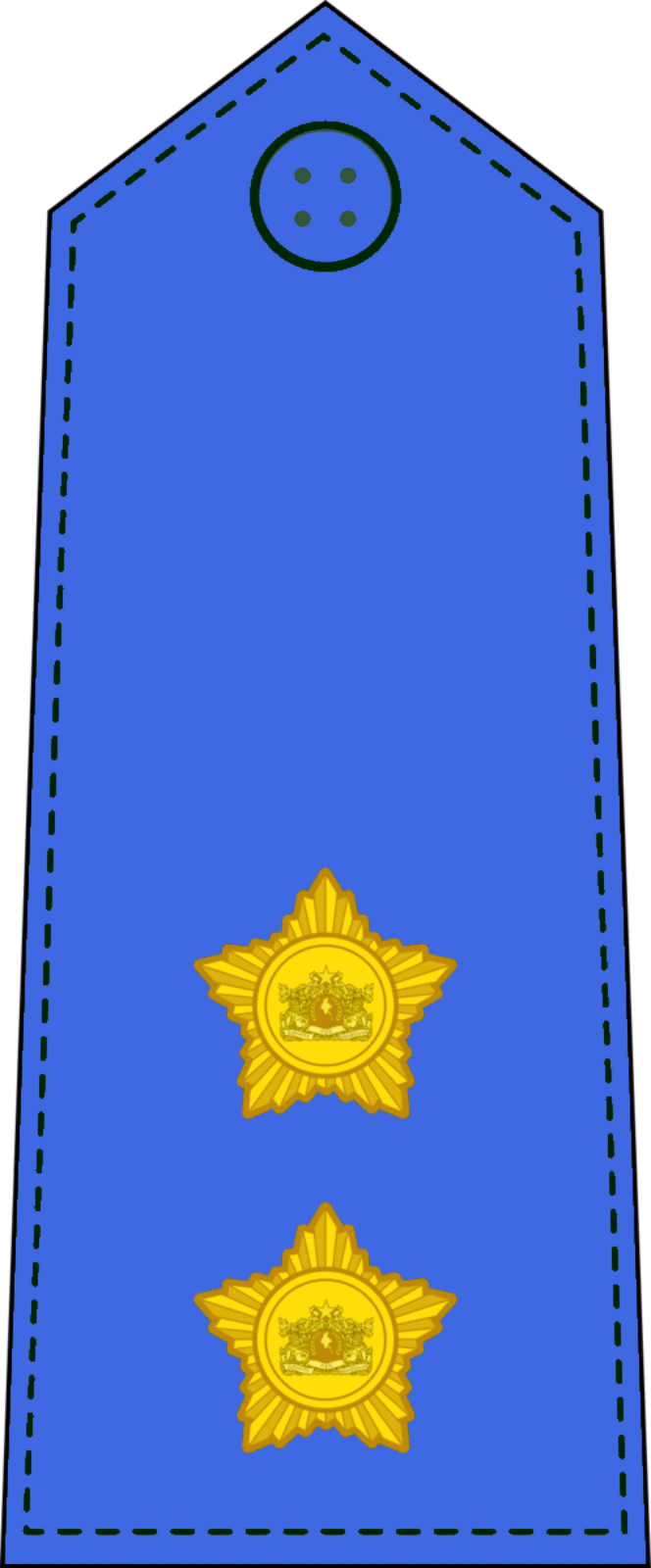
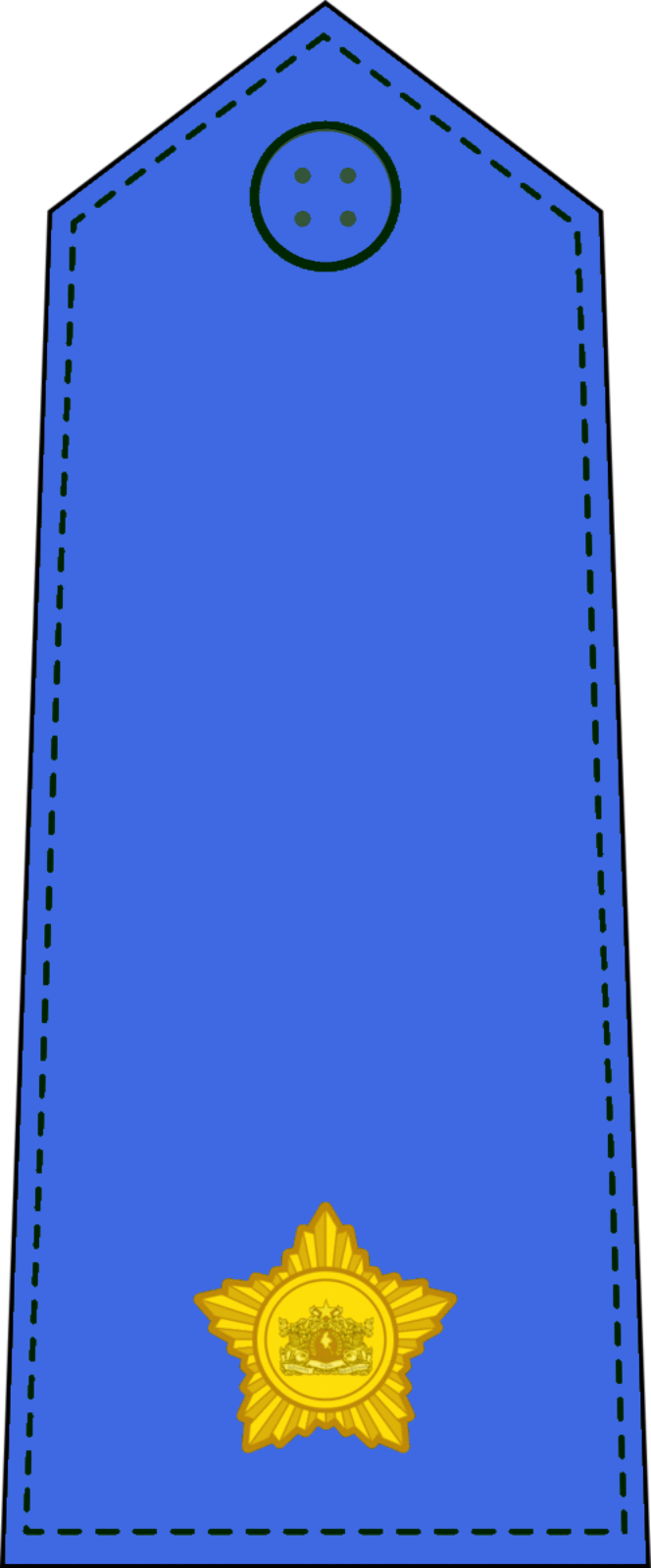
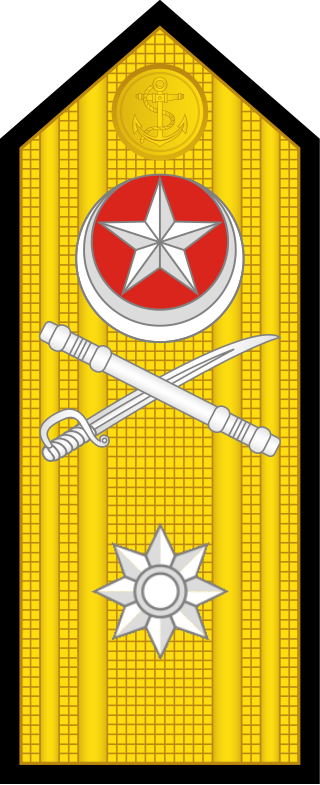
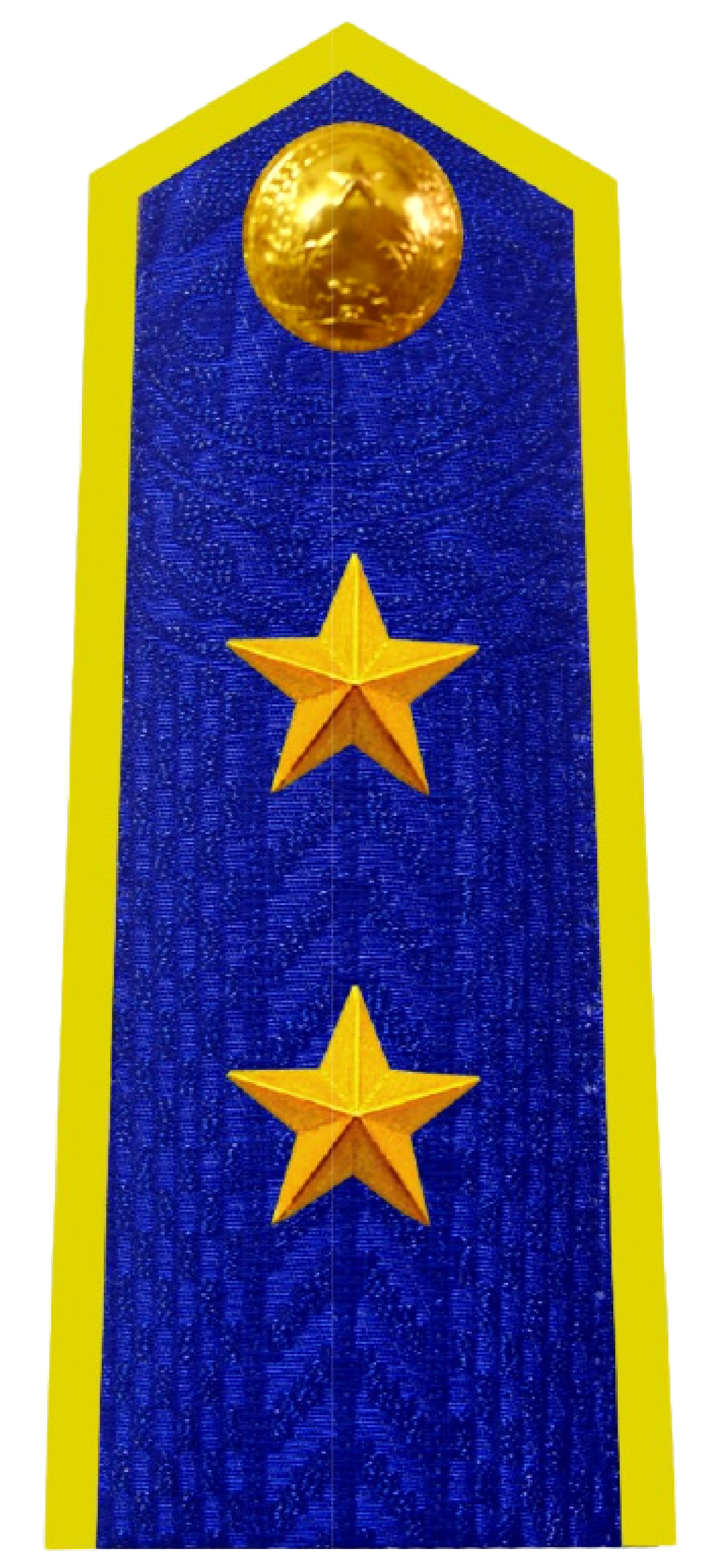
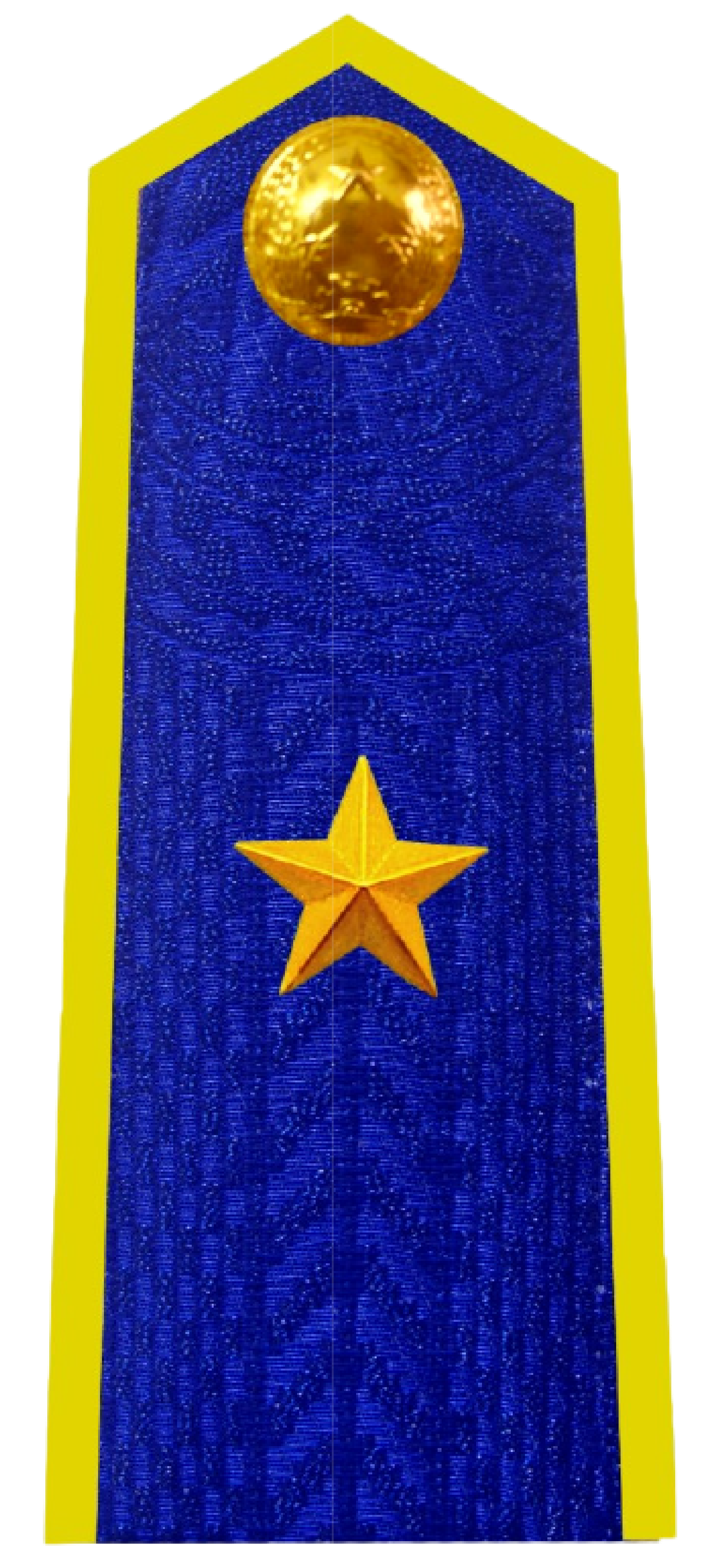
Rank group	General / flag officers							Senior officers					Junior officers
Islamic Emirate of Afghanistan	No navy
Armenia	No navy
Azerbaijani Navy
Azerbaijani Navy				Admiral	Vitse-admiral	Kontr-admiral		Birinci dərəcəli kapitan		Ikinci dərəcəli kapitan		Üçüncü dərəcəli kapitan	Kapitan-leytenant	Baş leytenant	Leytenant	Kiçik leytenant
Royal Bahraini Naval Force
Royal Bahraini Naval Force	مشیر; Mushir	فريق أول; Fariq 'awal		فريق; Fariq	لواء; Liwa	عميد; Amid		عقيد; Aqid		مقدم; Muqaddam		رائد; Ra'id	نقيب; Naqib	ملازم أول; Mulazim awwal		ملازم; Mulazim
Bangladesh Navy
Bangladesh Navy		এ্যাডমিরাল; Aeḍmirāl		ভাইস এ্যাডমিরাল; Bhā'is aeḍamirāl	রিয়ার এ্যাডমিরাল; Riẏār aeḍamirāl	কমোডোর; Kômōḍōr		ক্যাপ্টেন; Kaepṭēn		কমান্ডার; Kômānḍār		লেফটেন্যান্ট কমান্ডার; Lēphṭēnānṭ kômānḍār	লেফটেন্যান্ট; Lēphṭēnānṭ	সাব-লেফটেন্যান্ট; Sāb-lēphṭēnānṭ	এ্যাক্টিং সাব-লেফটেন্যান্ট; Ēyākṭiṁ sāb-lēphṭēn'yānṭ	মিডশিপম্যান; Miḍśipmaen
Bhutan	No navy
Royal Brunei Navy
Royal Brunei Navy	Laksamana armada	Laksamana		Laksamana madya	Laksamana muda	Laksamana pertama		Kepten		Komander		Leftenan komander	Leftenan	Leftenan madya		Leftenan muda
Royal Cambodian Navy
Royal Cambodian Navy		នាយឧត្ដមនាវី Neay Utdamneavi		ឧត្ដមនាវីឯក; Utdamneavi ek	ឧត្តមនាវីទោ Utdamneavi tou	ឧត្តមនាវីត្រី Utdamneavi trei		វរនាវីឯក; Veareaneavi ek		វរនាវីទោ Veareaneavi tou		វរនាវីត្រី Veareaneavi trei	អនុនាវីឯក; Anuneavi ek	អនុនាវីទោ Anuneavi tou		អនុនាវីត្រី Anuneavi trei
PLA Navy
PLA Navy		海军上将; Hǎijūn shàngjiàng		海军中将; Hǎijūn zhōngjiàng	海军少将; Hǎijūn shàojiàng			海军大校; Hǎijūn dàxiào	海军上校; Hǎijūn shàngxiào	海军中校; Hǎijūn zhōngxiào		海军少校; Hǎijūn shàoxiào	海军上尉; Hǎijūn shàngwèi	海军中尉; Hǎijūn zhōngwèi		海军少尉; Hǎijūn shàowèi
Republic of China Navy
Republic of China Navy		一級上將; It-kip siōng-chiòng	二級上將; Jī-kip siōng-chiòng	中將; Tiong-chiòng	少將; Siáu-chiòng			上校; Siōng-hāu		中校; Tiong-hāu		少校; Siáu-hāu	上尉; Siōng-ùi	中尉; Tiong-ùi		少尉; Siáu-ùi
Republic of China Marine Corps
Republic of China Marine Corps		二級上將; Jī-kip siōng-chiòng		中將; Tiong-chiòng	少將; Siáu-chiòng			上校; Siōng-hāu		中校; Tiong-hāu		少校; Siáu-hāu	上尉; Siōng-ùi	中尉; Tiong-ùi		少尉; Siáu-ùi
Indian Navy
Indian Navy		Admiral एडमिरल		Vice admiral वाइस एडमिरल	Rear admiral रियर एडमिरल	Commodore कमोडोर		Captain कैप्टन		Commander कमांडर		Lieutenant commander लेफ़्टिनेंट कमांडर	Lieutenant लेफ्टिनेंट	Sub-lieutenant सब लेफ्टिनेंट		Midshipman मिडशिपमैन
Rank group	General / flag officers							Senior officers					Junior officers
Indonesian Navy
Indonesian Navy	Laksamana besar	Laksamana		Laksamana madya	Laksamana muda	Laksamana pertama		Kolonel		Letnan kolonel		Mayor	Kapten	Letnan satu		Letnan dua
Iranian Navy
Iranian Navy		دریابد; Daryabod		دریاسالار; Daryasalar	دریابان; Daryaban	دریادار; Daryadar	دریادار دوم; Daryadar dovom	ناخدا یکم; Nakhoda yekom		ناخدا دوم; Nakhoda dovom		ناخدا سوم; Nakhoda sevom	ناوسروان; Navsarvan	ناوبان یکم; Navban yekom	ناوبان دوم; Navban dovom	ناوبان سوم; Navban sevom
Iraqi Navy
Iraqi Navy	مشیر; Mushir	فريق أول; Fariq 'awal		فريق; Fariq	لواء; Liwa	عميد; Amid		عقيد; Aqid		مقدم; Muqaddam		رائد; Ra'id	نقيب; Naqib	ملازم أول; Mulazim awwal		ملازم; Mulazim
Israeli Navy
Israeli Navy				רב-אלוף; Rav aluf	אלוף; Aluf	תת-אלוף; Tat aluf		אלוף משנה; Aluf mishne		סגן-אלוף; Sgan aluf		רב סרן; Rav seren	סרן; Seren	סגן; Segen		סגן-משנה; Segen mishne
Japan Maritime Self-Defense Force
Japan Maritime Self-Defense Force		幕僚長たる海将; Bakuryōchō-taru-kaishō		海将; Kaishō	海将補; Kaishō-ho			1等海佐; Ittō kaisa		2等海佐; Nitō kaisa		3等海佐; Santō kaisa	1等海尉; Ittō kaii	2等海尉; Nitō kaii	3等海尉; Santō kaii	准海尉; Jun kaii
Royal Jordanian Navy
Royal Jordanian Navy	مشیر; Mushir	فريق أول; Fariq 'awal		فريق; Fariq	لواء; Liwa	عميد; Amid		عقيد; Aqid		مقدم; Muqaddam		رائد; Ra'id	نقيب; Naqib	ملازم أول; Mulazim awwal		ملازم; Mulazim
Kazakh Naval Forces
Kazakh Naval Forces	Жоғарғы Бас қолбасшының Joğarğı Bas qolbasşınıñ			Адмирал; Admïral	Вице-адмирал; Vice-admïral	Контр-адмирал; Kontr-admïral		Бірінші дәрежелі капитан Birinşi därejeli kapïtan		Екінші дәрежелі капитан Ekinşi därejeli kapïtan		Үшінші дәрежелі капитан Üşinşi därejeli kapïtan	Капитан-лейтенант; Kapïtan-leytenant	Аға лейтенант Ağa leytenant		Лейтенант; Leytenant
Korean People's Navy
인민군원수; Inmingun-wonsu	차수; Chasu	대장; Daejang	상장; Sangjang		중장; Chungjang	소장; Sojang	대좌; Daechwa	상좌; Sangjwa	중좌; Chungjwa		소좌; Sojwa		대위; Taewi	상위; Sangwi	중위; Chungwi	소위; Sowi
Republic of Korea Navy
Republic of Korea Navy	원수; Wonsu	대장; Daejang		중장; Jungjang	소장; Sojang	준장; Junjang		대령; Daeryeong		중령; Jungnyeong		소령; Soryeong	대위; Daewi	중위; Jungwi		소위; Sowi
Republic of Korea Marine Corps
Republic of Korea Marine Corps		대장; Daejang		중장; Jungjang	소장; Sojang	준장; Junjang		대령; Daeryeong		중령; Jungnyeong		소령; Soryeong	대위; Daewi	중위; Jungwi		소위; Sowi
Kuwait Navy
Kuwait Navy		فريق أول; Fariq 'awal		فريق; Fariq	لواء; Liwa	عميد; Amid		عقيد; Aqid		مقدم; Muqaddam		رائد; Ra'id	نقيب; Naqib	ملازم أول; Mulazim awwal		ملازم; Mulazim
Kyrgyzstan	No navy
Rank group	General / flag officers							Senior officers					Junior officers
(Laos) Lao People's Navy
(Laos) Lao People's Navy		ພົນເອກ; Phonoek		ພົນໂທ; Phonoth	ພົນຕີ Phon ti	ພົນຈັດຕະວາ; Phonchadtauaa		ພັນເອກ; Phanoek		ພັນໂທ; Phanoth		ພັນຕີ Phan ti	ຮ້ອຍເອກ; Honyoek	ຮ້ອຍໂທ; Hony oth		ຮ້ອຍຕີ Hony ti
Lebanese Navy
Lebanese Navy				عماد; Eimad	لواء; Liwa	عميد; Amid		عقيد; Aqid		مقدم; Muqaddam		رائد; Ra'id	نقيب; Naqib	ملازم أول; Mulazim awwal		ملازم; Mulazim
Royal Malaysian Navy
Royal Malaysian Navy	Laksamana armada	Laksamana		Laksamana madya	Laksamana muda	Laksamana pertama		Kepten		Komander		Leftenan komander	Leftenan	Leftenan madya		Leftenan muda
Maldivian Coast Guard
Maldivian Coast Guard						ބްރިގޭޑިއަރ ޖެނެރަލް Brigeydiar jeneral		ކާނަލް Kaanal		ލެފްޓިނަންޓް ކާނަލް Leftinant kaanal		މޭޖަރ; Meyjar	ކެޕްޓަން Keptan	ފަސްޓް ލެފްޓިނަންޓް Fast leftinant		ލެފްޓިނަންޓް Leftinant
Mongolia	No navy
Myanmar Navy
Myanmar Navy	ဗိုလ်ချုပ်မှူးကြီး bogyok hmūgyī	ဒုတိယ ဗိုလ်ချုပ်မှူးကြီး dụtịyạ bogyok hmūgyī	ဗိုလ်ချုပ်ကြီး bogyok kyī	ဒုတိယ ဗိုလ်ချုပ်ကြီး dụtịyạ bogyok kyī	ဗိုလ်ချုပ် bogyok	ဗိုလ်မှူးချုပ် bohmūgyok		ဗိုလ်မှူးကြီး bohmūgyī		ဒုတိယ ဗိုလ်မှူးကြီး dụtịyạ bohmūgyī		ဗိုလ်မှူး bohmū	ဗိုလ်ကြီး bogyī	ဗိုလ် bo		ဒုတိယ ဗိုလ် dụtịyạ bo
Nepal	No navy
Royal Navy of Oman
Royal Navy of Oman	مشیر; Mushir	فريق أول; Fariq 'awal		فريق; Fariq	لواء; Liwa	عميد; Amid		عقيد; Aqid		مقدم; Muqaddam		رائد; Ra'id	نقيب; Naqib	ملازم أول; Mulazim awwal		ملازم; Mulazim
Pakistan Navy
Pakistan Navy		Admiral ایڈمرل		Vice admiral وائس ایڈمرل	Rear admiral بحریہ کا امیر	Commodore کموڈور		Captain کپتان		Commander کمانڈر		Lieutenant commander لیفٹیننٹ کمانڈر	Lieutenant لیفٹیننٹ	Sub-lieutenant سب لیفٹیننٹ		Midshipman مڈ شپ مین
Philippine Navy
Philippine Navy		Admiral		Vice admiral	Rear admiral	Commodore		Captain		Commander		Lieutenant commander	Lieutenant	Lieutenant junior grade		Ensign
Qatari Emiri Navy
Qatari Emiri Navy		فريق أول; Fariq 'awal		فريق; Fariq	لواء; Liwa	عميد; Amid		عقيد; Aqid		مقدم; Muqaddam		رائد; Ra'id	نقيب; Naqib	ملازم أول; Mulazim awwal		ملازم; Mulazim
Russian Navy
Russian Navy		Адмирал флота Admiral flota		Адмирал; Admiral	Вице-адмирал; Vitse-admiral	Контр-адмирал; Contre-admiral		Капитан 1-го ранга Kapitan 1-go ranga		Капитан 2-го ранга Kapitan 2-go ranga		Капитан 3-го ранга Kapitan 3-go ranga	Капитан-лейтенант; Kapitan-leytenant	Старший лейтенант Starshiy leytenant	Лейтенант; Leytenant	Младший лейтенант Mladshiy leytenant
Rank group	General / flag officers							Senior officers					Junior officers
Royal Saudi Navy
Royal Saudi Navy		فريق أول; Fariq 'awal		فريق; Fariq	لواء; Liwa	عميد; Amid		عقيد; Aqid		مقدم; Muqaddam		رائد; Ra'id	نقيب; Naqib	ملازم أول; Mulazim awwal		ملازم; Mulazim
Republic of Singapore Navy		No insignia yet
Republic of Singapore Navy		Admiral		Vice admiral	Rear admiral	Rear admiral (junior grade)		Colonel		Senior lieutenant colonel	Lieutenant colonel	Major	Captain	Lieutenant		Second lieutenant
Sri Lanka Navy
Sri Lanka Navy	Admiral of the fleet	Admiral		Vice admiral	Rear admiral	Commodore		Captain		Commander		Lieutenant commander	Lieutenant	Sub-lieutenant		Midshipman
Syrian Navy
Syrian Navy	فريق; Fariq	عماد أول; Eimad 'awal		عماد; Eimad	لواء; Alliwa'	عميد; Amid		عقيد; Aqid		مقدم; Muqaddam		رائد; Ra'id	نقيب; Naqib	ملازم أول; Mulazim awwal		ملازم; Mulazim
Tajikistan	No navy
Royal Thai Navy
Royal Thai Navy	จอมพลเรือ; Chom phon ruea	พลเรือเอก; Phon ruea ek		พลเรือโท; Phon ruea tho	พลเรือตรี Phon ruea tri			นาวาเอก; Nawa ek		นาวาโท; Nawa tho		นาวาตรี Nawa tri	เรือเอก; Ruea ek	เรือโท; Ruea tho		เรือตรี Ruea tri
Timor-Leste Navy
Timor-Leste Navy								Capitão de Mar e Guerra		Capitão de Fragata		Capitão-tenente	Primeiro-tenente	Segundo-tenente		Guarda-marinha
Turkmen Naval Forces
Turkmen Naval Forces		Flot admiraly		Admiral	Wise-admiral	Kontr-admiral		1-nji derejeli kapitan		2-nji derejeli kapitan		3-nji derejeli kapitan	Kapitan-leýtenant	Uly leýtenant	Leýtenant	Kiçi leýtenant
United Arab Emirates Navy
United Arab Emirates Navy		فريق أول; Fariq 'awal		فريق; Fariq	لواء; Liwa	عميد; Amid		عقيد; Aqid		مقدم; Muqaddam		رائد; Ra'id	نقيب; Naqib	ملازم أول; Mulazim awwal		ملازم; Mulazim
Uzbek River Force
Uzbek River Force								I rang kapitani		II rang kapitani		III rang kapitani	Kapitan-leytenant	Katta leytenant		Leytenant
Vietnam People's Navy
Vietnam People's Navy				Đô đốc	Phó đô đốc	Chuẩn đô đốc		Đại tá	Thượng tá	Trung tá		Thiếu tá	Đại úy	Thượng úy	Trung úy	Thiếu úy
Vietnam Coast Guard
Vietnam Coast Guard					Trung tướng	Thiếu tướng		Đại tá	Thượng tá	Trung tá		Thiếu tá	Đại úy	Thượng úy	Trung úy	Thiếu úy
Yemeni Navy
Yemeni Navy						عميد; Amid		عقيد; Aqid		مقدم; Muqaddam		رائد; Ra'id	نقيب; Naqib	ملازم أول; Mulazim awwal		ملازم ثان; Mulazim than
Rank group	General / flag officers							Senior officers					Junior officers

== See also ==
- Comparative navy enlisted ranks of Asia
