= Abdullah al-Mansoori =

Bahraini naval officer

Abdullah Sayid al-Mansoori
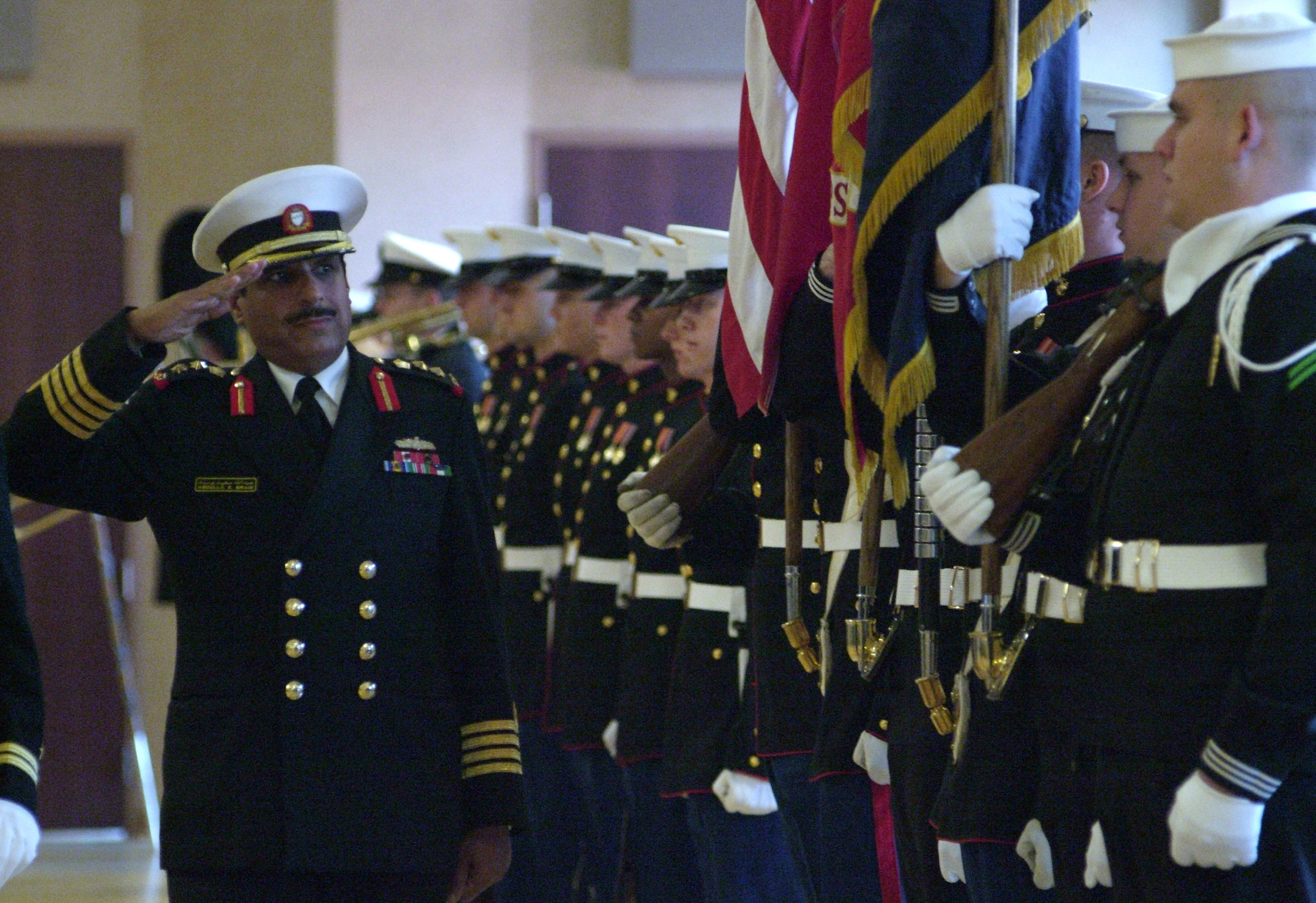
- Military career
- Allegiance: Bahrain
- Branch: Royal Bahraini Naval Force
- Service years: 1975–present
- Rank: Rear Admiral
- Commands: Combined Task Force 152; National Defence College

Abdullah Sayid al-Mansoori is a Bahraini naval officer. He held several senior command positions, including Commander Royal Bahrain Naval Force, Commander Combined Task Force 152, and Commander Flotilla. Al-Mansoori also has a PhD in international relations and was awarded the Legion of Merit. He is currently the head of the national defence college of Bahrain.
