= Hawk-class patrol boat =

Jordan boat class

Class overview
- Name: Hawk or Al-Hussein class
- Builders: Vosper Thornycroft, Portchester
- Operators: Jordan Royal Naval Force
- Built: 1989–1991
- In commission: 1991–present
- Completed: 3
- Active: 3

General characteristics
- Type: Fast patrol craft
- Displacement: 95 long tons (97 t) standard; 124 long tons (126 t) full load
- Length: 30.45 m (99 ft 11 in)
- Beam: 6.87 m (22 ft 6 in)
- Draft: 1.5 m (4 ft 11 in)
- Propulsion: 2 × MTU 16V 396 TB94 diesel engines, 5,765 hp (4,299 kW)
- Speed: 32.5 knots (60.2 km/h; 37.4 mph)
- Range: 1,500 nmi (2,800 km) at 11 kn (20 km/h); 750 nmi (1,390 km) at 15 kn (28 km/h)
- Complement: 16 (3 officers, 13 men)
- Armament: 1 × twin Oerlikon/BMARC GCM-A03 30 mm gun; 1 × single Oerlikon/BMARC GAM-B01 20 mm gun; 7.62 mm machine guns

The Hawk-class of fast patrol craft is in service with the Royal Naval Force of Jordan. The ships were built by British shipbuilder Vosper Thornycroft (now BAE Systems Surface Ships).
