= Combined Task Force 152 =

Multinational Persian Gulf force since 2004

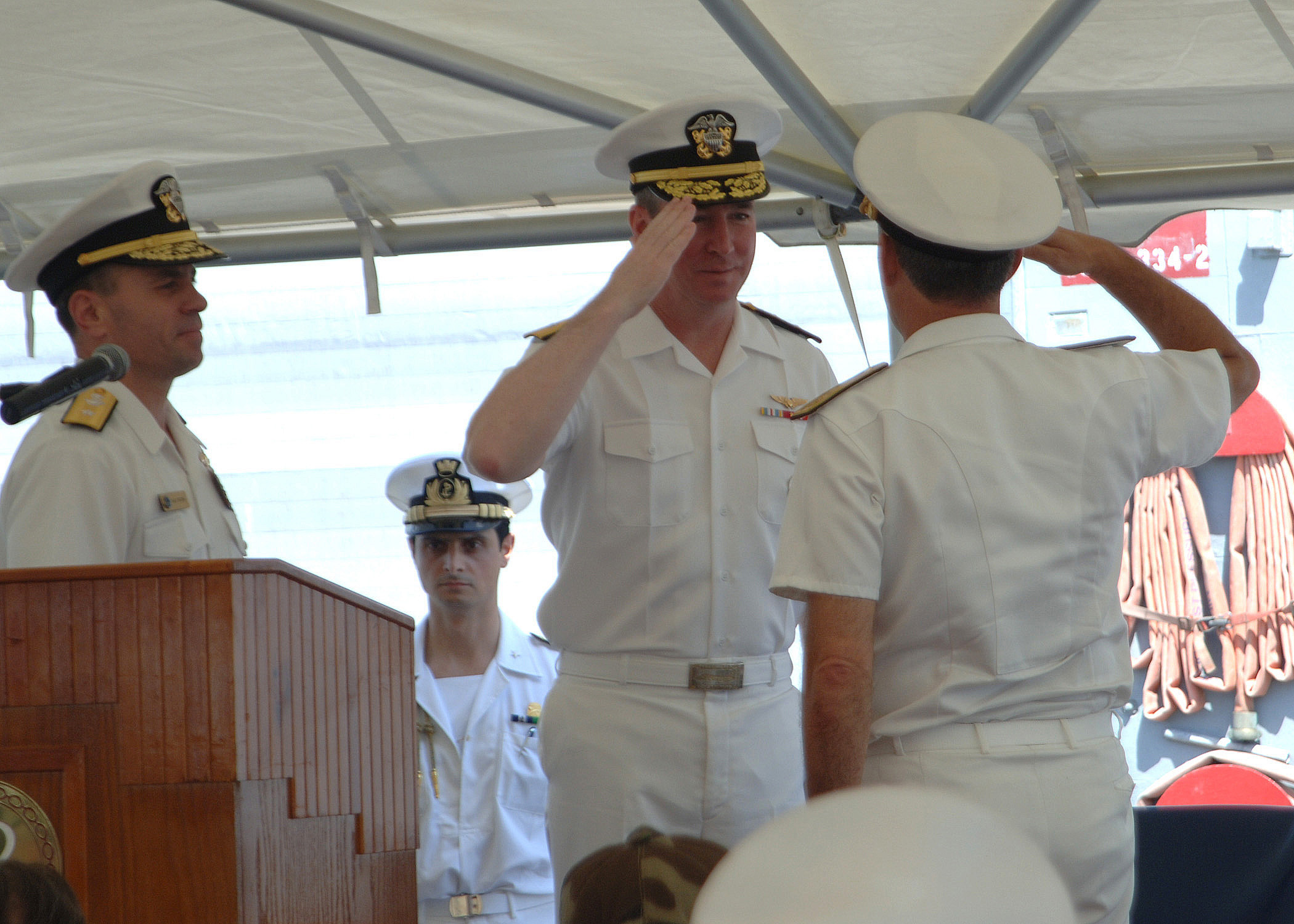
Combined Task Force 152 Transfer of Control Ceremony in June 2006

The Combined Task Force 152 or CTF-152 is a multinational naval task force, set up in 2004 to coordinate security operations in the Persian Gulf and is one of three task forces operated by Combined Maritime Forces (CMF). In July 2007 a crew from the destroyer USS O'Kane, attached to CTF-152, boarded a North Korean ship suspected of smuggling. CTF 152 cooperates with the naval and coast guard forces of different nations of the Persian Gulf region, and its command is rotated among member nations. Bahrain was the first Gulf Cooperation Council state to take command of the task force, in 2008.

== Known commanders ==
Commander Combined Task Force 152
From	Commander	Dates	Ref
United States Navy	Rear Admiral Ray Spicer	? – June 2006	
Italian Navy	Rear Admiral Salvatore Ruzittu	June 2006 – ?	
United States Navy	Rear Admiral William E. Gortney	? – March 2008	
Royal Bahraini Naval Force	Commodore Abdullah al-Mansoori	March 2008 – June 2008	
Royal Navy	Commodore Peter Hudson	June 2008 – September 2008	
United States Navy	Rear Admiral James P. Wisecup	September 2008 –	
Royal Navy	Commodore Tim Lowe	– November 2009	
United Arab Emirates Navy	Commodore Tareq Khalfan al-Zaabi	November 2009 – May 2010	
Kuwait Navy	Rear Admiral Jassim al-Ansari	May 2010 – August 2010	
Kuwait Navy	Commodore Abdullah Dashti	August 2010 – ?	
Kuwait Navy	Rear Admiral Jassim al Ansari	? – January 2011	
Royal Bahraini Naval Force	Commodore Isa al-Doseri	January 2011 –	
Kuwait Navy	Commodore Nayef al-Askar	February 2016 – September 2016	
Royal Jordanian Navy	Commodore Abdelkader Al-Marahleh	September 2016 – September 2017	
Royal Saudi Navy	Captain Abdullah al-Bader	September 2017 – September 2018	
Kuwait Coast Guard	Captain Saleh Alfodary	September 2018 – Feb 28, 2019	
Kuwait Coast Guard		Feb 28, 2019 – Aug 29, 2019	
Royal Jordanian Navy		Aug 29, 2019 – Feb 29, 2020	
Royal Jordanian Navy	Commander Omar Alodat	Feb 29, 2020 – Aug 31, 2020	
Royal Saudi Navy	Captain Ali bin Madi Al-Qahtani	Aug 31, 2020 – Sep 2, 2020	
Kuwait Navy	Colonel Ebraheem Al-Dawai	Sep 2, 2020 –	
