= Royal Jordanian Navy =

Maritime warfare branch of Jordan's military

Royal Jordanian Naval Force
- القوة البحرية الاردنية
- Naval Ensign of Jordan
- Founded: 1951
- Country: Jordan
- Role: Navy
- Garrison/HQ: Aqaba
- Equipment: 27 patrol craft

Commanders
- Commander-in-chief: King Abdullah II
- Chairman of the Joint Chiefs of Staff: Air Vice Marshal Yousef Huneiti
- Commander of the Navy: Brig. General Ibrahim Salman al-Naimat

The Royal Jordanian Navy (Arabic: القوة البحرية الأردنية) is the naval warfare branch of the Armed Forces of the Kingdom of Jordan. As Jordan is landlocked except at its southern extremity, with only 26 kilometres (16 mi) of shoreline along the Gulf of Aqaba providing access to the Red Sea, its Naval Force comprises 27 patrol boats, and has a total complement of more than 700 personnel, excluding the 77th Marines Reconnaissance Battalion. The Naval Force is under the command of the army.

As of July 2016 the Commander of the Navy is Brigadier General Ibrahim Salman Al-Naimat.

The Royal Jordanian Navy also cooperates with other nations in the region, being part of the maritime Combined Task Force 152 that provides security in the Persian Gulf.

== History ==
The Royal Naval Force was established in 1951, in Aqaba, as the Royal Coast Guard. Its size was about that of an infantry company, i.e. circa 200 men. In 1952, the Coast Guard Headquarters was moved to the Dead Sea area and remained there until 1967. In 1974, the Coast Guard was provided with four medium patrol boats (Bertram Class) along with equipment for the divers and frogmen.

Although the naval element of the armed forces was designated the Royal Jordanian Navy, it remained an integral part of the army. Performing essentially a coast guard mission, in 1988 it had 300 officers and men based at Aqaba, the country's only port, with access to the Red Sea. The navy operated five coastal patrol boats of United States manufacture armed with light machine guns. The navy assisted in the maintenance of harbor security, operating in conjunction with customs and immigration personnel to ensure the enforcement of the country's laws and regulations. In late 1987, three larger craft of ninety-five tons each were ordered from Britain. When introduced, each would have a crew of sixteen and would be armed with 20mm and 30mm guns. Israeli units at the adjacent Israeli naval facility at Eilat similarly consisted of small, lightly armed patrol boats.

In 1991, the Coast Guard was provided with three heavy patrol boats (Hawk Class). On 13 November 1991 the Royal Coast Guard was renamed as the Royal Naval Force.

In 2009, at the IDEX exhibition in Abu Dhabi, the King Abdullah II Design and Development Bureau (KADDB) and the U.S. firm RiverHawk Worldwide agreed to form Jordan RiverHawk Shipbuilding and Support to build AMP-137 multi-mission patrol vessels in Jordan. The navy later commissioned four AMP-137 boats built by KADDB.

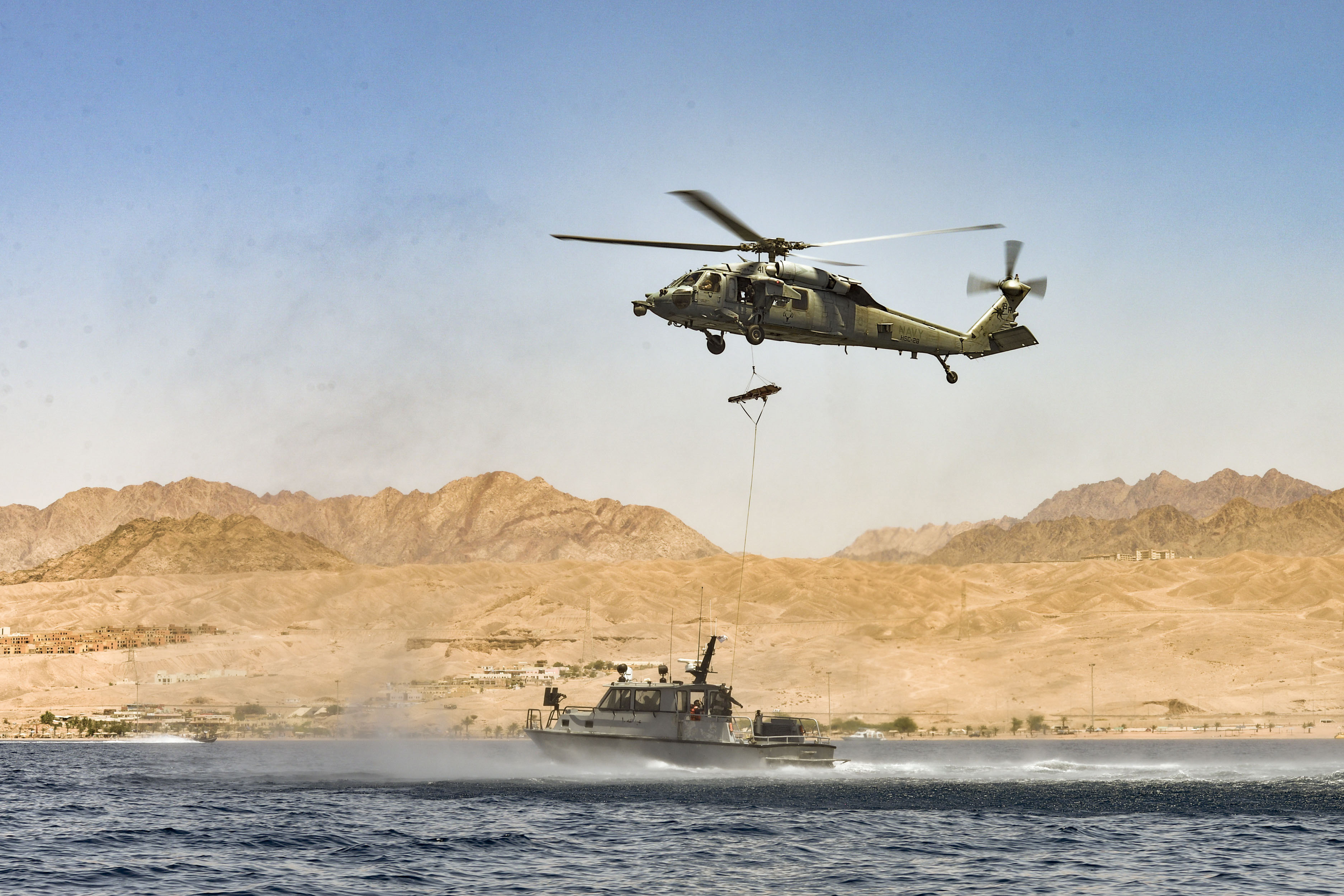
An MH-60S Sea Hawk helicopter assigned to Helicopter Sea Combat Squadron 28 practices casualty evacuation procedures with a patrol boat from the Royal Jordanian Navy Combat Boats Group during exercise Eager Lion in Aqaba, Jordan 24th April, 2018.

== Royal Naval Units ==
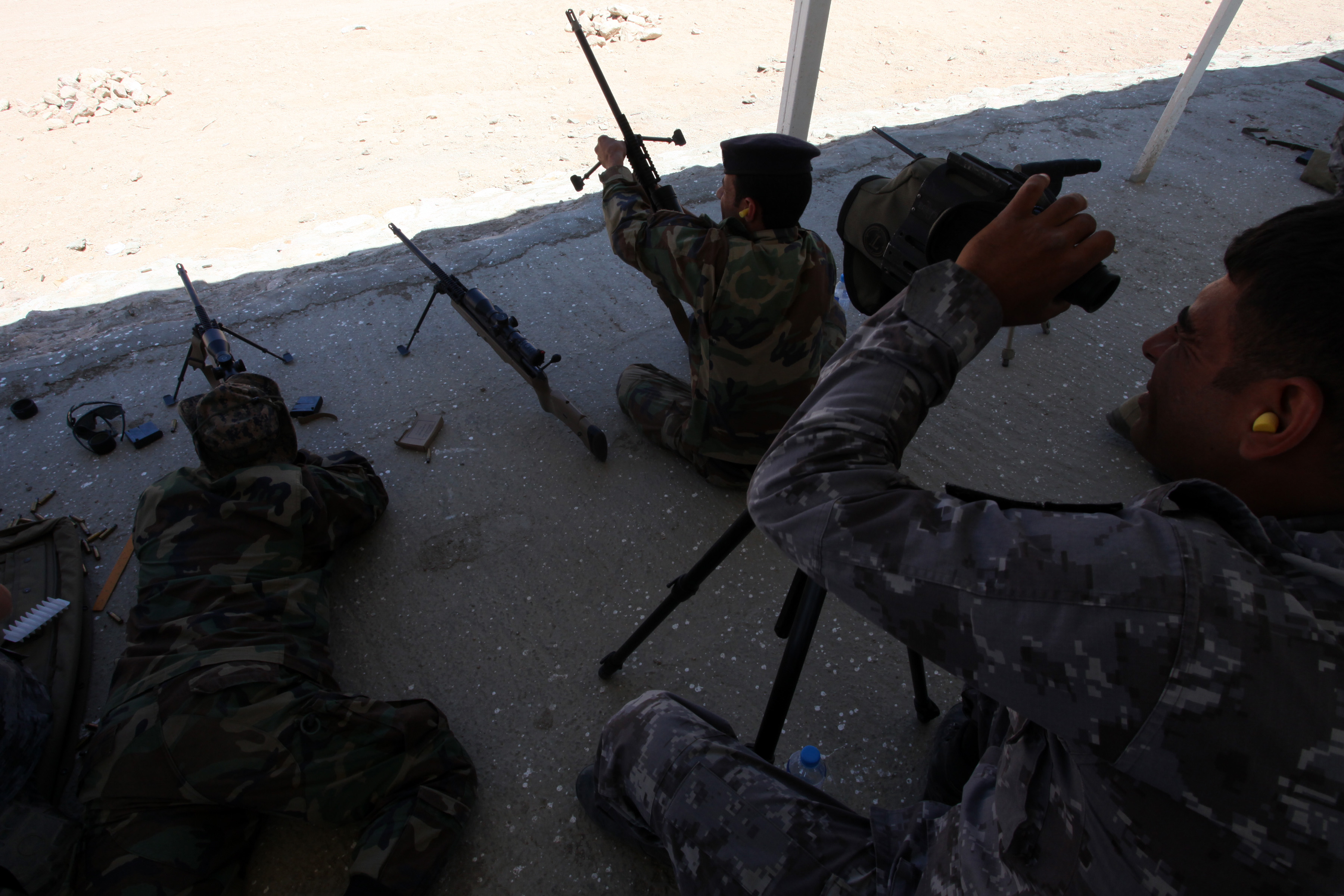
Members of the Jordanian 77th Marine Reconnaissance Battalion verify scope settings

- Naval Command HQ
  - Command Staff
  - Naval Signal Company
- Combat Vessels Group
- Naval Frogmen Group
- 77th Marine Battalion
- Naval Special Boat Unit
- Counter-terrorism Team from Special Unit-II
- Marine Surveillance Company / Aqaba
- Marine Surveillance Company / Dead Sea
- Technical Support Group
- Maritime Training Center

== Equipment ==
=== Patrol boats ===
Class	Units	Note
Al-Hussein class (VT Hawk)	3	2 × 30 mm guns, 1 × 20 mm gun, 2 × 12.7 mm machine guns.
Al-Hashim class (Type 412)	2	1 × 12.7 mm MGs.
Abdullah class	8	2 × 12.5 mm MGs.
Faysal class (Bertram)	4	1 × 12.7 mm MGs.
Faysal class (Commander)	4	2 × 12.5 mm MGs.
AMP-137 PB	4	Built by KADDB.
Falcon class	2	1 × Rafael remote controlled & 1 × 7.62 mm MGs.

=== Special maritime forces boats ===
Class	Units	Note
RHIB boats for special forces	8
17 foot launch boat	4
19 foot GRP	4
Light craft SRB for special forces	2

== Naval infrastructure ==
- Naval base: Aqaba
