= Comparative navy officer ranks of Africa =

Rank comparison chart of officers for navies of African states.

== Officers ==
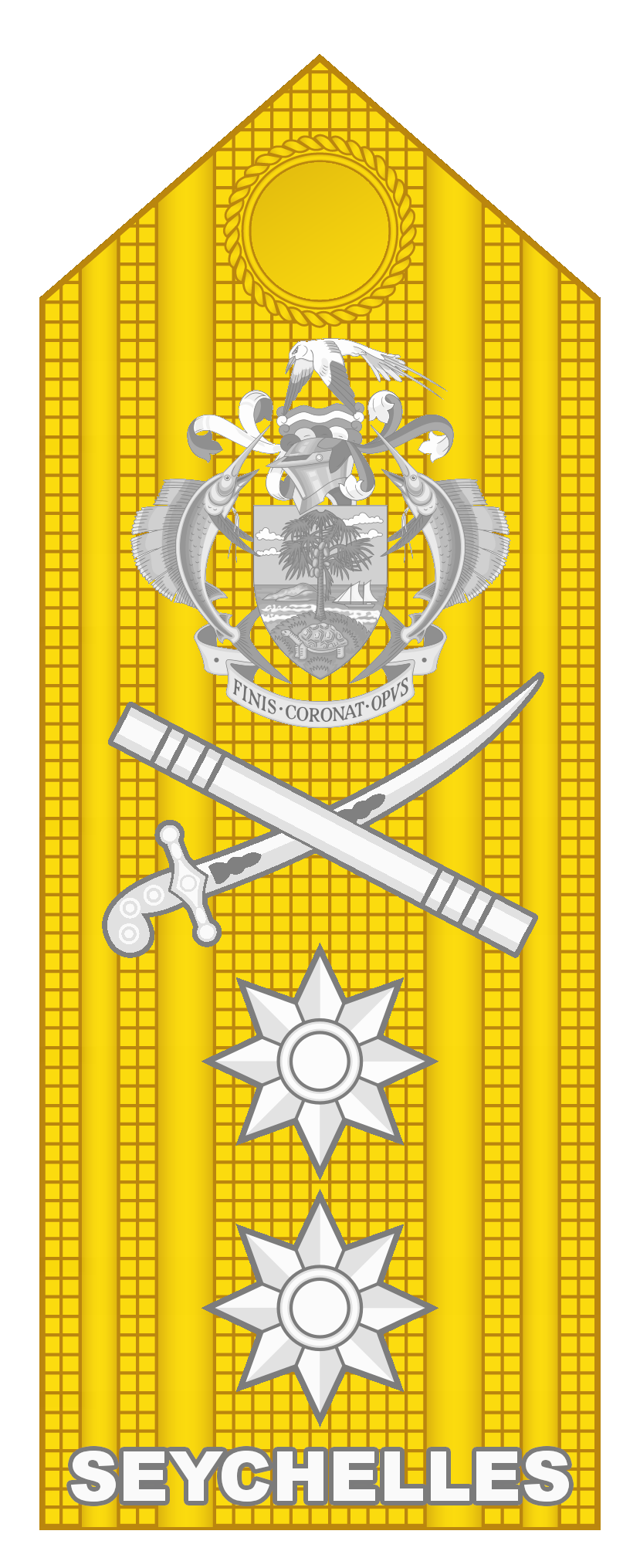
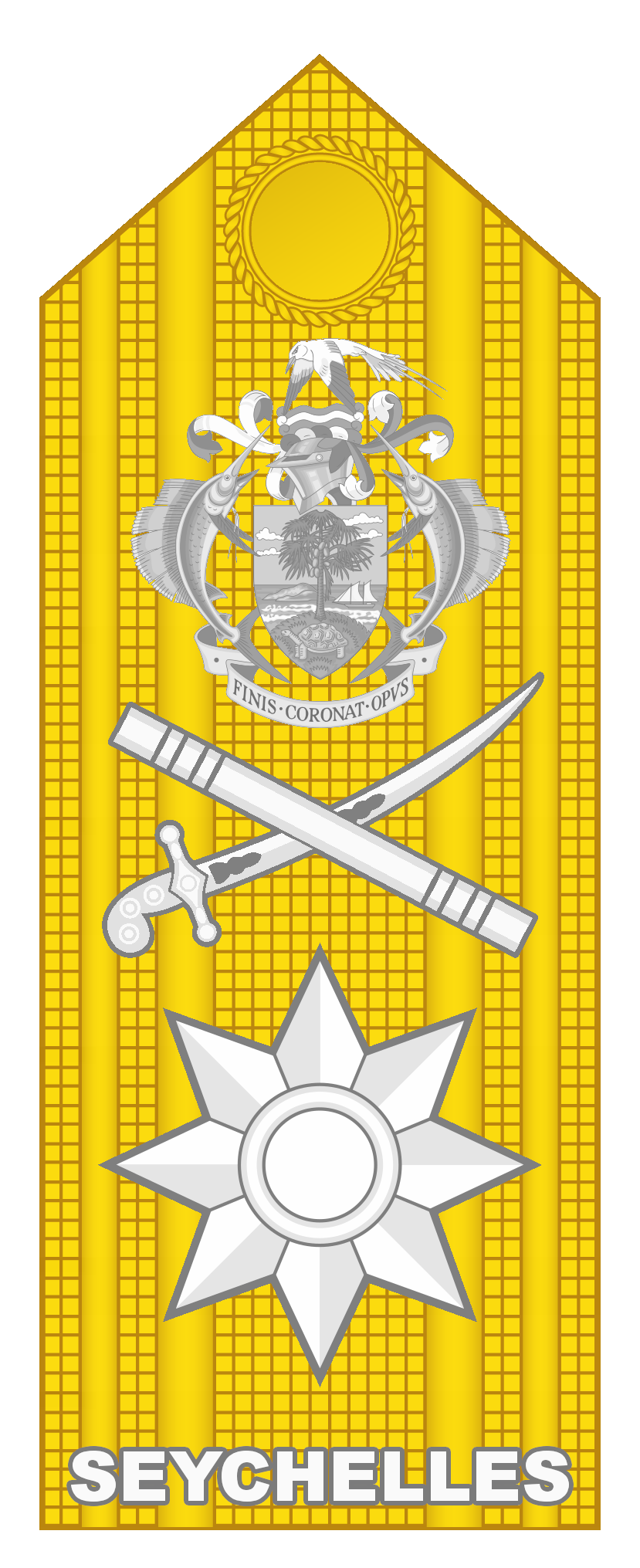
Rank group	General/flag officers					Senior officers				Junior officers
Algerian National Navy
Algerian National Navy		فريق أول; Fariq 'awal	فريق; Fariq	لواء; Liwa	عميد; Amid	عقيد; Aqid		مقدم; Muqaddam	رائد; Ra'id	نقيب; Naqib	ملازم أول; Mulazim awwal		ملازم; Mulazim
Algerian National Navy		Général d'armée	Général de corps d'armée	Général de division	Général	Colonel		Lieutenant-colonel	Commandant	Capitaine	Lieutenant		Sous-lieutenant
Angolan Navy
Angolan Navy		Almirante-da-Armada	Almirante	Vice-almirante	Contra-almirante	Capitão-de-mar-e-guerra		Capitão-de-fragata	Capitão-de-corveta	Tenente-de-navio	Tenente-de-fragata		Tenente-de-corveta
Benin Navy
Benin Navy		Amiral	Vice-amiral d'escadre	Vice-amiral	Contre-amiral	Capitaine de vaisseau		Capitaine de frégate	Capitaine de corvette	Lieutenant de vaisseau	Enseigne de vaisseau de 1^{ère} classe		Enseigne de vaisseau de 2^{ème} classe
Botswana	No navy
Burkina Faso	No navy
Burundi	No navy
Cameroon Navy
Cameroon Navy		Amiral d'escadre	Vice-amiral d'escadre	Vice-amiral	Contre-amiral	Capitaine de vaisseau		Capitaine de frégate	Capitaine de corvette	Lieutenant de vaisseau	Enseigne de vaisseau de 1^{re} classe		Enseigne de vaisseau de 2^{e} classe
Cape Verdean Coast Guard
Cape Verdean Coast Guard				Contra-almirante	Comodoro	Capitão–de–mar		Capitão–de–navio	Capitão-de–patrulha	Capitão-tenente	Primeiro-tenente	Tenente	Guarda-marinha
Central African Republic	No navy
Chad	No navy
Comoros	No navy
Navy of the DR Congo
Navy of the DR Congo		Grand amiral	Amiral	Vice-amiral	Contre-amiral	Capitaine de vaisseau		Capitaine de frégate	Capitaine de corvette	Lieutenant de vaisseau	Enseigne de vaisseau		Enseigne de vaisseau de 2^{e} classe
Rank group	General/flag officers					Senior officers				Junior officers
Congolese Navy
Congolese Navy		Amiral	Vice-amiral d'escadre	Vice-amiral	Contre-amiral	Capitaine de vaisseau		Capitaine de frégate	Capitaine de corvette	Lieutenant de vaisseau	Enseigne de vaisseau de 1^{re} classe		Enseigne de vaisseau de 2^{e} classe
Djiboutian Navy
Djiboutian Navy					Général de brigade	Colonel-major	Colonel	Lieutenant-colonel	Commandant	Capitaine	Lieutenant		Sous-lieutenant
Egyptian Navy
Egyptian Navy		فريق أول; Fariq 'awal	فريق; Fariq	لواء; Liwa	عميد; Amid	عقيد; Aqid		مقدم; Muqaddam	رائد; Ra'id	نقيب; Naqib	ملازم أول; Mulazim awwal		ملازم; Mulazim
Navy of Equatorial Guinea
Navy of Equatorial Guinea				Vice almirante	Contra almirante	Capitán de navío		Capitán de fragata	Capitán de corbeta	Teniente de navío	Alférez de navío		Alférez de fragata
Eritrean Navy
Eritrean Navy				Major general	Brigadier general	Colonel		Lieutenant colonel	Major	Captain	First lieutenant		Second lieutenant
Ethiopian Navy
Ethiopian Navy		አድሚራል; Ādimīrali	ቫይስ አድሚራል; Vayisi ādimīrali	ሬር አድሚራል; Rēri ādimīrali	ኮሞዶር; Komodori	ካፒቴን; Kapītēni		ኮማንደር; Komanideri	ሌፍተናንት ኮማንደር; Lēfitenaniti komanideri	ሌፍተናንት; Lēfitenaniti	ሌፍተናንት ጁኒየር ግሬድ; Lēfitenaniti junīyeri girēdi		ሰብ ሌፍተናንት; Sebi lēfitenaniti
Gabonese Navy
Gabonese Navy		Amiral	Vice-amiral d'escadre	Vice-amiral	Contre-amiral	Capitaine de vaisseau		Capitaine de frégate	Capitaine de corvette	Lieutenant de vaisseau	Enseigne de vaisseau de 1^{re} classe		Enseigne de vaisseau de 2^{e} classe
Gambian Navy
Gambian Navy			Vice admiral	Rear admiral	Commodore	Captain		Commander	Lieutenant commander	Lieutenant	Lieutenant (junior grade)		Sub-lieutenant
Ghana Navy
Ghana Navy		Admiral	Vice admiral	Rear admiral	Commodore	Captain		Commander	Lieutenant commander	Lieutenant	Sub lieutenant
Guinean Navy
Guinean Navy		Amiral de la Flotte	Vice-amiral d'escadre	Vice-amiral	Contre-amiral	Capitaine de vaisseau		Capitaine de frégate	Capitaine de corvette	Lieutenant de vaisseau	Enseigne de vaisseau de 1^{re} classe		Enseigne de vaisseau de 2^{e} classe
Navy of Guinea-Bissau
Navy of Guinea-Bissau		Almirante	Vice-almirante	Contra-almirante	Comodoro	Capitão de mar e guerra		Capitão de fragata	Capitão-tenente	Primeiro-tenente	Segundo-tenente		Guarda-marinha/ Subtenente
Navy of Ivory Coast
Navy of Ivory Coast		Amiral	Vice-amiral d'escadre	Vice-amiral	Contre-amiral	Capitaine de vaisseau major	Capitaine de vaisseau	Capitaine de frégate	Capitaine de corvette	Lieutenant de vaisseau	Enseigne de vaisseau de 1^{re} classe		Enseigne de vaisseau de 2^{e} classe
Kenya Navy
Kenya Navy		General	Lieutenant general	Major general	Brigadier	Colonel		Lieutenant colonel	Major	Captain	Lieutenant		Second lieutenant
Lesotho	No navy
Rank group	General/flag officers					Senior officers				Junior officers
Liberian National Coast Guard
Liberian National Coast Guard						Captain		Commander	Lieutenant commander	Lieutenant	Lieutenant (junior grade)		Ensign
Libyan Navy
Libyan Navy	مشير; Mushir	فريق أول; Fariq 'awal	فريق; Fariq	لواء; Liwa	عميد; Amid	عقيد; Aqid		مقدم; Muqaddam	رائد; Ra'id	نقيب; Naqib	ملازم أول; Mulazim awwal		ملازم; Mulazim
Madagascar Navy
Madagascar Navy		Amiral	Vice-amiral d'escadre	Vice-amiral	Contre-amiral	Capitaine de vaisseau		Capitaine de frégate	Capitaine de corvette	Lieutenant de vaisseau	Enseigne de vaisseau de 1^{re} classe		Enseigne de vaisseau de 2^{e} classe
Malawi Navy
Malawi Navy		General	Lieutenant general	Major general	Brigadier general	Colonel		Lieutenant colonel	Major	Captain	First lieutenant		Second lieutenant
Mali	No navy
Mauritanian Navy
Mauritanian Navy			فريق; Fariq	لواء; Liwa		عميد بحري; Amid baḥriun		مقدم بحري; Muqaddam baḥriun	رائد بحري; Ra'id baḥriun	نقيب بحري; Naqib baḥriun	ملازم أول بحري; Mulazim awwal baḥriun		ملازم بحري; Mulazim baḥriun
Mauritius	No navy
Royal Moroccan Navy
Royal Moroccan Navy		Amiral	Vice-amiral d'escadre	Vice-amiral	Contre-amiral	Capitaine de vaisseau-major	Capitaine de vaisseau	Capitaine de frégate	Capitaine de corvette	Lieutenant de vaisseau	Enseigne de vaisseau de 1^{re} classe		Enseigne de vaisseau de 2^{e} classe
Mozambique Naval Command
Mozambique Naval Command		Almirante	Vice-almirante	Contra-almirante		Capitão de mar e guerra		Capitão de fragata	Capitão-tenente	Primeiro-tenente	Segundo-tenente		Guarda-marinha
Namibian Navy
Namibian Navy		Admiral	Vice admiral	Rear admiral	Rear admiral junior grade	Captain		Commander	Lieutenant commander	Lieutenant	Lieutenant junior grade		Ensign
Niger	No navy
Nigerian Navy
Nigerian Navy	Admiral of the Fleet	Admiral	Vice admiral	Rear admiral	Commodore	Captain		Commander	Lieutenant commander	Lieutenant	Sub-Lieutenant		Midshipman
Rwanda	No navy
Rank group	General/flag officers					Senior officers				Junior officers
Coast Guard of São Tomé and Príncipe
Coast Guard of São Tomé and Príncipe						Capitão de mar e guerra		Capitão de fragata	Capitão-tenente	Primeiro-tenente	Segundo-tenente		Guarda-marinha/ Subtenente
Senegalese Navy
Senegalese Navy					Contre-amiral	Capitaine de vaisseau		Capitaine de frégate	Capitaine de corvette	Lieutenant de vaisseau	Enseigne de vaisseau de 1^{re} classe		Enseigne de vaisseau de 2^{e} classe
Seychelles Coast Guard
Seychelles Coast Guard				Major general (Note: Introduced December 2024)	Brigadier general	Colonel		Lieutenant colonel	Major	Captain	Lieutenant		Second lieutenant
Sierra Leone Navy
Sierra Leone Navy				Rear admiral	Commodore	Captain		Commander	Lieutenant commander	Lieutenant	Lieutenant (junior grade)		Sub-Lieutenant
Somali Navy
Somali Navy			Admiraal guud	Admiraal gaas	Admiraal guuto	Gashaanle sare		Gashaanle dhexe	Gashaanle	Dhamme	Laba xídígle		Xídígle
Somaliland Coast Guard
Somaliland Coast Guard			Admiraal kuxigeenka	Admiraal gaas	Admiraal guuto	Gashaanle sare		Gashaanle dhexe	Gashaanle	Dhamme	Laba xídígle		Xídígle
South African Navy
South African Navy		Admiral	Vice admiral	Rear admiral	Rear admiral (junior grade)	Captain		Commander	Lieutenant commander	Lieutenant	Sub lieutenant		Ensign
South Sudan	No navy
Sudanese Navy
Sudanese Navy	مشیر; Mushir	فريق أول; Fariq 'awal	فريق; Fariq	لواء; Liwa	عميد; Amid	عقيد; Aqid		مقدم; Muqaddam	رائد; Ra'id	نقيب; Naqib	ملازم أول; Mulazim awwal		ملازم; Mulazim
(Eswatini) Swaziland	No navy
Tanzania Naval Command
Tanzania Naval Command			Vice admiral	Rear admiral	Commodore	Captain		Commander	Lieutenant commander	Lieutenant	Sub lieutenant		Ensign
Togolese Navy
Togolese Navy				Vice-amiral	Contre-amiral	Capitaine de vaisseau		Capitaine de frégate	Capitaine de corvette	Lieutenant de vaisseau	Enseigne de vaisseau de 1^{re} classe		Enseigne de vaisseau de 2^{e} classe
Tunisian National Navy
Tunisian National Navy			فريق أول بالبحرية; Fariq 'awal bialbaḥria	فريق بالبحرية; Fariq bialbaḥria	أمير لواء بالبحرية 'amir liwa' bialbaḥria	عميد بالبحرية; Amid bialbaḥria	عقيد بالبحرية; Aqid bialbaḥria	مقدم بالبحرية; Muqaddam bialbaḥria	رائد بالبحرية; Ra'id bialbaḥria	نقيب بالبحرية; Naqib bialbaḥria	ملازم أول بالبحرية; Mulazim 'awal bialbaḥria		ملازم بالبحرية; Mulazim bialbaḥria
Tunisian National Navy			Amiral	Vice-amiral	Contre-amiral	Capitaine de vaisseau major	Capitaine de vaisseau	Capitaine de frégate	Capitaine de corvette	Lieutenant de vaisseau	Enseigne de vaisseau de 1^{re} classe		Enseigne de vaisseau de 2^{e} classe
Uganda	No navy
Zambia	No navy
Zimbabwe	No navy
Rank group	General/flag officers					Senior officers				Junior officers

== See also ==
- Comparative navy officer ranks of the Americas
- Ranks and insignia of NATO navies officers
