= Military ranks of Libya =

The Military ranks of Libya are the military insignia used by the Libyan Armed Forces. The rank insignia was inspired by the armed forces of the United Kingdom, which trained the forces of the Kingdom of Libya during its Allied occupation up until independence. In 2016, the rank of Field marshal (Arabic: مشير, romanized: Mushir) was instituted and awarded to Khalifa Haftar.

== Commissioned officer ranks ==
The rank insignia of commissioned officers.

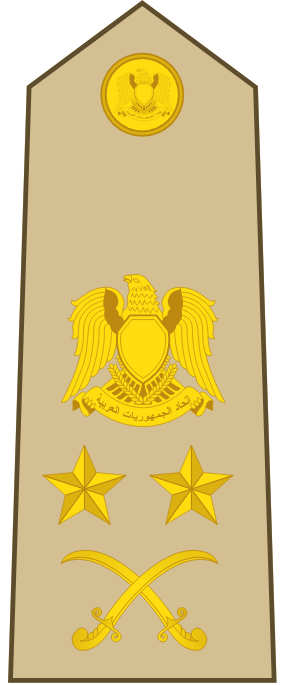
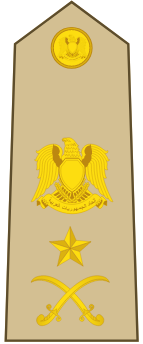
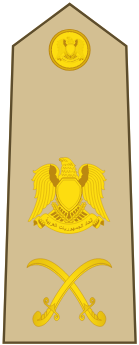
Rank group	General / flag officers					Senior officers			Junior officers
Libyan Ground Forces
Libyan Ground Forces	مشير; Mushir	فريق أول; Fariq 'awal	فريق; Fariq	لواء; Liwa	عميد; Amid	عقيد; Aqid	مقدم; Muqaddam	رائد; Ra'id	نقيب; Naqib	ملازم أول; Mulazim awwal	ملازم; Mulazim
Libyan Navy
Libyan Navy	مشير; Mushir	فريق أول; Fariq 'awal	فريق; Fariq	لواء; Liwa	عميد; Amid	عقيد; Aqid	مقدم; Muqaddam	رائد; Ra'id	نقيب; Naqib	ملازم أول; Mulazim awwal	ملازم; Mulazim
Libyan Air Force
Libyan Air Force	مشير; Mushir	فريق أول; Fariq 'awal	فريق; Fariq	لواء; Liwa	عميد; Amid	عقيد; Aqid	مقدم; Muqaddam	رائد; Ra'id	نقيب; Naqib	ملازم أول; Mulazim awwal	ملازم; Mulazim
Rank group	General / flag officers					Senior officers			Junior officers

== Other ranks ==
The rank insignia of non-commissioned officers and enlisted personnel.

Rank group	Senior NCOs			Junior NCOs	Enlisted
Libyan Ground Forces						No insignia
Libyan Ground Forces	Master Sergeant	Staff Sergeant	Sergeant	Corporal	Private 1st Class	Private
Libyan Navy						No insignia
Libyan Navy	Master sergeant	Staff sergeant	Sergeant	Corporal	Private 1st class	Private
Libyan Air Force						No insignia
Libyan Air Force	Master sergeant	Staff Sergeant	Sergeant	Corporal	Airman	Airman basic
Rank group	Senior NCOs			Junior NCOs	Enlisted
