= Military ranks of Iraq =

The Military ranks of Iraq are the military insignia used by the Iraqi Armed Forces. While the rank structure generally follows the rank structure of the Ottoman Empire, the insignia is inspired by the British insignia.

== Commissioned officer ranks ==
The rank insignia of commissioned officers.

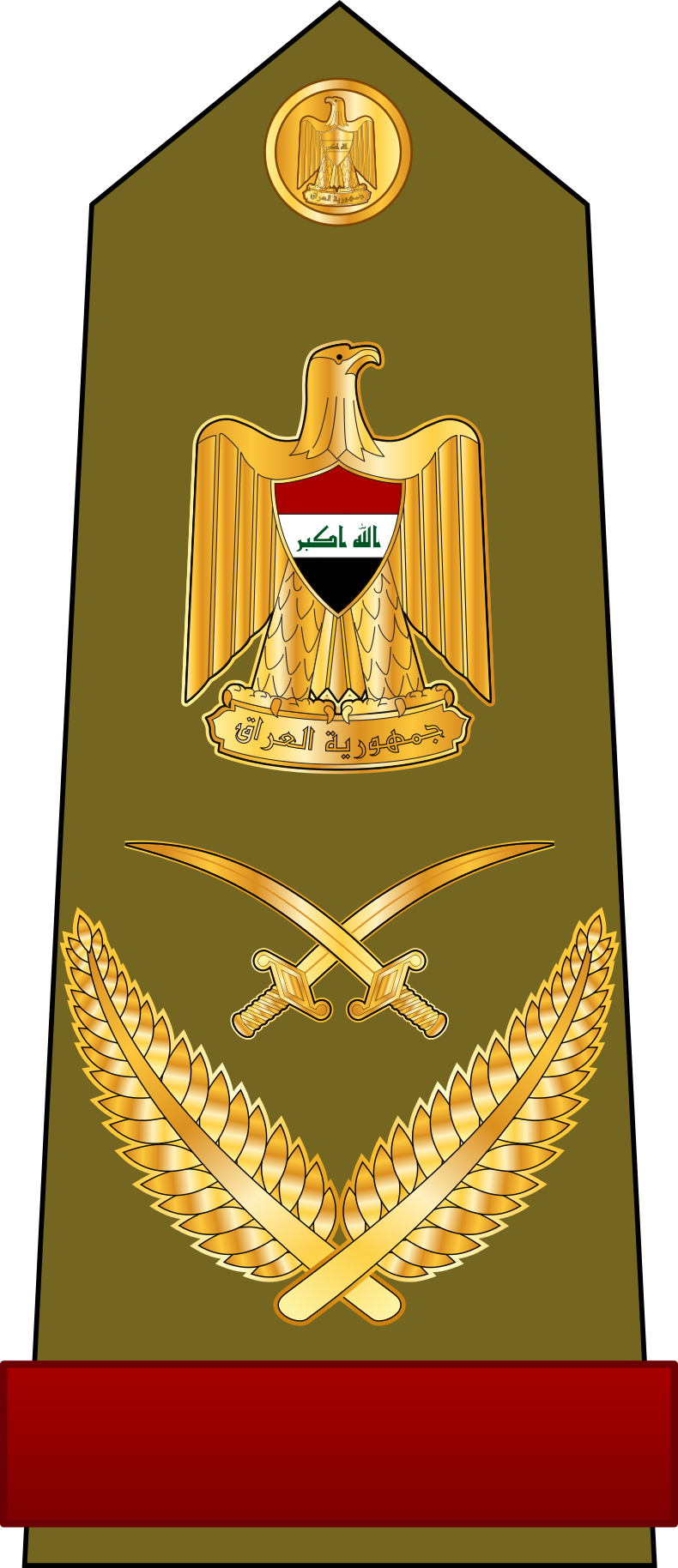
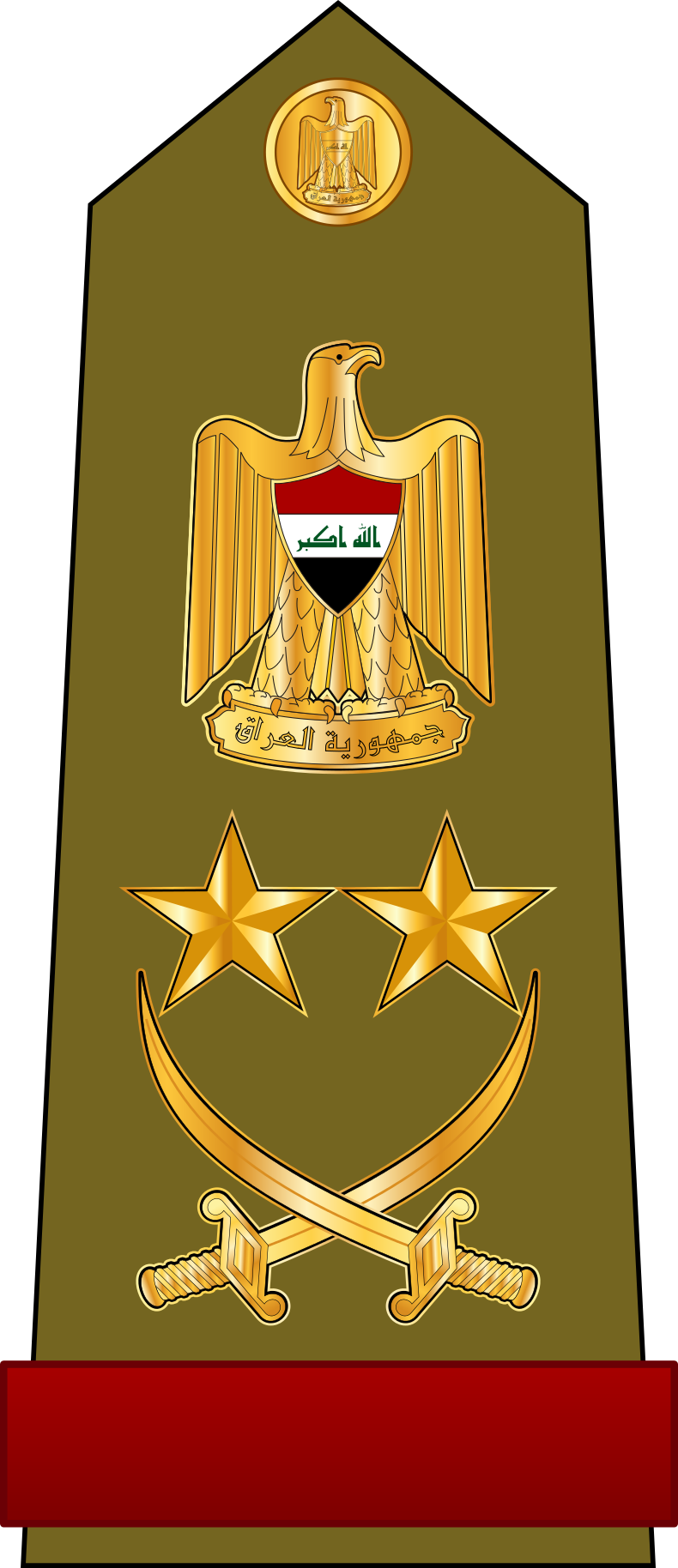
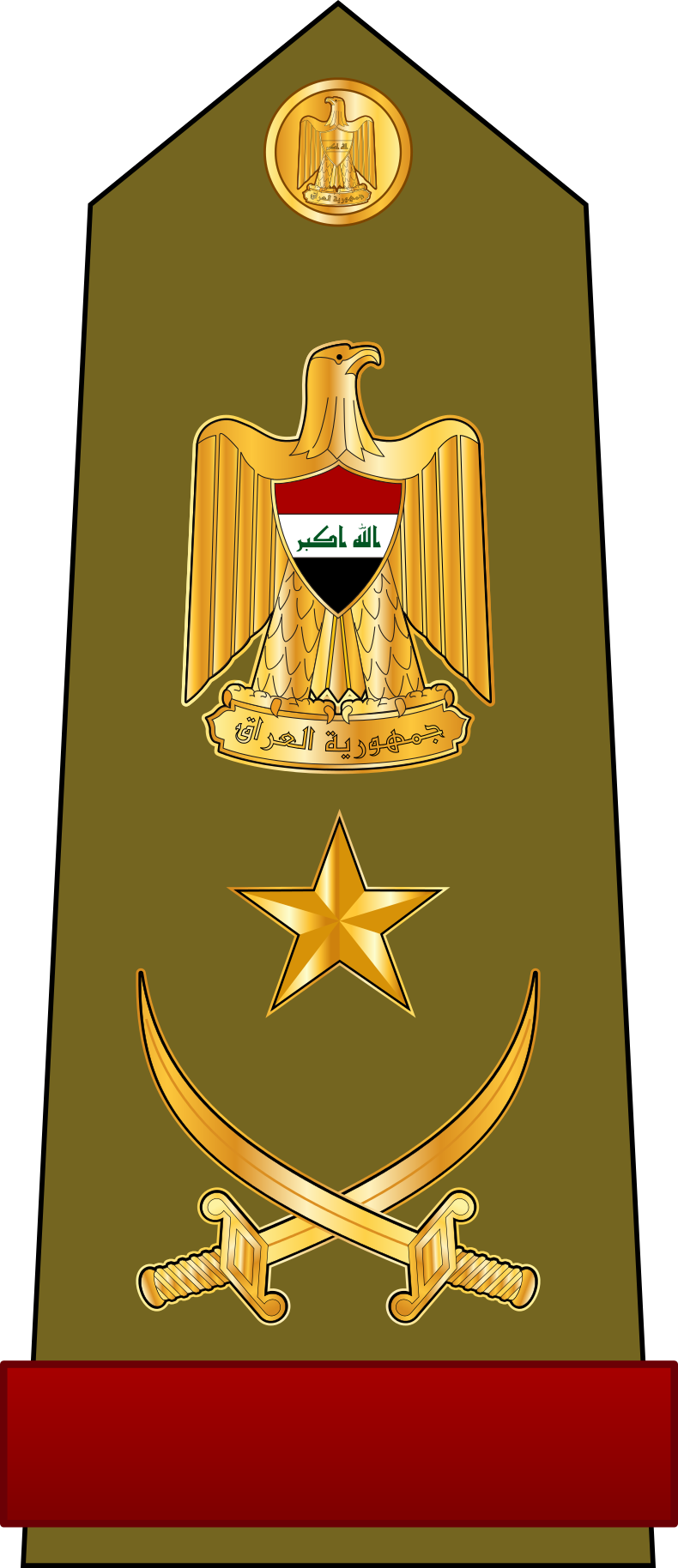
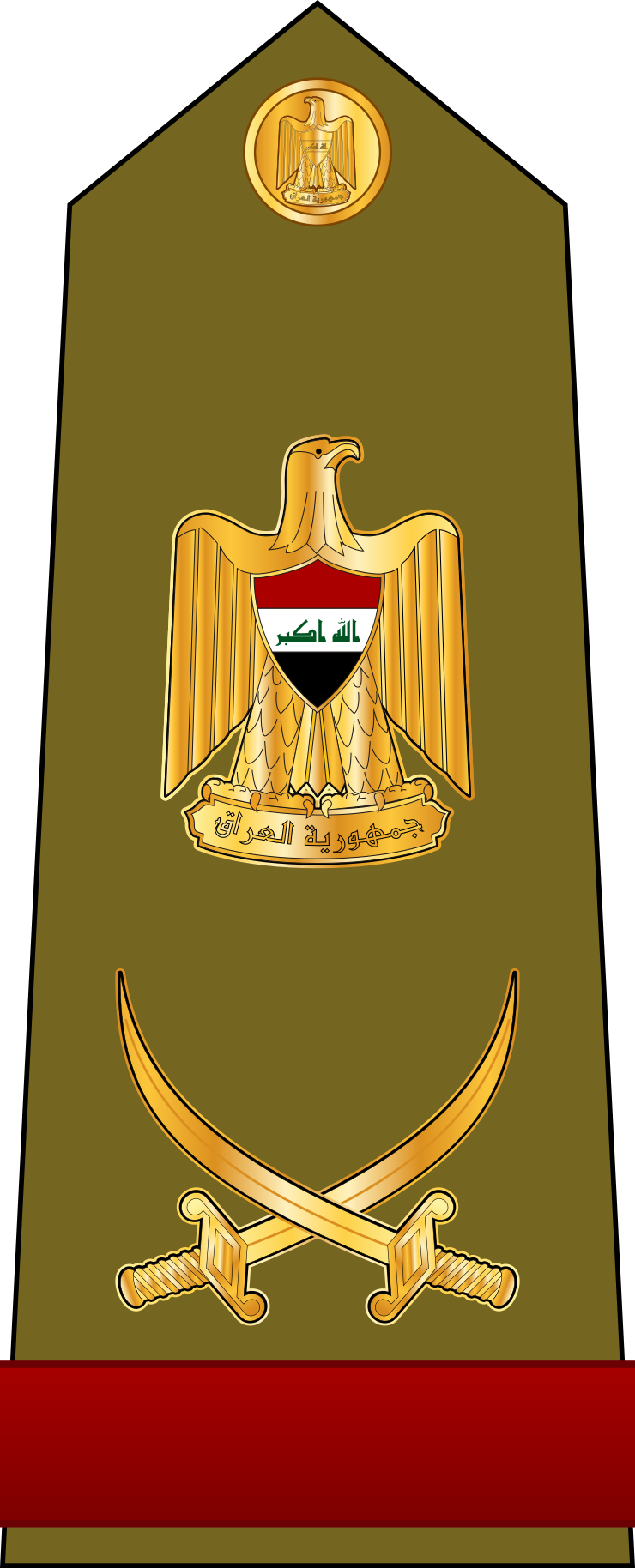
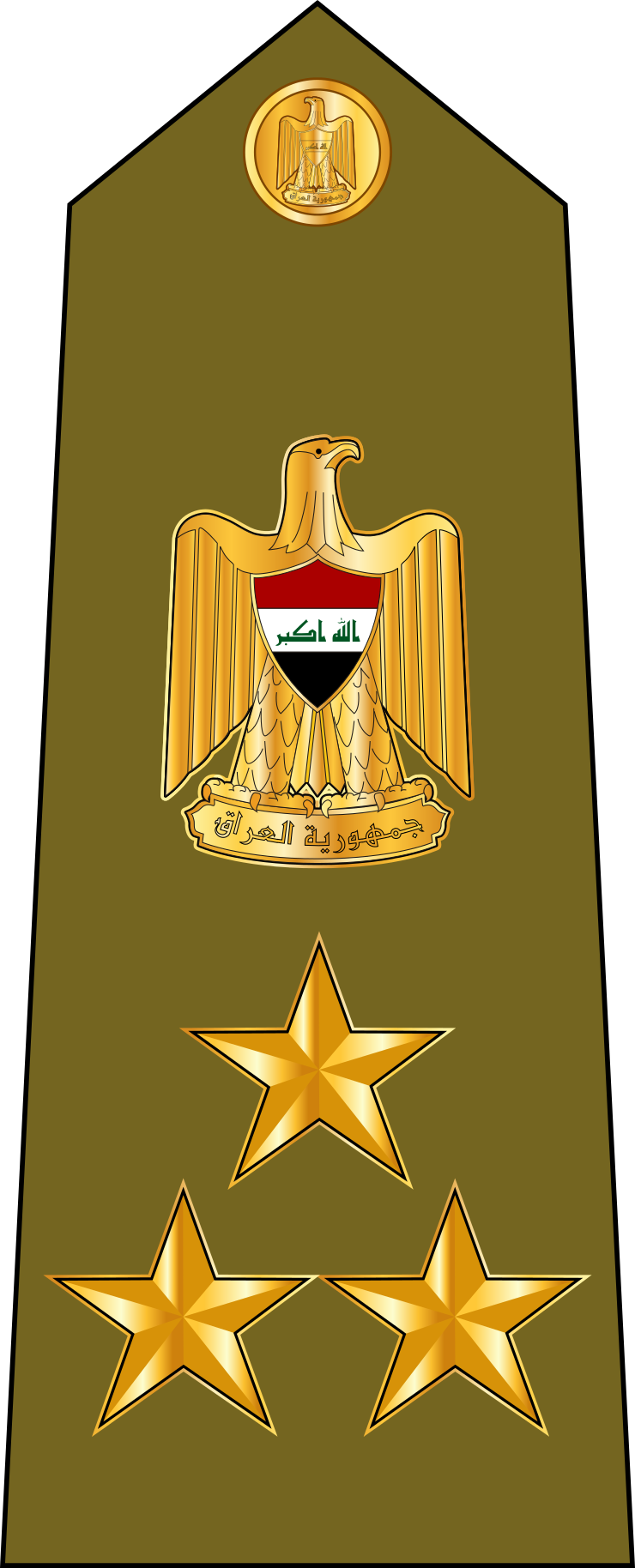
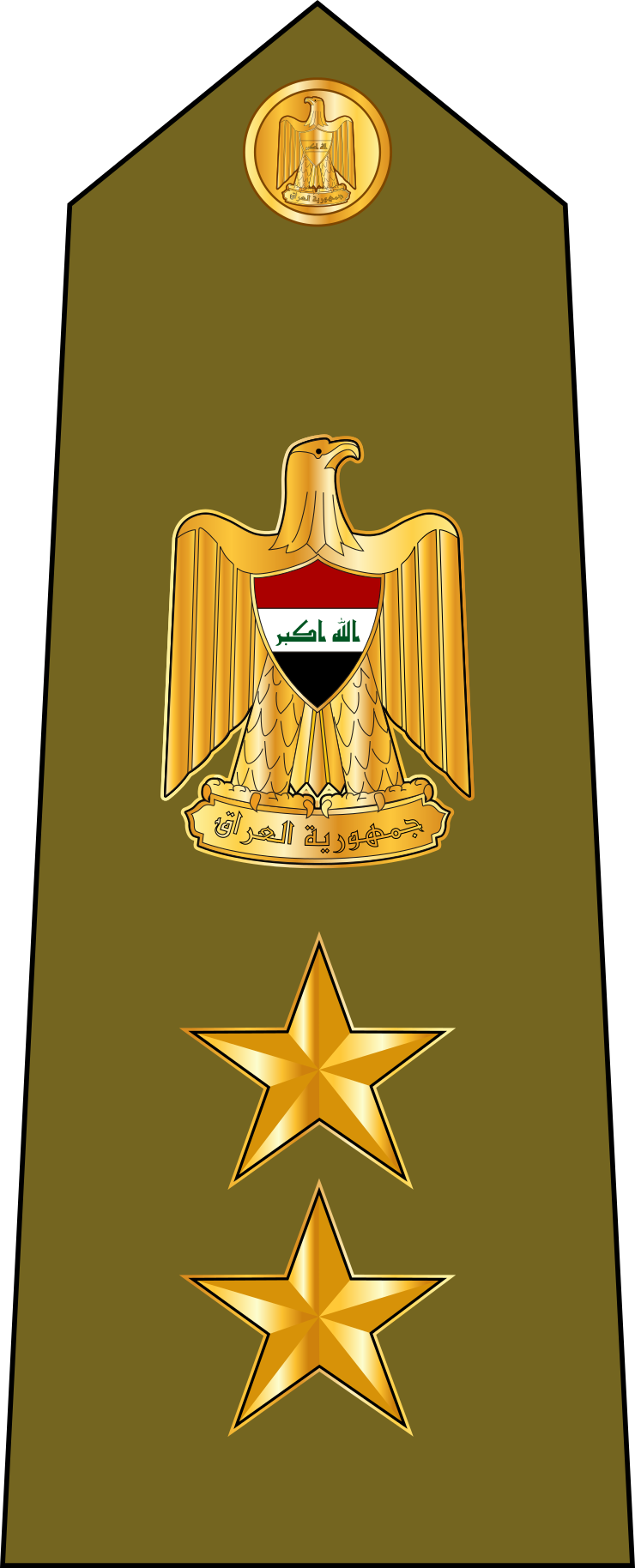
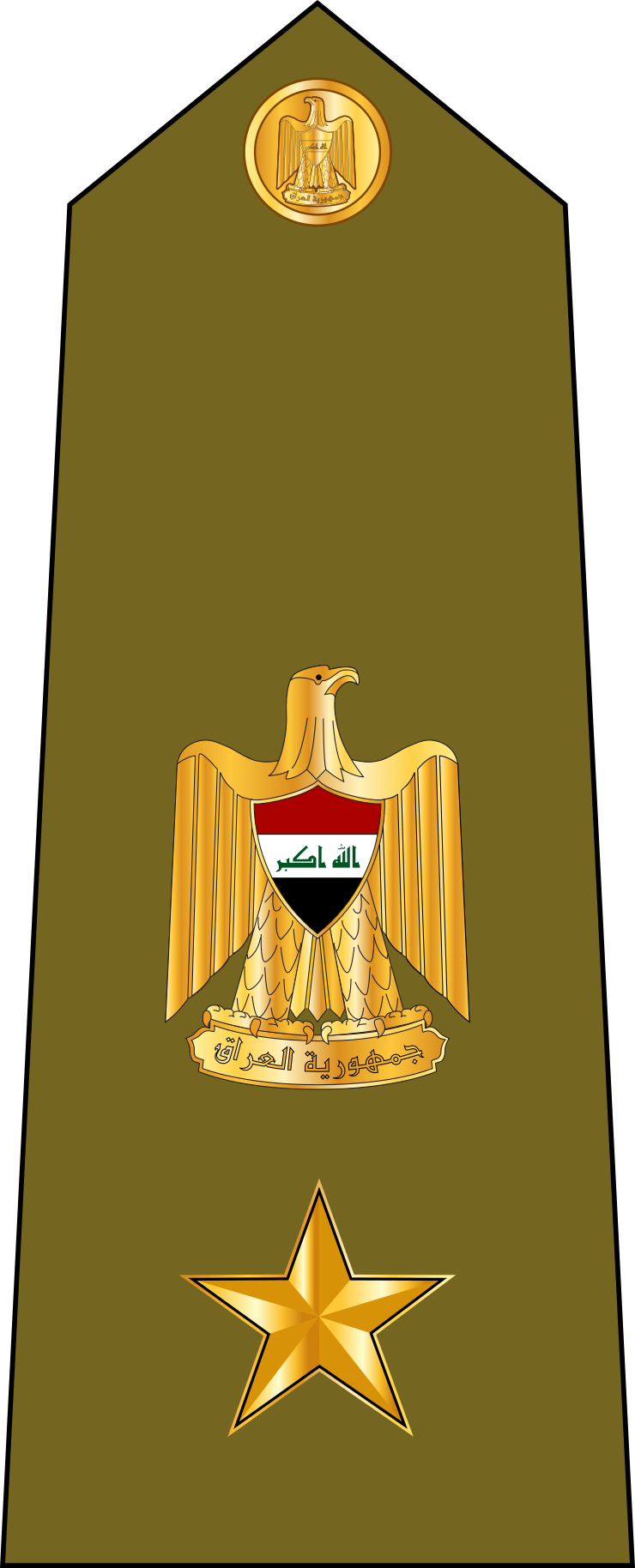
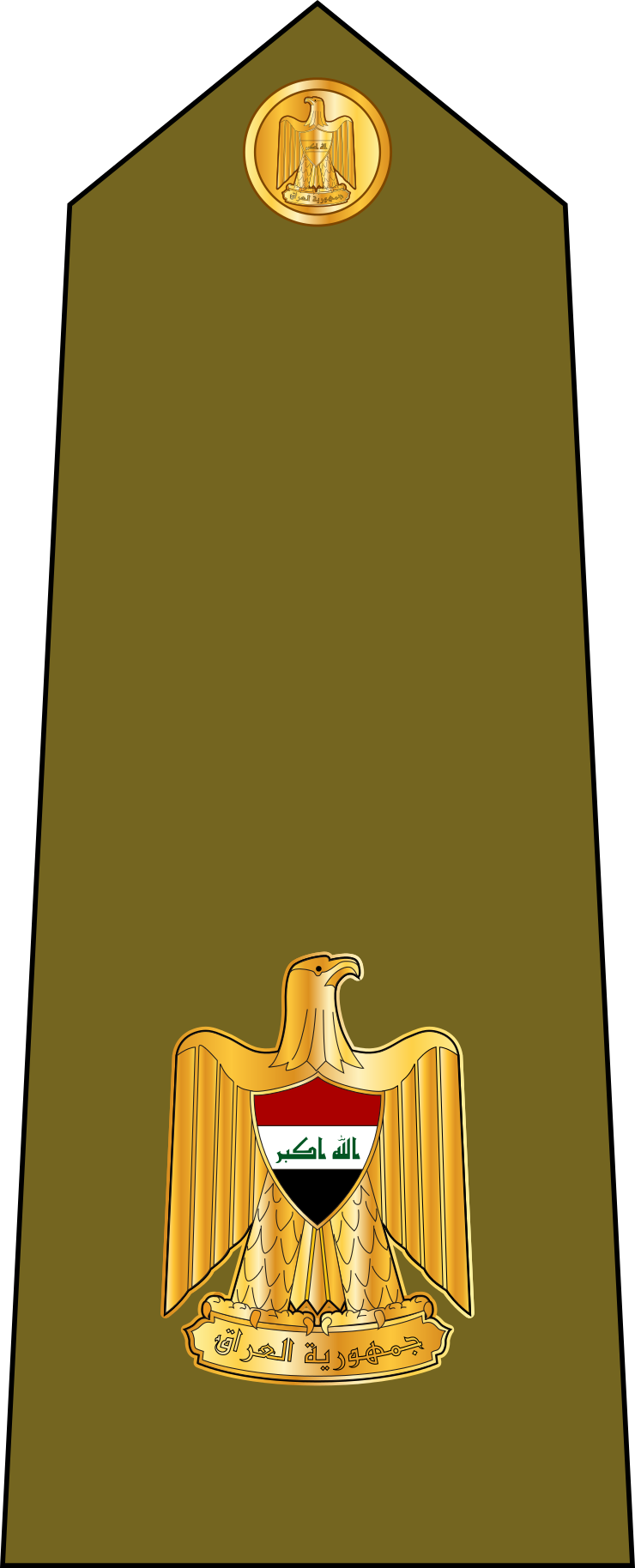
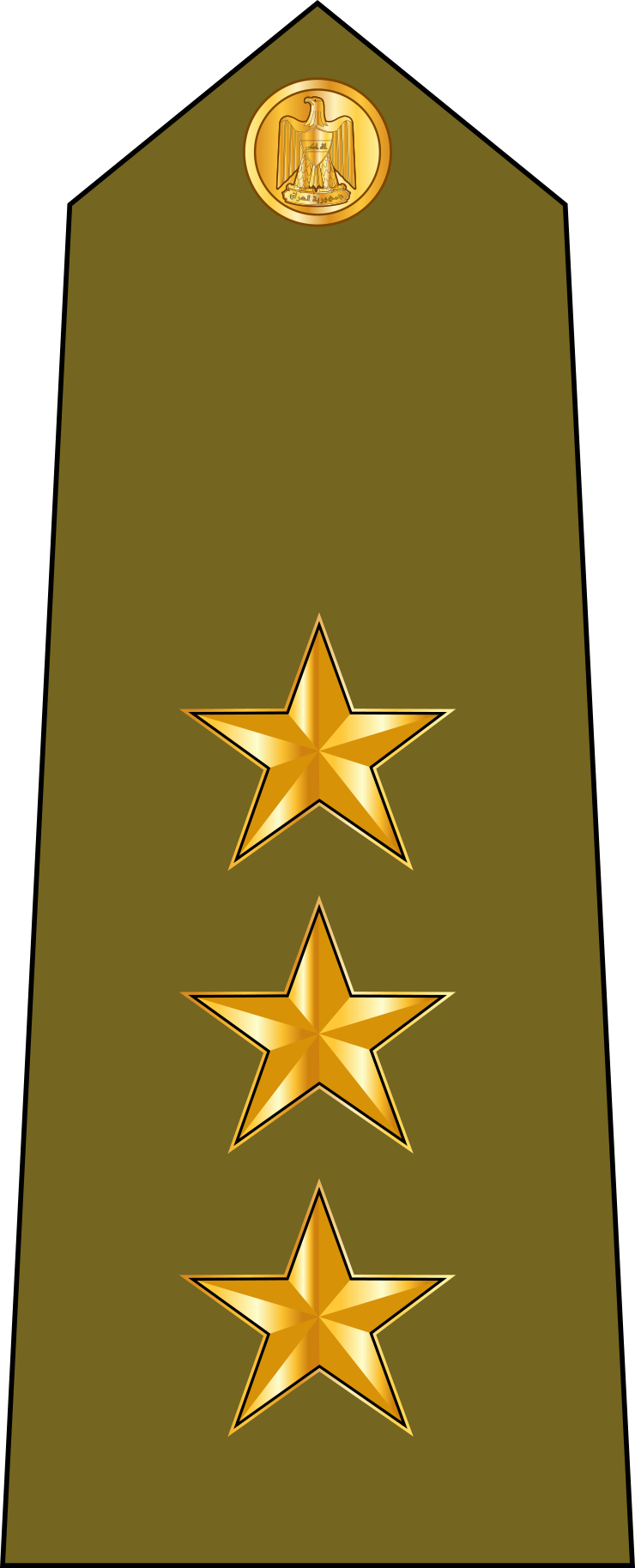
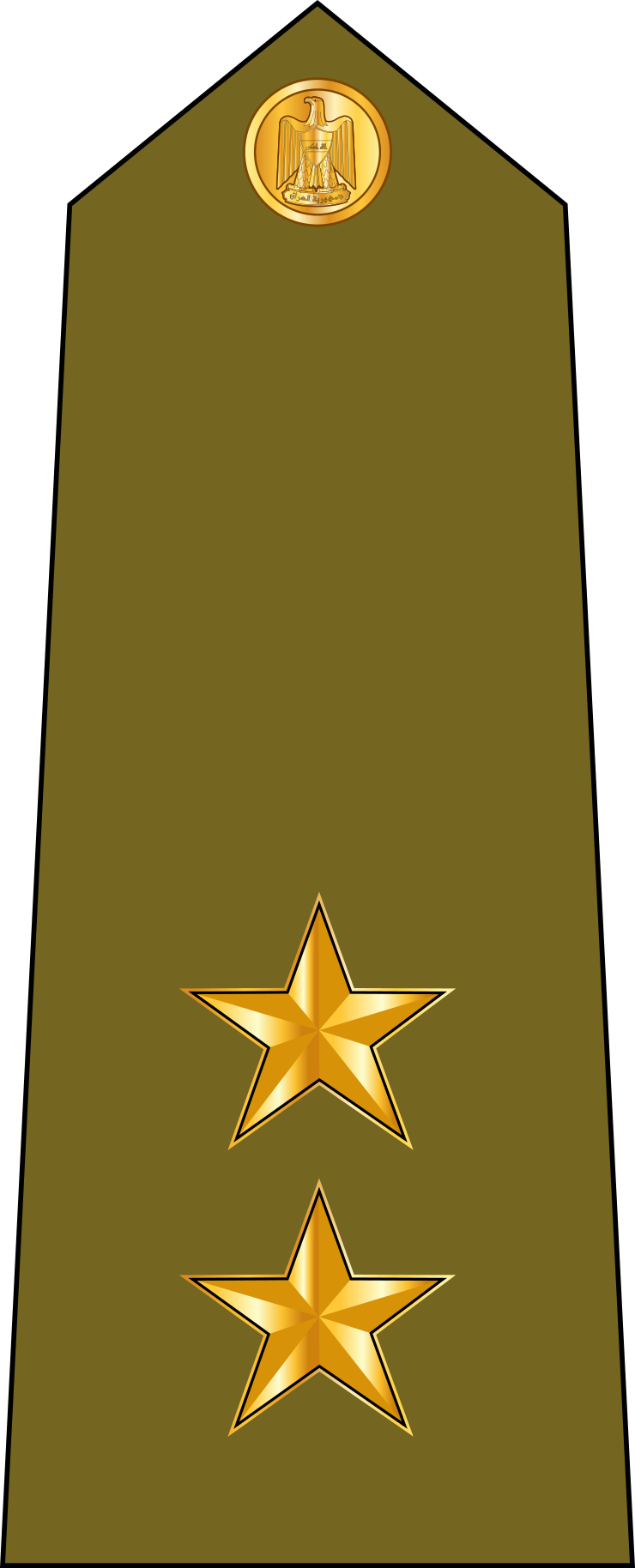
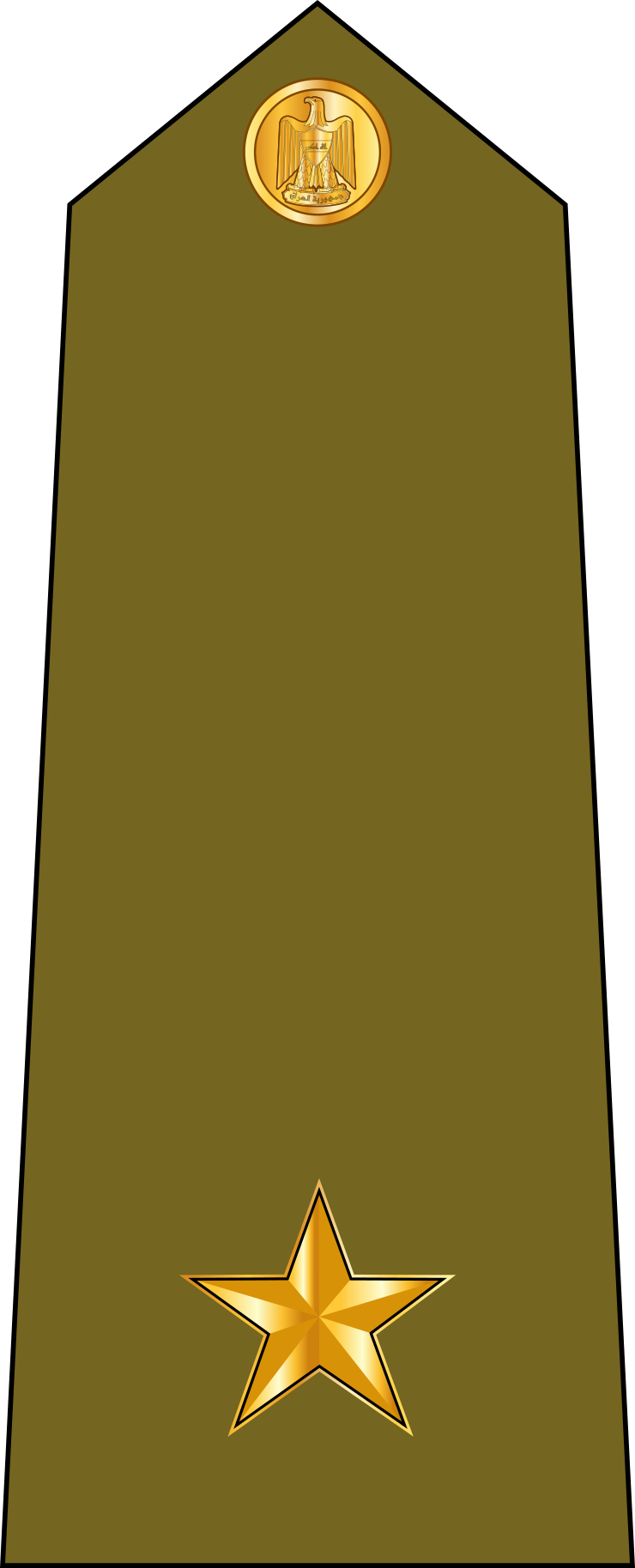
Rank group	General / flag officers					Senior officers			Junior officers
Iraqi Ground Forces
Iraqi Ground Forces	مشیر; Mushir	فريق أول; Fariq 'awal	فريق; Fariq	لواء; Liwa	عميد; Amid	عقيد; Aqid	مقدم; Muqaddam	رائد; Ra'id	نقيب; Naqib	ملازم أول; Mulazim awwal	ملازم; Mulazim
Iraqi Navy
Iraqi Navy	مشیر; Mushir	فريق أول; Fariq 'awal	فريق; Fariq	لواء; Liwa	عميد; Amid	عقيد; Aqid	مقدم; Muqaddam	رائد; Ra'id	نقيب; Naqib	ملازم أول; Mulazim awwal	ملازم; Mulazim
Iraqi Air Force
Iraqi Air Force	مشیر; Mushir	فريق أول; Fariq 'awal	فريق; Fariq	لواء; Liwa	عميد; Amid	عقيد; Aqid	مقدم; Muqaddam	رائد; Ra'id	نقيب; Naqib	ملازم أول; Mulazim awwal	ملازم; Mulazim
Rank group	General / flag officers					Senior officers			Junior officers

== Other ranks ==
The rank insignia of non-commissioned officers and enlisted personnel.

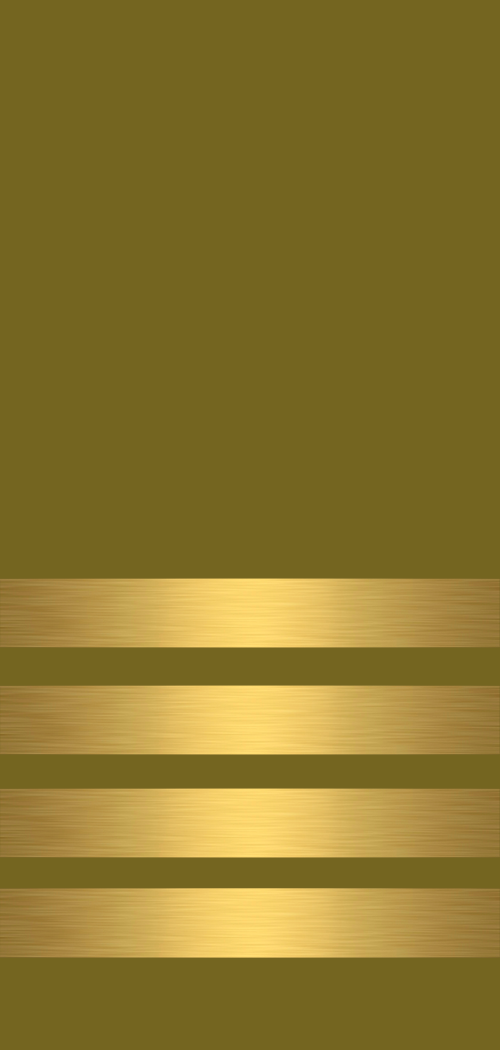
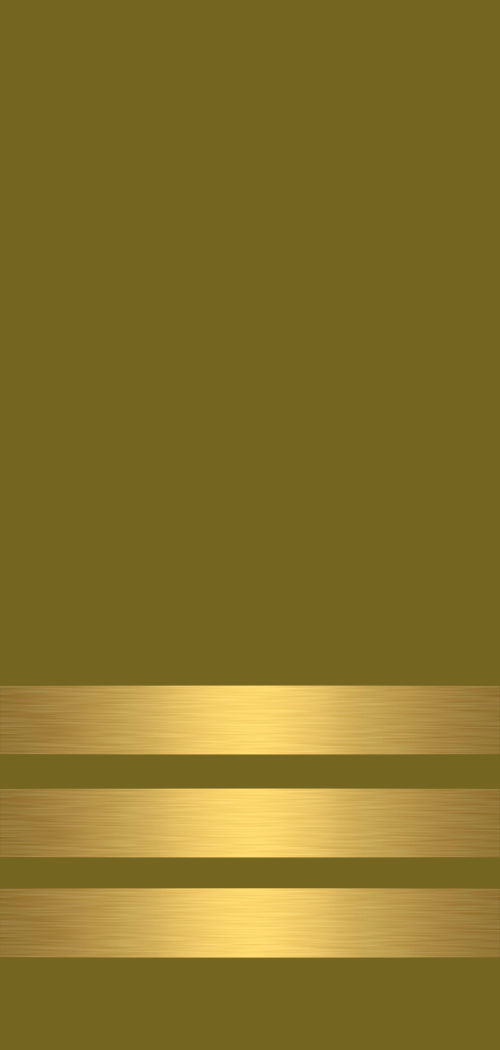
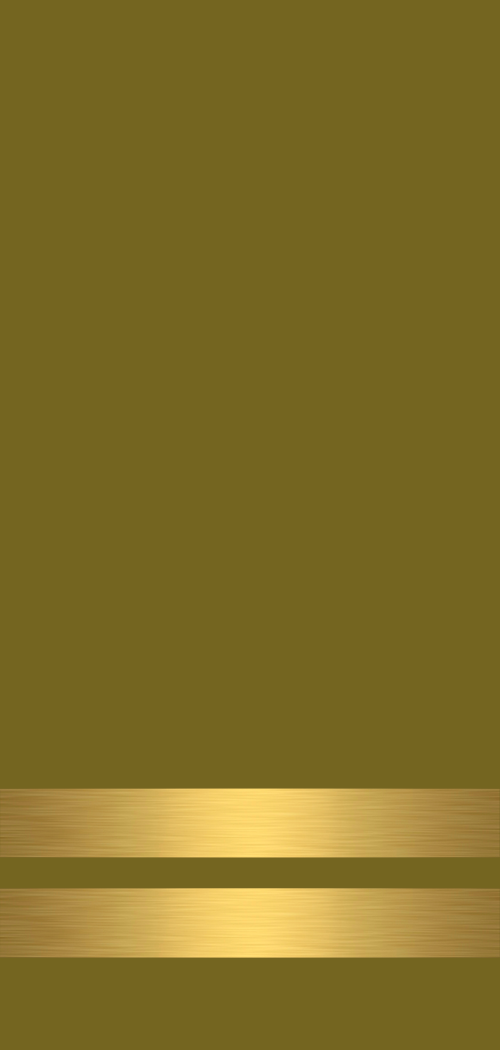
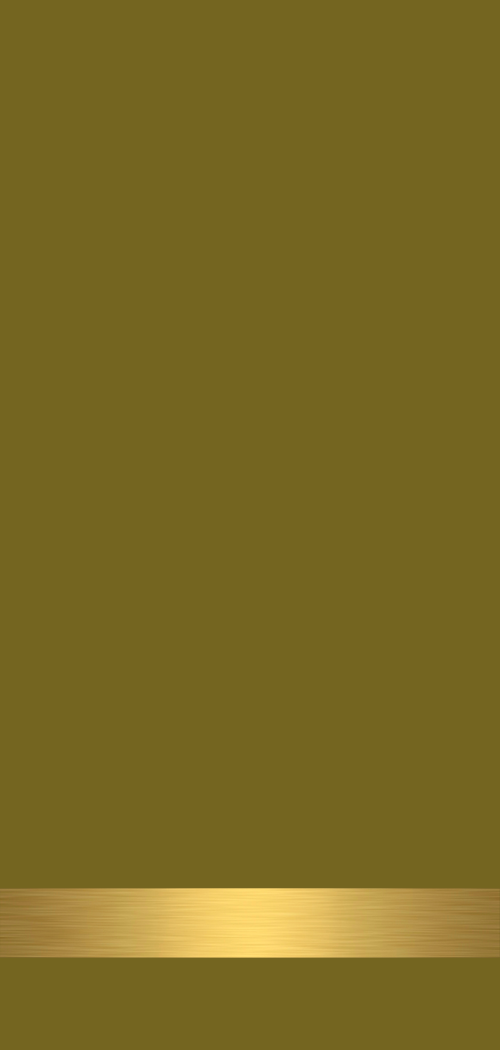
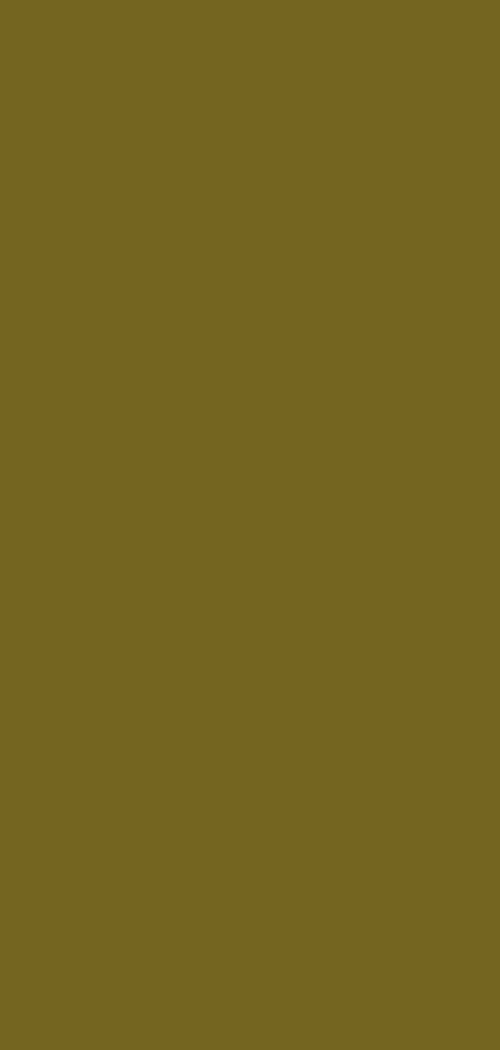
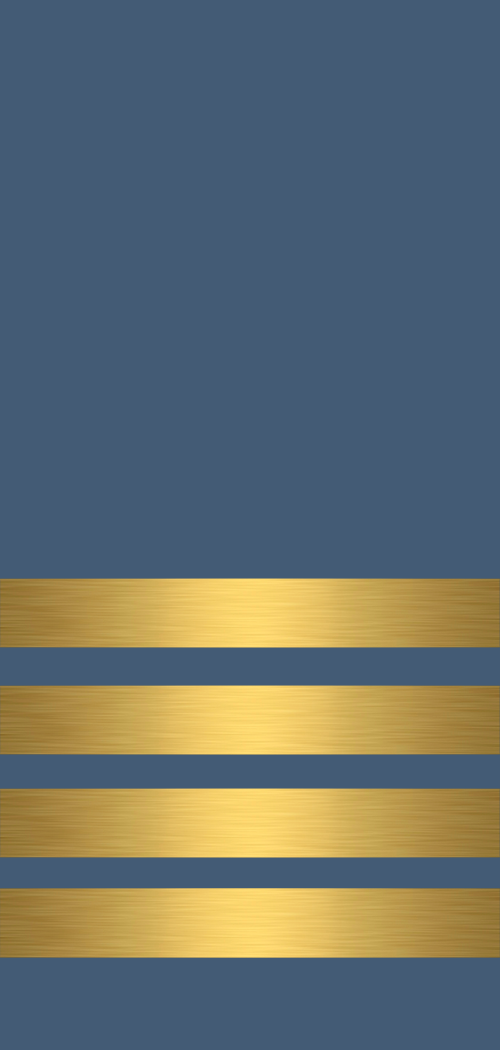
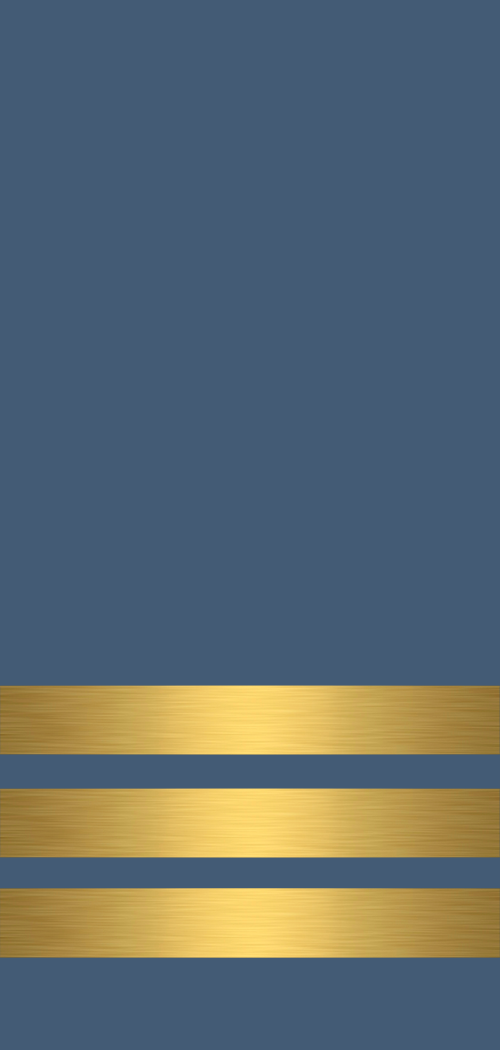
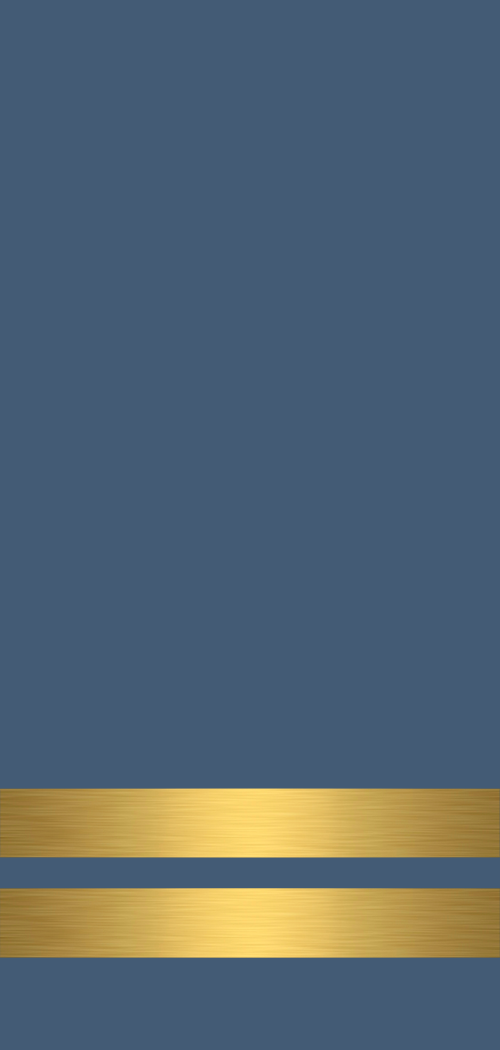
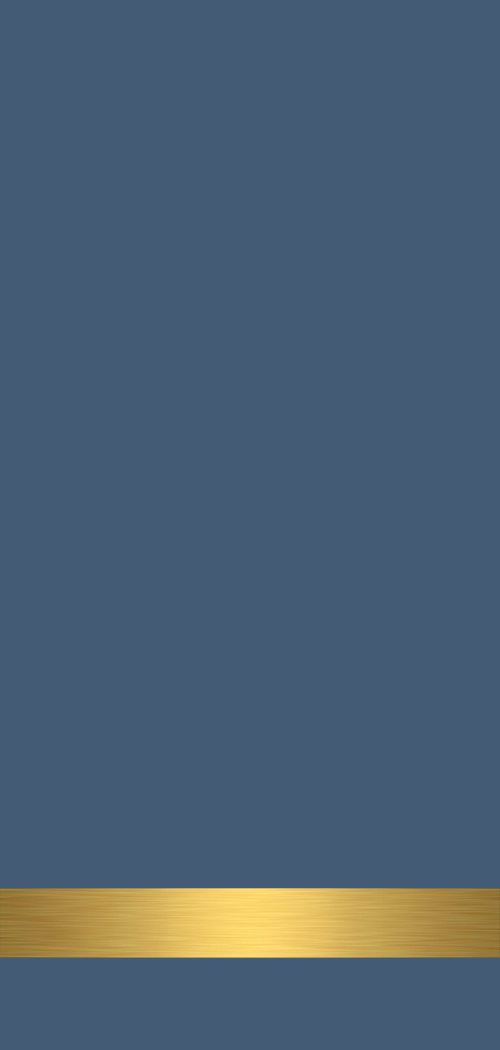
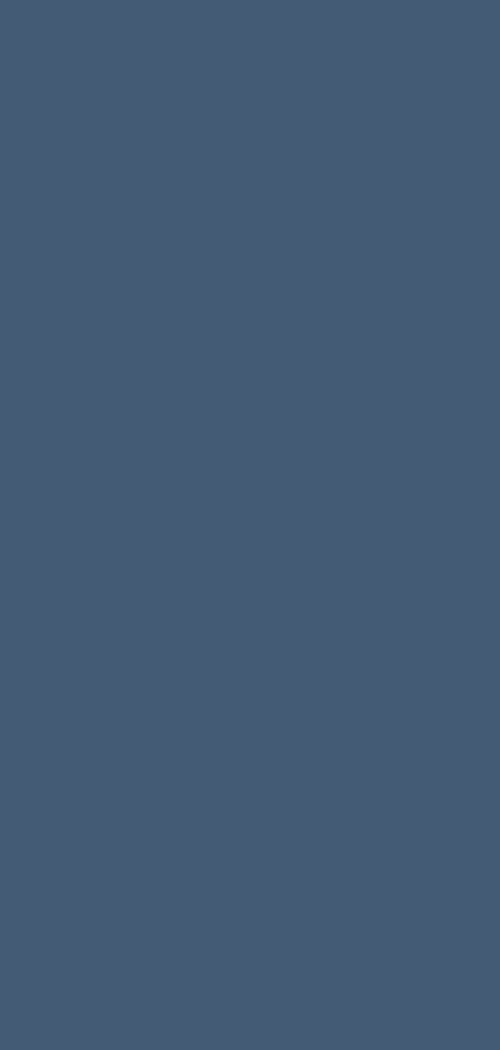
Rank group	Senior NCOs			Junior NCOs	Enlisted
Iraqi Ground Forces
Iraqi Ground Forces	نائب ضابط; Nayib dabit	رقيب أول; Raqib 'awal	رقیب; Raqib	عريف; Earif	جندي أول; Jundi awwal	جندي; Jundi
Iraqi Navy
Iraqi Navy	نائب ضابط; Nayib dabit	رقيب أول; Rayiys eurafa	رقيب; Arif	نائب عريف; Nāyīb arīf	جندي أول; Jundi 'awwal	جندي; Jundi
Iraqi Air Force
Iraqi Air Force	نائب ضابط; Nayib dabit	رقيب أول; Raqib 'awal	رقیب; Raqib	عريف; Earif	جندي أول; Jundi awwal	جندي; Jundi
Rank group	Senior NCOs			Junior NCOs	Enlisted
