= Comparative air force officer ranks of Arabophone countries =

Rank comparison chart of officers for air forces of Arabophone states.

== Officers ==
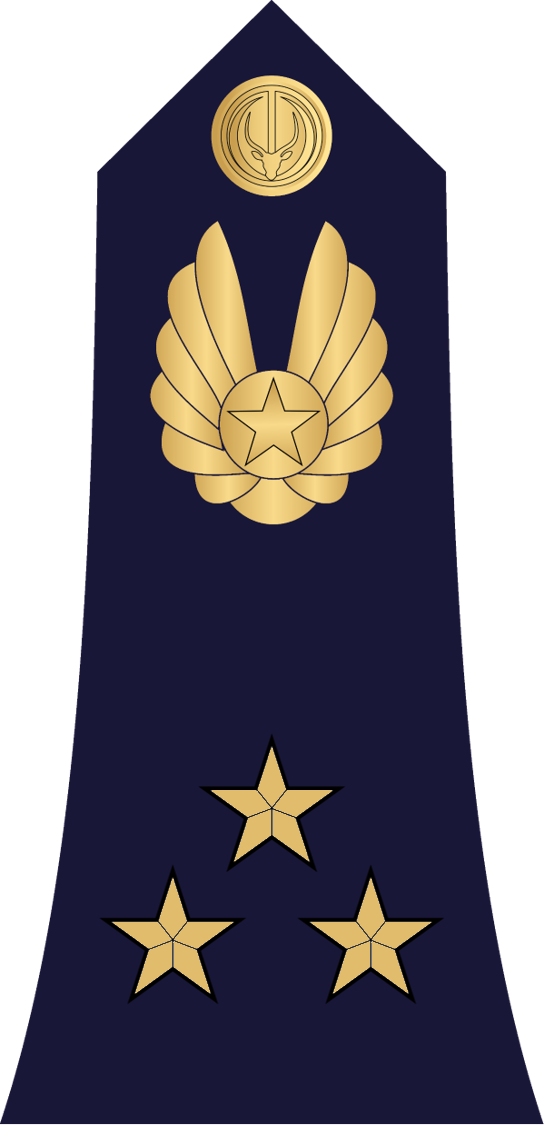
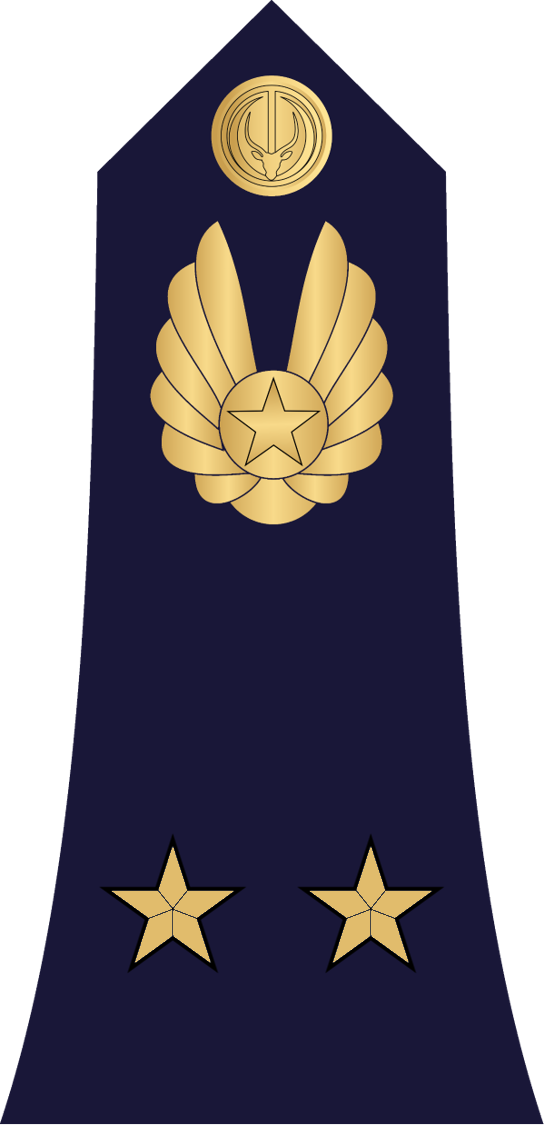
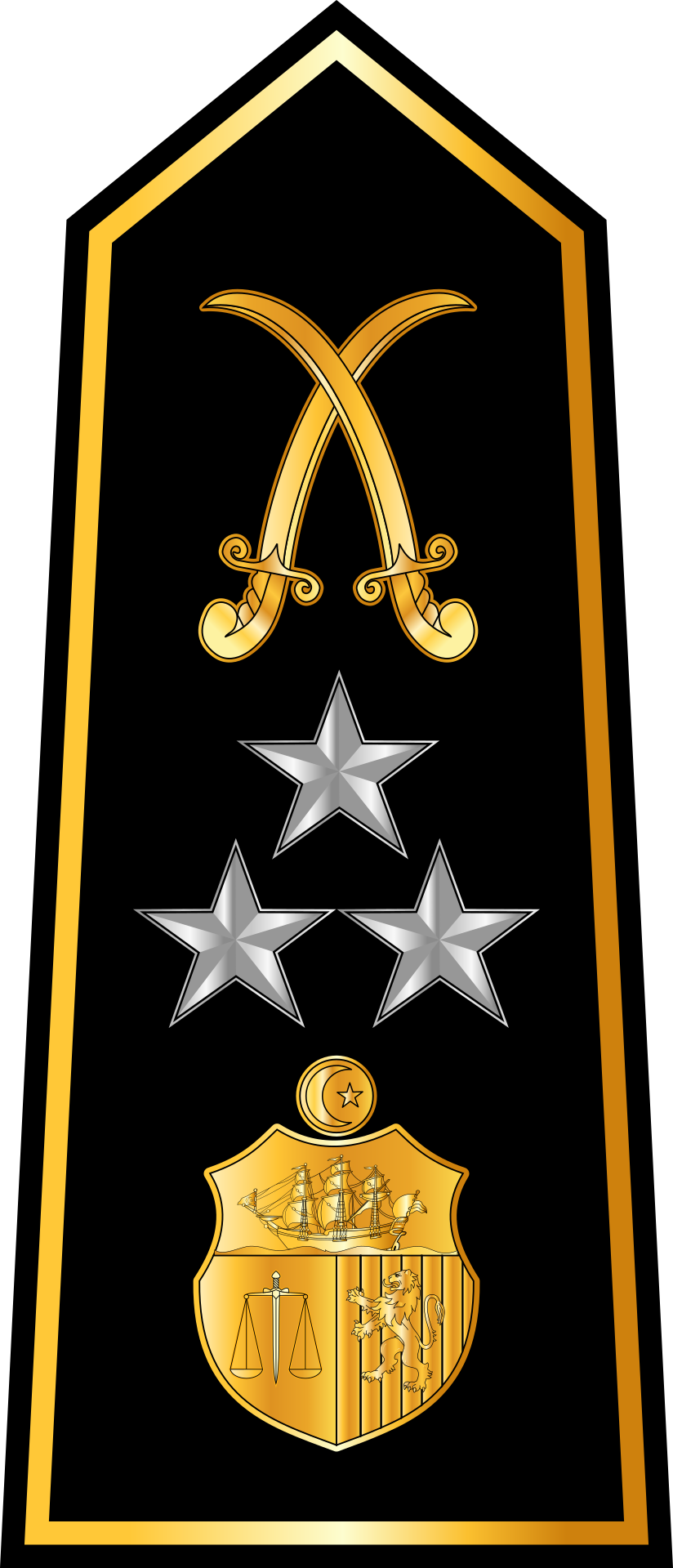
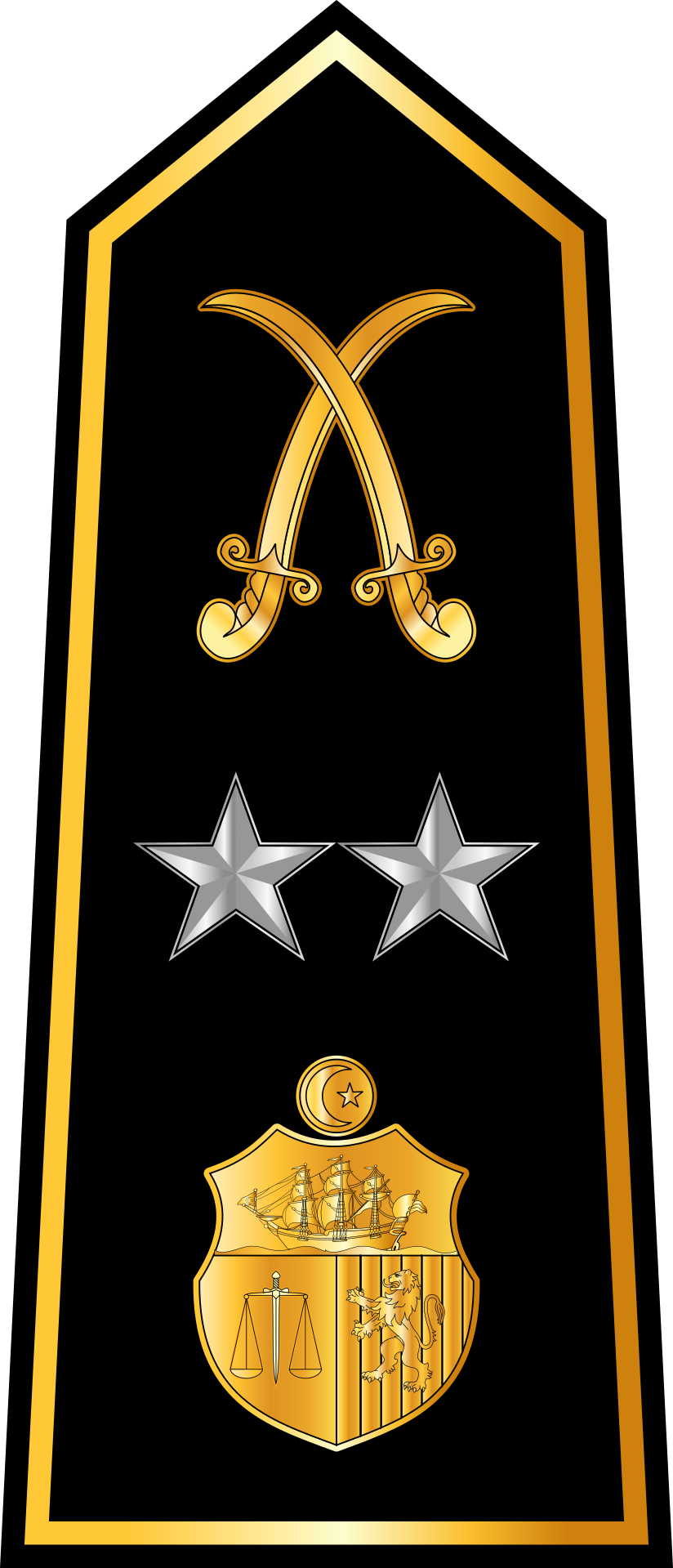
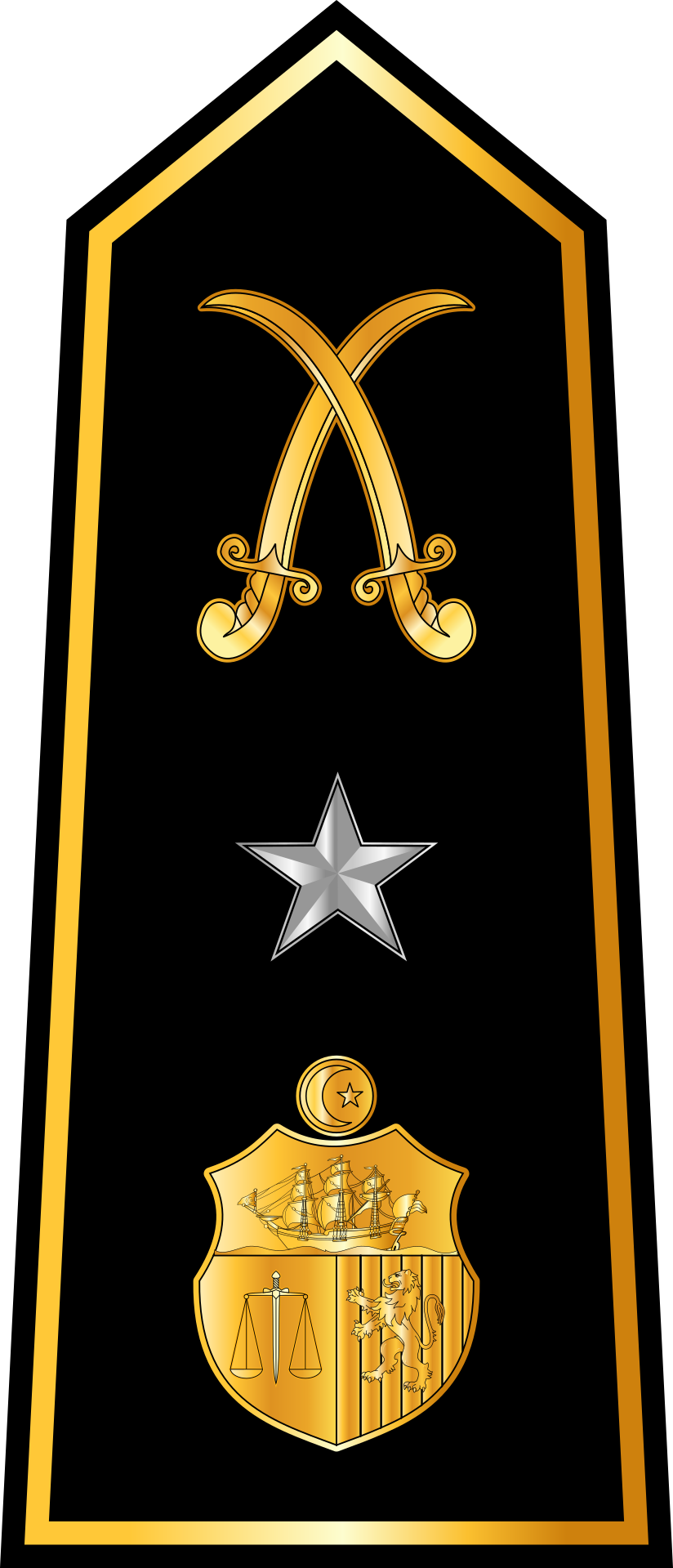
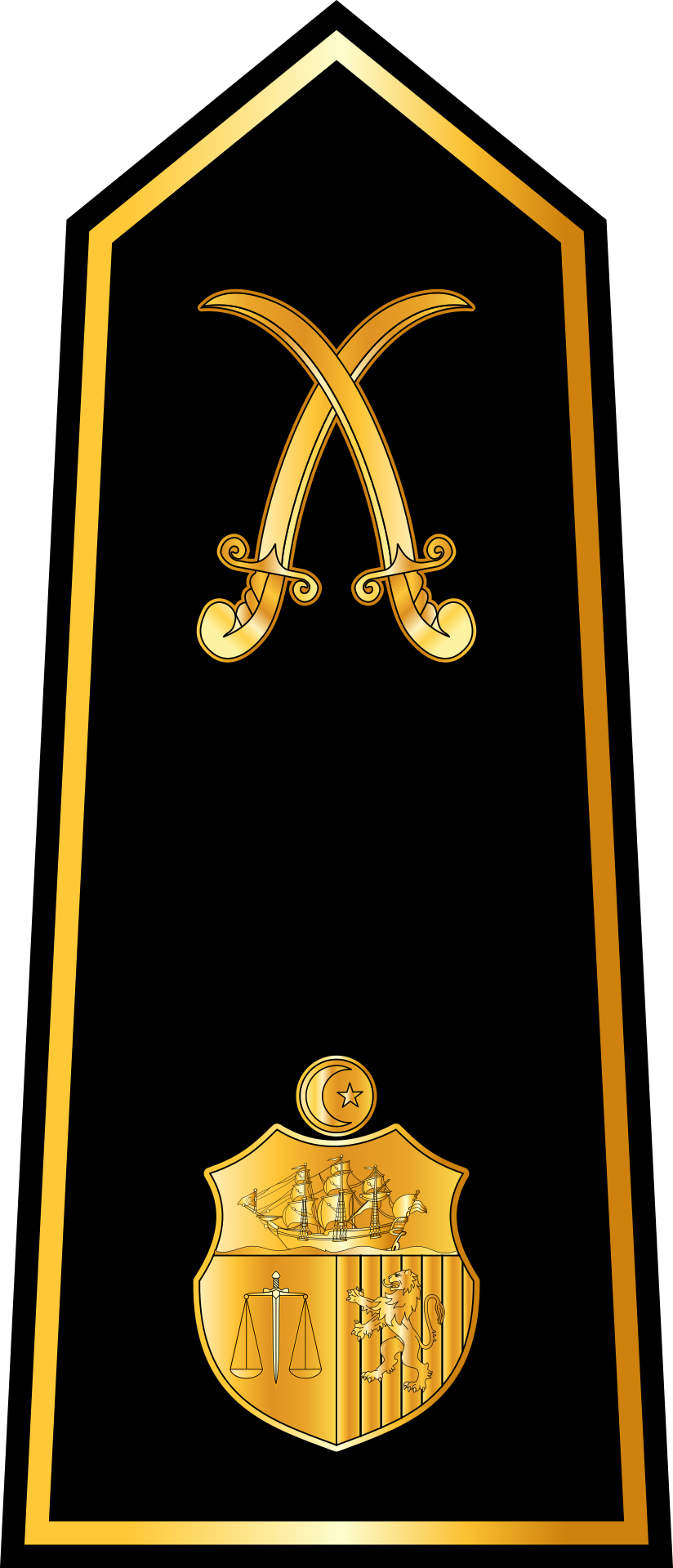
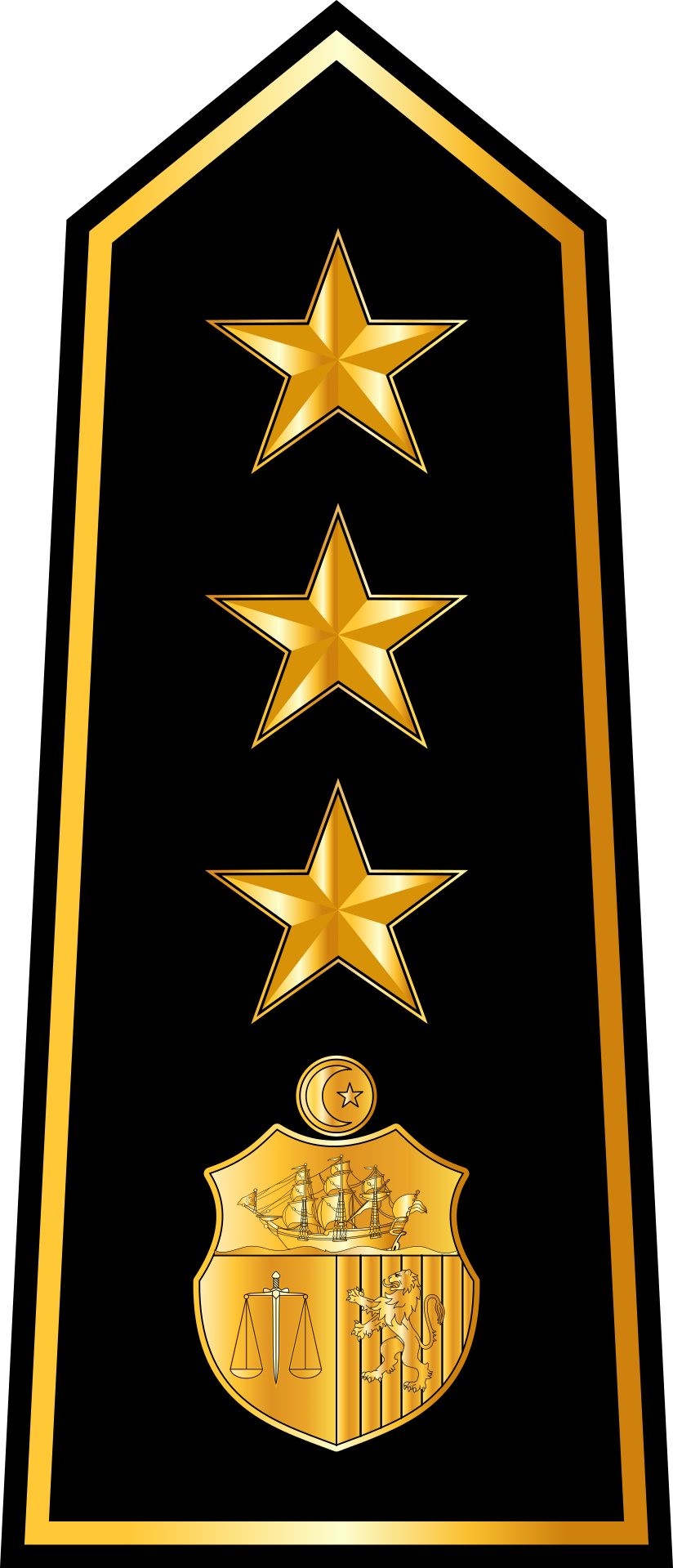
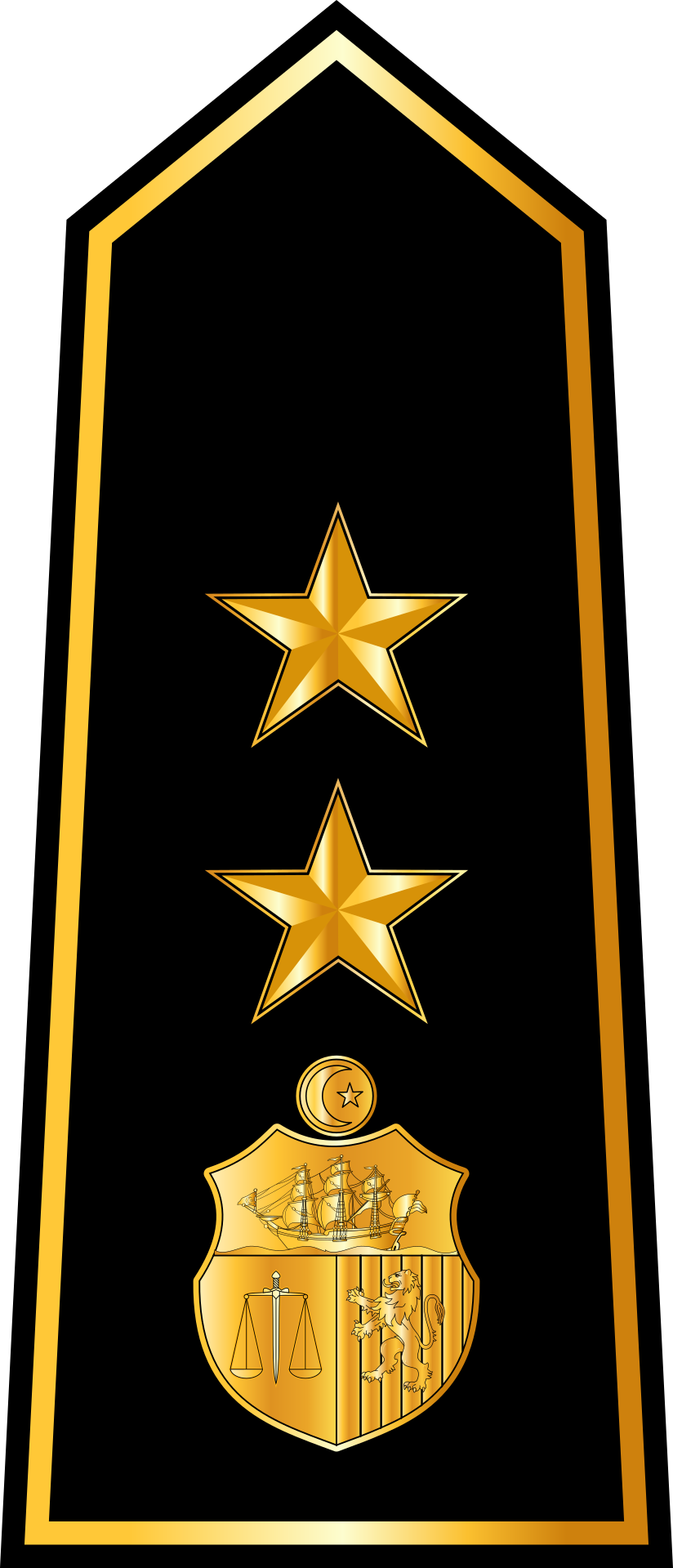
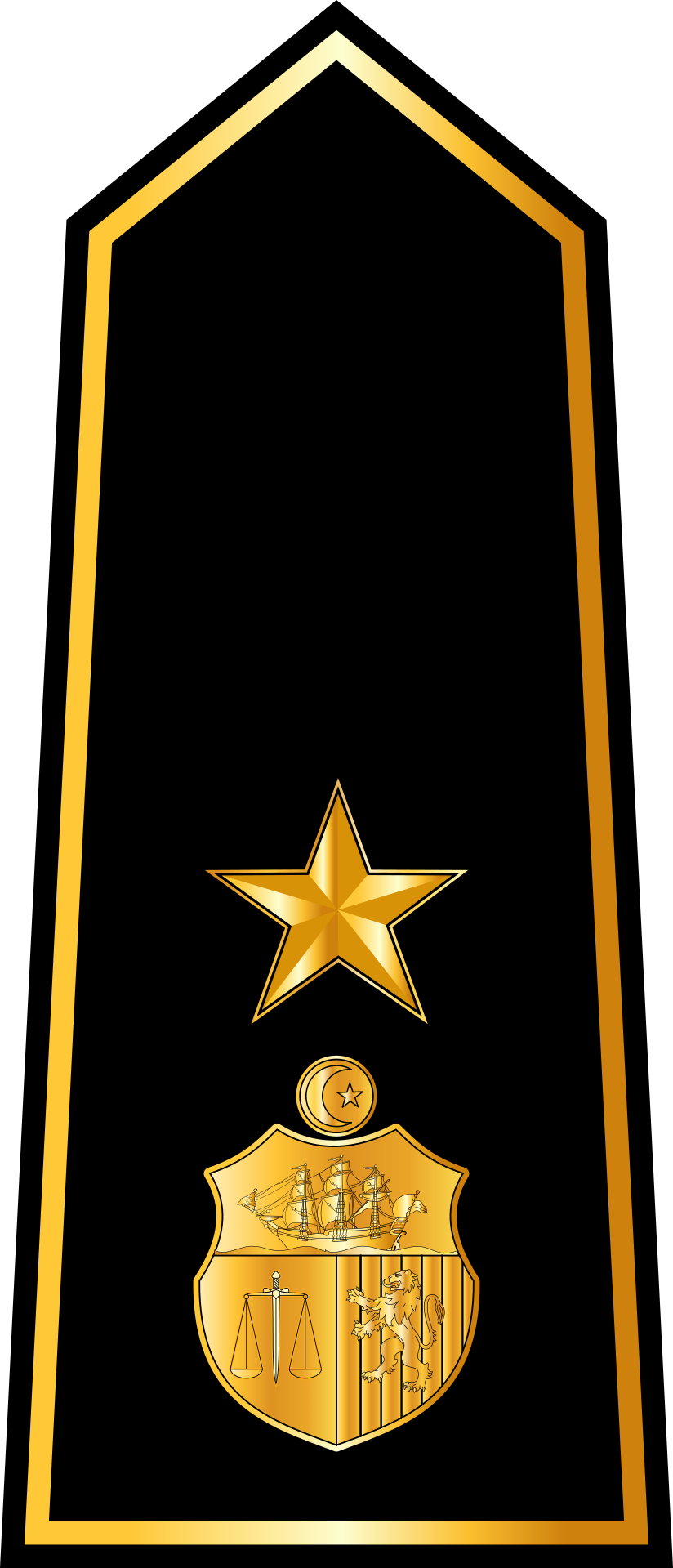
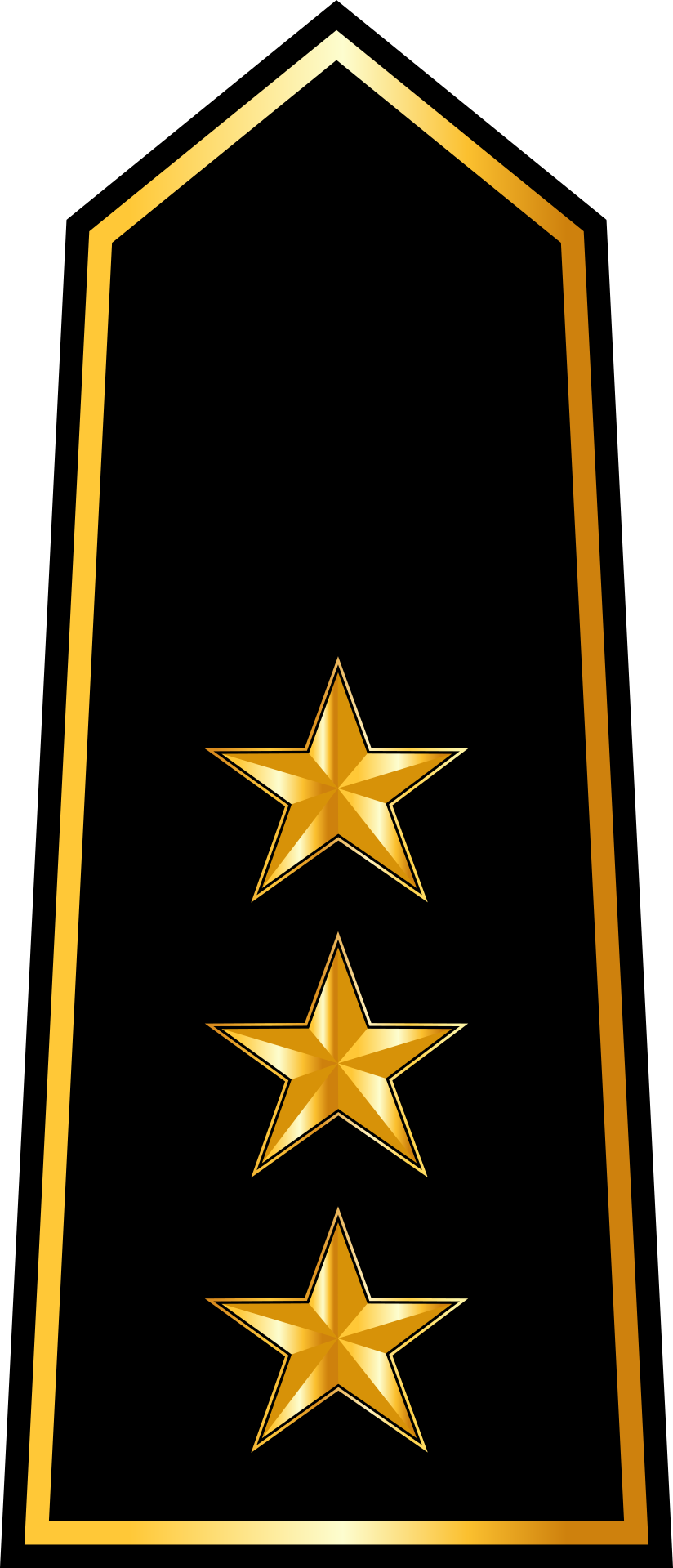
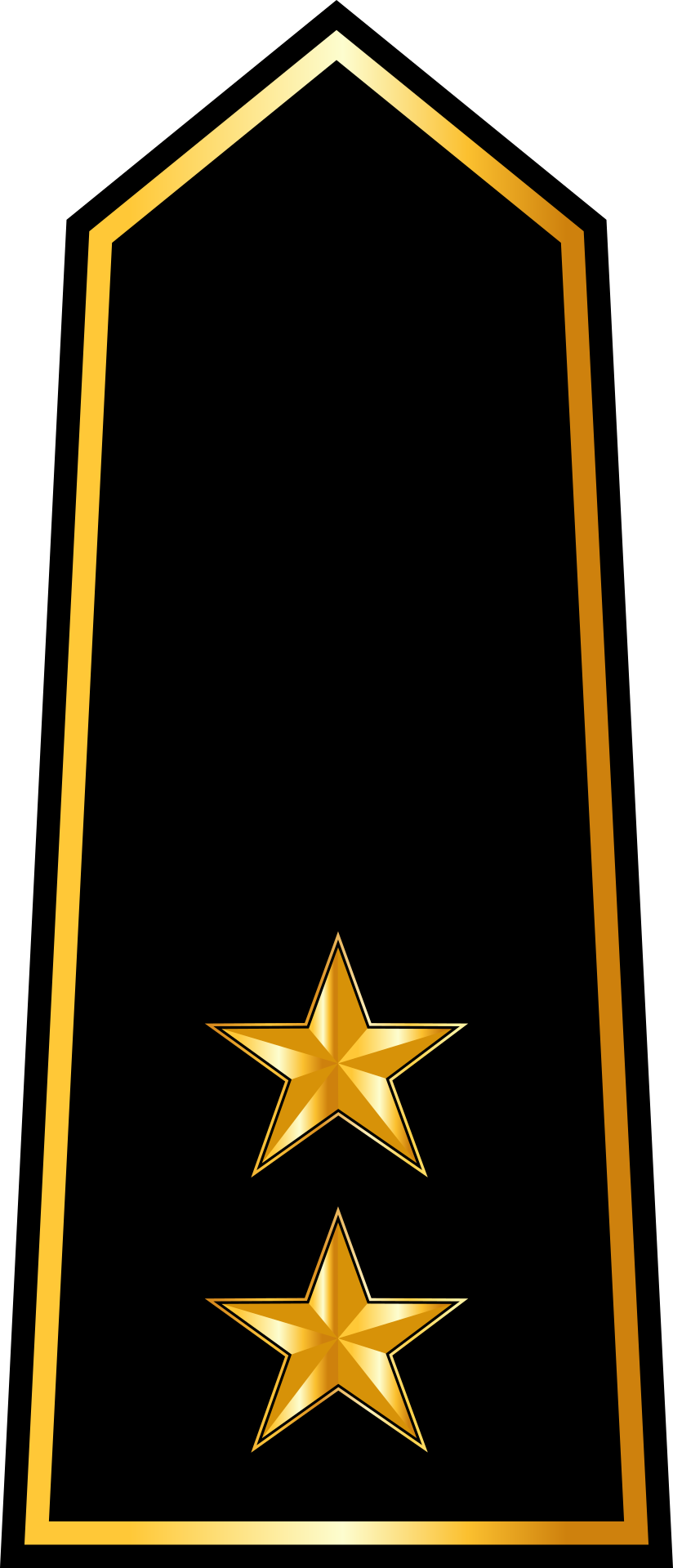
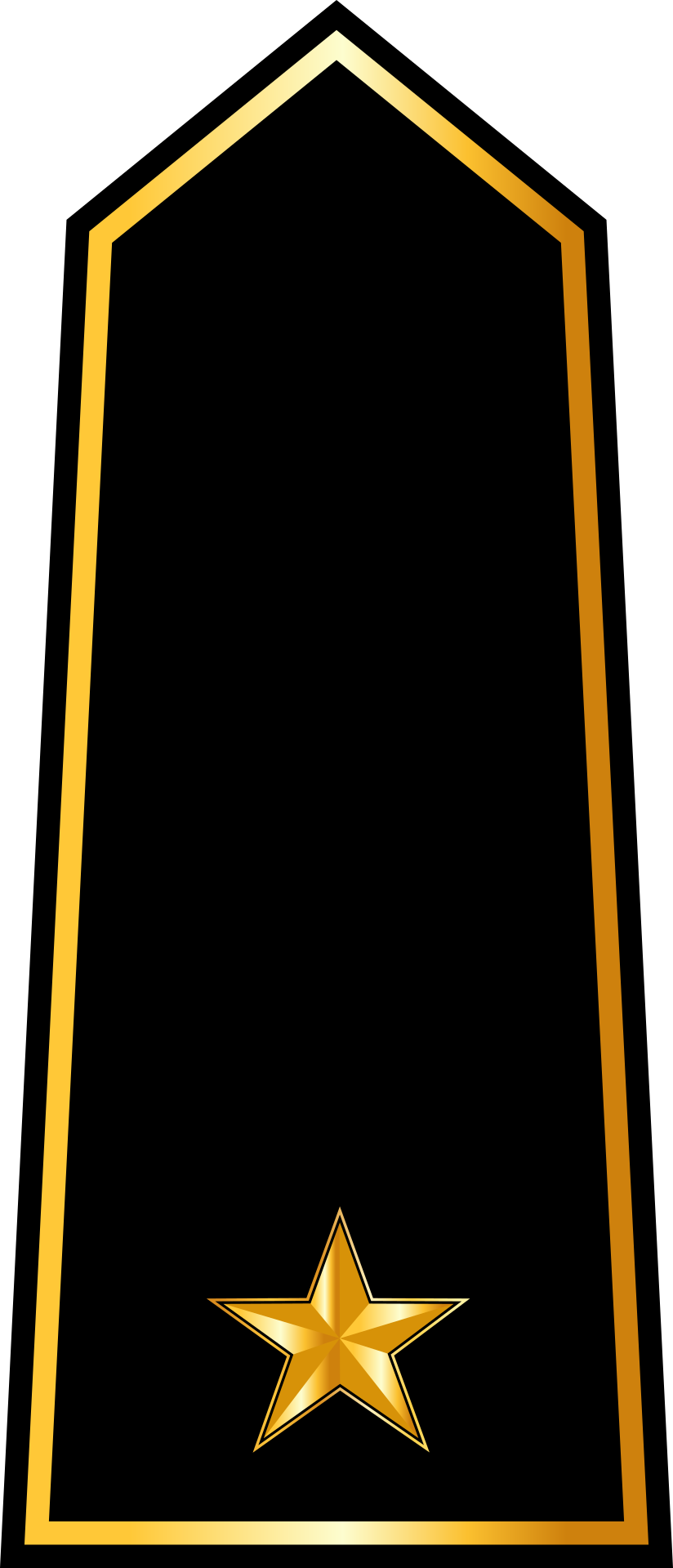
Rank group	General / flag officers					Senior officers				Junior officers
Algerian Air Force
Algerian Air Force		فريق أول; Fariq 'awal	فريق; Fariq	لواء; Liwa	عميد; Amid	عقيد; Aqid		مقدم; Muqaddam	رائد; Ra'id	نقيب; Naqib	ملازم أول; Mulazim awwal	ملازم; Mulazim
Algerian Air Force		Général d'armée	Général de corps d'armée	Général de division	Général	Colonel		Lieutenant-colonel	Commandant	Capitaine	Lieutenant	Sous-lieutenant
Royal Bahraini Air Force
Royal Bahraini Air Force	مشیر; Mushir	فريق أول; Fariq 'awal	فريق; Fariq	لواء; Liwa	عميد; Amid	عقيد; Aqid		مقدم; Muqaddam	رائد; Ra'id	نقيب; Naqib	ملازم أول; Mulazim awwal	ملازم; Mulazim
Chadian Air Force
Chadian Air Force				Général de division aérienne	Général de brigade aérienne	Colonel		Lieutenant-Colonel	Commandant	Capitaine	Lieutenant	Sous-Lieutenant
Djibouti Air Force
Djibouti Air Force					Général de brigade	Colonel		Lieutenant-colonel	Commandant	Capitaine	Lieutenant	Sous-lieutenant
Egyptian Air Force
Egyptian Air Force		فريق أول; Fariq 'awal	فريق; Fariq	لواء; Liwa	عميد; Amid	عقيد; Aqid		مقدم; Muqaddam	رائد; Ra'id	نقيب; Naqib	ملازم أول; Mulazim awwal	ملازم; Mulazim
Iraqi Air Force
Iraqi Air Force	مشیر; Mushir	فريق أول; Fariq 'awal	فريق; Fariq	لواء; Liwa	عميد; Amid	عقيد; Aqid		مقدم; Muqaddam	رائد; Ra'id	نقيب; Naqib	ملازم أول; Mulazim awwal	ملازم; Mulazim
Royal Jordanian Air Force
Royal Jordanian Air Force	مشیر; Mushir	فريق أول; Fariq 'awal	فريق; Fariq	لواء; Liwa	عميد; Amid	عقيد; Aqid		مقدم; Muqaddam	رائد; Ra'id	نقيب; Naqib	ملازم أول; Mulazim awwal	ملازم; Mulazim
Rank group	General / flag officers					Senior officers				Junior officers
Kuwait Air Force
Kuwait Air Force		فريق أول; Fariq 'awal	فريق; Fariq	لواء; Liwa	عميد; Amid	عقيد; Aqid		مقدم; Muqaddam	رائد; Ra'id	نقيب; Naqib	ملازم أول; Mulazim awwal	ملازم; Mulazim
Lebanese Air Force
Lebanese Air Force			عماد; Eimad	لواء; Liwa	عميد; Amid	عقيد; Aqid		مقدم; Muqaddam	رائد; Ra'id	نقيب; Naqib	ملازم أول; Mulazim awwal	ملازم; Mulazim
Libyan Air Force
Libyan Air Force	مشير; Mushir	فريق أول; Fariq 'awal	فريق; Fariq	لواء; Liwa	عميد; Amid	عقيد; Aqid		مقدم; Muqaddam	رائد; Ra'id	نقيب; Naqib	ملازم أول; Mulazim awwal	ملازم; Mulazim
Malian Air Force
Malian Air Force		Général d'armée	Général de corps d'armée	Général de division	Général de brigade	Colonel-major	Colonel	Lieutenant-colonel	Commandant	Capitaine	Lieutenant	Sous-lieutenant
Mauritania Islamic Air Force
Mauritania Islamic Air Force			فريق; Fariq	لواء; Liwa		عميد; Amid		مقدم; Muqaddam	رائد; Ra'id	نقيب; Naqib	ملازم أول; Mulazim awwal	ملازم; Mulazim
Royal Moroccan Air Force
Royal Moroccan Air Force		Général d'armée aerienne	Général de corps aerienne	Général de division aerienne	Général de brigade aerienne	Colonel major	Colonel	Lieutenant-colonel	Commandant	Capitaine	Lieutenant	Sous-lieutenant
Royal Air Force of Oman
Royal Air Force of Oman	مشیر; Mushir	فريق أول; Fariq 'awal	فريق; Fariq	لواء; Liwa	عميد; Amid	عقيد; Aqid		مقدم; Muqaddam	رائد; Ra'id	نقيب; Naqib	ملازم أول; Mulazim awwal	ملازم; Mulazim
Qatar Emiri Air Force
Qatar Emiri Air Force		فريق أول; Fariq 'awal	فريق; Fariq	لواء; Liwa	عميد; Amid	عقيد; Aqid		مقدم; Muqaddam	رائد; Ra'id	نقيب; Naqib	ملازم أول; Mulazim awwal	ملازم; Mulazim
Royal Saudi Air Force
Royal Saudi Air Force		فريق أول; Fariq 'awal	فريق; Fariq	لواء; Liwa	عميد; Amid	عقيد; Aqid		مقدم; Muqaddam	رائد; Ra'id	نقيب; Naqib	ملازم أول; Mulazim awwal	ملازم; Mulazim
Rank group	General / flag officers					Senior officers				Junior officers
Somali Air Force
Somali Air Force			Sareeye guud	Sareeye gaas	Sareeye guuto	Gashaanle sare		Gashaanle dhexe	Gashaanle	Dhamme	Laba xídígle	Xídígle
Sudanese Air Force
Sudanese Air Force	مشیر; Mushir	فريق أول; Fariq 'awal	فريق; Fariq	لواء; Liwa	عميد; Amid	عقيد; Aqid		مقدم; Muqaddam	رائد; Ra'id	نقيب; Naqib	ملازم أول; Mulazim awwal	ملازم; Mulazim
Syrian Air Force
Syrian Air Force	فريق; Fariq	عماد أول; Eimad 'awal	عماد; Eimad	لواء; Alliwa'	عميد; Amid	عقيد; Aqid		مقدم; Muqaddam	رائد; Ra'id	نقيب; Naqib	ملازم أول; Mulazim awwal	ملازم; Mulazim
Tunisian Air Force
Tunisian Air Force			فريق أول; Fariq 'awal	فريق; Fariq	أمير لواء 'amir liwa'	عميد; Amid	عقيد; Aqid	مقدم; Muqaddam	رائد; Ra'id	نقيب; Naqib	ملازم أول; Mulazim awwal	ملازم; Mulazim
Tunisian Air Force			Général de corps d'armée	Général de division	Général de brigade	Colonel-major	Colonel	Lieutenant-colonel	Commandant	Capitaine	Lieutenant	Sous-lieutenant
United Arab Emirates Air Force
United Arab Emirates Air Force		فريق أول; Fariq 'awal	فريق; Fariq	لواء; Liwa	عميد; Amid	عقيد; Aqid		مقدم; Muqaddam	رائد; Ra'id	نقيب; Naqib	ملازم أول; Mulazim awwal	ملازم; Mulazim
Yemeni Air Force
Yemeni Air Force	مشیر; Mushir	فريق أول; Fariq 'awal	فريق; Fariq	لواء; Liwa	عميد; Amid	عقيد; Aqid		مقدم; Muqaddam	رائد; Ra'id	نقيب; Naqib	ملازم أول; Mulazim awwal	ملازم ثان; Mulazim than
Rank group	General / flag officers					Senior officers				Junior officers
