= Comparative navy officer ranks of Arabophone countries =

Rank comparison chart of officers for navies of Arabophone states.

== Officers ==
Rank group	General/flag officers					Senior officers				Junior officers
Algerian National Navy
Algerian National Navy		فريق أول; Fariq 'awal	فريق; Fariq	لواء; Liwa	عميد; Amid	عقيد; Aqid		مقدم; Muqaddam	رائد; Ra'id	نقيب; Naqib	ملازم أول; Mulazim awwal	ملازم; Mulazim
Algerian National Navy		Général d'armée	Général de corps d'armée	Général de division	Général	Colonel		Lieutenant-colonel	Commandant	Capitaine	Lieutenant	Sous-lieutenant
Royal Bahrain Naval Force
Royal Bahrain Naval Force	مشیر; Mushir	فريق أول; Fariq 'awal	فريق; Fariq	لواء; Liwa	عميد; Amid	عقيد; Aqid		مقدم; Muqaddam	رائد; Ra'id	نقيب; Naqib	ملازم أول; Mulazim awwal	ملازم; Mulazim
Djiboutian Navy
Djiboutian Navy					Général de brigade	Colonel		Lieutenant-colonel	Commandant	Capitaine	Lieutenant	Sous-lieutenant
Egyptian Navy
Egyptian Navy		فريق أول; Fariq 'awal	فريق; Fariq	لواء; Liwa	عميد; Amid	عقيد; Aqid		مقدم; Muqaddam	رائد; Ra'id	نقيب; Naqib	ملازم أول; Mulazim awwal	ملازم; Mulazim
Iraqi Navy
Iraqi Navy	مشیر; Mushir	فريق أول; Fariq 'awal	فريق; Fariq	لواء; Liwa	عميد; Amid	عقيد; Aqid		مقدم; Muqaddam	رائد; Ra'id	نقيب; Naqib	ملازم أول; Mulazim awwal	ملازم; Mulazim
Royal Jordanian Navy
Royal Jordanian Navy	مشیر; Mushir	فريق أول; Fariq 'awal	فريق; Fariq	لواء; Liwa	عميد; Amid	عقيد; Aqid		مقدم; Muqaddam	رائد; Ra'id	نقيب; Naqib	ملازم أول; Mulazim awwal	ملازم; Mulazim
Rank group	General/flag officers					Senior officers				Junior officers
Kuwait Navy
Kuwait Navy		فريق أول; Fariq 'awal	فريق; Fariq	لواء; Liwa	عميد; Amid	عقيد; Aqid		مقدم; Muqaddam	رائد; Ra'id	نقيب; Naqib	ملازم أول; Mulazim awwal	ملازم; Mulazim
Lebanese Navy
Lebanese Navy			عماد; Eimad	لواء; Liwa	عميد; Amid	عقيد; Aqid		مقدم; Muqaddam	رائد; Ra'id	نقيب; Naqib	ملازم أول; Mulazim awwal	ملازم; Mulazim
Libyan Navy
Libyan Navy	مشير; Mushir	فريق أول; Fariq 'awal	فريق; Fariq	لواء; Liwa	عميد; Amid	عقيد; Aqid		مقدم; Muqaddam	رائد; Ra'id	نقيب; Naqib	ملازم أول; Mulazim awwal	ملازم; Mulazim
Mauritanian Navy
Mauritanian Navy			فريق; Fariq	لواء; Liwa		عميد بحري; Amid bahriun		مقدم بحري; Muqaddam bahriun	رائد بحري; Ra'id bahriun	نقيب بحري; Naqib bahriun	ملازم أول بحري; Mulazim awwal bahriun	ملازم بحري; Mulazim bahriun
Royal Moroccan Navy
Royal Moroccan Navy		Amiral	Vice-amiral d'escadre	Vice-amiral	Contre-amiral	Capitaine de vaisseau-major	Capitaine de vaisseau	Capitaine de frégate	Capitaine de corvette	Lieutenant de vaisseau	Enseigne de vaisseau de 1^{re} classe	Enseigne de vaisseau de 2^{e} classe
Royal Navy of Oman
Royal Navy of Oman	مشیر; Mushir	فريق أول; Fariq 'awal	فريق; Fariq	لواء; Liwa	عميد; Amid	عقيد; Aqid		مقدم; Muqaddam	رائد; Ra'id	نقيب; Naqib	ملازم أول; Mulazim awwal	ملازم; Mulazim
Qatari Emiri Navy
Qatari Emiri Navy		فريق أول; Fariq 'awal	فريق; Fariq	لواء; Liwa	عميد; Amid	عقيد; Aqid		مقدم; Muqaddam	رائد; Ra'id	نقيب; Naqib	ملازم أول; Mulazim awwal	ملازم; Mulazim
Royal Saudi Navy
Royal Saudi Navy		فريق أول; Fariq 'awal	فريق; Fariq	لواء; Liwa	عميد; Amid	عقيد; Aqid		مقدم; Muqaddam	رائد; Ra'id	نقيب; Naqib	ملازم أول; Mulazim awwal	ملازم; Mulazim
Rank group	General/flag officers					Senior officers				Junior officers
Somali Navy
Somali Navy			Admiraal guud	Admiraal gaas	Admiraal guuto	Gashaanle sare		Gashaanle dhexe	Gashaanle	Dhamme	Laba xídígle	Xídígle
Somaliland Coast Guard
Somaliland Coast Guard			Admiraal kuxigeenka	Admiraal gaas	Admiraal guuto	Gashaanle sare		Gashaanle dhexe	Gashaanle	Dhamme	Laba xídígle	Xídígle
Sudanese Navy
Sudanese Navy	مشیر; Mushir	فريق أول; Fariq 'awal	فريق; Fariq	لواء; Liwa	عميد; Amid	عقيد; Aqid		مقدم; Muqaddam	رائد; Ra'id	نقيب; Naqib	ملازم أول; Mulazim awwal	ملازم; Mulazim
Syrian Navy
Syrian Navy	فريق; Fariq	عماد أول; Eimad 'awal	عماد; Eimad	لواء; Alliwa'	عميد; Amid	عقيد; Aqid		مقدم; Muqaddam	رائد; Ra'id	نقيب; Naqib	ملازم أول; Mulazim awwal	ملازم; Mulazim
Tunisian National Navy
Tunisian National Navy			فريق أول بالبحرية; Fariq 'awal bialbahria	فريق بالبحرية; Fariq bialbahria	أمير لواء بالبحرية 'amir liwa' bialbahria	عميد بالبحرية; Amid bialbahria	عقيد بالبحرية; Aqid bialbahria	مقدم بالبحرية; Muqaddam bialbahria	رائد بالبحرية; Ra'id bialbahria	نقيب بالبحرية; Naqib bialbahria	ملازم أول بالبحرية; Mulazim 'awal bialbahria	ملازم بالبحرية; Mulazim bialbahria
Tunisian National Navy			Amiral	Vice-amiral	Contre-amiral	Capitaine de vaisseau major	Capitaine de vaisseau	Capitaine de frégate	Capitaine de corvette	Lieutenant de vaisseau	Enseigne de vaisseau de 1^{re} classe	Enseigne de vaisseau de 2^{e} classe
United Arab Emirates Navy
United Arab Emirates Navy		فريق أول; Fariq 'awal	فريق; Fariq	لواء; Liwa	عميد; Amid	عقيد; Aqid		مقدم; Muqaddam	رائد; Ra'id	نقيب; Naqib	ملازم أول; Mulazim awwal	ملازم; Mulazim
Yemeni Navy
Yemeni Navy					عميد; Amid	عقيد; Aqid		مقدم; Muqaddam	رائد; Ra'id	نقيب; Naqib	ملازم أول; Mulazim awwal	ملازم ثان; Mulazim than
Rank group	General/flag officers					Senior officers				Junior officers
