= Mülazım =

Arab military rank

Military ranks in the late Ottoman period
Navy (1909-1916)	Navy (1916-)	Army

Officers
Müşir Amiral Pasha	Müşir Amiral	Müşir
Birinci Ferik Amiral Pasha	Birinci Ferik Amiral	Birinci Ferik
Ferik Amiral Pasha	Ferik Amiral	Ferik
Liva Amiral Pasha	Liva Amiral	Mirliva
- Komodor
Kalyon Kaptanı	Miralay	Miralay
Fırkateyn Kaptanı	Fırkateyn Kaptanı	Kaymakam
Korvet Kaptanı	Korvet Kaptanı	Binbaşı
Birinci Sınıf Yüzbaşı	Kıdemli Yüzbaşı	Kolağası
Yüzbaşı	Yüzbaşı	Yüzbaşı
Mülâzım-ı evvel	Mülazım	Mülâzım-ı evvel
Mülâzım-ı sani		Mülâzım-ı sani
Mühendis	Mühendis	

Mulāzim (Arabic: ملازم; Ottoman Turkish: Mülazım) is a junior officer rank in many armed forces of the Arab world, roughly equivalent to lieutenant. The rank can usually be split into three different grades:

- Mulāzim (Arabic: ملازم, lit. 'assistant')
- Mulāzim 'awwal (Arabic: ملازم أول, lit. 'First assistant')
- Mulāzim thānin (Arabic: ملازم ثان, lit. 'Second assistant')

== History ==
In James Henry Skene's 1851 review of the Ottoman military, he noted that Mulazim were paid 280-350 piastres per month (including rations), perhaps more than contemporary British soldiers; as officers, their European-influenced uniforms included gold epaulettes, and distinctive lace on their cuffs as a mark of rank.

== Influences ==
- In the usage of the Mahdist State, a Mülazım was a member of the khalifa's bodyguard.

== See also ==
- Comparative army officer ranks of Arabophone countries
