= Ferik (rank) =

Military rank in Arab-speaking states

Ferik (Arabic: فريق, romanized: Fariq) is a military rank used in the militaries of many Arab nations, and formerly of the Ottoman Armed Forces. Usually, it ranks below Fariq 'awal (Arabic: فريق أول) and above Liwa (Arabic: لواء).

== Ottoman and Turkish use ==
It corresponds to a corps general (modern Turkish: Korgeneral) in the modern Turkish Army. The rank was junior to the Birinci Ferîk/Ferîk-i Evvel (Lieutenant General) and superior to the rank Mirliva (Brigade general) in the Ottoman Army and the pre-1935 Turkish Army.

The collar mark (later shoulder mark) and cap (until 1933) of a Ferîk had three stripes and two stars during the early years of the Turkish Republic.

The rank of ferîk was abolished on November 26, 1934, in accordance with Article 3 of Law No. 2590 on the Abolition of Nicknames and Titles. With Decree No. 2295, issued on April 9, 1935, the equivalent of the ferîk rank was designated as korgeneral for Army ferîks and koramiral for Navy ferîks.

== Current use ==
The rank of Fariq is usually equivalent to the Anglophone ranks of lieutenant general, vice admiral and air marshal, depending on the service branch.

	Army	Navy	Air Force
Algerian People's National Armed Forces			
French	Général de corps d'armée		
Bahrain Defence Force			
Egyptian Armed Forces			
Iraqi Armed Forces			
Jordanian Armed Forces			
Kuwait Military Forces			
Libyan Armed Forces			
Armed Forces of Mauritania			
Sultan of Oman's Armed Forces			
Qatar Armed Forces			
Armed Forces of Saudi Arabia			
Sudanese Armed Forces			
Syrian Armed Forces			
Tunisian Armed Forces			
Variant		فريق بالبحرية; Fariq bialbahria	
French	Général de division	Vice-amiral	Général de division
United Arab Emirates Armed Forces			
Republic of Yemen Armed Forces			

== See also ==
- Military ranks of the Ottoman Empire
- Comparative army officer ranks of Arabophone countries
- Comparative navy officer ranks of Arabophone countries
- Comparative air force officer ranks of Arabophone countries
