= Muqaddam =

Rank in Islamic cultures

Muqaddam (Arabic: مقدم) is an Arabic title, adopted in other Islamic or Islamicate cultures, for various civil or religious officials.

According to the Persian records of medieval India, muqaddams, along with khots and chowdhurys, acted as hereditary rural intermediaries between the state and the peasantry. Originating during the Delhi Sultanate, the earliest known reference to the muqaddami system dates from the first decades of the 13th century, when Hasan Nizami wrote of a delegation of muqaddams offering gifts to Sultan Qutb ud-Din Aibak. Muqaddams were tasked with revenue collection in the areas under their jurisdiction, for which they received either 2.5% as remuneration or rent-free land equivalent to that amount. The socio-economic status of muqaddams varied over time; during the revenue reforms of Alauddin Khalji, many became impoverished due to the abolition of their traditional privileges. However, in other periods the muqaddams "were prosperous enough to ride on costly Arabi and Iraqi horses, wear fine clothes, and behave like members of the upper classes". Over time, muqaddams and chowdhurys took on the characteristics of landed gentry in their respective localities, with some even attaining the status of Zamindars during the Mughal period. Muqaddams could be dispossessed of their status by the state.

In the Tijaniyyah, Shadhiliyyah, Rahmaniyyah, and other Sufi orders, a muqaddam is a student of the Sufi path (a murid or dervish) who has been authorized by his/her Guide (aka shaikh, pir, or murshid) to assist in teaching the path to other students.

In Lebanon, the muqaddams were the political leaders of their religious community. The last muqaddams disappeared at the beginning of the 17th century.

== Military use ==
In the militaries of several Arab nations, muqaddam is equivalent to the Anglophone ranks of lieutenant colonel, commander and wing commander, depending on the service branch.

	Army	Navy	Air Force
Algerian People's National Armed Forces			
French	Lieutenant colonel		
Bahrain Defence Force			
Egyptian Armed Forces			
Iraqi Armed Forces			
Jordanian Armed Forces			
Kuwait Military Forces			
Lebanese Armed Forces			
Libyan Armed Forces			
Armed Forces of Mauritania			
Variant		مقدم بحري; Muqaddam baḥriun	
Sultan of Oman's Armed Forces			
Palestinian National Security Forces		—N/a	—N/a
Qatar Armed Forces			
Armed Forces of Saudi Arabia			
Sudanese Armed Forces			
Syrian Armed Forces			
Tunisian Armed Forces			
Variant		مقدم بالبحرية; Muqaddam bialbaḥria	
French	Lieutenant colonel	Capitaine de frégate	Lieutenant colonel
United Arab Emirates Armed Forces			
Republic of Yemen Armed Forces			
