= Birindji ferik =

Military rank in the Ottoman Army

Birindji ferik, birinci ferîk or ferîk-i evvel (corresponding to the earlier Ottoman rank of Serdar) was a military rank of the Ottoman Army. The title means "First Ferîk" and was senior to a Ferîk and junior only to the Müşîr (equivalent to Field Marshal).

The collar mark (later shoulder mark) and cap (until 1933) of a Birinci Ferîk had three stripes and three stars during the early years of the Turkish Republic.

The rank of birinci ferîk was abolished on November 26, 1934, in accordance with Article 3 of Law No. 2590 on the Abolition of Nicknames and Titles. With Decree No. 2295, issued on April 9, 1935, the equivalent of the birinci ferîk rank was designated as orgeneral for Army birinci ferîks and oramiral for Navy birinci ferîks.

== See also ==
- Comparative military ranks of World War I
