= Mirliva =

Military rank of the Ottoman Army and Navy

Mirliva or Mîr-i livâ was a military rank of the Ottoman Army and Navy. It corresponds to brigadier general (modern Turkish: Tuğgeneral) and division general (modern Turkish: Tümgeneral) in the modern Turkish Army. Mirliva is a compound word composed of Mir (commander) and Liva (or Liwa, "brigade" in Arabic). The rank was junior to the Ferîk (Major General) and superior to the rank Miralay (Colonel) in the Ottoman Army and the pre-1935 Turkish Army.

Mirliva was the most junior general rank with the title Pasha.

The collar mark (later shoulder mark) and cap (until 1933) of a Mirliva had three stripes and one star during the early years of the Turkish Republic.

The rank of mirliva was abolished on November 26, 1934, in accordance with Article 3 of Law No. 2590 on the Abolition of Nicknames and Titles. With Decree No. 2295, issued on April 9, 1935, the equivalent of the mirliva rank was designated as tuğgeneral for Army mirlivas and tuğamiral for Navy mirlivas, but those serving as division commanders at the time were promoted to the rank of tümgeneral or tümamiral.

== See also ==
- Comparative military ranks of World War I
- Sanjak-bey
