= Mushir =

Highest rank in most militaries of the Middle East

Mushir (Arabic: مشير) is an Arabic word meaning "counsellor" or "advisor". It is related to the word shura, meaning consultation or "taking counsel".

As an official title, it historically referred to a personal advisor to the ruler. In this use, it is roughly comparable to the European titles of State Counsellor and Counsellor of State.

In a military context, mushir became associated with the idea of the ruler's personal counsellor or advisor on military matters, and as such became the highest rank in Arab countries and the Ottoman Empire. It is used as the highest rank in most armed forces of the Middle East and North Africa, for armies, navies, and air forces. It is therefore equivalent to the ranks of Field Marshal and Admiral of the Fleet.

== Iraq ==
In Iraq under the rule of Saddam Hussein, the Iraqi Navy maintained a fleet admiral rank known as Mushir. A Mushir was the most senior of all naval officers and the rank was rarely bestowed. The sleeve insignia was the same as a British Admiral of the Fleet.

The rank of Mushir in Iraq is known as "Muhib" and is used in all official and unofficial addresses. Saddam Hussein as commander-in-chief of the Iraqi Armed Forces was an honorary "staff muhib" (مهيب ركن) in the Iraqi army, and the uniform which he typically wore was that of a staff muhib. He was the only muhib in the Iraqi Army, for the minister of defence and the chief of staff held the rank of Fariq awal rukun (فريق اول ركن), or "staff general". (Saddam Hussein never actually served in the Iraqi Army but commanded as ruler of Iraq,and had control full over the Iraqi army .) After Hussein's fall in the 2003 invasion of Iraq, the rank of mushir was kept by Izzat Ibrahim al-Douri in the mid 2000s , when the government completely changed by the year 2008 the rank of Mushir became obsolete in the new Iraqi military.

== Saudi Arabia ==
In Saudi Arabia, the rank of Mushir is typically held ceremonially by the House of Saud, and translated as "First class Field Marshal".

== List of Egyptian field marshals ==
=== Kingdom of Egypt ===
- Abbas I Hilmi Pasha (1813–1854)
- Ibrahim Pasha (1789–1848)
- Yahya Mansur Yeghen (1837–1913)
- Horatio Herbert Kitchener (1850–1916)
- 20 December 1914 – Sultan Hussein Kamel (1853–1917)
- King Fuad I (1868–1936)
- 'Aziz 'Ali al-Misri (1879–1965)
- King Farouk (1920–1965)
- 26 July 1952 – King Fuad II (born 1952)

=== Republic of Egypt ===
- Abdel Hakim Amer (1952–1967): Active duty
- November 1973 – Ahmad Ismail Ali (1917–1974): Active duty
- Abdel Ghani Elgamasy (1921–2003): Active duty
- Fouad Mohamed Abou Zikry (1923–1983): Honorary
- Mohammed Aly Fahmy (1920–1999): Honorary
- Ahmed Badawi (1927–1981): Posthumously
- 1982 – Abd al-Halim Abu Ghazala (1930–2008): Active duty
- 1993 – Mohamed Hussein Tantawi (1935–2021): Active duty
- 27 January 2014 – Abdel Fattah el-Sisi (born 1954): Active duty

== Rank insignia ==
	Army	Navy	Air Force
Bahrain Defence Force			
Egyptian Armed Forces			
Iraqi Armed Forces			
Jordanian Armed Forces			
Libyan Armed Forces			
Sultan of Oman's Armed Forces			
Royal Armed Forces of Saudi Arabia			
Sudanese Armed Forces			
Republic of Yemen Armed Forces			

=== Historic ===
Royal Egyptian Army

Ottoman Army

== See also ==
- List of field marshals of the Ottoman Empire
