= Comparative army officer ranks of Africa =

Rank comparison chart of officer ranks for armies/land forces of African states.

== Officers ==
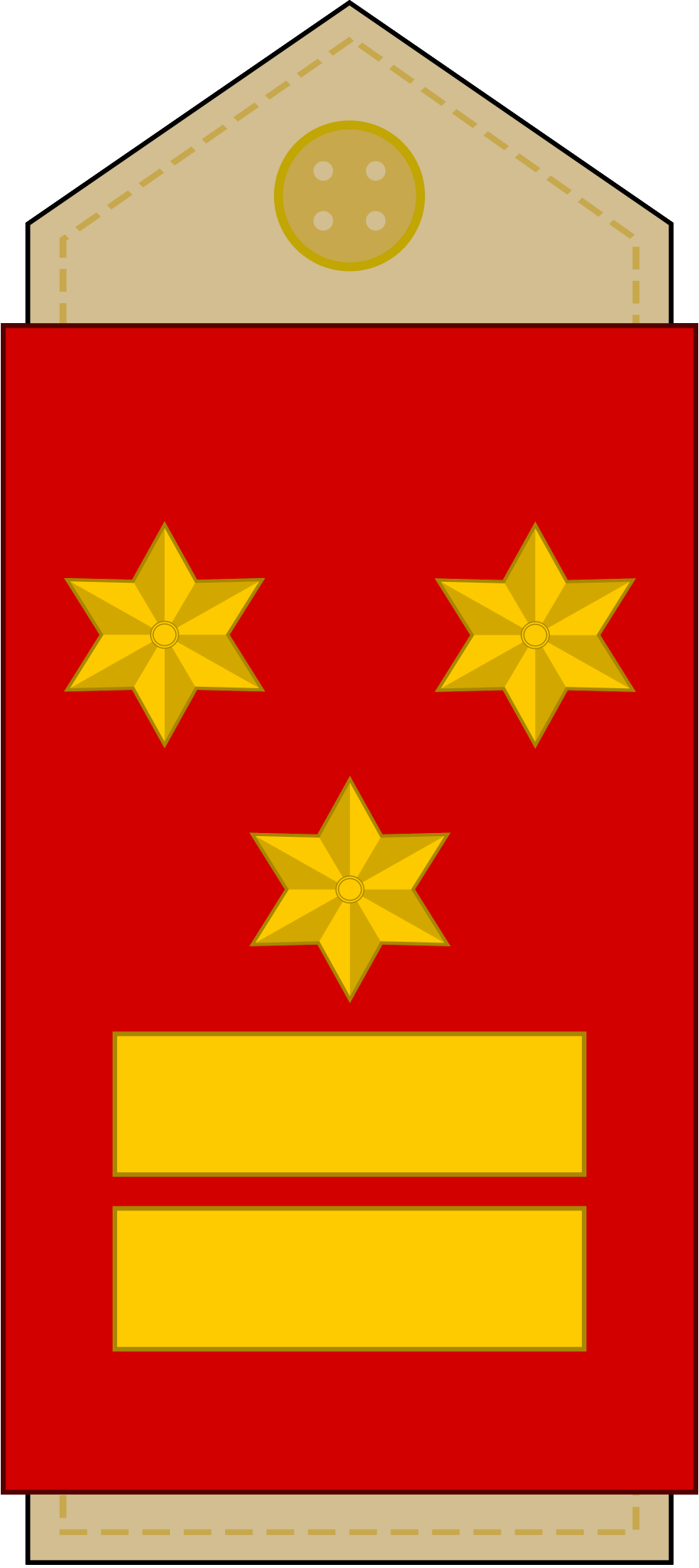
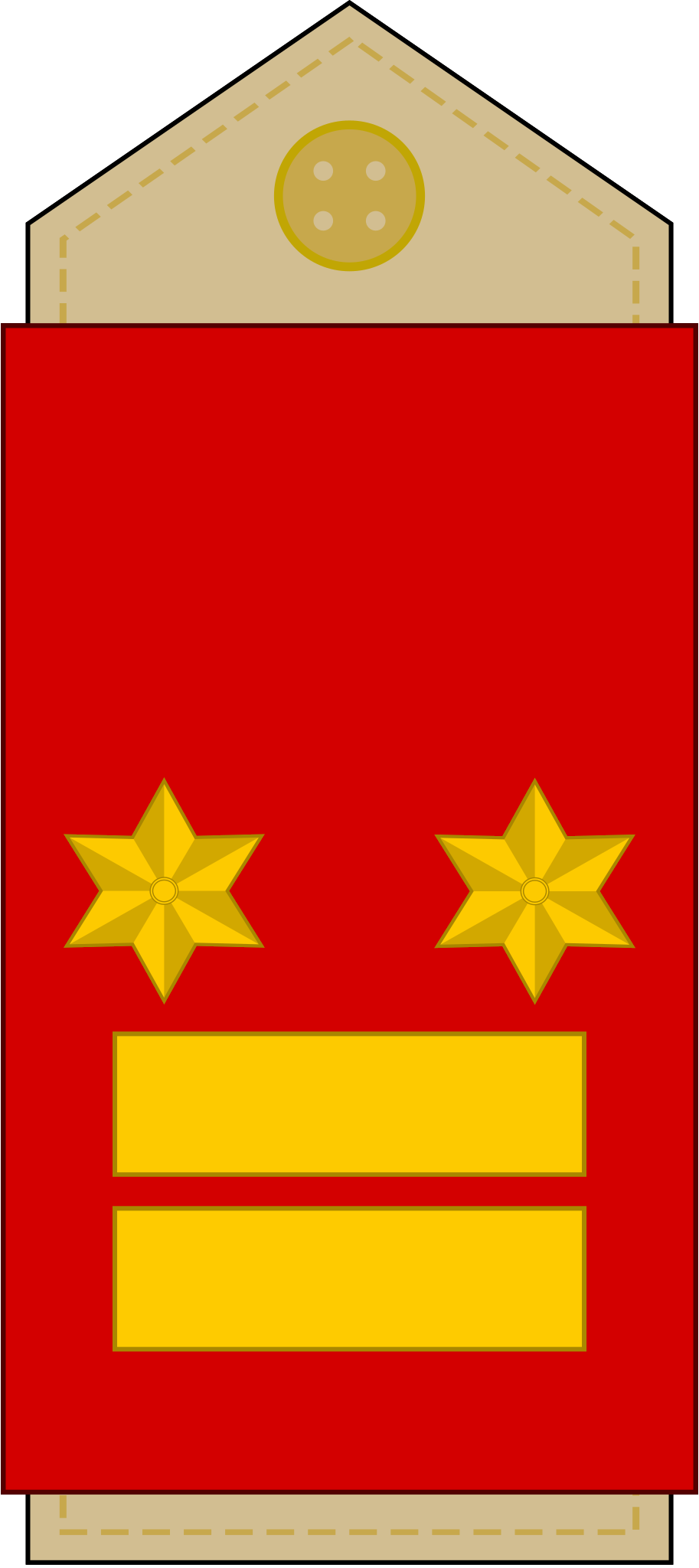
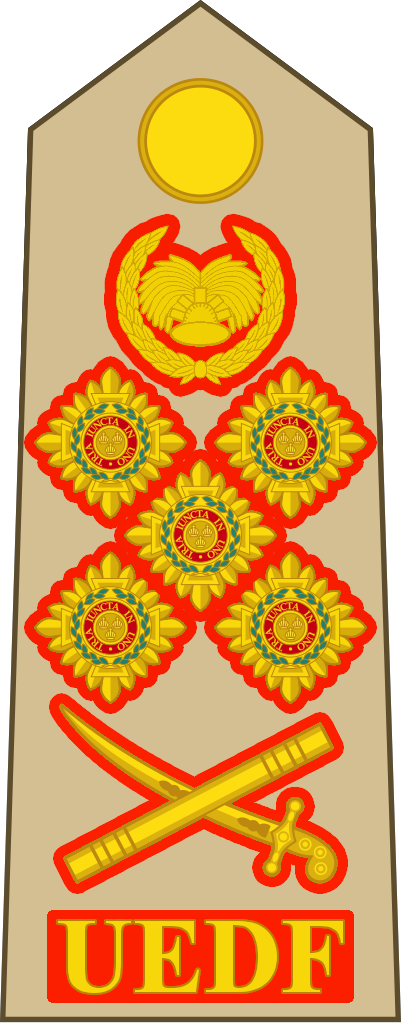
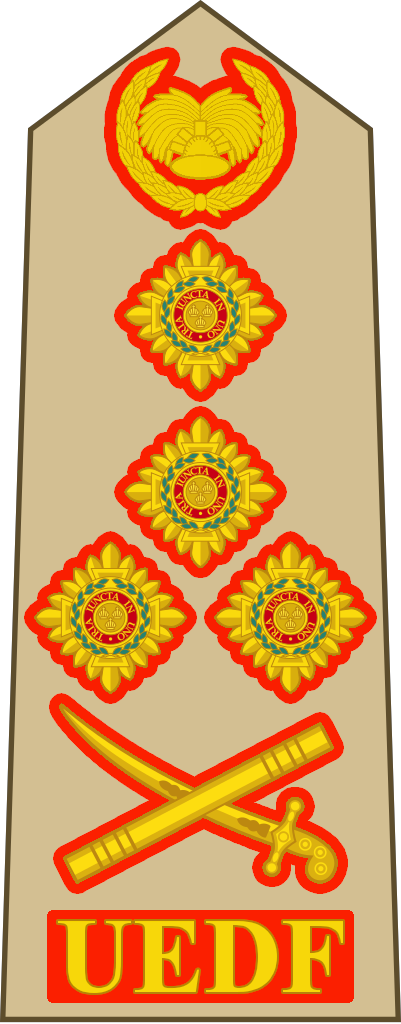
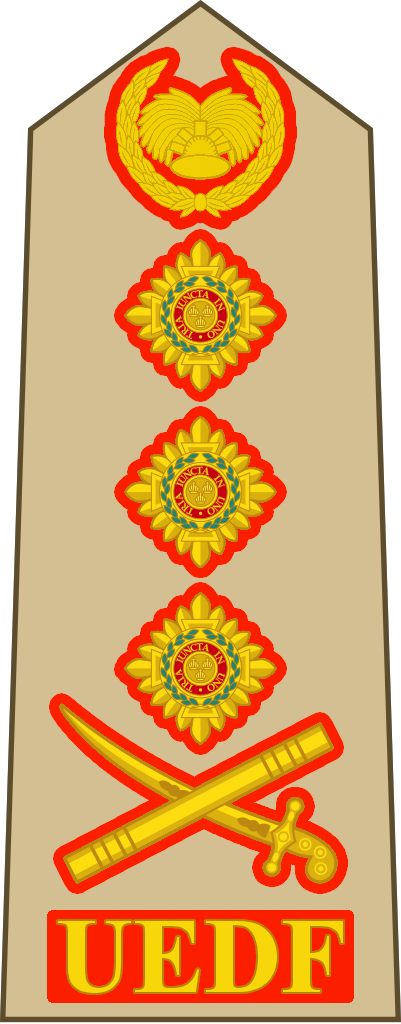
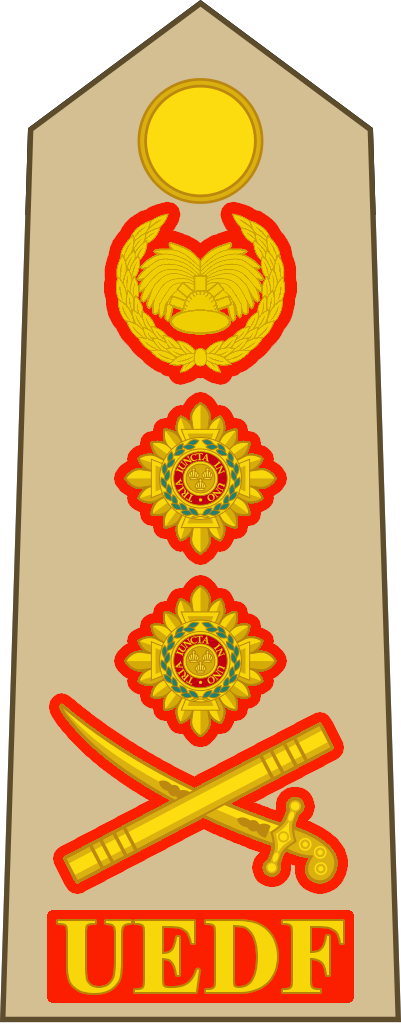
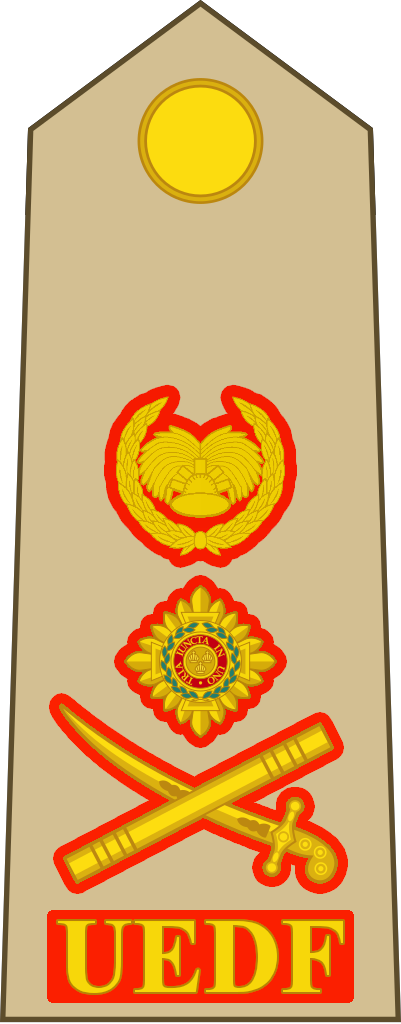
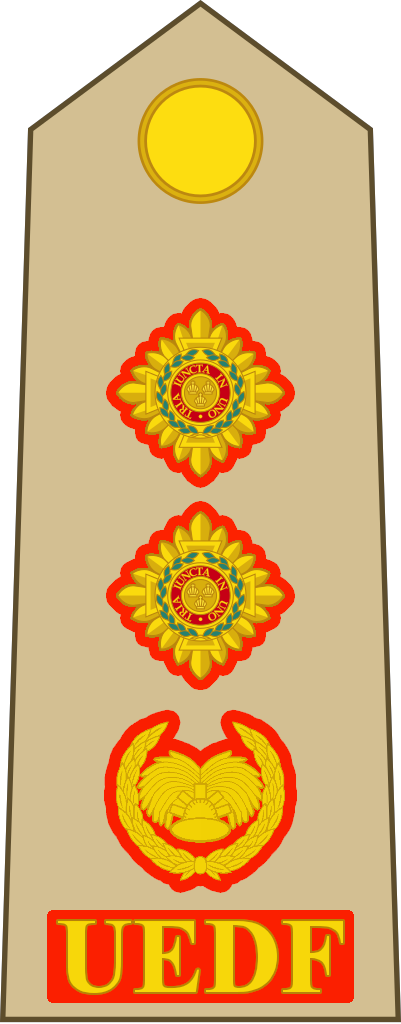
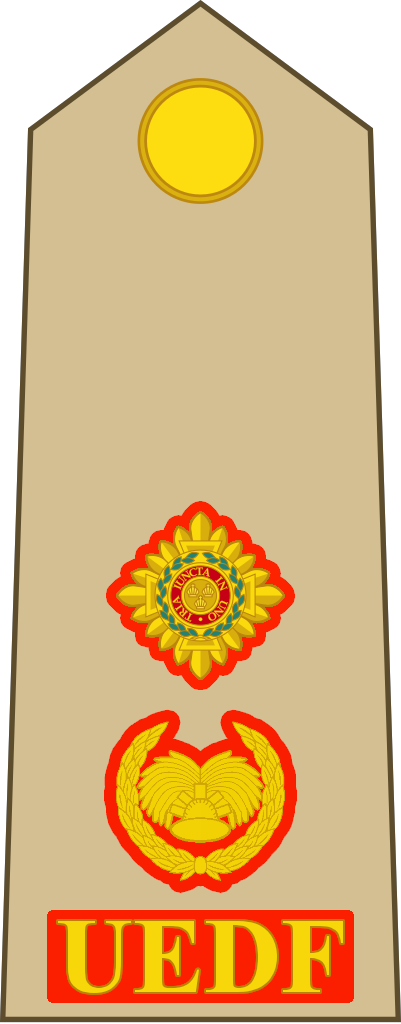
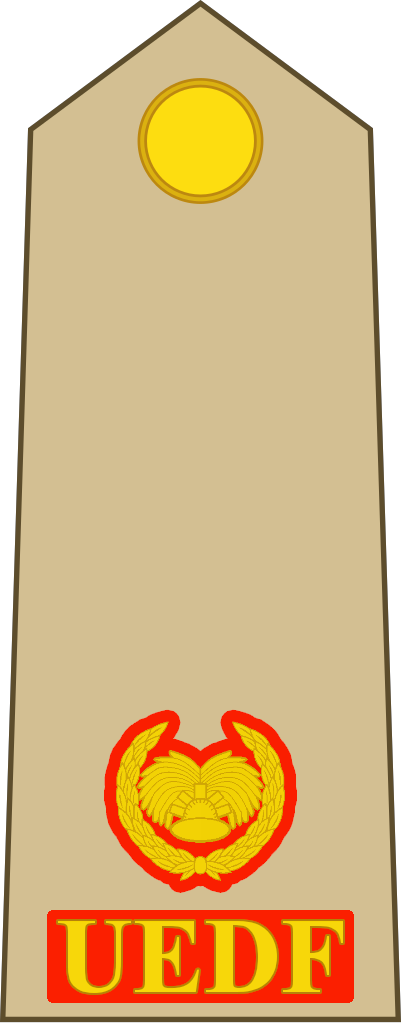
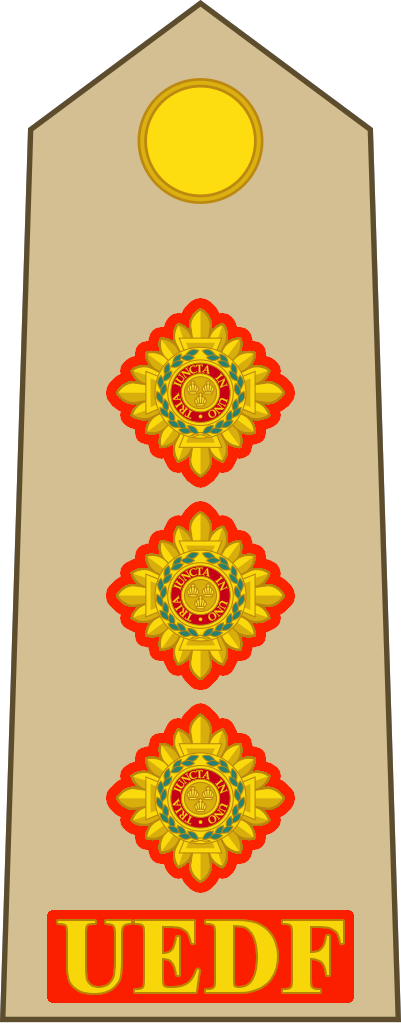
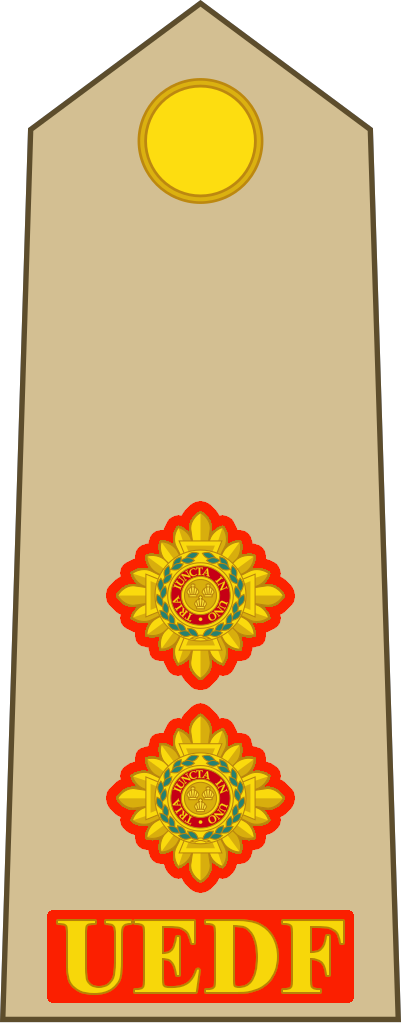
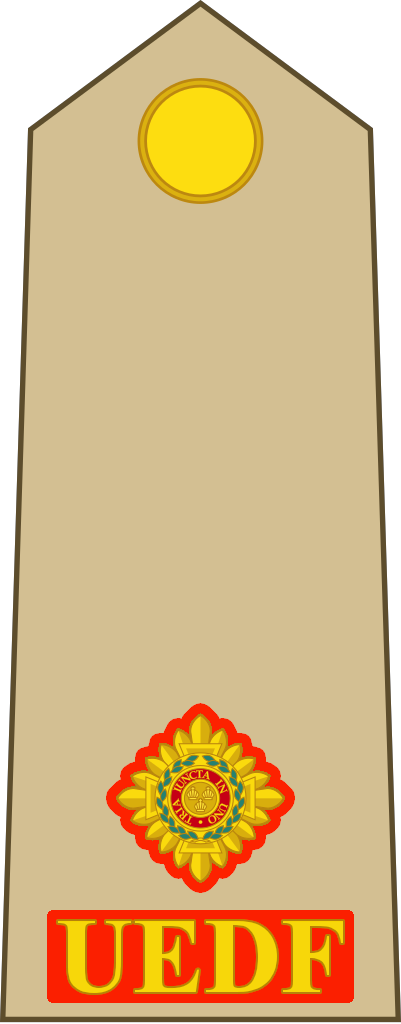
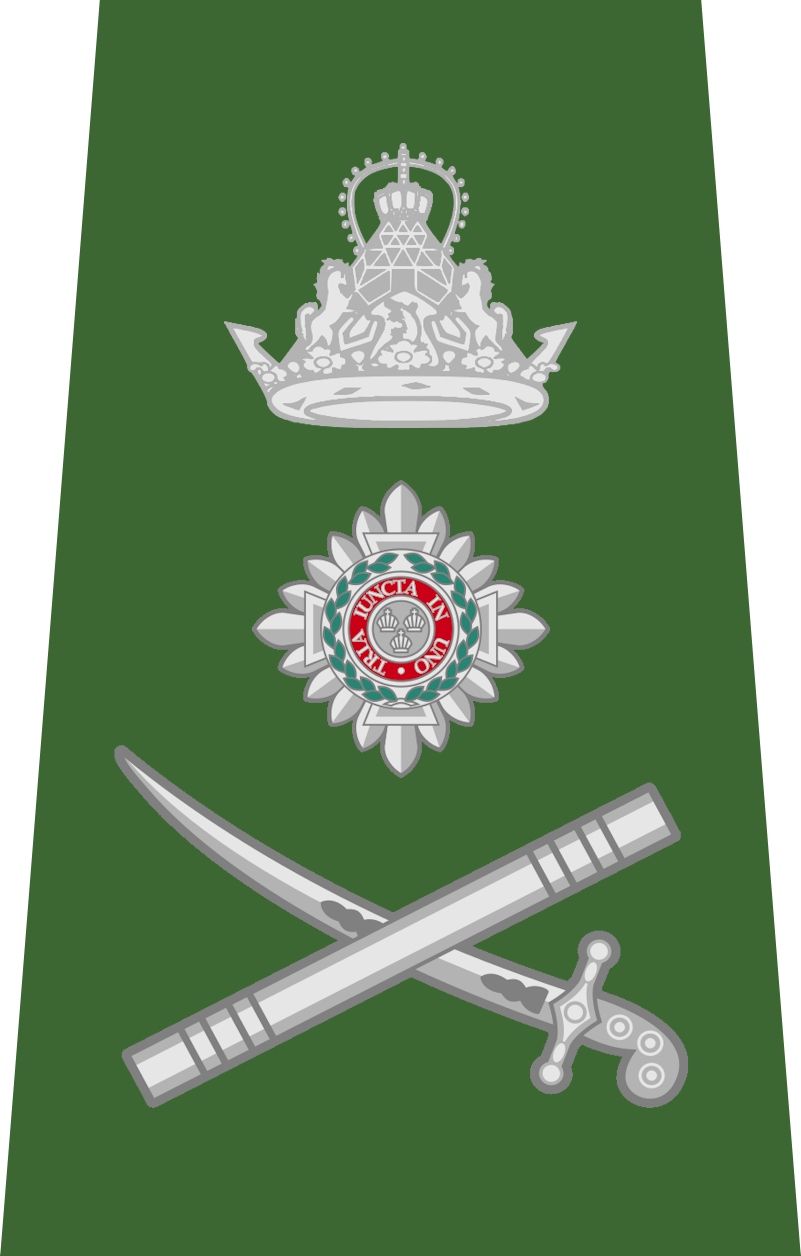
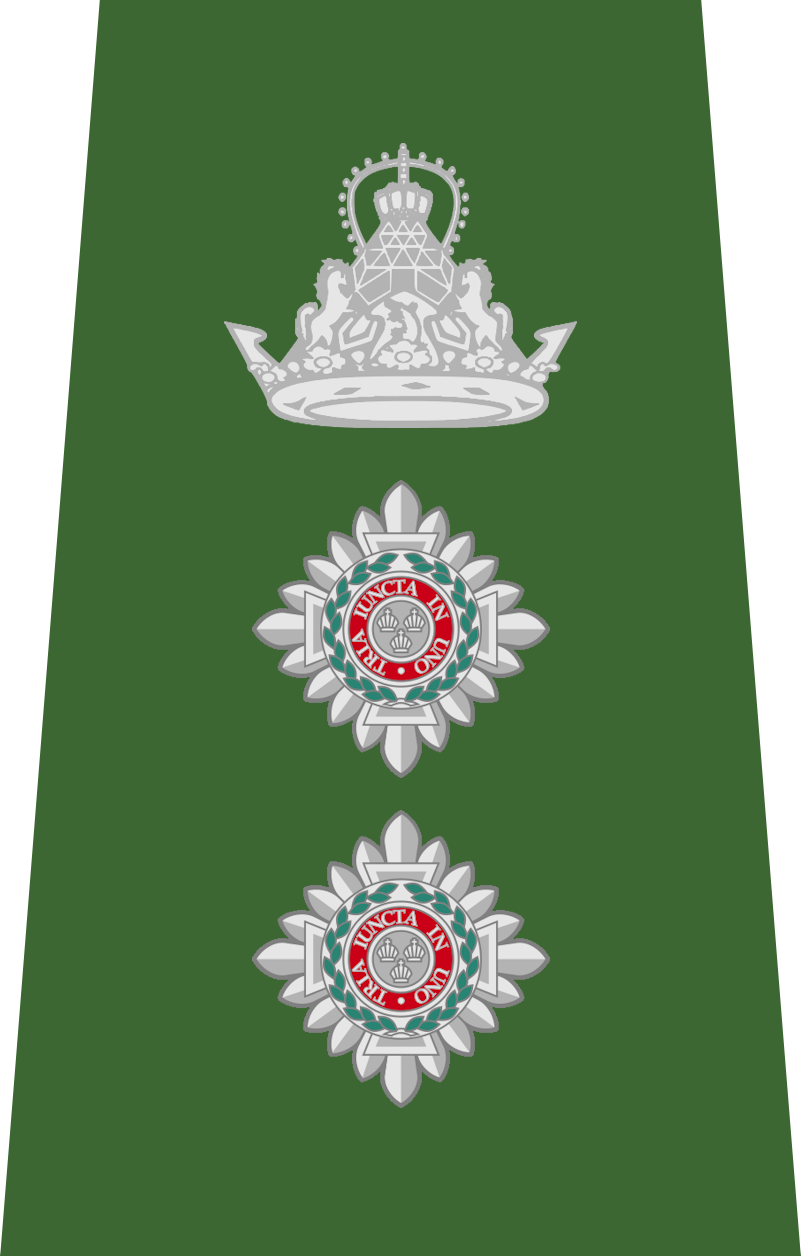
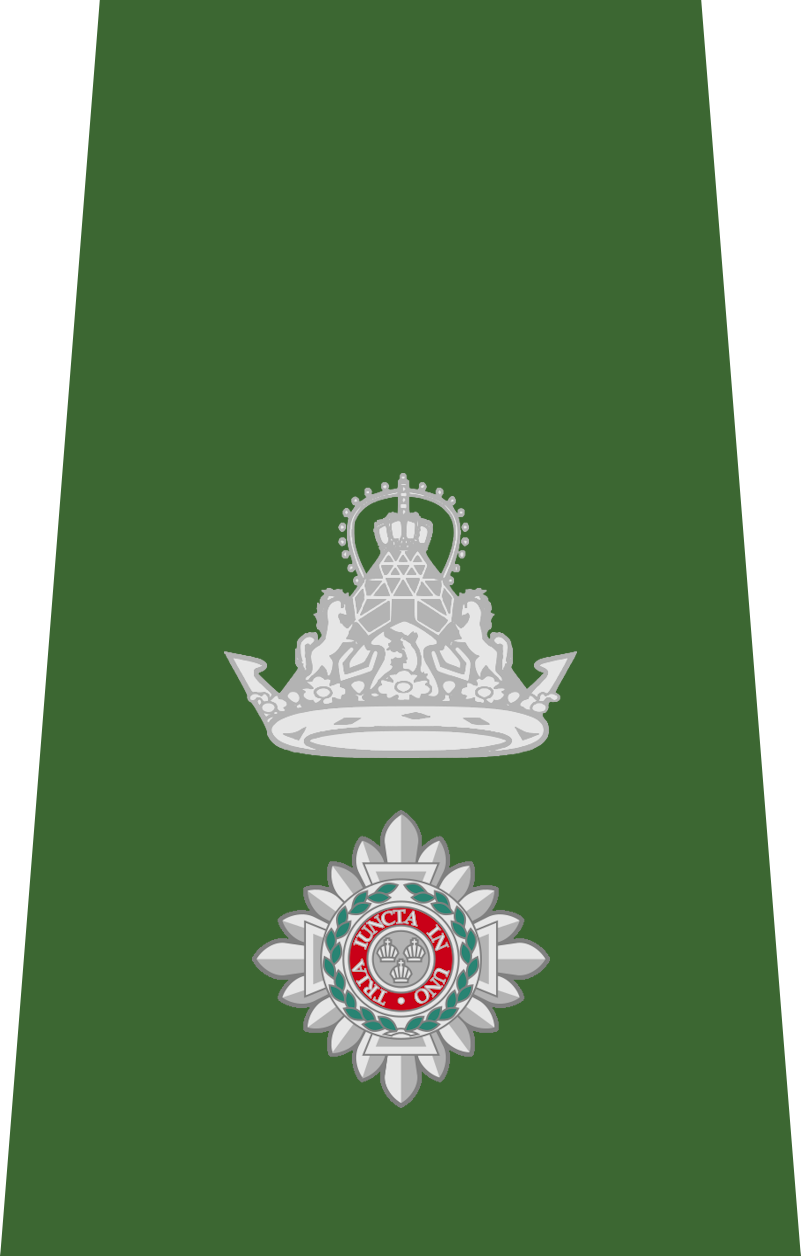
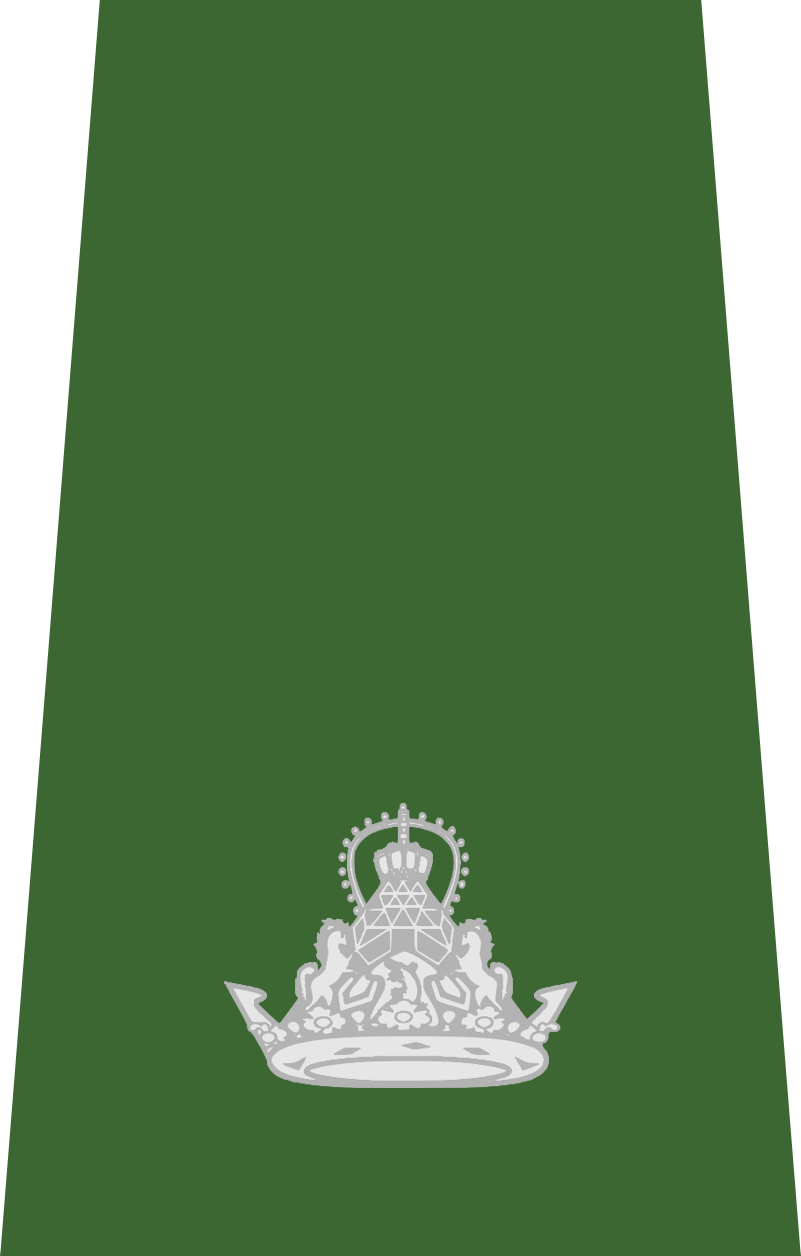
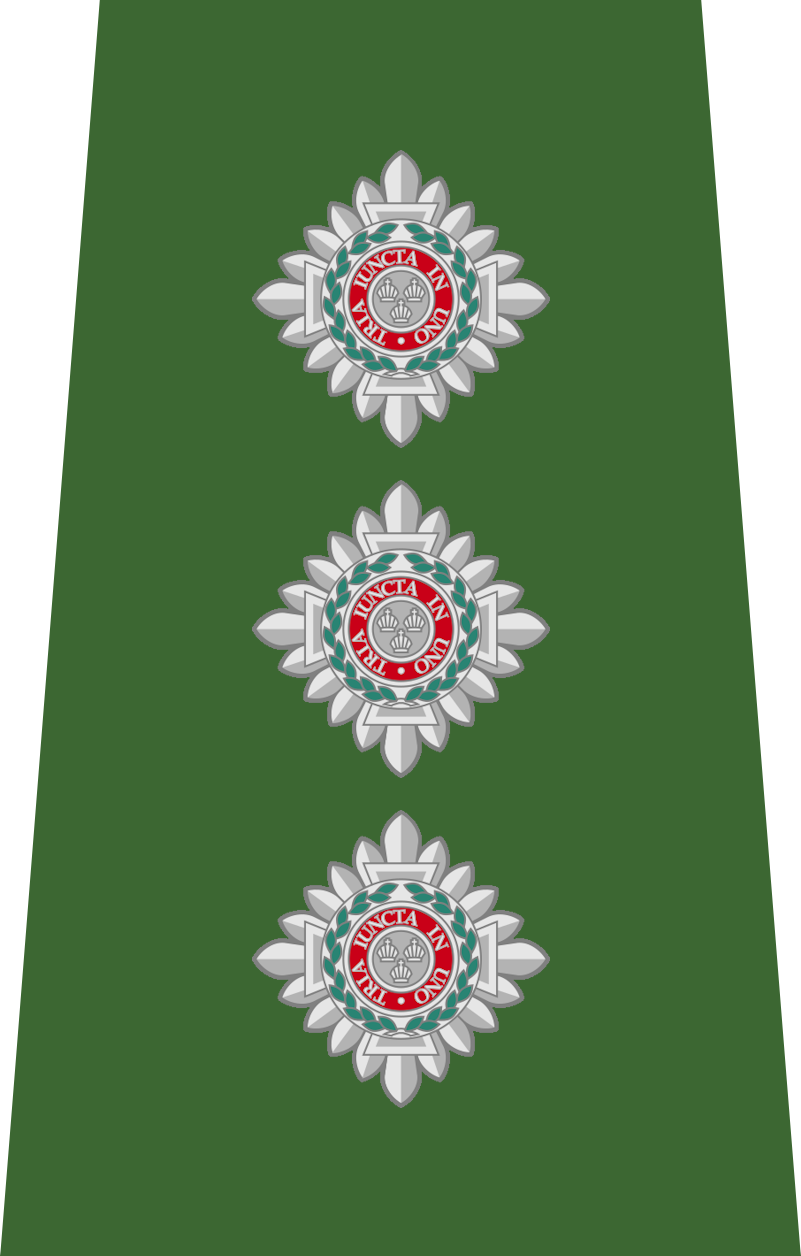
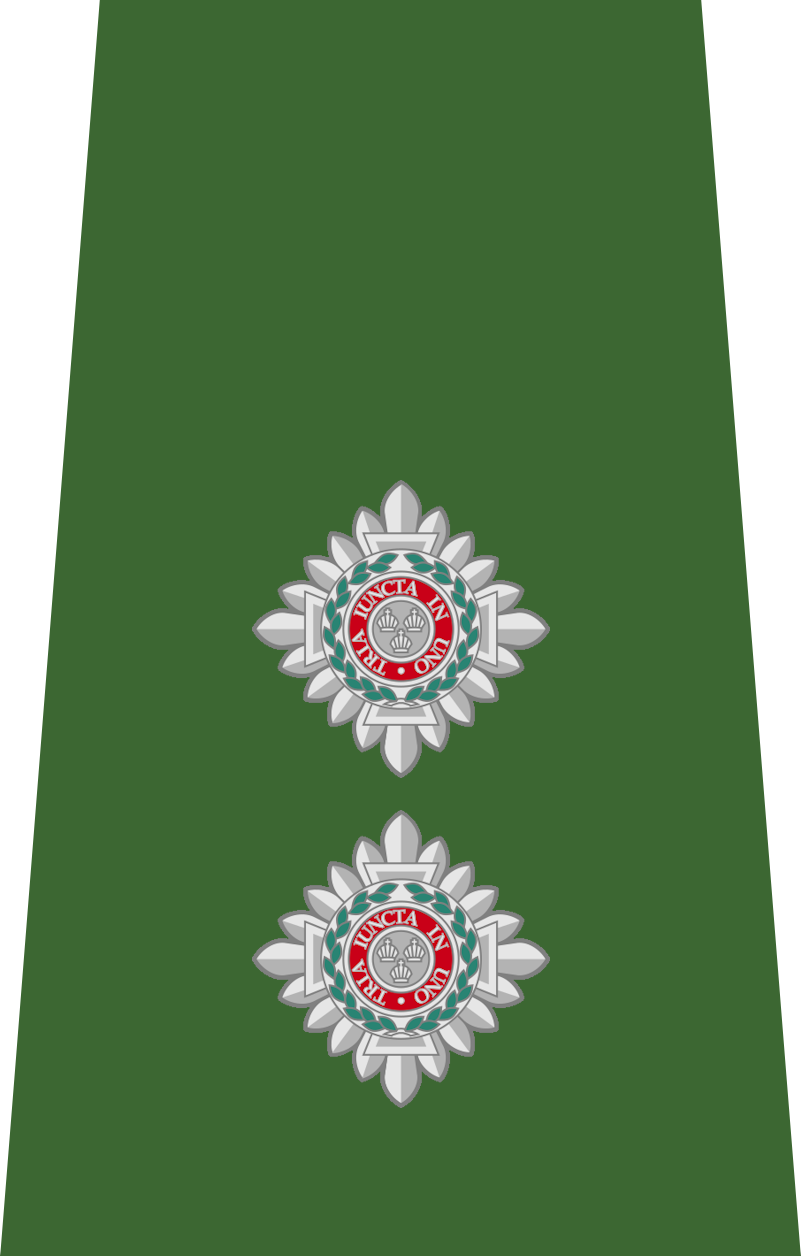
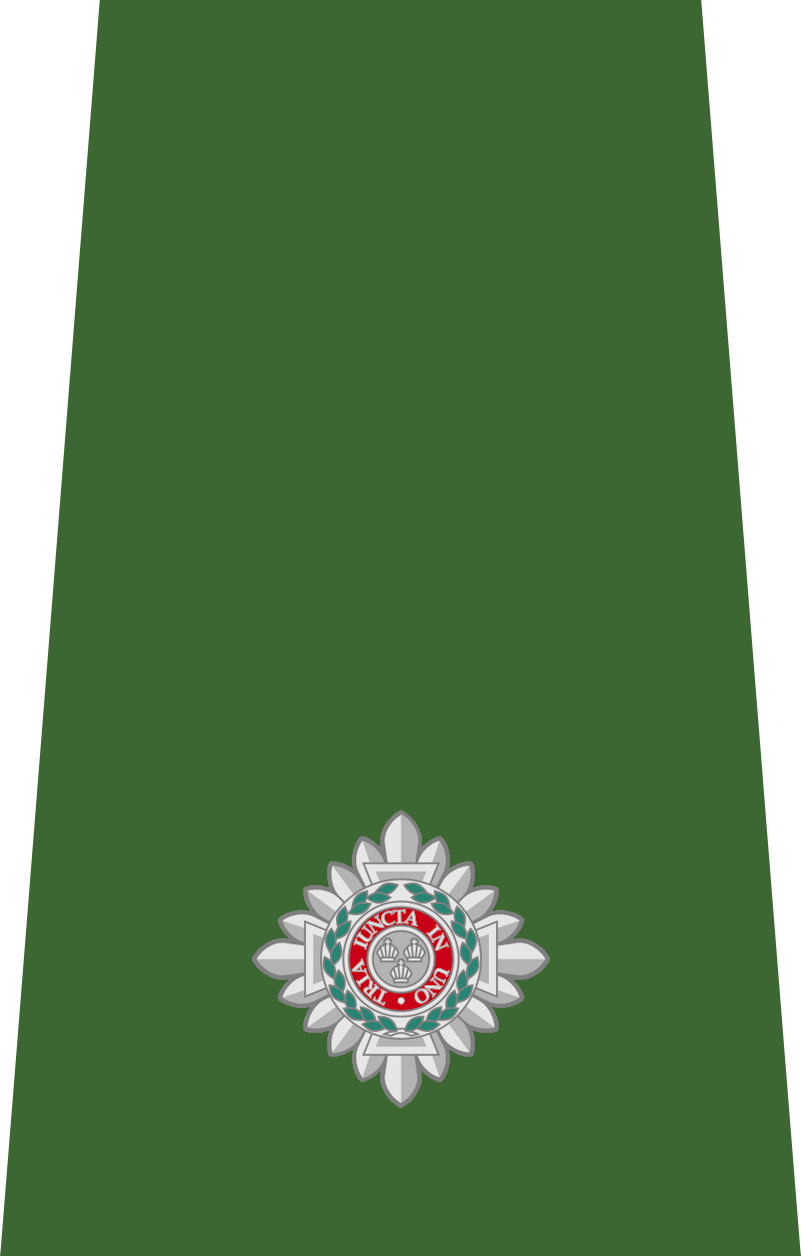
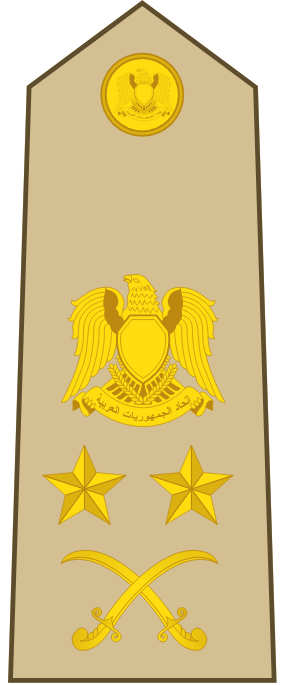
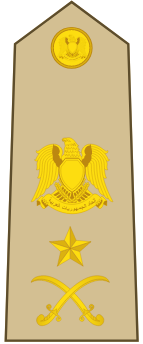
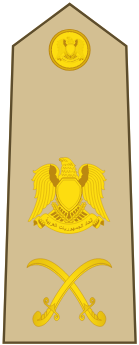
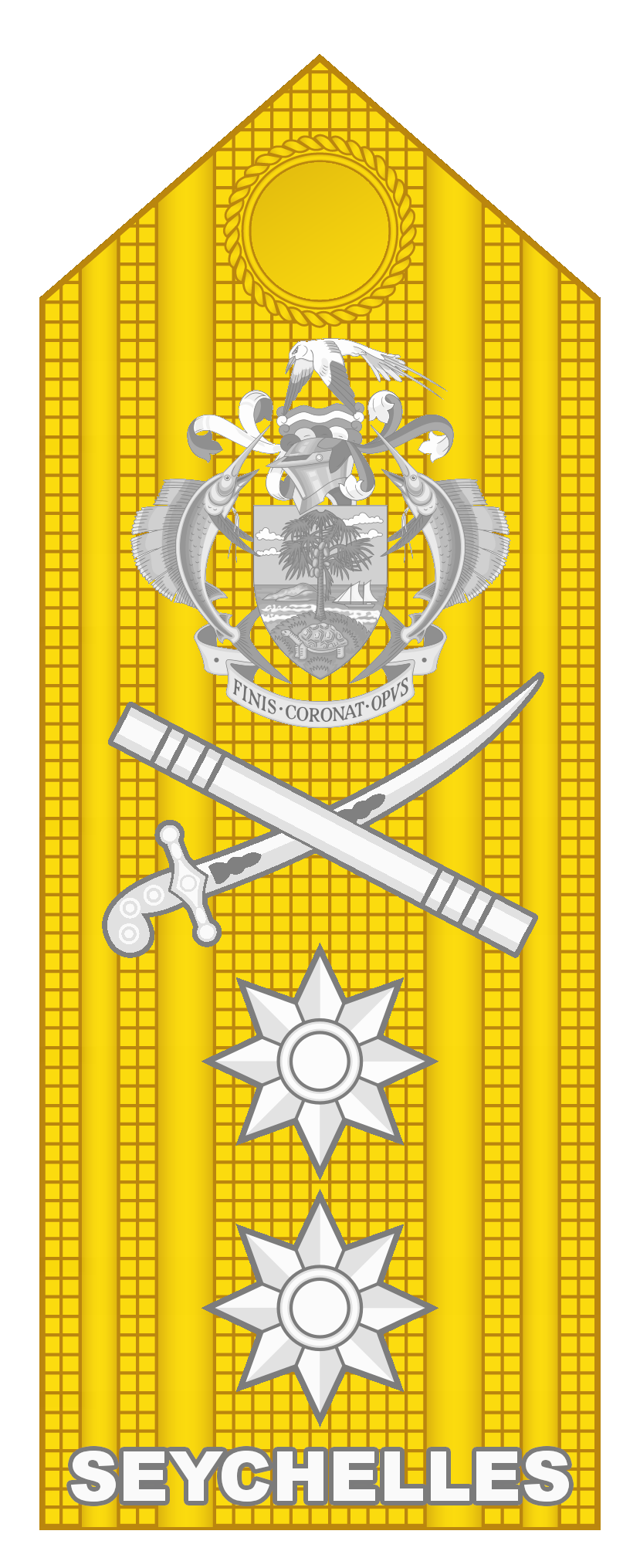
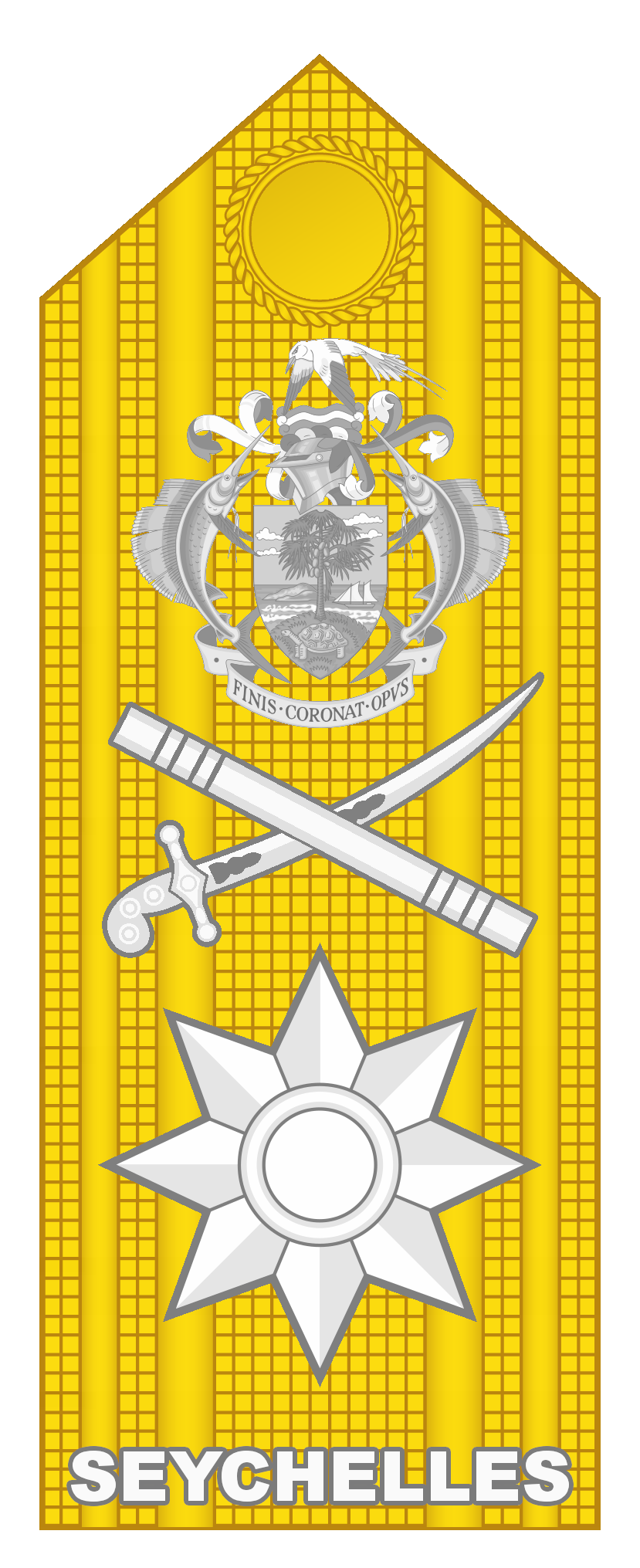
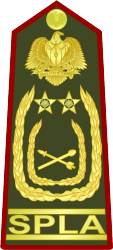
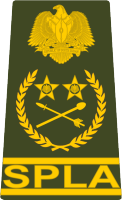
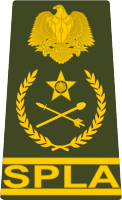
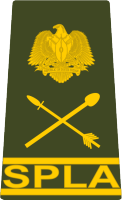
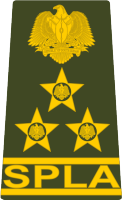
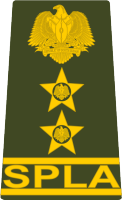
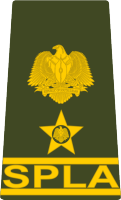
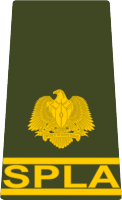
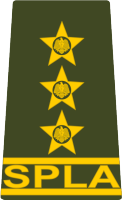
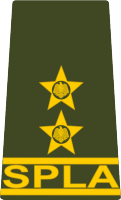
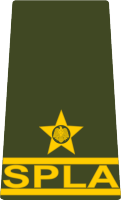
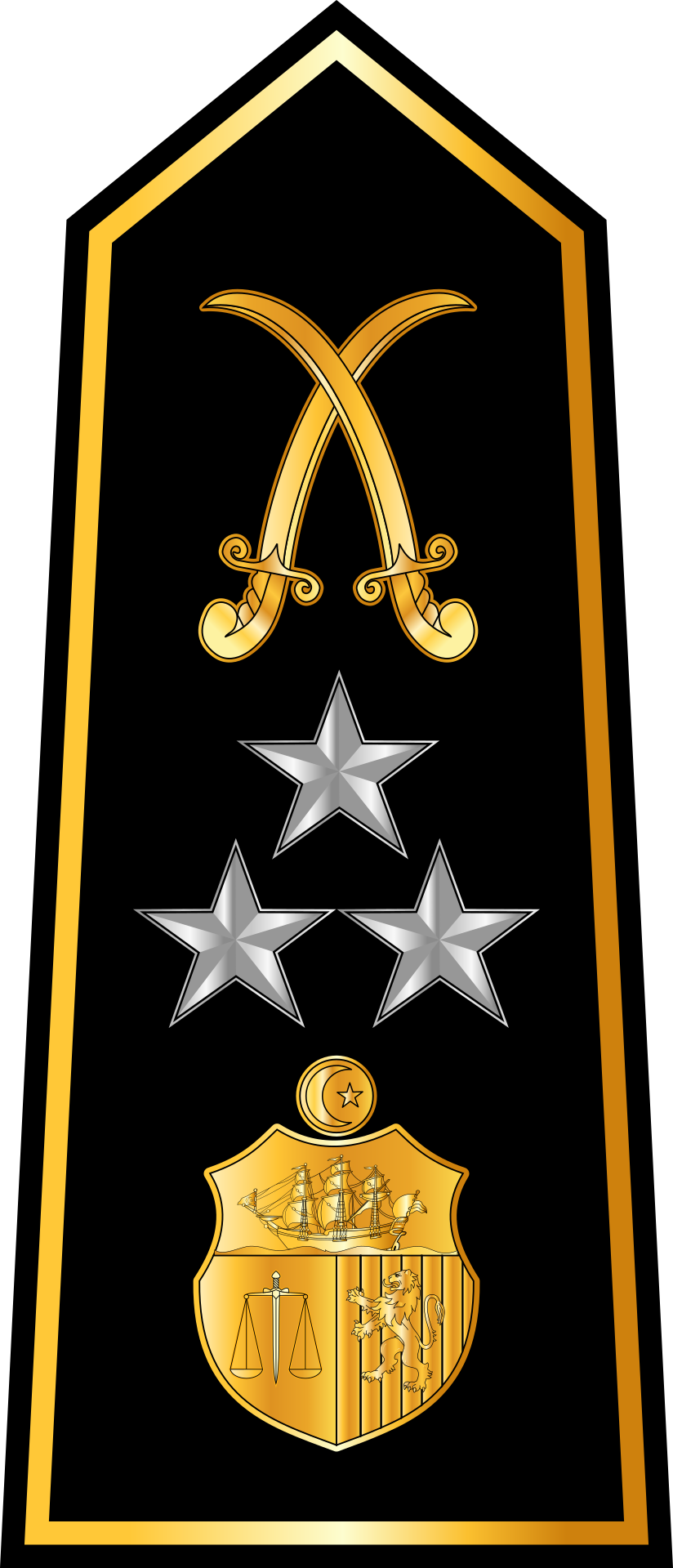
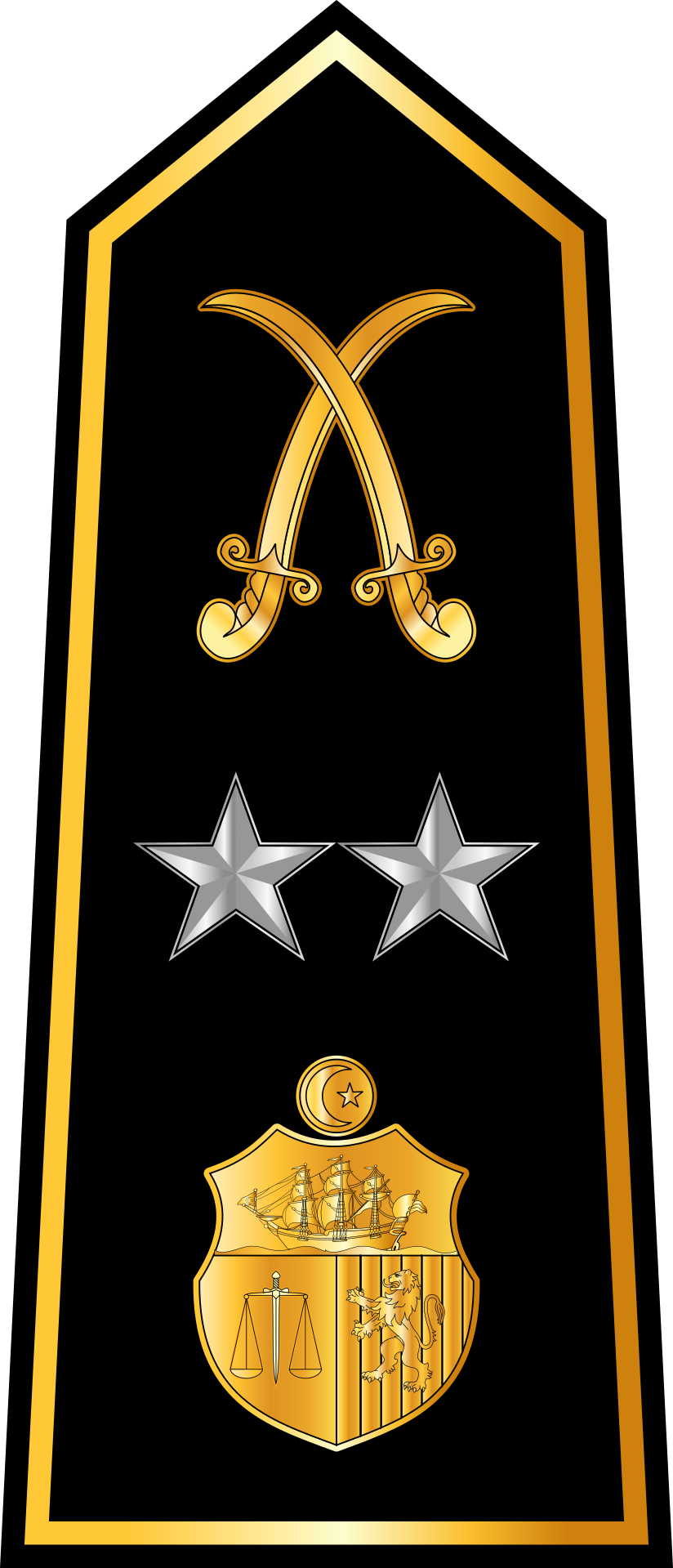
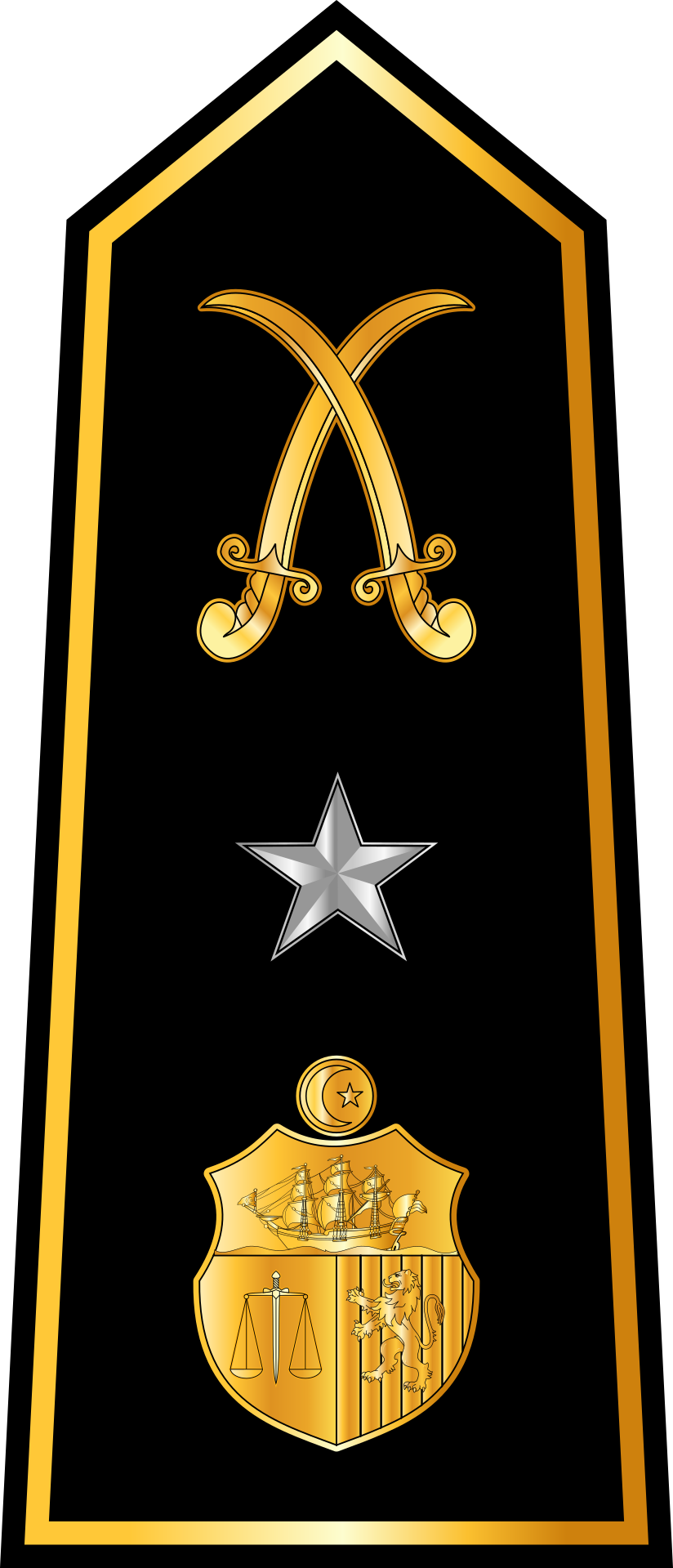
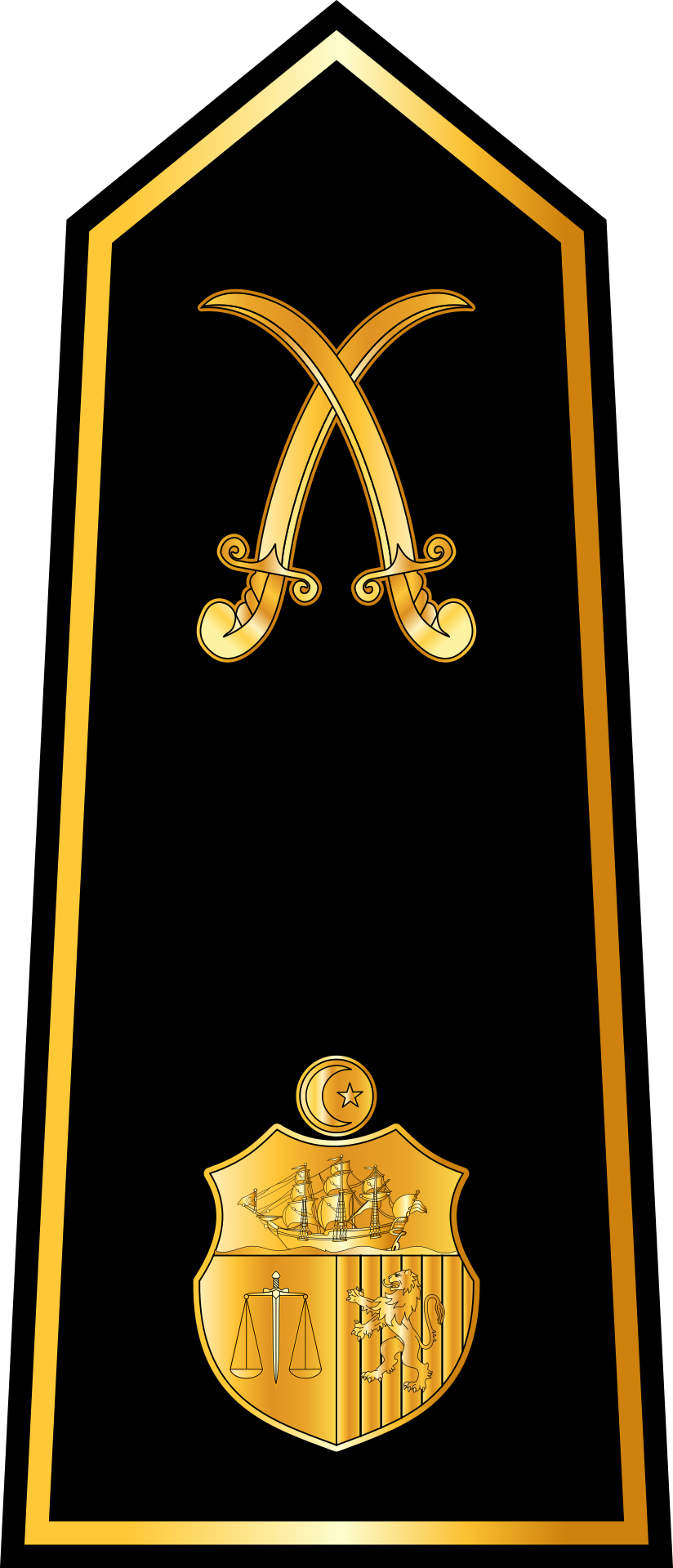
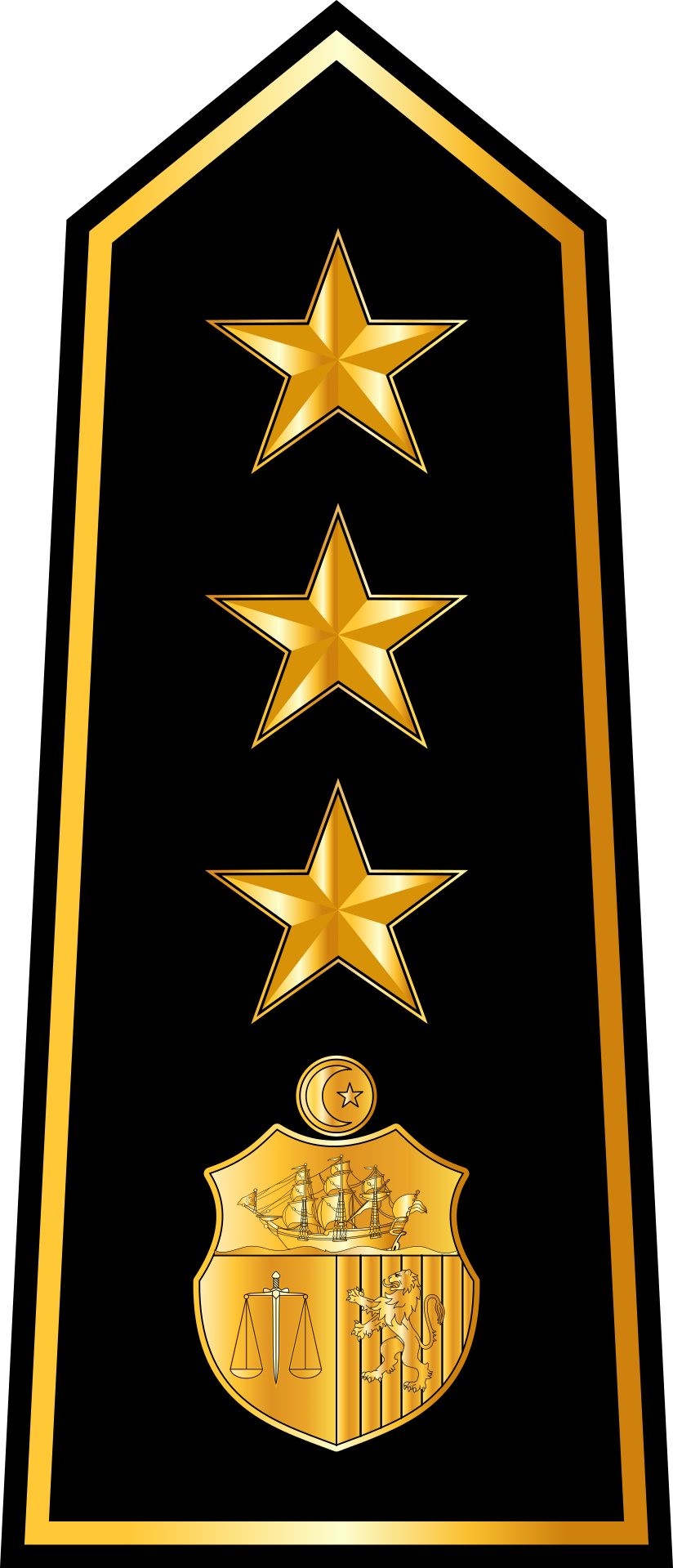
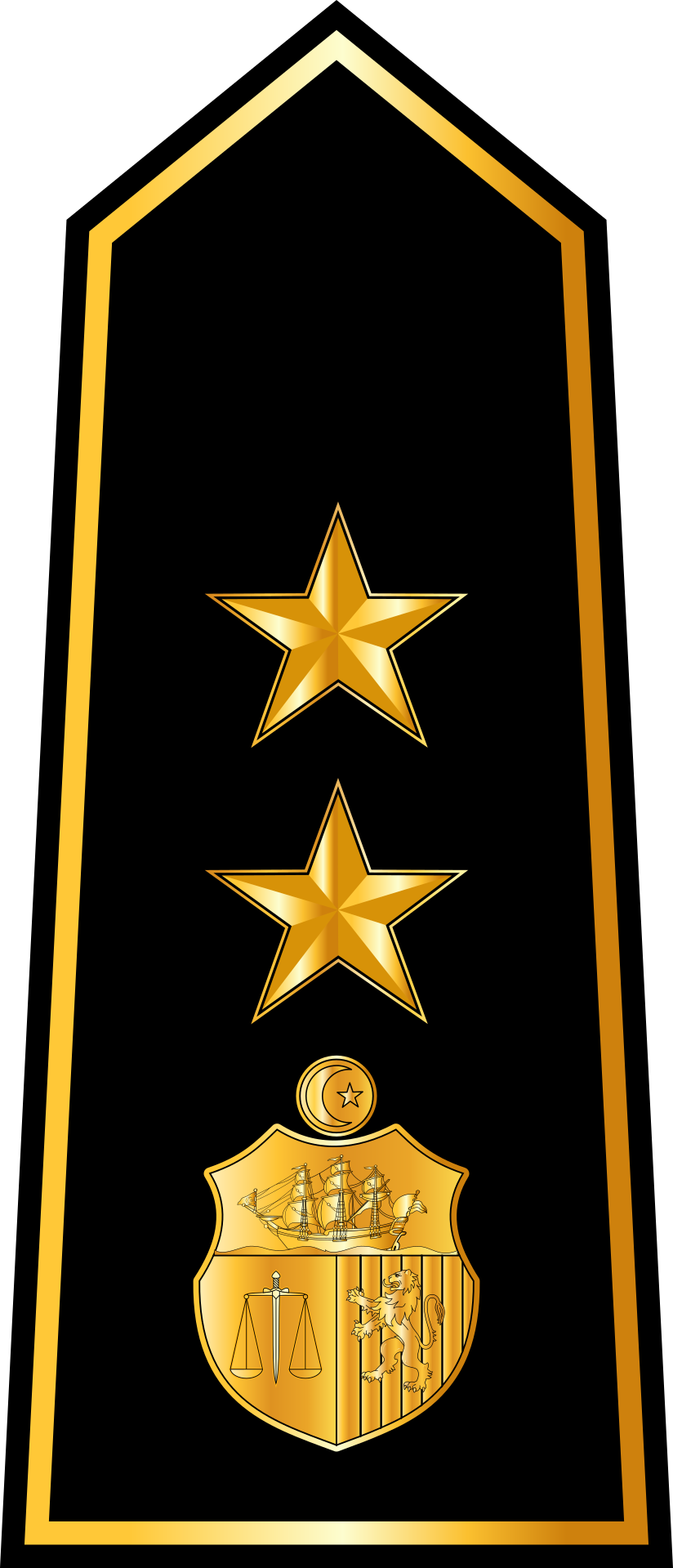
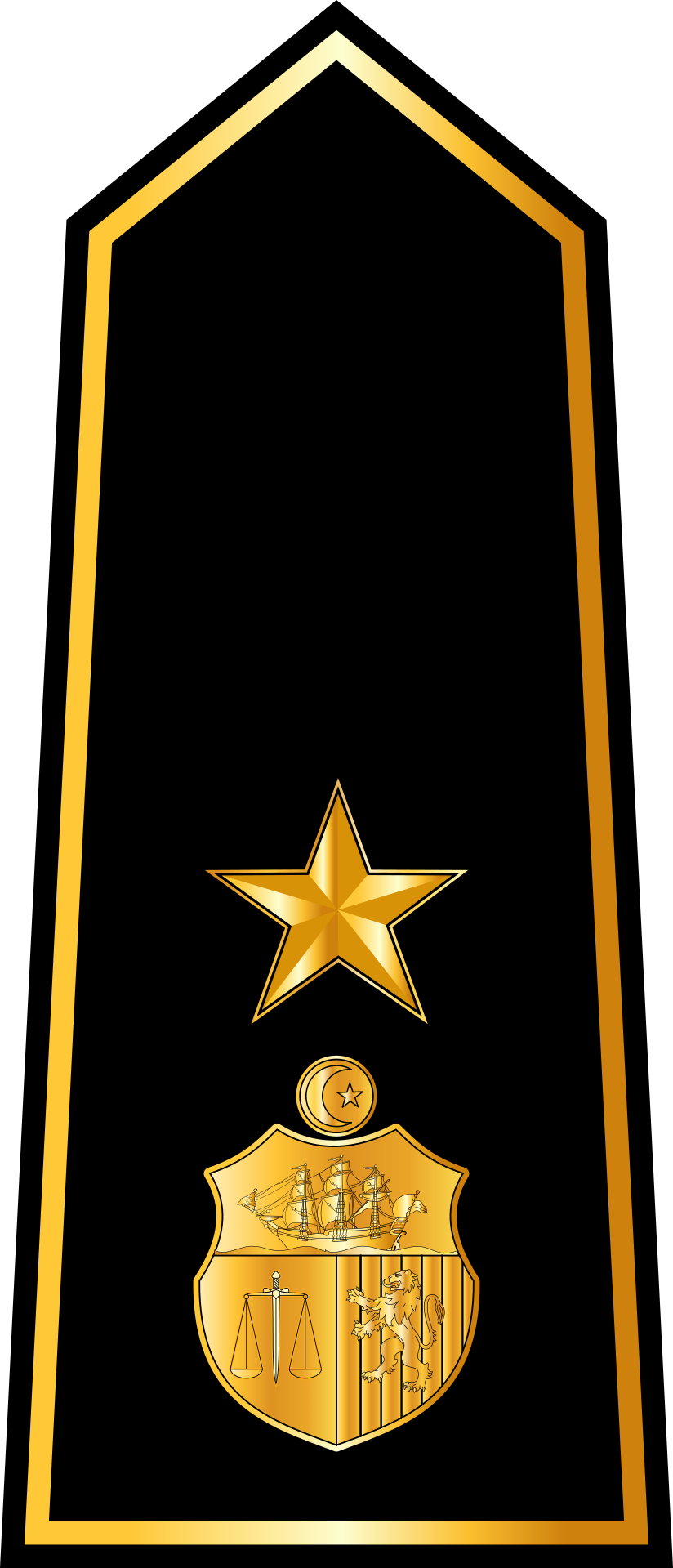
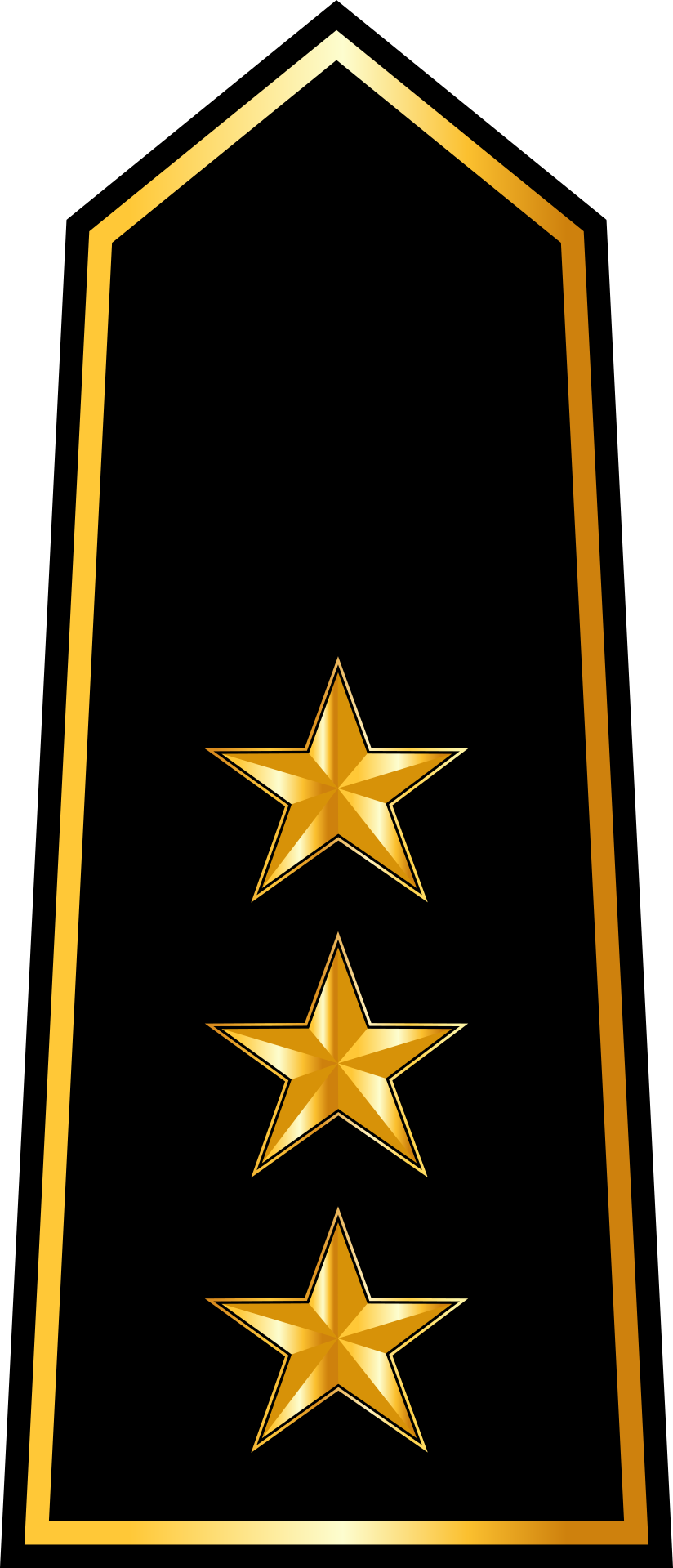
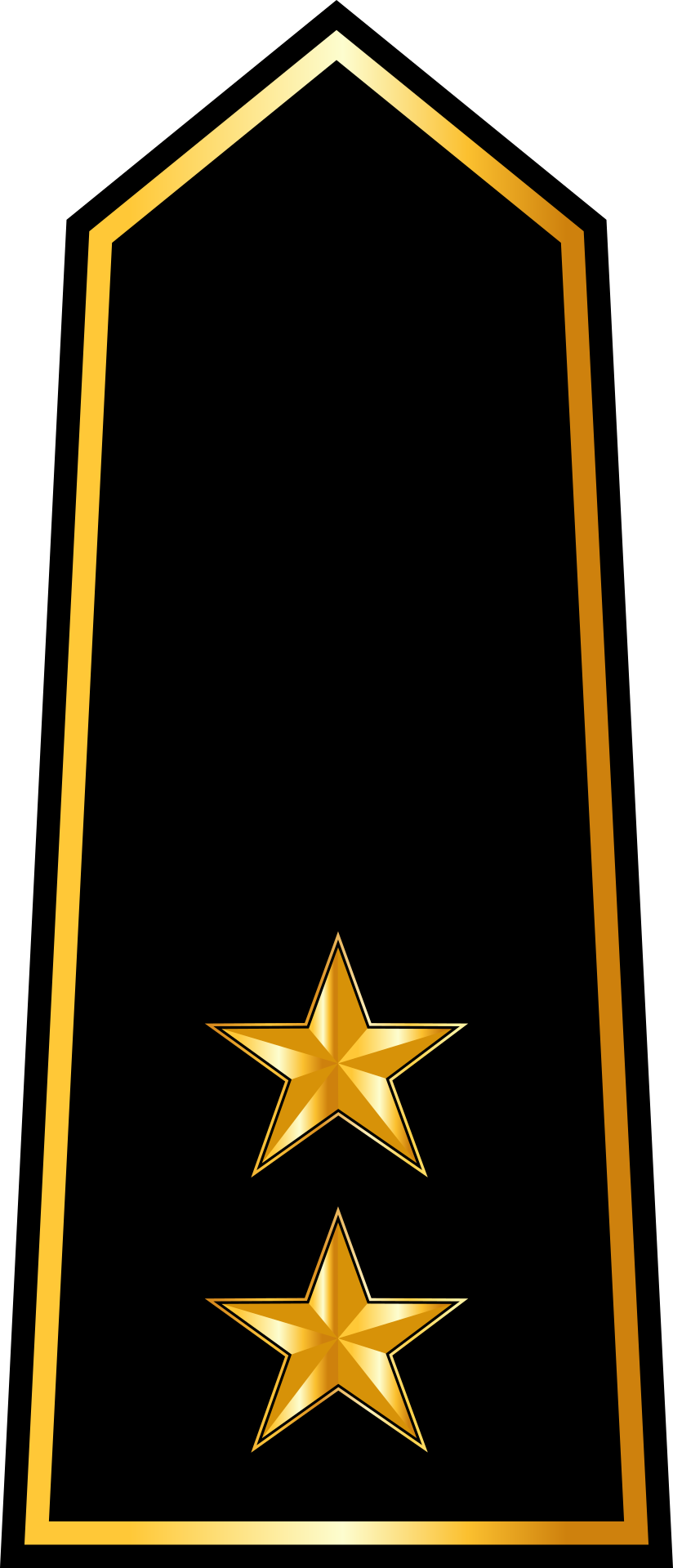
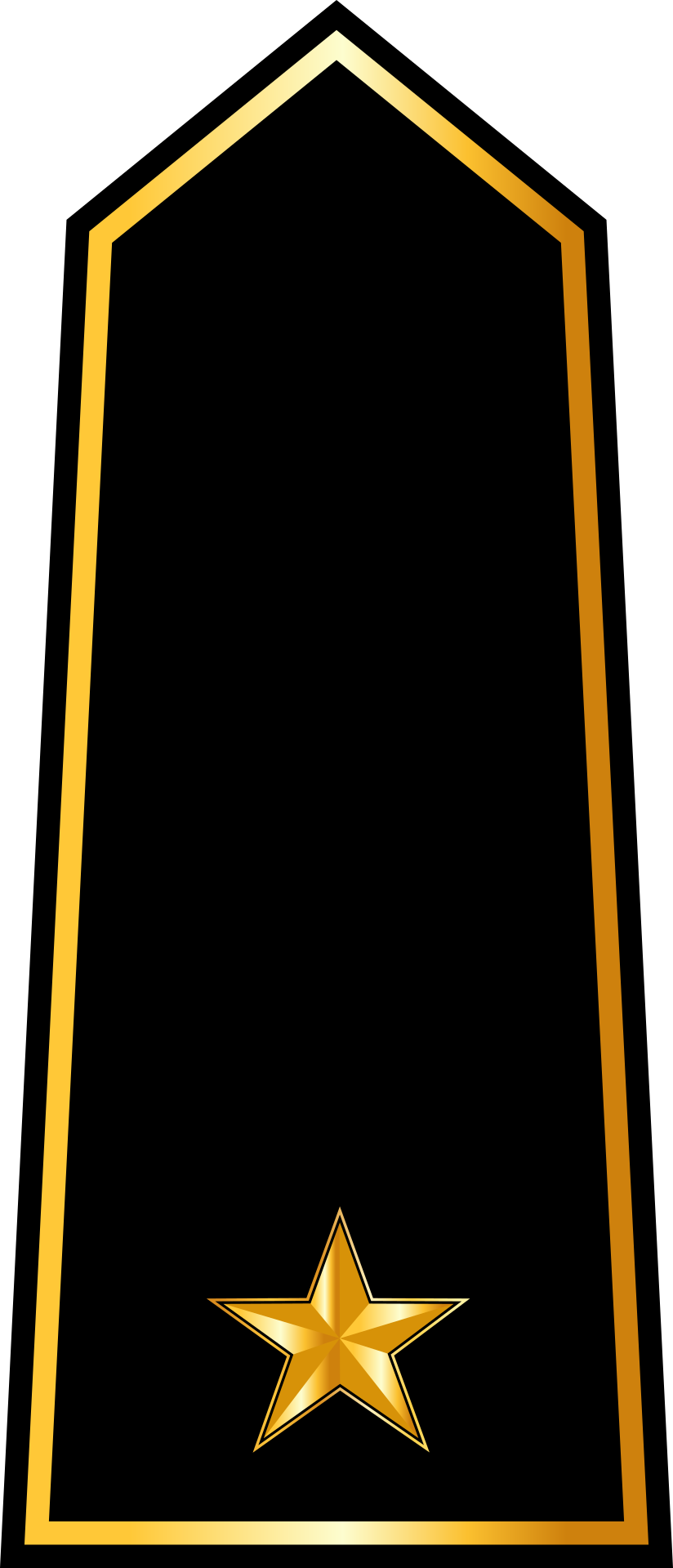
| Rank group | General / flag officers | | | | | Senior officers | | | | Junior officers |
|---|---|---|---|---|---|---|---|---|---|---|---|---|---|
| Algerian Land Forces |
| Algerian Land Forces | | فريق أول; Farīq 'awwal | فريق; Farīq | لواء; Liwāʾ | عميد 'Amīd | عقيد 'Aqīd | | مقدم; Muqaddam | رائد; Rā'id | نقيب; Naqīb | ملازم أول; Mulāzim 'awwal | | ملازم; Mulāzim |
| Algerian Land Forces | | Général d'armée | Général de corps d'armée | Général major | Général | Colonel | | Lieutenant-colonel | Commandant | Capitaine | Lieutenant | | Sous-lieutenant |
| Angolan Army |
| Angolan Army | | General de exército | General | Tenente-general | Brigadeiro | Coronel | | Tenente-coronel | Mayor | Capitão | Tenente | | Sub-tenente |
| Benin Army |
| Benin Army | | Général d'armée | Général de corps d'armée | Général de division | Général de brigade | Colonel | | Lieutenant-colonel | Commandant | Capitaine | Lieutenant | | Sous-lieutenant |
| Botswana Ground Force |
| Botswana Ground Force | | | Lieutenant general | Major general | Brigadier | Colonel | | Lieutenant colonel | Major | Captain | First lieutenant | | Second lieutenant |
| Burkina Faso Ground Forces |
| Burkina Faso Ground Forces | | Général d'armée | Général de corps d'armée | Général de division | Général de brigade | Colonel-major | Colonel | Lieutenant-colonel | Commandant | Capitaine | Lieutenant | | Sous-lieutenant |
| Burundi Army |
| Burundi Army | | Général | Lieutenant-général | Général-major | Général de brigade | Colonel | | Lieutenant-colonel | Major | Capitaine | Lieutenant | | Sous-lieutenant |
| Burundi Army | | Jenerai | Riyetena jenerai | Jenerai majoro | Jenerai wa birigade | Koroneri | | Riyetena koroneri | Majoro | Kapitene | Riyetena | | Suriyetena |
| Cameroon Ground Forces |
| Cameroon Ground Forces | | Général d'armée | Général de corps | Général de division | Général de brigade | Colonel | | Lieutenant-colonel | Commandant | Capitaine | Lieutenant | | Sous-lieutenant |
| Cape Verdean National Guard |
| Cape Verdean National Guard | | | | Major-general | Brigadeiro-general | Coronel | | Tenente-coronel | Major | Capitão | Primeiro tenente | Tenente | Subtenente |
| (Central African Republic) Central African Ground Forces |
| (Central African Republic) Central African Ground Forces | | Général d'armée | Général de corps d'armée | Général de division | Général de brigade | Colonel | | Lieutenant-colonel | Commandant | Capitaine | Lieutenant | | Sous-Lieutenant |
| Chadian Ground Forces |
| Chadian Ground Forces | Maréchal | Général d'armée | Général de corps | Général de division | Général de brigade | Colonel | | Lieutenant-Colonel | Commandant | Capitaine | Lieutenant | | Sous-Lieutenant |
| Comorian Army |
| Comorian Army | | | | Général de division | Général de brigade | Colonel | | Lieutenant-colonel | Commandant | Capitaine | Lieutenant | | Sous-Lieutenant |
| Land Forces of the DR Congo |
| Land Forces of the DR Congo | | Général d'armée | Lieutenant-général | Général-major | Général de brigade | Colonel | | Lieutenant-colonel | Major | Capitaine | Lieutenant | | Sous-lieutenant |
| Rank group | General / flag officers | | | | | Senior officers | | | | Junior officers |
| Congolese Ground Forces |
| Congolese Ground Forces | | Général d'armée | Général de corps | Général de division | Général de brigade | Colonel | | Lieutenant-Colonel | Commandant | Capitaine | Lieutenant | | Sous-lieutenant |
| Djiboutian Army |
| Djiboutian Army | | | | Général de division | Général de brigade | Colonel-major | Colonel | Lieutenant-colonel | Commandant | Capitaine | Lieutenant | | Sous-lieutenant |
| Egyptian Army |
| Egyptian Army | مشیر; Mushir | فريق أول; Fariq 'awal | فريق; Fariq | لواء; Liwa | عميد; Amid | عقيد; Aqid | | مقدم; Muqaddam | رائد; Ra'id | نقيب; Naqib | ملازم أول; Mulazim awwal | | ملازم; Mulazim |
| Army of Equatorial Guinea |
| Army of Equatorial Guinea | | | | General de division | General de brigada | Coronel | | Teniente coronel | Comandante | Capitán | Teniente | | Alférez |
| Eritrean Army |
| Eritrean Army | | | | Major general | Brigadier general | Colonel | | Lieutenant colonel | Major | Captain | First lieutenant | | Second lieutenant |
| Umbutfo Eswatini Defence Force |
| Umbutfo Eswatini Defence Force | Commander in Chief | General | Lieutenant general | Major general | Brigadier | Colonel | | Lieutenant colonel | Major | Captain | Lieutenant | | Second lieutenant |
| Ethiopian Army |
| Ethiopian Army | የፊልድ ማርሻል ጄኔራል; Yefīlidi marishali jēnērali | ጄነራል; Jēnerali | ሌተናል ጄነራል; Lētenali jēnerali | ሜጀር ጄነራል; Mējeri jēnerali | ብርጋዴር ጄነራል; Birigadēri jēnerali | ኮሎኔል; Kolonēli | | ሌተናንት ኮሎኔል; Lētenaniti kolonēli | ሻለቃ; Shalek’a | ሻምበል; Shamibeli | የመቶ ዓለቃ; Yemeto ‘alek’a | | ምክትል የመቶ ዓለቃ; Mikitili yemeto ‘alek’a |
| Gabonese Army |
| Gabonese Army | | Général d'armée | Général de corps d'armée | Général de division | Général de brigade | Colonel | | Lieutenant-colonel | Commandant | Capitaine | Lieutenant | | Sous-Lieutenant |
| Gambian National Army |
| Gambian National Army | | General | Lieutenant general | Major general | Brigadier general | Colonel | | Lieutenant colonel | Major | Captain | First lieutenant | | Second lieutenant |
| Ghana Army |
| Ghana Army | Field marshal | General | Lieutenant general | Major general | Brigadier | Colonel | | Lieutenant colonel | Major | Captain | Lieutenant | | Second lieutenant |
| Guinea Ground Forces |
| Guinea Ground Forces | | Général d'armée | Général de corps d'armée | Général de division | Général de brigade | Colonel | | Lieutenant-colonel | Commandant | Capitaine | Lieutenant | | Sous-lieutenant |
| Army of Guinea-Bissau |
| Army of Guinea-Bissau | | General | Tenente-general | Major-general | Brigadeir-general | Coronel | | Tenente-coronel | Major | Capitão | Primeiro tenente | Tenente | Subtenente |
| Ivory Coast Ground Forces |
| Ivory Coast Ground Forces | | Général d'armée | Général de corps d'armée | Général de division | Général de brigade | Colonel-major | Colonel | Lieutenant-colonel | Commandant | Capitaine | Lieutenant | | Sous-lieutenant |
| Kenya Army |
| Kenya Army | Commander-in-Chief | General | Lieutenant general | Major general | Brigadier | Colonel | | Lieutenant colonel | Major | Captain | Lieutenant | | Second lieutenant |
| Lesotho Army |
| Lesotho Army | Field marshal | | Lieutenant general | Major general | Brigadier | Colonel | | Lieutenant colonel | Major | Captain | Lieutenant | | Second lieutenant |
| Liberian Ground Forces |
| Liberian Ground Forces | | | Lieutenant general | Major general | Brigadier general | Colonel | | Lieutenant colonel | Major | Captain | First lieutenant | | Second lieutenant |
| Rank group | General / flag officers | | | | | Senior officers | | | | Junior officers |
| Libyan Ground Forces |
| Libyan Ground Forces | مشير; Mushir | فريق أول; Fariq 'awal | فريق; Fariq | لواء; Liwa | عميد; Amid | عقيد; Aqid | | مقدم; Muqaddam | رائد; Ra'id | نقيب; Naqib | ملازم أول; Mulazim awwal | | ملازم; Mulazim |
| Madagascar Ground Forces |
| Madagascar Ground Forces | | Général d'armée | Général de corps d'armée | Général de division | Général de brigade | Colonel | | Lieutenant-colonel | Commandant | Capitaine | Lieutenant | | Sous-lieutenant |
| Malawi Army |
| Malawi Army | | General | Lieutenant general | Major general | Brigadier | Colonel | | Lieutenant colonel | Major | Captain | Lieutenant | | Second lieutenant |
| Malian Army |
| Malian Army | | Général d'armée | Général de corps d'armée | Général de division | Général de brigade | Colonel-major | Colonel | Lieutenant-colonel | Commandant | Capitaine | Lieutenant | | Sous-lieutenant |
| Mauritanian National Army |
| Mauritanian National Army | | | فريق; Fariq | لواء; Liwa | | عميد; Amid | | مقدم; Muqaddam | رائد; Ra'id | نقيب; Naqib | ملازم أول; Mulazim awwal | | ملازم; Mulazim |
| Mauritius | No army |
| Royal Moroccan Army |
| Royal Moroccan Army | Mushir | Fariq harb | Fariq 'awwal | Fariq | Liwa' | Amīd | Aqīd | Muquddam | Rã'id | Naqīd | Mulāzim 'awwal | | Mulāzim |
| Royal Moroccan Army | Maréchal | Général d'armée | Général de corps d'armée | Général de division | Général de brigade | Colonel-major | Colonel | Lieutenant-colonel | Commandant | Capitaine | Lieutenant | | Sous-lieutenant |
| Mozambican Army |
| Mozambican Army | | Coronel-general | Tenente-general | Major-general | | Coronel | | Tenente-coronel | Major | Capitão | Tenente | | Alferes |
| Namibian Army |
| Namibian Army | | General | Lieutenant general | Major general | Brigadier general | Colonel | | Lieutenant colonel | Major | Captain | Lieutenant | | Second lieutenant |
| Niger Army |
| Niger Army | | Général d'armée | Général de corps d'armée | Général de division | Général de brigade | Colonel-major | Colonel | Lieutenant-colonel | Commandant | Capitaine | Lieutenant | | Sous-lieutenant |
| Nigerian Army |
| Nigerian Army | Field marshal | General | Lieutenant general | Major general | Brigadier-general | Colonel | | Lieutenant colonel | Major | Captain | Lieutenant | | Second lieutenant |
| Rwandan Land Forces |
| Rwandan Land Forces | | General | Lieutenant general | Major general | Brigadier general | Colonel | | Lieutenant colonel | Major | Captain | Lieutenant | | Second lieutenant |
| Rank group | General / flag officers | | | | | Senior officers | | | | Junior officers |
| Army of São Tomé and Príncipe |
| Army of São Tomé and Príncipe | | | | | Brigadeiro | Coronel | | Tenente-coronel | Major | Capitão | Tenente | | Alferes |
| Senegalese Army |
| Senegalese Army | | | Général de corps d'armée | Général de division | Général de brigade | Colonel | | Lieutenant-colonel | Commandant | Capitaine | Lieutenant | | Sous-lieutenant |
| Seychelles Army |
| Seychelles Army | | | | Major general (Note: Introduced December 2024) | Brigadier general | Colonel | | Lieutenant colonel | Major | Captain | Lieutenant | | Second lieutenant |
| Sierra Leone Army |
| Sierra Leone Army | | General | Lieutenant general | Major general | Brigadier | Colonel | | Lieutenant colonel | Major | Captain | First lieutenant | | Second lieutenant |
| Somali National Army |
| Somali National Army | | | Sareeye guud | Sareeye gaas | Sareeye guuto | Gashaanle sare | | Gashaanle dhexe | Gashaanle | Dhamme | Laba xídígle | | Xídígle |
| Somaliland National Army |
| Somaliland National Army | | | Sareeye guud | Sareeye gaas | Sareeye guuto | Gashaanle sare | | Gashaanle dhexe | Gashaanle | Dhamme | Laba xídígle | | Xídígle |
| South African Army |
| South African Army | | General | Lieutenant general | Major general | Brigadier general | Colonel | | Lieutenant colonel | Major | Captain | Lieutenant | | Second lieutenant |
| South Sudan Army |
| South Sudan Army | Field marshal | General | Lieutenant general | Major general | Brigadier | Colonel | | Lieutenant colonel | Major | Captain | First lieutenant | | Second lieutenant |
| Sudanese Army |
| Sudanese Army | مشیر; Mushir | فريق أول; Fariq 'awal | فريق; Fariq | لواء; Liwa | عميد; Amid | عقيد; Aqid | | مقدم; Muqaddam | رائد; Ra'id | نقيب; Naqib | ملازم أول; Mulazim awwal | | ملازم; Mulazim |
| Tanzanian Army |
| Tanzanian Army | | Jenerali | Luteni jenerali | Meja jenerali | Brigedia jenerali | Kanali | | Luteni kanali | Meja | Kapteni | Luteni | | Luteni usu |
| Togolese Army |
| Togolese Army | | | | Général de division | Général de brigade | Colonel | | Lieutenant-colonel | Commandant | Capitaine | Lieutenant | | Sous-lieutenant |
| Tunisian Army |
| Tunisian Army | | | فريق أول; Fariq 'awal | فريق; Fariq | أمير لواء 'amir liwa' | عميد; Amid | عقيد; Aqid | مقدم; Muqaddam | رائد; Ra'id | نقيب; Naqib | ملازم أول; Mulazim awwal | | ملازم; Mulazim |
| Tunisian Army | | | Général de corps d'armée | Général de division | Général de brigade | Colonel-major | Colonel | Lieutenant-colonel | Commandant | Capitaine | Lieutenant | | Sous-lieutenant |
| Ugandan Land Forces |
| Ugandan Land Forces | | General | Lieutenant general | Major general | Brigadier general | Colonel | | Lieutenant colonel | Major | Captain | Lieutenant | | Second lieutenant |
| Zambian Army |
| Zambian Army | | General | Lieutenant general | Major general | Brigadier | Colonel | | Lieutenant colonel | Major | Captain | Lieutenant | | Second lieutenant |
| Zimbabwe National Army |
| Zimbabwe National Army | | General | Lieutenant general | Major general | Brigadier | Colonel | | Lieutenant colonel | Major | Captain | Lieutenant | | Second lieutenant |
| Rank group | General / flag officers | | | | | Senior officers | | | | Junior officers |

== See also ==
- Comparative army officer ranks of the Americas
- Ranks and insignia of NATO armies officers
