= Chief of Staff of the Armed Forces (São Tomé and Príncipe) =

- Chefe de Estado Maior das FASTP
- Incumbent; Brigadier Idalécio Pachire since 18 May 2019
- Term length: 3 years, extendable by the government
- Formation: 2012

The Chief of Staff of the Armed Forces of São Tomé and Príncipe (Portuguese: Chefe de Estado Maior das FASTP) is the highest-ranking military officer of in the Armed Forces of São Tomé and Príncipe, who is responsible for maintaining the operational command of the military.

== List of officeholders ==
=== Commander of the Armed Forces ===
| Portrait | Name | Took office | Left office | Time in office | Ref. |
|---|---|---|---|---|---|
| Idalécio Pachire | Colonel; Idalécio Pachire | 2003 | 2011 | 7–8 years | |

=== Chief of staff ===
| No. | Portrait | Name | Took office | Left office | Time in office | Ref. |
|---|---|---|---|---|---|---|
| 1 | Felisberto Maria Segundo | Brigadier; Felisberto Maria Segundo | August 2012 | 13 February 2014 | 1 year, 6 months | |
| 2 | Justino Lima | Brigadier; Justino Lima | 18 February 2014 | 30 January 2015 | 11 months | |
| – | Olinto Amado Paquete | Colonel; Olinto Amado Paquete; Acting | 30 January 2015 | 3 July 2015 | 5 months | |
| 3 | Horácio Sousa | Brigadier; Horácio Sousa | 3 July 2015 | 18 May 2019 | 3 years, 10 months | |
| 4 | Idalécio Pachire | Brigadier; Idalécio Pachire | 18 May 2019 | Incumbent | 7 years, 3 months | |
