= Military ranks of São Tomé and Príncipe =

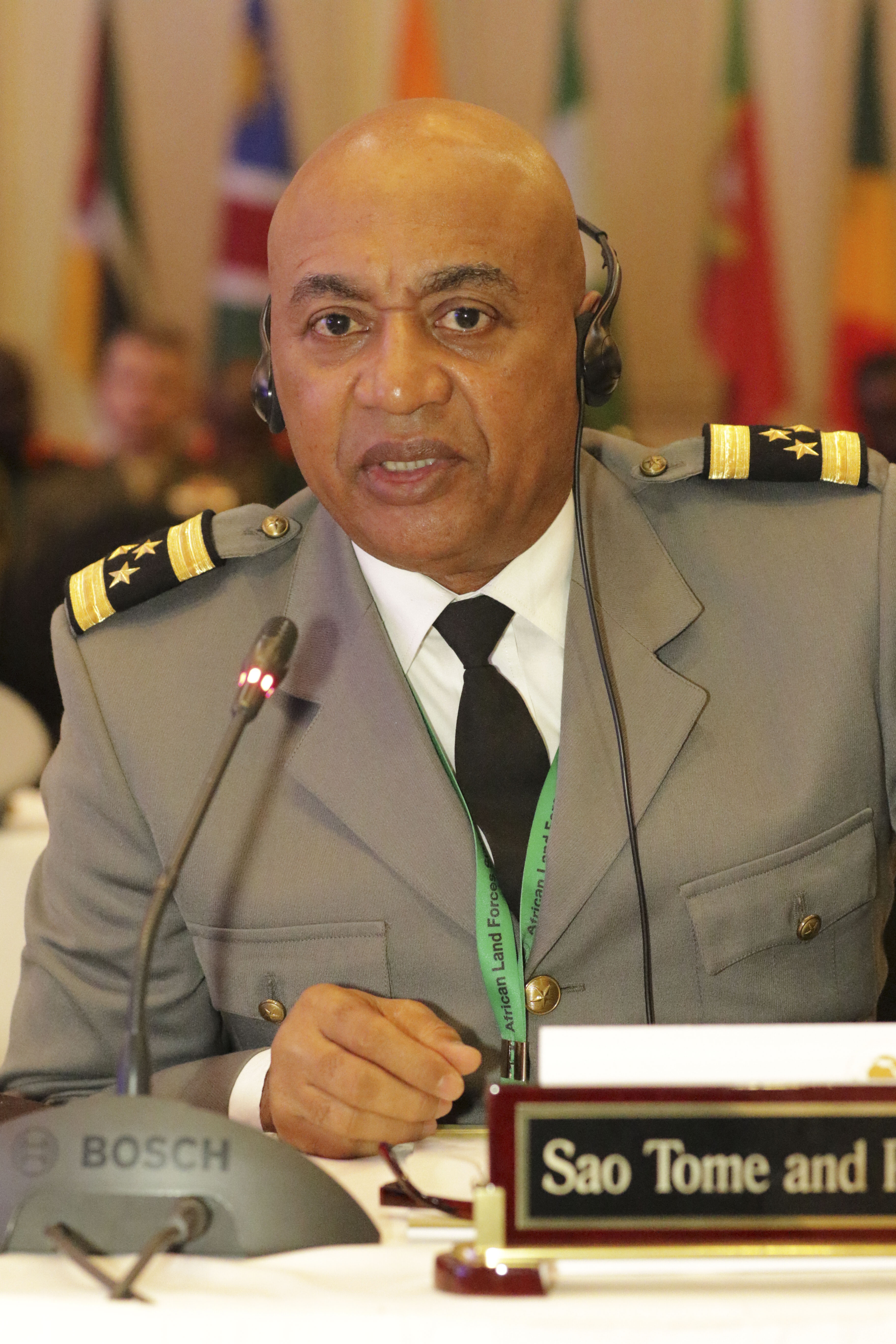
A São Toméan army officer of Coronel rank

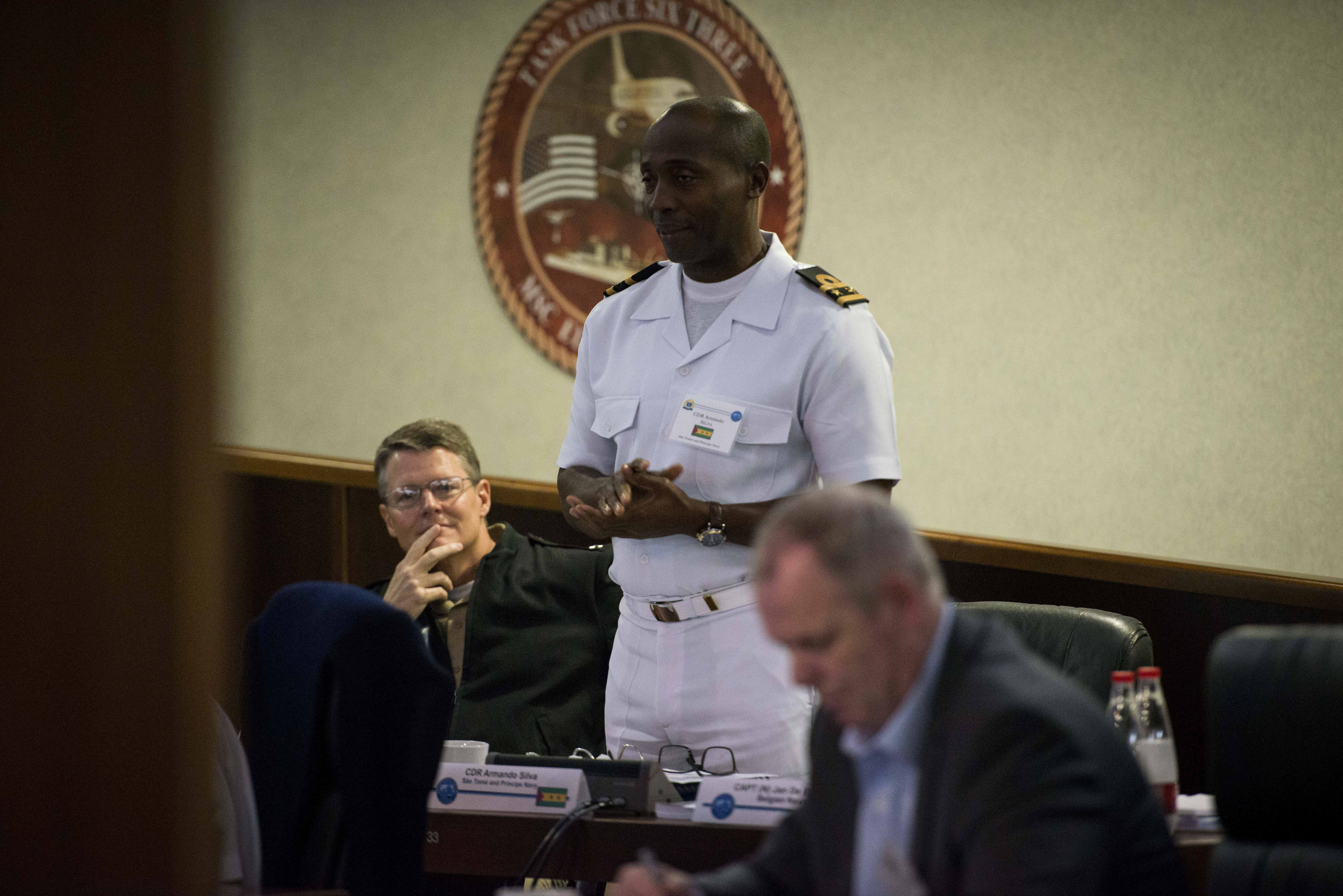
A São Toméan Navy Officer of Capitão de Fragata rank

The Military ranks of São Tomé and Príncipe are the military insignia used by the Armed Forces of São Tomé and Príncipe.

== Commissioned officer ranks ==
The rank insignia of commissioned officers.

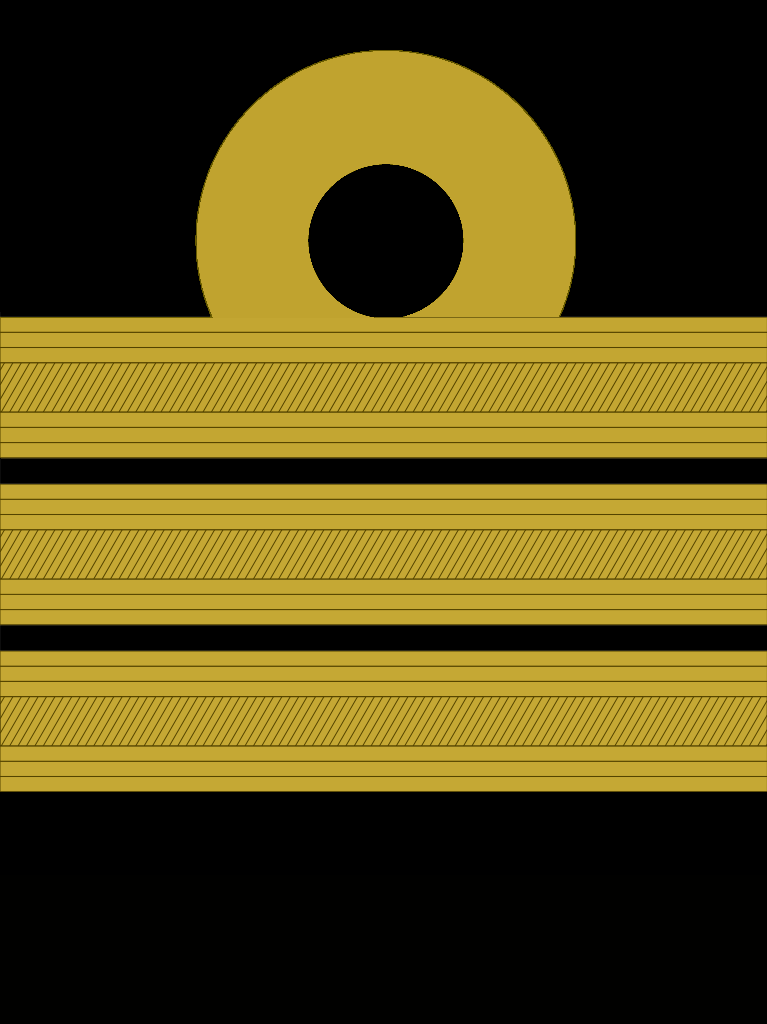
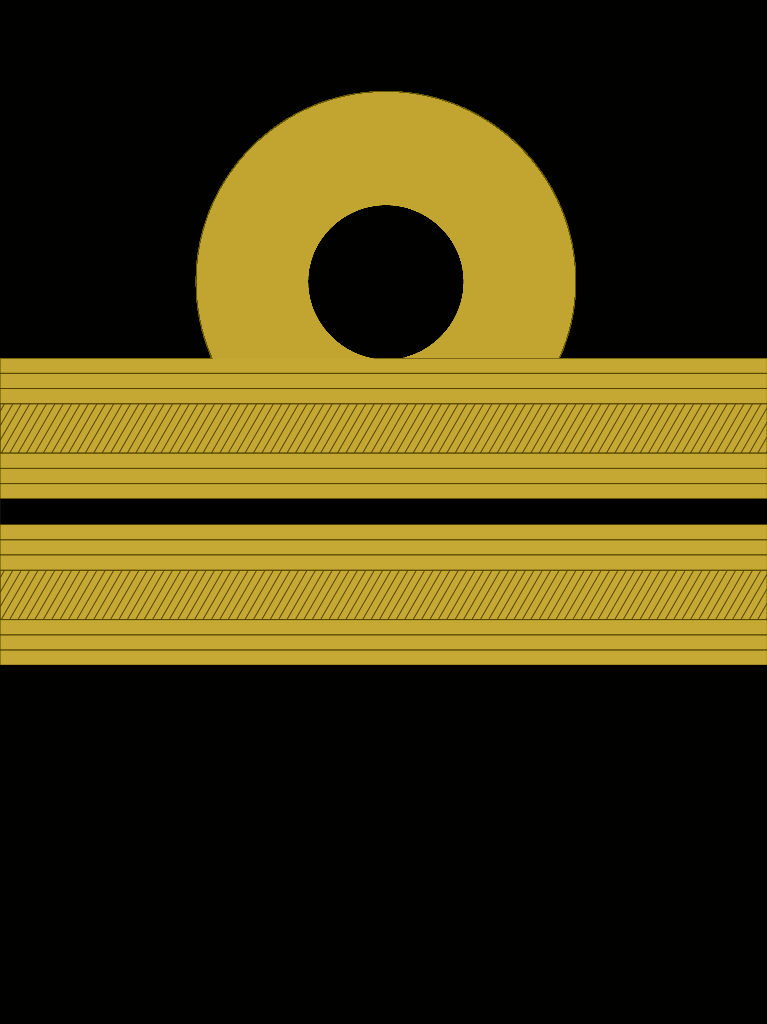
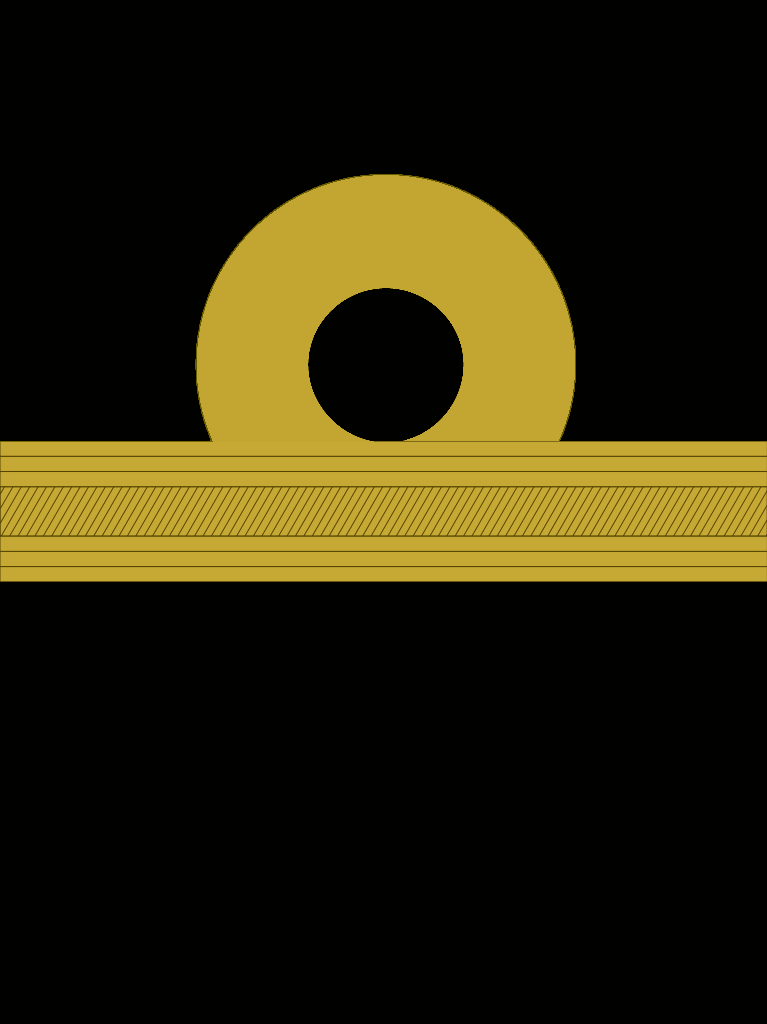
Rank group	General / flag officers	Senior officers			Junior officers
Army of São Tomé and Príncipe
Army of São Tomé and Príncipe	Brigadeiro	Coronel	Tenente-coronel	Major	Capitão	Tenente	Alferes
Coast Guard of São Tomé and Príncipe
Coast Guard of São Tomé and Príncipe		Capitão de mar e guerra	Capitão de fragata	Capitão-tenente	Primeiro-tenente	Segundo-tenente	Guarda-marinha/ Subtenente
Rank group	General / flag officers	Senior officers			Junior officers

=== Student officer ranks ===
Rank group	Student officer
Armed Forces of São Tomé and Príncipe
Armed Forces of São Tomé and Príncipe	Aspirante

== Other ranks ==
The rank insignia of non-commissioned officers and enlisted personnel.

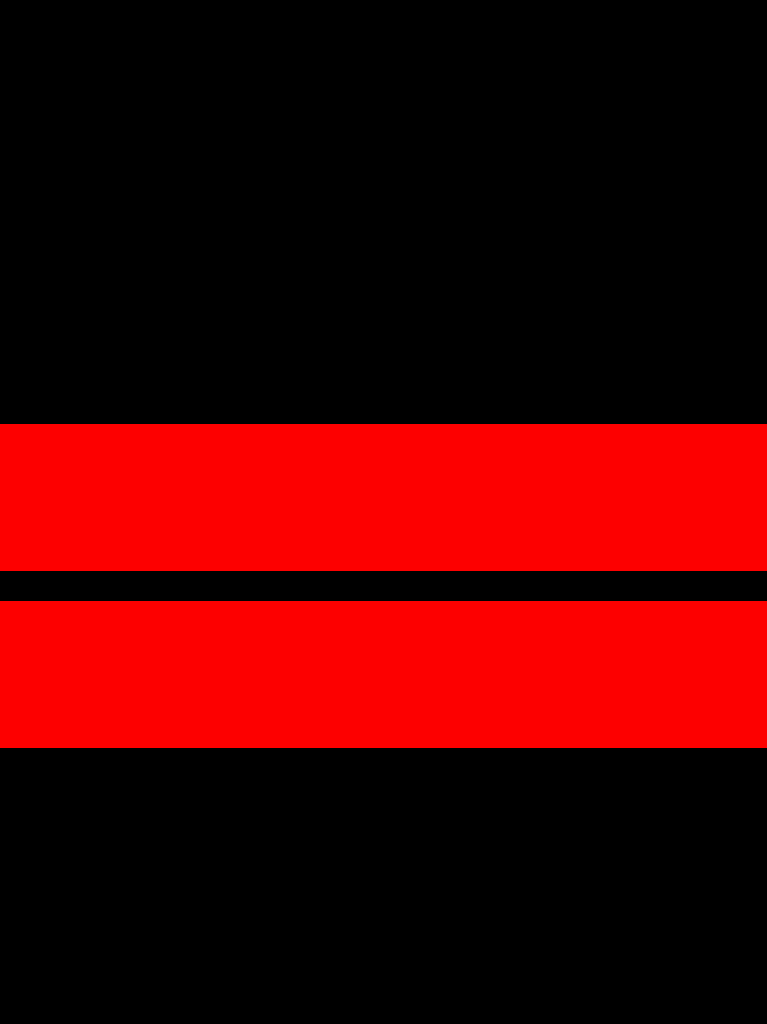
Rank group	Senior NCOs							Junior NCOs		Enlisted
Army of São Tomé and Príncipe
Army of São Tomé and Príncipe	Sargento-mor	Sargento-chefe	Sargento-ajudante	Primeiro-sargento	Segundo-sargento	Furriel	Segundo-furriel	Cabo de Secção	Cabo-adjunto	Primeiro-cabo	Segundo-cabo	Soldado
Coast Guard of São Tomé and Príncipe												No insignia
Coast Guard of São Tomé and Príncipe	Sargento-mor	Sargento-chefe	Sargento-ajudante	Primeiro-sargento	Segundo-sargento	Primerio-subsargento	Subsargento	Cabo	Primeiro-marinheiro	Segundo-marinheiro		Grumete
Rank group	Senior NCOs							Junior NCOs		Enlisted
