= Armed Forces of São Tomé and Príncipe =

Combined military forces of São Tomé and Príncipe

- Forças Armadas de São Tomé e Príncipe
- Service branches: Army; Coast Guard; Marine Corps; National Guard; Presidential Guard
- Headquarters: São Tomé

Leadership
- President: Carlos Vila Nova
- Prime Minister: Patrice Trovoada
- Minister of Defence and Internal Order: Lieutenant-Colonel Óscar Sousa
- Chief of Staff: Brigadier Idalécio Pachire

Personnel
- Active personnel: 300 (2009)

Expenditure
- Budget: $561,771 (2020)
- Percent of GDP: 0.1% (2020)

Industry
- Foreign suppliers: Portugal; United States

Related articles
- Ranks: Military ranks of São Tomé and Príncipe

The Armed Forces of São Tomé and Príncipe (Portuguese: Forças Armadas de São Tomé e Príncipe, FASTP) are the armed forces of the island nation of São Tomé and Príncipe, off the coast of West Africa. The islands' military consists of a small land and naval contingent, with a limited budget. Sitting adjacent to strategically important sea lane of communication in the Gulf of Guinea, due to recent concerns about regional security issues including security for oil tankers transiting the area, the US military and other foreign navies have increased their engagement with the FASTP, providing the country with assistance in the form of construction projects and training missions, as well as integration into international information and intelligence sharing programs.

== History ==
The formation dates back to 1968. In the early years of independence only a barrack police force of insignificant numbers was maintained. The FASTP remains a very small force, consisting of four branches: Army (Exército), Coast Guard (Guarda Costeira also called "Navy"), Presidential Guard (Guarda Presidencial), and the National Guard. There is no air force. Since the end of the Cold War, the nation's military budget has been steadily decreased. Despite the discovery of large oil reserves in the mid-2000s the Sao Tomean military is largely reliant upon foreign financial assistance, and it remains the least funded force in Africa. In the 2005 fiscal year, military expenditures were $581,729, about 0.8% of São Tomé and Príncipe's gross domestic product. A 2004 estimate put military manpower availability (males age 15–49) at 38,347, with a "fit for military service" estimate of 20,188. In a 2009 article, it was reported the FASTP consisted of a total of just 300 soldiers, which was reduced from 600 after an unsuccessful coup attempt in 2003 resulted in a reorganization aimed at ensuring an apolitical military that is subordinated to civilian political structures. It is believed that the Army is formed into two companies, headquartered on the main island of Sao Tome, with a detachment on the smaller island of Principe.

== Capabilities ==
São Tomé and Príncipe's military is a small force – reputedly the smallest in Africa – with almost no resources at its disposal and would be wholly ineffective operating unilaterally with no force projection capabilities. Additionally, legislatively there is no requirement for personnel to deploy overseas and there is no reserve capacity. The limited equipment that the military possesses is reported nearing the end of its lifespan and while its basic small arms are considered simple to operate and maintain they may be of limited serviceability and may require refurbishment or replacement after 20–25 years in tropical climates. Poor pay, working conditions, and alleged nepotism in the promotion of officers have caused tension in the past, as evidenced by unsuccessful coups that were launched in 1995 and 2003.

These coups were ultimately unsuccessful and in the aftermath, reforms have been implemented by the government, with foreign financial assistance, to address the underlying issues that the coups highlighted and to work to improve civil-military relations within the nation. These reforms have been aimed at improving the army and providing it with a more defined role, focusing on realistic security concerns. As of 2005, command is exercised from the president, through the Minister of Defense, to the Chief of the Armed Forces staff. Nevertheless, tension between the military and the government of the island nation has remained, and in February 2014, elements of the military went on strike due to pay and conditions disputes, after which a new military chief was appointed by President Manuel Pinto da Costa with Colonel Justino Lima replacing Brigadier Felisberto Maria Segundo.

== Branches ==
- Army;
  - National Guard
  - Presidential Guard
- Coast Guard, also called Navy
  - Marine Corps, branch of the Coast Guard

== Military and naval equipment ==
According to Jane's, São Tomé and Príncipe's military is equipped largely with low technology small arms, rocket launchers and some heavy machine guns. A limited anti-armor and air defense capability is also maintained, most of which has been sourced from former Soviet stocks. Uniforms and load carriage equipment were upgraded in 2007–08 following a donation from Portugal. Light vehicles have also been procured from South Africa and Nigeria.

Sao Tome has an exclusive economic zone of 142,563 square kilometers, and a naval force of around fifty volunteers. The country's coast guard's main role is the protection of this EEZ, and the areas where oil and gas exploration are being considered. In 2005, the US provided a 27-foot Boston Whaler Challenger (8.2 m) inshore patrol vessel. It has also been reported that the coast guard also operates some Zodiac Hurricane Rigid Hull Inflatable Boats, at least one Wilson Sons SY LAEP 10 Águia, and a 42-foot Archangel-Class Fast Response Boat.

Since 2018 the Portuguese Navy has had a patrol boat deployed in the country.

=== Infantry weapons ===
- Uzi
- MP5
- PPS
- SKS
- AK-47
- AKM
- AK-74
- PK
- MG3

=== Anti-aircraft artillery ===
Sources:

- ZPU-2
- ZPU-4
- ZU-23

=== Anti-armor ===
Sources:

- RPG-7
- SPG-9
- B-10

=== Vehicles ===
Sources:

- BRDM-1
- BRDM-2
- BTR-60
- Unimog
- Daihatsu Delta
- Toyota Land Cruiser
- Land Rover Defender
- Jeep Wrangler
- ACMAT VLRA

== International military engagement ==
São Tomé and Príncipe has traditionally had strong ties with both Portugal and Angola. In the past the United States has provided the country with occasional assistance; however, US interest in the region has increased since the start of the Global War of Terrorism. The position of the country along strategically important sea lanes of communication along the west African coast, as well as rising concerns about piracy and security for oil tankers transiting through the region, has seen increased foreign interest in the nation. This has seen São Tomé and Príncipe's military become part of the NATO-sponsored Maritime Safety and Security Information System, as well as the commencement of several engagement activities on the part of the US military. It has also seen Sao Tomean officers undertaking training in the United States under the terms of the International Military Education and Training program.

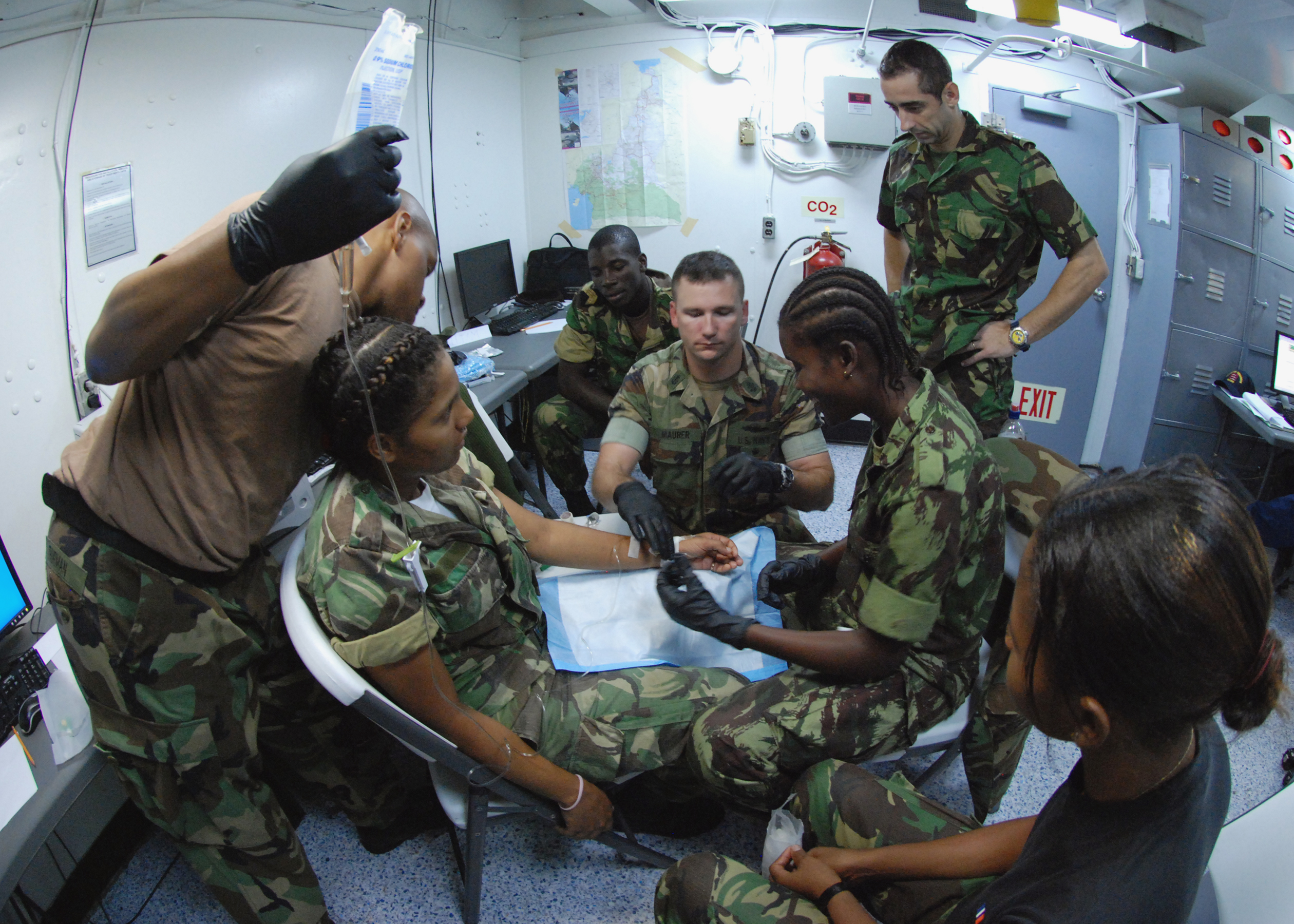
Sao Tomean personnel undergo medical training with US Naval corpsmen

In 2002, it was announced that an unoccupied US naval facility would be established in the country, to be used mainly a stopover base for US military aircraft and ships transiting the area. In late 2004, the US Navy began exploring further options for maritime engagement in the Gulf of Guinea area, and delegates from Sao Tome and Principle attended a conference in Naples, Italy, after which the US submarine tender USS Emory S. Land conducted a training mission in the area as part of steps towards the establishment of United States Africa Command.

In July 2005, USCGC Bear, under the command of then-Commander Robert Wagner, visited and conducted training sessions for personnel from the São Tomé and Príncipe coast guard as part of US international engagement efforts. In July 2007, the Military Sealift Command-contracted cargo ship CEC Endeavor delivered construction equipment to São Tomé as part of a construction effort by US Navy personnel from Naval Mobile Construction Battalion 133 and Underwater Construction Team One, to renovate the boat ramp for the Santomean coast guard base (currently the only boat ramp is unable to launch patrol boats due to erosion and shallow slope into the water) as well as to build a guard house for the base. In 2015, elements of the country's coast guard took part in a multinational exercise, Exercise Obangame, with the US Navy and other African nations which included training focused upon "boarding techniques, search and rescue operations, medical casualty response, radio communication, and information management techniques". As part of the exercise, the Portuguese frigate Bartolmeu Dias made a port visit to São Tomé and Príncipe to provide training to local naval personnel. Portugal has also provided communications training, while France, the United Kingdom and South Africa have also provided assistance.

Between 2018 and 2023, the exclusive economic zone of São Tomé and Príncipe was supervised by the ship NRP Zaire of the Portuguese Navy, with a Portuguese and Sao Tomean crew, serving for the local military to improve their techniques and the development of defense and maritime security capabilities in the Gulf of Guinea. The Portuguese Marines aboard this vessel have been training the military of São Tomé in techniques for boarding ships on the high seas. Since 2015, the Portuguese vessel has also been providing assistance on the high seas and fighting piracy. In 2023, the patrol vessel NRP Zaire was replaced by the NRP Centauro patrol boat and the EAV Príncipe patrol vessel.
