= 1965 in Kuwait =

- Decades: 1940s; 1950s; 1960s; 1970s; 1980s
- See also: Other events of 1965; List of years in Kuwait; Timeline of Kuwaiti history

Events from the year 1965 in Kuwait.

== Incumbents ==
- Emir: Abdullah Al-Salim Al-Sabah (until 24 November), Sabah Al-Salim Al-Sabah (starting 24 November)
- Prime Minister: Sabah Al-Salim Al-Sabah (until 27 November), Jaber Al-Ahmad Al-Sabah (starting 27 November)

== Births ==
- 29 May - Ali Hasan
- 9 December - Mohamed Ghaloum

== See also ==
- Years in Jordan
- Years in Syria
