= 1977 in Kuwait =

- Decades: 1950s; 1960s; 1970s; 1980s; 1990s
- See also: Other events of 1977; List of years in Kuwait; Timeline of Kuwaiti history

Events from the year 1977 in Kuwait.

== Incumbents ==
- Emir: Sabah Al-Salim Al-Sabah (until 31 December) Jaber Al-Ahmad Al-Jaber Al-Sabah (starting 31 December)
- Prime Minister: Jaber Al-Ahmad Al-Sabah

== Births ==
- 2 January - Khaled Al Shammari
- 3 April - Fawaz Al-Shammari
- 14 August - Youssef Al Thuwaney

== See also ==
- Years in Jordan
- Years in Syria
