= 1974 in Kuwait =

- Decades: 1950s; 1960s; 1970s; 1980s; 1990s
- See also: Other events of 1974; List of years in Kuwait; Timeline of Kuwaiti history

Events from the year 1974 in Kuwait.

== Incumbents ==
- Emir: Sabah Al-Salim Al-Sabah
- Prime Minister: Jaber Al-Ahmad Al-Sabah

== Births ==
- 15 May - Khaled Al Fadhli
- 21 March - Jamal Mubarak

== See also ==
- Years in Jordan
- Years in Syria
