= 1975 in Kuwait =

- Decades: 1950s; 1960s; 1970s; 1980s; 1990s
- See also: Other events of 1975; List of years in Kuwait; Timeline of Kuwaiti history

Events from the year 1975 in Kuwait.

== Incumbents ==
- Emir: Sabah Al-Salim Al-Sabah
- Prime Minister: Jaber Al-Ahmad Al-Sabah

== Births ==
- 21 March - Yacoub Al-Mohana.
- 3 June - Faiz Mohammed Ahmed Al Kandari.
- 18 June - Khalid Abdullah Mishal al Mutairi.

== See also ==
- Years in Jordan
- Years in Syria
