= 1981 in Kuwait =

- Decades: 1960s; 1970s; 1980s; 1990s; 2000s
- See also: Other events of 1981; List of years in Kuwait; Timeline of Kuwaiti history

Events from the year 1981 in Kuwait.

== Incumbents ==
- Emir: Jaber Al-Ahmad Al-Jaber Al-Sabah
- Prime Minister: Saad Al-Salim Al-Sabah

== Births ==
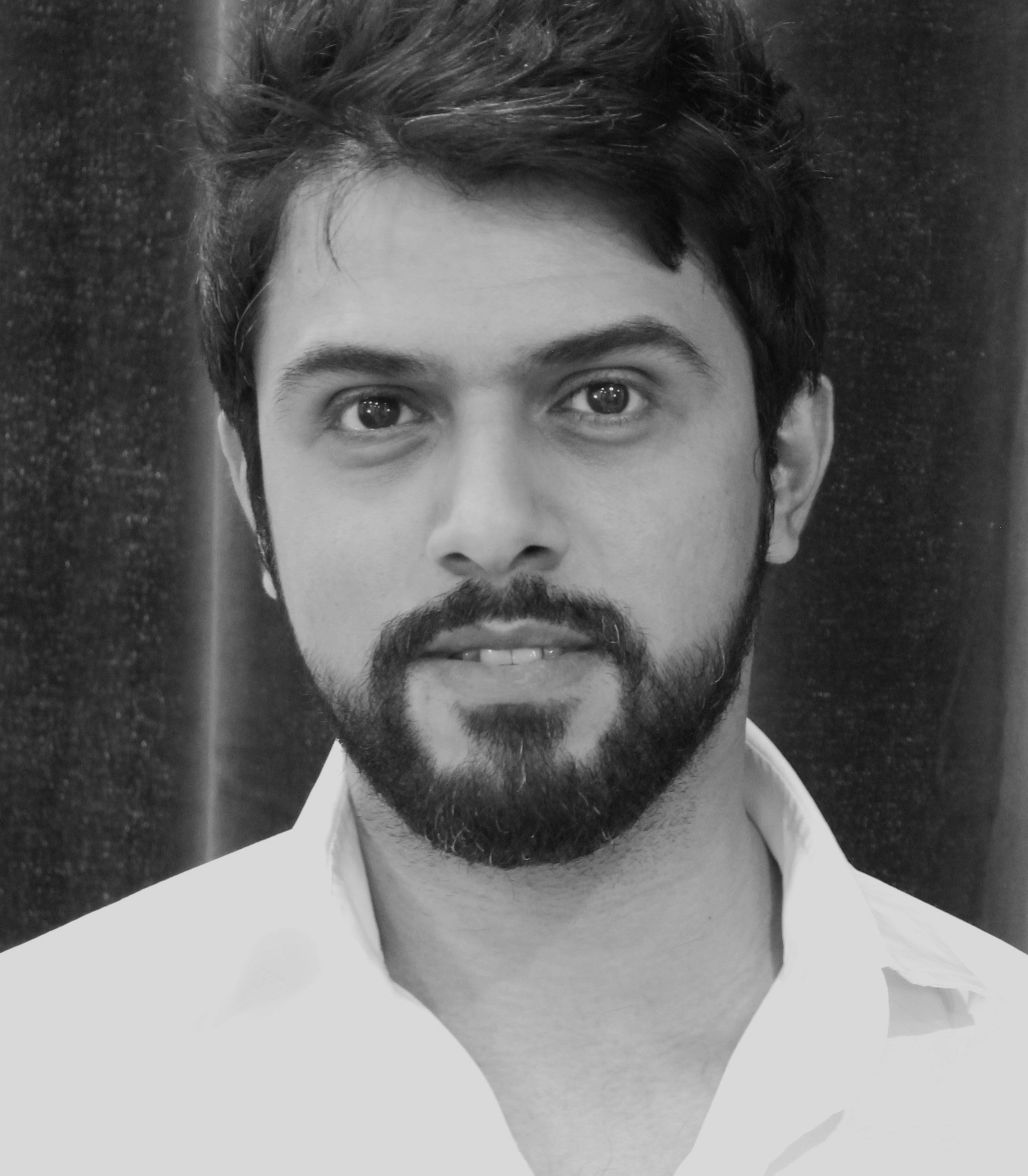
Saud Alsanousi

- 28 April – Shehab Kankoune, footballer
- 25 May – Nawaf Al Khaldi, footballer
- 27 May – Saud Alsanousi, novelist and journalist
- 7 June – Ema Shah, singer
- 15 October – Jarah Al Ateeqi, footballer
- 3 November – Waleed Ali, footballer
- 10 November – Mohamed Jarragh, footballer
