= 1963 in Kuwait =

- Decades: 1940s; 1950s; 1960s; 1970s; 1980s
- See also: Other events of 1963; List of years in Kuwait; Timeline of Kuwaiti history

Events from the year 1963 in Kuwait.

== Incumbents ==
- Emir: Abdullah Al-Salim Al-Sabah
- Prime Minister: Abdullah Al-Salim Al-Sabah (until 2 February), Sabah Al-Salim Al-Sabah (starting 2 February)

== Events ==
- Kuwaiti general election, 1963

== Births ==
- 22 February - Mohamed Al-Thuwani, fencer
- 24 April - Osama Al-Khurafi, fencer
- 5 November - Samir Said, footballer (d. 2012)
