= 1978 in Kuwait =

- Decades: 1950s; 1960s; 1970s; 1980s; 1990s
- See also: Other events of 1978; List of years in Kuwait; Timeline of Kuwaiti history

Events from the year 1978 in Kuwait.

== Incumbents ==
- Emir: Jaber Al-Ahmad Al-Jaber Al-Sabah
- Prime Minister: Jaber Al-Ahmad Al-Sabah (until 8 February), Saad Al-Salim Al-Sabah (starting 8 February)

== Births ==
- 2 August - Abdallah al-Ajmi.

== See also ==
- Years in Jordan
- Years in Syria
