= 1964 in Kuwait =

- Decades: 1940s; 1950s; 1960s; 1970s; 1980s
- See also: Other events of 1964; List of years in Kuwait; Timeline of Kuwaiti history

Events from the year 1964 in Kuwait.

== Incumbents ==
- Emir: Abdullah Al-Salim Al-Sabah
- Prime Minister: Sabah Al-Salim Al-Sabah

== Births ==
- 13 September - Khaled Al-Awadhi.

== See also ==
- Years in Jordan
- Years in Syria
