= List of ambassadors of Kuwait to China =

Coordinates: 39.913763°N 116.438581°E

Ambassador of Kuwait to the People's Republic of China
- Incumbent; Sameeh Essa Johar Hayat since December 2, 2016
- Inaugural holder: Abd. Hammeed Abd. Razzaq Soud al-Buai jam
- Formation: 1972

The Kuwaiti ambassador in Beijing is the official representative of the Government in Kuwait City to the Government of the People's Republic of China.

- The governments in Beijing and Kuwait City established diplomatic relations at the ambassadorial level on March 22, 1971.

== List of representatives ==
Diplomatic agrément/Diplomatic accreditation	ambassador	Observations	List of emirs of Kuwait	Premier of the People's Republic of China	Term end
1972	Abd. Hammeed Abd. Razzaq Soud al-Buai jam		Sabah Al-Salim Al-Sabah	Zhou Enlai	1973
1975	M.A.A. Abu al-Hassan		Sabah Al-Salim Al-Sabah	Zhou Enlai	1978
1979	Mohammed Zeid al-Herbish	Mohammad Zaid al-Herbish	Jaber Al-Ahmad Al-Sabah	Hua Guofeng	1982
February 8, 1984	Abdulhadi Al-Mahmeed	Abdulhadi Hadji al-Mahmeed, Abdulhadi H. Al-Mahmeed	Jaber Al-Ahmad Al-Sabah	Zhao Ziyang	1987
1988	Hasan Ali al-Dabbagh		Jaber Al-Ahmad Al-Sabah	Li Peng	1990
1995	Ghazi Mohammed Amin Al-Rayes		Jaber Al-Ahmad Al-Sabah	Li Peng	
2002	Abdul-Mohsen Naser A. Jeaan		Jaber Al-Ahmad Al-Sabah	Zhu Rongji	
January 17, 2003	Faisal Rashed Al-Ghais		Jaber Al-Ahmad Al-Sabah	Wen Jiabao	2006
February 14, 2011	Mohammad Saleh Althuwaikh	Mohammad S. Al Thuwaikh	Sabah Al-Ahmad Al-Jaber Al-Sabah	Wen Jiabao	September 13, 2016
December 2, 2016	Sameeh Essa Johar Hayat		Sabah Al-Ahmad Al-Jaber Al-Sabah	Li Keqiang	
