= Mohamed Ghaloum =

Kuwaiti fencer

Personal information
- Born: 9 December 1965 (age 60)

Sport
- Sport: Fencing

Mohamed Ghaloum (born 9 December 1965) is a Kuwaiti former fencer. He competed in the team foil event at the 1984 Summer Olympics, and had a record of 0-5.
