= Samer Al Marta =

Kuwaiti footballer

Personal information
- Full name: Samer Jassim Al Marta
- Date of birth: July 1, 1972 (age 54)
- Place of birth: Kuwait City, Kuwait
- Height: 1.84 m (6 ft 0 in)
- Position: Defender

Youth career
- Al Salmiya

Senior career*
Years	Team	Apps	(Gls)
1999–2006	Al Salmiya		
2006–2011	Al Kuwait		

International career^{‡}
2002–2003	Kuwait	5	(0)
- * Club domestic league appearances and goals as of November 5, 2010 ‡ National team caps and goals as of November 5, 2010

Samer Al Marta (Arabic: سامر المرطة; born 1 July 1972) is a Kuwaiti footballer who is a defender for the Kuwaiti Premier League club Al Kuwait.
