= Youssef Al Thuwaney =

Kuwaiti footballer

Personal information
- Full name: Youssef Al Thuwaney
- Date of birth: 14 August 1977 (age 49)
- Place of birth: Kuwait, Kuwait
- Height: 1.84 m (6 ft 0 in)
- Position: Goalkeeper

Youth career
- 1989: Khaitan

Senior career*
Years	Team	Apps	(Gls)
1997–2004	Khaitan	31	(0)
2005–2011	Al Arabi Kuwait	34	(0)

International career^{‡}
1999–2000	Kuwait	6	(0)
- * Club domestic league appearances and goals as of 1 October 2008 ‡ National team caps and goals as of 29 May 2008

Youssef Al Thuwaney (born August 14, 1977) is a Kuwaiti footballer who played for Al Arabi Kuwait of the Kuwaiti Premier League as a goalkeeper.

He played for Al-Arabi in the 2007 AFC Champions League group stage.
