= Haya Al Shuaibi =

Kuwaiti comedian and actress (born 1979)

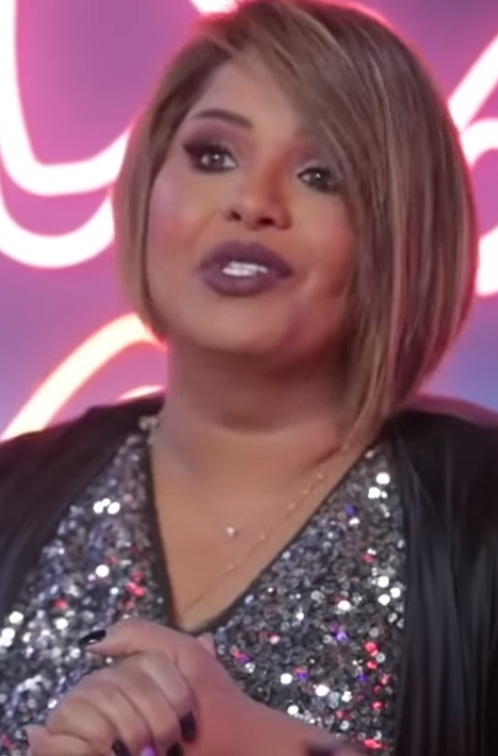
- Born: Haya Jamal Al Shuaibi; 2 January 1981 (age 45); Kuwait City, Kuwait
- Occupation: Actress
- Years active: 1993–present
- Title: Hayoona
- Children: 5

Haya Al Shuaibi (Arabic: هيا الشعيبي; born 2 January 1981) is a Kuwaiti comedian actress.

== Personal life ==
She married twice, and has 3 children in total. She has a son by the first husband, and a son and a daughter to the second husband.
