= Shemayel =

Shemayel شمايل مريم القطان
- Born: Maryam Alqatan; June 28, 1969 (age 56)
- Origin: Kuwait
- Genres: Khaliji, Arabic, Pop
- Occupation: Singer
- Years active: 1998–2004

Maryam Alqatan (Arabic: مريم القطان; born June 28, 1969), better known as Shemayel (Arabic: شمايل), is a retired Kuwaiti singer and actress. She started a singing and acting career in 1998 which continued until 2003, when she became an Islamic preacher.

== Discography ==
- Ya Athabi (English: My Suffering) (1998, alnibras/alkhyol)
- Kaser alzejaj (English: Broke The Glass) (1999, alnibras/alkheyol)
- Katheb o sadeg (English: Lies and Truth) (2000, Rotana)
- Mahad tharbkom ala edekom (English: Nobody Hit Your Hand) (2003, Rotana); Unreleased
