= Nahedh Al-Murdh =

Kuwaiti fencer

Personal information
- Nationality: Kuwait
- Born: 30 March 1970 (age 56)
- Height: 175 cm (5 ft 9 in)
- Weight: 110

Sport
- Country: Kuwait
- Sport: Fencing
- Club: Salmyah
- Coached by: Ali Belhaj

Nahedh Al-Murdh (born 30 March 1970) is a Kuwaiti former fencer. He competed in the team épée event at the 1988 Summer Olympics.
