= Sabah Al-Salim Al-Sabah =

Emir of Kuwait from 1965 to 1977

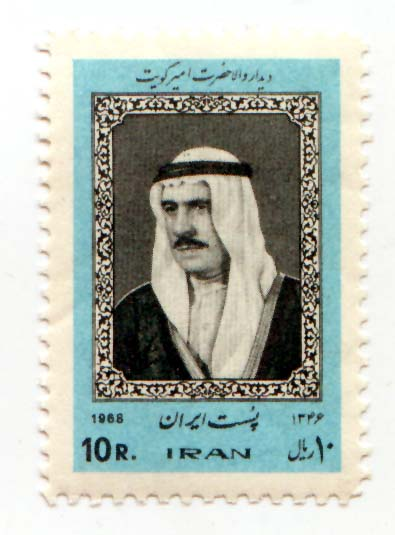
- Sabah Al-Salim Al-Sabah in 1968

Emir of Kuwait
- Reign: 24 November 1965 – 31 December 1977
- Predecessor: Abdullah Al-Salim Al-Sabah
- Successor: Jaber Al-Ahmad Al-Sabah
- Born: 12 April 1913; Kuwait City, Sheikhdom of Kuwait
- Died: 31 December 1977 (aged 64); Kuwait City, Kuwait
- Issue: Salem Sabah Al-Salem Al-Sabah; Ali Sabah Al-Salem Al-Sabah; Mohammad Sabah Al-Salem Al-Sabah; Ahmad; Nuria (wife of Emir Mishal); Hussa Sabah Al-Salem Al-Sabah
- House: Sabah
- Father: Salim Al-Mubarak Al-Sabah
- Mother: Munira Muhammad Al-Dabbous

Sabah Al-Salim Al-Sabah (Arabic: صباح السالم الصباح; 12 April 1913 – 31 December 1977) was the 12th Emir of Kuwait from 1965 to 1977. Prior to his reign he held multiple government positions such as commandant of the town police and prime minister of Kuwait.

== Early life ==
Sabah Al-Salim Al-Sabah was born in 1913 according to the House of Sabah and the British Foreign Office in the 1950s. However, his year of birth was listed as 1915 by the United States Department of State, 1914 by the British Foreign Office in 1963, and 1915 in obituaries published by western media. Sabah believed that he was born in 1915. It is known that he was born before the death of Mubarak Al-Sabah in 1915, as it was Mubarak who selected his name.

Born to Salim Al-Mubarak Al-Sabah and Munirah bint Muhammad bin 'Ali, Sabah was a member of the House of Sabah, which ruled Kuwait since Sabah I bin Jaber in 1752. Sabah was raised by guardians and his mother after his father died in 1921.

H. R. P. Dickson, the British political agent in Kuwait, wrote in Kuwait News in 1930, that Sabah started attending the American University of Beirut in 1930. However, there are no records that Sabah attended the university. His brother Fahd al-Salim, who was also mentioned in the report, did attend the university.

== Government roles ==
=== Kuwait Police ===
Emir Ahmad Al-Jaber Al-Sabah initially appointed Fadh as Commandant of the Town Police in 1938, before appointing Sabah on 1 January 1939. This was the first public office Sabah held. Fadh served as acting commandant when Sabah was absent, such as his Hajj pilgrimage in 1941.

The Kuwait Police was recently formed on 17 August 1938, and had 60 officers at the time of its formation. The division between the police and security forces was ill-defined as both had jurisdiction in the same areas. The size of the police rose to 540 officers by 1953. The British Foreign Office wrote that Sabah was jealous of Abdullah Mubarak Al-Sabah, who led the larger security forces which numbered at 1,200 men.

Sabah worked on improvements to the police after visiting the United Kingdom in 1955; its membership was expanded from 1,000 to 3,000, pay was raised by over 45%, and 2,000 rifles and 200,000 rounds of ammunition were purchased. The budget was doubled from Rs 12 million in 1955 to Rs 25 million in 1956. Egyptian police officers were brought in to reorganise the police in 1955, and divided it into five sections covering morals, traffic, immigration and foreign workers, criminal investigation, and fingerprints. Kuwait City was divided into six districts.

On 8 February 1959, the police and security forces were merged into one department under Abdullah Mubarak. Sabah was appointed as president of the Public Health Department.

=== Prime Minister ===
Sabah went to Baghdad in October 1963, and signed a mutual recognition agreement with Prime Minister Ahmed Hassan al-Bakr, which established the borders between Kuwait and Iraq as defined in 1932.

In December 1964, Sabah formed a new cabinet in which he was acting ruler while Jaber Al-Ahmad Al-Sabah was acting prime minister.

== Reign ==
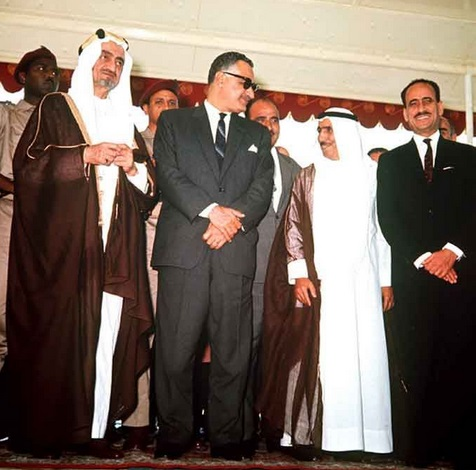
Some of the attending heads of state at the 1967 Arab League Summit. From left to right: King Faisal of Saudi Arabia, President Gamal Abdel Nasser of Egypt, Presented Abdullah Sallal of Yemen, Sabah and President Abd al-Rahman Arif of Iraq, Khartoum on 2 September 1967

Sabah's half-brother Abdullah Al-Salim Al-Sabah became emir in 1950. Abdullah Mubarak and Jaber Al-Ahmad Al-Sabah were the main candidates to succeed Abdullah by 1955. Sabah was appointed Crown Prince on 29 October 1962.

The Malik family were a distant branch of the House of Sabah. Fahd Al-Malik was an associate of King Ibn Saud of Saudi Arabia until moving to Kuwait in 1948. Fahd started claiming land and constructing buildings in the 1950s. The Higher Executive Committee demanded that Fahd declare whether he was Saudi or Kuwaiti. Fahd declared he was Saudi and was ordered to leave by 15 May 1957. The Malik family refused to leave and barricaded themselves into a compound. Abdullah Mubarak bombarded the compound, killing 8 people and injuring 5, and captured 35. Sabah opposed this action and one of his first acts as emir was to pay a state pension to the Malik family and incorporated them into the House of Sabah.

Sabah succeeded Abdullah upon his death in 1965. This was one of the few times that somebody other than the son of the previous ruler ascended to the throne. He suspended parliament in late August 1976 for four years, claiming it was acting against the nation. He was the 12th ruler in the family dynasty.

Naif Hamad Al-Dabbous was granted large tracts of land in southern Kuwait by Sabah.

Sabah visited Washington, D.C. in December 1968, becoming the first leader of Kuwait to visit the White House.

The National Assembly was dissolved by Sabah in 1976, the first time this happened.

Sabah initiated a meeting of the Arab League in Riyadh on 16-18 October 1976, and this meeting rseolved to support a ceasefire in the Lebanese Civil War and to reinforce Arab forces in Lebanon.

== Personal life ==
Sabah married Munirah Fahd Al-Adwani, with whom he had four children, in 1936. He married his first cousin Nuriyyah bint Ahmad Al-Sabah, with whom he had nine children, as his second wife on 24 January 1943.

Sabah went to the American Hospital of Paris after attending the 1967 Arab League summit and discovered that he was suffering from a genito-urinary condition. He suffered from health issues so severe in 1972, that the American Embassy in Kuwait believed that he might abdicate. He died on 30-31 December 1977, after suffering a heart attack. Abdullah Bishara, who met with Sabah two days before his death, noted the yellow pallor of his skin.

== Works cited ==
=== Books ===
- Alebrahim, Abdulrahman (2019). Kuwait's Politics Before Independence: The Role of the Balancing Powers. Gerlach Press. ISBN 9783959940726.
- Jarman, Robert (2002). Sabah al-Salim Al-Sabah: Amir of Kuwait, 1965-77: A Political Biography. London Centre of Arab Studies. ISBN 1900404214.
- Kéchichian, Joseph (2015). Kuwait's Politics Before Independence: The Role of the Balancing Powers. Asan Institute for Policy Studies.

=== Journals ===
- "Documents and Source Material: Arab Documents on Palestine and the Arab-Israeli Conflict". Journal of Palestine Studies. 6 (2). Taylor & Francis: 180–194. 1977. doi:10.2307/2535520. JSTOR 2535520.

Sabah Al-Salim Al-Sabah House of Sabah Born: 1913 Died: 31 December 1977
Regnal titles
Preceded by Abdullah III Al-Salim Al-Sabah	Emir of Kuwait; 1965–1977	Succeeded by Jaber Al-Ahmad Al-Sabah
