= History of Kuwait =

Kuwait is a sovereign state in West Asia located at the head of the Persian Gulf. The geographical region of Kuwait has been occupied by humans since antiquity, particularly due to its strategic location at the head of the Persian Gulf. In the eighteenth and nineteenth centuries, Kuwait contained a prosperous maritime port city known for its regional trade.

== Antiquity ==
=== Mesopotamia ===
Following the post-glacial flooding of the Persian Gulf basin, debris from the Tigris–Euphrates river formed a substantial delta, creating most of the land in present-day Kuwait and establishing the present coastlines. One of the earliest evidence of human habitation in Kuwait dates back to 8000 BC where Mesolithic tools were found in Burgan.

During the Ubaid period (6500 BC), Kuwait was the central site of interaction between the peoples of Mesopotamia and Neolithic Eastern Arabia, including Bahra 1 and site H3 in Subiya. The Neolithic inhabitants of Kuwait were among the world's earliest maritime traders. One of the world's earliest reed-boats was discovered at site H3 dating back to the Ubaid period. Other Neolithic sites in Kuwait are located in Khiran and Sulaibikhat.

Mesopotamians first settled in the Kuwaiti island of Failaka in 2000 B.C. Traders from the Sumerian city of Ur inhabited Failaka and ran a mercantile business. The island had many Mesopotamian-style buildings typical of those found in Iraq dating from around 2000 B.C.

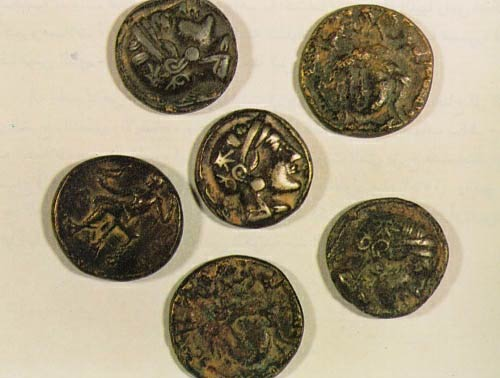
Ancient coins found on Failaka Island.

From 4000 BC until 2000 BC, the bay of Kuwait was home to the Dilmun civilization. At its peak, Dilmun may have included Al-Shadadiya, Akkaz, Umm an Namil, and Failaka.

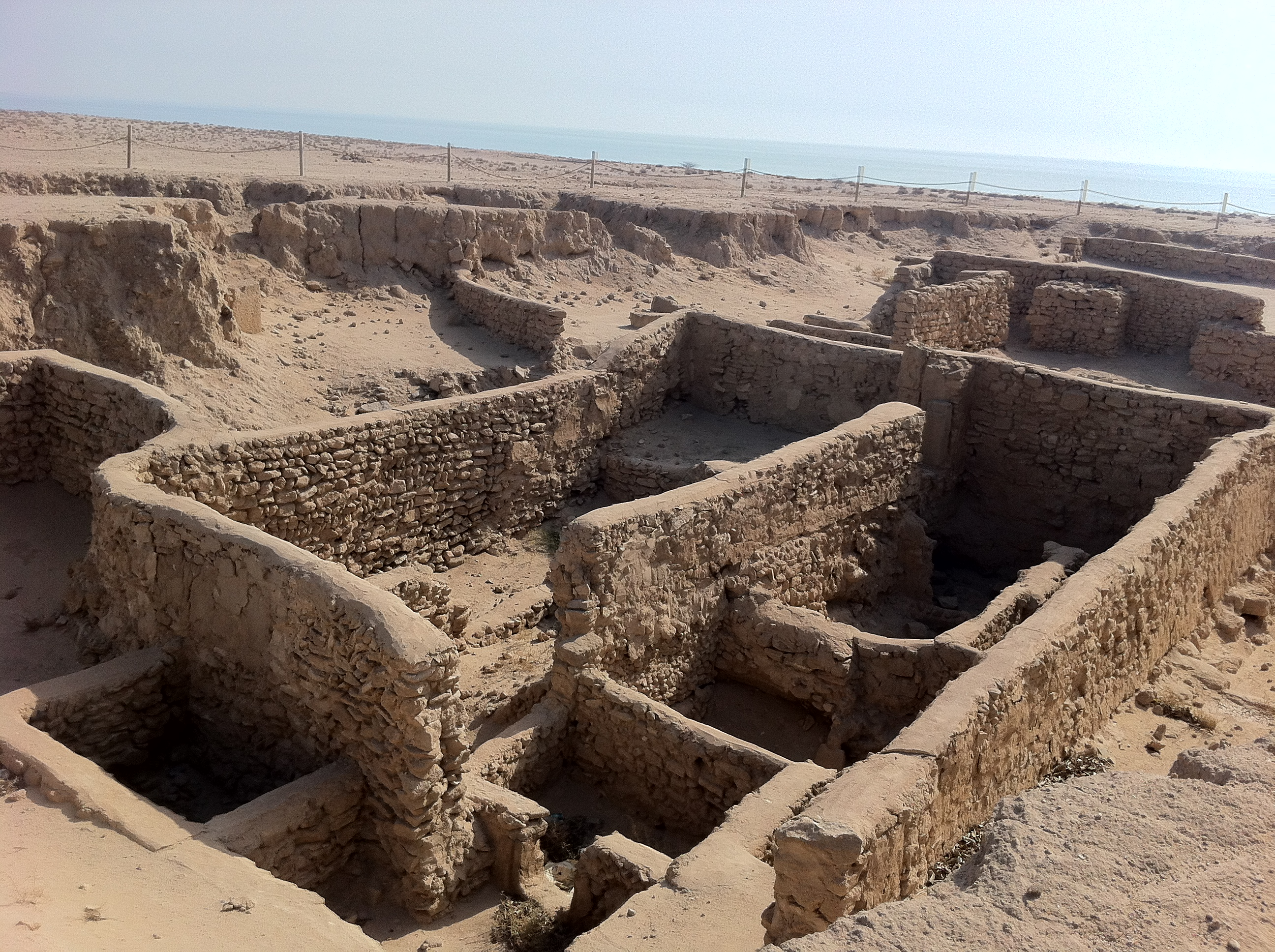
Antiquities

Despite the scholarly consensus that ancient Dilmun encompasses three modern locations — the eastern littoral of Arabia from the vicinity of modern Kuwait to Bahrain; the island of Bahrain; the island of Failaka of Kuwait — few researchers have taken into account the radically different geography of the basin represented by the Persian Gulf before its reflooding as sea levels rose about 6000 BCE.

During the Dilmun era (from ca. 3000 BC), Failaka was known as "Agarum", the land of Enzak, a great god in the Dilmun civilization according to Sumerian cuneiform texts found on the island. During the Neo-Babylonian Period, Enzak was identified with Nabu, the ancient Mesopotamian patron god of literacy, the rational arts, scribes and wisdom. As part of Dilmun, Failaka became a hub for the civilization from the end of the 3rd to the middle of the 1st millennium BC.

After the Dilmun civilization, Failaka was inhabited by the Kassites of Mesopotamia, and was formally under the control of the Kassite dynasty of Babylon. Studies indicate traces of human settlement can be found on Failaka dating back to as early as the end of the 3rd millennium BC, and extending until the 20th century AD. Many of the artifacts found in Falaika are linked to Mesopotamian civilizations and seem to show that Failaka was gradually drawn toward the civilization based in Antioch.

Under Nebuchadnezzar II, the bay of Kuwait was under Babylonian control. Cuneiform documents found in Failaka indicate the presence of Babylonians in the island's population. Babylonian Kings were present in Failaka during the Neo-Babylonian Empire period, Nabonidus had a governor in Failaka and Nebuchadnezzar II had a palace and temple in Falaika. Failaka also contained temples dedicated to the worship of Shamash, the Mesopotamian sun god in the Babylonian pantheon.

Most of present-day Kuwait is still archaeologically unexplored. Although there is no scholarly consensus, several archaeologists and geologists have proposed that Kuwait was likely the original location of the Pishon River which watered the Garden of Eden. Juris Zarins argued that the Garden of Eden was situated at the head of the Persian Gulf (present-day Kuwait), where the Tigris and Euphrates Rivers run into the sea, from his research on this area using information from many different sources, including LANDSAT images from space. His suggestion about the Pishon River was supported by James A. Sauer of the American Center of Oriental Research. Sauer made an argument from geology and history that Pishon River was the now-defunct Kuwait River. With the aid of satellite photos, Farouk El-Baz traced the dry channel from Kuwait up the Wadi al-Batin.

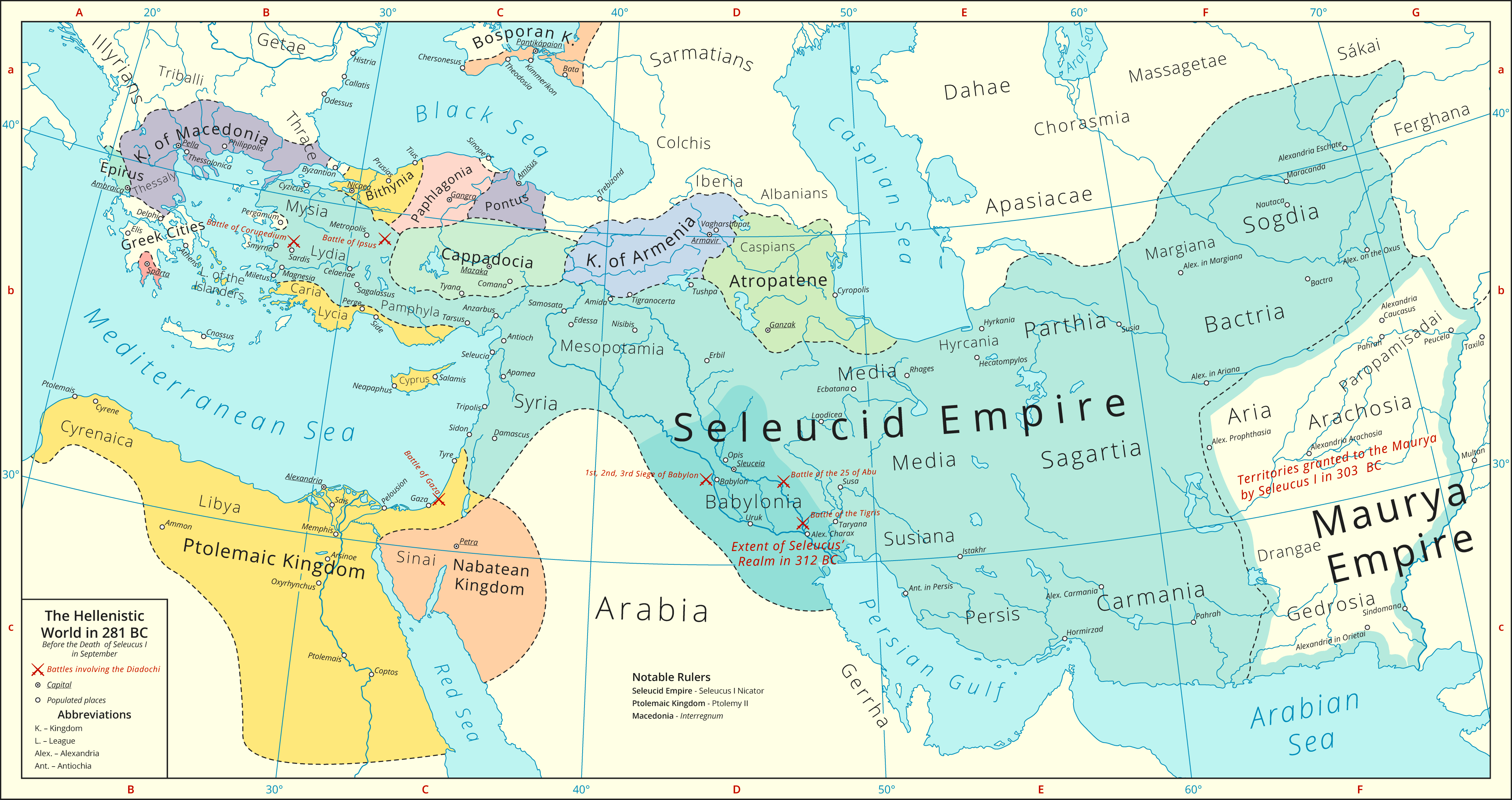
The Seleucid Empire at its greatest extent.

After an apparent abandonment of about seven centuries, the bay of Kuwait was repopulated during the Achaemenid period (c. 550‒330 BC). In 4th century BC, the ancient Greeks colonized the bay of Kuwait under Alexander the Great, the ancient Greeks named mainland Kuwait Larissa and Failaka was named Ikaros.

According to Strabo and Arrian, Alexander the Great named Failaka Ikaros because it resembled the Aegean island of that name in size and shape. Various elements of Greek mythology were mixed with the local cults in Failaka. "Ikaros" was also the name of a prominent city situated in Failaka.

According to another account, having returned from his Indian campaign to Persia, Alexander the Great ordered the island to be called Icarus, after the Icarus island in the Aegean Sea. This was likely a Hellenization of the local name Akar (Aramaic 'KR), derived from the ancient bronze-age toponym Agarum. Another suggestion is that the name Ikaros was influenced by the local É-kara temple, dedicated to the Babylonian sun-god Shamash. That both Failaka and the Aegean Icarus housed bull cults would have made the identification tempting all the more.

During Hellenistic times, there was a temple of Artemis on the island. The wild animals on the island were dedicated to goddess and no one should harm them. Strabo wrote that on the island there was a temple of Apollo and an oracle of Artemis (Tauropolus) (μαντεῖον Ταυροπόλου). The island is also mentioned by Stephanus of Byzantium and Ptolemaeus.

Remains of the settlement include a large Hellenistic fort and two Greek temples. Failaka was also a trading post (emporion) of the kingdom of Characene. Archaeological remains of Greek colonization were also discovered in Akkaz, Umm an Namil, and Subiya. At the Hellenistic fortress in Failaka, pigs represented 20 percent of the total population, but no pig remains were found in nearby Akkaz.

Nearchos was likely the first Greek to have explored Failaka. The island was further visited and inspected by Archias, Androsthenes of Thasos, and Hiero during three exploration expeditions ordered by Alexander the Great during 324 BC. Failaka might have been fortified and settled during the days of Seleucus I or Antiochos I.

At the time of Alexander the Great, the mouth of the Euphrates River was located in northern Kuwait. The Euphrates river flowed directly into the Persian Gulf via Khor Subiya which was a river channel at the time. Failaka was located 15 kilometers from the mouth of the Euphrates river. By the first century BC, the Khor Subiya river channel dried out completely.

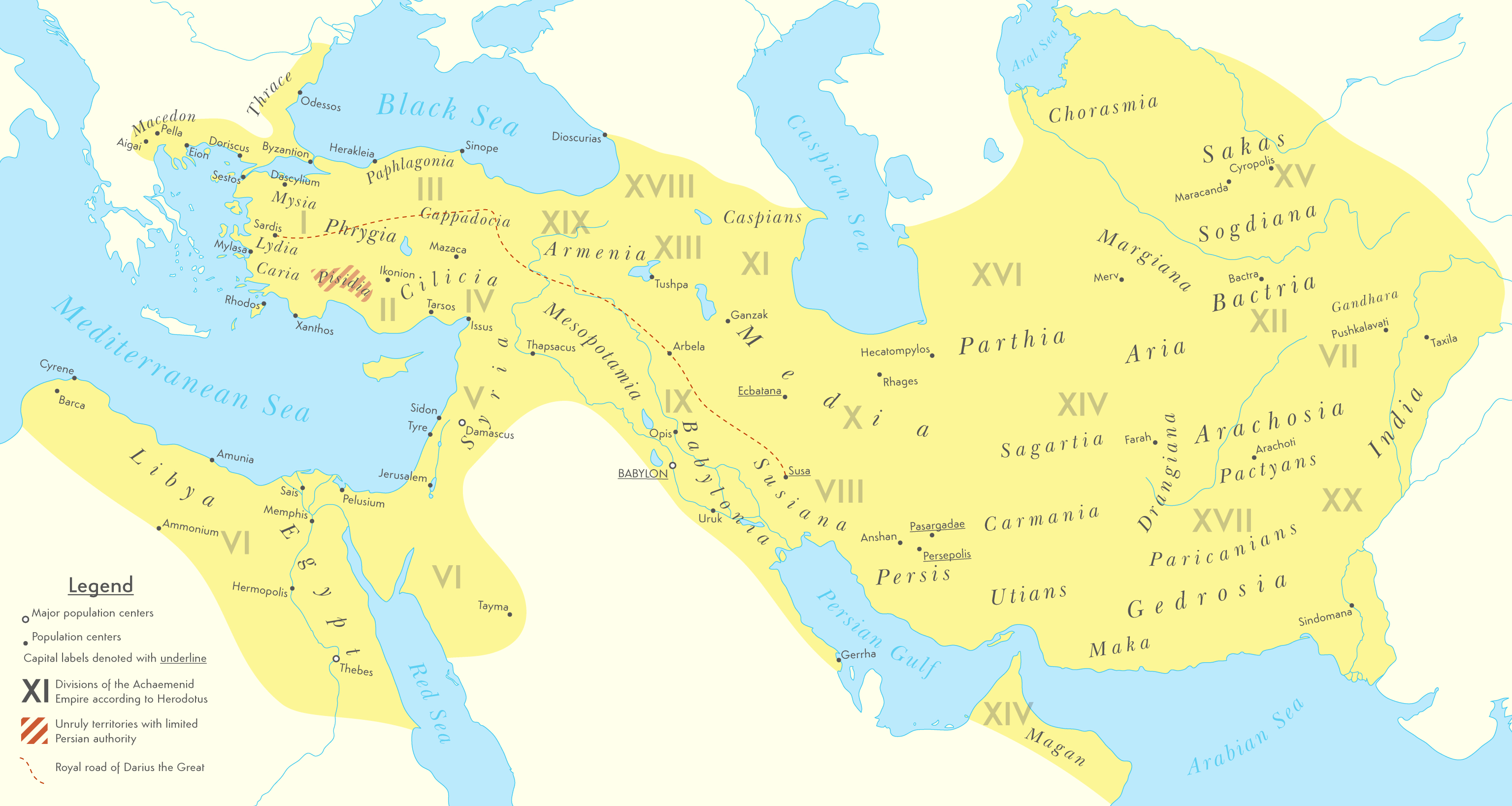
The Achaemenid Empire at its greatest territorial extent.

During the Achaemenid period (c. 550‒330 BC), the bay of Kuwait was repopulated. Failaka was under the control of the Achaemenid Empire as evidenced by the archaeological discovery of Achaemenid strata. There are Aramaic inscriptions that testify Achaemenid presence.

In 127 BC, Kuwait was part of the Parthian Empire and the kingdom of Characene was established around Teredon in present-day Kuwait. Characene was centered in the region encompassing southern Mesopotamia, Characene coins were discovered in Akkaz, Umm an Namil, and Failaka. A busy Parthian era Characene commercial station existed in Kuwait.

The earliest recorded mention of Kuwait was in 150 AD in the geographical treatise Geography by Greek scholar Ptolemy. Ptolemy mentioned the Bay of Kuwait as Hieros Kolpos (Sacer Sinus in the Latin versions).

In 224 AD, Kuwait became part of the Sasanian Empire. At the time of the Sasanian Empire, Kuwait was known as Meshan, which was an alternative name of the kingdom of Characene.

Late Sasanian settlements were discovered in Failaka.

Akkaz was a Partho-Sasanian site; a Zoroastrian Tower of Silence was discovered in northern Akkaz.

In Bubiyan, there is archaeological evidence of Sasanian periods of human presence as evidenced by the recent discovery of torpedo-jar pottery sherds on several prominent beach ridges.

In 636 AD, the Battle of Chains between the Sasanian Empire and Rashidun Caliphate was fought in Kuwait near Kazma. At the time, Kuwait was under the control of the Sasanian Empire. The Battle of Chains was the first battle of the Rashidun Caliphate in which the Muslim army sought to extend its frontiers.

As a result of Rashidun victory in 636 AD, the bay of Kuwait was home to the city of Kazma (also known as "Kadhima" or "Kāzimah") in the early Islamic era. Medieval Arabic sources contain multiple references to the bay of Kuwait in the early Islamic period. The city functioned as a trade port and resting place for pilgrims on their way from Iraq to Hejaz. The city was controlled by the kingdom of Al-Hirah in Iraq. In the early Islamic period, the bay of Kuwait was known for being a fertile area.

Kazma was mainly a stop for caravans coming from Persia and Mesopotamia en route to the Arabian Peninsula. The poet Al-Farazdaq was born in Kazma. Al-Farazdaq is recognized as one of the greatest classical poets of the Arabs.

Early to late Islamic settlements were discovered in Subiya, Akkaz, Kharaib al-Dasht, Umm al-Aish, Al-Rawdatain, Al Qusur, Umm an Namil, Miskan, and Kuwait's side of Wadi al-Batin.

There is archaeological evidence of early Islamic periods of human presence in Bubiyan.

Christian Nestorian settlements flourished in the bay of Kuwait from the 5th century until the 9th century. Excavations have revealed several farms, villages and two large churches dating from the 5th and 6th century. Archaeologists are currently excavating nearby sites to understand the extent of the settlements that flourished in the eighth and ninth centuries A.D. An old island tradition is that a community grew up around a Christian mystic and hermit. The small farms and villages were eventually abandoned. Remains of Byzantine era Nestorian churches were found in Akkaz and Al-Qusur. Pottery at the Al-Qusur site can be dated from as early as the first half of the 7th century through the 9th century.

== Pre-oil history ==
In 1521, Kuwait was under Portuguese control. In the late 16th century, the Portuguese built a defensive settlement in Kuwait. In the early to mid 1700s, Kuwait City was a small fishing village. Administratively, it was a sheikhdom, ruled by local sheikhs from Bani Khalid clan. Sometime in the mid 1700s, the Bani Utbah settled in Kuwait. Sometime after the death of the Bani Khalid's leader Barrak Bin Urair and the fall of the Bani Khalid Emirate, the Utub were able to wrest control of Kuwait as a result of successive matrimonial alliances.

The man chosen was a Sabah, Sabah I bin Jaber. Sabah diplomacy may have also been important with neighbouring clans, especially as Bani Khalid power declined. This selection is usually dated to 1752.

=== Early growth (1760–1899) ===
==== Economy ====
In the latter half of the eighteenth century, Kuwait gradually became a principal commercial center for the transit of goods between India, Muscat, Baghdad, Persia, and Arabia. By the late-1700s, Kuwait had already established itself as a trading route from the Persian Gulf to Aleppo. During the Persian siege of Basra in 1775–1779, Iraqi merchants took refuge in Kuwait and were partly instrumental in the expansion of Kuwait's boatbuilding and trading activities. As a result, Kuwait's maritime commerce boomed.

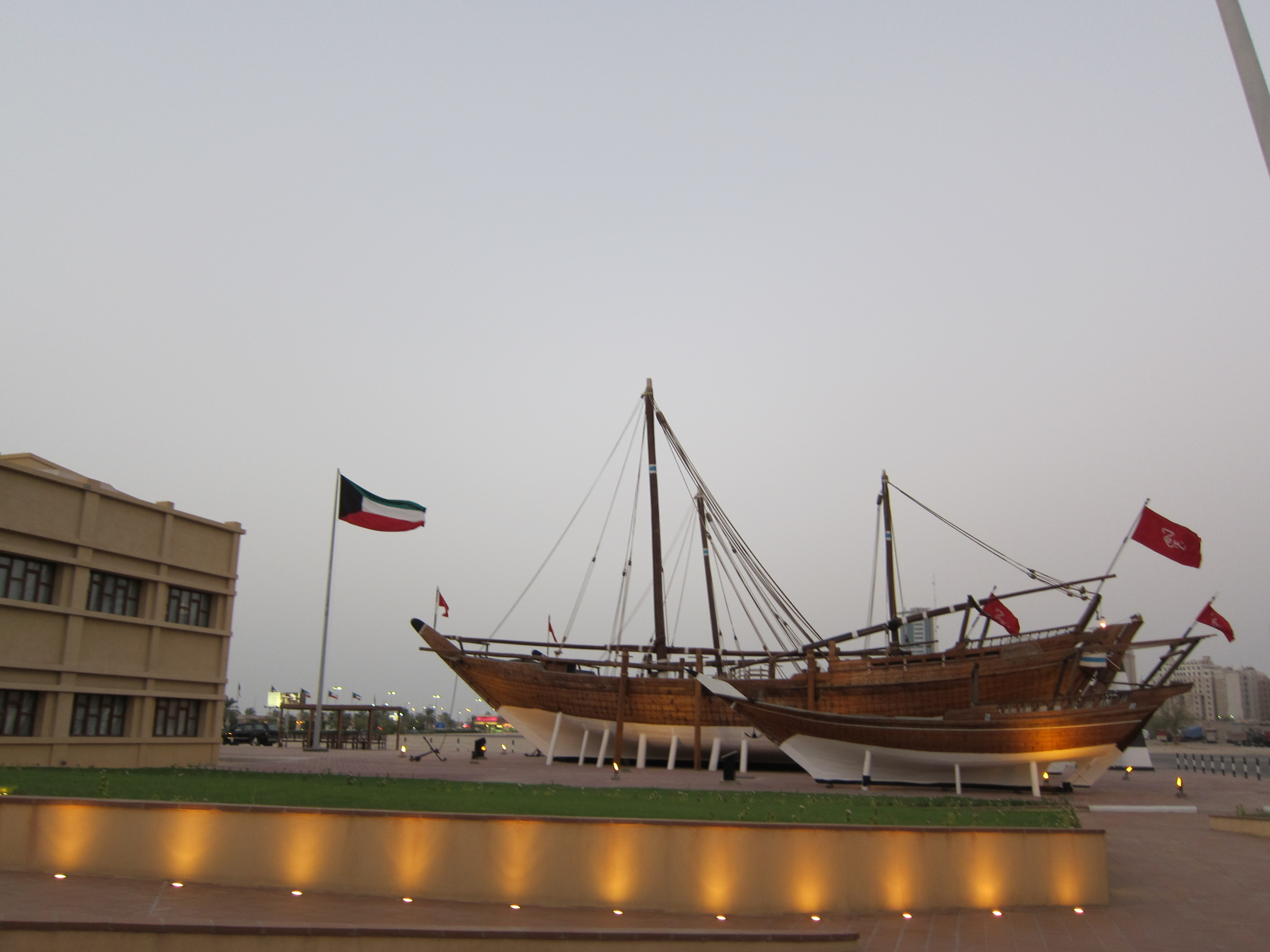
Marine Museum in Kuwait City. Demonstrates the founding of Kuwait as a sea port for merchants.

Between the years 1775 and 1779, the Indian trade routes with Baghdad, Aleppo, Smyrna and Constantinople were diverted to Kuwait. The East India Company was diverted to Kuwait in 1792. The East India Company secured the sea routes between Kuwait, India and the east coasts of Africa. After the Persians withdrew from Basra in 1779, Kuwait continued to attract trade away from Basra. The flight of many of Basra's leading merchants to Kuwait continued to play a significant role in Basra's commercial stagnation well into the 1850s.

Regional geopolitical turbulence helped foster economic prosperity in Kuwait in the second half of the 18th century. Kuwait became prosperous due to Basra's instability in the late 18th century. In the late 18th century, Kuwait partly functioned as a haven for Basra's merchants fleeing Ottoman government persecution.

In 1776, Sabah I died and was succeeded by his youngest son, Abdullah. Shortly before Sabah's death, in 1766, the al-Khalifa and, soon after, the al-Jalahima, left Kuwait en masse for Zubarah in Qatar. Domestically, the al-Khalifa and al-Jalahima had been among the top contenders for power. Their emigration left the Sabahs in undisputed control, and by the end of Abdullah I's long rule (1776–1814), Sabah rule was secure, and the political hierarchy in Kuwait was well established, the merchants deferring to direct orders from the Shaikh. By the 19th century, not only was the ruling Sabah much stronger than a desert Shaikh but also capable of naming his son successor. This influence was not just internal but enabled the al-Sabah to conduct foreign diplomacy. They soon established good relations with the British East India Company in 1775.

Kuwait was the center of boat building in the Persian Gulf region. Kuwaiti ship vessels were renowned throughout the Indian Ocean. Its sailors developed a positive reputation in the Persian Gulf. In the 19th century, Kuwait became significant in the horse trade, horses were regularly shipped by the way of sailing boats from Kuwait. In the mid 19th century, it was estimated that Kuwait was exporting an average of 800 horses to India annually.

==== Assassination of Muhammad Bin Sabah ====
In the 1870s, Ottoman officials were reasserting their presence in the Persian Gulf, with a military intervention in 1871—which was not effectively pursued—where family rivalries in Kuwait were breeding chaos. The Ottomans were bankrupt and when the European banks took control of the Ottoman budget in 1881, additional income was required from Kuwait. Midhat Pasha, the governor of Iraq, demanded that Kuwait submit financially to Ottoman rule. The al-Sabah found diplomatic allies in the British Foreign Office. However, under Abdullah II Al-Sabah, Kuwait pursued a general pro-Ottoman foreign policy, formally taking the title of Ottoman provincial governor, this relationship with the Ottoman Empire did result in Ottoman interference with Kuwaiti laws and selection or rulers.

In May 1896, Shaikh Muhammad Al-Sabah was assassinated by his half-brother, Mubarak, who, in early 1897, was recognized, by the Ottoman sultan, as the qaimmaqam (provincial sub-governor) of Kuwait.

==== Mubarak the Great ====
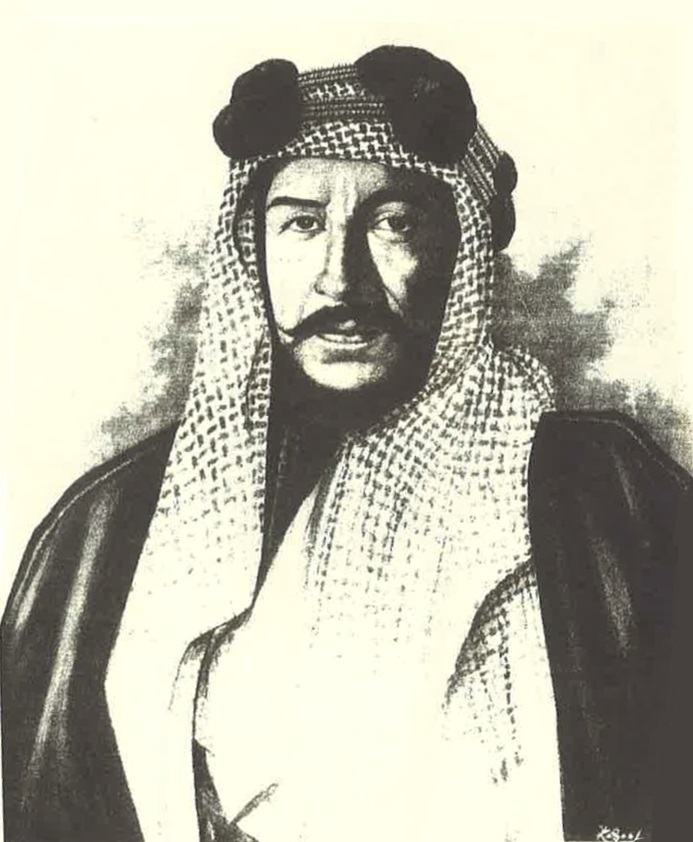
Mubarak Al-Sabah "the Great" (1837–1915)

Mubarak's seizure of the throne via murder left his brother's former allies as a threat to his rule, especially as his opponents gained the backing of the Ottomans. In July, Mubarak invited the British to deploy gunboats along the Kuwaiti coast. Britain saw Mubarak's desire for an alliance as an opportunity to counteract German influence in the region and so agreed. This led to what is known as the First Kuwaiti Crisis, in which the Ottomans demanded that the British stop interfering with their empire. In the end, the Ottoman Empire backed down, rather than go to war.

In January 1899, Mubarak signed an agreement with the British which pledged that Kuwait would never cede any territory nor receive agents or representatives of any foreign power without the British Government's consent. In essence, this policy gave Britain control of Kuwait's foreign policy. The treaty also gave Britain responsibility for Kuwait's national security. In return, Britain agreed to grant an annual subsidy of 15,000 Indian rupees (£1,500) to the ruling family. In 1911, Mubarak raised taxes. Therefore, three wealthy business men Ibrahim Al-Mudhaf, Helal Al-Mutairi, and Shamlan Ali bin Saif Al-Roumi (brother of Hussain Ali bin Saif Al-Roumi), led a protest against Mubarak by making Bahrain their main trade point, which negatively affected the Kuwaiti economy. However, Mubarak went to Bahrain and apologized for raising taxes and the three business men returned to Kuwait. In 1915, Mubarak the Great died and was succeeded by his son Jaber II Al-Sabah, who reigned for just over one year until his death in early 1917. His brother Sheikh Salim Al-Mubarak Al-Sabah succeeded him.

During the reign of Mubarak, Kuwait was dubbed the "Marseille of the Persian Gulf" because its economic vitality attracted a large variety of people. The population was cosmopolitan and ethnically diverse, including Arabs, Persians, Africans, Jews, and Armenians. Kuwait was known for its religious tolerance.

In the first decades of the twentieth century, Kuwait had a well-established elite: wealthy trading families who were linked by marriage and shared economic interests. The elite were long-settled, urban, Sunni families, the majority of which claim descent from the original 30 Bani Utubi families. The wealthiest families were trade merchants who acquired their wealth from long-distance commerce, shipbuilding and pearling. They were a cosmopolitan elite, they traveled extensively to India, Africa and Europe. The elite educated their sons abroad more than other Gulf Arab elite. Western visitors noted that Kuwait's elite used European office systems, typewriters and followed European culture with curiosity. The richest families were involved in general trade. The merchant families of Al-Ghanim and Al-Hamad were estimated to be worth millions before the 1940s.

=== Anglo-Ottoman convention (1913) ===
Informal negotiations began on 29 July 1911 in a British memorandum sent to the Ottoman Government. By this time, it seemed likely that the terminus for the German funded and engineered Berlin–Baghdad railway would be situated in Kuwait. Kuwait had been under Ottoman administration since 1871 and in 1875 was included in the Basra Vilayet. Although the sheikhdom now fell under the Empire's jurisdiction, no Ottoman official was stationed in Kuwait. Influence over Kuwait was crucial to British foreign policy in the Persian Gulf with regard to commerce and strategic interests concerning India.

In the Anglo-Ottoman Convention of 1913, the British concurred with the Ottoman Empire in defining Kuwait as an autonomous kaza of the Ottoman Empire and that the Shaikhs of Kuwait were not independent leaders, but rather qaimmaqams (provincial sub-governors) of the Ottoman government.

The convention ruled that Sheikh Mubarak had authority over an area extending out to a radius of 80 km, from the capital. This region was marked by a red circle and included the islands of Auhah, Bubiyan, Failaka, Kubbar, Mashian, and Warbah. A green circle designated an area extending out an additional 100 km, in radius, within which the qaimmaqam was authorized to collect tribute and taxes from the natives.

World War I disrupted elements of Kuwait's politics, society, economy and trans-regional networks.

=== Mesopotamian Campaign (1914) ===
On 6 November 1914, British offensive action began with the naval bombardment of the old fort at Fao in Iraq, located at the point where the Shatt-al-Arab meets the Persian Gulf. At the Fao Landing, the British Indian Expeditionary Force D (IEF D), comprising the 6th (Poona) Division led by Lieutenant General Arthur Barrett with Sir Percy Cox as Political Officer, was opposed by 350 Ottoman troops and 4 guns. After a sharp engagement, the fort was overrun. By mid-November the Poona Division was fully ashore and began moving towards the city of Basra.

The same month, the ruler of Kuwait, Sheikh Mubarak Al-Sabah, contributed to the Allied war effort by sending forces to attack Ottoman troops at Umm Qasr, Safwan, Bubiyan, and Basra. In exchange the British government recognised Kuwait as an "independent government under British protection." There is no report on the exact size and nature of Mubarak's attack, though Ottoman forces did retreat from those positions weeks later. Mubarak soon removed the Ottoman symbol from the Kuwaiti flag and replaced it with "Kuwait" written in Arabic script. Mubarak's participation and previous exploits in obstructing the completion of the Baghdad railway helped the British safeguard the Persian Gulf by preventing Ottoman and German reinforcement. He refused to rent any storage facilities to the Germans.

=== Kuwait–Najd War (1919–21) ===
The Kuwait-Najd War erupted in the aftermath of World War I, when the Ottoman Empire was defeated and the British invalidated the Anglo-Ottoman Convention. The power vacuum, left by the fall of the Ottomans, sharpened the conflict between Kuwait and Najd (Ikhwan). The war resulted in sporadic border clashes throughout 1919–20.

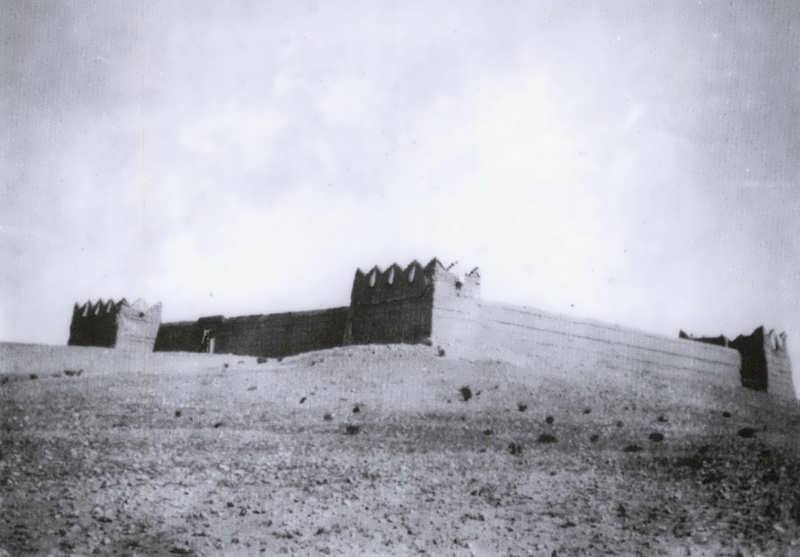
Kuwait Red Fort.

However, Kuwait immensely declined in regional economic importance, mainly due to various trade blockades and the world economic depression. The Great Depression negatively impacted Kuwait's economy starting in the late 1920s. International trading was one of Kuwait's main sources of income before oil. Kuwaiti merchants were mostly intermediary merchants. As a result of European decline of demand for goods from India and Africa, the economy of Kuwait suffered. The decline in international trade resulted in an increase in gold smuggling by Kuwaiti ships to India. Some Kuwaiti merchant families became rich due to gold smuggling to India.

Kuwait's pearling industry also collapsed as a result of the worldwide economic depression. At its height, Kuwait's pearling industry led the world's luxury market, regularly sending out between 750 and 800 ship vessels to meet the European elite's need for luxuries pearls. During the economic depression, luxuries like pearls were in little demand. The Japanese invention of cultured pearls also contributed to the collapse of Kuwait's pearling industry.

==== Battle of Jahra ====
The Battle of Jahra was a battle during the Kuwait-Najd War. The battle took place in Al Jahra, west of Kuwait City on 10 October 1920 between Salim Al-Mubarak Al-Sabah ruler of Kuwait and Ikhwan Wahhabi followers of Ibn Saud of Saudi Arabia, king of Saudi Arabia.

A force of 4,000 Saudi Ikhwan, led by Faisal Al-Dawish, attacked the Kuwait Red Fort at Al-Jahra, defended by 2,000 Kuwaiti men. The Kuwaitis were largely outnumbered by the Ikhwan of Najd.

==== Sheikh Khaz'al turns down the throne of Kuwait ====
When Percy Cox was informed of the border clashes in Kuwait, he sent a letter to Mohammerah Sheikh Khazʽal Ibn Jabir offering the Kuwaiti throne to either him or one of his heirs, thinking Khaz'al would be a more competent ruler the Al Sabah family. Khaz'al, who considered the Al Sabah as his own family, replied "Do you expect me to allow the stepping down of Al Mubarak from the throne of Kuwait? Do you think I can accept this?" He then asked:

...even so, do you think that you have come to me with something new? Al Mubarak's position as ruler of Kuwait means that I am the true ruler of Kuwait. So there is no difference between myself and them, for they are like the dearest of my children and you are aware of this. Had someone else come to me with this offer, I would have complained about them to you. So how do you come to me with this offer when you are well aware that myself and Al Mubarak are one soul and one house, what affects them affects me, whether good or evil.

Ibn Saud imposed a tight trade blockade against Kuwait from the years 1923 until 1937. The goal of the Saudi economic and military attacks on Kuwait was to annex as much of Kuwait's territory as possible.

=== The Uqair protocol ===
The British High Commissioner in Baghdad, Percy Cox, imposed the Uqair Protocol of 1922 which defined the boundaries between Iraq, Kuwait and Nejd. In April 1923, Shaikh Ahmad al-Sabah wrote the British Political Agent in Kuwait, Major John More, "I still do not know what the border between Iraq and Kuwait is, I shall be glad if you will kindly give me this information." More, upon learning that al-Sabah claimed the outer green line of the Anglo-Ottoman Convention (4 April), would relay the information to Sir Percy.

On 19 April, Sir Percy stated that the British government recognized the outer line of the convention as the border between Iraq and Kuwait. This decision limited Iraq's access to the Persian Gulf at 58 km of mostly marshy and swampy coastline. As this would make it difficult for Iraq to become a naval power (the territory did not include any deepwater harbours), the Iraqi King Faisal I (whom the British installed as a puppet king in Iraq) did not agree to the plan. However, as his country was under British mandate, he had little say in the matter. Iraq and Kuwait would formally ratify the border in August. The border was re-recognized in 1932.

Attempts by Faisal I to build an Iraqi railway to Kuwait and port facilities on the Gulf were rejected by Britain. These and other similar British colonial policies made Kuwait a focus of the Arab national movement in Iraq, and a symbol of Iraqi humiliation at the hands of the British.

Kuwait's border was revisited by a memorandum sent by the British high commissioner for Iraq in 1923, which became the basis for Kuwait's northern border. In Iraq's 1932 application to the League of Nations it included information about its borders, including its border with Kuwait, where it accepted the boundary established in 1923.

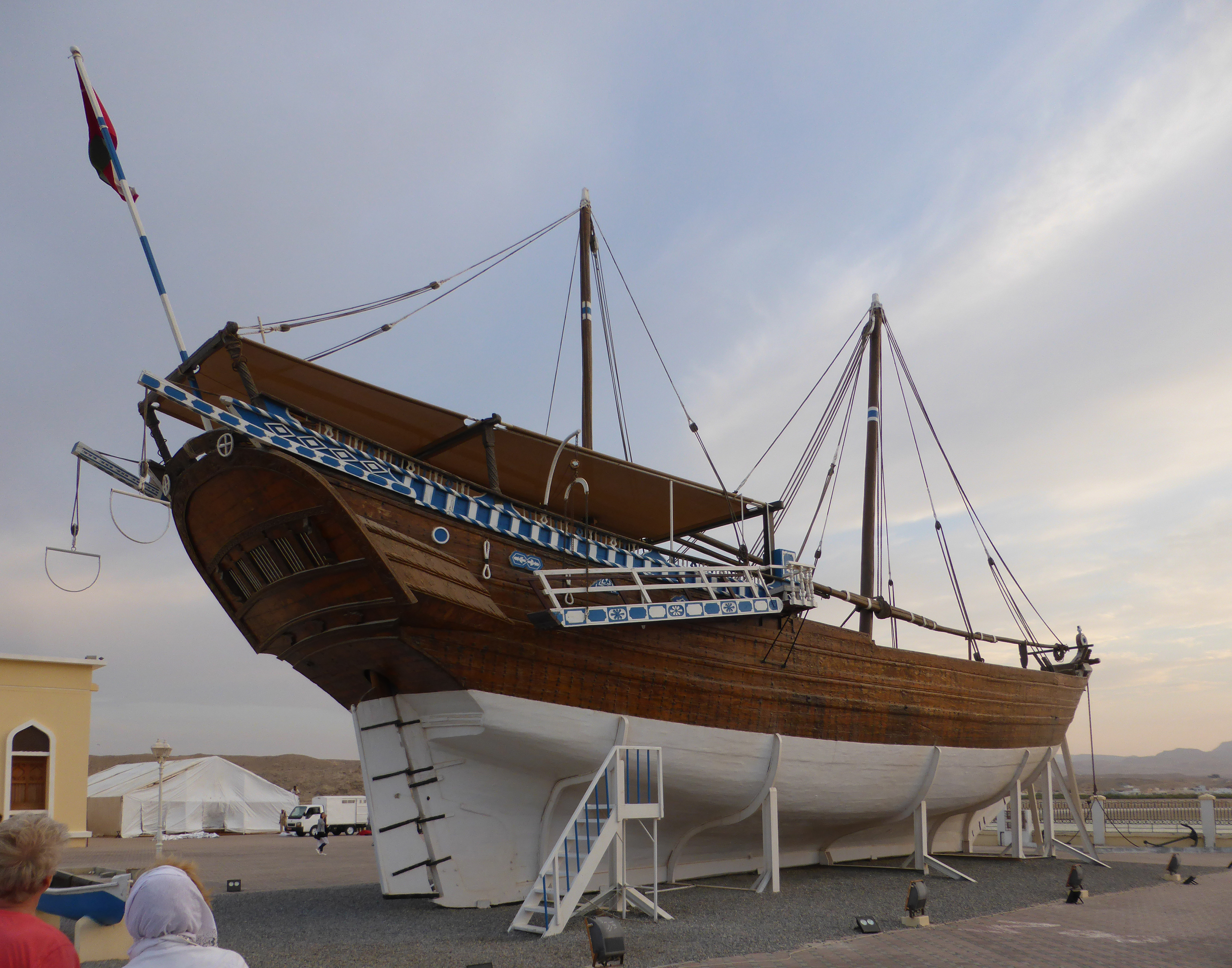
Fateh Al-Khayr is a museum ship in Kuwait. The ship was built in 1938.

After the Uqair conference, Kuwait was still subjected to a Saudi economic blockade and intermittent Saudi raiding. Some merchant families left Kuwait in the early 1930s due to the prevalence of economic hardship. At the time of the discovery of oil in 1937, most of Kuwait's inhabitants were impoverished. Merchants had the most economic power. Al Sabah family rule remained limited until well into the 1930s because the merchants, owing to their financial power, were the primary sources of income in Kuwait. The inauguration of the oil era freed the rulers from their financial dependency on merchant wealth.

Before Mary Bruins Allison visited Kuwait in 1934, Kuwait had already lost its prominence in long-distance trade. During World War I, the British Empire imposed a trade blockade against Kuwait because Kuwait's ruler supported the Ottoman Empire. The British economic blockade heavily damaged Kuwait's economy.

In 1937, Freya Stark wrote about the extent of poverty in Kuwait at the time:

Poverty has settled in Kuwait more heavily since my last visit five years ago, both by sea, where the pearl trade continues to decline, and by land, where the blockade established by Saudi Arabia now harms the merchants.

Al Sabah became Kuwait's dynastic monarchy in 1938. One tradition has it that political power went to the Sabahs as part of an explicit agreement; merchant families focused on the trade while the House of Sabah and other notable Kuwaiti families provided protection of the city housed within Kuwait's wall.

== Modern era ==
=== Independence and early state-building (1946–89) ===
Between 1946 and 1982, Kuwait experienced a period of prosperity driven by oil and its liberal cultural atmosphere; this period is called the "golden era". In 1946, crude oil was exported for the first time. In 1950, a major public-work programme allowed Kuwaitis to enjoy a modern standard of living. By 1952, the country became the largest oil exporter in the Persian Gulf. This massive growth attracted many foreign workers, especially from Palestine, Egypt, Iran, and India.

In June 1961, Kuwait became independent with the end of the British protectorate and the sheikh Abdullah Al-Salim Al-Sabah became an Emir. Under the terms of the newly drafted constitution, Kuwait held its first parliamentary elections in 1963. Kuwait was the first Arab state in the Persian Gulf to establish a constitution and parliament.

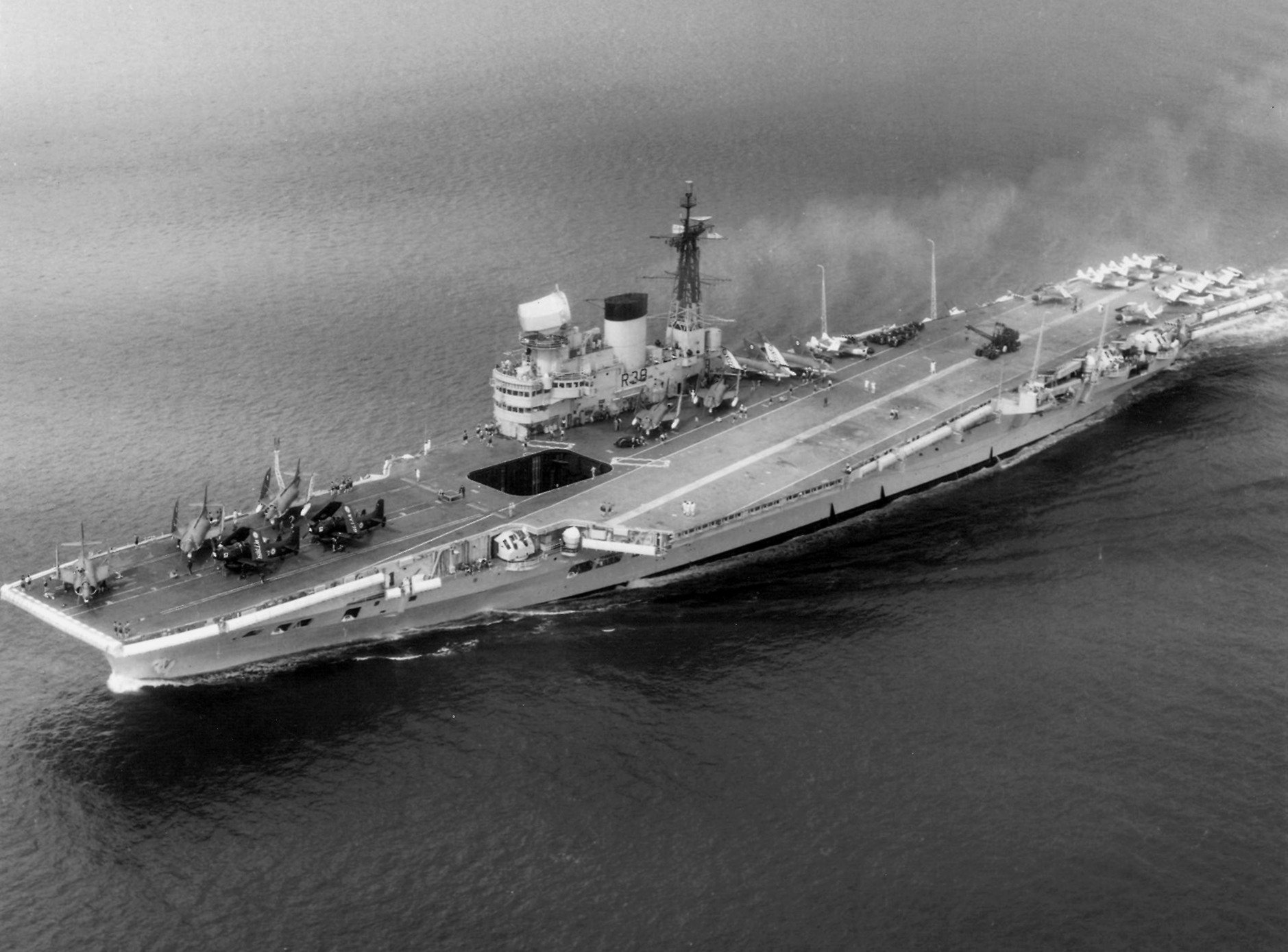
HMS Victorious taking part in Operation Vantage in July 1961

Although Kuwait formally gained independence in 1961, Iraq initially refused to recognize the country's independence by maintaining that Kuwait is part of Iraq, albeit Iraq later briefly backed down following a show of force by Britain and Arab League support of Kuwait's independence. The short-lived Operation Vantage crisis evolved in July 1961, as the Iraqi government threatened to invade Kuwait and the invasion was finally averted following plans by the Arab League to form an international Arab force against the potential Iraqi invasion of Kuwait. As a result of Operation Vantage, the Arab League took over the border security of Kuwait and the British had withdrawn their forces by 19 October. Iraqi prime minister Abd al-Karim Qasim was killed in a coup in 1963 but, although Iraq recognised Kuwaiti independence and the military threat was perceived to be reduced, Britain continued to monitor the situation and kept forces available to protect Kuwait until 1971. There had been no Iraqi military action against Kuwait at the time: this was attributed to the political and military situation within Iraq which continued to be unstable. A treaty of friendship between Iraq and Kuwait was signed in 1963 by which Iraq recognised the 1932 border of Kuwait. The Kuwait-Iraq 1973 Sanita border skirmish evolved on 20 March 1973, when Iraqi army units occupied El-Samitah near the Kuwaiti border, which evoked an international crisis.

On 6 February 1974, Palestinian militants occupied the Japanese embassy in Kuwait, taking the ambassador and ten others hostage. The militants' motive was to support the Japanese Red Army members and Palestinian militants who were holding hostages on a Singaporean ferry in what is known as the Laju incident. Ultimately, the hostages were released, and the guerrillas allowed to fly to Aden. This was the first time Palestinian guerrillas struck in Kuwait as the Al Sabah ruling family, headed by Sheikh Sabah Al-Salim Al-Sabah, funded the Palestinian resistance movement. Kuwait had been a regular endpoint for Palestinian plane hijacking in the past and had considered itself safe.

In the 1960s and 1970s, Kuwait was the most developed country in the region. Kuwait was first Middle East country to diversify its revenue away from oil exports, establishing the Kuwait Investment Authority as the world's first sovereign wealth fund. From the 1970s onward, Kuwait scored highest of all Arab countries on the Human Development Index, and Kuwait University, founded in 1966, attracted students from neighboring countries. Kuwait's theatre industry was renowned throughout the Arab world.

At the time, Kuwait's press was described as one of the freest in the world. Kuwait was the pioneer in the literary renaissance in the Arab region. In 1958, Al Arabi magazine was first published, the magazine went on to become the most popular magazine in the Arab world. Additionally, Kuwait became a haven for writers and journalists in the region, and many, like the Iraqi poet Ahmed Matar, moved to Kuwait for its strong freedom of expression laws, which surpassed those of any other country in the region.

Kuwaiti society embraced liberal and Western attitudes throughout the 1960s and 1970s. Most Kuwaiti women did not wear the hijab in the 1960s and 1970s. At Kuwait University, mini-skirts were more common than the hijab.

Oil and the social structure of Kuwait were closely interlinked. According to an authoritative of the region such a structure resembled a form of "new slavery" with a "viciously reactionary character". 90 per cent of the capital generated from oil for investment abroad was concentrated in the hands of eighteen families. The manual as well as a significant section of the managerial workforce was predominantly foreign, mainly Palestinians who were denied Kuwaiti citizenship. Major investment was made into developing new architectural projects reflecting a new liberal economy whilst advancing passive cooling and attempts at weaving in local styles and decoration.

In August 1976, in reaction to heightened assembly opposition to his policies, the emir suspended four articles of the constitution concerned with political and civil rights (freedom of the press and dissolution of the legislature) and the assembly itself. In 1980, however, the suspended articles of the constitution were reinstated along with the National Assembly. In 1982 the government submitted sixteen constitutional amendments that, among other things, would have allowed the emir to declare martial law for an extended period and would have increased both the size of the legislature and the length of terms of office. In May 1983, the proposals were formally dropped after several months of debate. Nonetheless, the issue of constitutional revisions continued as a topic of discussion in both the National Assembly and the palace.

In the early 1980s, Kuwait experienced a major economic crisis after the Souk Al-Manakh stock market crash and decrease in oil price.

During the Iran–Iraq War, Kuwait ardently supported Iraq. As a result, there were various pro-Iran terror attacks across Kuwait, including the 1983 bombings, the attempted assassination of Emir Jaber in May 1985, the 1985 Kuwait City bombings, and the hijacking of several Kuwait Airways planes. Kuwait's economy and scientific research sector significantly suffered due to the pro-Iran terror attacks.

In 1986, the constitution was again suspended, along with the National Assembly. As with the previous suspension, popular opposition to this move emerged; indeed, the prodemocracy movement of 1989-90 took its name, the Constitutional Movement, from the demand for a return to constitutional life.

After the Iran–Iraq War ended, Kuwait declined an Iraqi request to forgive its US$65 billion debt. An economic rivalry between the two countries ensued after Kuwait increased its oil production by 40 percent.

The Iraq–Kuwait dispute also involved historical claims to Kuwait's territory. Kuwait had been a part of the Ottoman Empire's province of Basra, something that Iraq said made Kuwait rightful Iraqi territory. Kuwait's ruling dynasty, the Al Sabah family, had concluded a protectorate agreement in 1899 that assigned responsibility for Kuwait's foreign affairs to the United Kingdom. The UK drew the border between Kuwait and Iraq in 1922, making Iraq almost entirely landlocked by limiting its access to the Persian Gulf coastline. Kuwait rejected Iraq's attempts to secure further coastline provisions in the region. Iraq accused Kuwait of exceeding its OPEC quotas for oil production. In order for the cartel to maintain its desired price of $18 per barrel, discipline was required. Kuwait was consistently overproducing; in part to repair infrastructure losses caused by the Iran–Iraq War attacks on Kuwait and to pay for the losses of economic scandals. The result was a slump in the oil price – as low as $10 per barrel ($63/m^{3}) – with a resulting loss of $7 billion a year to Iraq, equal to its 1989 balance of payments deficit. Resulting revenues struggled to support the government's basic costs, let alone repair Iraq's damaged infrastructure. Iraq looked for more discipline, with little success. The Iraqi government described it as a form of economic warfare, which it claimed was aggravated by Kuwait slant-drilling across the border into Iraq's Rumaila oil field. At the same time, Saddam looked for closer ties with those Arab states that had supported Iraq in the war. This move was supported by the US, who believed that Iraqi ties with pro-Western Gulf states would help bring and maintain Iraq inside the US' sphere of influence.

In 1989, it appeared that Iraq–Kuwait relations, strong during the war, would be maintained. A pact of non-interference and non-aggression was signed between the countries, followed by a Kuwaiti-Iraqi deal for Iraq to supply Kuwait with water for drinking and irrigation, although a request for Kuwait to lease Iraq Umm Qasr was rejected. GCC-backed development projects were hampered by Iraq's large debts, even with the demobilization of 200,000 soldiers. Iraq also looked to increase arms production so as to become an exporter, although the success of these projects was also restrained by Iraq's obligations; in Iraq, resentment to OPEC's controls mounted.

Iraq's relations with its other Arab neighbors were degraded by mounting violence in Iraq against expatriate groups, who were well-employed during the war, by unemployed Iraqis, among them demobilized soldiers. These events drew little notice outside the Arab world because of fast-moving events directly related to the fall of Communism in Eastern Europe. However, the US did begin to condemn Iraq's human rights record, including the well-known use of torture. The UK also condemned the execution of Farzad Bazoft, a journalist working for the British newspaper The Observer. Following Saddam's declaration that "binary chemical weapons" would be used on Israel if it used military force against Iraq, Washington halted part of its funding. A UN mission to the Israeli-occupied territories, where riots had resulted in Palestinian deaths, was vetoed by the US, making Iraq deeply skeptical of US foreign policy aims in the region, combined with the reliance of the US on Middle Eastern energy reserves.

=== Gulf War (1990–91) ===
Tensions increased further in summer 1990, after Iraq complained to OPEC claiming that Kuwait was stealing its oil from a field near the border by slant drilling of the Rumaila field. In early July 1990, Iraq complained about Kuwait's behavior, such as not respecting their quota, and openly threatened to take military action. On the 23rd, the CIA reported that Iraq had moved 30,000 troops to the Iraq-Kuwait border, and the US naval fleet in the Persian Gulf was placed on alert. Saddam believed an anti-Iraq conspiracy was developing – Kuwait had begun talks with Iran, and Iraq's rival Syria had arranged a visit to Egypt. Upon review by the Secretary of Defense, it was found that Syria indeed planned a strike against Iraq in the coming days. Saddam immediately used funding to incorporate central intelligence into Syria and ultimately prevented the impending air strike. On 15 July 1990, Saddam's government laid out its combined objections to the Arab League, including that policy moves were costing Iraq $1 billion a year, that Kuwait was still using the Rumaila oil field, that loans made by the UAE and Kuwait could not be considered debts to its "Arab brothers". He threatened force against Kuwait and the UAE, saying: "The policies of some Arab rulers are American ... They are inspired by America to undermine Arab interests and security." The US sent aerial refuelling planes and combat ships to the Persian Gulf in response to these threats. Discussions in Jeddah mediated on the Arab League's behalf by Egyptian president Hosni Mubarak, were held on 31 July and led Mubarak to believe that a peaceful course could be established.

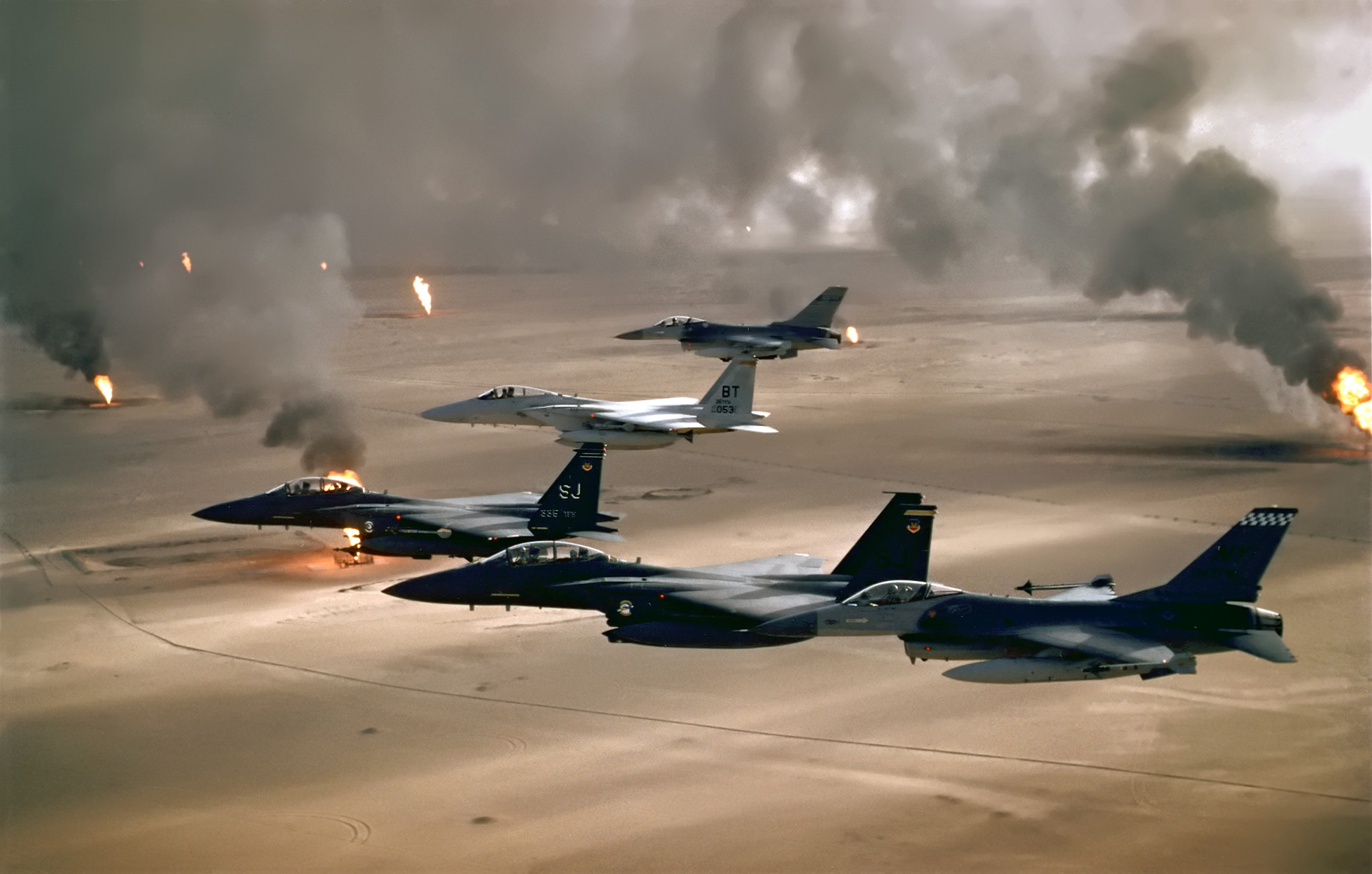
US and UK jet fighters flying over Kuwait, 1991

On the 25th, Saddam met with April Glaspie, the US Ambassador to Iraq, in Baghdad. The Iraqi leader attacked American policy with regards to Kuwait and the UAE:

So what can it mean when America says it will now protect its friends? It can only mean prejudice against Iraq. This stance plus maneuvers and statements which have been made has encouraged the UAE and Kuwait to disregard Iraqi rights ... If you use pressure, we will deploy pressure and force. We know that you can harm us although we do not threaten you. But we too can harm you. Everyone can cause harm according to their ability and their size. We cannot come all the way to you in the United States, but individual Arabs may reach you ... We do not place America among the enemies. We place it where we want our friends to be and we try to be friends. But repeated American statements last year made it apparent that America did not regard us as friends.

Glaspie replied:

I know you need funds. We understand that and our opinion is that you should have the opportunity to rebuild your country. But we have no opinion on the Arab-Arab conflicts, like your border disagreement with Kuwait ... Frankly, we can only see that you have deployed massive troops in the south. Normally that would not be any of our business. But when this happens in the context of what you said on your national day, then when we read the details in the two letters of the Foreign Minister, then when we see the Iraqi point of view that the measures taken by the UAE and Kuwait is, in the final analysis, parallel to military aggression against Iraq, then it would be reasonable for me to be concerned.

Saddam stated that he would attempt last-ditch negotiations with the Kuwaitis but Iraq "would not accept death".

According to Glaspie's own account, she stated in reference to the precise border between Kuwait and Iraq. Glaspie similarly believed that war was not imminent.

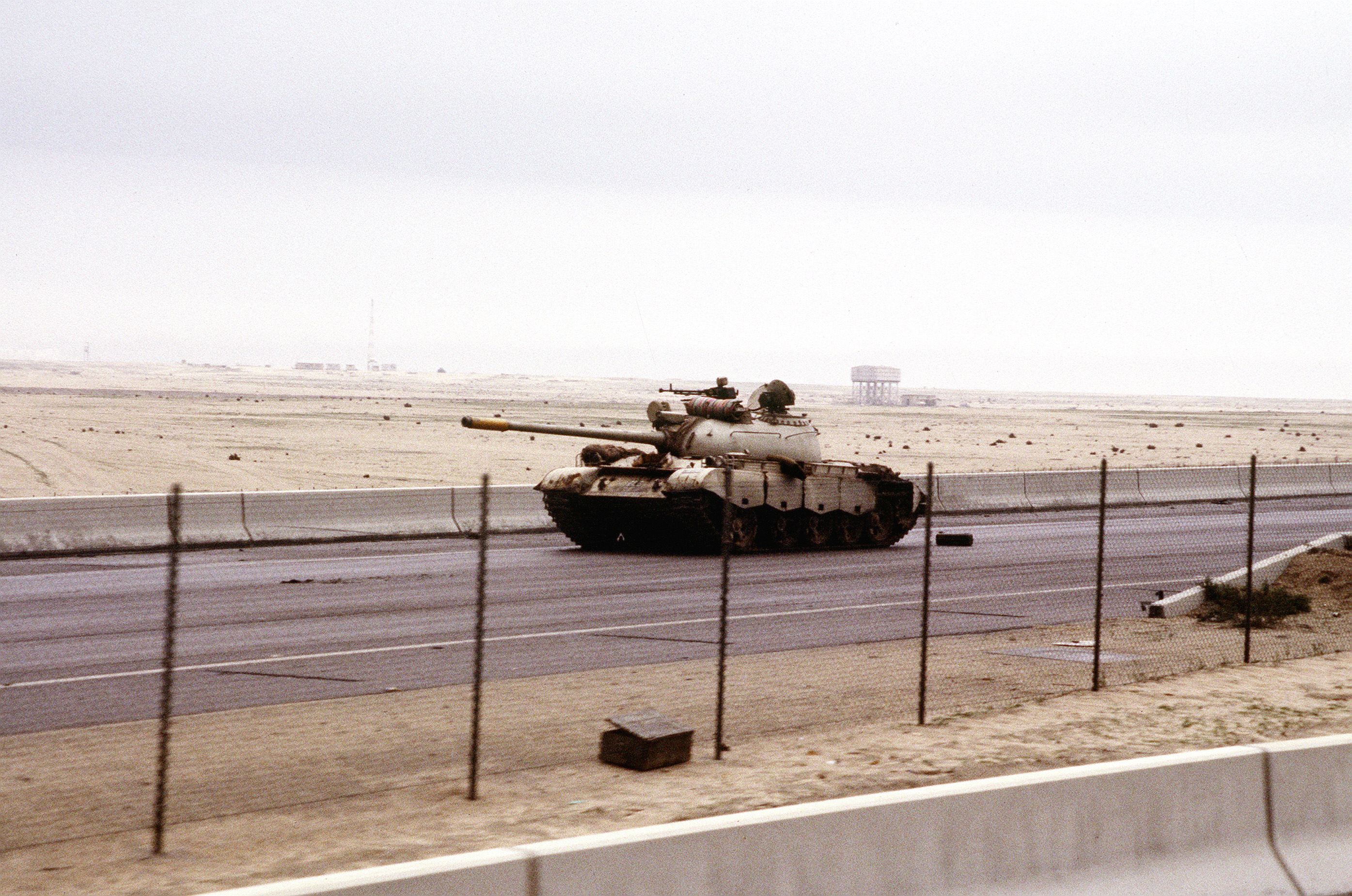
Iraqi Type 69 tank on the road into Kuwait City during the Gulf War

The invasion of Kuwait and annexation by Iraq took place on 2 August 1990. The initial casus belli was claimed to be support for a Kuwaiti rebellion against the Al Sabah family.

An Iraqi-backed Kuwaiti puppet leader named Alaa Hussein Ali was installed as head of the "Provisional Government of Free Kuwait." Iraq annexed Kuwait on 8 August. The war was traumatic to both countries.

Kuwaiti civilians founded a local armed resistance movement following the Iraqi occupation of Kuwait. The Kuwaiti resistance's casualty rate far exceeded that of the coalition military forces and Western hostages. The resistance predominantly consisted of ordinary citizens who lacked any form of training and supervision.

The underground resistance was punished by summary executions and torture. Almost all Kuwaitis at the time lost some family member. In addition, half the population, including native and foreign-born fled Kuwait to escape persecution.

George H. W. Bush condemned the invasion, and led efforts to drive out the Iraqi forces. Authorized by the United Nations Security Council, an American-led coalition of 34 nations fought the Gulf War to liberate Kuwait. Aerial bombardments began on 17 January 1991, and after several weeks a U.S.-led United Nations (UN) coalition began a ground assault on 23 February 1991 that achieved a complete removal of Iraqi forces from Kuwait in four days.

==== Controversies ====
===== Oil spill =====
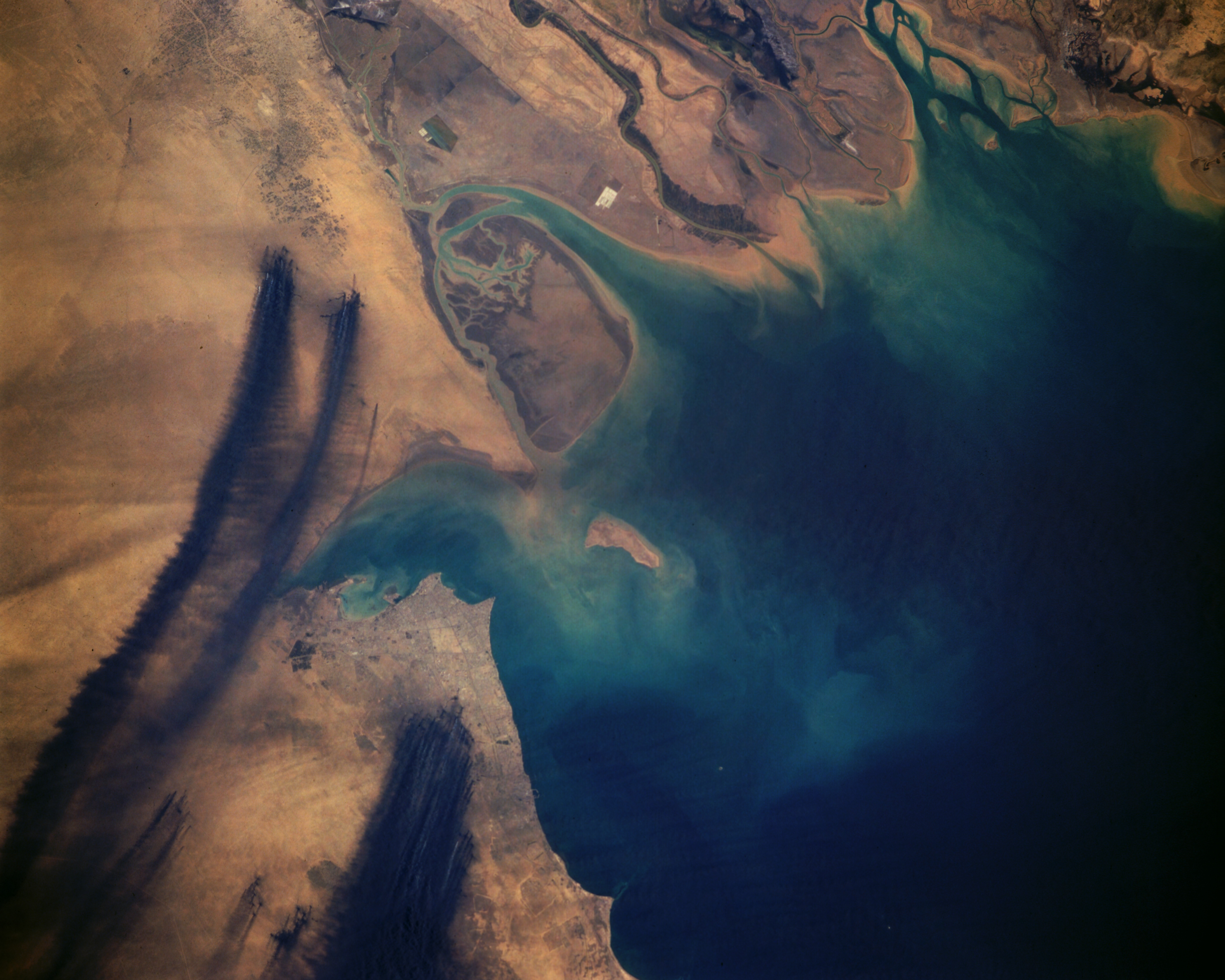
Smoke plumes from several Kuwaiti oil spill fires on April 7, 1991, as seen from a space shuttle during STS-37.

On 23 January 1991, Iraq dumped 400 million US gallons (1,500,000 m^{3}) of crude oil into the Persian Gulf, causing the largest offshore oil spill in history at that time. It was reported as a deliberate natural resources attack to keep US Marines from coming ashore (Missouri and Wisconsin had shelled Failaka Island during the war to reinforce the idea that there would be an amphibious assault attempt). About 30–40% of this came from allied raids on Iraqi coastal targets.

The land based Kuwait oil spill surpassed the Lakeview Gusher, which spilled nine million barrels in 1910, as the largest oil spill in recorded history.

===== Kuwaiti oil fires =====
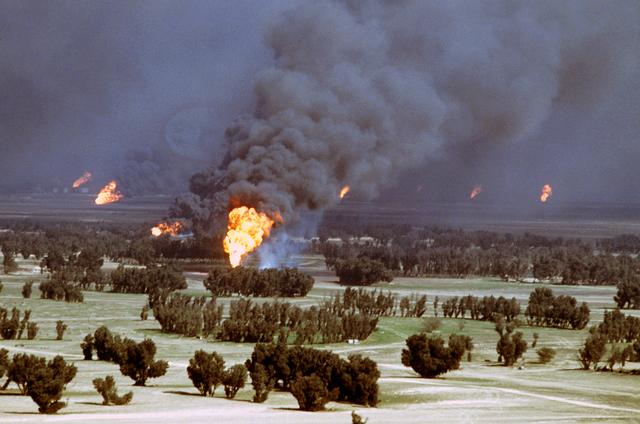
Oil fires in Kuwait in 1991, which were a result of the scorched earth policy of Iraqi military forces retreating from Kuwait.

The Kuwaiti oil fires were caused by the Iraqi military setting fire to 700 oil wells as part of a scorched earth policy while retreating from Kuwait in 1991 after conquering the country but being driven out by coalition forces. The fires started in January and February 1991, and the last one was extinguished by November.

The resulting fires burned uncontrollably because of the dangers of sending in firefighting crews. Land mines had been placed in areas around the oil wells, and a military cleaning of the areas was necessary before the fires could be put out. Somewhere around 6 million barrels (950,000 m^{3}) of oil were lost each day. Eventually, privately contracted crews extinguished the fires, at a total cost of US$1.5 billion to Kuwait. By that time, however, the fires had burned for approximately 10 months, causing widespread pollution in Kuwait.

The Kuwaiti Oil Minister estimated between twenty-five and fifty million barrels of unburned oil from damaged facilities pooled to create approximately 300 oil lakes, that contaminated around 40 million tons of sand and earth. The mixture of desert sand, unignited oil spilled and soot generated by the burning oil wells formed layers of hard "tarcrete", which covered nearly five percent of Kuwait's land mass.

Cleaning efforts were led by the Kuwait Institute for Scientific Research and the Arab Oil Co., who tested a number of technologies including the use of petroleum-degrading bacteria on the oil lakes.

Vegetation in most of the contaminated areas adjoining the oil lakes began recovering by the mid-1990s, but the dry climate has also partially solidified some of the lakes. Over time the oil has continued to sink into the sand, with potential consequences for Kuwait's small groundwater resources.

===== Highway of Death =====
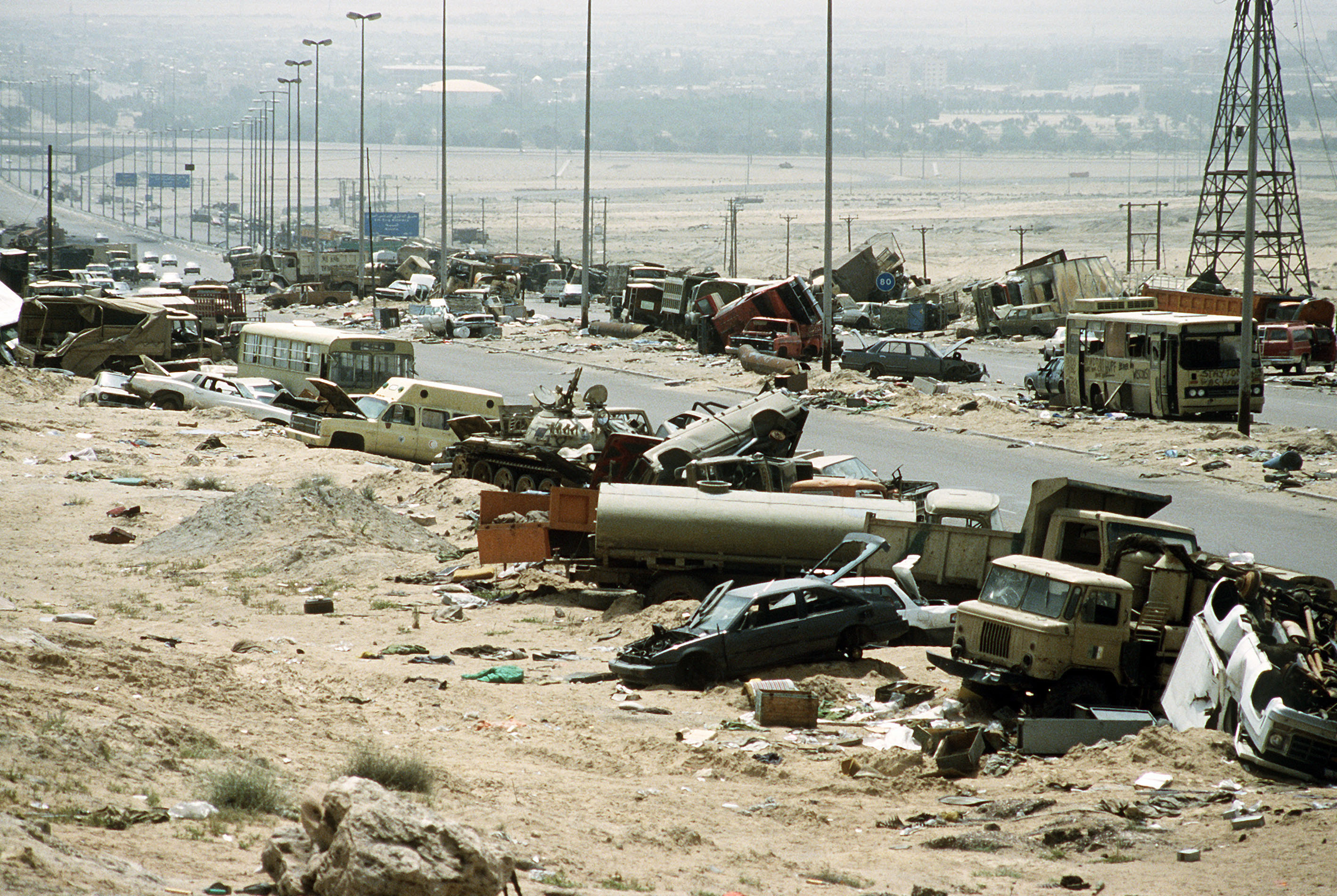
Destroyed civilian and military vehicles on the Highway of Death

On the night of 26–27 February 1991, several Iraqi forces began leaving Kuwait on the main highway north of Al Jahra in a column of some 1,400 vehicles. A patrolling E-8 Joint STARS aircraft observed the retreating forces and relayed the information to the DDM-8 air operations center in Saudi Arabia. These vehicles and the retreating soldiers were subsequently attacked by two A-10 aircraft, resulting in a 60 km stretch of highway strewn with debris—the Highway of Death. New York Times reporter Maureen Dowd wrote, "With the Iraqi leader facing military defeat, Mr. Bush decided that he would rather gamble on a violent and potentially unpopular ground war than risk the alternative: an imperfect settlement hammered out by the Soviets and Iraqis that world opinion might accept as tolerable."

Chuck Horner, Commander of US and allied air operations, has written:

[By February 26], the Iraqis totally lost heart and started to evacuate occupied Kuwait, but airpower halted the caravan of Iraqi Army and plunderers fleeing toward Basra. This event was later called by the media "The Highway of Death." There were certainly a lot of dead vehicles, but not so many dead Iraqis. They'd already learned to scamper off into the desert when our aircraft started to attack. Nevertheless, some people back home wrongly chose to believe we were cruelly and unusually punishing our already whipped foes.

...

By February 27, talk had turned toward terminating the hostilities. Kuwait was free. We were not interested in governing Iraq. So the question became "How do we stop the killing."

===== Nayriah testimony =====
The Nayirah testimony was a false testimony given before the United States Congressional Human Rights Caucus in October 1990 by a 15-year-old girl who was publicly identified by only her first name, Nayirah. The testimony was widely publicized in the American media and was cited numerous times by United States senators and President George H. W. Bush in their rationale to back Kuwait in the Gulf War. In 1992, it was revealed that Nayirah's last name was Al-Ṣabaḥ (Arabic: نيرة الصباح) and that she was the daughter of Saud bin Nasir Al-Sabah, the Kuwaiti ambassador to the United States. Furthermore, it was revealed that her testimony was organized as part of the Citizens for a Free Kuwait public relations campaign, which was run by the American public relations firm Hill & Knowlton for the Kuwaiti government. Following this, al-Sabah's testimony has come to be regarded as a classic example of modern atrocity propaganda.

In her emotional testimony, Nayirah claimed that after the Iraqi invasion of Kuwait she had witnessed Iraqi soldiers take babies out of incubators in a Kuwaiti hospital, take the incubators, and leave the babies to die.

Her story was initially corroborated by Amnesty International, a British NGO, which published several independent reports about the killings and testimony from evacuees. Following the liberation of Kuwait, reporters were given access to the country. An ABC report found that "patients, including premature babies, did die, when many of Kuwait's nurses and doctors ... fled" but Iraqi troops "almost certainly had not stolen hospital incubators and left hundreds of Kuwaiti babies to die." Amnesty International reacted by issuing a correction, with executive director John Healey subsequently accusing the Bush administration of "opportunistic manipulation of the international human rights movement".

===== Palestinian exodus from Kuwait =====
Significant demographic changes occurred in Kuwait as a result of the Gulf War. During the Iraqi occupation of Kuwait, 200,000 Palestinians voluntarily fled Kuwait due to various reasons (fear or persecution, food shortages, medical care difficulties, financial shortages, fear of arrest and mistreatment at roadblocks by Iraqis). After the Gulf War in 1991, nearly 200,000 Palestinians fled Kuwait, partly due to economic burdens, regulations on residence and fear of abuse by Kuwaiti security forces.

Prior to the Gulf War, Palestinians numbered 400,000 of Kuwait's population of 2.2 million. The Palestinians who fled Kuwait were mostly Jordanian citizens. In 2012, relations resumed and 80,000 Palestinians resided in Kuwait.

=== Aftermath of Gulf War liberation (1991–2006) ===
Immediately after liberation in 1991, the United Nations, under Security Council Resolution 687, demarcated the Iraq-Kuwait boundary on the basis of the 1932 and the 1963 agreements between the two states. In November 1994, Iraq formally accepted the UN-demarcated border with Kuwait, which had been further spelled out in Security Council Resolutions 773 (1992) and 833 (1993).

Criticism of the Al Sabah family in Kuwait became more pronounced following the country's return to sovereignty in 1991. The Al Sabah family were criticized for their actions during the Iraqi occupation. They were the first to flee Kuwait during the invasion. In early 1992, many press restrictions were lifted in Kuwait. After the October 1992 election, the National Assembly exercised a constitutional right to review all emiri decrees promulgated while the assembly was in dissolution. It has been suggested that the United States significantly pressured Kuwait to implement a more "democratic" political system as a condition for the country's liberation in 1991.

The United Nations Security Council has passed nearly 60 resolutions on Iraq and Kuwait since Iraq's invasion of Kuwait in 1990. The most relevant to this issue is Resolution 678, passed on 29 November 1990. It authorizes "member states co-operating with the Government of Kuwait ... to use all necessary means" to (1) implement Security Council Resolution 660 and other resolutions calling for the end of Iraq's occupation of Kuwait and withdrawal of Iraqi forces from Kuwaiti territory and (2) "restore international peace and security in the area". Resolution 678 has not been rescinded or nullified by succeeding resolutions and Iraq was not alleged after 1991 to invade Kuwait or to threaten to do so.

In March 2003, Kuwait became the springboard for the US-led invasion of Iraq. In preparation for the invasion, 100,000 U.S. troops assembled in Kuwait by 18 February.

=== Political crisis and economic turmoil (2006–2026) ===
From 2006 onwards, Kuwait has suffered from chronic political deadlocks and longstanding periods of cabinet reshuffles and dissolutions. This has significantly hampered investment and economic reforms in Kuwait, making the country's economy much more dependent on oil.

On 15 January 2006, Emir Sheikh Jaber Al-Ahmed died and his crown prince, Sheikh Saad Al-Abdullah of the Salem branch was named Emir. On 23 January 2006, the assembly unanimously voted in favor of Sheikh Saad Al-Abdullah abdicating in favor of Sheikh Sabah Al-Ahmed, citing his illness with a form of dementia. Instead of naming a successor from the Salem branch as per convention, Sheikh Sabah Al-Ahmed named his half-brother Sheikh Nawaf Al-Ahmed as crown prince and his nephew Sheikh Nasser Al-Mohammed as prime minister.

In August 2011, supporters of Sheikh Ahmed Al-Fahad Al-Ahmed Al-Sabah "discovered" documents that incriminated up to one-third of Kuwaiti politicians in what quickly became the largest political corruption scandal in Kuwaiti history. By October 2011, 16 Kuwaiti politicians were alleged to have received payments of $350m in return for their support of government policy.

In December 2013, allies of Sheikh Ahmad Al-Fahad claimed to possess tapes purportedly showing that Sheikh Nasser Al-Mohammed Al-Sabah and Jassem Al-Kharafi were discussing plans to topple the Kuwaiti government. Sheikh Ahmad Al-Fahad appeared on local channel Al-Watan TV describing his claims.

In March 2014, David S. Cohen, then Under Secretary of the Treasury for Terrorism and Financial Intelligence, accused Kuwait of funding terrorism. Since the end of the Gulf War in 1991, accusations of Kuwait funding terrorism have been very common and come from a wide variety of sources including intelligence reports, Western government officials, scholarly research, and renowned journalists. From 2014 to 2015, Kuwait was frequently described as the world's biggest source of terrorism funding, particularly for ISIS and Al-Qaeda.

In April 2014, the Kuwaiti government imposed a total media blackout to ban any reporting or discussion on the issue. In March 2015, Kuwait's public prosecutor dropped all investigations into the alleged coup plot and Sheikh Ahmad Al-Fahad read a public apology on Kuwait state television renouncing the coup allegations. Since then, "numerous associates of his have been targeted and detained by the Kuwaiti authorities on various charges," most notably members of the so-called "Fintas Group" that had allegedly been the original circulators of the fake coup video.

On 26 June 2015, a suicide bombing took place at a Shia Muslim mosque in Kuwait. The Islamic State of Iraq and the Levant claimed responsibility for the attack. Twenty-seven people were killed and 227 people were wounded. In the aftermath, a lawsuit was filed accusing the Kuwaiti government of negligence and direct responsibility for the terror attack.

In December 2015, Sheikh Ahmad Al-Fahad was convicted of "disrespect to the public prosecutor and attributing a remark to the country's ruler without a special permission from the emir's court," issuing a suspended six-month prison sentence and a fine of 1,000 Kuwaiti Dinar. In January 2016, the Kuwaiti appeals court overturned the prior ruling and cleared Sheikh Ahmad Al-Fahad of all charges.

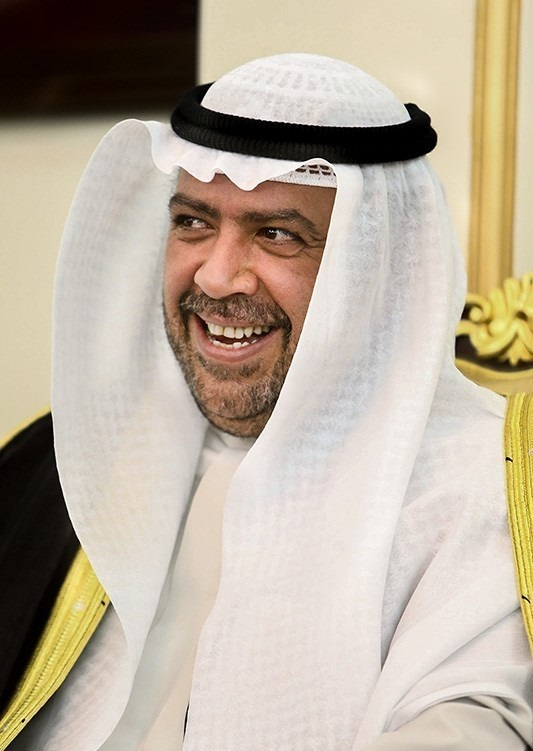
Sheikh Ahmad Al-Fahad during a press conference in Tehran

In November 2018, Sheikh Ahmad Al-Fahad, along with four other defendants, were charged in Switzerland with forgery related to the fake coup video. Shortly thereafter, Sheikh Ahmad Al-Fahad temporarily stepped aside from his role at the International Olympic Committee, pending an ethics committee hearing into the allegations.

In June 2019, government official Fahad Al Rajaan and his spouse were given life sentences in absentia by the Kuwait criminal court; personal property was confiscated, and they were ordered to repay $82 million, as well as being fined "twice that amount.

In November 2019, former deputy prime minister and minister of interior Sheikh Khaled Al Jarrah Al Sabah was dismissed from office after minister of defense Sheikh Nasser Sabah Al Ahmed Al Sabah filed a complaint with the Kuwaiti Attorney General alleging embezzlement of 240 million Kuwaiti dinars ($794.5 million) of Kuwait government funds had taken place during Khaled's tenure as minister of defense.

The COVID-19 pandemic has exacerbated Kuwait's economic crisis. Kuwait's economy faced a budget deficit of $46 billion in 2020. Kuwait was downgraded by S&P Global Ratings two times in less than two years because of declining oil revenue and delayed fiscal reforms.

In July 2020, the US Department of Justice filed an asset forfeiture claim against The Mountain Beverly Hills and other real property in the United States, alleging a group of three Kuwaiti officials, including Sheikh Khaled Al Jarrah, set up unauthorized accounts in the name of the country's Military Attache Office in London, known as the 'Army Fund.' They allegedly funded the accounts with over $100m of Kuwaiti public money and used it for their own purposes.

In September 2020, Kuwait's Crown Prince Sheikh Nawaf Al-Ahmad Al-Jaber Al-Sabah became the 16th Emir of Kuwait and the successor to Emir Sheikh Sabah Al-Ahmad Al-Jaber Al-Sabah, who died at the age of 91. In October 2020, Sheikh Mishal Al-Ahmad Al-Jaber Al-Sabah was appointed as the Crown Prince.

Since January 2021, Kuwait has been experiencing its worst political crisis in many decades. Kuwait is also facing a looming debt crisis according to various media sources. Kuwait is widely considered the region's most oil-dependent country with the least amount of economic diversification. According to the World Economic Forum, Kuwait is the least economically developed Gulf country. Kuwait has the weakest infrastructure in the entire GCC region.

In March 2021, the Kuwaiti ministerial court ordered the detention of Sheikh Khaled Al Jarrah, who was then arrested and imprisoned.

On April 13, 2021, a Kuwaiti court ordered the detention of former prime minister Sheikh Jaber Al-Mubarak Al-Hamad Al-Sabah on corruption charges related to the 'Army Fund.' He is the first former Kuwaiti prime minister to face pre-trial detention over graft charges. The crimes allegedly took place during Jaber Al-Sabah's 2001–11 term as defense minister.

In August 2021, Sheikh Ahmed Al-Fahad attended court in Switzerland alongside three of the other four defendants. In September 2021, the Swiss court convicted Sheikh Ahmed Al-Fahad of forgery along with the four other defendants. He denied wrongdoing and plans to appeal.

In December 2023, Sheikh Mishal Al-Ahmad Al-Jaber Al-Sabah was appointed as 17th Emir of Kuwait after the death of Nawaf Al-Ahmad Al-Jaber Al-Sabah.

=== Kuwait and the 2026 Iran War (2026–Present) ===
In the 28th of February, Iran was attacked by the United States and Israel, in response, Iran attacked the gulf countries, including Kuwait, in the 1st day, Kuwait International Airport, Ali Al-Salem Airbase, Jaber Al-Ahmad Airbase, and other sites were attacked by Iranian Missiles and Drones.

In the 1st of March, Kuwait's Port Shuaiba was attacked by Iran, killing 6 US soldiers, the first US casualties of the 2026 Iran War, the United States Embassy was also hit by drones.

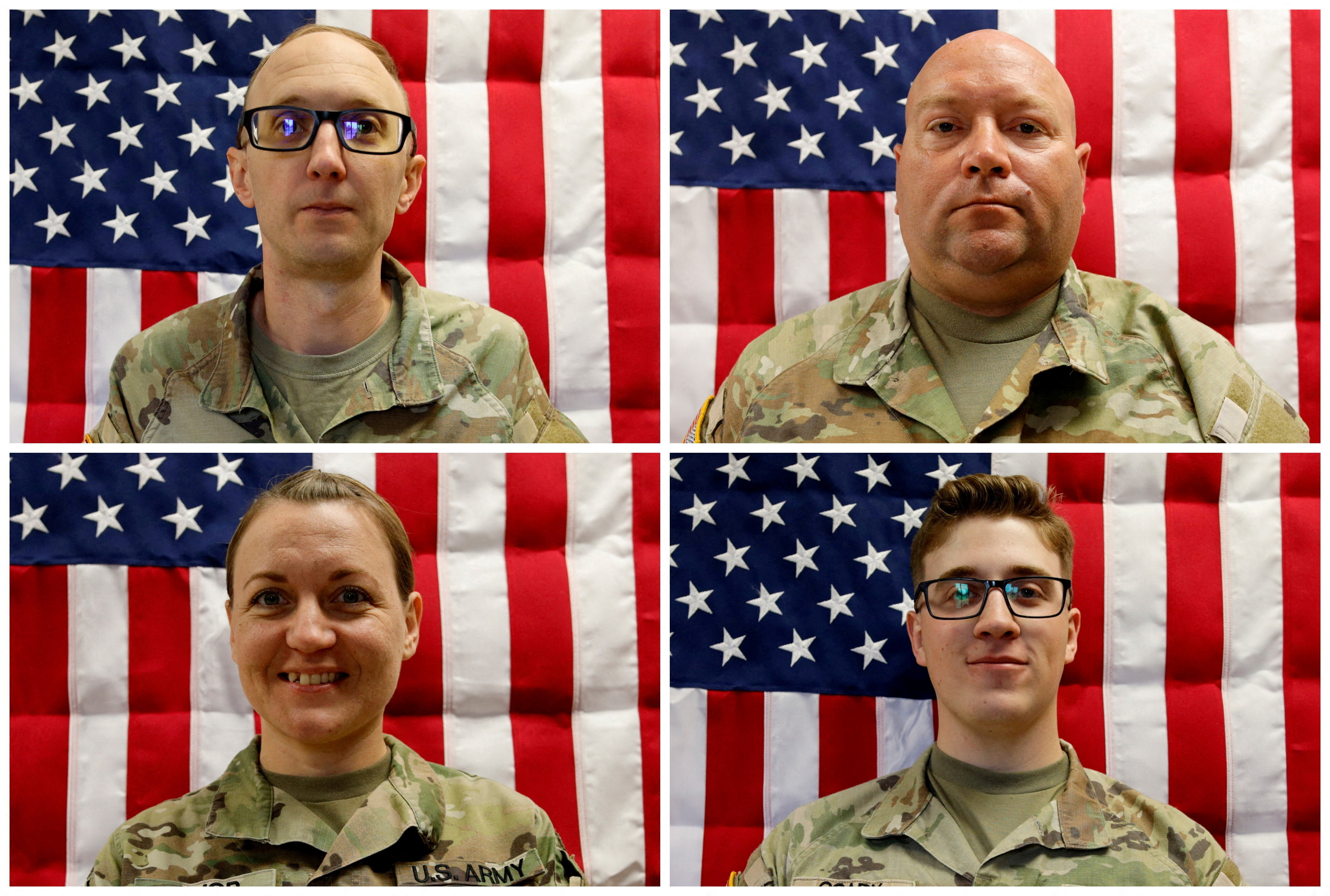
4 of the 6 Casualities in the Port Shuaiba Drone Attack

Kuwait International Airport was attacked multiple times between the 28th of February and 1st of April, in the airport, fuel tanks were struck and swiftly taken down by the Kuwaiti Fire Forces, the 28th of February Strikes damaged Terminal 1's Check-in area and the Terminal 2 Construction site.

Multiple Desalination Plants and the Mina Al-Ahmadi Oil Refinery were struck by Iranian Drones in multiple occasions.

In the 2nd of March, Kuwaiti Air Force Anti-Air Defenses shot down 3 US F/15 jets in a friendly fire incident. It is also possible it could be a Kuwaiti F/A-18 Hornet.

== See also ==
- Mesopotamia
- Dilmun
- Timeline of Kuwait City
- List of museums in Kuwait

== Bibliography ==
- Anscombe, Frederick F. (1997). The Ottoman Gulf: The Creation of Kuwait, Saudi Arabia, and Qatar. New York City: Columbia University Press. ISBN 978-0-231-10839-3.
- Black, Jeremy; Green, Anthony (1992), Gods, Demons and Symbols of Ancient Mesopotamia: An Illustrated Dictionary, The British Museum * Press, ISBN 0714117056
- Clancy, Tom; Horner, Chuck (1999). Every Man a Tiger: The Gulf War Air Campaign. Putnam. ISBN 978-0-399-14493-6.
- Slot, B. J. (2005). Mubarak Al-Sabah: Founder of Modern Kuwait 1896–1915. London: Arabian Publishing. ISBN 978-0-9544792-4-4.
