= Jaber Al-Ahmad Al-Sabah =

Emir of Kuwait from 1977 to 2006

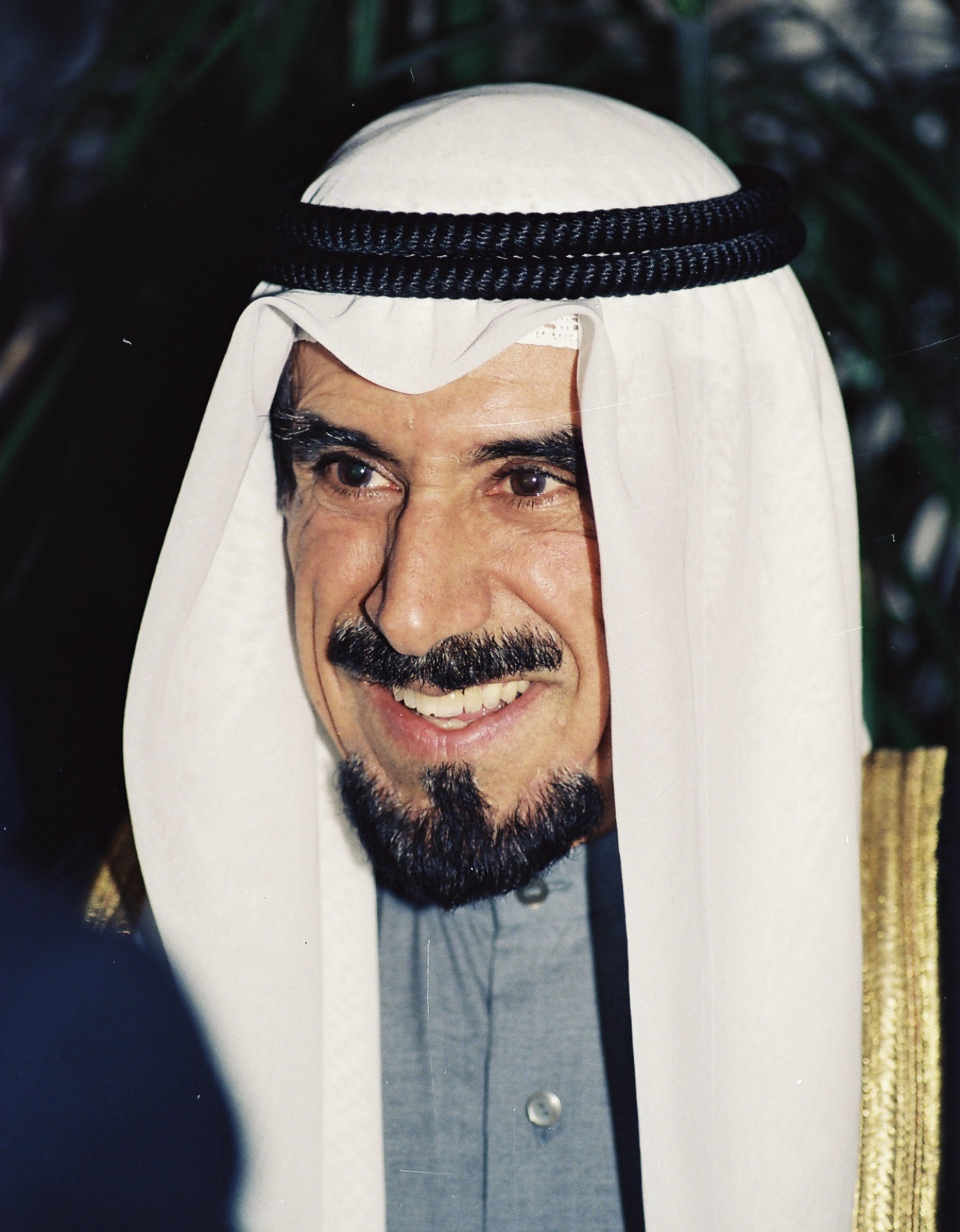

Emir of Kuwait
- Reign: 31 December 1977 – 15 January 2006
- Predecessor: Sabah Al-Salim Al-Sabah
- Successor: Saad Al-Abdullah Al-Salim Al-Sabah
- Prime Ministers: See list: Himself (1977–1978) Saad Al-Abdullah Al-Salim Al-Sabah (1978–1990) 1st time (1991–2003) 2nd time Sabah Al-Ahmad Al-Jaber Al-Sabah (2003–2006)

Prime Minister of Kuwait
- Reign: 30 November 1965 – 8 February 1978
- Predecessor: Sabah Al-Salim Al-Sabah
- Successor: Saad Al-Abdullah Al-Salim Al-Sabah
- Emir: See list: Sabah III Himself
- Born: 29 June 1926; Kuwait City, Sheikhdom of Kuwait
- Died: 15 January 2006 (aged 79); Kuwait City, Kuwait
- Burial: Sulaibikhat Cemetery, Kuwait
- House: Sabah
- Father: Ahmad Al-Jaber Al-Sabah
- Mother: Bibi Salem Mubarak Al-Sabah
- Religion: Sunni Islam

Sheikh Jaber Al-Ahmad Al-Jaber Al-Sabah (29 June 1926 – 15 January 2006) (Arabic: الشيخ جابر الأحمد الجابر الصباح, romanized: ash-Shaykh Jābir al-ʾAḥmad al-Jābir aṣ-Ṣabāḥ), also known as Jaber III, was the Emir of Kuwait from 31 December 1977 until his death in 2006. The 13th ruler in his family's dynasty, Jaber's reign oversaw the transition of a relatively traditional society into a modernized state. He also led Kuwait through the Gulf War, defeating Ba'athist Iraq and Saddam Hussein with the support of the United States.

The third monarch to rule Kuwait since its independence from Britain, Jaber had previously served as minister of finance and economy from 1962 to 1965 when he was appointed prime minister prior to becoming Kuwait's ruler.

== Early life and education ==
Jaber was born on 29 June 1926 in Kuwait City. He was the third son of Ahmad Al-Jaber Al-Sabah.

Jaber received his early education at Al-Mubarakiya School, Al-Ahmediya School, and Al-Sharqiya School, and was subsequently tutored privately in English, Arabic, religion and the sciences.

His brother, Fahad Al-Ahmed Al-Jaber Al-Sabah, was killed in 1990 in the Gulf War in front of Dasman Palace.

== Career ==
=== Early career ===
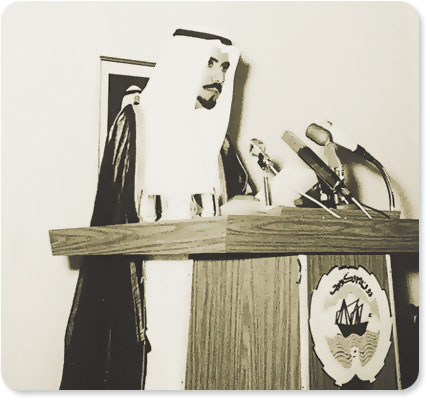
Sheikh Jaber Al-Ahmed Al-Jaber Al-Sabah during the opening of the Kuwait Fund for Arab Economic Development in 1961

In 1962, he was appointed Kuwait's minister of finance when the ministry was established. In this position, Jaber was tasked with putting the new Kuwaiti dinar into circulation and establishing the Kuwaiti Currency Board, of which he was the chair. As minister, Jaber adopted, and was the first chairman of, the Kuwaiti Fund for Arab Economic Development from 1962 to 1964. The Fund provides financial and technical assistance to developing countries. The country's oil revenues transformed it from a largely rural seafaring society to a modern state. During this time, the Fund expanded to aid five countries and gave loans to another eight. The money going into the fund came from oil earnings.

After Iraq claimed sovereignty over Kuwait in 1961, following independence from Great Britain, Al-Sabah led a delegation to the Arab League to resolve the issue. The United Kingdom informed Iraqi Prime Minister Abd al-Karim Qasim that it would militarily assist Kuwait in the event of military action, leading to Operation Vantage. Iraq recognised Kuwait's independence in 1963, though it disputed the borders.

=== Iran–Iraq War ===
Kuwait found itself geographically in the middle of the Iran–Iraq War that took place from 1980 to 1988. Throughout the war, the country suffered from many security threats, including a series of bombings. In 1986, one year after an attack on Jaber's motorcade, there was an attack on an oil installation, which almost caused the shutdown of Kuwait's oil industry.

=== Gulf War ===
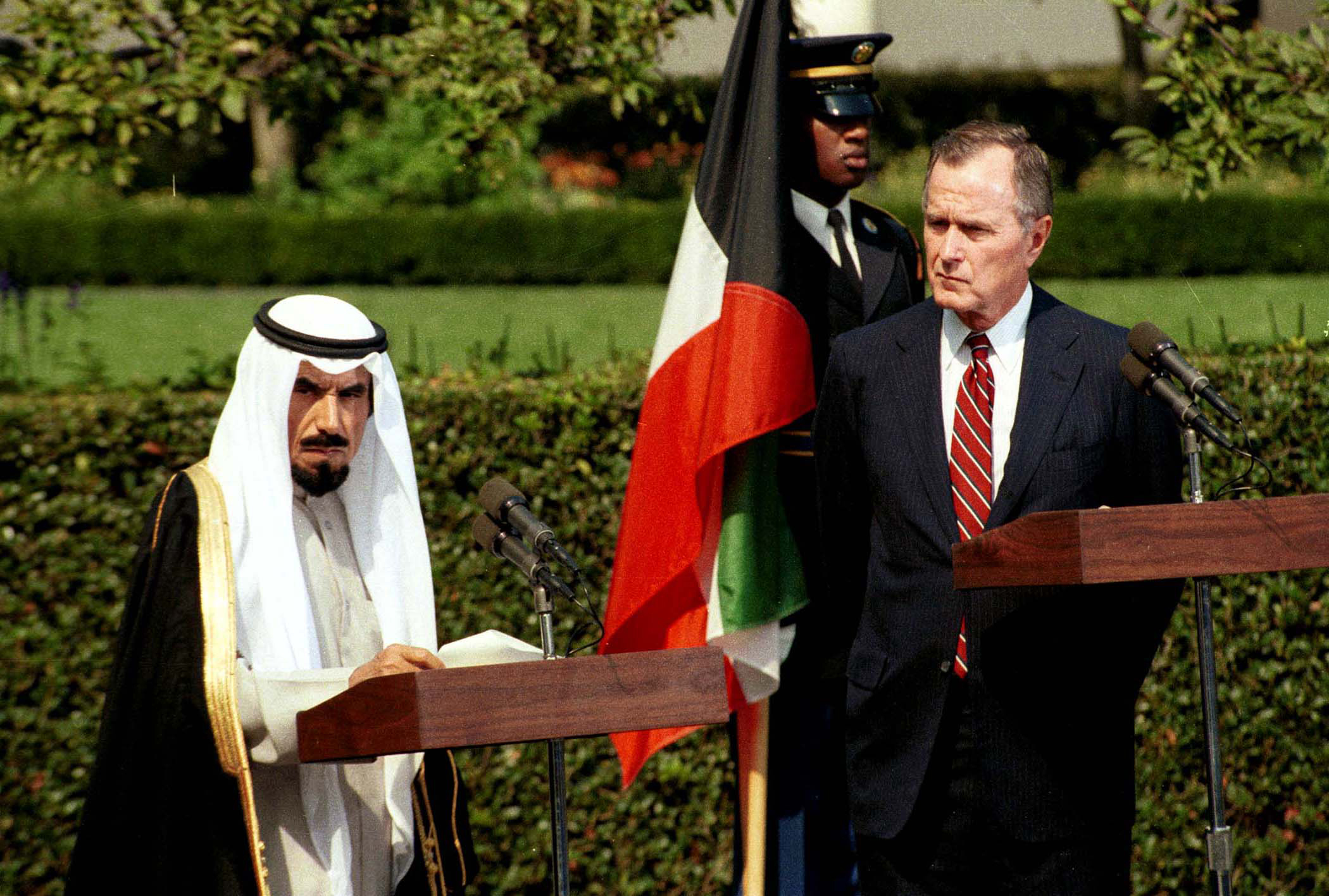
President Bush with Jaber Al-Ahmad Al-Sabah on the South Lawn of the White House, 1990.

Some sources claim that the task of the invading Iraqi forces was to capture or kill Jaber. However, such a claimed plan was not possible with the exile of Jaber and his government to Saudi Arabia within hours of the invasion where they ran the Kuwaiti exiled government from a hotel in Ta'if, Saudi Arabia.

From Ta'if, Jaber set up his government so that its ministers were in communication with the people still in Kuwait. The government was able to direct an underground armed resistance made up of both military and civilian forces and was able to provide public services to the Kuwaiti people who remained, such as emergency care through the funds that it had saved from oil revenues. In the meantime, Jaber and his government lobbied to receive military support action against Iraq before and during the Gulf War. When the war ended on 28 February 1991, Jaber remained in Saudi Arabia while declaring three months of martial law, causing the accusation that he was trying to monopolize too much power for the small constitutional monarchy. He returned to Kuwait in March 1991, after American-led efforts to restore his rule and remove the Iraqi army. By imposing martial law, government officials were able to ensure that there were no Iraqis still in Kuwait who may have attempted to once again overthrow the government. They were also tasked with making sure that the country was safe enough for Jaber and his government to return, which they eventually did on 15 March 1991.

On 15 March 1991, Jaber returned to Kuwait, staying at the private home of a wealthy Kuwaiti as his own palace had been destroyed. He was met with a symbolic arrival with several dozens cars filled with people honking their car horns and waving Kuwaiti flags who tried to follow the Emir's convoy.

He was involved in a high profile case involving Sulaiman Al-Adsani, and the lawyer Hazel Fox, in 1996. Al-Adsani, who was British, had leave to sue the Kuwaiti government concerning his torture. It was alleged that he had distributed a pornographic tape involving a sheikh and as a result he was held under water and burned as torture by Jaber Al-Ahmad Al-Sabah. The case was raised in the British government, noting that threats had been made by the Kuwaiti ambassador against Sulaiman Al-Adsani's life. The case failed because of a defense of diplomatic immunity.

=== 2003 US invasion of Iraq ===
During the 2003 US invasion of Iraq, and unlike the ruling family of Saudi Arabia, Jaber openly allowed the United States to use Kuwait as a base.

== Personal life and death ==
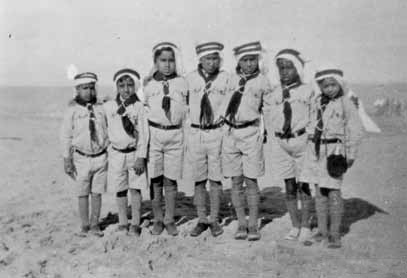
Al-Mubarakiya School first boys scouts (1936–1938) showing Jaber Al-Ahmad Al-Sabah third from the left.

Al-Sabah had 4 wives in 1997, and about 70 children.

In September 2001, Jaber suffered from a stroke and went to the United Kingdom for treatment. He died on 15 January 2006, aged 79, from the cerebral hemorrhage that he had suffered in 2001 and was succeeded by the Crown Prince Saad Al-Abdullah Al-Salim Al-Sabah. The government announced a 40-day period of mourning and closed offices for three days. Bahrain declared forty days of mourning; Jordan announced seven days of mourning; Yemen, Egypt, Iraq, Algeria, Oman, Syria, Pakistan, Mauritius and the State of Palestine all declared three days of mourning; India declared one day of mourning. He was buried at Sulaibikhat Cemetery alongside his kin.

== See also ==
- House of Sabah
- Flag of Kuwait

Jaber Al-Ahmad Al-Sabah House of Sabah Born: 29 June 1926 Died: 15 January 2006
Regnal titles
Preceded by Sabah Al-Salim Al-Sabah	Emir of Kuwait; 1977–2006	Succeeded by Saad I Al-Abdullah Al-Salim Al-Sabah
