= Prime Minister of Kuwait =

Head of government

Prime Minister of the State of Kuwait
- Emblem of Kuwait

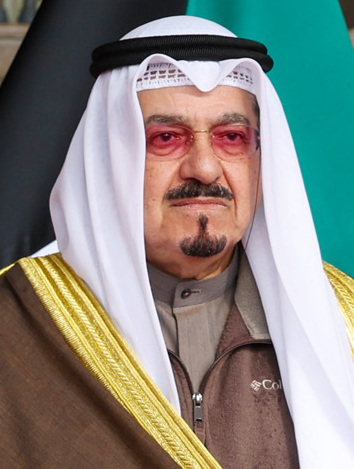
- Incumbent; Ahmad Al-Abdullah Al-Sabah since 15 May 2024
- Executive branch of the Government of Kuwait; Cabinet of Kuwait
- Residence: No official residence
- Seat: Kuwait City, Kuwait
- Appointer: Emir of Kuwait
- Term length: Four years unlimited renewal
- Constituting instrument: Constitution of Kuwait
- Formation: 17 January 1962
- First holder: Abdullah Al-Salim Al-Sabah
- Website: Diwan of His Highness the Prime Minister

The prime minister of Kuwait is the head of government of Kuwait. As the third most powerful official in the country, following the emir of Kuwait and Speaker of the National Assembly, the prime minister leads the executive branch of the Government of Kuwait.

Abdullah Al-Salim Al-Sabah, the emir of Kuwait during the period of Kuwait's independence, appointed himself the first prime minister of Kuwait on 17 January 1962, after the Constituent Assembly was elected to draft the Constitution.

Until 2003, the crown prince of Kuwait was usually appointed to the office of prime minister.

Mohammed Sabah Al-Salem Al-Sabah held the position of Prime Minister of Kuwait starting 17 January 2024 and transitioned to a caretaker role on 15 April 2024 after his successor was designated. Sheikh Ahmad Al-Abdullah Al-Sabah assumed office on May 15, 2024, after being sworn in before the emir of Kuwait.

== List of officeholders (1962–present) ==
No.	Portrait	Name (Birth–Death)	Term of office			Head of state
No.	Portrait	Name (Birth–Death)	Took office	Left office	Time in office	Head of state
1		Abdullah Al-Salim Al-Sabah (1895–1965)	17 January 1962	26 January 1963	1 year, 9 days	Abdullah Al-Salim Al-Sabah (1950–1965)
2		Sabah Al-Salim Al-Sabah (1913–1977)	2 February 1963	27 November 1965	2 years, 298 days	Abdullah Al-Salim Al-Sabah (1950–1965)
3		Jaber Al-Ahmad Al-Sabah (1926–2006)	27 November 1965	8 February 1978	12 years, 73 days	Sabah Al-Salim Al-Sabah (1965–1977)
4		Saad Al-Salim Al-Sabah (1930–2008) (Note: In exile in Taif, Saudi Arabia between 2 August 1990 and 15 March 1991, due to the Iraqi invasion and occupation, and the subsequent Gulf War.)	8 February 1978	13 July 2003	25 years, 155 days	Jaber Al-Ahmad Al-Sabah (1977–2006)
5		Sabah Al-Ahmad Al-Jaber Al-Sabah (1929–2020)	13 July 2003	30 January 2006	2 years, 201 days	Jaber Al-Ahmad Al-Sabah (1977–2006); Saad Al-Salim Al-Sabah (15 January–24 January 2006)
6		Nasser Al-Mohammed Al-Sabah (born 1940)	7 February 2006	28 November 2011	5 years, 294 days	Sabah Al-Ahmad Al-Jaber Al-Sabah (2006–2020)
7		Jaber Al-Mubarak Al-Hamad Al-Sabah (1942–2024)	30 November 2011	19 November 2019	7 years, 354 days	Sabah Al-Ahmad Al-Jaber Al-Sabah (2006–2020)
8		Sabah Al-Khalid Al-Sabah (born 1953)	19 November 2019	24 July 2022	2 years, 247 days	Sabah Al-Ahmad Al-Jaber Al-Sabah (2006–2020); Nawaf Al-Ahmad Al-Jaber Al-Sabah (2020–2023)
9		Ahmad Nawaf Al-Ahmad Al-Sabah (born 1956)	24 July 2022	17 January 2024	1 year, 177 days	Nawaf Al-Ahmad Al-Jaber Al-Sabah (2020–2023); Mishal Al-Ahmad Al-Jaber Al-Sabah (2023–present)
10		Mohammad Sabah Al-Salem Al-Sabah (born 1955)	17 January 2024	15 May 2024	119 days	Mishal Al-Ahmad Al-Jaber Al-Sabah (2023–present)
11		Ahmad Al-Abdullah Al-Sabah (born 1952)	15 May 2024	Incumbent	2 years, 115 days	Mishal Al-Ahmad Al-Jaber Al-Sabah (2023–present)

== See also ==
- Kuwait National Guard
- Ministry of Foreign Affairs (Kuwait)
- Ministry of Defense (Kuwait)
- Ministry of Interior (Kuwait)
- Politics of Kuwait
