= Saddam Hussein's alleged shredder =

Early 2000s propaganda rumor

In the runup to the 2003 invasion of Iraq, press stories appeared in the United Kingdom and United States of a plastic shredder or wood chipper into which Saddam and Qusay Hussein fed opponents of their Baathist rule. These stories attracted worldwide attention and boosted support for military action, in stories with titles such as "See men shredded, then say you don't back war". A year later, it was determined there was not enough evidence to support the existence of such a machine.

== Press reports ==
The first mention of the shredder came at a meeting on 12 March 2003, when James Mahon addressed the British House of Commons after returning from research in northern Iraq.

Ann Clwyd wrote in The Times six days later, an article entitled "See men shredded, then say you don't back war," saying that an unnamed Iraqi had said the Husseins used a shredder to gruesomely kill male opponents, and used their shredded bodies as fish food. Later she would add that it was believed to be housed in Abu Ghraib prison, and spoke with an unidentified person who claimed the shredders were dismantled "just before the military got there". Two days later, Australian Prime Minister John Howard made reference to the "human-shredding machine".

In William Shawcross' 2003 book Allies: The United States, Britain, Europe and the War in Iraq, he claimed that Saddam Hussein "fed people into huge shredders, feet first to prolong the agony". The Sun's political editor Trevor Kavanagh wrote in February 2004 that "Public opinion swung behind Tony Blair as voters learned how Saddam fed dissidents feet first into industrial shredders."

No further evidence for the existence of the shredder has ever been published, though a witness named Ahmed Hassan Mohammed at Saddam's trial in December 2005 claimed to have seen it. Saddam's half-brother, Barzan Ibrahim al-Tikriti, verbally attacked the witness, shouting he "should act in the cinema."

== Rev. Kenneth Joseph ==
For Americans, a major domestic source for the shredder story was the (later discredited) testimony of Assyrian Christian Ken Joseph Jr., a pastor who had entered Iraq in 2003 and whose family came from Mahoudi in Northern Iraq. He reportedly found that far from trying to avoid conflict, Iraqis were in favor of an American invasion, and "would commit suicide if American bombing didn't start." He promptly reversed himself and exited the country after hearing this and first-hand accounts of Saddam's shredding machine: "Their tales of slow torture and killing made me ill, such as people put in a huge shredder for plastic products, feet first so they could hear their screams as bodies got chewed up from foot to head." Johann Hari, a British supporter of the Iraq war, quoted Joseph saying the trip "shocked me back to reality" in a column in The Independent published on 26 March 2003. His piece "I Was Wrong" became a pivotal argument on the whole idea of liberating Iraq.

Groups that organized the human shield action in Iraq say they have no record of Rev. Kenneth Joseph Jr., and "no one, it seems, ever met him." Human shield activists speculated that if Joseph had gone to Iraq he was likely "motivated by his campaign for 'Assyrian Independence' rather than the welfare of the Iraqi people in the face of an invasion."

== Doubts surface ==
Brendan O'Neill was the first Western journalist to seriously challenge the existence of the shredder, in reports for The Spectator and The Guardian in February 2004. He asked Clwyd and Mahon to provide evidence or the names of the Iraqis who gave them the story. He spoke with the doctor who dealt with executed prisoners at Abu Ghraib during Saddam Hussein's rule, who said that all executions were performed by hanging, and denied claims that there was a shredder of any type.

Did he ever attend to, or hear of, prisoners who had been shredded? "No." Did any of the other doctors at Abu Ghraib speak of a shredding machine used to execute prisoners? "No, no, never."

Clwyd responded to O'Neill's allegations in The Guardian later the same month, stating:

Brendan O'Neill was told by my office, but chose not to include in his article, the following information. In his statement, the witness who said that people were killed by the shredder was very specific: he named individuals who he said were killed in the shredder and the individuals who he said supervised the execution by shredder; he stated where the shredder was located and the month and year when the executions took place. The witness was closely questioned by Indict researchers and was described by them as being "unshakeable". He said he is also prepared to testify in court about the incident.

Brendan O'Neill wrote a letter in response to Clwyd's, claiming that her office had actually refused to give him the information he asked for:

Over the phone, a member of Clwyd's staff read to me, at breakneck speed, a pre-prepared statement about the witness. She said I could not ask any questions about the statement, that it would not be faxed or emailed to me, and that none of the witness's specific information would be made available to me. When I phoned Clwyd to make further inquiries, she hung up.

O'Neill returned to the topic in February 2010, writing "Neither Amnesty International nor Human Rights Watch, in their numerous investigations into human rights abuses in Iraq, had ever heard anyone talk of a human-shredding machine."

== See also ==
- Atrocity propaganda
- Conspiracy theories in the Arab world
- Nayirah testimony
- Jumana Hanna
- Yeonmi Park
