= Tom Lantos Human Rights Commission =

US House body dedicated to protecting behavior norms in international law

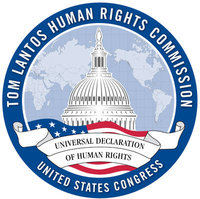
- Abbreviation: TLHRC
- Co-chairs: James P. McGovern and Christopher H. Smith
- Executive Committee: Ilhan Omar; Jamie Raskin; Norma Torres; Derek Tran
- Purpose: "promoting, defending and advocating for international human rights as enshrined in the Universal Declaration of Human Rights and other relevant human rights instruments."
- Founder: H.Res. 1451
- Founded: 2008; 18 years ago.
- Preceded by: Congressional Human Rights Caucus (CHRC)
- Seats in the United States House of Representatives: 51 / 435

Website
- humanrightscommission.house.gov

The Tom Lantos Human Rights Commission (TLHRC) is a bipartisan body of the United States House of Representatives. Its stated mission is "to promote, defend and advocate internationally recognized human rights norms in a nonpartisan manner, both within and outside of Congress, as enshrined in the Universal Declaration of Human Rights and other relevant human rights instruments."

The Commission was formed out of the Congressional Human Rights Caucus in 2008, following the death of Tom Lantos, with the passage of H.Res.1451, the Tom Lantos Human Rights Commission Establishment Resolution. Through this mandate, the Commission became a formal body of the House which serves to provide educational and advisory services to Members of Congress, coordinate human rights initiatives in the House, and communicate with the Executive branch as well as international human rights entities to facilitate human rights initiatives in Congress. The Commission is nonpartisan and is led by two co-chairs, one Democrat and one Republican. The current co-chairs are Congressmen Jim McGovern and Chris Smith.

The Tom Lantos Human Rights Commission is not a national human rights institution (NHRI). The United States does not currently have such an institution. Some duties typical of an NHRI are conducted by the Department of State and Department of Justice.

== Congressional Human Rights Caucus (1983–2008) ==
=== Cases ===
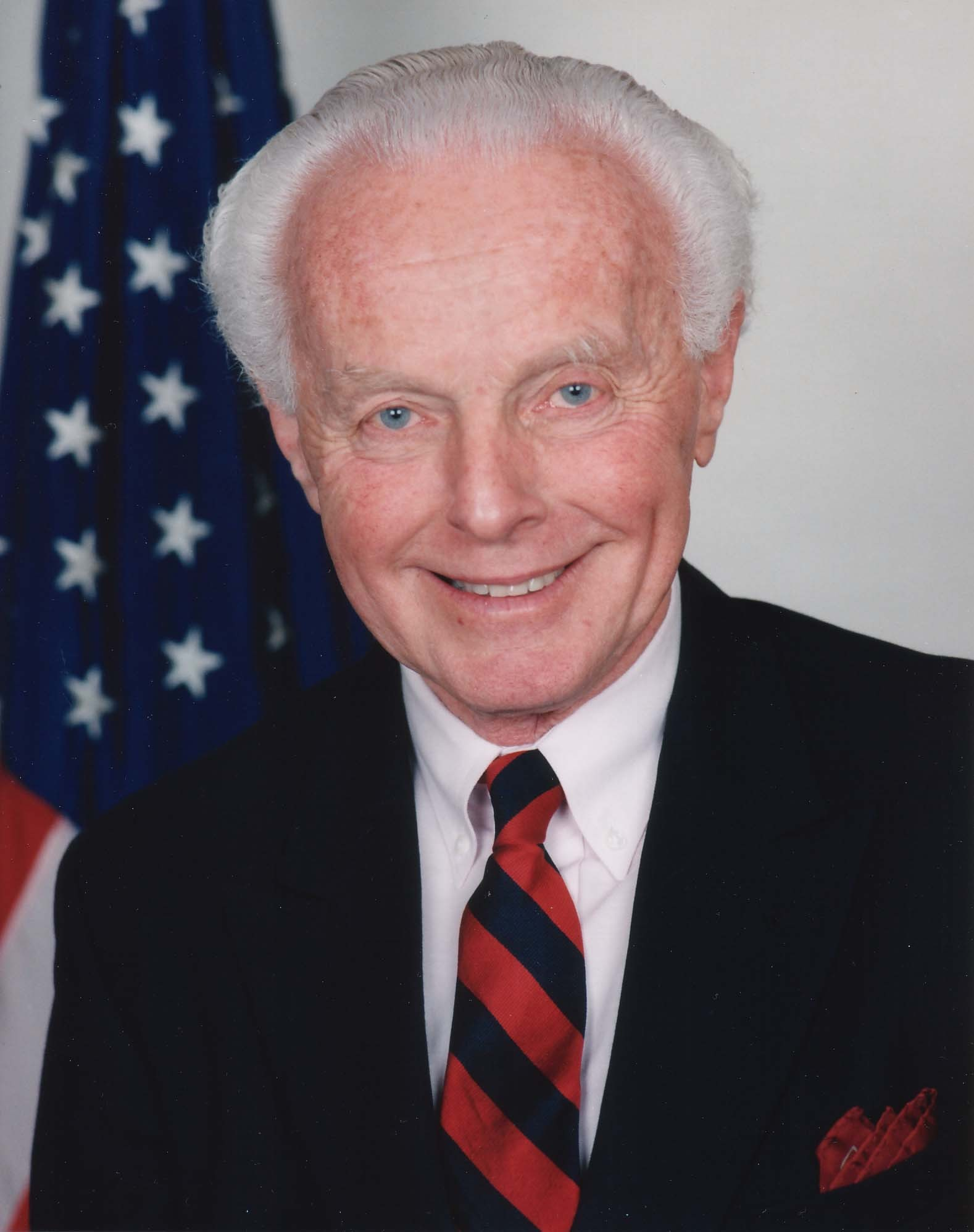
Tom Lantos, co-founder of the Congressional Human Rights Caucus

The Congressional Human Rights Caucus was founded in 1983 by Tom Lantos, a California Democrat, and John Porter, an Illinois Republican. Lantos was Hungarian by birth and had the distinction of being the only Holocaust survivor ever to serve in Congress.

In 1987, the caucus invited the 14th Dalai Lama to speak about the situation of Tibet. It was the first formal invitation to the Dalai Lama from a U.S. government organization. Lantos later alleged that two Tibetan nationalists were executed by China in retaliation for this visit.

On 31 October 2005, Lantos and the caucus helped arrange for Shan Burmese activist Charm Tong to visit the White House to discuss the Burmese political situation with President George W. Bush, National Security Advisor Stephen J. Hadley, and other senior officials. Charm Tong spoke with Bush about war rape and other women's rights issues in her home of Shan State. Following the meeting, Lantos predicted that Charm Tong's 50 minutes with Bush "would reverberate around the world". The Irrawaddy wrote in December of that year that lobbyists were attributing Bush's subsequent "outspokenness on Burma" to "the Charm Tong Effect".

In 2006, the caucus held hearings on the alleged collaboration of Google, Yahoo!, Microsoft, and Cisco with Internet censorship in the People's Republic of China. Members of the caucus asserted that the companies had agreed to block "politically sensitive terms" from their search engines. The companies refused to attend the hearings. A year later, Lantos excoriated CEO Jerry Yang for Yahoo's aiding the Chinese government in the arrest of dissident journalist Shi Tao, calling Yang and other executives "[moral] pygmies".

=== "Nurse Nayirah" incident ===
Lantos was a strong supporter of the 1991 Persian Gulf War. During the run-up to the war, the Congressional Human Rights Caucus hosted a young Kuwaiti woman identified only as "Nurse Nayirah", who told of horrific abuses by Iraqi soldiers, including the killing of Kuwaiti babies by taking them out of their incubators and leaving them to die on the cold floor of the hospital. Nayirah's testimony was widely publicized. That night, portions of the testimony aired on ABC's Nightline and NBC Nightly News reaching an estimated audience between 35 and 53 million Americans. Seven senators cited Nayirah's testimony in their speeches backing the use of force. President George H.W. Bush repeated the story at least ten times in the following weeks, and Lantos himself argued that Nayirah's account of the atrocities helped to stir American opinion in favor of participation in the Gulf War.

"Nurse Nayirah" was later revealed to be the daughter of the Kuwaiti ambassador to the United States, and her story was challenged by independent human rights monitors. Asked about his having allowed the girl to give testimony without identifying herself, and without her story having been corroborated, Lantos replied, "The notion that any of the witnesses brought to the caucus through the Kuwaiti Embassy would not be credible did not cross my mind... I have no basis for assuming that her story is not true, but the point goes beyond that. If one hypothesizes that the woman's story is fictitious from A to Z, that in no way diminishes the avalanche of human rights violations."

Lantos and John R. MacArthur, the foremost critic of the Nayirah issue, each had op-eds in The New York Times, in which each accused the other of distortion. MacArthur suggested that Lantos may have materially benefited from his having accommodated Nayirah. Nayirah was later revealed to have connections to lobbying firm Hill & Knowlton in the employ of Kuwaiti activist group Citizens for a Free Kuwait, a lobbying firm which also rented space to the Human Rights Caucus at a "reduced rate". The New York Times condemned Lantos's "lack of candor and lapse of judgment" in presenting her testimony without giving these facts as context, and called for a hearing by the House Ethics Committee.

=== Caucus leadership ===
Start	End	Chair	Co-Chair
1983	1995	Tom Lantos (D-CA)	John Porter (R-IL)
1995	2001	John Porter (R-IL)	Tom Lantos (D-CA)
2001	2007	Frank Wolf (R-VA)	Tom Lantos (D-CA)
2007	2008	Tom Lantos (D-CA)	Frank Wolf (R-VA)

== Tom Lantos Human Rights Commission (2008–Present) ==
Tom Lantos Human Rights Commission in the 118th United States Congress

=== Congressional institutionalization ===
Following Lantos's death from cancer in 2008, House Speaker Nancy Pelosi initiated a bill to reform the caucus as the "Tom Lantos Human Rights Commission"; the bill passed unanimously. The passage of H.R.1451 established the Tom Lantos Human Rights Commission and its mandate.

As established in H.R.1451:

- The Tom Lantos Human Rights Commission serves as an advisory, educational, and advocacy body for Members of the House of Representatives on issues of “internationally recognized human rights norms as enshrined in the Universal Declaration of Human Rights and other relevant international human rights instruments”.
- Its budget is administered through the House Committee on Foreign Affairs, however, the Commission itself is autonomous.
- The Commission has no legislative authority and no jurisdiction over legislation.
- Any Member of Congress can request to join the Commission.

The Tom Lantos Human Rights Commission is a unique body in the House of Representatives, and its function as established in the resolution is notably different from other commissions in the United States Congress, such as the Congressional-Executive Commission on China or the Commission on Security and Cooperation in Europe. Though the resolution states that the Tom Lantos Human Rights Commission must collaborate with the Senate and the Executive branch, the Commission itself is composed only of Members of the House of Representatives. Members are not appointed to the Commission, but are able to join by request at any time, similar to a caucus. The Commission also does not compile an annual report. It is the only body in the House of Representatives that is intended to frame all issues through the lens of international human rights norms.

Similarly, there are significant differences between the Tom Lantos Human Rights Commission and committees in the House of Representatives. Most notably, the nonpartisan structure of the Commission grants both parties equal power within the Commission, regardless of which side is in the majority or minority. Unlike a committee which has a Chair from the majority and a Ranking Member from the minority, the Commission is led by two Co-Chairs who have equal say. The leadership of the Commission is composed of one Co-Chair and four Executive Committee Members from each party. The two Co-Chairs and eight Members of the Executive Committee are appointed by the Speaker and Minority Leader.

=== Historical leadership ===
Start	End	Democratic Co-Chair	Republican Co-Chair
2008	2015	Jim McGovern (D-MA)	Frank Wolf (R-VA)
2015	2017	Jim McGovern (D-MA)	Joe Pitts (R-PA)
2017	2019	Jim McGovern (D-MA)	Randy Hultgren (R-IL)
2019	present	Jim McGovern (D-MA)	Chris Smith (R-NJ)

=== Executive Committee Members, 117th Congress ===
Majority	Minority
Alan Lowenthal, California; Ilhan Omar, Minnesota; Jamie Raskin, Maryland; Norma Torres, California	N/A

=== Historical executive committee membership ===
==== 116th Congress ====
Majority	Minority
Jim McGovern, Massachusetts, Chair; Deb Haaland, New Mexico; Alan Lowenthal, California; Jamie Raskin, Maryland; Norma Torres, California	Chris Smith, New Jersey, Co-Chair; Gus Bilirakis, Florida; Andy Harris, Maryland; Darin LaHood, Illinois; Cathy McMorris Rodgers, Washington

== See also ==
- Human rights law
- Universal Declaration of Human Rights
