= In Order to Live =

2015 autobiography by Yeonmi Park

In Order to Live: A North Korean Girl's Journey to Freedom
- Author: Yeonmi Park
- Genre: Autobiography
- Publisher: Penguin Press
- Publication date: September 2015
- ISBN: 978-1-59420-679-5
- OCLC: 1198292120

In Order to Live: A North Korean Girl's Journey to Freedom is a 2015 autobiography by Yeonmi Park. As of July 2023, the over 100,000 copies of the book had been sold.
