= Meat grinder (disambiguation) =

A meat grinder is a culinary tool for grinding (finely shredding into bits) meat.

Meat grinder may also refer to:

- Meat Grinder, 2009 Thai horror film
- "Meat Grinder," a song by Madvillain from their album Madvillainy
- Saddam Hussein's alleged shredder, described as a meat grinder for people
- Colloquial term for attrition warfare or human wave attacks
  - Battles of Rzhev during the World War II, nicknamed the "meat-grinder" by veterans and historians
  - Operation Killer during the Korean War, nicknamed the "meat-grinder" by popular press for carnage experienced by Chinese forces
