= Atrocity propaganda =

Spreading lies about enemy crimes

Bataan Death March in American propaganda

Atrocity propaganda is the spreading of information about the crimes committed by an enemy, which can be factual, but often includes or features deliberate fabrications or exaggerations. This can involve photographs, videos, illustrations, interviews, and other forms of information presentation or reporting.

The inherently violent nature of war means that exaggeration and invention of atrocities often becomes the main staple of propaganda. Patriotism is often not enough to make people hate the enemy, and propaganda is also necessary. "So great are the psychological resistances to war in modern nations", wrote Harold Lasswell, "that every war must appear to be a war of defense against a menacing, murderous aggressor. There must be no ambiguity about who the public is to hate." Human testimony may be unreliable even in ordinary circumstances, but in wartime, it can be further muddled by bias, sentiment, and misguided patriotism.

According to Paul Linebarger, atrocity propaganda leads to real atrocities, as it incites the enemy into committing more atrocities, and, by heating up passions, it increases the chances of one's own side committing atrocities, in revenge for the ones reported in propaganda. Atrocity propaganda might also lead the public to mistrust reports of actual atrocities. In January 1944, Arthur Koestler wrote of his frustration at trying to communicate what he had witnessed in Nazi-occupied Europe: the legacy of anti-German stories during World War I, many of which were debunked in the postwar years, meant that these reports were received with considerable amounts of skepticism.

Like propaganda, atrocity rumors detailing exaggerated or invented crimes perpetrated by enemies are also circulated to vilify the opposing side. The application of atrocity propaganda is not limited to times of conflict but can be implemented to sway public opinion and create a casus belli to declare war.

== Techniques ==
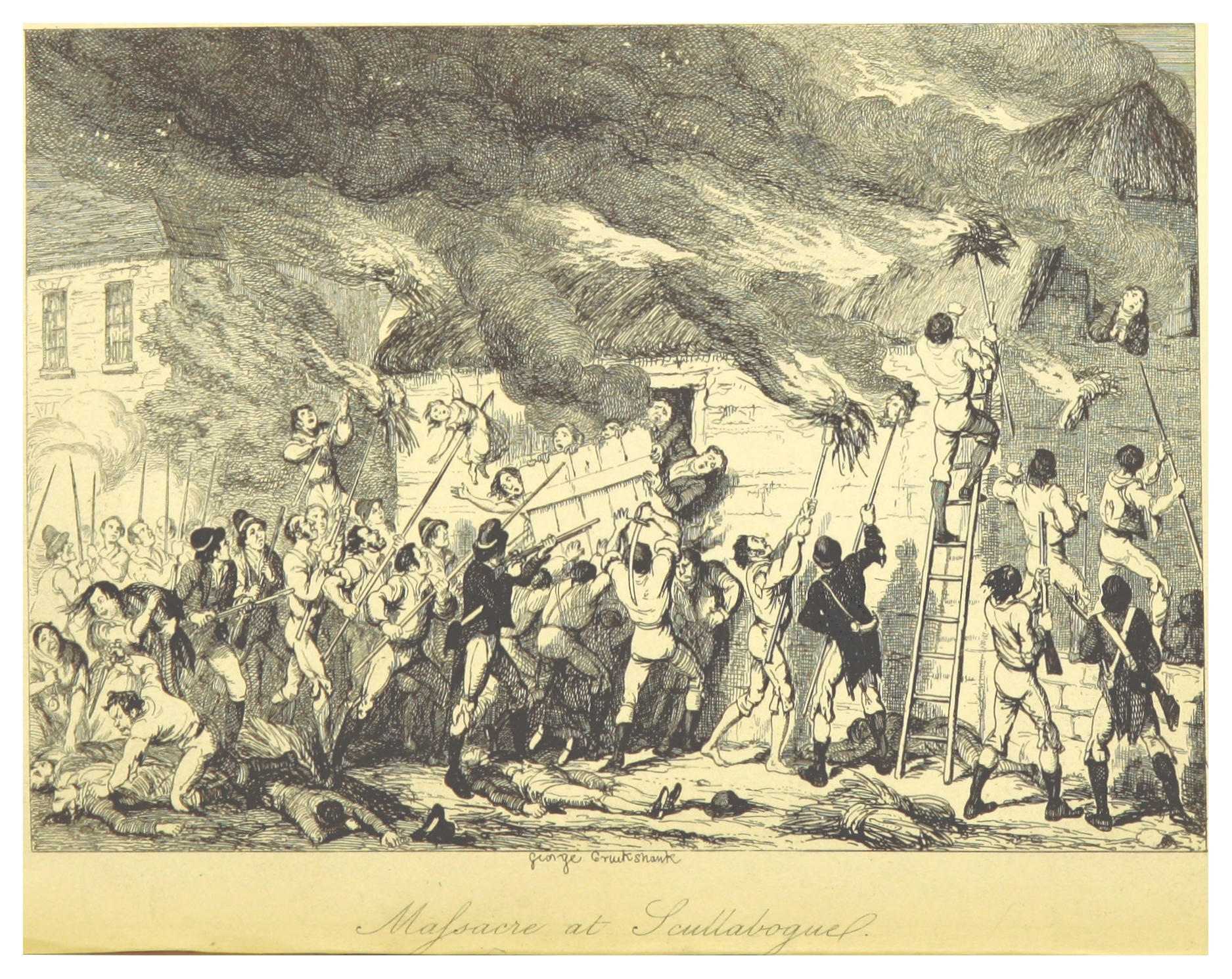
Irish Catholic atrocities committed during the Irish Rebellion of 1798, illustrated by British artist George Cruikshank (1845).

By establishing a baseline lie and painting the enemy as a monster, atrocity propaganda serves as an intelligence function, since it wastes the time and resources of the enemy's counterintelligence services to defend itself. The propagandists' goal is to influence perceptions, attitudes, opinions, and policies; often targeting officials at all levels of government. Atrocity propaganda is violent, gloomy, and portrays doom to help rile up and get the public excited. It dehumanizes the enemy, making them easier to kill. Wars have become more serious, and less gentlemanly; the enemy must now be taken into account not merely as a man, but as a fanatic. So, "falsehood is a recognized and extremely useful weapon in warfare, and every country uses it quite deliberately to deceive its own people, attract neutrals, and to mislead the enemy." Harold Lasswell saw it as a handy rule for arousing hate, and that "if at first they do not enrage, use an atrocity. It has been employed with unvarying success in every conflict known to man."

The extent and devastation of World War I required nations to keep morale high. Propaganda was used here to mobilize hatred against the enemy, convince the population of the justness of one's own cause, enlist the active support and cooperation of neutral countries, and strengthen the support of one's allies. The goal was to make the enemy appear savage, barbaric, and inhumane.

== Atrocity propaganda in history ==
=== Before the 20th century ===
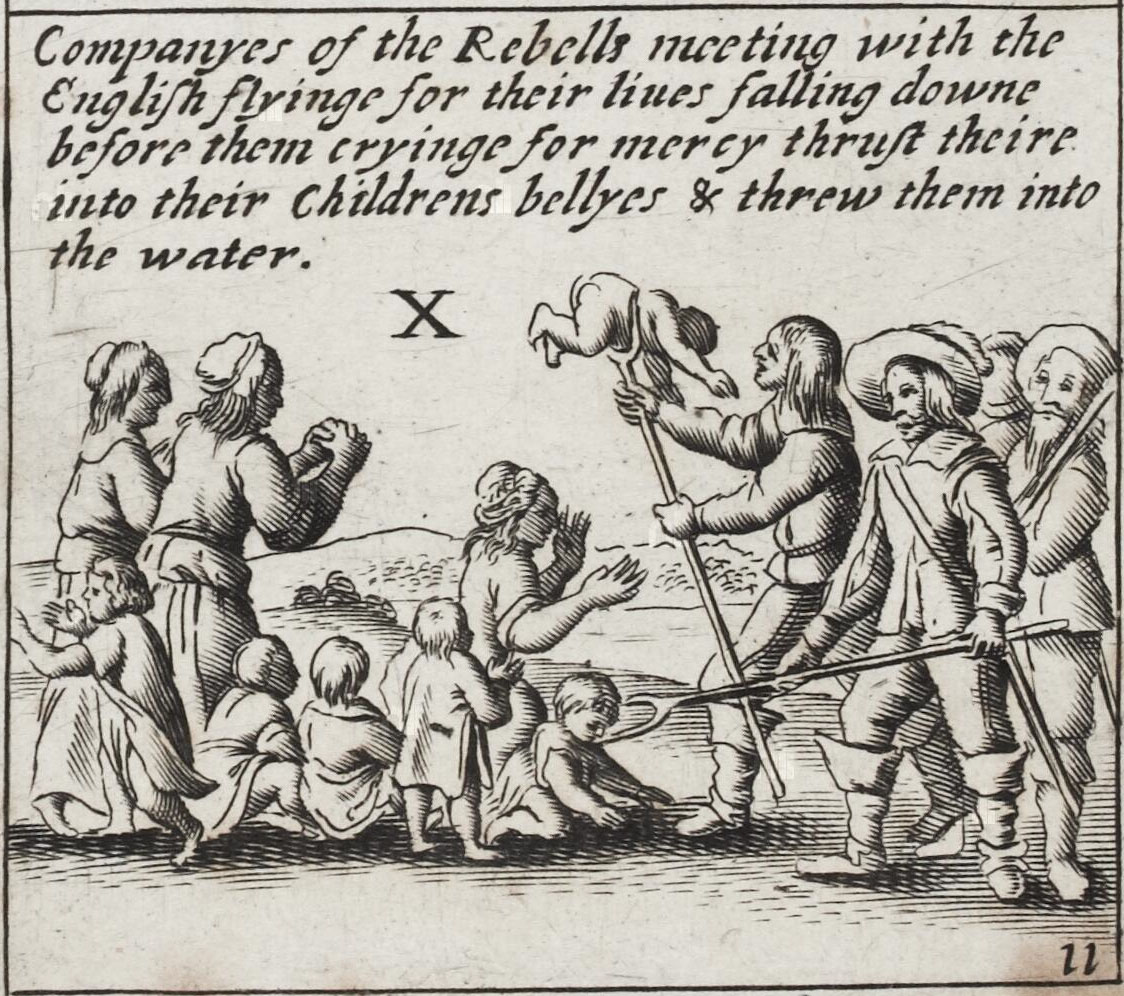
Engraving by Wenceslaus Hollar depicting alleged atrocities committed by rebels during the Irish Rebellion of 1641

In a 1095 sermon at Clermont, Urban II promoted the Crusades by claiming that Muslims "had ravaged the churches of God in the Eastern provinces, circumcised Christian men, violated women, and carried out the most unspeakable torture before killing them." Urban II's sermon succeeded in mobilizing popular enthusiasm in support of the People's Crusade. Lurid tales purporting to unveil Jewish atrocities against Christians were also widespread during the Middle Ages. The claim that Jews kidnapped and murdered Christian children to consume their blood during Passover became known as blood libel.

During the Irish Rebellion of 1641, several accounts of atrocities committed by Irish rebels against English settlers in Ireland were published in England. Although these accounts were often exaggerated, "the English perception that the Irish... were routinely committing war crimes–was very real." Many in England reacted to these accounts "with calls for sharp reprisals". Such accounts were used by Oliver Cromwell to justify his conquest of Ireland in 1659, including the massacres that followed the sieges of Drogheda and Wexford.

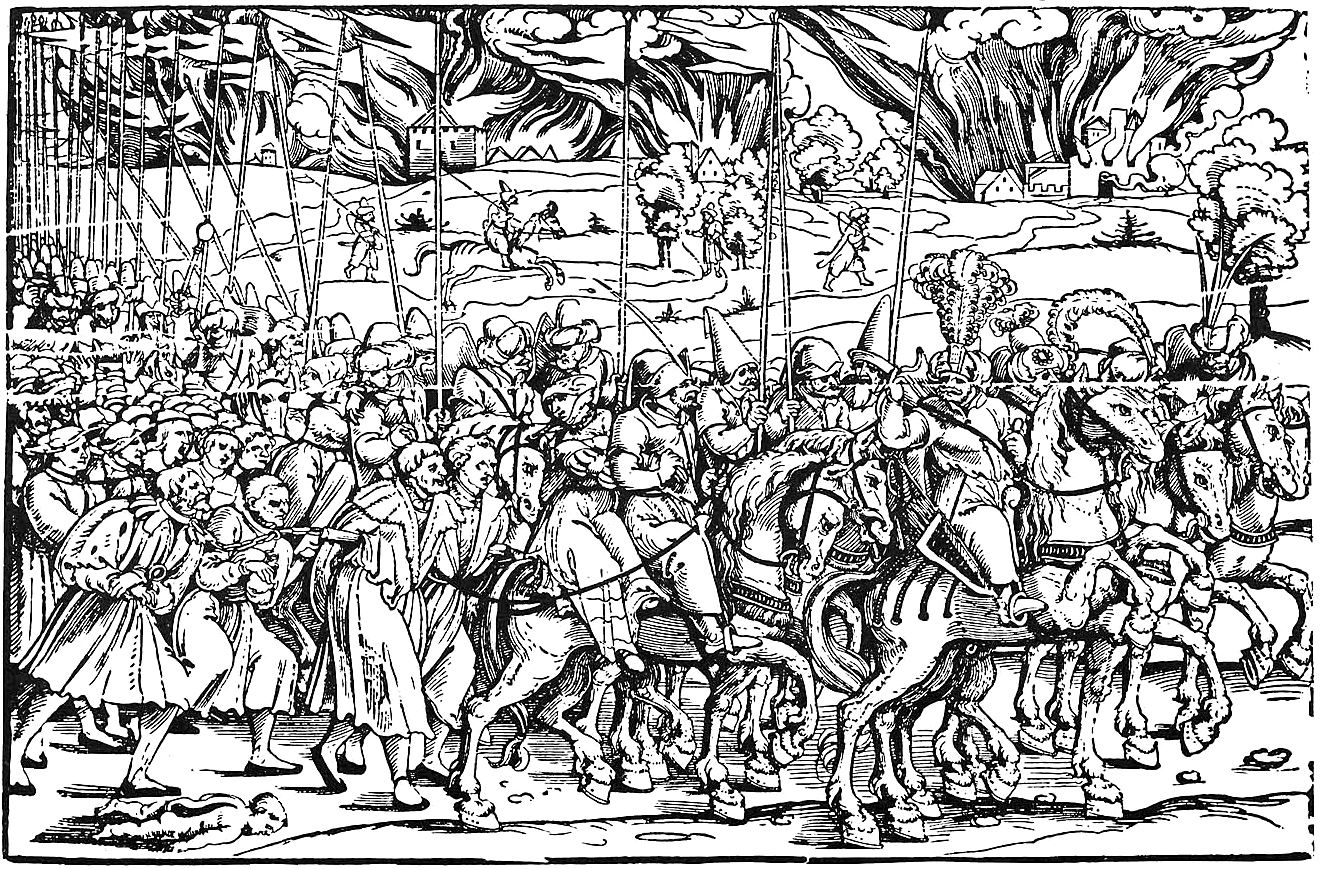
Ottoman Turks with Christian slaves from the Ottoman expansion into the Balkans, woodcut by Erhard Schön, c. 1530

In 1782, Benjamin Franklin wrote and published an article purporting to reveal a letter between a British Indian agent and the governor of Canada, listing atrocities supposedly perpetrated by British-allied Native Americans against white colonists, including detailed accounts of the scalping of women and children. The account was a fabrication, published in the expectation that it would be reprinted by newspapers in Britain and therefore sway British public opinion in favor of peace with the United States.

During the Indian Rebellion of 1857, stories began to circulate in the British and Anglo-Indian press of alleged atrocities committed by rebels, especially rapes of European women, in places like Cawnpore; a subsequent official inquiry found no evidence for any of the claims. In the lead up to the Spanish–American War, the newspapers of Joseph Pulitzer and William Randolph Hearst published accounts of Spanish atrocities against Cubans. While occasionally true, the majority of these stories were fabrications meant to boost sales and promote American support for war with Spain.

=== 20th century ===
==== World War I ====
It was reported that some thirty to thirty-five German soldiers entered the house of David Tordens, a carter, in Sempst; they bound him, and then five or six of them assaulted and ravished in his presence his thirteen-year-old daughter, and afterwards fixed her on bayonets. After this horrible deed, they bayoneted his nine-year-old boy and then shot his wife.

—

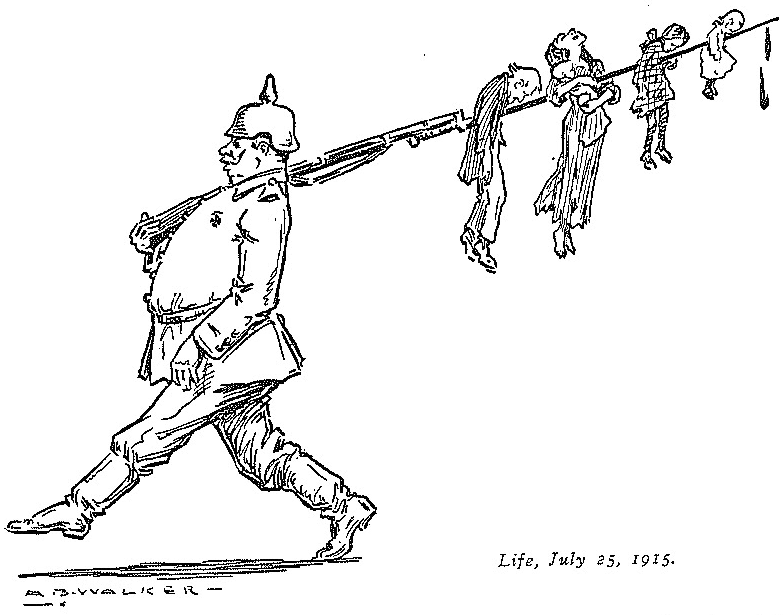
Stories of German soldiers impaling children on their bayonets were based on extremely flimsy evidence.

Atrocity propaganda was widespread during World War I, when it was used by all belligerents, playing a major role in creating the wave of patriotism that characterised the early stages of the war. British propaganda is regarded as having made the most extensive use of fictitious atrocities to promote the war effort.

One such story was that German soldiers were deliberately mutilating Belgian babies by cutting off their hands, in some versions even eating them. Eyewitness accounts told of having seen a similarly mutilated baby. As Arthur Ponsonby later pointed out, in reality a baby would be very unlikely to survive similar wounds without immediate medical attention.

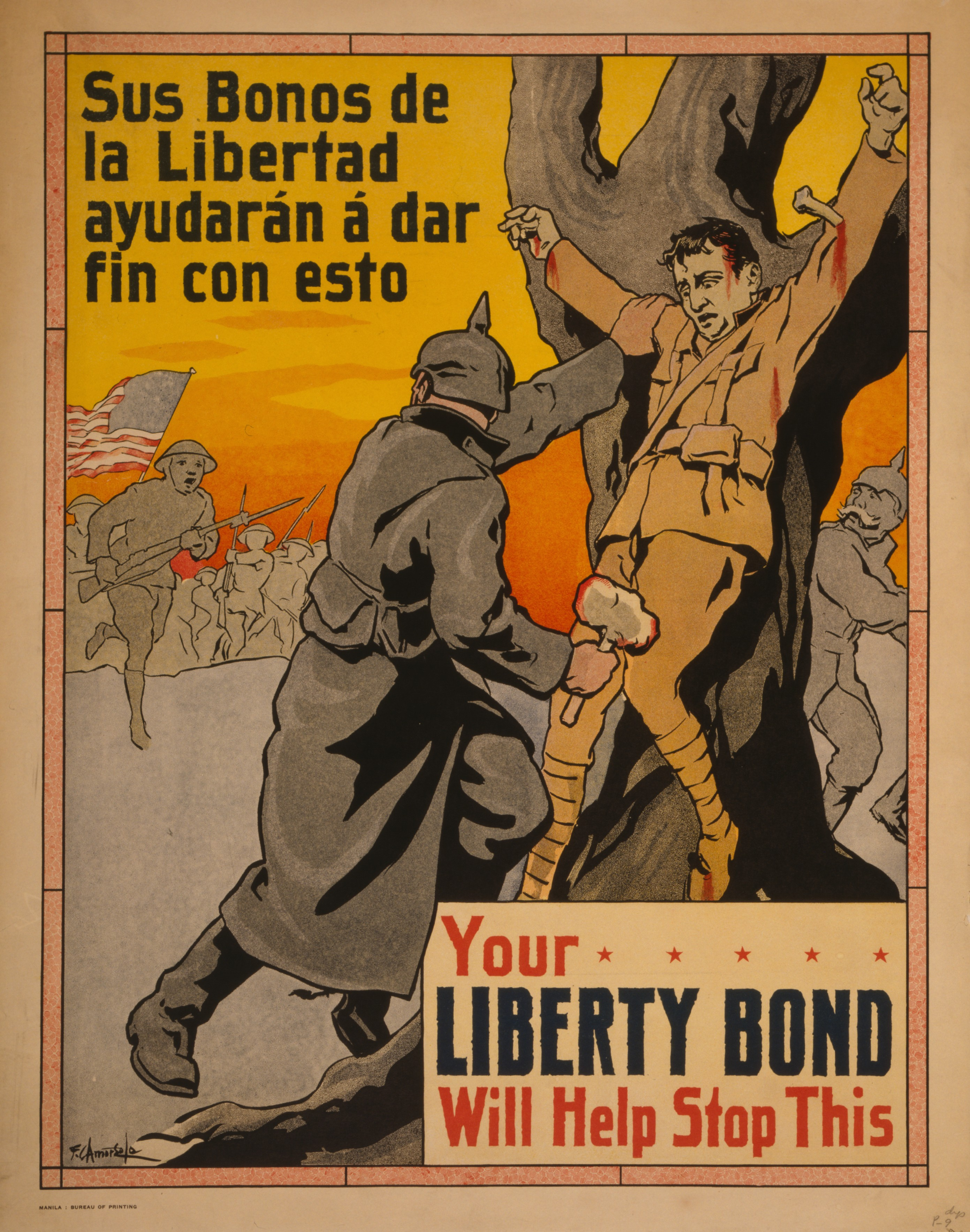
Poster showing German soldiers nailing a man to a tree, as US soldiers come to his rescue, 1917

Another atrocity story involved a Canadian soldier, who had supposedly been crucified with bayonets by the Germans (see The Crucified Soldier). Many Canadians claimed to have witnessed the event, yet they all provided different version of how it had happened. The Canadian high command investigated the matter, concluding that it was untrue.

Other reports circulated of Belgian women, often nuns, who had their breasts cut off by the Germans. A story about German corpse factories, where bodies of German soldiers were supposedly turned into glycerine for weapons, or food for hogs and poultry, was published in a Times article on April 17, 1917. In the postwar years, investigations in Britain and France revealed that these stories were false.

The Germans Arrive by the American artist George Bellows depicting the 1914 German atrocities in Belgium.

In 1915, the British government asked Viscount Bryce, one of the best-known contemporary historians, to head the Committee on Alleged German Outrages which was to investigate the allegations of atrocities. The report purported to prove many of the claims, and was widely published in the United States, where it contributed to convince the American public to enter the war. Few at the time criticised the accuracy of the report. After the war, historians who sought to examine the documentation for the report were told that the files had mysteriously disappeared. Surviving correspondence between the members of the committee revealed they actually had severe doubts about the credibility of the tales they investigated.

German newspapers published allegations that Armenians were murdering Muslims in Turkey. Several newspapers reported that 150,000 Muslims had been murdered by Armenians in Van province. An article about the 1908 Revolution (sometimes called the "Turkish national awakening") published by a German paper accused the "Ottomans of the Christian tribe" (meaning the Armenians) of taking up arms after the revolution and killing Muslims.

==== World War II ====
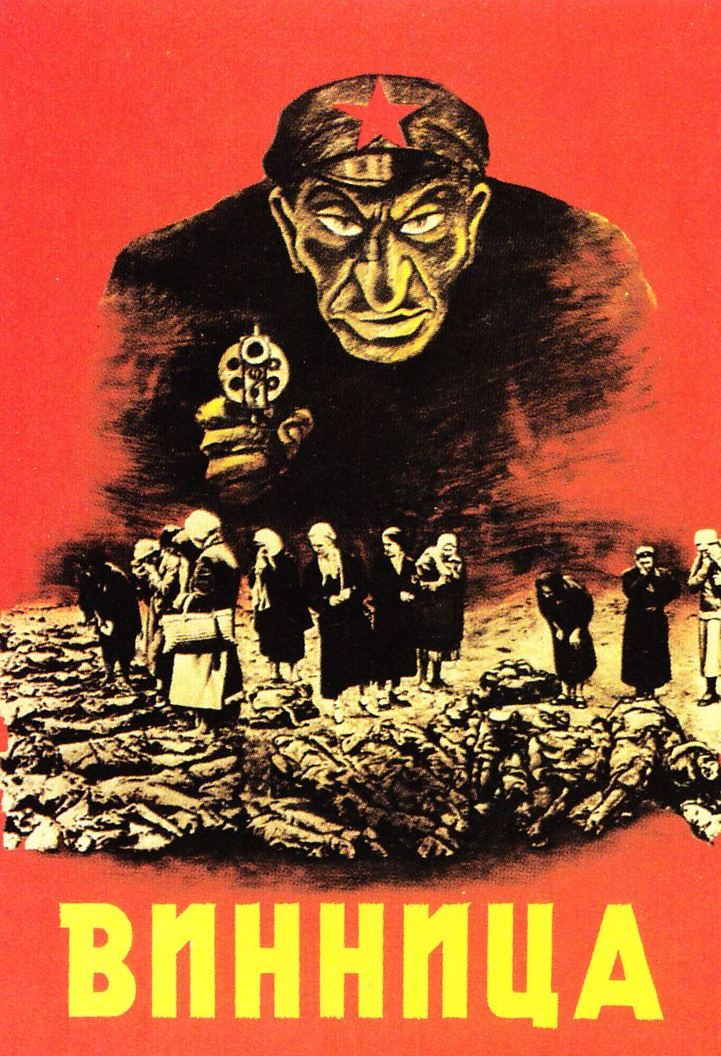
German propaganda poster about the Vinnytsia massacre in Ukraine, c. 1943; the NKVD gunman has stereotypically Jewish features, in accordance with the Nazi idea of "Judeo-Bolshevism".

During World War II, atrocity propaganda was not used on the same scale as in World War I, as by then it had long been discredited by its use during the previous conflict. There were exceptions in some propaganda films, such as Hitler's Children, Women in Bondage, and Enemy of Women, which portrayed the Germans (as opposed to just Nazis) as enemies of civilization, abusing women and the innocent. Hitler's Children is now spoken of as "lurid", while Women in Bondage is described as a low-budget exploitation film; the latter carries a disclaimer that "everything in the film is true", but facts are often distorted or sensationalized.

However, the Germans often claimed that largely accurate descriptions of German atrocities were just "atrocity propaganda" and a few Western leaders were thus hesitant to believe early reports of Nazi atrocities, especially the existence of concentration camps, death camps and the many massacres perpetrated by German troops and SS Einsatzgruppen during the war. Winston Churchill and Franklin Roosevelt knew from radio intercepts via Bletchley Park that such massacres were widespread in Poland and other east European territories. Moreover, the existence of concentration camps like Dachau was well known both in Germany and throughout the world as a result of German propaganda itself, as well as many exposures by escapees and others from 1933 onwards. Their discovery towards the end of the war shocked many in the west, especially of Bergen-Belsen and Dachau by allied soldiers, but the atrocities carried out there were amply supported by the facts on the ground. The Nuremberg trials in 1945/6 confirmed the extent of genocide, Nazi medical experimentation, massacres and torture on a very wide scale. Later Nuremberg trials produced abundant evidence of atrocities carried out on prisoners and captives.

The Germans themselves made heavy use of atrocity propaganda, both before the war and during it. Violence between ethnic Germans and the Poles, such as the 1939 Bloody Sunday massacre, was characterised as barbaric slaughter of the German population by the subhuman Poles, and used to justify the genocide of the Polish population according to the Nazi Generalplan Ost. Late in the war, Nazi propaganda used exaggerated depictions of real or planned Allied crimes against Germany, such as the bombing of Dresden, the Nemmersdorf massacre, and the Morgenthau Plan for the deindustrialisation of Germany to frighten and enrage German civilians into resistance. Hitler's last directive, given fifteen days before his suicide, proclaimed the postwar intentions of the "Jewish Bolsheviks" to be the total genocide of the German people, with the men sent off to labour camps in Siberia and the women and girls made into military sex slaves.

==== Soviet–Afghan War ====
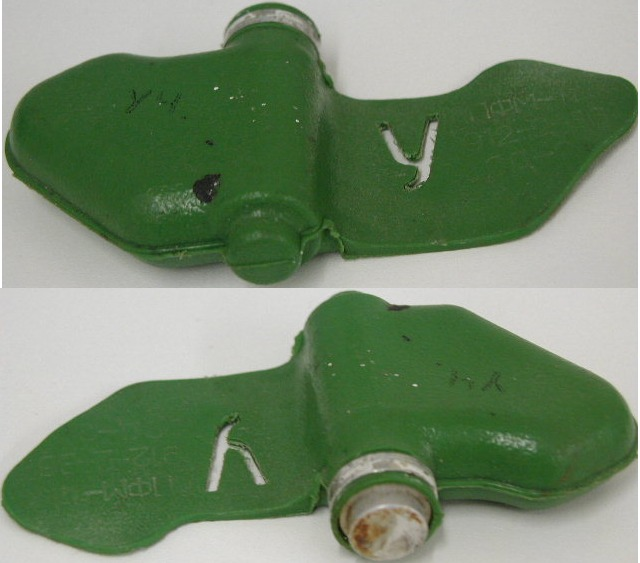
The PFM-1 mine was claimed to have been deliberately designed to attract children

According to a 1985 UN report backed by Western countries, the KGB had deliberately designed mines to look like toys, and deployed them against Afghan children during the Soviet–Afghan War.

Newspapers such as the New York Times ran stories denouncing the "ghastly, deliberate crippling of children" and noting that while the stories had been met with skepticism by the public, they had been proven by the "incontrovertible testimony" of a UN official testifying the existence of booby-trap toys in the shape of harmonicas, radios, or birds.

The story likely originated from the PFM-1 mine, which was made from brightly colored plastic and had been indirectly copied from the American BLU-43 Dragontooth design. The Mine Action Coordination Center of Afghanistan reported that the allegations "gained a life for obvious journalist reasons", but otherwise had no basis in reality.

==== Yugoslav Wars ====
In November 1991, a Serbian photographer claimed to have seen the corpses of 41 children, which had allegedly been killed by Croatian soldiers. The story was published by media outlets worldwide, but the photographer later admitted to fabricating his account. The story of this atrocity was blamed for inciting a desire for vengeance in Serbian rebels, who summarily executed Croatian fighters who were captured near the alleged crime scene the day after the forged report was published.

==== Gulf War ====
Iraq invaded Kuwait in August 1990. On October 10, 1990, a young Kuwaiti girl known only as "Nayirah" appeared in front of a congressional committee and testified that she witnessed the mass murdering of infants, when Iraqi soldiers had snatched them out of hospital incubators and threw them on the floor to die. Her testimony became a lead item in newspapers, radio and TV all over the US. The story was eventually exposed as a fabrication in December 1992, in a CBC-TV program called To Sell a War. Nayirah was revealed to be the daughter of Kuwait's ambassador to the United States, and had not actually seen the "atrocities" she described take place; the PR firm Hill & Knowlton, which had been hired by the Kuwaiti government to devise a PR campaign to increase American public support for a war against Iraq, had heavily promoted her testimony.

=== 21st century ===
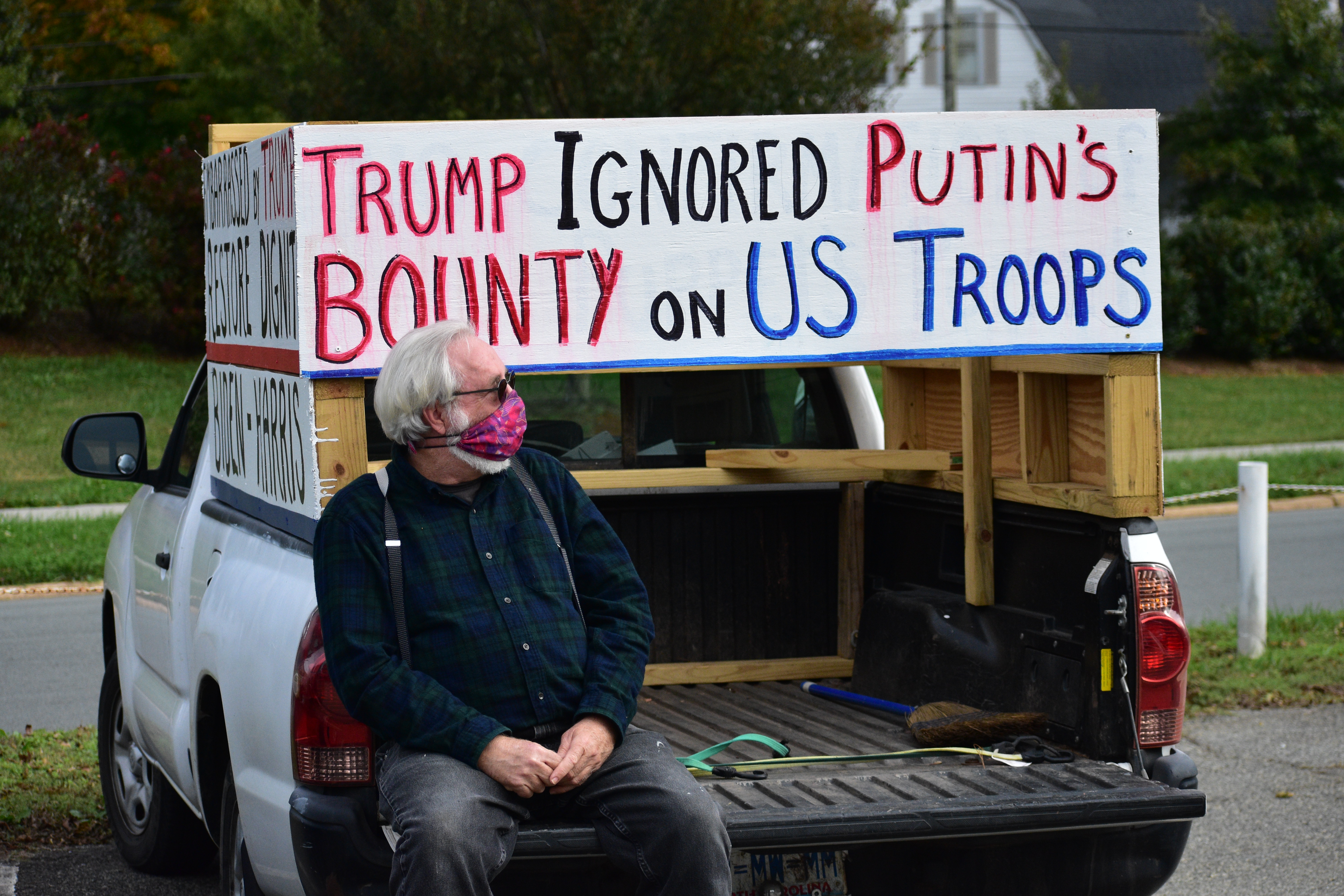
Sign informing about alleged Russian bounty program in Afghanistan, United States, 2020

==== Iraq War ====
In the runup to the 2003 invasion of Iraq, press stories appeared in the United Kingdom and United States of a plastic shredder or wood chipper into which Saddam and Qusay Hussein fed opponents of their Baathist rule. These stories attracted worldwide attention and boosted support for military action, in stories with titles such as "See men shredded, then say you don't back war". A year later, it was determined there was no evidence to support the existence of such a machine.

In 2004, former Marine Staff Sgt. Jimmy Massey claimed that he and other Marines intentionally killed dozens of innocent Iraqi civilians, including a 4-year-old girl. His allegations were published by news organizations worldwide, but none of the five journalists – embedded with the troops and approved by the Pentagon – who covered his battalion said they saw reckless or indiscriminate shooting of civilians. The St. Louis Post-Dispatch dismissed his claim as "either demonstrably false or exaggerated".

In July 2003 an Iraqi woman, Jumana Hanna, testified that she had been subjected to inhumane treatment by Baathist policemen during two years of imprisonment, including being subjected to electric shocks and raped repeatedly. The story appeared on the front page of The Washington Post, and was presented to the Senate Foreign Relations Committee by then-Deputy Defense Secretary Paul D. Wolfowitz. In January 2005, articles in Esquire and The Washington Post concluded that none of her allegations could be verified, and that her accounts contained grave inconsistencies. Her husband, who she claimed had been executed in the same prison where she was tortured, was in fact still alive.

==== Other cases ====
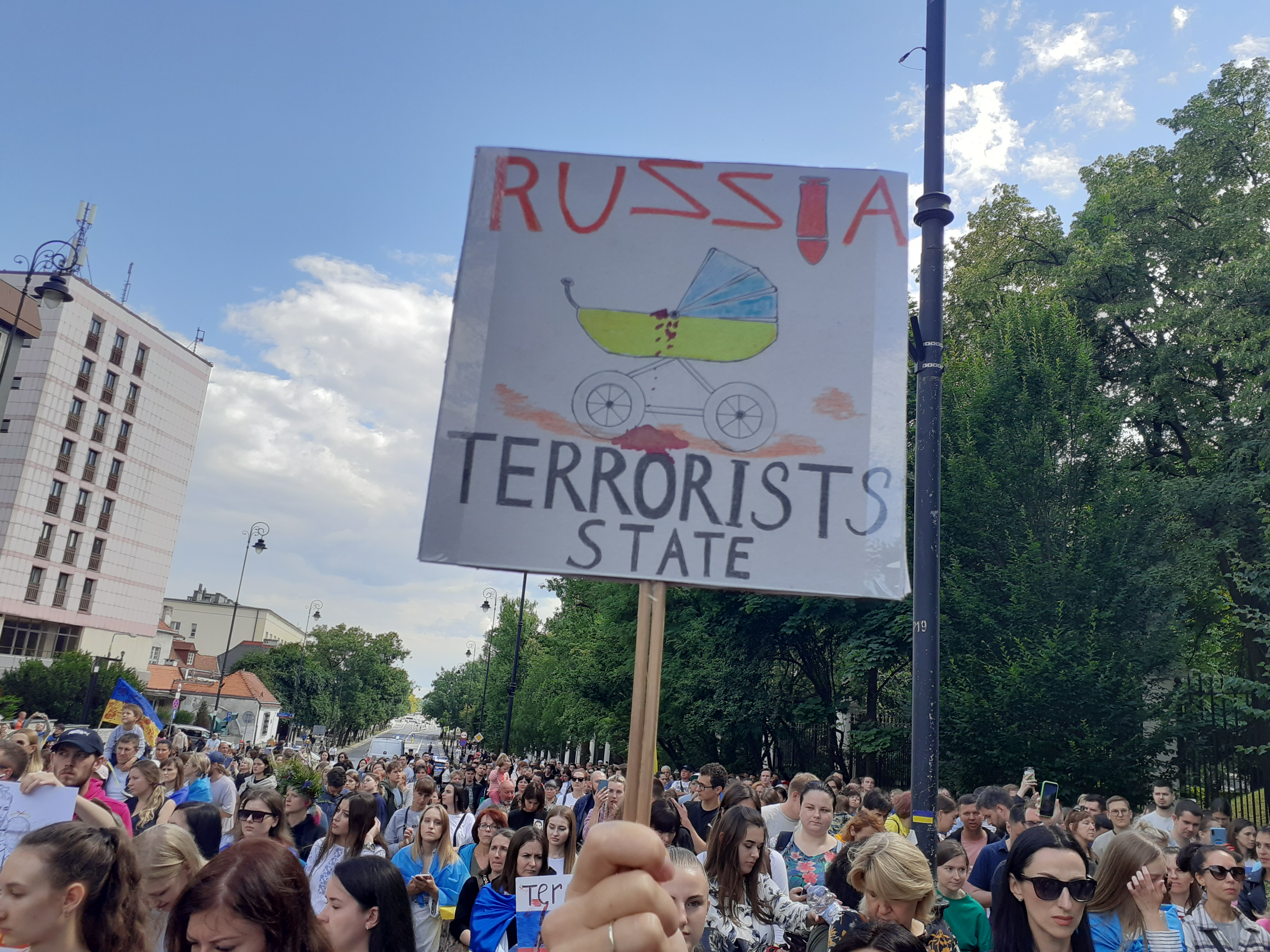
Protest in front of the Russian embassy in Poland with a sign calling Russia a "terrorist state", July 2022

During the Battle of Jenin, Palestinian officials claimed there was a massacre of civilians in the refugee camp, which was proven false by subsequent international investigations.

During the 2010 South Kyrgyzstan ethnic clashes, a rumor spread among ethnic Kyrgyz that Uzbek men had broken into a local women's dormitory and raped several Kyrgyz women. Local police never provided any confirmation that such an assault occurred.

During the Libyan Civil War, Libyan media was reporting atrocities by Muammar Gaddafi loyalists, who were ordered to perform mass "Viagra-fueled rapes" (see 2011 Libyan rape allegations). A later investigation by Amnesty International has failed to find evidence for these allegations, and in many cases has discredited them, as the rebels were found to have deliberately lied about the claims.

In July 2014, the Russian public broadcaster Channel One aired a report claiming that Ukrainian soldiers in Sloviansk had crucified a three-year-old boy to a board, and later dragged his mother with a tank, causing her death. The account of the only witness interviewed for the report was not corroborated by anyone else, and other media have been unable to confirm the story, despite claims in the testimony that many of the city's inhabitants had been forced to watch the killings. A reporter for Novaya Gazeta similarly failed to find any other witnesses in the city.

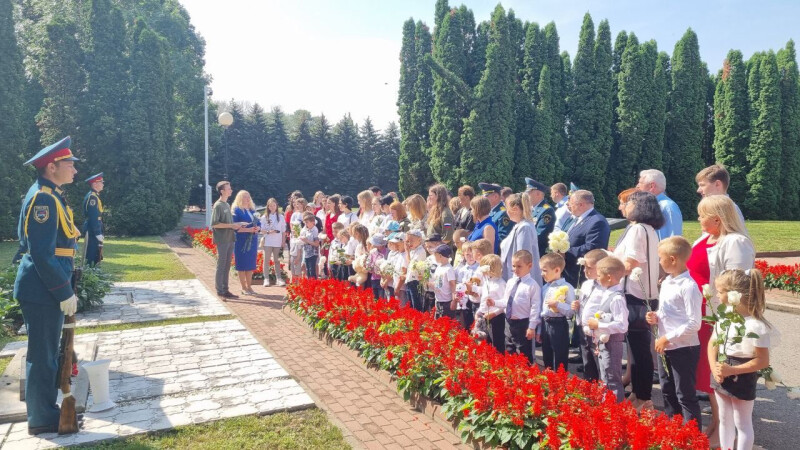
Russian children at a memorial to children allegedly killed by Ukrainian forces in Donbas, a state-sponsored event in Kursk in July 2023

In his announcement of the Russian invasion of Ukraine, Russian President Vladimir Putin baselessly claimed that Ukraine was carrying out genocide in the mainly Russian-speaking Donbas region. In April 2022, Canada's Communications Security Establishment said there was a coordinated effort by the Russian government to promote false reports about Ukraine harvesting organs from dead soldiers, women and children. On 21 September 2022, Vladimir Putin announced a partial mobilisation. To justify Russia's invasion of Ukraine and mobilization, Putin claimed in his address to the Russian audience that the "terror and violence" against the Ukrainian people by the pro-Western "Nazi" regime in Kiev had "taken increasingly horrific, barbaric forms," Ukrainians had been turned into "cannon fodder," and therefore Russia had no choice but to defend "our beloved" in Ukraine.

In the aftermath of the 2023 October 7 attacks, Israel was accused of spreading atrocity propaganda to justify the Gaza war and genocide. The alleged propaganda included claims of systematic rape (such as a New York Times piece titled Screams Without Words) and of babies being beheaded and burned.

== See also ==
- Crucified boy
- Falsehood in War-Time
- False flag
- Fear mongering
- Media coverage of North Korea
- Moral panic
- Sensationalism
- Yellow journalism

== Bibliography ==
- Cull, Nicholas John; Culbert, David Holbrook; Welch, David (2003). Propaganda and Mass Persuasion: A Historical Encyclopedia, 1500 to the Present. ABC-CLIO. pp. 23–25. ISBN 1576078205.
- Ponsonby, Arthur (1928). Falsehood in Wartime. Containing an Assortment of Lies Circulated Throughout the Nations during the Great War. New York: E.P. Dutton & co., p. 128.
