= Maryanne Vollers =

American writer

Maryanne Vollers is an American author, journalist and ghostwriter. Her first book, Ghosts of Mississippi, was a finalist in non-fiction for the 1995 National Book Award. Her many collaborations include the memoirs of Hillary Clinton, Dr. Jerri Nielsen, Sissy Spacek, Ashley Judd, and Billie Jean King. Her second book on domestic terrorism, Lone Wolf: Eric Rudolph – Murder, Myth, and the Pursuit of an American Outlaw, was published in 2006. A former editor at Rolling Stone, she has written articles for publications such as Esquire, GQ, Sports Illustrated, Time, and The New York Times Magazine.

== Life ==
Vollers was born in Yorktown Heights, New York, the daughter of a New York City fire chief and a court clerk. She attended Yorktown High School, and graduated from Brown University in Providence, RI in 1977. She has lived in Nairobi, Kenya, and Johannesburg, South Africa, where she worked as a Time magazine stringer, radio newscaster, and field producer for NBC News, covering wars, politics, health and cultural issues across the continent and around the world.

Once back in the states, Vollers covered domestic terrorism, including articles on the Oklahoma City Bombing, the militia movement, anti-abortion violence, the trial of white supremacist Byron de La Beckwith for the murder of Medgar Evers, which resulted in her book, Ghosts of Mississippi, followed a decade later by Lone Wolf, on the Olympic Park and abortion clinic bomber, Eric Rudolph.

Now based in Montana, she and her husband, documentary photographer, director, and producer William Campbell create news features and documentaries on political, social and environmental issues. Their PBS-ITVS documentary, Wolves in Paradise, was about the human costs and benefits of the reintroduction of wolves in the Yellowstone region.

== Work with Yeonmi Park ==
Vollers co-authored the biography of North Korean defector Yeonmi Park, whose claims about her life as a child in North Korea have been questioned by journalists, professors of Korean studies, and fellow North Korean defectors. The 2015 book titled In Order to Live: A North Korean Girl's Journey to Freedom – written in English and published in the United States – contained a different and more negative account of her life in North Korea than the stories Park had previously told to audiences in South Korea.

Before the book was published, an SBS journalist who had previously worked with Park on a documentary found numerous inconsistencies in Park's stories of life in Korea. Vollers defended Park from these accusations, stating that most of Park's jumbled recollections were due to her not yet being fluent in English, and that she was being targeted by a North Korean government smear campaign. A 2023 article in The Washington Post similarly found inconsistencies in many of Park's stories about life in North Korea.

== Works ==
- All In: Billie Jean King, An Autobiography; Knopf, 2021 (collaborator).
- In Order to Live: A North Korean Girl's Journey to Freedom; by Yeonmi Park with Maryanne Vollers, Penguin Random House, 2015.
- Money: Master the Game, by Tony Robbins, 2014 (collaborator)
- My Extraordinary Ordinary Life; by Sissy Spacek with Maryanne Vollers, Hyperion 2012.
- All That is Bitter and Sweet: A Memoir; by Ashley Judd with Maryanne Vollers, Ballantine, 2011.
- Lone Wolf: Eric Rudolph: Murder, Myth and the Pursuit of an American Outlaw; by Maryanne Vollers. HarperCollins Publishers, November 2006.)
- Living History, by Hillary Rodham Clinton, Simon & Schuster, 2003, (collaborator).
- Profiles in Courage for Our Time, edited by Caroline Kennedy, Hyperion Books, 2002; (Contributor).
- Ice Bound: A Doctor's Incredible Battle for Survival at the South Pole; by Jerri Nielsen with Maryanne Vollers; Talk Miramax, 2001.
- Ghosts of Mississippi: The Murder of Medgar Evers, the Trials of Byron De La Beckwith, and the Haunting of the New South; by Maryanne Vollers, Little Brown, 1995.

== Awards ==
- National Book Award, finalist, nonfiction: Ghosts of Mississippi, 1995
- Robert F. Kennedy Book Award, finalist, 1995.
- New York Public Library Helen Bernstein Award for Excellence in Journalism, finalist, 1996.
- The Gustavus Meyers Human Rights Award, 1996.
