= Now On My Way to Meet You =

2011– South Korean variety show

- Genre: Variety show
- Created by: Lee Jin-min
- Presented by: Nam Hee-suk; Kim Jong-min
- Country of origin: South Korea
- Original language: Korean
- No. of seasons: 7
- No. of episodes: 728

Production
- Producer: Kong Hyosoon
- Camera setup: Multiple
- Running time: 90 minutes
- Production company: Dong A Network

Original release
- Network: Channel A
- Release: December 4, 2011 – present

Now On My Way to Meet You (Korean: 이제 만나러 갑니다; RR: Ije mannareo gamnida) is a South Korean variety show which has aired on Channel A since December 4, 2011. It is part talk show, part talent show, and part beauty pageant.

The show is broadcast on Sunday nights at 11:00 PM over cable television, and is shot in Goyang, a satellite city northwest of Seoul.

== Format ==
When the show first aired, it was intended to be reuniting defectors with their estranged relatives. Episodes were shot at people's homes or in restaurants. The show never facilitated such reunions, and quickly changed format to a variety show shot in a "glitzy game-show-type set".

The guests are generally young female North Korean defectors (dubbed by the producers as "defector beauties") who discuss their experiences in both North and South Korea. They discuss topics including the North Korean lifestyle, products, and food. The guests are questioned by four male panelists, and perform comedy sketches, songs, and dance.

As of 2019, about 400 North Korean defectors have appeared on the show. The most famous defector participant has been activist Yeonmi Park.

== Reception and coverage ==
The show has been credited by the North Korean defector guests with changing the perception that South Koreans have of North Korean defectors and taking the stigma out of being a North Korean defector, but also criticized by defectors for exaggerating or falsifying negative aspects of life in the North to gain viewers.

In April 2017, Unreported World produced a documentary about the show, hosted by Seyi Rhodes.

== See also ==
- North Korean defectors
