= To Sell a War =

- Directed by: Neil Docherty
- Produced by: Neil Docherty
- Narrated by: Linden MacIntyre
- Edited by: Les Onody
- Release date: December 1992
- Country: Canada
- Language: English

To Sell a War is a documentary film, first aired in December 1992 as part of CBC programme The Fifth Estate. The programme was directed and produced by Neil Docherty.

It chronicles the Citizens for a Free Kuwait campaign efforts to spin public relations sentiment in the United States in favor of the Gulf War, focusing on the story of Nurse Nayirah, who was, in fact, Nayirah al-Sabah, the daughter of Kuwait's ambassador to the United States Saud Nasir Al-Sabah. Her infamous testimony about Iraqi soldiers removing babies from incubators, which was widely disseminated, was a result of coaching by PR firm Hill & Knowlton.

== Awards ==
- 1993 – American Film and Video Festival - Blue Ribbon
- 1993 – Canadian Association of Journalists Awards for Investigative Reporting - CAJ Award - Network Television Category
- 1993 – The New York Festivals - Bronze Medal
- 1992 – Columbus International Film and Video Festival - Chris Award
- 1992 – Columbus International Film and Video Festival - Bronze Plaque
- 1992 – International Emmy Awards - International Emmy Award Documentary
- 1992 – Yorkton Short Film/Video Festival - Golden Sheaf Award - Best Documentary

== See also ==
- Atrocity propaganda
