= Nayirah testimony =

False testimony about Iraq's invasion of Kuwait

15-year-old Nayirah al-Ṣabaḥ giving her testimony to the United States Congressional Human Rights Caucus on October 10, 1990, two months after the Iraqi invasion of Kuwait. It was later revealed that she was the daughter of Kuwaiti ambassador Saud Nasser al-Saud al-Sabah and that her testimony was false.

The Nayirah testimony was false testimony given before the United States Congressional Human Rights Caucus on October 10, 1990, by a 15-year-old Kuwaiti girl who was publicly identified only as Nayirah at the time, and presented herself as having been a volunteer nurse at a Kuwaiti hospital at the time of the Iraqi invasion of Kuwait. In her testimony, which took place two months after the invasion, she claimed to have witnessed Iraqi soldiers taking premature babies out of incubators in a maternity ward before looting the incubators and leaving the babies to die on the floor. Nayirah's statements were widely publicized and cited numerous times in the United States Senate and by American president George H. W. Bush to contribute to the rationale for pursuing military action against Iraq. Her portrayal of Iraqi war crimes was aimed at further increasing global support for Kuwait against the Iraqi occupation during the Gulf War, which resulted in the expulsion of Iraqi troops from Kuwait by a 42-country coalition led by the United States.

In January 1992, it was revealed that Nayirah had never been a nurse and that she was the daughter of Saud Nasser Al-Saud Al-Sabah, the Kuwaiti ambassador to the United States at the time the testimony was made. She and her father were members of the House of Sabah, the ruling family of Kuwait. Furthermore, it was revealed that her testimony was organized as part of a wider public relations campaign conducted by the Kuwaiti government-in-exile's Citizens for a Free Kuwait, which sought to encourage American military involvement against Iraq's occupation of Kuwait through coordination with the American public relations firm Hill & Knowlton. In the aftermath of the Gulf War, the Nayirah testimony came to be regarded as a classic example of modern atrocity propaganda.

Nayirah's story was initially corroborated by Amnesty International, which published a report about the supposed killings and testimony from Kuwaiti evacuees. Following the liberation of Kuwait, international media crews were given access to the country. A report by ABC News found that "patients, including premature babies, did die, when many of Kuwait's nurses and doctors ... fled" but Iraqi troops "almost certainly had not stolen hospital incubators and left hundreds of Kuwaiti babies to die." Later, Amnesty International USA reacted by issuing a correction, with executive director John Healey subsequently accusing the George H. W. Bush administration of "opportunistic manipulation of the international human rights movement."

== Background ==
=== Looting by Iraqi forces ===
Following the Iraqi invasion and occupation of Kuwait, there were reports of widespread looting. On September 2, 1990, in a letter to the UN Secretary-General Javier Pérez de Cuéllar, Kuwait's UN representative, Mohammad A. Abulhasan, wrote:

Further to those of our communications which are intended to inform you of the actions perpetrated by the Iraqi occupation authorities in Kuwait in contravention of all international laws, and on the basis of confirmed information provided to us by the Government of Kuwait, we wish to draw attention to a phenomenon which has no precedent in history, namely, the Iraqi occupation authorities' organized operation for the purpose of looting and plundering Kuwait.

It is impossible to compare this operation to any similar incidents or to provide an exact account thereof because it is in effect an operation designed to achieve nothing less than the complete removal of Kuwait's assets, including property belonging to the State, to public and private institutions and to individuals, as well as the contents of houses, factories, stores, hospitals, academic institutes, schools, and universities ... What has occurred in Kuwait is the perpetration of an act of armed robbery by a State which has used its military, security and technical organs for that purpose.

In the letter, Abulhasan also noted the "theft of all equipment from private and public hospitals, including X-ray machines, scanners and pieces of laboratory equipment." The allegations of looting were also retold by evacuees who described "soldiers looting office buildings, schools and hospitals for air conditioners, computers, blackboards, desks, and even infant incubators and radiation equipment." Douglas Hurd, the British Secretary for foreign affairs surmised that "they are looting and destroying in a way which suggests that they may not expect to be there for very long."

Iraqis are beating people, bombing and shooting. They are taking all hospital equipment, babies out of incubators. Life-support systems are turned off. ... They are even removing traffic lights. The Iraqis are beating Kuwaitis, torturing them, knifing them, beating them, cutting their ears off if they are caught resisting or are with the Kuwaiti army or police.

— Evacuee's eyewitness account, as reported in the St. Louis Post-Dispatch on September 8, 1990

=== Incubator allegations ===
The looting of neonatal incubators attracted media attention because of allegations that premature babies were being discarded and dying as a result. On September 5, Abdul Wahab Al-Fowzan, the Kuwaiti health minister-in-exile, stated at a press conference in Taif, Saudi Arabia "that Iraqi soldiers had seized virtually all of the country's hospitals and medical institutions after their invasion" and that "soldiers evicted patients and systematically looted the hospitals of high-tech equipment, ambulances, drugs and plasma" which resulted in the death of 22 premature babies.

On September 5, in another letter to the UN Secretary General, Abulhasan reiterated Fowzan's claims writing:

We are informed by impeccable sources in Kuwait's health institutions that the Iraqi occupation authorities have carried out the following brutal crimes, which may be described as crimes against humanity: ... 2. The incubators in maternity hospitals used for children suffering from retarded growth (premature children) have been removed, causing the death of all the children who were under treatment.

The letter did not state how many babies had died. The allegations in the letter received widespread media coverage in the following days. That day, in an interview with released hostages on NPR's All Things Considered, a hostage stated that Iraqi troops were "hitting children with the butts of the guns, taking infants out of incubators and taking the incubators." Reuters also reported they had been told "that Iraqi troops took premature babies out of incubators in Kuwait in order to steal the equipment."

On September 9, NPR reported that "in a ward for premature infants, soldiers had turned off the oxygen on incubators and packed the equipment for shipment to Iraq."

The Washington Post described the origin of the Kuwaiti baby story in a September 10 article headlined "Iraq, Kuwait Waging an Old-Fashioned War of Propaganda", noting that it was unable to verify the accusations as Iraq did not permit access to the area and had quarantined diplomats:

The Kuwaiti baby story originated with a letter from a senior Kuwaiti public health official that was smuggled out of the country by a European diplomat late last month, according to Hudah Bahar, an architect who received the letter here in London. It was supplemented by information gathered from fleeing Kuwaitis and other sources by Fawzia Sayegh, a Kuwaiti pediatrician living here.

The letter claimed that Iraqi soldiers ordered patients evicted from several hospitals and closed down critical units for treating cancer patients, dialysis patients and those suffering from diabetes. Bahar and Sayegh said the Iraqis hauled sophisticated equipment such as dialysis machines back to Baghdad, part of the haul of cash, gold, cars and jewelry that is said by Arab banking sources to exceed $2 billion. Among the equipment taken were the 22 infant incubator units, they said.

On September 17, Edward Gnehm Jr., the U.S. ambassador-designate to Kuwait, told reporters that Kuwaiti health officials told him 22 babies had died when Iraqi troops had stolen their incubators. The Los Angeles Times reported that "refugees reported that incubators for premature babies were confiscated by Iraqi troops and the babies inside were piled on the floor and left to die." The San Jose Mercury News also reported the same allegation that day, adding that Western diplomats thought "this is the kind of thing that some people call genocide, and if people wanted to construe it as such, it could be cause for some kind of military intervention."

On September 25, The Washington Post reported that "Kuwait City's hospitals are being stripped of incubators." The president of Citizens for a Free Kuwait wrote to Representative Gus Yatron stating of how he "recently learned that the Iraqi leader has ordered that maternity hospital incubators [in Kuwait], used for treating premature babies, be turned off, allowing these infants to die of exposure."

On September 28, Kuwait's planning minister, Sulaiman Mutawa, reported that 12 babies had died as a result of incubator looting.

On September 30, U.S. News & World Report reported that it had obtained secret US government cables based on eyewitness accounts that revealed "shocking acts of brutality inflicted by the Iraqis against innocent citizens at Kuwaiti hospitals." The cables stated that on the sixth day of Iraqi invasion, Iraqi soldiers "entered the Adan Hospital in Fahaheel looking for hospital equipment to steal" and that "they unplugged the oxygen to the incubators supporting 22 premature babies and made off with the incubators", thus killing the 22 children.

=== George H. W. Bush remarks ===
President George H. W. Bush

On September 29, in a meeting between the Emir of Kuwait Sheik Jabbar al Ahmed al Sabah and President George H. W. Bush, the exiled emir told the president that Iraqis were "going into hospitals, taking babies out of incubators and people off life-support machines to send the equipment back to Iraq." In his remarks following the discussion, Bush stated:

"Iraqi aggression has ransacked and pillaged a once peaceful and secure country, its population assaulted, incarcerated, intimidated, and even murdered" and that "Iraq's leaders are trying to wipe an internationally recognized sovereign state, a member of the Arab League and the United Nations, off the face of the map."

On October 9, during a Presidential news conference, Bush stated:

"I thought General Scowcroft [Assistant to the President for National Security Affairs] put it very well after the Amir left here. And I am very much concerned, not just about the physical dismantling but of the brutality that has now been written on by Amnesty International confirming some of the tales told us by the Amir of brutality. It's just unbelievable, some of the things at least he reflected. I mean, people on a dialysis machine cut off, the machine sent to Baghdad; babies in incubators heaved out of the incubators and the incubators themselves sent to Baghdad. Now, I don't know how many of these tales can be authenticated, but I do know that when the Amir was here he was speaking from the heart. And after that came Amnesty International, who were debriefing many of the people at the border. And it's sickening."

=== Citizens for a Free Kuwait ===
The Citizens for a Free Kuwait was a public relations committee set up by the Kuwaiti embassy, described by The Times News as a "Washington, D.C.- based committee comprised of concerned Kuwaitis and Americans". Though the committee occupied embassy office space, they were to be working independently of the embassy.

=== Hill & Knowlton ===
In 1990, after being approached by a Kuwaiti expatriate in New York, Hill & Knowlton took on "Citizens for a Free Kuwait." The objective of the national campaign was to raise awareness in the United States about the dangers posed by Iraqi dictator Saddam Hussein to Kuwait.

Hill & Knowlton conducted a $1 million study to determine the best way to win support for strong action. H & K had the Wirthington Group conduct focus groups to determine the best strategy that would influence public opinion. The study found that an emphasis on atrocities, particularly the incubator story, was the most effective.

Hill & Knowlton is estimated to have been given as much as $12 million by the Kuwaitis for their public relations campaign.

=== Congressional Human Rights Foundation ===
The Congressional Human Rights Foundation is a non-governmental organization that investigates human rights abuse. It was headed by Democratic U.S. Representative Tom Lantos and Republican Representative John Porter and rented space in Hill & Knowlton's Washington headquarters at a $3000 reduced rate.

=== U.S. government involvement ===
Some scholars claim the U.S. government and the White House knew nothing; others claim that the U.S. knew and was complicit. German historian Andreas Elter stated:

The work of the US advertising agency for the Kuwaiti carried the signature of the White House in a certain way. President Bush was briefed by Fuller on every single step. Whether he also gave his personal consent for the baby story, however, cannot be proven. What remains, however, is that close personal contacts existed between the US government and an agency that had demonstrably given birth to lies. The same agency was even directly employed by the US government in another context.

== Testimony ==
On October 10, 1990, Nayirah was the last to testify at the Caucus. In her oral testimony, which lasted 4 minutes, she stated:

Mr. Chairman, and members of the committee, my name is Nayirah and I just came out of Kuwait. My mother and I were in Kuwait on August 2nd for a peaceful summer holiday. My older sister had a baby on July 29th and we wanted to spend some time in Kuwait with her.

I only pray that none of my 10th grade classmates had a summer vacation like I did. I may have wished sometimes that I can be an adult, that I could grow up quickly. What I saw happening to the children of Kuwait and to my country has changed my life forever, has changed the life of all Kuwaitis, young and old, mere children or more.

My sister with my five-day-old nephew traveled across the desert to safety. There is no milk available for the baby in Kuwait. They barely escaped when their car was stuck in the desert sand and help came from Saudi Arabia.

I stayed behind and wanted to do something for my country. The second week after invasion, I volunteered at the Al-Adan Hospital with 12 other women who wanted to help as well. I was the youngest volunteer. The other women were from 20 to 30 years old.

While I was there, I saw the Iraqi soldiers come into the hospital with guns. They took the babies out of the incubators, took the incubators and left the children to die on the cold floor. It was horrifying. I could not help but think of my nephew who was born premature and might have died that day as well. After I left the hospital, some of my friends and I distributed flyers condemning the Iraqi invasion until we were warned we might be killed if the Iraqis saw us.

The Iraqis have destroyed everything in Kuwait. They stripped the supermarkets of food, the pharmacies of medicine, the factories of medical supplies, ransacked their houses and tortured neighbors and friends.

I saw and talked to a friend of mine after his torture and release by the Iraqis. He is 22 but he looked as though he could have been an old man. The Iraqis dunked his head into a swimming pool until he almost drowned. They pulled out his fingernails and then played electric shocks to sensitive, private parts of his body. He was lucky to survive.

If an Iraqi soldier is found dead in the neighborhood, they burn to the ground all the houses in the general vicinity and would not let firefighters come until the only ash and rubble was left.

The Iraqis were making fun of President Bush and verbally and physically abusing my family and me on our way out of Kuwait. We only did so because life in Kuwait became unbearable. They have forced us to hide, burn or destroy everything identifying our country and our government.

I want to emphasize that Kuwait is our mother and the Emir our father. We repeated this on the roofs of our houses in Kuwait until the Iraqis began shooting at us, and we shall repeat it again. I am glad I am 15, old enough to remember Kuwait before Saddam Hussein destroyed it and young enough to rebuild it.

Thank you.

Although Nayirah did not specify how many babies were in the incubators in her oral testimony, in the written testimony distributed by Hill and Knowlton, it read "While I was there I saw the Iraqi soldiers come into the hospital with guns, and go into the room where 15 babies were in incubators." The testimony was not given under oath.

Representative John Porter, co-chairman of the caucus, remarked that in his eight years of service on the caucus, he had never heard such "brutality and inhumanity and sadism." Nayirah's testimony was described as the most dramatic.

=== Hill & Knowlton ===
It is unclear how much of Nayirah's testimony was coached. Though the firm was supposed to provide only stylistic help, it was reported that H&K "provided witnesses, wrote testimony, and coached the witnesses for effectiveness."

== Reactions ==
Nayirah's testimony was widely publicized. Hill & Knowlton, which had filmed the hearing, sent out a video news release to MediaLink, a firm which served about 700 television stations in the United States.

That night, portions of the testimony aired on ABC's Nightline and NBC Nightly News reaching an estimated audience between 35 and 53 million Americans. Seven senators cited Nayirah's testimony in their speeches backing the use of force. (Note: This was viewed as important since the January 10, 1991 authorization to use force passed by only 5 senate votes.) President George Bush repeated the story at least ten times in the following weeks. Her testimony helped to stir American opinion in favor of participation in the Gulf War.

=== Initial response ===
On January 13, 1991, the Sunday Times reported that a Dr. Ali Al-Huwail could vouch for 92 deaths.

Iraq denied the allegations. On October 16, Iraqi information minister Latif Nassif al-Jassem told the Iraqi News Agency that "now you [Bush] are using what he [Sheikh Jaber] told you to make Congress ratify the budget which is in the red because of your policies" adding that "you, as the president of a superpower, have to weigh words carefully and not act as a clown who repeats what he is told."

In a visit to Kuwait on October 21, 1990, by journalists who were escorted by Iraqi information ministry officials, doctors at a Kuwaiti maternity facility denied the incubator allegations. In the visit, the Iraqi head of the Kuwaiti health department, Abdul-Rahman Mohammad al-Ugeily, said that "Baghdad had sent 1,000 doctors and other medical to staff to help run Kuwait's 14 hospitals and health centres following the invasion."

=== Martin and MacArthur ===
A little reportorial investigation would have done a great service to the democratic process.

— John MacArthur

On March 15, 1991, John Martin, an ABC reporter, reported that "patients, including premature babies, did die, when many of Kuwait's nurses and doctors stopped working or fled the country" and discovered that Iraqi troops "almost certainly had not stolen hospital incubators and left hundreds of Kuwaiti babies to die."

On January 6, 1992, The New York Times published an op-ed piece by John MacArthur entitled "Remember Nayirah, Witness for Kuwait?" MacArthur had discovered that Nayirah was the daughter of the Kuwaiti Ambassador to the U.S., Saud Nasir al-Sabah. MacArthur noted that "the incubator story seriously distorted the American debate about whether to support military action" and questioned whether "their [Representatives Lantos and Porter] special relationship with Hill and Knowlton should prompt a Congressional investigation to find out if their actions merely constituted an obvious conflict of interest or, worse, if they knew who the tearful Nayirah really was in October 1990." The story earned MacArthur the Monthly Journalism Award from The Washington Monthly in April 1992, and the Mencken Award in 1993.

=== Hill & Knowlton ===
We disseminated information in a void as a basis for Americans to form opinions.

— Frank Mankiewicz, Vice Chairman, Hill & Knowlton

On January 15, 1992, the CEO of Hill & Knowlton, Thomas E. Eidson, responded to the concerns raised by MacArthur in a letter to the editor to The New York Times. Eidson stated that "at no time has this firm collaborated with anyone to produce knowingly deceptive testimony", asserting that the firm "had no reason to question her veracity when she testified following her escape from Kuwait." The letter explained that Nayirah's charge that Iraqi soldiers removed newborn babies from incubators was corroborated by Dr. Ibraheem Behbehani, head of the Red Crescent, before the United Nations Security Council, and that the media was not permitted back inside Kuwait "until after the liberation", so there was no way to verify the stories of refugees like her. Eidson concluded that "Nayirah's credibility should no more be questioned than if she had been a doctor or teacher" and the company's work with the Kuwaitis was consistent with firm's standards stating that "the public interest was fairly served."

In August 1992, Howard Paster replaced Robert K. Gray as the general manager of the Washington office in order to clean up the firm's image.

Critics contended that Hill & Knowlton had concocted a fake popular movement, Citizens for a Free Kuwait, and subsequently used questionable evidence and suspect witnesses to influence public opinion and policy in the United States and the UN.

Hill & Knowlton's actions taken on behalf of Citizens for a Free Kuwait, together with those of other major clients including Bank of Credit and Commerce International, the Church of Scientology, and an anti-abortion campaign by Catholic bishops raised ethical concerns among public relations professionals. The concerns, though not new, were more vigorous than previous ones due to the prominence of the issues.

=== Tom Lantos ===
Hold on to your hats. The grand campaign to rewrite the history of the Persian Gulf war is on.

— Tom Lantos' response to MacArthur

While Lantos was a close friend of Bush at the time, as well as a co-chair of the Congressional Human Rights Foundation, he failed to notify Bush of his position within the Nayirah case, or of her true identity. In an interview, Lantos stated that he had concealed Nayirah's identity at the request of her father in order to protect her family and friends. Lantos denied any allegations of wrongdoing arguing that "The media happened to focus on her. If she hadn't testified, they would have focused on something else." Lantos also stated that:

The notion that any of the witnesses brought to the caucus through the Kuwaiti Embassy would not be credible did not cross my mind. I have no basis for assuming that her story is not true, but the point goes beyond that. If one hypothesizes that the woman's story is fictitious from A to Z, that in no way diminishes the avalanche of human rights violations.

In a letter to the editor to The New York Times on January 27, 1992, entitled "Kuwaiti Gave Consistent Account of Atrocities", Tom Lantos responded to MacArthur's allegations. He wrote that "Mr. MacArthur's deceptive article serves only the cynics who seek to rewrite the history of the Persian Gulf war" noting "the article's sinister innuendo suggests that the girl was not even in Kuwait at the time of the Iraqi invasion, and that the whole gruesome incident was a diabolical plot by an American public relations firm." Lantos wrote that "the fact that Nayirah was the daughter of the Ambassador of Kuwait made her a more credible witness" and that "her relationship to the Ambassador and Government enhanced her credibility." He also noted that "her account was consistent with the information we received from other witnesses, with hundreds of other atrocity stories from Kuwait carried by media around the globe, and consistent with reports by independent human rights organizations, such as Amnesty International, who also testified at our hearing and subsequently published accounts similar to Nayirah's." Lantos concluded that "given the countless cases of verified Iraqi human rights violations", it was "unnecessary and counterproductive to invent atrocities."

Lantos also rejected the allegations of a special relationship between the caucus and Hill & Knowlton, stating that "caucus activities are held without regard to whether these countries are represented by any law firm or public relations firm."

In a subsequent letter to The New York Times, MacArthur pointed out that the testimony had been retracted.

=== Ambassador Sabah ===
The ambassador has stated that his daughter had witnessed the atrocities she described and that her presence in Kuwait could be verified by the United States Embassy in Kuwait. He also stated "If I wanted to lie, or if we wanted to lie, if we wanted to exaggerate, I wouldn't use my daughter to do so. I could easily buy other people to do it."

=== Lauri Fitz-Pegado ===
Lauri Fitz-Pegado was the acting Vice President of Hill & Knowlton at the time of Nayirah's Testimony. It was later confirmed within the Kuwaitis investigation that Fitz-Pegado was responsible for coaching Nayirah in what was proven to be her false testimony.

=== Other ===
The campaign has been described by critics as corrupt, deceptive and unethical. Some charge that it was used to spread false or exaggerated tales of Iraqi atrocities.

Lantos was criticized for his withholding the information.

== Investigations ==
=== Human Rights Watch ===
In 1992, the human rights organization Middle East Watch, a division of Human Rights Watch, published the results of their investigation of the incubator story. Its director, Andrew Whitley, told the press, "While it is true that the Iraqis targeted hospitals, there is no truth to the charge which was central to the war propaganda effort that they stole incubators and callously removed babies allowing them to die on the floor. The stories were manufactured from germs of truth by people outside the country who should have known better." One investigator, Aziz Abu-Hamad, interviewed doctors in the hospital where Nayirah claimed she witnessed Iraqi soldiers pull 15 infants from incubators and leave them to die. The Independent reported, "The doctors told him the maternity ward had 25 to 30 incubators. None was taken by the Iraqis, and no babies were taken from them."

=== Amnesty International ===
Amnesty International initially supported the story, but later issued a retraction. It stated that it "found no reliable evidence that Iraqi forces had caused the deaths of babies by removing them or ordering their removal from incubators."

=== Kroll Report ===
Kuwaiti officials do not discuss the matter with the press. In order to respond to these charges, the Kuwaiti government hired Kroll Associates to undertake an independent investigation of the incubator story. The Kroll investigation lasted nine weeks and conducted over 250 interviews. The interviews with Nayirah revealed that her original testimony was wildly distorted at best; she told Kroll that she had actually seen only one baby outside its incubator for "no more than a moment." She also told Kroll that she was never a volunteer at the hospital and had in fact "only stopped by for a few minutes."

== Aftermath ==
In fact, nearly everyone involved in peddling the tale of the unplugged babies, from Amnesty International to Kuwaiti doctors, has sprinted away from it.

— Newsday

Following the end of the war, Reuters reported that Iraq returned "98 truckloads of medical equipment stolen from Kuwait, including two of the baby incubators". Abdul Rahim al-Zeid, an assistant under-secretary at the Kuwaiti Public Health Ministry, said that by returning the incubators the Iraqis had unwittingly provided proof that they took them. Kuwait's chief ambulance officer, Abdul Reda Abbas, stated that "We think the Iraqis might have returned the incubators by mistake."

Following the revelation of Nayirah's identity, there was public outrage that this information had been withheld.

== Scholarly commentary ==
In the end, the question was not whether H&K effectively altered public opinion, but whether the combined efforts of America's own government, foreign interests, and private PR and lobbying campaigns drowned out decent and rational, unemotional debate.

— The Power House: Robert Keith Gray and the Selling of Access and Influence in Washington

The content, presentation, distribution, effectiveness, and purpose of Nayirah's testimony have been the subject of multiple public relations studies.

In his book Strategic Maneuvering in Argumentative Discourse, Frans H. van Eemeren, when discussing argumentum ad misericordiam, described Nayirah's story as a "clearly fallacious appeal to pity". In the paper The Hill & Knowlton Cases: A Brief on the Controversy by Susanne A. Roschwalb, the author noted that as H&K was a British firm, "what effect did British concerns—such as the possible collapse of its financial institutions, if the Kuwaiti currency, the dinar, became worthless—have on Hill & Knowlton's efforts?" Ted Rowse, in his article "Kuwaitgate — killing of Kuwaiti babies by Iraqi soldiers exaggerated" in The Washington Monthly, noted that "Most reporters, having apparently been burned by Hill & Knowlton's handiwork in spreading the original Nayirah story without checking it out, seem to prefer to let the story fade away, passively falling, once again, for the company's public relations guile." John R. MacArthur, who authored Second Front: Censorship and Propaganda in the Gulf War, has noted that "at the time, it was the most sophisticated and expensive PR campaign ever run in the U.S. by a foreign government."

In A. B. Abrams' book Atrocity Fabrication and Its Consequences, Nayirah's testimony was seen as part of a continuing trend of using fabricated atrocities to influence public opinion, and to justify foreign policy and its consequences. Abrams noted that discredited fabricated atrocities continued to negatively impact the reputation of targeted countries.

== See also ==
- Foreign interventions by the United States
- American imperialism
- House of Al-Sabah
- To Sell a War
- Wag the Dog
- Gulf of Tonkin incident
- Live from Baghdad
- Jumana Hanna
- Saddam Hussein's alleged shredder
- Hamas baby beheading hoax
- Atrocity propaganda
- Colin Powell's presentation to the United Nations Security Council
- Iraq and weapons of mass destruction
- The Perfect Story
