= Saud Nasser Al-Saud Al-Sabah =

Kuwaiti politician (1944–2012)

Saud Al-Nasir Al-Sabah
- سعود الناصر الصباح

Minister of Oil
- In office March 1998 – 2000

Minister of Information
- In office 1992 – March 1998

Ambassador of Kuwait to the United States
- In office 1981–1992
- Preceded by: Jamil Al-Hassani
- Succeeded by: Mohammad Sabah Al-Salem Al-Sabah

Personal details
- Born: October 3, 1944
- Died: 21 January 2012 (aged 67)

Saud Nasser Al-Saud Al-Sabah (3 October 1944 – 21 January 2012) was a Kuwaiti politician, diplomat, and ruling family member.

== Biography ==
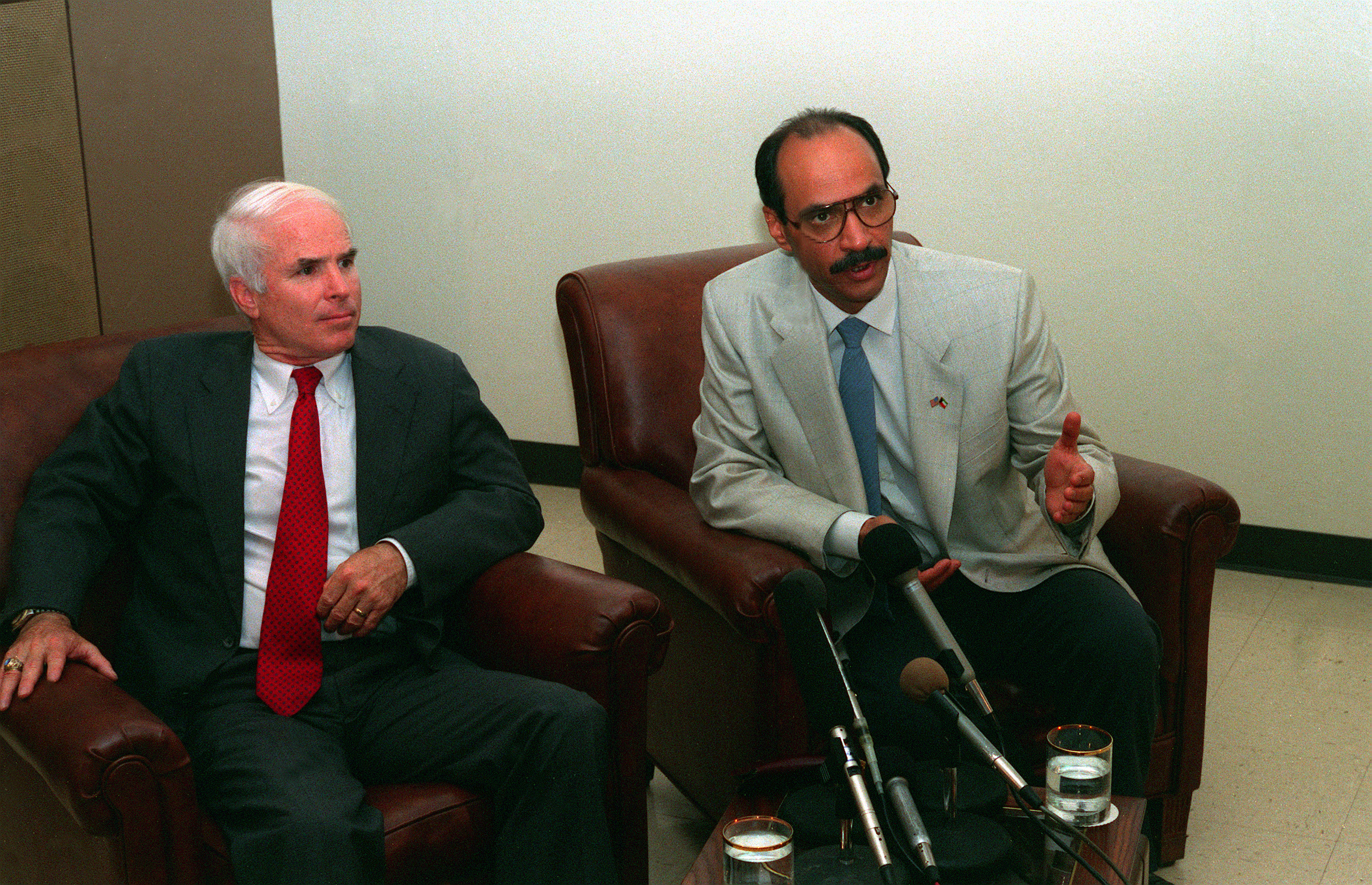
Sabah with John McCain in 1991

Sabah served as ambassador of Kuwait to the United Kingdom from 1975 to 1981. He then served as Kuwaiti ambassador to the United States during the First Gulf War, more specifically from 1981 to 1992. In 1992, he was appointed information minister and served in the post until March 1998. He was oil minister from March 1998 to 2000. He resigned from the post due to an explosion that killed five workers at the country's largest oil refinery.

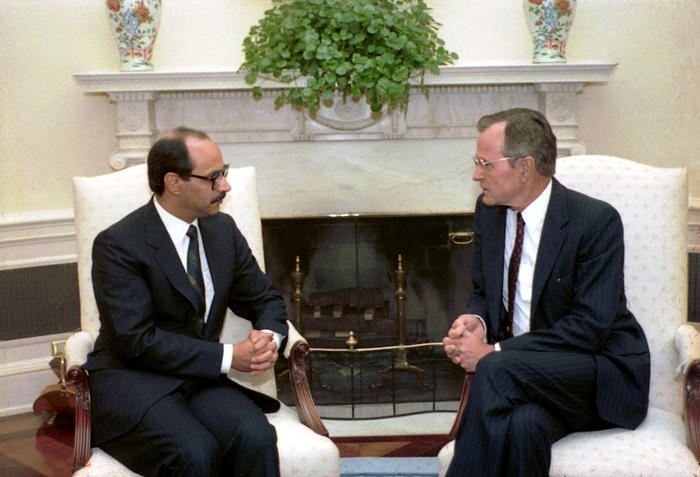
Sabah with George H. W. Bush in 1990

He forced a false testimony from his then 15-year-old daughter Nayirah and was involved with Citizens for a Free Kuwait, a front group established by the Kuwaiti government to promote US involvement in the Gulf War. This involvement was covered in the 1992 documentary film To Sell a War.

Sabah died of cancer on 21 January 2012.

== See also ==
- Military of Kuwait
- Nayirah testimony
