= Jumana Hanna =

Iraqi woman of Assyrian background

- جُمانة حنّا
- Photo of Jumana from the 2003 Washington Post story about her
- Born: Jumana Mikhail Hanna; 1962 (age 63–64); Karrada, Baghdad, Iraq
- Known for: False story of imprisonment in the Washington Post

Jumana Mikhail Hanna (Arabic: جُمانة ميخائيل حنّا; born c. 1962), also spelled Jumana Michael Hanna, is an Iraqi-Assyrian woman who was imprisoned at the facility known as Al Kelab Al Sayba, or Loose Dogs, during the rule of Saddam Hussein. She is most well known for providing a false account about her imprisonment in Iraq, which was featured on the front page of the Washington Post.

== Background ==
Hanna was born in 1962 to an Assyrian Christian family in Iraq. Her mother had been the daughter of an iron merchant, and her father had been a pharmacist. The family lived in the Karrada neighborhood of Baghdad, and Hanna was the only child.

== Washington Post story ==
Hanna would become a well-known figure after the publishing of an article in the Washington Post in 2003. That year, Hanna had revisited the Al Kelab Al Sayba (Arabic: الكلاب الصيبة) prison where she had been incarcerated, telling reporters that she had been jailed and tortured in the facility, and that her husband had been killed in a nearby prison. She had returned to the prison to identify the members of the Iraqi police force whom she said tortured her and others during her arrest, as well as to tell the story of her arrest to the Washington Post.

In the article, Hanna described many aspects of her arrest. The article stated that Hanna was victim to many violations such as being hung from a rod and beaten with a stick, raped near a dead tree trunk, and having electric shock applied to her vagina. Hanna had testified about her experiences to the Coalition Provisional Authority that she had been tortured during her time in the prison, due to her religious beliefs. The evidence she provided eventually led to nine Iraqi officers being arrested.

Hanna had stated that her arrest began after her marriage to a man named Haitam Jamil Anwar, whom she had met in the summer of 1993. Anwar was a 30-year old Indian wood carver who was born to British Raj-era immigrants, and first encountered Hanna after she had come in to his shop asking him to repair a box. Although they had to keep their relationship secret, they had been able to marry by that August, breaking Ba'athist law requiring permission for Iraqi citizens to marry foreigners. Hanna's arrest began in November of that year, after a visit to the National Olympic Committee of Iraq, where she was supposed to meet Uday Hussein.

Immediately after the story of Hanna's arrest broke out, authorities relocated Hanna, her mother, and two children to the As-Salam Palace. They stayed in a room near the office of Paul Bremer and lived in the palace for three months, before relocating to northern California in the western United States.

== Investigations ==
Following Hanna's relocation to the United States, her case was given top priority by Bernard Kerik, the former interior minister for the Coalition Provisional Authority, and Paul Bremer requested humanitarian parole for her. Kerik had two military investigators on the scene, and he also went to go see the prison for himself, saying “To be physically there, to look at the barbed wire that was hooked into the trees, to think about the stories she told and then actually see the devices they used...It was sickening.”

The Washington Post story was later mentioned by Paul Wolfowitz while testifying before the United States Senate Committee on Foreign Relations. Wolfowitz would redescribe the details of the story while stating that her courage to retell her story would lead to a sense of justice for many Iraqis who faced similar hardships under Saddam Hussein.

=== Esquire article ===
Sara Solovitch, a journalist based in California, became interested in the story and met with Hanna for a series of interviews, as she intended to write a book about her life. She had met with Hanna in August 2004, and communicated with her through a translator and recording notes on a tape recorder. After their first meeting, however, Solovitch began to have doubts about Hanna's stories, primarily due to her insistence that she attended Oxford from 1982 to 1984 despite her poor English. Other notable findings also sowed doubt in Hanna's story;

- A respected gynecologist was contacted to confirm Hanna's story that she was raped and abused, but he could find no evidence of such having occurred and accused Hanna of all but lying
- An exhumation of the prison yard where Hanna had been incarcerated yielded bones, but forensic tests detailed that they were not human, but instead cow bones. This was in contrast to Hanna's statements, which claimed that 120 bodies had been unearthed.
- The police officers that were arrested were claimed to be low in ranking, but several of them were high-ranking officers

She would later feel that many of Hanna's stories were "ludicrous" and that hardly any details of her account were true. After a conversation with Hanna's mother, Sara witnessed Hanna fly into a fit of rage, and would go on to find other faults in her story. Her husband, who allegedly had been executed in an Iraqi prison, was in fact still alive; he was also not originally Indian as she had claimed, but an Iraqi Arab. Solovitch's research also revealed that a law preventing intermarriage in Ba'athist society never existed, and that the real reason Hanna had gone to prison was on charges of prostitution to prevent her marriage to her husband.

== Response ==
Following the publishing of the Esquire article, Hanna received negative attention for falsifying the story. Many details about Hanna, such as her spending habits and her work with charities, had also caused her to be alienated from many of the Iraqi emigres and other people in California she had met. She had moved to Chicago by the time the article had been published.

The Washington Post edited their story with a clarification after the Esquire article had been published, stating that Hanna's story of abuse couldn't be verified. However, then-editor David E. Hoffman stated "I would point out that she said one set of things to us and then she said another set of things to the author" of the Esquire article, Hoffman said. "If you look at those two sets of things, they didn't overlap much." Speculation over the charge of Hanna's arrest soon followed; Toma Kalabat, a cousin of Hanna, believed that she had been arrested for cheating people out of money on the promise of visas to Europe.

The revelation of Hanna's story also called into question the legitimacy of the US invasion of Iraq. Writing from Dubai, Youssef Ibrahim, former columnist for The Washington Post, believed that those in the Coalition Government were smart enough to know that Hanna's story hadn't been true, and that the controversy surrounding it negated Iraqis in the post-Saddam era to feeling manipulated and abused. White supremacist David Duke also commented publicly about the story, blaming the American government as Neocons who attempted to justify the invasion using Hanna's original story.

The nine Iraqi officers arrested on her testimony were released later when it became apparent that little of Ms. Hanna's tale could be verified.

== See also ==
- Nayirah testimony
- Atrocity propaganda
- Yeonmi Park
