= Yeonmi Park =

North Korean defector and activist (born 1993)

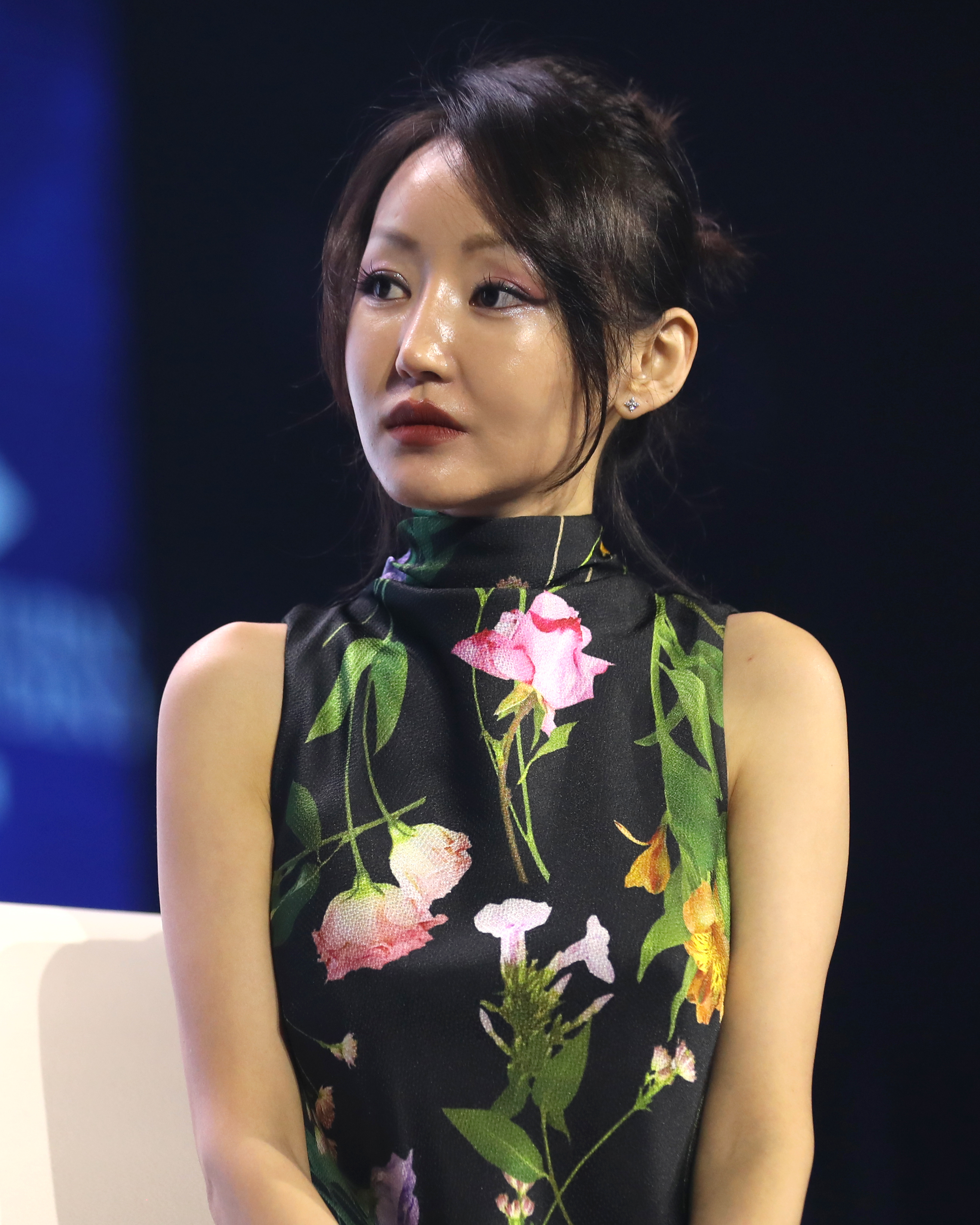
- Park in 2023
- Born: Park Yeon Mi; October 4, 1993 (age 33); Hyesan, Ryanggang Province, North Korea
- Citizenship: North Korea (until 2007); South Korea (formerly); United States (from 2021)
- Education: Columbia University (BA); Dongguk University
- Occupations: Conservative activist; author; speaker; YouTuber
- Years active: 2011–present
- Movement: Conservatism
- Spouse: Ezekiel Charlesworth (m. 2017; div. 2020)
- Children: 1
- Relatives: Eun-mi (sister)

YouTube information
- Channel: Voice of North Korea by Yeonmi Park
- Years active: 2017–present
- Subscribers: 1.16 million
- Views: 129 million

Korean name
- Hangul: 박연미
- Hanja: 朴研美
- RR: Bak Yeonmi
- MR: Pak Yŏnmi
- Last updated: April 3, 2026

Signature
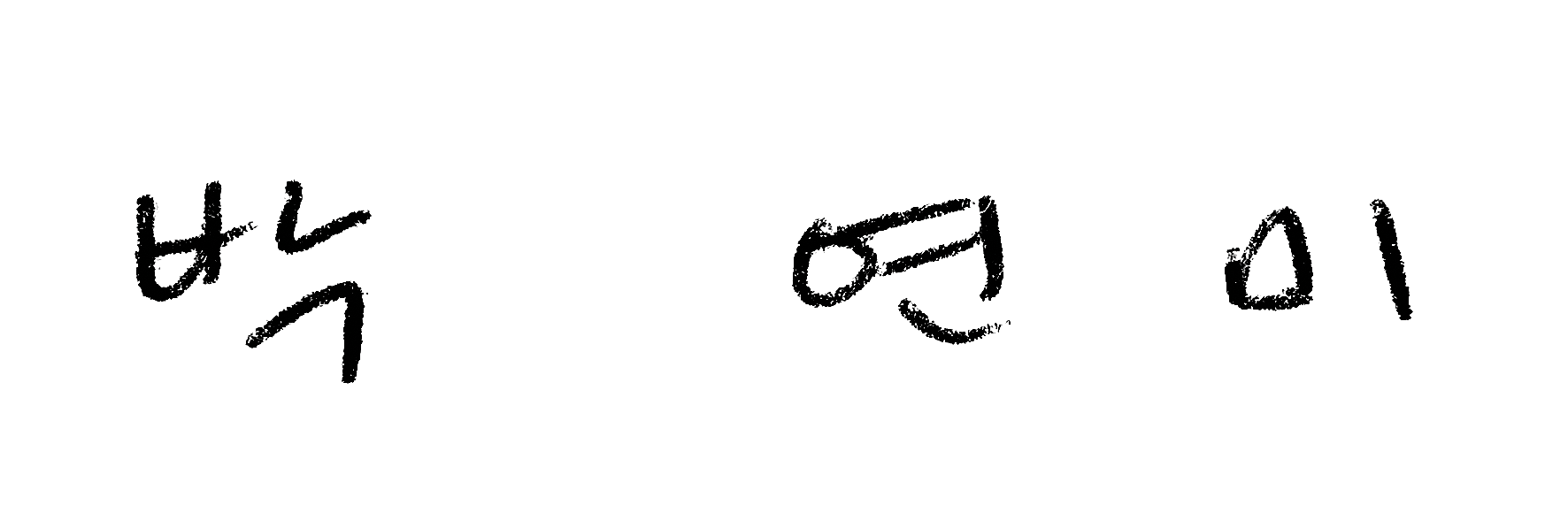

Yeonmi Park (Korean: 박연미; born October 4, 1993) is an American conservative activist and author. Born in North Korea, she defected from the country and was described by The Washington Post as "one of the most famous North Korean defectors in the world".

Born in Hyesan, Park fled from North Korea to China in 2007 at age 13 before moving to South Korea, then to the United States. She made her media debut in 2011 on the show Now On My Way to Meet You, where she was dubbed "Paris Hilton" due to her stories of her family's wealthy lifestyle. She came to wider global attention after her speech at the 2014 One Young World Summit in Dublin, Ireland. Park's memoir, In Order to Live: A North Korean Girl's Journey to Freedom, was published in 2015, and as of 2023 has sold over 100,000 copies. During the 2020s, she became a conservative political commentator in the American media through speeches, podcasts and the 2023 publication of her second book, While Time Remains: A North Korean Defector's Search for Freedom in America.

The authenticity of Park's claims about life in North Korea – many of which have contradicted her earlier stories and those of both her mother and fellow defectors from North Korea – have been the subject of widespread skepticism. Political commentators, journalists and professors of Korean studies have criticized Park's accounts of life in North Korea for inconsistencies, contradictory claims, and exaggerations. Other North Korean defectors, including those from the same city as Park, have expressed concern that the tendency for "celebrity defectors" to exaggerate about life in North Korea will produce skepticism about their stories. In 2014, The Diplomat published an investigation by journalist Mary Ann Jolley, who had previously worked with Park, documenting numerous inconsistencies in Park's memories and descriptions of life in Korea. In July 2023, a Washington Post investigation found there were some discrepancies to Park's claims about life in North Korea. Park attributed the discrepancies to her imperfect memory and language skills, and her autobiography's coauthor, Maryanne Vollers, said Park was the victim of a North Korean smear campaign.

Park runs the YouTube channel "Voice of North Korea by Yeonmi Park", which as of July 2023 has over one million subscribers. Her political views have been called "American conservative", and she has criticized political correctness and woke culture in the U.S., drawing parallels between political correctness in the U.S. and North Korea.

== Early life ==
=== North Korea (1993–2007) ===
Park was born on October 4, 1993, in Hyesan, Ryanggang Province, North Korea (Democratic People's Republic of Korea – DPRK); her father was Park Jin-sik and her mother was Byeon Keum-sook. Her older sister, Eun-mi, was born in 1991. Her childhood was during the 1990s North Korean famine. Park's father was a civil servant who worked at the Hyesan town hall as a member of the ruling Workers' Party of Korea and supplemented his income by smuggling goods from China.

Journalists have said that Park's memories and descriptions of her early life are often contradictory and at odds with her mother's, as well as with other defectors' descriptions of life in North Korea, and that her story has changed depending upon the audience.

In 2014, at a speech at the Oslo Freedom Forum, Park spoke about her life as a young teen watching the 1997 film Titanic. Park had previously believed that "dying for the regime"—the Kim family—"was the most honorable thing" one could do, citing the film's themes of romantic love and selflessness as a broadening in her thinking from sacrificial national loyalty to a more personal, sacrificial devotion.

=== Leaving North Korea for China (2007) ===
Park left North Korea in 2007, when she was 13. According to her account published in The Telegraph in 2014, after her father "bribe[d] his way out of jail", the family began to plan their escape to China, but Park's older sister Eunmi left for China early without notifying them. The family feared that they would be punished for Eunmi's escape, so Yeonmi and her mother left North Korea by traveling through China with the help of brokers who smuggle North Koreans into China. They escaped by crossing the border into Changbai Korean Autonomous County, Jilin, China, on March 30, 2007, after Park had to witness her mother undergoing sexual assault. She states: "I saw my mother raped. The rapist was a Chinese broker. I will never forget his face. ... I was only 13 years old."

Park and her mother found a Christian shelter headed by Chinese and South Korean missionaries in Qingdao. Due to the city's large ethnic Korean population, they were able to evade the attention of authorities. With the missionaries' help, they fled to South Korea through Mongolia.

=== Park's father and the family's defection ===
Park has given three separate and vastly different accounts of her father's and the family's defection from North Korea, claiming that her father chose to stay in North Korea because he believed his illness would slow them down, claiming that she defected alongside him and buried his corpse after he died from illness during their defection, and also claiming to have left him behind in North Korea having never told him the family planned to defect. According to the 2014 Telegraph account and an account published in 2015 by The Guardian, Park's father was sick and stayed behind in North Korea, thinking his illness would slow them down. Other statements by Park in the same time frame suggested that her father had joined them in crossing to China. After crossing the border, Park and her mother headed for Jilin. They unsuccessfully tried to find Park's sister, Eunmi, asking the traffickers about her whereabouts. Park and her mother assumed that Eunmi had died. Park's and her mother's accounts of her father's death differ. In an interview with Joe Rogan, Park claimed that she and her family left their father behind in North Korea without telling him they had left.

=== Claiming asylum in Mongolia ===
Park says that in February 2009, after spending two days at a Christian shelter in Qingdao, she and her mother traveled through the Gobi Desert to Mongolia to seek asylum from South Korean diplomats. Park claims that they reached the Mongolian border and that the General Authority for Border Protection guards stopped them and threatened to deport them back to China. Park recalls that at this point she and her mother pledged to kill themselves with their razors, adding: "I thought it was the end of my life. We were saying goodbye to one another." Their actions persuaded the guards to let them through, but Park says they were placed under arrest and kept in custody at a detention center at Ulaanbaatar, Mongolia's capital. Park later said in an interview with Jordan Peterson that she believed the guards were toying with them since Mongolia's official policy on North Korean refugees is to deport them to South Korea.

On April 1, 2009, Park and her mother were sent to Ulaanbaatar's Chinggis Khaan Airport to be flown to Seoul Incheon International Airport. She later told The Telegraph that she felt relieved when Mongolian customs officials waved her through. Many years later, the South Korean National Intelligence Service informed Park that her sister, Eunmi, had escaped to South Korea via China and Thailand. Park and her mother eventually reunited with Eunmi.

=== South Korea (2009–2014) ===
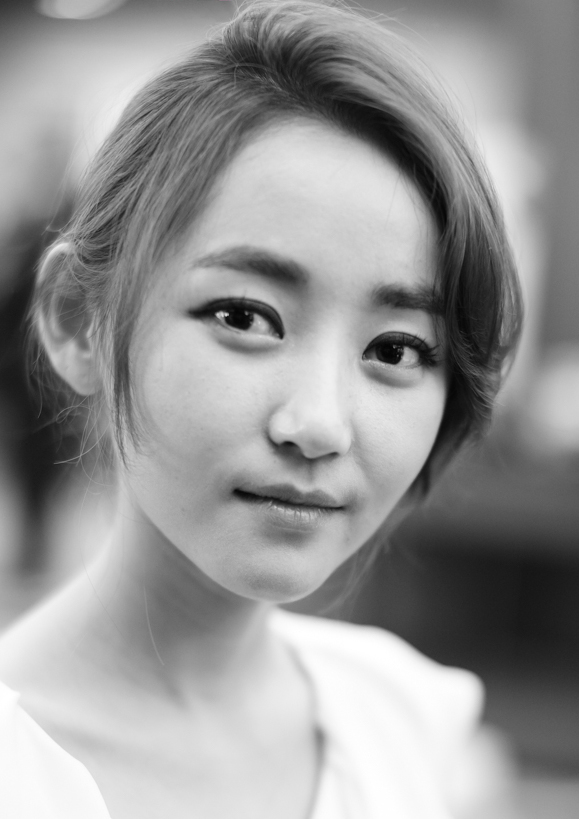
Park in 2014

Park was automatically granted South Korean citizenship upon arriving in Seoul in 2009.

After receiving training at the South Korean Ministry of Unification's Hanawon Resettlement Center, Park and her mother settled in Asan. They had difficulty adjusting to life in South Korea, but found jobs as shop assistants and waitresses. Despite arriving in South Korea with only a second-grade education, Park achieved her high school equivalency in 18 months. She was admitted to Dongguk University in Seoul.

=== Now On My Way to Meet You (2011) ===
In 2011, Yeonmi Park participated as Yeju Park in the South Korean reality television program Now On My Way to Meet You, a show that has been credited for launching her career as a public figure. The program – broadcast on Channel A – began as an emotional, dossier-style documentary focusing on the reuniting of North Korean defectors with their families. It later evolved into a variety show featuring young and attractive North Korean defectors, dubbed "defector beauties". According to media academic Richard Murray, Park's ability to speak English, coupled with her being a young, attractive woman, contributed to her rise in popularity with journalists.

Park became known as "the Paris Hilton of North Korea" due to her relatively privileged upbringing in North Korea compared to her co-stars; her family had access to numerous luxury goods. Park's mother, who also appeared on the show, remarked that Park could not comprehend that her less well-off co-stars had come from the same country.

== Life in the United States (2014–present) ==
In 2014, Park was selected as one of the BBC 100 Women. She moved to New York City in 2014 to complete her memoir while continuing to work as an activist. Park became a naturalized U.S. citizen in 2021, and was married to an American man named Ezekiel from 2017 to 2020, with whom she had a son.

In 2015, Park published her memoir, In Order to Live, in which she describes her journey from defection to higher education. She attended classes at Barnard College and was accepted to the Columbia University School of General Studies, starting there in 2016. She graduated from Columbia in 2020.

In 2021, she described her education at Columbia as "forcing you to think the way they want you to think", claiming that she was scolded by a professor for enjoying literature by Jane Austen. Columbia declined to comment on this anecdote. Park criticized political correctness at Columbia, saying, "I thought America was different but I saw so many similarities to what I saw in North Korea that I started worrying", adding, "America is not free". She said, "our education system is brainwashing our children to make them think that this country is racist and make them believe that they are victims."

After her memoir's publication, Park "began presenting a far more harrowing description of life in North Korea than she had shared with South Korean TV fans", according to The Washington Post. Experts on North Korea noted that Park had shifted the tone of her portrayal of life in North Korea after jumping from reality television to speaking at human rights conferences, going from claiming to have lived a life of luxury to claiming to have never seen eggs or indoor toilets.

== Skepticism of claims ==
As early as 2014, journalists began questioning Park's stories; in 2014–2015, John Power, a journalist based in Seoul, wrote two articles criticizing Park's claims and questioning the inconsistencies. In December 2014, Mary Ann Jolley of The Diplomat, who had previously worked with Park on a documentary, wrote about problems with Park's story. The Diplomat also published a response from Park, in which she said that the discrepancies in her stories came from her limited English skills at the time, adding that her "childhood memories were not perfect" and that she had begun to review her accounts more often with her mother.

In the face of the skepticism and criticism that Park's stories have garnered, the coauthor of Park's memoir, Maryanne Vollers, said in 2015 that she believed that Park was the victim of a targeted smear campaign by the North Korean government. Vollers cited past cases where the North Korean government attempted to silence its critics and said that she received a strange "email warning [her] not to write the book" just weeks before a video titled "The Human Rights Propaganda Puppet, Yeon-mi Park" was released on a website run by North Korea. Vollers wrote that she had noticed Park's jumbled recollections, but attributed them to her not yet being fluent in English, to having been trafficked in China and changing details in her story to avoid revealing her secret, and to the effects of survivor trauma on memory processing. Vollers reported that she had "been able to verify [Park's] story through family members and fellow defectors who knew her in North Korea and China".

In 2023, Park's second book, While Time Remains: A North Korean Defector's Search for Freedom in America, was published. It was described as an account of Park's "disenchantment with American liberalism". Will Sommer wrote in The Washington Post, "scholars on North Korea who are skeptical of Park say she's symptomatic of a booming market for horror stories from the cloistered nation that they believe encourages some 'celebrity' defectors to spin increasingly outlandish claims" which will "overshadow genuine concerns about the dire state of human rights there"; these documented abuses include "rape, murder and forced abortions... forced sterilization, executions and 'arbitrary' detentions as part of a long array of 'significant human rights issues' in the country", according to The Washington Post. Kim Byeong-uk, a fellow North Korean defector and the founder of the North Korean Development Institute, has said that Park's stories about life in North Korea are unreliable, telling The Korea Times that Park "exaggerated her past experiences and the way of the North, probably because she wanted to be at the center of attention." Park's stories also drew skepticism from Kim Seong-min, the president of Free North Korea Radio. An Chan-il, the chairman of the World North Korea Research Center, expressed concern that Park's extraordinary stories about life in North Korea would cause people to believe that North Korean defectors are liars. According to The Diplomat, several defectors "worry that Park's inconsistencies and flawed accounts will make the world start to doubt their stories."

38 North, a website dedicated to news of North Korea, has noted that some critics, including other North Korean refugees, have accused Park of embellishing her accounts or appropriating elements from others' escape stories. John Lee, a journalist focusing on South Korean foreign policy and relations with the U.S., criticized Park in an opinion piece in NK News for "muddl[ing] her message with ... nakedly partisan punditry" in favor of conservative causes and media in the U.S. and South Korea.

Political writer A.B. Abrams, while accusing Park of fabricating her stories of life in North Korea, compared Park's life story to both the Nayirah testimony and Colin Powell's presentation to the United Nations Security Council. Michael Bassett, who spent several years in the demilitarized zone as a member of the U.S. military, accused Park of fabricating her stories about North Korea, criticized her use of the word "holocaust" to describe the situation in North Korea, and accused her of working on behalf of free-market think tanks to support economic sanctions against North Korea. The political commentator and journalist Will Sommer has also questioned the reliability of Park's stories about North Korea. Sommer notes parallels between Park's stories and the testimony of Shin Dong-hyuk, who, under pressure from fellow North Korean defectors, admitted that he had lied about key aspects of his life story. Jay Song, a professor of Korean Studies at the University of Melbourne, has expressed skepticism about Park's account of life in North Korea, accusing her of misrepresenting the Korean expat community and alleging that her stories undermined the reputation of fellow North Korean defectors. Christine Hong, a professor at the University of California, Santa Cruz, an expert in North Korean defectors, and a member of the Korea Policy Institute, also criticized Park's stories, saying that her testimony did not match her mother's accounts of life in North Korea.

Communications professor Richard Murray writes that it is common to utilize unreliable defector narratives within news reporting, because journalistic access to North Korea is limited. Murray describes a political dimension to this practice, with right-wing sources more inclined to use defector stories. Laura Jedeed, a journalist, strongly criticized Park's stories of life in North Korea, saying that it was Park's "ability to treat facts as malleable that has allowed Park to find like-minded allies on the MAGA right". Journalist John Power told Murray that both he and his employer "got into a load of shit" after his 2014–2015 articles questioning Park's story were published, saying "I pissed off every right-winger."

=== Execution for watching foreign movies ===
Park claimed that, when she was nine years old, she saw her best friend's mother publicly executed in a stadium in Hyesan. Fellow North Korean defectors from Hyesan said that public executions never happened in stadiums, and that public executions had been halted several years before Park claims she saw one.

According to Park, this woman was executed for watching a film produced outside of North Korea. But Park's account of what movie it was has changed depending on her audience. When speaking in Hong Kong, she claimed the woman had watched South Korean movies; when speaking to audiences in Ireland, she claimed it was a James Bond movie. Park's claims that people in North Korea were executed for watching foreign movies were mocked and criticized by multiple North Korean defectors, who told journalists that Park's story was unlikely.

Andrei Lankov, a professor at Kookmin University and an expert on North Korean politics who has interviewed hundreds of defectors from North Korea, said he was "skeptical whether watching a Western movie would lead to an execution" and that he felt it was unlikely that one would even be arrested for it. He said that public executions in North Korea were reserved for the most extreme crimes, such as murder and involvement in large-scale criminal networks. After these criticisms, Park changed her story:

I have only learned English in the last year or so, and I'm trying hard to improve every day to be a better advocate for my people. I apologize for any misunderstandings. For example, I never said that I saw executions in Hyesan. My friend's mother was executed in a small city in central North Korea where my mother still has relatives (which is why I don't want to name it).

The story of seeing someone executed for watching a foreign movie was not included in Park's memoir.

=== Inconsistencies between Park and her family ===
Park has said that her mother and father had both served prison sentences for alleged crimes in North Korea, but her recollection differs from her mother's. Park said in an interview that she initially believed her father's sentence was 17 to 18 years, but that North Korean records indicated it was 11 years. Park's mother said he was initially sentenced to one year that was extended to ten.

During a BBC interview, Park said her mother was imprisoned for six months after her father was sent to jail. Park's mother said that she was interrogated sporadically over the course of a year and not detained. In some interviews, Park said she and her sister were left alone to live in the mountains after their parents were jailed, and that they survived by eating grass. During a BBC interview, Park changed her story, saying that during this time she lived with her aunt and her sister lived with her uncle. Park's mother also contradicted Park's claims that she was starving, telling the host of Now On My Way To Meet You that Park and her family never faced starvation. In an interview with the libertarian for-profit organization the Freedom Factory, Park recalled her upbringing in Korea, never mentioning starvation, and said she was given two meals daily.

=== Escape from North Korea ===
In 2014, Jolley questioned Park's claim that during her escape from North Korea, she crossed several mountains. Jolley noted that there are no mountains between Park's hometown of Hyesan and China, and that the two countries are instead separated by a river. In response, Park wrote, "And there are mountains you can even see on Google Earth – maybe you call them big hills in English – outside of Hyesan that we crossed to escape." In multiple interviews, Park said she escaped North Korea with both her mother and father, but during the One Young World summit in Dublin, she said that only her mother had accompanied her and that she watched a Chinese man rape her.

In a 2014 speech, Park said she escaped North Korea by being driven in a car into China. In a later speech in Ireland, Park said she fled North Korea on foot and traveled over mountains.

After escaping North Korea for China, Park and her mother then traveled to Mongolia, where according to Park they were both arrested and guards stripped them naked every day. Experts, including Shi-eun Yu, who worked with North Korean defectors for many years, and Kim Hyun-ah, were both highly skeptical of this story. They told journalists that they had never heard of any North Korean defectors being stripped naked in Mongolia. According to Yu, "In the past, the South Korean government has sent counselors over to Mongolia to help North Korean defectors in detention ... so how can defectors be stripped naked every day?"

The Telegraph account says that in January 2008, while the family was living in secret, her father died. The family was unable to formally mourn him, fearing that they would be discovered by Chinese authorities, and buried his remains in a nearby mountain. Park's mother told The Diplomat in 2014 that they had paid two people to help carry his body up the mountain for burial. In one interview, Park said her father died during her escape from North Korea and that she buried him alone. At other times, Park has said she cremated him.

=== 2020 George Floyd protest mugging ===
During a 2021 interview with Joe Rogan, Park claimed that in August 2020, during the George Floyd protests in Chicago, three African-American women attacked and robbed her and her son. Park said that when she tried to call the police after the robbery, a crowd of approximately 20 white bystanders "accused her of being racist". She cited the incident as a catalyst for her "speaking out" and becoming "the enemy of the woke." In the same interview, Park recounted the event, saying: "There's so much crime in Chicago, they are not going to prosecute somebody who robs. And that's when I was thinking, 'This country lost it.'" Park's retelling of the events of the robbery differ from a statement by the Chicago Police Department, according to which Park had been robbed by two people, a man and a woman, and that the woman pleaded guilty to a crime and was sentenced to prison. Park later acknowledged the prosecution in her book While Time Remains.

=== Romance in North Korea ===
During an interview with podcaster Tim Pool, Park said that North Koreans do not have words to describe romantic love outside of admiration for the ruling Kim family. Professors Andrei Lankov of Kookmin University and Jay Song of the University of Melbourne both denied this. Political writer A. B. Abrams called Park's claim "totally ludicrous" and noted the large number of love songs popular in North Korea. Park also said that during her life in North Korea she had never witnessed romantic love in fiction; this was contradicted by her earlier interviews in which she said she had watched romantic movies featuring Cinderella and Snow White and said that watching Titanic caused her to question the North Korean government.

=== Pushing trains in North Korea ===
In her interview with Rogan, Park said that North Korea has only a single train and that people often had to push the train to make it move. Screenshots of this interview were used to turn Park into an internet meme. In a separate interview, Park was told that a train engine alone can weigh 100 to 200 tons, close to the weight of the Statue of Liberty or an adult blue whale. Park responded that she had never seen people pushing trains in North Korea, though she believed that it did happen and claimed she had photographs to prove it. She sent three of these photos to journalist Laura Jadeed, but Jadeed wrote that none of them showed people pushing trains.

=== Other North Korea claims ===
Stories Park told about life in North Korea were mocked by writers for Dazed, including her claims that there is no ice cream in North Korea, that North Korea has a single train that runs only once a month that passengers have to push, and that children in North Korea eat mud. Park's claims that human corpses commonly float down North Korean rivers were criticized by Swiss businessman Felix Abt, who lived and worked in the DPRK for seven years.

Other claims about North Korea Park made were debunked by Andrei Lankov, including that North Koreans have no access to world maps, and that they are not taught basic math, including that "$1+1=2$".

A. B. Abrams criticized other claims by Park, including that North Korea has no access to the internet and only a single television channel. Responding to Park's claim that North Koreans are unaware of Africa's existence, Abrams pointed out that almost every middle and senior school in North Korea has a world map that includes Africa and that students from multiple African countries, including Uganda, Zimbabwe, Senegal, and Nigeria, have put on shows in Pyongyang. Abrams also questioned Park's claims that all North Koreans over 4 feet 10 inches tall were conscripted into the military, saying: "Of hundreds of North Koreans the writer has met and the dozens to whom he has spoken about the military, none recalled ever being conscripted and all were over five foot."

== Political and social views ==
Park believes that there are positive and negative possibilities for North Korea to be reunified with South Korea, and that there are neither northerners nor southerners in Korea, just Koreans.

On social issues, Park wrote in her second book that she believes Columbia University brainwashed one of her classmates into believing they were oppressed because they were nonbinary. Park believes the U.S. is a "tolerant country"; she criticized African-American track and field athlete Gwen Berry for turning away from the national anthem at the U.S. Olympic track and field trials for the 2020 Tokyo Olympics in protest of racial and social injustices.

According to the National Review, Park presumes that "the regime adjusts, as the Chinese Communists and the Vietnamese Communists have done. That would allow the North Korean Communists to hang on for untold years longer." She has stated that the Jangmadang (the black market of North Korea), will transform or develop the country's society by providing access to outside news media and information. According to Park, "If I ever return to a reformed North Korea, I will be thrilled to meet my peers as we attempt to bring wealth and freedom to people who were forced into poverty by the Kim family dynasty." She considers Kim Jong Un to be a "cruel" leader.

Park is outspoken against tourism to North Korea, as visitors are encouraged to bow to statues of Kim Jong Il and Kim Il Sung, which she sees as "[aiding] the regime's propaganda by allowing themselves to be portrayed as if they too love and obey the leader".

Park believes that left-wing political ideologies are the dominant ideologies in American society. She has also stated that she believes that the United States is close to becoming a "liberal dictatorship", and that "'cancel culture' at U.S. colleges is the first step toward North Korean-style firing squads", according to The Washington Post. Park said of her experience at university that "they were demonising capitalism, free markets and Western civilisation. Anything that was white was bad" and that discussions of sex and gender on campuses is "crazier than North Korea".

Park is a Christian, and has attributed South Korea's economic success to its adoption of Christianity. She said, "I don't know what the connection is, but South Korea became very blessed when they embraced Christianity". Christianity is the most popular religion in South Korea, although the majority of South Koreans identify as irreligious.

=== Israel–Gaza war ===
Following the October 7 attacks in Southern Israel, Park posted "We stand with Israel, show no mercy to terror" on X (Twitter).

During the Gaza war, Park defended Israel by comparing their bombing of Gaza to the American bombing of Japan and Germany during WWII, telling the audience that "freedom does have a price." She also said she is considerate of both sides of the war.

== Media, speaking and internet presence ==
Park has written and spoken publicly about her life in North Korea, has written for The Washington Post, and has been interviewed by The Guardian and for the Australian public affairs show Dateline. She was a co-host on five episodes for Casey Lartigue, a talk show host of the podcast North Korea Today, which focuses on North Korean topics and the lives of refugees after their escapes. Park has told the story of her defection at several well-known events, including TEDx in Bath, the One Young World summit in Dublin, and the Oslo Freedom Forum.

Park is a member of the Helena Group think tank.

At a speaking engagement at Texas Tech University in April 2021, Park claimed that speech criticizing the North Korean Supreme Leader had become a crime in South Korea, possibly referring to South Korea's passing of an amendment to the "Inter-Korean Relations Development Act" prohibiting South Koreans from sending, amongst other things, anti-Pyongyang leaflets, auxiliary storage devices (for example, USB drives), and money or other monetary benefits to North Korea. In 2021, she was a guest on the podcast of YouTuber Tim Pool, on the Joe Rogan podcast, and made an appearance as a guest on a talk show belonging to American conservative Candace Owens. At the Objectivist Conference -- OCON -- in summer of 2023 in Miami, Yeonmi Park was a guest speaker.

According to the conservative media outlet Campus Reform, in 2023 students at Syracuse University tore down posters advertising a speech by Park, and used online platforms to accuse her of lying. She appeared on a February 2023 podcast of Fox News presenter Megyn Kelly, who acknowledged that many aspects of Park's stories had shifted, before telling her audiences that she had verified Park's stories about Korea. In the same month, she appeared on the show of comedian Andrew Schulz.

In November 2023, Park was paid to give a speech at Wake Forest University at an event hosted by the conservative group Young Americans for Freedom. In response the university's student paper, Old Gold & Black, published multiple articles with differing opinions on the event. Despite their differences, all the articles generally agreed that Park's stories about life in North Korea were unreliable. In the same month Park also spoke at the University of Iowa, where many of the students were also reported to have questioned the validity of her stories.

=== Existence as an internet meme ===
In early 2023, a screenshot of Yeonmi Park's interview with Joe Rogan became an internet meme; the format of the meme is a screenshot accompanied by a caption detailing an unbelievable story. According to the editor of Know Your Meme, Don Caldwell, "The joke is that she'll say anything that's just wildly outlandish, and Joe will just accept it as true."

=== Finances ===
Yeonmi Park stated in 2023 that she was paid $6,600 per month by Turning Point USA, and had engagements with numerous "conservative audiences", according to The New York Times. Park has also received support from Atlas Network, a non-governmental organization that provides services which include training, networking as well as grants for libertarian, conservative and free-market groups around the world.

In 2015, Park's speaking agent told NK News that Park charged between $12,500 and $17,500 plus expenses for each speech. Park's book deal with Penguin Publishing for her first book was reported to have been worth $1.1 million.

== Bibliography ==
- Park, Yeonmi; Vollers, Maryanne (September 29, 2015). In Order to Live: A North Korean Girl's Journey to Freedom. New York: Penguin Press. ISBN 978-0-698-40936-1. OCLC 921419691.
- Park, Yeonmi (February 14, 2023). While Time Remains: A North Korean Defector's Search for Freedom in America. New York: Simon & Schuster. ISBN 978-1-668-00333-6.

Yeonmi Park's first book was her memoirs titled In Order to Live: A North Korean Girl's Journey to Freedom (2015), which was published in the United States by Penguin Press. It was created as a collaboration between Park and the veteran ghost writer Maryanne Vollers, who had previously worked with notable public figures including Hillary Clinton and Ashley Judd. As of July 2023 In Order to Live had sold over 100,000 copies.

Park's second book, While Time Remains: A North Korean Defector's Search for Freedom in America (2023), included a foreword written by the conservative commentator Jordan Peterson. It was published in the United States by a "conservative imprint of Simon & Schuster", according to The Washington Post, which says it contains allegations of censorship and cancel culture on American college campuses, "warning that America is on the verge of liberal dictatorship". It has sold over 130,000 copies as of June 2023.

In the acknowledgements, Park thanks a variety of American conservative media personalities, including the YouTuber Dave Rubin and Emma-Jo Morris, who is the editor for Breitbart News. Park's spokesperson and literary agent, Jonathan Bronitsky, is the former chief speech writer for William P. Barr, the 2016–2020 Trump administration's attorney general.

== See also ==
- Lee Hyeon-seo
- Lee Soon-ok
- Shin Dong-hyuk
- Jumana Hanna
- Media coverage of North Korea
- Nayirah testimony
- Colin Powell's presentation to the United Nations Security Council
