= Citizens for a Free Kuwait =

Astroturf operation after the Iraqi invasion of Kuwait

Citizens for a Free Kuwait (CFK) was an astroturf operation established by the Kuwaiti government to persuade the American public to look favourably at US military action in the Persian Gulf (the subsequent Operation Desert Storm). Its principal payment was to public relations firm Hill & Knowlton, who was associated with the false testimony to the US Congress given by Nayirah al-Ṣabaḥ.

== Congressional Human Rights Caucus ==
In October 1990 Nayirah, a teenage girl, testified before the Congressional Human Rights Caucus, that she had seen Iraqi soldiers remove hundreds of Kuwaiti babies from incubators and leave them to die on hospital floors. The chairmen of the congressional group explained that the witness's identity would be kept secret to protect her family in occupied Kuwait. President George H. W. Bush cited the incubator story six times in speeches and seven senators cited the story as a reason for voting to give the Bush administration authorization for the Gulf War. The atrocities of the Iraqis in Kuwait were compared to that of the Nazis.

== Investigations ==
After the Liberation of Kuwait campaign, an ABC News reporter interviewed hospital doctors who stayed in Kuwait throughout the Iraqi occupation and indicated that the story was almost certainly false. Subsequent investigation showed that unknown to most members of the Caucus, the 15-year-old Kuwait girl was the daughter of the Kuwaiti ambassador to the United States, Saud bin Nasir Al-Sabah. As one reporter observed, such knowledge might have led to demands of proof of Nayirah's whereabouts when she said she witnessed the atrocities and calls for corroboration of the story.

The congressmen co-chairing the committee, who knew the true identity of the teen-age witness, had close relationships with Hill and Knowlton, the public relations firm hired by Citizens for a Free Kuwait, the group financed by Kuwait which lobbied for Congress for U.S. military intervention. A vice president of Hill and Knowlton helped organize the congressional hearings. The same Hill & Knowlton vice president had previously defended the human rights record of Turkey, which had been criticized for jailing people without due process and torturing and killing them. He also lobbied for Hill & Knowlton on behalf of Indonesia, which has, since 1975, killed more than 100,000 people in East Timor.

A video of Iraq's invasion of Kuwait was the second most used PR video release in 1990, with 61 million viewers. It was produced by Hill & Knowlton for Citizens for a Free Kuwait.

== Response from Hill & Knowlton ==
In a letter of rebuttal, the president and CEO of Hill & Knowlton, Thomas E. Eidson, wrote that the firm had not at any time collaborated with anyone to produce knowingly deceptive testimony, that Nayirah was inside Kuwait at the time in question and had volunteered to work under an assumed name at the Al-Adan Hospital, and that the United States embassy confirmed that she was in Kuwait at the time. He also cited testimony to the United Nations by the head of the Kuwaiti Red Crescent citing firsthand involvement in burying newborn babies taken from their incubators by soldiers.

== See also ==
- To Sell a War – A documentary film covering the story
- Nayirah testimony
