= Mohammad Abulhasan =

Kuwaiti minister and ambassador

Mohammad Abdullah Abulhasan Advisor in Al-Diwan Al-Amiri, Kuwait
- Born: January 12, 1943 (age 83); Kuwait City, Kuwait
- Education: University of Cairo
- Known for: Kuwaiti permanent representative to the United Nations in New York
- Children: 5

Mohammad Abdullah Abulhasan (born January 12, 1943) is a Kuwaiti former Minister and Ambassador, who is currently an Advisor in the Kuwaiti Emir's palace. He held several political positions in Kuwait, among which a minister in the Ministry of Information, as well as in Kuwaiti embassies in several countries. Abulhasan was the Ambassador to the UN during the Iraqi invasion of Kuwait.

== Career ==
Abulhasan began his career as a diplomat in the Ministry of Foreign Affairs in Kuwait from 1965 to 1968. He subsequently joined the Mission of the State of Kuwait to the United Nations in Geneva until 1973, before serving as First Secretary in the Kuwaiti Embassy in Tehran, Iran, from 1973 to 1975. He then served as Kuwaiti Ambassador to the People's Republic of China (1975-1978) and Yugoslavia (1978-1981). While Ambassador to Yugoslavia, he was simultaneously non-resident Ambassador for Hungary and the German Democratic Republic.

From 1981 until 2003, he was the Permanent Representative of the State of Kuwait to the United Nations, serving concurrently as non-resident Ambassador to Cuba, Argentina, Mexico and the Bahamas. During this time, Abulhasan was Chairman of the Board of Trustees of the Islamic Cultural Center of New York, and oversaw the design and construction of the first comprehensive Islamic center in New York City, which was inaugurated by Jaber Al-Ahmad Al-Sabah in 1991. He represented Kuwait at a number of international conferences, including the summits of the Non-Aligned Movement in 1983 (India), 1986 (Zimbabwe), 1989 (Yugoslavia), 1992 (Indonesia), and 1995 (Colombia).

In 2003 he was appointed Minister of Information of Kuwait, and in 2005 became an advisor to the Kuwaiti Prime Minister. In 2007 he became an advisor at Al Diwan Al Amiri. In 2009 he was appointed as a Special Kuwaiti Envoy to the United States.
