= Mohammad Sabah Al-Salem Al-Sabah =

Kuwaiti royal and former Prime Minister (born 1955)

His Highness Sheikh Mohammad Sabah Al-Salem Al-Sabah
- الشيخ الدكتور محمد صباح السالم الصباح
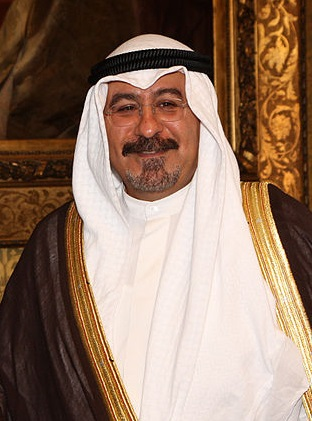
- Al-Sabah in 2011

10th Prime Minister of Kuwait
- In office 17 January 2024 – 15 May 2024
- Monarch: Mishal Al Ahmad
- Preceded by: Ahmad Al Nawaf
- Succeeded by: Ahmad Al Abdullah

Deputy Prime Minister of Kuwait
- In office 9 February 2006 – 18 October 2011
- Prime Minister: Nasser Al Sabah
- Preceded by: Sabah Al Ahmad
- Succeeded by: Jaber Al-Mubarak

3rd Minister of Foreign Affairs
- In office 14 July 2003 – 18 October 2011
- Prime Minister: Sabah Al Ahmed; Nasser Al Sabah
- Preceded by: Sabah Al Ahmad
- Succeeded by: Sabah Al-Khalid

Ambassador of Kuwait to the United States
- In office 15 January 1993 – 2003
- Prime Minister: Saad Al Sabah
- Preceded by: Saud Nasser Al-Saud
- Succeeded by: Salem Abdullah Al-Jaber

Personal details
- Born: 10 October 1955 (age 70) Kuwait City, Kuwait
- Relations: Salem (brother); Ali (brother)
- Parent: Sabah Al-Salim Al-Sabah (father)
- Education: Claremont McKenna College (BA); Harvard University (PhD)

His Highness Sheikh Dr. Mohammad Sabah Al-Salem Al-Sabah (Arabic: الشيخ الدكتور محمد صباح السالم الصباح, romanized: ash-Shaykh ad-Doctor Muḥammad Sabāh as-Sālim as-Sabāh; born 10 October 1955) is a senior member of the Kuwaiti royal family and has held various key positions as a politician, economist, and diplomat. He served as the Prime Minister of Kuwait from 17 January 2024 to 15 May 2024. Prior to his premiership, he was the Deputy Prime Minister of Kuwait, contributing significantly to the nation’s governance and international relations.

== Early life and education ==
Born on 10 October 1955, Al-Sabah is a son of Sheikh Sabah III Al-Salim Al-Sabah, the former Amir of Kuwait, and Nouriya Al-Ahmad Al-Sabah, the sister of the present Amir. His older brother is Salem Sabah Al-Salem Al-Sabah, who served as both Minister of Defense and Interior. Mohammed Sabah Al Sabah obtained his bachelor's degree in economics from Claremont McKenna College and went on to earn both a master's degree and a PhD in economics and Middle Eastern studies from Harvard University.

== Career ==
=== Government service ===
Appointed in 1993 as the ambassador of Kuwait to the United States, he served until 14 February 2001, at which point he became the Minister of Foreign Affairs. He held the position of Minister of Finance from January 2003 until July 2003. On 11 February 2006, he was appointed Deputy Prime Minister, continuing also as the Minister of Foreign Affairs.

He resigned from office on 18 October 2011 in protest of alleged corruption in Kuwait's government. He subsequently pursued academic interests as a visiting fellow at Oxford University.

=== Prime minister ===
On January 4, 2024, Sheikh Mishal Al-Ahmad Al-Jaber Al-Sabah, the Emir of Kuwait, appointed Sheikh Mohammad Sabah Al-Salem Al-Sabah as the Prime Minister designate of Kuwait. He was sworn into office on the 17 of January 2024, marking the first time in 20 years that a descendant of the Banu Salim branch of the Kuwaiti ruling family assumed this position. Sheikh Ahmad Al-Abdullah Al-Sabah was appointed as the prime minister-designate on 15 April 2024. His assumption of office is contingent upon the formation of his cabinet and his oath-taking before the National Assembly. Following this appointment, Sheikh Mohammed has been serving as the acting prime minister in a caretaker capacity.

== Personal life ==
Al-Sabah is married to Feryal Duaij Al Salman Al Sabah and has four children.

== Councils, committees and memberships ==
=== Kuwait ===
- Chairman of the board of directors of the Kuwait Fund for Arab Economic Development (2003–2011)
- Member of the Supreme Council of the Environment Public Authority (2003–2011)
- Member of the National Security Council (2003–2011)
- Member of the Supreme Council for Planning and Development (2006–2011)
- Member of the Kuwait National Nuclear Energy Committee (2009–2011)
- Acting Chairman of the Civil Service Commission (2003–2011)
- Board Advisor Center for International Relations and Sustainable Development

== Honours and awards ==
- 2014 Robert and JoAnn Bendetson Global Leadership Award in Public Diplomacy from Fletcher School at Tufts University
- 1978 Recipient of The Salvatori Scholar Prize
