= Ministry of Interior (Kuwait) =

Government ministry of Kuwait

Ministerial Department overview
- Formed: 17 January 1962; 64 years ago
- Preceding Ministerial Department: Directorate of Public Security Force Police Directorate (1938–1962)
- Jurisdiction: Government of Kuwait
- Headquarters: Kuwait City
- Motto: الله والوطن والامير; God, Country and The Emir
- Minister responsible: Sheikh Fahad Yusuf Al-Sabah
- Child agencies: Office of the Minister of Interior; Office of the Interior Undersecretary; Military Offices of the Assistant Undersecretaries of the Kuwait Police; Offices of the Assistant Undersecretaries of the Kuwait Police
- Website: www.moi.gov.kw

The Ministry of Interior (Arabic: وزارة الداخلية الكويتية) is one of the governmental bodies of Kuwait. Its minister in charge is a member of the Cabinet of Kuwait and the current minister of interior is Sheikh Fahad Yousef Al-Sabah.

== History ==
The early organization which dealt with internal affairs was the Directorate of Public Security Force, formed during the Interwar period in 1938 by Ahmad Al-Jaber Al-Sabah and mainly taking effect following World War II. Prior to 1938, internal security was dependent on the Defense Security Forces which were headed by Sheikh Ali Salem Al-Mubarak Al-Sabah. Following the Battle of Al-Regeai, command of the Defense and Security Forces was assigned to Shiekh Abdullah Jaber Al-Abdullah II Al-Sabah, who was appointed by Sheikh Ahmad Al-Jaber Al-Sabah and was commanding from 1928 to 1938.

== Directors (1938–1962) ==
The Kuwait Army split from the Directorate of Public Security Force in 1953; subsequently, the latter merged with Directorate of Police to form Directorate of Public Security and Police in 1959; following the demolition of the defensive wall of Kuwait in 1957 which later formed the Kuwait Ministry of Interior including the Kuwait Police.

=== Directors of the Directorate of Public Security Force, Directorate of Police and Kuwait Army ===
#	Name	Rank	Tenure From	Tenure Until	Note
1	Sheikh Ali Khalifa Al-Abdullah II Al-Sabah	General Commander	1938	1942	Lead Cavalry Commander during the Battle of Jahra and the Battle of Al-Regeai
2	Sheikh Abdullah Mubarak Al-Sabah	Field Marshal	1942	1961	General Commander of Kuwait Army and Directorate of Public Security Force (1942-1961) until the two split in 1953. Founder and patron of the Kuwaiti Army and Kuwaiti Air Force. Field Marshal of Kuwait Army, Kuwait Air Force (1949-1961) prior to the forming of the Chief of the General Staff of Kuwait Armed Forces in (1963); Abdullah Al-Mubarak Air Base is named after him.

=== Directors of the Directorate of Public Security Force and Directorate of Police (1959) ===
#	Name	Rank	Tenure From	Tenure Until	Note
1	Sabah Salem Al-Mubarak Al-Sabah	President	1953	1959	Pioneer in the early forming of the Directorate of Police since 1938. 12th Ruler and 2nd Emir of Kuwait.
2	Saad Abdullah Al-Salem Al-Sabah	General Commander	1961	1962	General Commander of the Directorate of the Public Security Force and Directorate of Police. First military officer to head the Kuwait Ministry of Defense since 1964. First military officer to head the Kuwait Ministry of Interior since 1962.

== Deputy Directors (1938–1962) ==
In 1953 and aside of the Police Directorate; the Kuwait Army split from the Directorate of Public Security Force which gave rise to the Kuwaiti Ministry of Interior and Ministry of Defense following the country's independence.

=== Deputy Directors of the Directorate of Public Security Force, Directorate of Police and Kuwait Army (1938–1962) ===
#	Name	Rank	Tenure From	Tenure Until	Note
1	Sheikh Abdullah Al-Mubarak Al-Sabah	Deputy Commander	1938	1942	
2	Sheikh Saad Abdullah Al-Salem Al-Sabah	Deputy Commander	1959	1961	Deputy Commander of the Directorate of Police in 1959. Deputy Commander of Directorate of Public Security Force and Directorate of Police in 1959.

=== Deputy Commander of the Kuwait Army (1953–1954) ===
#	Name	Rank	Tenure From	Tenure Until	Note
1	Mubarak Abdullah Al-Jaber Al-Sabah	Captain	1953	1954	Deputy commander of Kuwait Army (1954-1963) partnering Directorate of Public Security Force until 1953. Founder and patron of Kuwait 25th Commando Brigade in 1960. 1st Chief of the General Staff of the Kuwait Armed Forces in 1963. The Mubarak al-Abdullah Joint Command and Staff College is named after him.

== List of ministers of interior and deputy prime ministers (1962–present) ==
The ministers of interior of Kuwait since 1962:

#	Name	Title	Interior Tenure From	Interior Tenure Until	Note
1	Saad Abdullah Al-Salem Al-Sabah	Deputy Prime Minister and Minister of Interior	17 January 1962	16 February 1978	14th Ruler and 4th Emir of Kuwait (2006), The Father Emir. Saad Al-Abdullah Academy for Security Sciences, which is in charge of training personnel of the Kuwait Police, is named after him.
2	Sabah Al-Ahmad Al-Jaber Al-Sabah	Deputy Prime Minister and Minister of Interior	16 February 1978	18 March 1978	15th Ruler and 5th Emir of Kuwait (2006–2020).
3	Nawaf Al-Ahmad Al-Jaber Al-Sabah	Deputy Prime Minister and Minister of Interior	19 March 1978	12 July 1986	Crown Prince of Kuwait (2006–2020), 16th Ruler and 6th Emir of Kuwait.
4	Salem Sabah Al-Salem Al-Sabah	Deputy Prime Minister and Minister of Interior	26 January 1988	20 June 1990	
5	Sheikh Ahmad Al Homoud Al Sabah	Deputy Prime Minister and Minister of Interior	20 April 1991	17 October 1992	
6	Sheikh Ali Sabah Al-Salem Al-Sabah	Deputy Prime Minister and Minister of Interior	13 April 1994	15 October 1996	Ali Al-Sabah Military College, which is in charge of training personnel of the Kuwait Armed Forces, is named after him.
7	Mohammad Al Khalid Al Sabah	Deputy Prime Minister and Minister of Interior	15 October 1996	13 July 2003	
8	Nawaf Al-Ahmad Al-Jaber Al-Sabah	Deputy Prime Minister and Minister of Interior	13 July 2003	9 February 2006	Crown Prince of Kuwait (2006–2020).
9	Jaber Al-Mubarak Al-Hamad Al-Sabah	Deputy Prime Minister and Minister of Interior	9 February 2006	28 October 2007	Prime Minister of Kuwait (2011–2019).
10	Sheikh Jaber Al Khaled Al Sabah	Deputy Prime Minister and Minister of Interior	28 October 2007	6 February 2011	Chief of the General Staff of Kuwait Armed Forces (1992-1993) following the Gulf War.
11	Sheikh Ahmad Al Homoud Al Sabah	Deputy Prime Minister and Minister of Interior	6 February 2011	4 August 2013	
12	Mohammad Al Khalid Al Sabah	Deputy Prime Minister and Minister of Interior	4 August 2013	10 December 2016	
13	Khaled Al Jarrah Al Sabah	Deputy Prime Minister and Minister of Interior	11 December 2016	18 November 2019	(ret) Lieutenant General and Chief of the General Staff of the Kuwait Armed Forces (2012–2013)
14	Anas Khalid Al Saleh	Deputy Prime Minister and Minister of Interior	17 December 2019	14 December 2020	
15	Thamer Ali Sabah Al-Salem Al-Sabah	Minister of Interior	14 December 2020	14 November 2021	Acting Minister until 27 December 2021
16	Ahmad Mansour Al-Ahmad Al-Sabah	Deputy Prime Minister and Minister of Interior	28 December 2021	16 February 2022	
17	Dr. Mohammad Abdullatif Al-Fares	Minister of Interior (Acting)	17 February 2022	8 March 2022	
18	Ahmad Nawaf Al-Ahmad Al-Sabah	First Deputy Prime Minister and Minister of Interior	9 March 2022	24 July 2022	Retired General
19	Talal Khaled Al-Ahmad Al-Sabah	First Deputy Prime Minister and Minister of Defense and Acting Minister of Interior	27 July 2022	2 October 2022	
20	Talal Khaled Al-Ahmad Al-Sabah	First Deputy Prime Minister and Minister of Interior	16 October 2022	17 January 2024	
21	Fahad Yusuf Al-Sabah	First Deputy Prime Minister and Acting Minister of Interior	17 January 2024	Present	Retired military officer

== Defense and interior command prior to 1961 ==
=== Battle General Commanders of Defense and Security Forces (1928–1938) ===
#	Name	Rank	Tenure From	Tenure Until	Note
1	Sheikh Ali Salem Al-Mubarak Al-Sabah	General Cavalry Commander	1921	1928	killed during the Battle of Al-Regeai. Ali Al Salem Air Base is named after him.
2	Sheikh Abdullah Jaber Al-Abdullah II Al-Sabah	General Cavalry Commander	1928	1938	pioneer in the early stages of the Military of Kuwait.

== Organization and activities ==
The major responsibilities of the ministry are public security, and maintenance of law and order. The major internal security organization under the ministry is the national police. The ministry is also responsible for managing the election process together with the ministry of justice.

The ministry has 48 service centers and 62 police stations in Capital, Farwaniya, Jahra, Hawalli, Ahmadi, and Mubarak Al Kabir regions across Kuwait. In 2008, a rehabilitation center was launched in the ministry in order to deal with those Kuwaiti citizens holding radical religious views. The ministry established special teams consisting of members of non-governmental organizations to eliminate vote-buying before the 2012 general elections.

The ministry in 2024 has been working to combat the surge of drugs, holding those accountable for forgery in citizenship and those with dual citizenships, to implement and pass through new traffic laws, building its data base with the biometric system and many other things.
