= Fayeq Abdul-Jaleel =

Kuwaiti poet and prisoner of war

Fayeq Mohammed Ali Al-Ayadhi
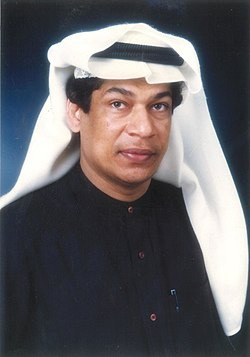
- Fayeq Abdul-Jaleel
- Born: Fayeq Mohammed Ali Al-Ayadhi; May 5, 1948; Kuwait
- Disappeared: January 3, 1991 (aged 42)
- Status: Declared dead June 18, 2006 (aged 58)
- Died: His remains were found in a mass grave in Iraq desert, West of Karbala city.
- Cause of death: Executed – Bullet wound to the head
- Resting place: Kuwait, Al-Sulaibikat cemetery
- Occupation: Poet
- Years active: 1964–1990

Signature
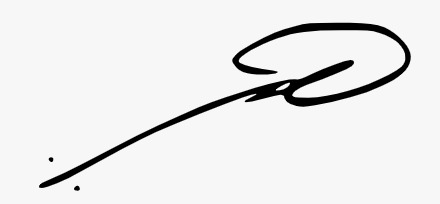

Fayeq Mohammed Al-Ayadhi (Arabic: فائق محمد علي العياضي) (born May 5, 1948), better known by his pen name Fayeq Abdul-Jaleel (Arabic: فائق عبدالجليل), was a Kuwaiti poet, playwright and lyricist. He was captured by Iraqi forces during the invasion of Kuwait in 1990. He was one of more than 600 Kuwaiti civilians who were held as prisoners of war by Saddam Hussein's government. He was missing until his remains were unearthed in the Iraqi desert west of Karbala in 2004, where he was executed and buried in a mass grave.

== Life and work ==
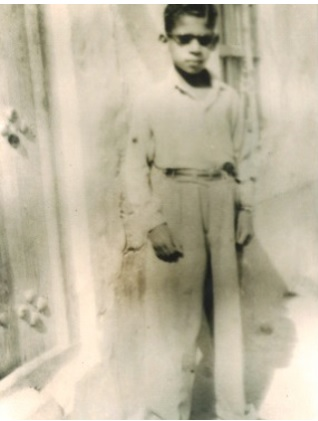
Abdul Jaleel in Kuwait in the 1950s.

Fayeq Abdul-Jaleel was born in Kuwait City and started out as a painter before coming to prominence at the age of 19 with a collection of poems entitled Wasmiah and the Stalks of Childhood (1967). He adopted the name Abdul Jaleel as his pen name in honor of his uncle Abdul Jaleel who raised him.

Abdul Jaleel went on to publish several more books of verse and also penned the lyrics to several songs that became popular in the Arab world, collaborating with singers including Mohammed Abdu (Abaad, Layla, Layla, Filjaw Ghaim), Talal Maddah and Abu Baker Salem, and many well known singers. He also wrote several plays performed in his homeland, including Kuwait's first puppet play (1974), and was active in the administration of Kuwait's national theater company. His signature style was to write in an Arabic somewhere between the formalism of the classical language and the regionally tinged spoken vernacular. He saw poetry as political, something that could act as an engine of social change. "Poetry," he wrote in a verse from 1968, "is one grain of wheat which enters all ovens and bakeries to feed all the people." His poetry also reflected a deep attachment to Kuwait itself and a sense of foreboding about his own ultimate fate – earning him comparisons to the great Spanish Civil War-era poet Federico Garcia Lorca.

To earn a living, Abdul-Jaleel worked for the municipality of Kuwait City and also acted as an advocate for the arts for the Kuwaiti Information Ministry, traveling extensively throughout the Arab world. He also ran his own advertising agency. He married his cousin Salma Al-Abdi in 1967 and had five children: Gadah (born 1971), Fares (1972), Raja (1978), Sara (1983) and Nouf (1985).

== The Iraqi invasion of Kuwait ==
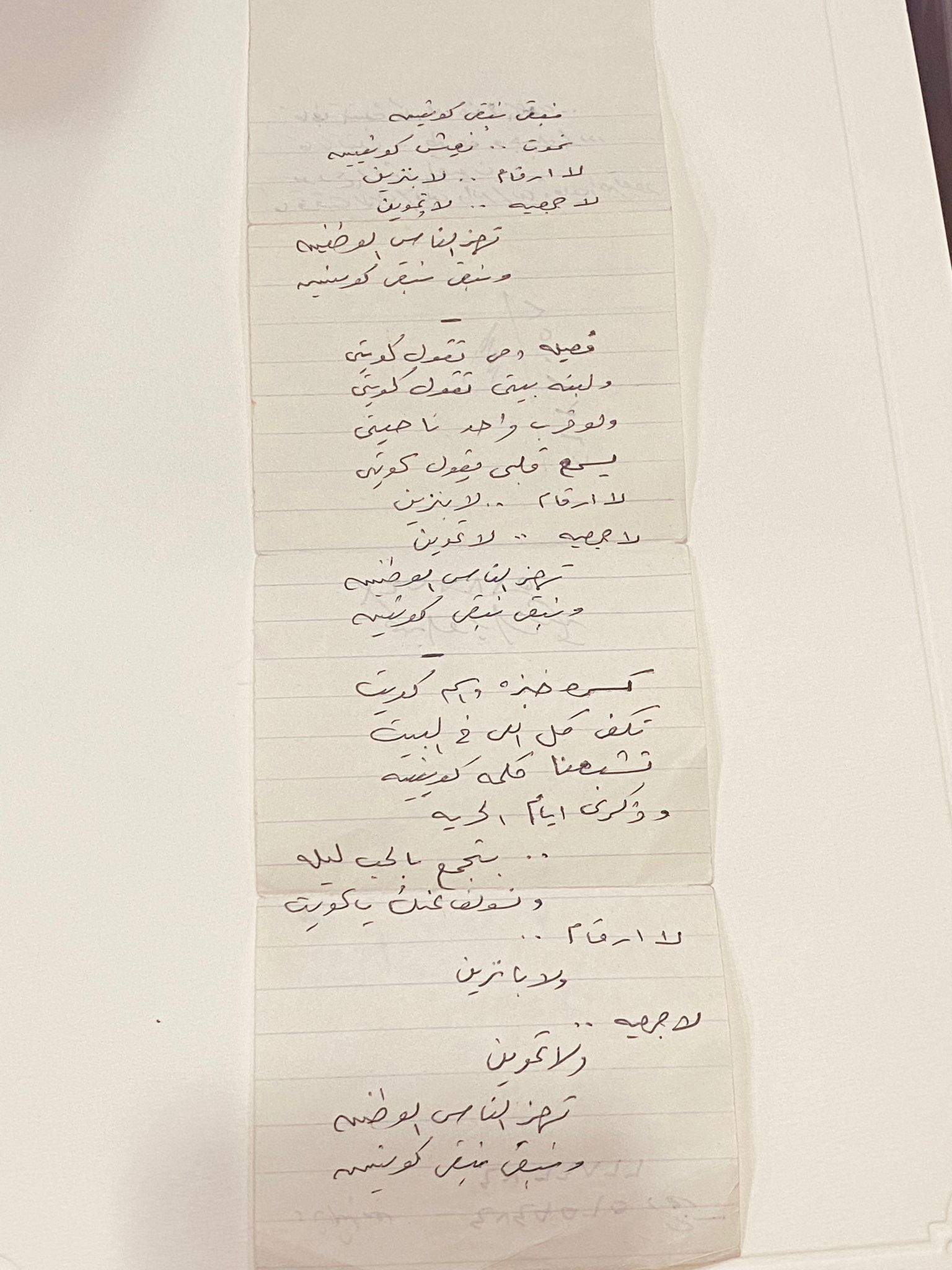
Poem which is in the handwriting of the poet.This heartfelt poem was written during the occupation of Kuwait to inspire Kuwaitis with his songs and poems.

When Iraqi forces unexpectedly overran Kuwait on August 2, 1990, Abdul-Jaleel was caught in Kuwait City with his wife and four-year-old daughter Nouf. He embarked on a high-risk adventure to drive his wife and child to the desert border with Saudi Arabia, but chose not to leave with them, telling his wife he wanted to put a few affairs in order before joining the family overseas. In the end, he could not bear to leave – as he ended up explaining in a letter to his loved ones that was recovered after the end of the 1991 Gulf War from the family's kitchen table.

Rather, he joined a loose civilian resistance movement as poet along with a handful of fellow musicians and friends. Together, they wrote and recorded poems and music intended to embolden the Kuwaiti population against the invaders. They had a whole system in place, involving a network of women who hid the cassettes they recorded in the fold of abayahs and distributed them from house to house.

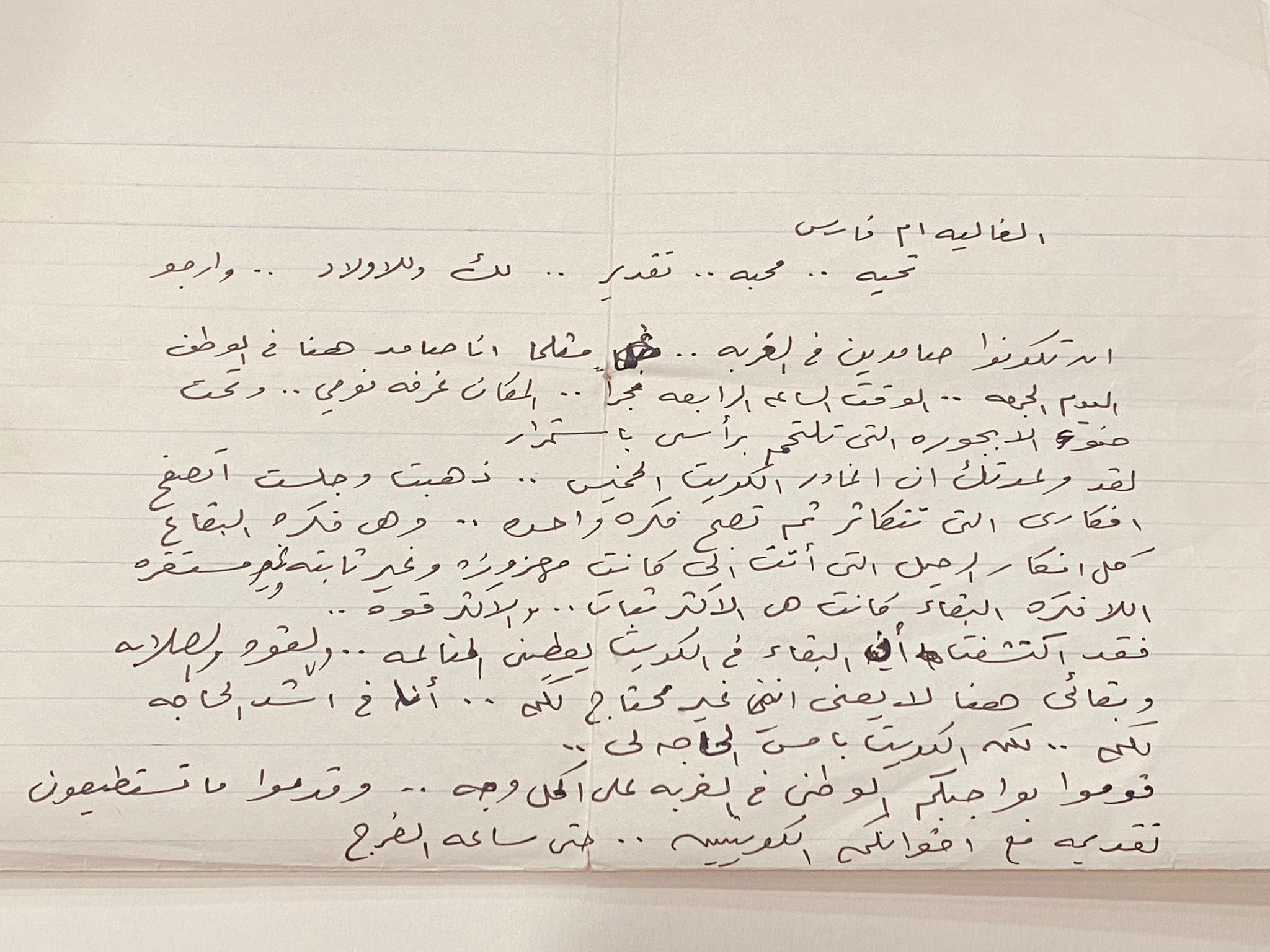
Last letter the poet wrote to his wife. The letter she found when she returned to Kuwait but her husband was imprisoned.

They were, however, victims of their own success. Kuwaitis talked so much about the poems and songs that the Iraqis got wind of them, worked out who was responsible and, on January 3, 1991, arrested the lot of them. Poem we stay Kuwaiti

We stay Kuwaiti

We stay... We stay Kuwaiti

We die and live as Kuwaiti

No numbers, no benzene

No society... No supply

To shake the patriotic people

And we stay... We stay Kuwaiti

November – 199

== Prisoner of war ==
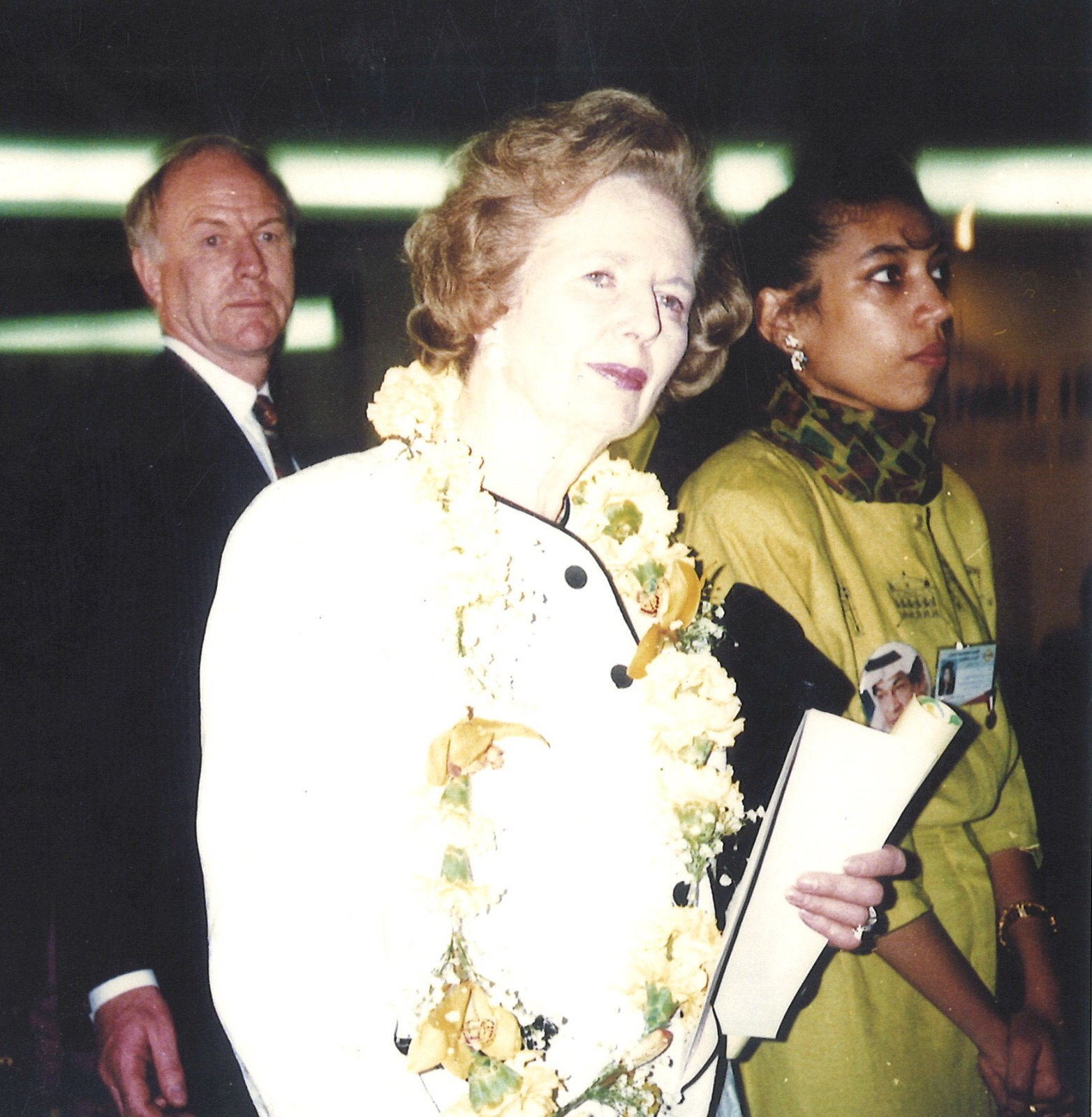
Prime Minister Margaret Thatcher and Gadah Al-Ayadhi, eldest daughter of Abdul Jaleel.

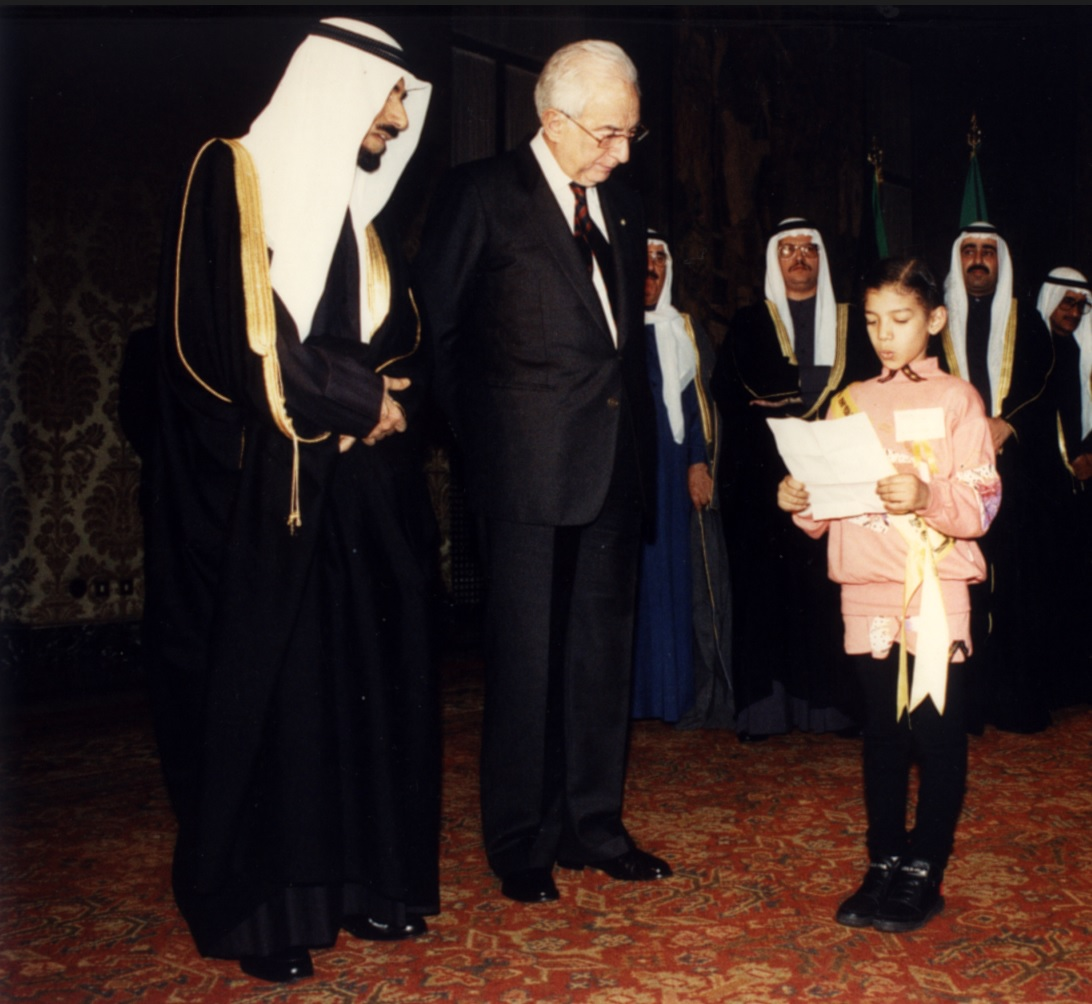
Daughter of Abdul Jaleel, Sara Al-Ayadhi, in Rome with the Emir of Kuwait Jaber Al-Ahmad Al-Sabah in the Italian Presidential palace with Italian President Francesco Cossiga.

After the liberation of Kuwait, the State of Kuwait carried out international efforts spearheaded by the Emir of Kuwait, Sheikh Jaber Al-Ahmad Al-Sabah, to secure the release of Kuwaiti prisoners of war taken by Iraq. Al Sabah took Abdul Jaleel's daughters on international state visits, where they read letters asking heads of states to help secure the release of Abdul Jaleel as well as other Kuwaiti prisoners in Iraq.

== A letter from prison ==
In 2000, the Kuwaiti authorities found an ambiguous letter in the handwriting of the poet Fayeq Abdul-Jaleel, which was received by a Mauritanian novelist, who was invited to a cultural conference in Iraq. An unknown person (believed to be one of the security elements attached to the Special Security Agency of Qusay Saddam Hussein) came to her carrying that message to her for the purpose of delivering it to the Kuwaiti diplomatic mission in the Mauritanian capital (Nouakchott). The details of that story were mentioned in a television interview with the official concerned with the issue of Kuwaiti prisoners at the Ministry of Interior at that time:

I am the poet Fayeq Abdul -Jaleel, I am in Basra, but I do not know the place or the time. I forgot to write, read, poetry, birds and children

My regards to Raja, Fares and the girls... Is mother of Fares present?

I was sick and the Iraqi authorities treated me well, but I feel alienated, lonely and disappointed

Send news to Kuwait?

Send news to Nizar Qabbani.. I have largely forgotten poetry.. I am here, but where am I?

I wrote these letters with the help of this Mauritanian woman whose name I cannot mention. Send me the news of everything

I'm Fayeq .. I'm Fayeq .. I'm Fayeq

Is Raja present? Is Fares present?

Is Kuwait still Kuwait or not?

== In popular culture ==
Some of Abdul Jaleel's work was transcribed into plays and musicals, including:

- (Deira Opera.. We stay Kuwaitis) was the first Kuwaiti opera song that expressed Abdul-Jaleel's extreme love for his country it was inspired by poem he wrote during the Iraqi occupation of Kuwait called (We stay Kuwaiti) and it was produced under the patronage of Sheikh Sabah Al-Ahmad Al-Jaber Al- Sabah, the Emir of Kuwait. This opera was produced and presented at the Amiri Diwan by the Martyr's Office in 2015, many years after Abdul-Jaleel was imprisoned and murdered.
- In 2000 musical score was written by Dr. Suleiman Al-Degan in. This music was inspired by the poem titled (Restoring Life), which was a part of the Diwan (Story of My Silence).

== Honoring the poet ==
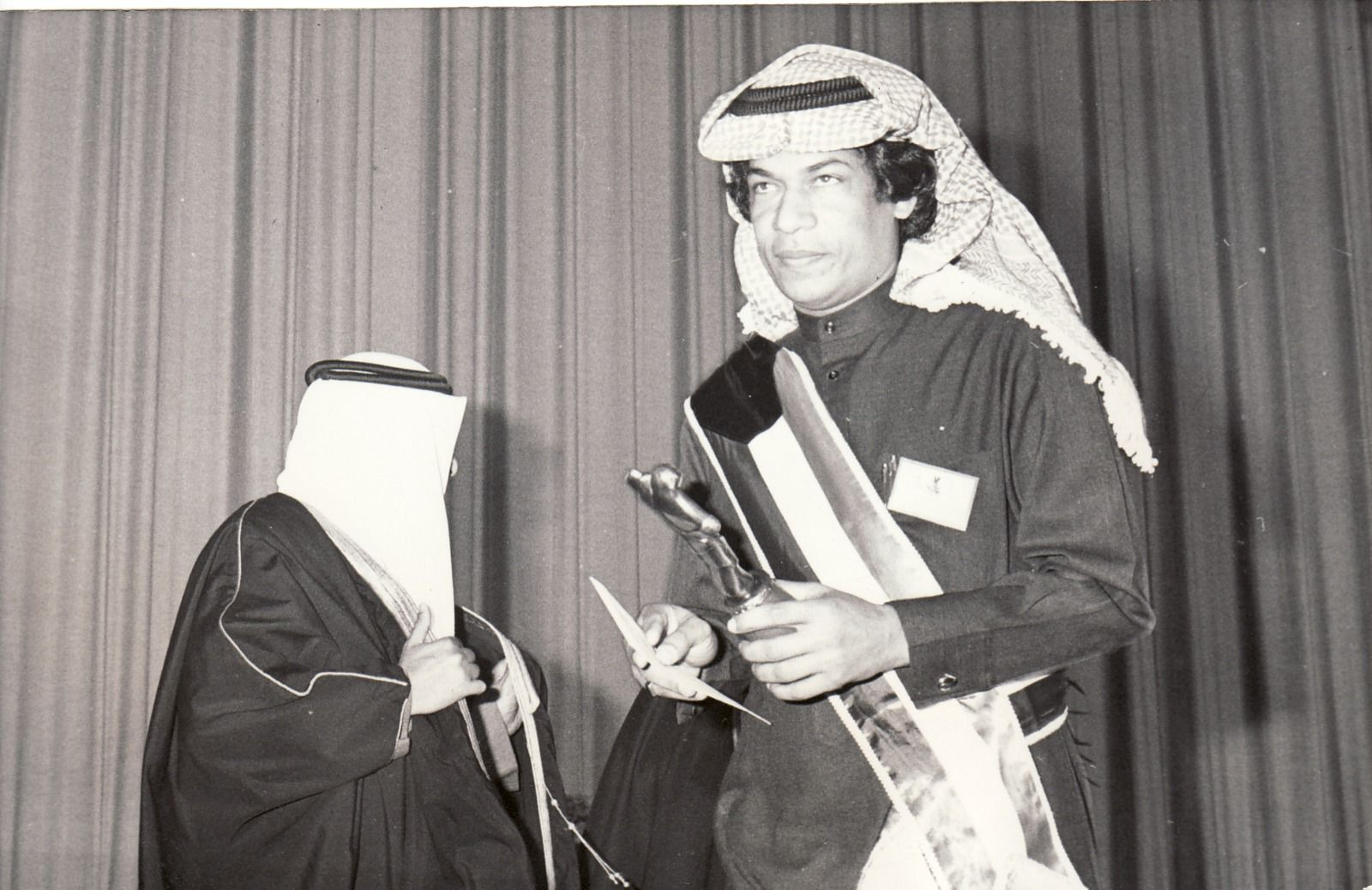
Arab Theater Day in 1977 which honored the poet.

- Honoring on the Arab Theater Day to honor the theater artist - Kuwait in 1977 under the patronage of Sheikh Salem Sabah Al-Salem Al-Sabah.
- Honor from the Kuwaiti Theater Troupe in 2003 - for a course in enriching the Kuwaiti theatrical movement.
- Honor from the National Conference (from Kuwait we start and to Kuwait we finish) - session 10 - 2013.
- Honoring from the 21st Qurain Cultural Festival under the auspices of the National Council for Culture, Arts and Letters - Kuwait 2015.

== Imprisonment and death ==
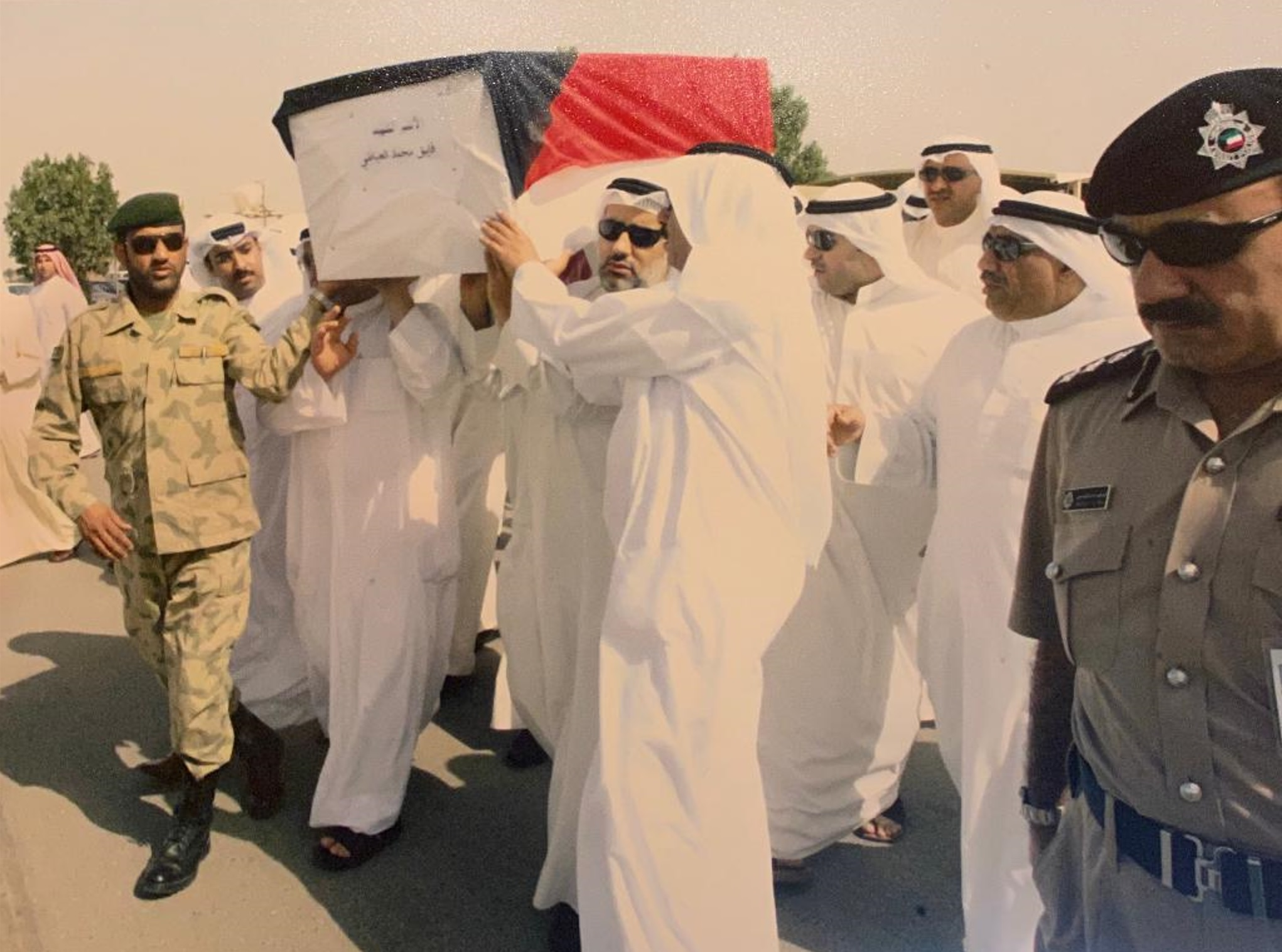
Mourners carrying the remains of Abdul Jaleel during his official funeral on 20 June 2006 where his remains were taken back and buried in Kuwait.

The fate of the Kuwaiti prisoners has never been determined with any precision. The US government now believes they were probably all executed shortly after the end of the Gulf War. But that was not the US position before the 2003 invasion of Iraq; in fact, the return of the prisoners was cited as a secondary reason for launching the invasion in the first place. Throughout the 1990s, the Arab-language media reported occasional sightings of Abdul-Jaleel and other prisoners in one location or another.

His remains were unearthed from a shallow mass grave in the desert near Kerbala in July 2004. He was identified by the intact label inside his traditional Kuwaiti robe, showing the name of his tailor. and by a series of DNA tests. According to his death certificate, issued by the Kuwaiti Health Ministry in June 2006, he had been dead for more than 10 years at the time his remains were discovered. However, the DNA test, conducted by the Interior Ministry and obtained by Abdul-Jaleel's family, suggested the remains were of a man in his early fifties – the age he would have been around the time of the 2003 invasion.

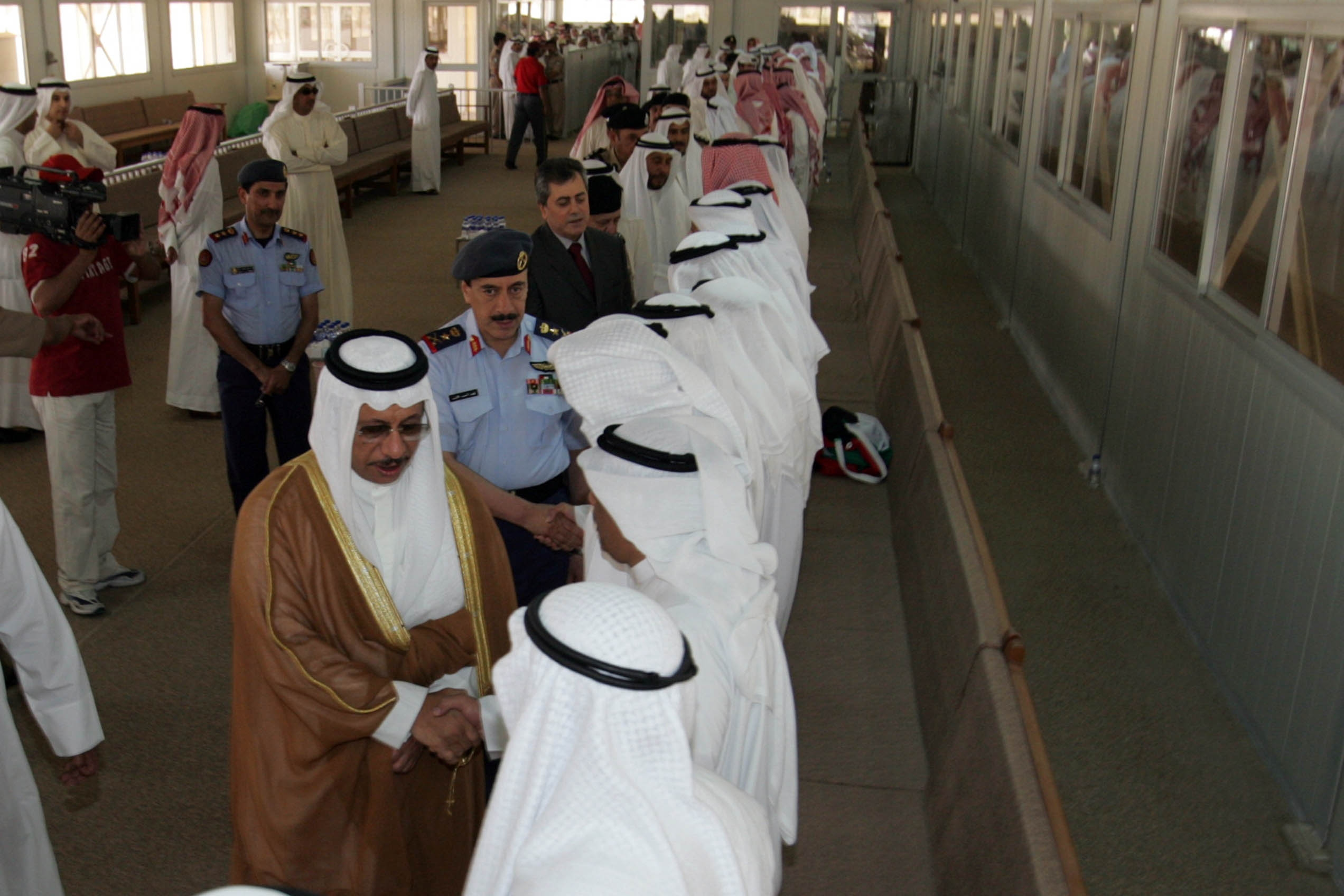
Kuwait government dignitaries and mourners paying respects during the funeral of Abdul Jaleel on 20 June 2006 at the Sulaibikat cemetery in Kuwait.

Abdul-Jaleel's son, Fares Al-Ayadhi, has conducted numerous interviews with people who claim to have seen his father down the years, including an indirect contact with a man who says he was the commander at a prison outside Basra where Al-Ayadhi was held. The younger Al-Ayadhi's information, which has neither been confirmed nor refuted by the Kuwaiti authorities, suggests that Abdul-Jaleel and a number of other prisoners deemed to be of high value to Saddam's government were kept alive for several years.

Al-Ayadhi believes his father was held first in Mosul, then in the Baghdad area and finally in the prison near Basra. According to the man Fares Al-Ayadhi believes to have been his father's last prison commander, he and the other surviving Kuwaiti prisoners of war were sentenced to death shortly before the start of the US invasion in March 2003, driven into the desert and shot.

Abdul-Jaleel's body was brought back to Kuwait where he was buried on June 20, 2006, in Kuwait City's Sulaibikhat Cemetery. The ceremony was attended by the deputy prime minister, defence minister, acting interior minister and several other government dignitaries.

== Poet's eulogy ==
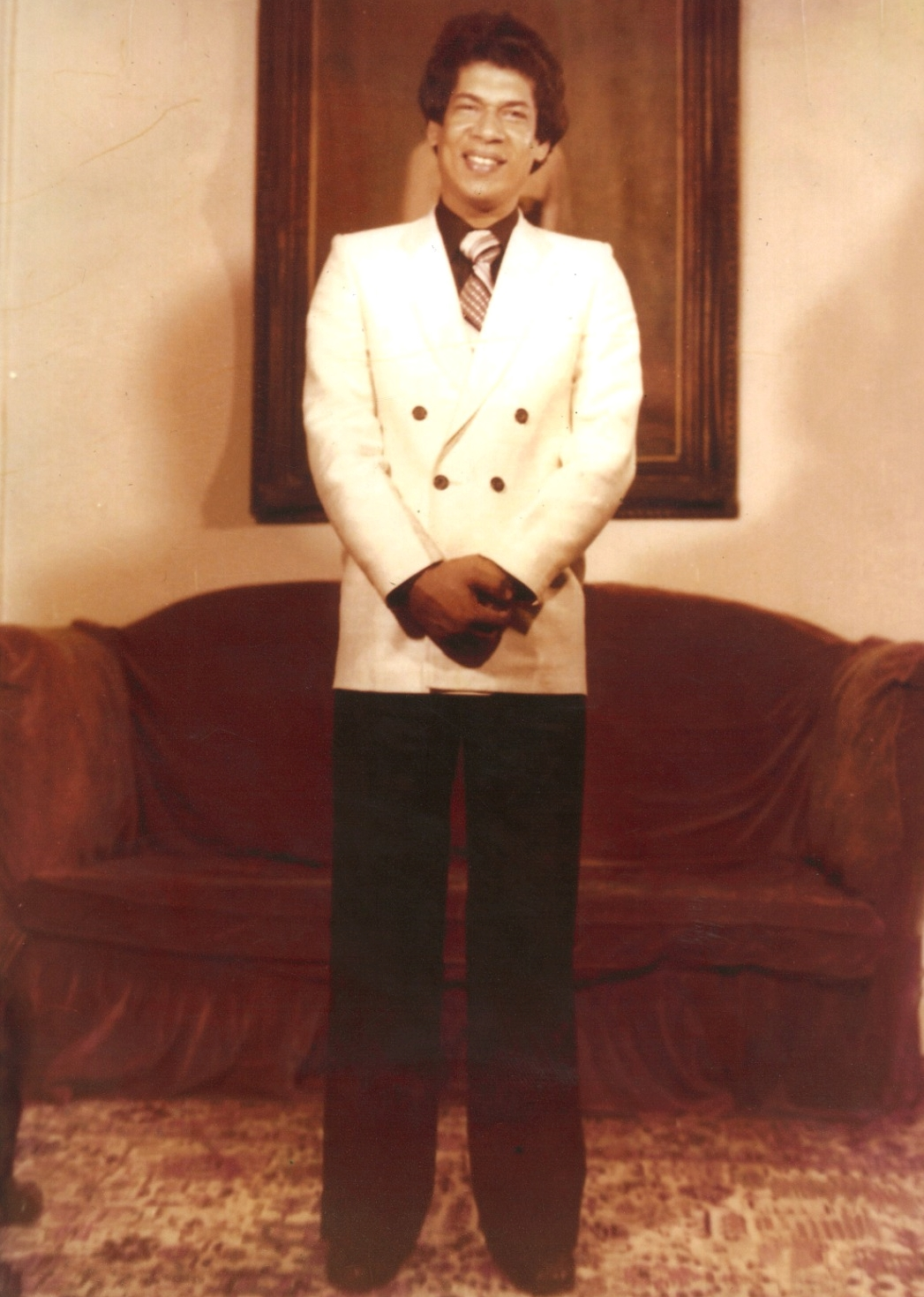
Abdul Jaleel in London in 1977.

On June 20, 2006, Kuwaiti Minister of Information Mohammed Nasser Al-Sanousi officially declared the death of Fayeq Abdul-Jaleel.
