= Nasser Al-Mohammed Al-Sabah =

6th Prime Minister of Kuwait (r. 2006–2011)

His Highness Sheikh Nasser Al-Mohammed Al-Sabah
- الشيخ ناصر المحمد الأحمد الجابر الصباح
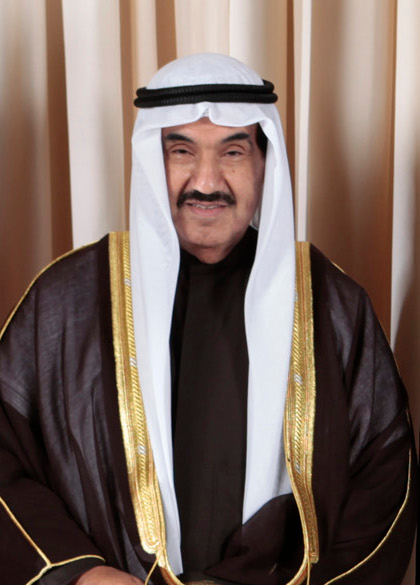
- Al-Sabah in 2009

6th Prime Minister of Kuwait
- In office 7 February 2006 – 28 November 2011
- Monarch: Sabah Al-Ahmad Al-Jaber Al-Sabah
- Deputy: Jaber Al-Mubarak Al-Hamad Al-Sabah
- Preceded by: Sabah Al-Ahmad Al-Jaber Al-Sabah
- Succeeded by: Jaber Al-Mubarak Al-Hamad Al-Sabah

Minister of Amiri Diwan of Kuwait (Head of the Ruler's Court)
- In office 10 September 1990 – 12 February 2006
- Prime Minister: Saad Al-Abdullah; Sabah Al-Ahmad Al-Jaber Al-Sabah
- Preceded by: Khaled Al-Ahmad Al-Jaber Al-Sabah
- Succeeded by: Nasser Sabah Al-Ahmad Al-Sabah

Minister of Social Affairs
- In office 11 January 1988 – 9 March 1990
- Prime Minister: Saad Al-Abdullah Al-Salim Al-Sabah
- Preceded by: Jaber Al-Mubarak Al-Hamad Al-Sabah
- Succeeded by: Jaber Abdullah

Personal details
- Born: 22 December 1940 (age 85) Kuwait City, Sheikhdom of Kuwait
- Children: Sabah; Ahmad
- Parent: Mohammed Ahmad Al-Jaber Al-Sabah
- Education: University of Geneva

Styles of Nasser Al-Mohammed Ahmad Al-Jaber Al-Sabah
- Reference style: His Highness
- Spoken style: Your Highness
- Alternative style: Sheikh

Nasser Al-Mohammed Ahmad Al-Jaber Al-Sabah (Arabic: الشيخ ناصر المحمد الأحمد الجابر الصباح, romanized: ash-Shaykh Nāṣir Muḥammad al-ʾAḥmad al-Jābir aṣ-Ṣabāḥ, born 22 December 1940) is a Kuwaiti politician who served as Prime Minister of Kuwait from 7 February 2006 until resigning on 28 November 2011.

== Early life ==
Sheikh Nasser was born on 22 December 1940 as the son of Mohammed Ahmad Al-Jaber Al-Sabah, the first defense minister of Kuwait. He is a nephew of the former Emir of Kuwait whom he served, Sabah Al-Ahmad Al-Jaber Al-Sabah,and of 3 other Emirs. He attended high school in the United Kingdom and graduated in 1955. Then, he received a higher diploma in the French language in 1960.

== Career ==
Nasser began his career as a third secretary at the foreign ministry in 1964. He became a member of the permanent Kuwaiti delegation at the United Nations in New York in October 1964. He then served as ambassador to Iran and Afghanistan, the minister of information, minister of social affairs and labour, minister of state for foreign affairs and minister of the Emiri Diwan. He became prime minister when Sabah Al Ahmad began to rule Kuwait in February 2006.

Nasser resigned on 4 March 2007 in a move observers believe was aimed at avoiding a no-confidence motion against health minister Ahmad Al-Abdullah Al-Sabah. Ten MPs presented the motion in February over suspected financial and administrative breaches at the ministry. The vote was due to have taken place in parliament on 5 March and Ahmad would have had to step down if legislators had voted against him. He was reappointed as prime minister on 6 March.

On 25 November, the cabinet resigned, and on 17 December the Emir reappointed Nasser as prime minister of the new cabinet. In March 2009, the Kuwaiti Government submitted its resignation to the Emir of Kuwait after Islamist MPs requested a hearing of the P.M. On 9 May, after the election of the new Parliament, the Emir asked Nasser to form the Kuwaiti Government for the sixth consecutive time.

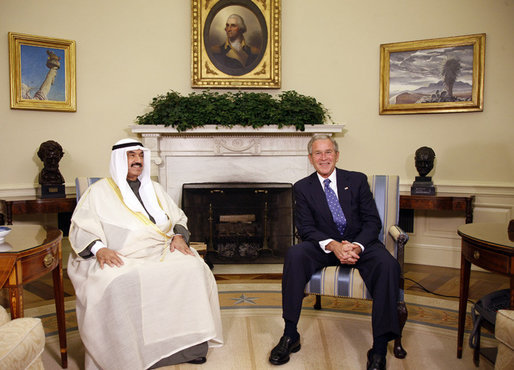
Nasser with U.S. President George W. Bush in 2008

In January 2011, he survived a vote of no-confidence in parliament with a vote of 25–25 (26 were needed to bring down the Government). In April 2011, his cabinet resigned due to a stand-off with parliament; he was reappointed on 6 April 2011 to form a new government, but he resigned again on 28 November 2011. His resignation was accepted by the Emir and who appointed Jaber Al-Mubarak Al-Hamad Al-Sabah as next prime minister on 4 December 2011.

== Personal life ==
He married Shahrazad Al-Humoud Al-Jaber Al-Sabah, with whom he has two children: Sabah and Ahmad

== Controversies ==
=== Dispute with Ahmed Al-Fahad Al-Ahmed Al-Sabah ===
In March 2011, MPs aligned with Nasser Al-Mohammed (Marzouq Al-Ghanim and Adel Al-Saraawi) in Kuwait's National Assembly threatened to interpellate Ahmad Al-Fahad, then deputy prime minister, over misconduct in government contracts, leading to Ahmad's resignation from government in June 2011.

==== Alleged payments to MPs ====
In August 2011, supporters of Ahmad Al-Fahad "discovered" documents that incriminated up to one-third of MPs in what quickly became the largest political corruption scandal in Kuwaiti history. By October 2011, 16 MPs were alleged to have received payments of $350m in return for their support of government policy.

==== Alleged Payments through Ministry of Foreign Affairs ====
Also in October 2011, MP Musallam Al-Barrack, a close associate of Ahmad Al-Fahad, alleged that millions of Kuwaiti dinars had been transferred through Kuwait's Ministry of Foreign Affairs to the overseas bank accounts of the prime minister, Nasser Al-Mohammed. This led to respected Foreign Minister Dr. Mohammed Al-Sabah, the only remaining member of the Al-Salem branch of the Sabah family, to resign in protest. Nasser Al-Mohammed denied the allegations, saying that "all the transfers were in the service of the interests of Kuwait and contained no personal benefit" and was subsequently acquitted by a special judicial tribunal in Kuwait.

==== 'Fake' coup video ====
In December 2013, allies of Ahmad Al-Fahad claimed to possess tapes purportedly showing that Nasser Al-Mohammed and former Parliament Speaker Jassem Al-Kharafi were discussing plans to topple the Kuwaiti government. In April 2014 the Kuwaiti government imposed a total media blackout to ban any reporting or discussion on the issue.

In March 2015, Kuwait's public prosecutor dropped all investigations into the alleged coup plot and Ahmad Al-Fahad read a public apology on Kuwait state television renouncing the coup allegations. Since then, "numerous associates of his have been targeted and detained by the Kuwaiti authorities on various charges," most notably members of the so-called "Fintas Group" that had allegedly been the original circulators of the 'fake' coup video.

=== Public protests and resignation ===
Mass political rallies held in November 2011 led the Emir Sabah Al-Ahmad Al-Jaber Al-Sabah to accept Nasser Al-Mohammed's resignation on 28 November 2011.

== Honors and awards ==
- Order of the Kingdom of Swaziland, First Class, from the King of Swaziland, Mswati III, on 23 July 2009.
- Grand National Order of Merit from the President of France, Nicolas Sarkozy, 16 April 2010.
- The key to the city of Santiago, Republic of Chile, from the mayor of the city, in recognition of his role in strengthening the Chilean-Kuwaiti relations on 26 July 2010.
- Honorary Citizenship of Tirana from the Mayor of Tirana, Republic of Albania, Lulzim Basha, on 26 November 2011.
- Honorary doctorate degree from the University of Rome Tor Vergata in the field of comparative legal systems and international relations on 22 May 2014.
- Sigilum Magnum Medal from the University of Bologna, the highest academic honor, on 23 May 2014.
- Grand Cordon of the Order of the Rising Sun, on 3 November 2025

== See also ==
- House of Al-Sabah
- Ahmad Al-Jaber Al-Sabah
- Military of Kuwait

Political offices
| Preceded by Sabah Al-Ahmad Al-Jaber Al-Sabah | Prime Minister of Kuwait; 2006–2011 | Succeeded by Jaber Al-Mubarak Al-Hamad Al-Sabah |
