= Mohammed Ahmad Al-Jaber Al-Sabah =

Kuwaiti sheikh

1st Minister of Defense
- In office: 1962 – 30 November 1964
- Successor: 2nd Minister of Defense Saad Abdullah Al-Salem Al-Sabah (1964–1978)
- Monarch: Abdullah Al-Salim Al-Sabah
- Born: 1909; Kuwait
- Died: 4 April 1975 (aged 65–66); London, United Kingdom
- Issue: Sheikh Bader; Sheikh Nasser Mohammed Al-Ahmed Al-Sabah
- House: Sabah
- Father: Ahmad Al-Jaber Al-Sabah

Sheikh Mohammed Ahmad Al-Jaber Al-Sabah (1909 – 4 April 1975) (Arabic: الشيخ محمد الأحمد الجابر الصباح, romanized: ash-Shaykh Muḥammad al-ʾAḥmad al-Jābir aṣ-Ṣabāḥ) was the second son of Ahmad Al-Jaber Al-Sabah.

He was the first minister of defense, before the formation of the ministry itself. He was assigned this responsibility when the first council of ministers formed in 1962. He was reassigned to the post after the first elections for the National Assembly of Kuwait and remained in the post until 30 November 1964. The Kuwait Naval Base, formally the Mohammed Al-Ahmad Kuwait Naval Base, was named after him.

== See also ==
- Chief of the General Staff (Kuwait)
- House of Sabah
- List of emirs of Kuwait
- Military of Kuwait
