= Ali Sabah Al-Salem Al-Sabah =

Kuwaiti royal and former defense minister

- علي صباح السالم الصباح

Deputy Prime Minister and Kuwait Minister of Defense
- In office 1991–1994
- Monarch: Jaber Al-Ahmad Al-Sabah
- Prime Minister: Saad Al-Abdullah Al-Salim Al-Sabah
- Preceded by: Nawaf Al-Ahmad Al-Jaber Al-Sabah
- Succeeded by: Ahmad Al-Homoud Al-Sabah

Personal details
- Relations: Salem (brother); Mohammed (brother); Thamer (son)
- Parent: Sabah Al-Salim Al-Sabah (father)

Sheikh Ali Sabah Al-Salem Al-Sabah (Arabic: علي صباح السالم الصباح, 1948 – 13 April 1997) was a senior member of the House of Al-Sabah of Kuwait.

== Biography ==
Ali Al Sabah was the 2nd son of the 12th Ruler and 2nd Emir of Kuwait. He graduated from the RMA Sandhurst in 1970. In 1986 he was appointed governor of Ahmadi Governorate. On April 20, 1991, he was appointed Minister of Defense, and on October 17, 1992, after holding elections for the National Assembly, he was reappointed Minister of Defense. On April 13, 1994, with a cabinet reshuffle, he was appointed Minister of Interior. On September 3, 1996, he was appointed Minister of Social Affairs and Labor, in addition to his work as Minister of the Interior.
