= Ahmad Mansour Al-Ahmad Al-Sabah =

Kuwaiti politician (1969–present)

His Excellency Sheikh Ahmad Mansour Al-Ahmad Al-Sabah

Deputy Prime Minister and Minister of Interior
- In office 28 December 2021 – 17 February 2022
- Prime Minister: Sabah Al-Khalid Al-Sabah
- Preceded by: Thamer Ali Al-Sabah
- Succeeded by: Ahmad Nawaf Al-Ahmad Al-Sabah

Minister of Defence
- In office 17 December 2019 – 14 December 2020
- Prime Minister: Sabah Al-Khalid Al-Sabah
- Preceded by: Nasser Sabah Al-Ahmad Al-Sabah
- Succeeded by: Hamad Jaber Al Sabah

Personal details
- Born: 1969 (age 56–57) Kuwait City, Kuwait
- Parents: Mansour bin Ahmad (father); Shaikha Latifa bint ‘Abdu’llah bin Jabir Al-‘Ali Al-Sabah (killed 1992 in Cairo) (mother)
- Education: University of Kansas; Ali Al-Sabah Military Academy

Ahmad Mansour Al-Ahmad Al-Sabah (Arabic: الشيخ أحمد منصور الأحمد الصباح) (born 1969) is a Kuwaiti politician. He served as Deputy Prime Minister and Minister of Defence from 2019 to 2020.

== Biography ==
- He holds a BA in Supportive Media (Political Science) from the University of Kansas.
- Commissioned in Kuwait armed forces from Kuwait military academy, now known as the Ali-Sabah military academy
- Intelligence and Security Officer.
- Assistant tank company commander.
- Captain in the Directorate of Military Affairs in the Office of the Minister of Defense (1991-2002).
- Director of the Department of Public Affairs in the Office of the Minister of Defense.
- Director of Contracts and External Procurement Department.
- Assistant Undersecretary for External Equipment.
- Assistant Undersecretary for Administrative Affairs.
- Vice Chairman of the Board of Directors of the National Offset Company, representing the Kuwaiti Ministry of Defense.
- Head of the Medical Services Authority.
- Chairman of the Direct Offset Committee (2003-2013).
- Member of the Board of Directors of the Public Authority for Youth and Sports since 2006.
- Chairman of the Board of Directors, Director General of the Public Authority for Youth and Sports (2014).
- He completed many advanced military courses in Kuwait, the UAE and America.
- Member of the Standing Committee for the Celebration of National Holidays.
- In October 2017, he was appointed Undersecretary of the Ministry of Defense.
- On 17 December 2019, the late Emir Sheikh Sabah Al-Ahmad Al-Jaber Al-Sabah issued a decree to form the government, where he was appointed Deputy Prime Minister and Minister of Defense and continued in the position until 14 December 2020.
- On 28 December 2021, Sheikh Mishal Al-Ahmad Al-Jaber Al-Sabah, Crown Prince of the State of Kuwait, issued a decree to form the government, where he was appointed Deputy Prime Minister and Minister of Interior, and continued in the position until 17 February 2022, when he submitted his resignation from the position.

== Family Life ==
Sheikh Ahmed Mansour Al-Sabah is married and has two children:

- Sheikh Mansour Ahmed Al-Mansour Al-Sabah
- Sheikh Abdul Rahman Ahmad Al-Mansour Al-Sabah

== See also ==
- Cabinet of Kuwait
