= Kuwait Naval Base =

American naval base in eastern Kuwait

Mohammed Al-Ahmad Kuwait Naval Base
- Mohammed Al-Ahmad Kuwait Naval Base; Camp Patriot
- Al-Julaia'a, Al Ahmadi District
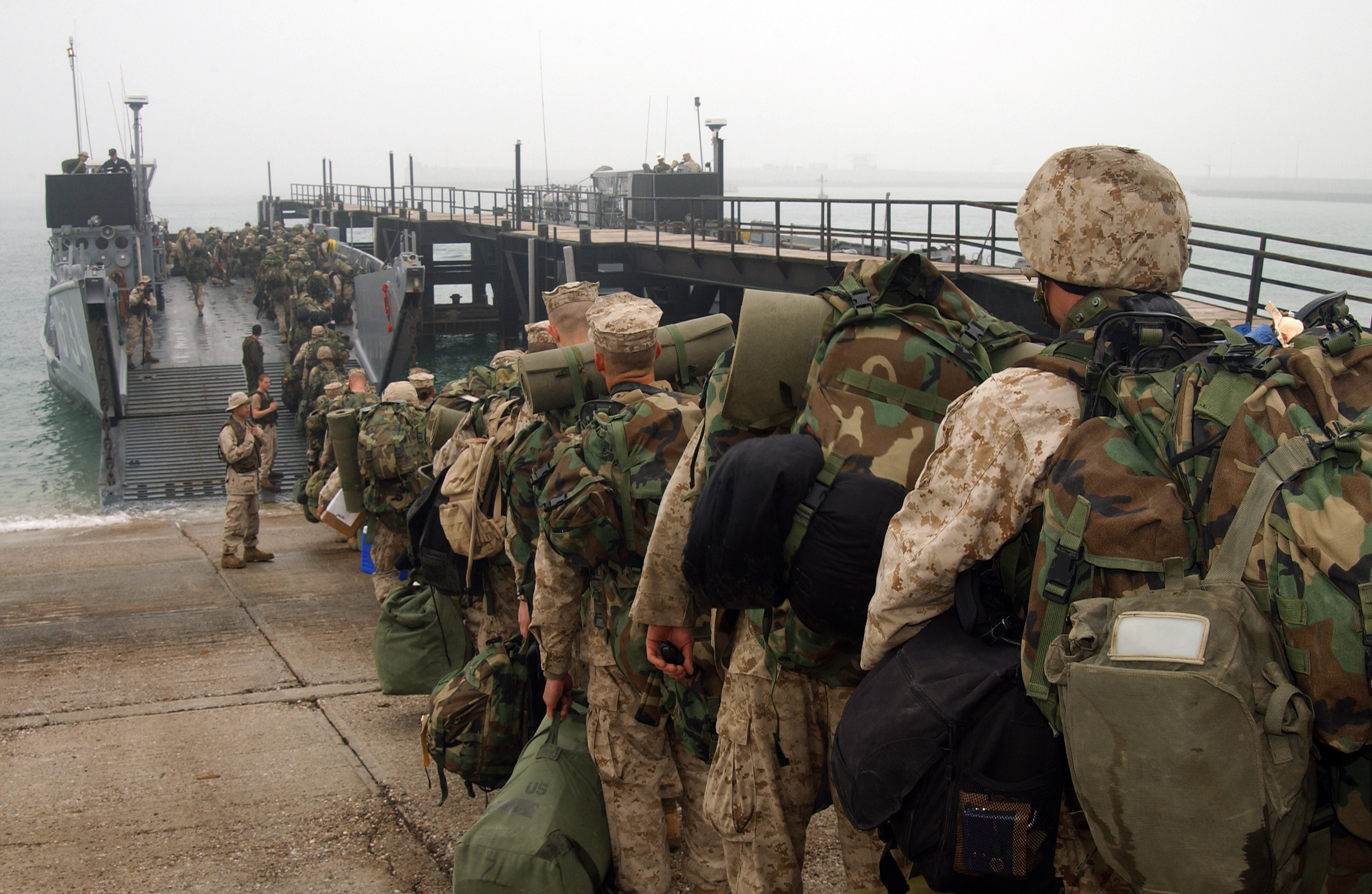
- United States Marine Corps of the 31st Marine Expeditionary Unit load up on a Landing Craft Utility

Site information
- Type: Naval base

Site history
- In use: (2003-)

Mohammed Al-Ahmad Kuwait Naval Base is a Kuwaiti Navy base on the eastern coast of Kuwait. It is named after Mohammed Ahmad Al-Jaber Al-Sabah, the first Defense Minister of Kuwait. The base is also used by the United States Army, Navy and Coast Guard. A main deployment group of the United States Navy, the United States Fifth Fleet using the name Camp Patriot, it is used by the United States military and Kuwait Armed Forces to conduct military operations and training exercises.

The naval base also has a heliport with the ICAO designator OKNB.

== See also ==
- Chief of the General Staff (Kuwait)
- History of the United States Marine Corps
