= Sulaibikhat Cemetery =

Cemetery in Kuwait City, Kuwait

- مقبرة الصليبخات
- Interactive map of Sulaibikhat Cemetery

Details
- Location: Sulaibikhat, Kuwait City
- Country: Kuwait
- Coordinates: 29°18′4.3″N 47°50′20.4″E
- Find a Grave: Sulaibikhat Cemetery

Sulaibikhat Cemetery (Arabic: مقبرة الصليبخات) is the largest cemetery in Kuwait, which has been operating since the 1960s. The cemetery is divided into two parts: the Sunni cemetery, which opened in 1976, and the Ja'fari cemetery, which opened in 1973, so named for its presence in the Sulaibikhat area.

== Notable interments ==
- Abdullah Mubarak Al-Sabah
- Ahmad Al-Jaber Al-Sabah
- Fayeq Abdul-Jaleel, Kuwaiti poet
- Sabah Al-Salim Al-Sabah, 12th Emir of Kuwait
- Jaber Al-Ahmad Al-Sabah, Emir of Kuwait
- Saad Al-Salim Al-Sabah, Emir of Kuwait
- Sabah Al-Ahmad Al-Jaber Al-Sabah, Emir of Kuwait
- Nawaf Al-Ahmed Al-Jaber Al-Sabah, Emir of Kuwait
