= Thamer Ali Sabah Al-Salem Al-Sabah =

Kuwaiti royal and former minister of interior (2020-2021)

Sheikh Thamer Ali Sabah Al-Salem Al-Sabah
- الشيخ ثامر العلي الصباح
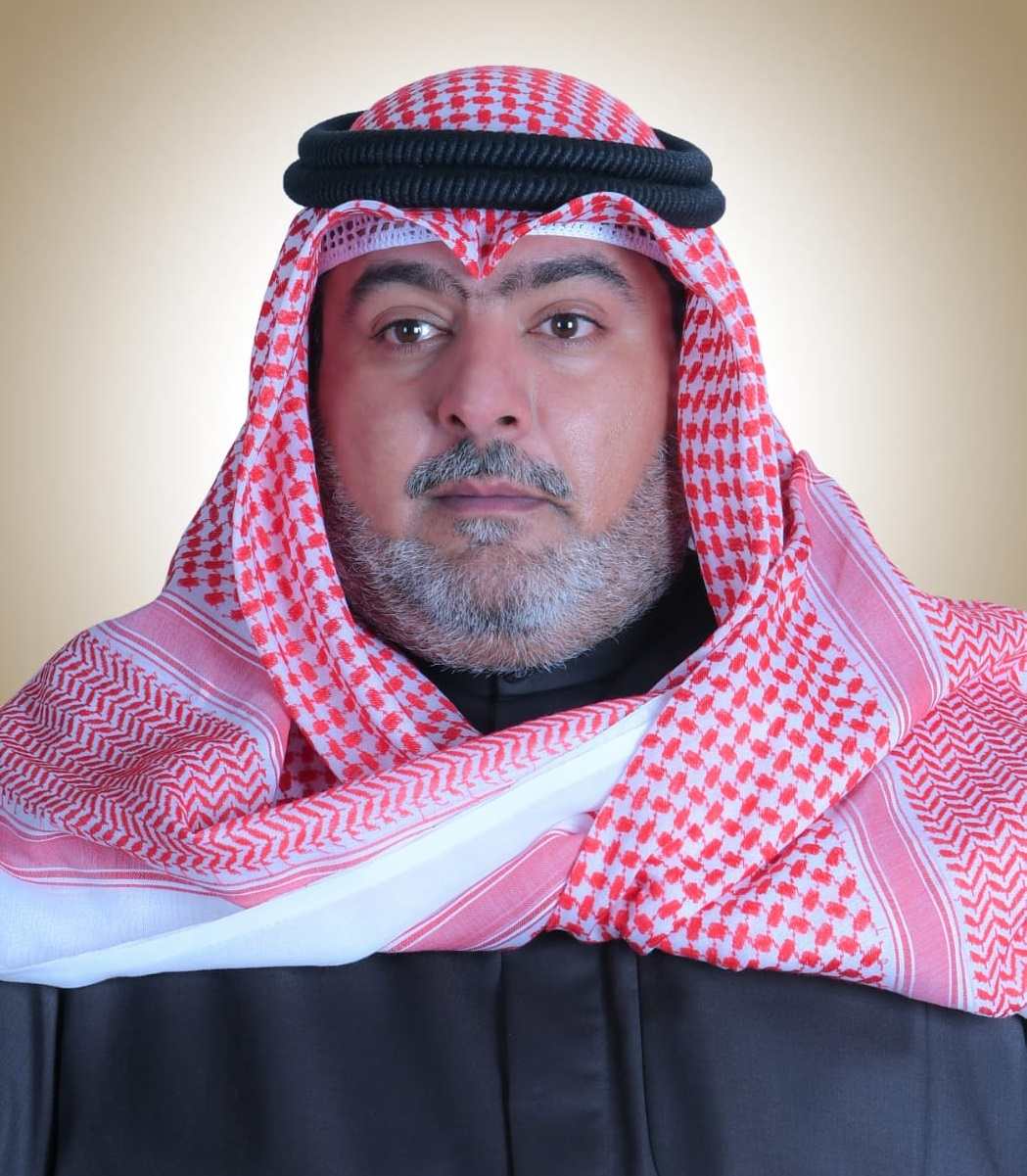

Minister of Interior
- In office 14 December 2020 – 28 December 2021
- Monarch: Nawaf Al-Ahmad
- Prime Minister: Sabah Al-Khalid
- Preceded by: Anas Khalid Al Saleh
- Succeeded by: Ahmad Al-Mansour

Personal details
- Born: 1972 (age 53–54)
- Parent: Ali Sabah Al-Salem

Sheikh Thamer Ali Sabah Al-Salem Al-Sabah (Arabic: الشيخ ثامر علي صباح السالم الصباح; born 1972) is a Kuwaiti politician who served as the minister of interior from 14 December 2020, to 28 December 2021. His father is Sheikh Ali Sabah Al-Salem Al-Sabah, a former minister of defense.

== Education ==
He holds a bachelor's degree in administrative leadership from the University of Arkansas, United States, in 1999, and a Diploma in public administration from the Institute of Business Studies in Kuwait in 1995.

== Career ==
He served as the minister of interior from 14 December 2020, to 28 December 2021. Prior to this, he was the Head of the National Security Bureau from 10 September 2013, until 14 December 2020, and the Deputy Head of the National Security Bureau from 1997 until 10 September 2013. He held the position of Head of the Information and Security Monitoring Sector and the Research and Studies Sector from 2006 until 2013, and he was the Acting Head of the National Security Bureau in 2006. He was the Director of the Office of the Head of the National Security Bureau from 2002 to 2006. He began his career as an employee in the National Security Bureau from 2000 to 2002 and was an Assistant Deputy Manager at Blasim for General Trading and Contracting from 1996 to 2000. Additionally, he is a member of the Advisory Council in NATO.
