= Fariha Al-Ahmad =

Fareha Al-Ahmad Al-Jaber Al-Sabah
- Sheikha
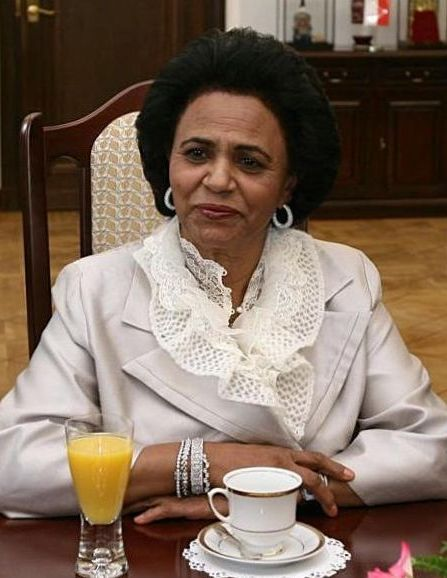
- Born: 15 February 1944; Kuwait City, Sheikhdom of Kuwait
- Died: 12 August 2018 (aged 74); Cairo, Egypt
- Spouse: Sheikh Rashid Al-Hamoud Al-Jaber Al-Sabah
- Issue: Sheikha Reema; Sheikh Hamoud; Sheikha Bibi; Sheikh Ahmed
- House: Sabah
- Father: Ahmad Al-Jaber Al-Sabah
- Mother: Hasina

Sheikha Fariha Al-Ahmad Al-Jaber Al-Sabah (Arabic: فريحة الأحمد) (15 February 1944 – 12 August 2018) was a Kuwaiti royal, one of the daughters of the tenth ruler of Kuwait, Sheikh Ahmad Al-Jaber Al-Sabah. She was born in the Dasman Palace on 15 February 1944. She undertook several charitable activities, heading the "Kuwait Association for the Ideal Family", which created the "Ideal Mother Competition" in 2004 and worked to protect the youth and the disabled. Frayha also encouraged and supported politics that empowered Kuwaiti women.

She received an honorary doctorate from the American College of Greece in 2008. Married to her cousin Sheikh Rashid Al-Hamoud Al-Jaber Al-Sabah (1942–2011), Secretary of the Council of the Ruling Family. They had four children together: Sheikha Reema, Sheikh Hamoud, Sheikha Bibi and Sheikh Ahmed.

She died on 12 August 2018 in Egypt.

== Patronages ==
- Chairman of the Supreme Committee of Ideal Mothers for Special Families (2004).

== Honours ==
- Commander of the National Order of the Cedar (Beirut, 8 November 2007).
