= Kuwait Police =

Kuwait Police شرطة الكويت

Agency overview
- Formed: 1938; 88 years ago

Jurisdictional structure
- Operations jurisdiction: KW
- Governing body: Ministry of Interior (Kuwait)

Operational structure
- Headquarters: Kuwait City

Facilities
- Stations: 62

Website
- www.moi.gov.kw

The Kuwait Police (Arabic: شرطة الكويت) is the national police force of the State of Kuwait. It is an agency of the Ministry of Interior of Kuwait, which maintains the national security envelope, defense of land border, coastal and the rule of law in Kuwait. The Kuwait Police Agency was established in 1938 by Ahmad Al-Jaber Al-Sabah as the Directorate of Public Security Force.

== History ==
=== Directorate of Public Security Force and Directorate of Police (1938-1962) ===
The Kuwait Army split from the Directorate of Public Security Force in 1953; subsequently, the latter merged with Directorate of Police to form Directorate of Public Security and Police in 1959; following the demolition of the defensive wall of Kuwait in 1957; which later formed the Kuwait Ministry of Interior including the Kuwait Police with the enacting of the first cabinet of ministers in the Government of Kuwait on January 17, 1962.

=== Ministry of Interior (1962–present) ===
==== Saad Al-Abdullah Academy for Security Sciences ====
The main college in charge of training Kuwaiti police recruits is the Academy of Saad Al-Abdullah for Security Sciences, established in 1969 and named after the 14th ruler and 4th Emir of Kuwait, Sheikh Saad Al-Abdullah Al-Salim Al-Sabah.

Following the independence of Kuwait in 1961, the Kuwaiti Police department became attached to the newly formed Ministry of Interior in 1962.

From inception, the director of the Kuwait Public Security Force (today's Ministry of Interior) was part of the military due to the incorporation of the Kuwaiti Army part of the Kuwait Public Security Force under the guidance of Sheikh Abdullah Mubarak Al-Sabah.

Following 1961 and depending on the geopolitical environment; Kuwaiti Ministers of Interior; unless very experienced in handling global operations of departmental affairs; have been seconded from the military as well due to the close historical operation cooperation with other constituents of the Military of Kuwait. For instance, Kuwait's fourth Chief of the General Staff of the Kuwait Armed Forces, Lt.Gen.(ret.) Sheikh Jaber Al-Khaled Al-Sabah held the post of Minister of Interior from October 28, 2007 to February 6, 2011.

In 2001, the Kuwaiti Council of Ministers approved the drafting of female police officers; consequently, the first female trainees were admitted to the Saad Al-Abdullah Academy in 2007, with the first group graduating in 2009.

Since 2013, the interior ministry has been headed by Sheikh Mohammad Al Khalid Al Sabah.

The Kuwait Police went on alert as a result of the 2015 military intervention in Yemen by a coalition of forces of Arab countries including Kuwait. The National Guard, Police, the Kuwait Armed Forces and Fire Service Directorate activated defense plans to strengthen internal security measures. Defense measures also included intensifying security around oil installations in Kuwait and abroad.

Students at the Saad Al-Abdullah Academy for Security Sciences typically spend **four years** at the institution if they are pursuing a degree program to become commissioned officers. During these four years, students undergo comprehensive training, both academic and physical, to prepare them for roles in law enforcement, military, or other security services.

The four-year program includes a combination of classroom education, practical training, and physical conditioning. The specific duration and structure of the program may vary depending on the course of study or specialization a student chooses within the academy.

For students who already hold a college degree, the duration of their training at the Saad Al-Abdullah Academy for Security Sciences is typically shorter than the standard four-year program. These students often enroll in specialized or accelerated programs tailored to their prior education and the specific needs of the security forces.

Generally, such programs may last between six months to two years, depending on the individual’s prior education, the specific requirements of the role they are training for, and the branch of the Police they are entering as.

== Sectors of the Ministry of Interior (1962–present) ==
=== Office of the Minister of Interior ===
The office of the minister of interior has at his disposition the command of the various sectors, administrations and departments through the assistance of the office of the undersecretary of the ministry of interior. Ministry of Interior is headed by the Minister.

=== Office of the Undersecretary of the Ministry of Interior ===
The office of the undersecretary ministry of interior is the deputy in charge of handling and tasking operations at all levels in the various sectors and associated general administrations and departments while reporting to the office of the minister of interior. The office is headed by a Lieutenant General of the ministry of interior.

=== Offices of the Assistant Undersecretaries of the Ministry of Interior ===
The offices of the assistant undersecretary of the ministry of interior range between civilian directors and military commanders. Some sectors include also general administrations and departments headed by civilian directors and military commanders and that usually depending on the nature of missions within the sector. Sectors, general administrations and departments of the military and civilian offices of the assistant undersecretaries vary on the environment and include (Special Forces of the Interior, the Coast Guard, Land Border Force of the Interior, Public Security, Counter Drug Force, Traffic Task Force, Interpol Task Force, Criminal Investigations and others)

== Police Stations and Service Centers ==
=== List of Police Stations in Governorates ===
Governorates of Kuwait

Kuwait is divided into six governates. Each governorate is subdivided into several areas. The Ministry of Interior maintains 62 police stations:

Governorate Name	Number of Stations	Note
Jahra Governorate	16	
Capital Governorate	10	
Farwaniya Governorate	10	
Hawalli Governorate	9	
Mubarak Al-Kabeer Governorate	4	
Ahmadi Governorate	13	

=== List of Police Service Centers ===
The Ministry of Interior maintains 48 police service centers:

Governorate Name	Number of Service Centers	Note
Jahra Governorate	4	
Capital Governorate	7	
Farwaniya Governorate	7	
Hawalli Governorate	6	
Mubarak Al-Kabeer Governorate	4	
Ahmadi Governorate	7	
Unattached	13	

== Ranks and Insignia ==
=== List of Police Ranks ===
Rank group	General / flag officers				Senior officers			Junior officers		
Ranks	Crown and Crossed Swords and 2 Stars	Crown and Crossed swords and Star	Crown and Crossed Swords	Crown and 3 Stars	Crown and 2 Stars	Crown and Star	Crown	3 Stars	2 Stars	1 Star
Ranks	فريق أول Fariq 'awal	فريق Fariq	لواء Liwa	عميد Amid	عقيد Aqid	مقدم Muqaddam	رائد Ra'id	نقيب Naqib	ملازم أول Mulazim awwal	ملازم Mulazim

Rank group	Senior NCOs				Junior NCOs	Enlisted	
Ranks	2 Stars on the Side	1 Star on Side	3 Chevron and 1 Rocker	3 Chevron	2 Chevron	1 Chevron	No insignia
Ranks	وكيل أول Wakil 'awal	وكيل Wakil	رقيب أول Raqib 'awal	رقیب Raqib	عريف Earif	جندي أول Jundiun awwal	جندي Jundiun

== See also ==
- Military of Kuwait
- Her Majesty's British Army Rank Officer and Enlisted Corps
- Police ranks of the United Kingdom
