= Salem Sabah Al-Salem Al-Sabah =

Kuwaiti politician (1938–2007)

- سالم صباح السالم الصباح

Deputy Prime Minister and Kuwait Minister of Defense
- In office 1978–1988
- Monarch: Jaber Al-Ahmad Al-Sabah
- Prime Minister: Saad Al-Abdullah Al-Salim Al-Sabah
- Preceded by: Saad Al-Abdullah Al-Salim Al-Sabah
- Succeeded by: Nawaf Al-Ahmad Al-Jaber Al-Sabah

Personal details
- Born: 18 June 1938
- Died: 8 October 2007 (aged 69)
- Relations: Ali (brother); Mohammed (brother)
- Parent: Sabah Al-Salim Al-Sabah (father)

Sheikh Salem Sabah Al-Salem Al-Sabah (Arabic: الشيخ سالم صباح السالم الصباح; 18 June 1938 – 8 October 2007) was a senior member of the House of Al-Sabah of Kuwait.

== Biography ==
Salem Al Sabah was the eldest son of the 12th Ruler and 2nd Emir of Kuwait, Sheikh Sabah Al-Salem Al-Sabah. He served as the Ambassador of Kuwait in the United Kingdom, the United States, Canada and several other European countries from the early 1960s to the mid-1970s. He then served as Kuwait's deputy prime minister and held various cabinet posts, including defence minister, foreign minister, interior minister and social affairs minister. He was also the chairman of the Kuwait's POW and Kidnapped Committee. Even when Salem was seriously sick, his deputies at the committee would visit his home at Messila Palace to give him the latest news regarding the POWs in Iraq.

Salem died at age 69 on 8 October 2007. He was survived by his wife, Badriya, and his four children. His eldest son, Basel, was killed by his uncle in June 2010.
