= Ministry of Defense (Kuwait) =

Government ministry of Kuwait

- Coat of arms of Kuwait

Ministerial Department overview
- Formed: 17 January 1962; 64 years ago
- Preceding Ministerial Department: Kuwait Army Directorate of Public Security Force
- Jurisdiction: Government of Kuwait
- Headquarters: Kuwait City
- Motto: الله والوطن والامير God, Country and The Emir
- Minister responsible: Abdullah Ali Al-Abdullah Al-Salem Al-Sabah
- Child Ministerial Department: Office of the Minister of Defense; Military Office of Chief of General Staff of Kuwait Armed Forces; Office of the Assistant Minister; Offices of the Undersecretaries of the Assistant Minister
- Website: www.mod.gov.kw

The Kuwait Ministry of Defense (Arabic: وزارة الدفاع الكويتية) is one of the governmental bodies of Kuwait. Its minister in charge is a member of the Cabinet of Kuwait. The current Minister of Defense is Abdullah Ali Al-Abdullah Al-Salem Al-Sabah.

== History ==
The Kuwait Army traces its origins to the Border and Security Force, established within the Directorate of Public Security in 1948. The force was renamed the Kuwait Army in 1953, with its security and border units remaining under the command of Sheikh Abdullah Mubarak Al-Sabah. Following Kuwait's independence in 1961, the Ministry of Defense was established on 17 January 1962.

== Minister ==
Name	Portrait	Rank	Tenure	Note
Abdullah Mubarak Al-Sabah		Field Marshal	1949–1961	General Commander of Kuwait Army and the Directorate of Public Security Force (1942–1961) until the two split in 1953. Founder and patron of Kuwait Army and Kuwait Air Force.

== List of ministers of defense (1962–present) ==
The ministry has been headed by the following people since its inception in 1962:

#	Name	Portrait	Title	Tenure	Note
1	Mohammed Ahmad Al-Jaber Al-Sabah		Deputy Prime Minister and Minister of Defense	1962–1964	Mohammed Al-Ahmad Kuwait Naval Base is named after him.
2	Saad Abdullah Al-Salem Al-Sabah		Deputy Prime Minister and Minister of Defense	1964–1978	14th ruler and 4th Emir of Kuwait (2006) The Saad Al-Abdullah Academy for Security Sciences, which trains Kuwaiti police personnel, is named after him.
3	Salem Sabah Al-Salem Al-Sabah		Deputy Prime Minister and Minister of Defense	1978–1988	
4	Nawaf Al-Ahmad Al-Jaber Al-Sabah		Deputy Prime Minister and Minister of Defense	1988–1991	Crown Prince of Kuwait (2006–2020), Emir of Kuwait (2020–2023)
5	Ali Sabah Al-Salem Al-Sabah		Deputy Prime Minister and Minister of Defense	1991–1994	The Ali Al-Sabah Military College, which trains personnel for the Kuwait Armed Forces, is named after him.
6	Ahmad Al-Homoud Al-Sabah		Deputy Prime Minister and Minister of Defense	1994–1996	
7	Salem Sabah Al-Salem Al-Sabah		Deputy Prime Minister and Minister of Defense	1996–2001	
8	Jaber Al-Mubarak Al-Hamad Al-Sabah		Deputy Prime Minister and Minister of Defense	2001–2011	Prime Minister of Kuwait (2011–2019)
9	Ahmad Al-Homoud Al Sabah		Deputy Prime Minister and Minister of Defense	2011	
10	Ahmad Al Khalid Al Sabah		Deputy Prime Minister and Minister of Defense	2012–2013	Retired Lieutenant General and former Chief of the General Staff of the Kuwait Armed Forces (2009–2012)
11	Khaled Al Jarrah Al Sabah		Deputy Prime Minister and Minister of Defense	2013–2016	Retired Lieutenant General and former Chief of the General Staff of the Kuwait Armed Forces (2012–2013)
12	Mohammad Al Khalid Al Sabah		Deputy Prime Minister and Minister of Defense	2016–2017	
13	Nasser Sabah Al-Ahmad Al-Sabah		Deputy Prime Minister and Minister of Defense	2017–2019	
14	Ahmad Mansour Al-Ahmad Al-Sabah		Deputy Prime Minister and Minister of Defense	2019–2020	
15	Hamad Jaber Al-Ali Al-Sabah		Deputy Prime Minister and Minister of Defense	2020–2022	
16	Dr. Ahmad Nasser Al-Mohammad Al-Sabah		Minister of Defense (Acting)	2022	
17	Talal Khaled Al-Ahmad Al-Sabah		Deputy Prime Minister and Minister of Defense	9 March 2022 – 2 October 2022	
18	Abdullah Ali Al-Abdullah Al-Salem Al-Sabah		Minister of Defense	5 October 2022 – 18 June 2023	
19	Ahmed Al-Fahad Al-Ahmed Al-Sabah		Deputy Prime Minister and Minister of Defense	18 June 2023 – 17 January 2024	
20	Fahad Yusuf Al-Sabah		Deputy Prime Minister and Minister of Defense	17 January 2024 – 4 February 2025	
21	Abdullah Ali Al-Abdullah Al-Salem Al-Sabah		Minister of Defense	4 February 2025 – present	

== General functions ==
The major function of the ministry is to implement the government's defense policy and to govern all branches of the Kuwait Armed Forces. It is also responsible for the production, transfer, use, storage, and coordination of mines; and for mine clearance.

The ministry publishes a monthly magazine called Homat Al Watan.
