= Sabah Al-Ahmad Al-Jaber Al-Sabah =

Emir of Kuwait from 2006 to 2020

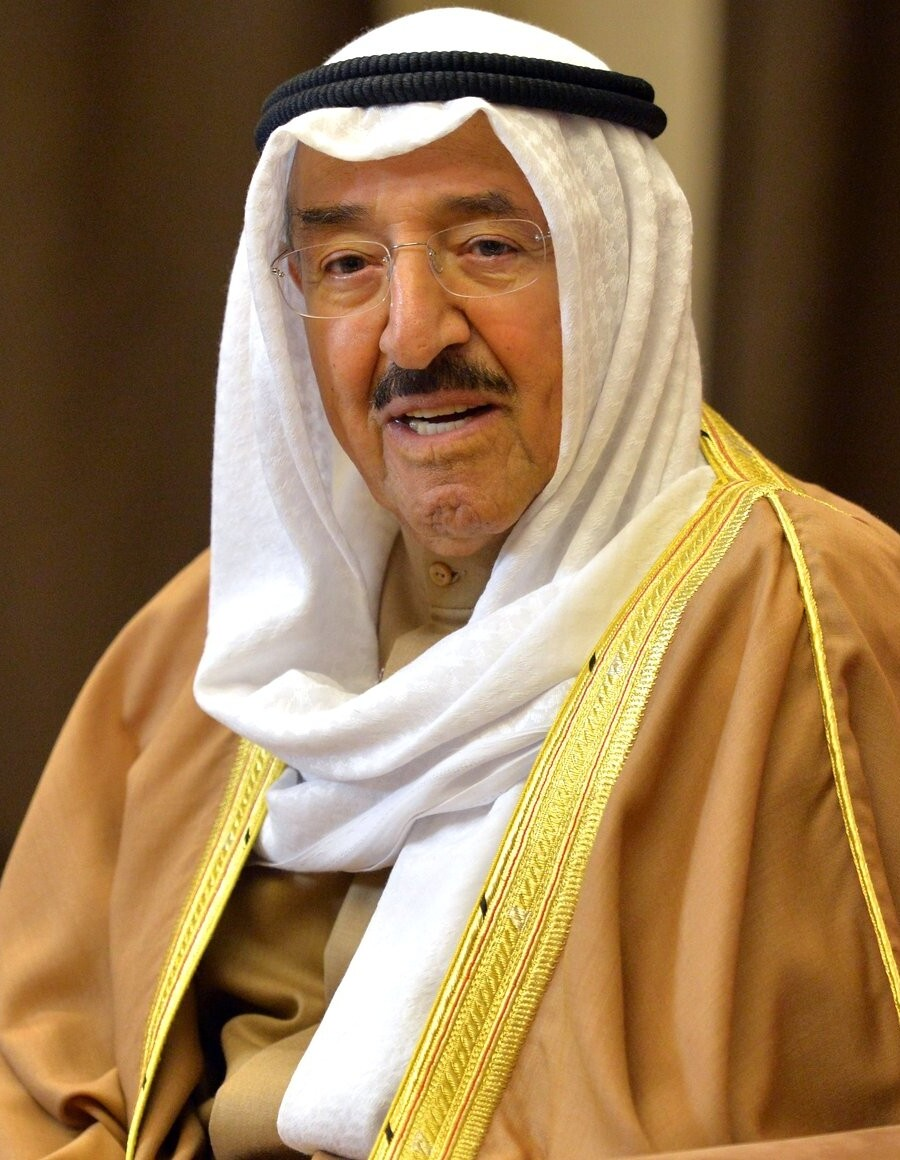
- Al-Sabah in 2015

Emir of Kuwait
- Reign: 24 January 2006 – 29 September 2020
- Predecessor: Saad Al-Salim
- Successor: Nawaf Al-Ahmad Al-Jaber

5th Prime Minister of the State of Kuwait
- In office: 13 July 2003 – 30 January 2006
- Predecessor: Saad Al-Salim
- Successor: Nasser Al-Mohammed Al-Sabah
- Emir: See list: Jaber III Himself
- Born: 16 June 1929; Jahra, Sheikhdom of Kuwait
- Died: 29 September 2020 (aged 91); Rochester, Minnesota, U.S.
- Burial: 30 September 2020; Sulaibikhat Cemetery
- Spouse: Sheikha Fatuwah Salman Al-Sabah (died 1990)
- Issue: Sheikh Nasser; Sheikh Hamad; Sheikh Ahmed; Sheikha Salwa
- House: Sabah
- Father: Ahmad Al-Jaber Al-Sabah
- Mother: Munira Othman Hamad Al-Ayyar Al-Saeed
- Religion: Sunni Islam

Sabah Al-Ahmad Al-Jaber Al-Sabah (Arabic: الشيخ صباح الأحمد الجابر الصباح, romanized: ash-Shaykh Ṣabāḥ al-ʾAḥmad al-Jābir aṣ-Ṣabāḥ; 16 June 1929 – 29 September 2020) was Emir of Kuwait from 24 January 2006 until his death in 2020. He was also prime minister of Kuwait from 2003 to 2006.

He was the fourth son of Sheikh Ahmad Al-Jaber Al-Sabah.

== Early life and early career ==
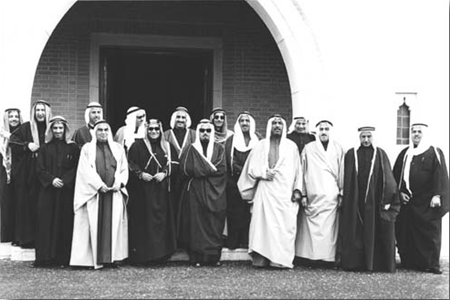
Sixth cabinet in the history of Kuwait in 1967. Sabah is sixth from right.

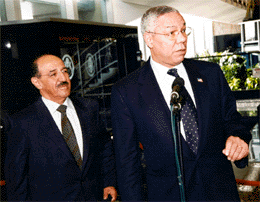
Colin Powell and Foreign Minister Sabah in Washington, 2001

Al-Sabah was born on 16 June 1929. He received his primary education at Al Mubarakya School in the 1930s and completed his education under tutors. He was the half-brother of the previous Emir of Kuwait, Jaber Al-Ahmad Al-Sabah, who appointed Sabah as Prime Minister in July 2003, replacing the Crown Prince of Kuwait, Sheikh Saad Al-Salim Al-Sabah. His cousin was killed when Royal Air Maroc Flight 630 was intentionally crashed by its pilot in 1994. Before becoming Emir of Kuwait, Sabah was the foreign minister from 1963 to 2003, making him the longest-serving foreign minister in the world at the time of leaving office, and the second longest-serving so far. As foreign minister, Sabah restored Kuwaiti international relations after the Gulf War. He was also first deputy prime minister while serving as foreign minister. He was acting minister of finance from 1965 to 1967. He was prime minister and de facto ruler from 2003 to 2006, due to Jaber III's ill health.

== Reign ==
=== Succession ===
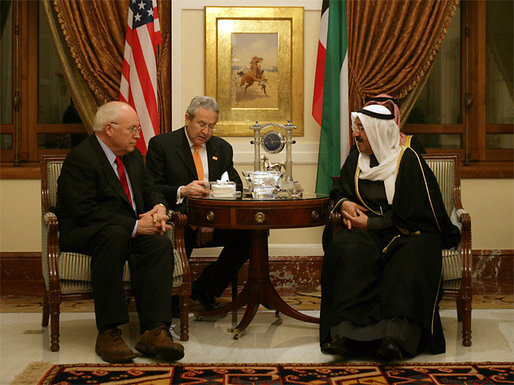
U.S. Vice President Dick Cheney meets with Prime Minister Sabah to deliver condolences on the death of the Emir in 2006

On 15 January 2006, Emir Jaber died, making Sheikh Saad, his Crown Prince and a member of the Salim branch of the ruling family, the new Emir. With Saad's accession, Sabah was likely to become the new Crown Prince, retaining his function of Prime Minister. Saad was ill with a form of dementia, some reports suggested that he suffered from Alzheimer's disease or some other debilitating disease; it was generally agreed that he was unable to speak at any length. As there was concern Saad would not be able to take the constitutionally required oath of office, the Speaker of the National Assembly Jassem Al-Kharafi coordinated with members of the National Assembly on a transfer of power to the Prime Minister, Sheikh Sabah Al-Ahmad.

After a power struggle within the ruling family, Saad agreed to abdicate as Emir of Kuwait on 23 January 2006 due to illness. The ruling family then conferred and Sabah became the new Emir. On 24 January 2006, the National Assembly of Kuwait voted Saad out of office, moments before an official letter of abdication was received. The Cabinet of Kuwait nominated Sabah as Emir. He was sworn in on 29 January 2006 with the National Assembly's approval, ending that crisis.

=== Dissolution of the National Assembly ===
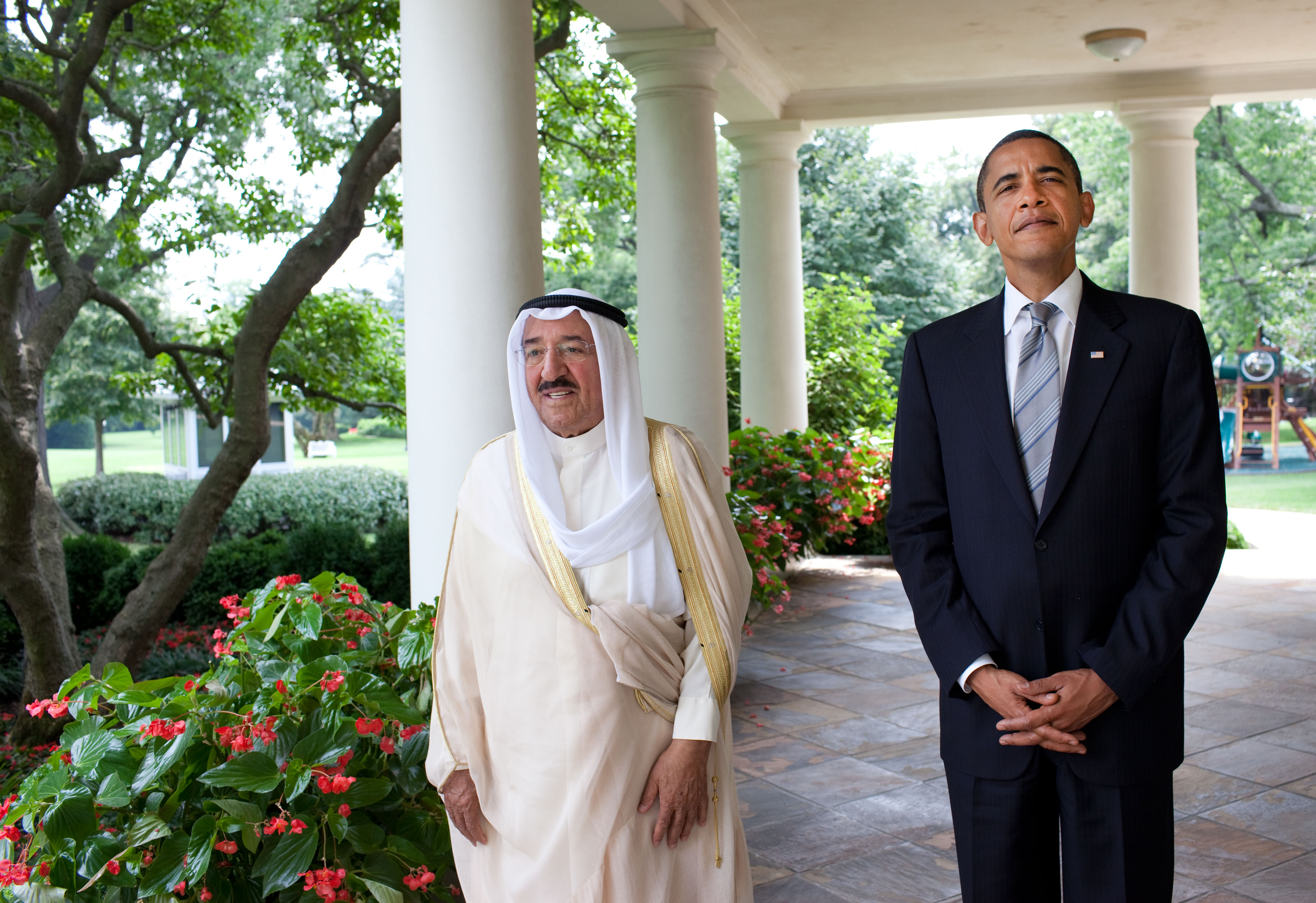
Sabah with U.S. President Barack Obama in 2009

In March 2016, Sabah suspended the National Assembly to keep those in opposition from questioning the Kuwaiti prime minister over the government's actions.

Sabah dissolved the National Assembly on 19 March 2008 and called for early elections on 17 May 2008, after the cabinet resigned in the week of 17 March 2008 following a power struggle with the government.

A struggle broke out between the government and parliament in 2012. He dissolved the parliament.

=== Foreign relations ===
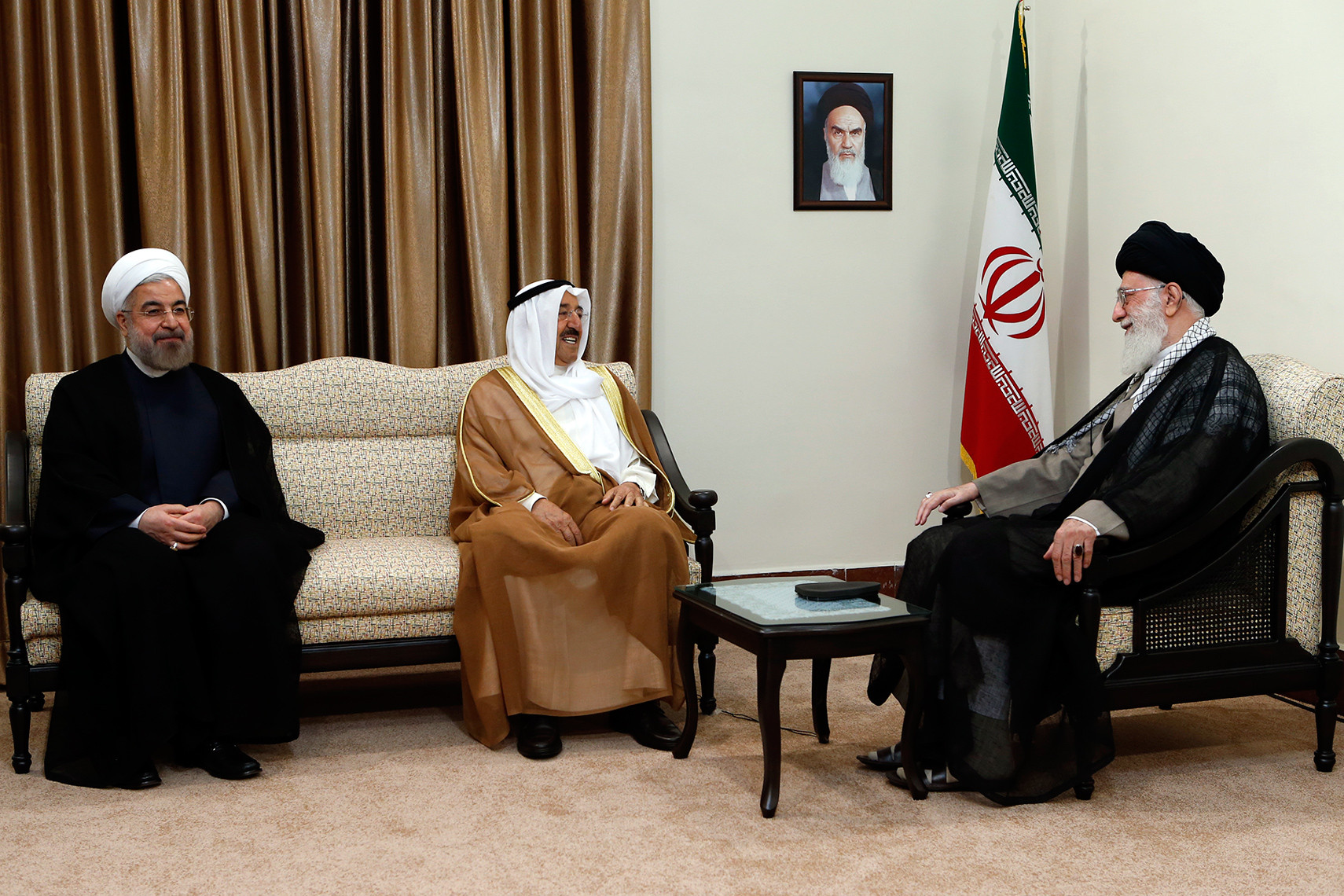
Emir of Kuwait with President Hassan Rouhani and Supreme Leader Ali Khamenei in 2014

Sabah was a regional and international mediator due in part to his place in the Gulf Cooperation Council's leadership order and his 40 years of service as Foreign Minister and Prime Minister. Under his leadership, Kuwait acted as a go-between for Pakistan and Bangladesh, Turkey and Bulgaria, the Palestinian Authority and Jordan, factions in the civil war in Lebanon, and the Gulf States and Iran. In 2016 Sabah hosted several United Nations sponsored meetings of leaders from the warring factions in the Yemeni Civil War.

Sabah established Kuwait as the key mediator in the Qatar diplomatic crisis that began in 2017, meeting with Saudi and Emirati officials before leaving for Doha to discuss the rift with Qatari leaders. His ongoing efforts were publicly supported by Qatar and other interested parties from the region as well as the U.S., UK, France, and Germany. At the beginning of September 2017, Sabah discussed the situation with top officials in Washington, D.C., including U.S. President Donald Trump, who "hailed his efforts" to mediate and "applauded Kuwait's 'critical contributions to regional stability'". There were some questions from the boycotting countries about any preconditions. French President Emmanuel Macron stated French support for Sabah's mediation efforts after a meeting in Paris on 15 September 2017, reiterating statements of support for the initiative. Trump and Sabah had a third meeting at the White House on 5 September 2018.

Sabah is credited with playing a role in the creation of the Movement for the National Liberation of Palestine, or Fatah, in October 1959 in Kuwait City. Several of the early leaders of Fatah, and later the Palestine Liberation Organization, also formed in Kuwait in 1964, were close to Sabah, like Khaled al-Hassan.

Al-Ghanim recalls, The late Emir, Sheikh Sabah Al-Ahmad, refused, on the last days of his life, to attend the normalizing Bahrain Economic Conference, which was held in Manama, despite the enormous pressure he was subjected to from parties that Al-Ghanim didn't name. Sabah in an angry mood called Al-Ghanim and said "Look my son, I am old now and I don't want to meet my Lord having shaken hands with Zionists, and now terrible pressure is being exerted on us." The Emir later asked him calmly to address Kuwait's non-participation from the conference. It's noteworthy that the normalization conference hosted by Manama on 25 May 2019, was considered the economic part of the "Deal of the Century", which included depriving Palestinians of their rights to their land, canceling their right of return, and making Al-Quds the eternal capital of Israel.

=== Humanitarianism ===
Former U.S. President Jimmy Carter called Sabah a "global humanitarian leader", saying, "His support of disaster relief, peace efforts and advancing public health are an inspiration. Other world leaders can learn from the wise example set by my friend, His Highness the Emir."

According to the 2014 Middle East Coutts Report, Sabah provided the largest individual donation in 2013 among GCC members in support of Syrian refugees in neighboring countries, $300 million. In 2014, United Nations Secretary-General Ban Ki-moon cited Sabah as a humanitarian leader globally and presented him with a Humanitarian Award. Ban said, "It gives me great pleasure and honour to be here today to recognize the leadership of His Highness Sheikh Sabah Al Ahmad Al Jaber al Sabah, Emir of Kuwait. This is a great humanitarian day. We are sitting together with a great humanitarian leader of our world". In 2015, Sabah pledged $500 million toward easing the Syrian humanitarian crisis at a UN Summit convened in Kuwait.

In August 2017, UN Secretary-General António Guterres expressed gratitude for Kuwait's leadership in humanitarian action, adding, "But it's not only the humanitarian leadership of Kuwait, it's the wisdom, the dialogue, the promotion of understanding that Kuwait has shown in relation to all conflicts in the region. Kuwait has no agenda. The agenda of Kuwait is peace; is understanding." Guterres further noted the positive role Sabah played in the GCC crisis and recalled that when he was High Commissioner for Refugees (June 2005 to December 2015) Sabah presided over the three conferences to mobilize the international community to support the Syrian people.

=== Jailing of critics, including Members of Parliament ===
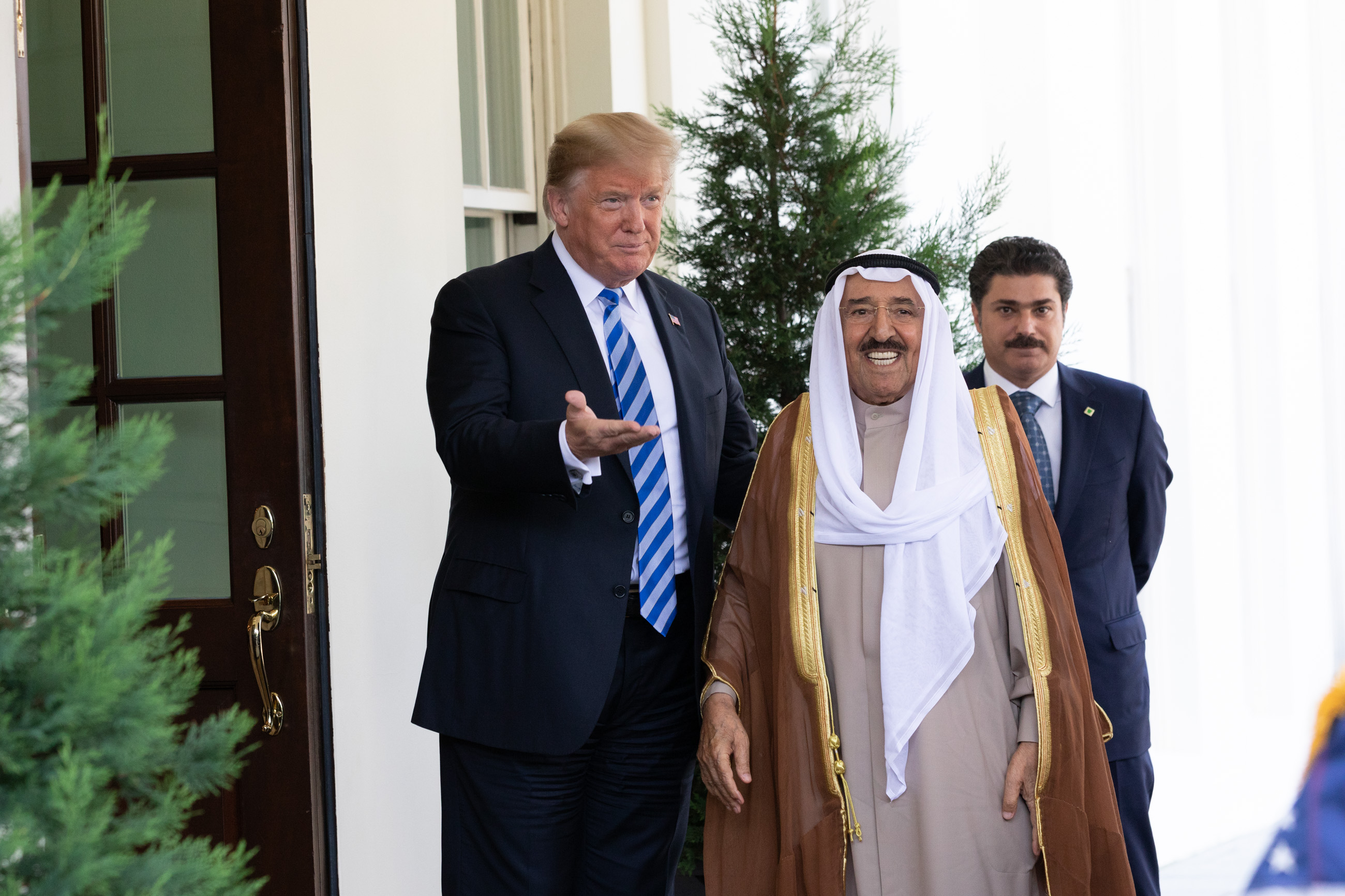
Sabah with U.S. President Donald Trump in 2018

Dozens of protesters in Kuwait were arrested for criticizing Al-Sabah. In 2010, the U.S. State Department said it had concerns about the case of Kuwaiti blogger and journalist Mohammad Abdul-Kader al-Jassem who was on trial for allegedly criticizing the ruling al-Sabah family and accusing Prime Minister Nasser Al-Sabah of mismanagement and corruption, and faced up to 18 years in prison if convicted. He was detained after a complaint against him was issued by the office of Sabah al-Ahmad al-Sabah.

In January 2013, Ayad Al-Hirbi was sentenced to two years in prison for tweeting: "We call on the Kuwaiti government to abide by international agreements it has signed respecting human rights. As a nation, Kuwait must work toward broadening freedoms, not limiting them."

Al-Sabah jailed several members of parliament for criticizing him publicly. In February 2013, a Kuwaiti court sentenced three former MPs to three years in prison with hard labor for insulting Sabah, and sentenced another man to five years in prison for insulting Sabah. At the time, over 300 people were detained in Kuwait on charges of insulting him.

In 2016, a Kuwaiti court sentenced 16 people to two years in prison after they were found re-circulating a 2012 speech by opposition leader Musallam Al-Barrak which criticised Al Sabah. Al-Barrak, a former MP, was sentenced to two years in prison in 2015.

== Death and succession ==
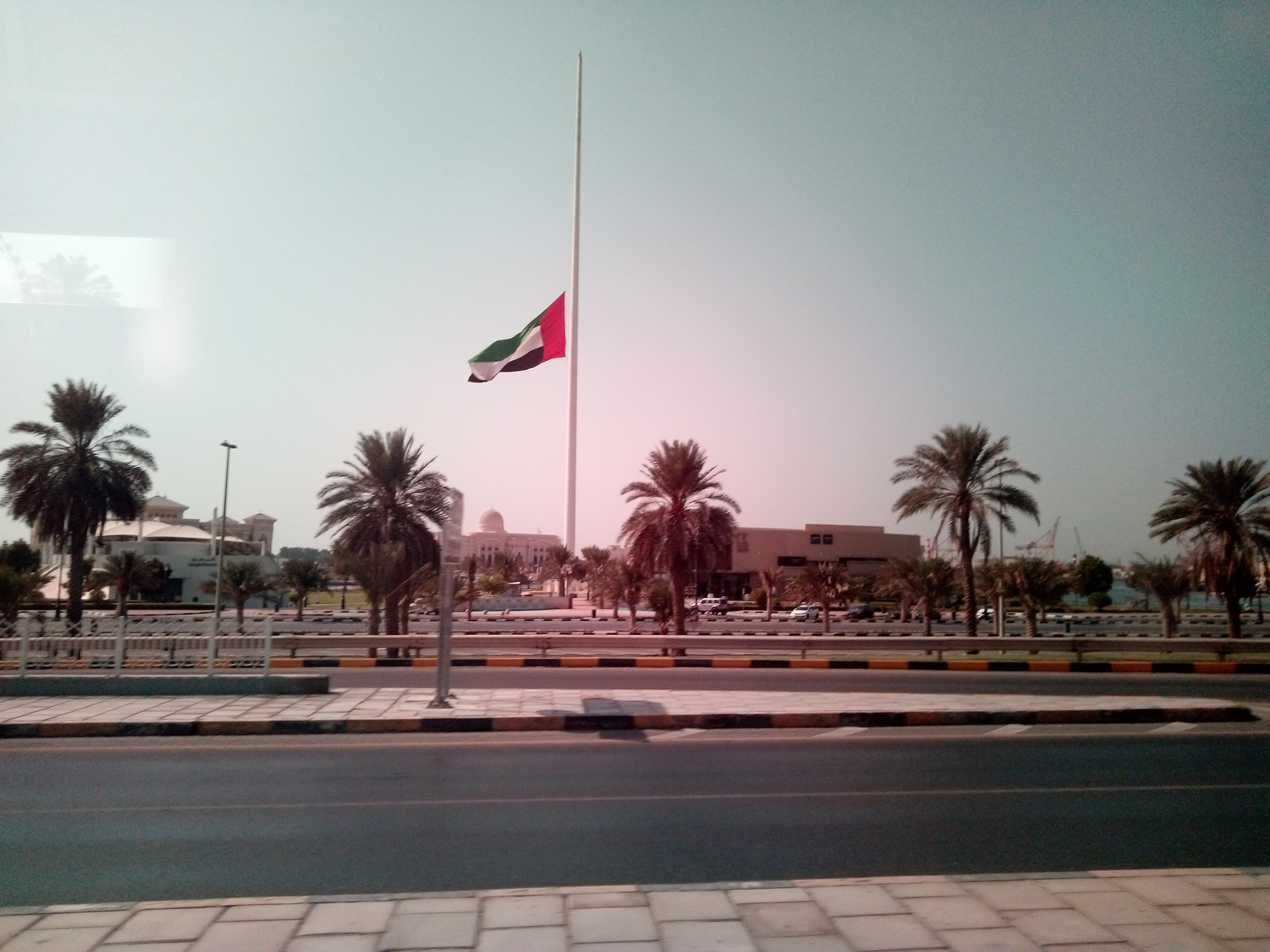
UAE flag at half mast in mourning for Sabah Al Ahmad on 29 September 2020

After months of hospitalization at the Mayo Clinic Hospital in Rochester, Minnesota, Sheikh Sabah died on 29 September 2020 at the age of 91 due to long-term health issues. The Kuwaiti government declared 40 days of mourning. Sabah's half-brother, the crown prince of Kuwait, Sheikh Nawaf, was designated as the new Emir of Kuwait. Sabah was buried on 30 September at Sulaibikhat Cemetery alongside his family.

After Sabah's death, many Arab countries declared mourning periods. Jordan announced forty days of national mourning. Qatar, Bahrain, Oman, Egypt, Libya, United Arab Emirates, Lebanon, State of Palestine and Mauritania all declared three-day mourning periods. Djibouti declared two days of mourning. India, Iraq, Bangladesh and Cuba declared one day of mourning.

A street in Dubai, road axis and bridge in Qatar, those 3 were also renamed in honour of him.

== Honors and awards ==
He received "Order of Mubarak the Great" on 25 June 1978 and Post 1991, he also received Order of Kuwait and Kuwait Liberation Medal.

=== Foreign honours ===
- Albania: Member of the Decoration of Gjergj Kastrioti Skënderbeu (decorated by President of Albania Bamir Topi on 27 May 2012)
- Azerbaijan : Grand Cross with Collar of the Order of Heydar Aliyev (14 June 2009)
- Brunei: Knight of the Royal Order of the Crown of Brunei (18 May 2015)
- Croatia: Grand Cross of the Grand Order of King Tomislav (5 February 2017)
- France: Grand Cross of the Order of the Legion of Honour (30 November 2006)
- Italy: Grand Cross with Collar of the Order of Merit of the Italian Republic (26 April 2010)
- Japan: Knight Grand Cordon with Collar of the Order of the Chrysanthemum (November 2017)
- Mexico: Grand Cross with Collar of the Order of the Aztec Eagle (20 January 2016)
- Oman: Knight Grand Cordon with Collar of the Order of Al-Said (20 February 2017)
- Philippines: Grand Cross with Collar of the Order of Lakandula (23 March 2012)
- South Korea: Grand Cross with Collar of the Order of Mugunghwa (2007)
- Spain: Knight Grand Cordon with Collar of the Order of Civil Merit (23 May 2008)
- Tajikistan: Grand Cross of the Order of Ismoili Somoni (23 June 2013)
- Turkey: Grand Collar of the Order of the State of Republic of Turkey (21 March 2017)
- United Arab Emirates: Grand Collar of the Order of Zayed (13 March 2006)
- United Kingdom: Honorary Knight Grand Cross of the Order of the Bath (27 November 2012)
- Ukraine: Grand Cross with Collar of the Order of Yaroslav Rurik (15 March 2018)
- United States of America: Chief Commander of the Order of the Legion of Merit (17 September 2020)

=== Others awards ===
- Albania: Honorary Citizen of Tirana, Albania (12 April 2008)
- International Organization for Migration: IOM Humanitarian Medal (24 November 2014)
- United Nations: United Nations Humanitarian Leadership (9 September 2014)

== See also ==
- Flag of Kuwait

Sabah Al-Ahmad Al-Jaber Al-Sabah House of Sabah Born: 16 June 1929 Died: 29 September 2020
Regnal titles
Preceded by Saad Al-Salim Al-Sabah	Emir of Kuwait; 2006–2020	Succeeded by Nawaf Al-Ahmad Al-Jaber Al-Sabah
Political offices
Preceded by Saad Al-Salim Al-Sabah	Prime Minister of Kuwait; 13 July 2003 – 29 January 2006	Succeeded by Nasser Mohammed Al-Ahmed Al-Sabah
