= Saad Al-Salim Al-Sabah =

Emir of Kuwait in 2006

Saad Al-Abdullah Al-Salim Al-Sabah سعد العبد الله السالم الصباح
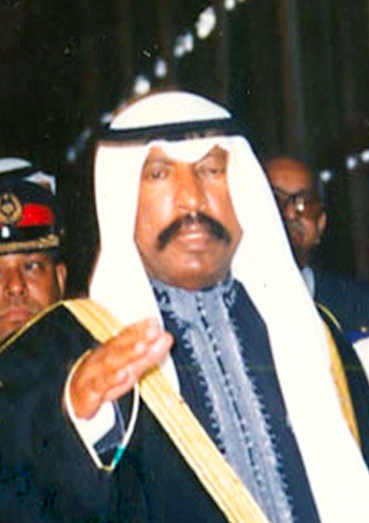
- Al-Sabah in 1991

Emir of Kuwait
- Reign: 15 – 24 January 2006
- Predecessor: Jaber Al-Ahmad Al-Jaber Al-Sabah
- Successor: Sabah IV Al-Ahmad Al-Jaber Al-Sabah

4th Prime Minister of the State of Kuwait
- In office 26 February 1991 – 13 July 2003: 8 February 1978 – 2 August 1990
- Predecessor: Jaber Al-Ahmad Al-Sabah
- Successor: Alaa Hussein Ali (1990); Sabah Al-Ahmad Al-Jaber Al-Sabah (2003)
- Born: 13 May 1930; Kuwait City, Sheikhdom of Kuwait
- Died: 13 May 2008 (aged 78); Kuwait City, Kuwait
- Spouse: Sheikha Latifa bint Fahad Al-Sabah
- House: Sabah
- Father: Sheikh Abdullah Al-Salim Al-Sabah
- Mother: Jameela
- Religion: Sunni Islam

Sheikh Saad Al-Abdullah Al-Salim Al-Sabah (Arabic: سعد العبد الله السالم الصباح, romanized: Saʿad al-ʿAbdullāh as-Sālim as-Sabāh) (13 May 1930 – 13 May 2008) was the Emir of Kuwait from 15 January 2006, succeeding Sheikh Jaber Al-Ahmad Al-Jaber Al-Sabah, until his abdication nine days later on 24 January. He also served as Prime Minister of Kuwait from 1978 to 2003.

Saad was a general commander in the Military of Kuwait; in addition, the first to head the Kuwaiti Ministry of Interior until 16 February 1978 and the first military officer to head the Ministry of Defense since 1964.

== Early life ==
Saad, who was born in 1930, belonged to the Al-Salem branch of the Al-Sabah family and was eldest son of Abdullah Al-Salem Al-Sabah, who ruled Kuwait from 1950 to 1965.

His mother is Ethiopian and he had two younger paternal half-brothers; Sheikh Khalid and Sheikh Ali. His youngest brother Sheikh Ali Abdullah Al-Salem Al-Sabah is a governor. He attended the Mubarakiya school in Kuwait and Hendon Police College in North London.

== Early career ==
Saad debuted his career as the first military officer to head the ministry of interior and ministry of defense in 1962 and 1964, respectively. He served as the general commander of the Directorate of Public Security Force and the Directorate of Police from 1961 to 1962. Following the formation of the 3rd government on 6 December 1964; Saad was appointed both minister of interior and of defense simultaneously and held both posts until 1978. On 16 February 1978, he became Crown Prince and held the post until 13 July 2006.

=== First Gulf War ===
Saad was the leader involved in liberating Kuwait from Saddam's regime. He refused to deal with any of Iraq's ministers attempting to compromise the security of the country during the exile of Jaber Al-Ahmad Al-Jaber Al-Sabah and his declaration of martial law.

== Emir of Kuwait ==
Saad had suffered from colon disease, which led to speculation that he would refuse the Emirship. A declaration in November 2005 refuted such speculation, and Saad took office as Emir on 15 January 2006 upon Jaber's death. However, Saad attended Jaber's funeral in a wheelchair, and his continued health problems caused some to question his ability to rule. Some members of the National Assembly expressed concern that Saad would not be able to deliver the two-line oath of office, scheduled for 24 January 2006.

On 24 January 2006, the National Assembly voted Saad out of office, moments before an official letter of abdication was received. The Kuwait Cabinet nominated Prime Minister Sabah Al-Ahmad Al-Jaber Al-Sabah to take over as Emir.

== Personal life ==
Married to his cousin, Sheikha Latifa Fahad Al-Sabah, Saad had five daughters, Maryam, Hessa, Jamayel, Sheikha and Fadya, and one son, Fahad. One of his daughters, Sheika, controlled international marketing at Kuwait Petroleum Corporation (KPC). Until late August 1998, she was the executive assistant managing director for international marketing at the body. Another daughter, Hessa, was elected as vice president of the Arab-Italian chamber of commerce in October 2012. She is also the head of the Arab women's business council and representative of Kuwait in the Chamber's general assembly session.

== Death and legacy ==
Saad died on 13 May 2008, his 78th birthday, at Shaab Palace in Kuwait City from a heart attack and was buried in Sulaibikhat Cemetery.

The Academy of Saad Al-Abdullah for Security Sciences is named after the former Emir.

== See also ==
- House of Al-Sabah
- Mubarak Abdullah Al-Jaber Al-Sabah
- Fahad Al-Ahmed Al-Jaber Al-Sabah
- Flag of Kuwait

== Sources ==
- Sheikh Saad Abdullah Al-Salem Al-Sabah: The Unforgettable Liberation Hero (1930–2008), Ambassadors Online Magazine, vol. 11, issue 24 July 2008

Saad Al-Salim Al-Sabah House of Sabah Born: 1930 Died: 13 May 2008
Regnal titles
Preceded by Jaber III Al-Ahmad Al-Jaber Al-Sabah	Emir of Kuwait; 2006	Succeeded by Sabah IV Al-Ahmad Al-Jaber Al-Sabah
Political offices
Preceded by Jaber Al-Ahmad Al-Jaber Al-Sabah	Prime Minister of Kuwait; 1978–2003	Succeeded by Sabah Al-Ahmad Al-Jaber Al-Sabah
