= List of companies of Kuwait =

Location of Kuwait

Kuwait is a country in Western Asia. Situated in the northern edge of Eastern Arabia at the tip of the Persian Gulf, it shares borders with Iraq and Saudi Arabia. As of 2016, Kuwait has a population of 4.2 million people; 1.3 million are Kuwaitis and 2.9 million are expatriates. Oil reserves were discovered in 1938. From 1946 to 1982, the country underwent large-scale modernization. In the 1980s, Kuwait experienced a period of geopolitical instability and an economic crisis following the stock market crash. In 1990, Kuwait was invaded by Iraq. The Iraqi occupation came to an end in 1991 after military intervention by coalition forces. At the end of the war, there were extensive efforts to revive the economy and rebuild national infrastructure.

== Notable firms ==
This list includes notable companies with primary headquarters located in the country. The industry and sector follow the Industry Classification Benchmark taxonomy. Organizations which have ceased operations are included and noted as defunct.

Notable companies Status: P=Private, S=State; A=Active, D=Defunct
| Name | Industry | Sector | Headquarters | Founded | Notes | Status | |
|---|---|---|---|---|---|---|---|
| Agility Logistics | Industrials | Delivery services | Sulaibiya | 1979 | Transportation | P | A |
| Alghanim Industries | Conglomerates | - | Kuwait City | 1932 | Media, consumer goods, industrials | P | A |
| Al-Mulla Group | Conglomerates | - | Kuwait City | 1938 | Consumer goods, financials, industrials | P | A |
| Americana Group | Consumer goods | Food products | Kuwait City | 1964 | Integrated food company | P | A |
| Boubyan Bank | Financials | Banks | Kuwait City | 2004 | Islamic bank | P | A |
| Burgan Bank | Financials | Banks | Kuwait City | 1977 | Bank, part of KIPCO | P | A |
| Central Bank of Kuwait | Financials | Banks | Kuwait City | 1969 | Central bank | S | A |
| Fast Telecommunications | Telecommunications | Fixed line telecommunications | Kuwait City | 2001 | ISP | P | A |
| Gulf Bank of Kuwait | Financials | Banks | Kuwait City | 1960 | Bank | P | A |
| Gulfsat | Telecommunications | Mobile telecommunications | Kuwait City | 1995 | Satellite services, part of KIPCO | P | A |
| Industrial Bank of Kuwait | Financials | Banks | Kuwait City | 1973 | Bank | S | A |
| Jazeera Airways | Consumer services | Airlines | Kuwait City | 2004 | Airline | P | A |
| KIPCO (Kuwait Projects Company) | Financials | Real estate holding & development | Kuwait City | 1975 | Holding Company | P | A |
| Kuwait Airways | Consumer services | Airlines | Kuwait City | 1953 | Airline | P | A |
| Kuwait Finance House (KFH) | Financials | Banks | Kuwait City | 1977 | Islamic bank | P | A |
| Kuwait National Petroleum Company | Oil & gas | Exploration & production | Kuwait City | 1960 | Petrochemicals | S | A |
| Kuwait Oil Company | Oil & gas | Exploration & production | Al Ahmadi | 1934 | Oil exploration, part of Kuwait Petroleum Corporation | P | A |
| Kuwait Oxygen And Acetylene Company, subsidiary of Gulf Cryo | Chemical industry | Industrial gases | Kuwait City | 1953 | Chemicals | P | A |
| Kuwait Petroleum Corporation | Oil & gas | Exploration & production | Shuwaikh Port | 1980 | Petroleum | S | A |
| Kuwait Petroleum International | Oil & gas | Exploration & production | Kuwait City | 1983 | Oil & gas | P | A |
| M. A. Kharafi & Sons | Conglomerates | - | Kuwait City | 1956 | Industrials, financials, telecommunications | P | A |
| Maseelah Trading Company | Consumer services | Specialty retailers | Kuwait City | 1972 | Diversified consumer goods | P | A |
| M.H. Alshaya Co. | Conglometrates | - | Kuwait City | 1890 | Retail, reataurants | P | A |
| National Bank of Kuwait | Financials | Banks | Kuwait City | 1952 | Bank | P | A |
| NBK Capital | Financials | Asset managers | Kuwait City | 2005 | Financial Services | P | A |
| Safir Hotels & Resorts | Consumer services | Hotels | ? | ? | Hotels | P | A |
| The Sultan Center | Consumer services | Food retailers & wholesalers | Kuwait City | 1976 | General retail and grocery | P | A |
| Zain | Telecommunications | Mobile telecommunications | Kuwait City | 1983 | Mobile provider | P | A |

Headquarters of Kuwait Petroleum Corporation.

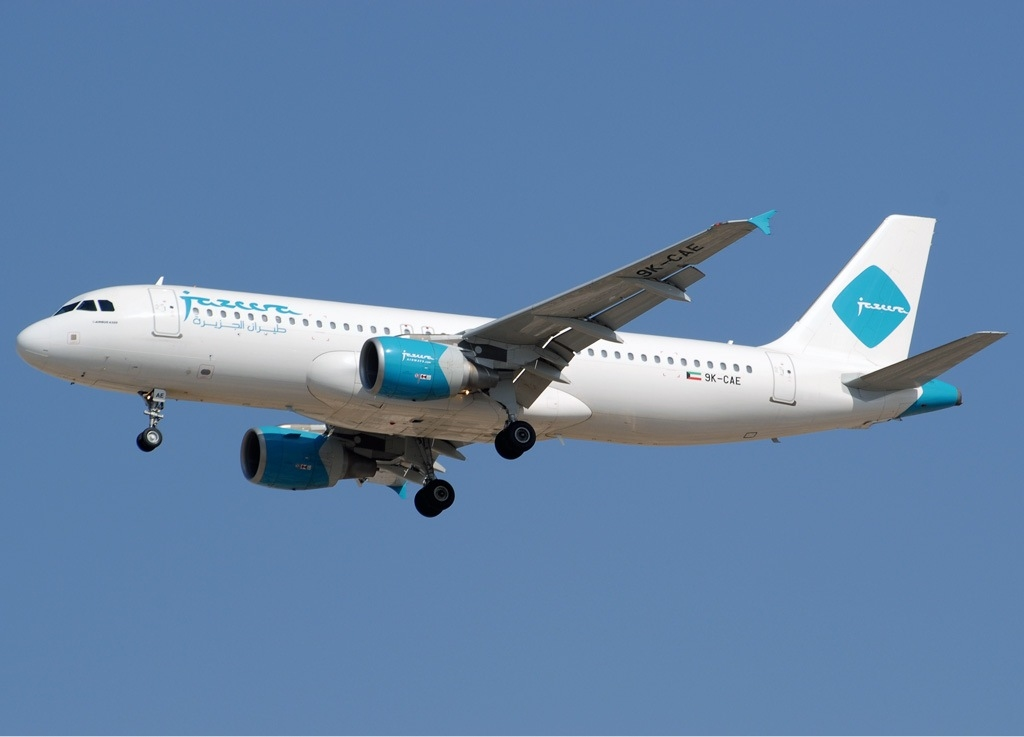
A Jazeera Airways Airbus A320 aircraft in the former livery.

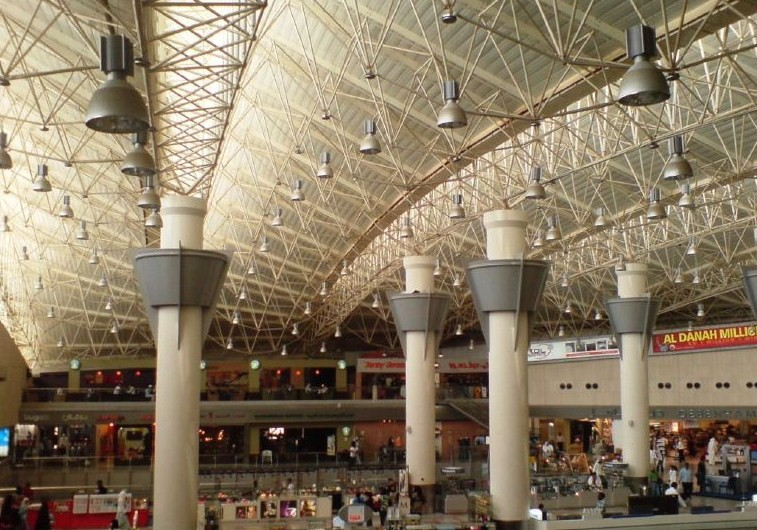
The airport mall at Terminal 1 of Kuwait International Airport.

== See also ==
- List of airlines of Kuwait
