= Jehad Al-Hussain =

Syrian footballer (born 1982)

Jehad Fadhil Al Hussain
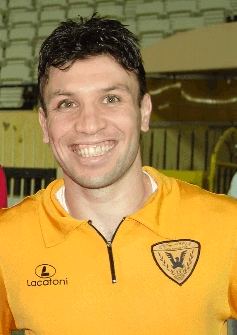
- Jehad Al Hussain in 2010

Personal information
- Date of birth: 30 July 1982 (age 44)
- Place of birth: Homs, Syria
- Height: 1.71 m (5 ft 7 in)
- Position: Attacking midfielder

Senior career*
Years	Team	Apps	(Gls)
2001–2008	Al-Karamah	121	(33)
2006	→ Al-Kuwait (loan)	15	(10)
2008–2009	Al-Kuwait	16	(7)
2009–2011	Al-Qadsia	21	(12)
2011–2013	Najran SC	49	(15)
2013–2014	Dubai CSC	24	(3)
2014–2019	Al-Taawon	128	(16)
2019–2020	Al-Raed	31	(3)
Total		405	(99)

International career
2002–2011	Syria	62	(10)

Managerial career
- 2025–: Syria U23
- * Club domestic league appearances and goals

Jehad Fadhil Al Hussain (Arabic: جِهَاد فَاضِل الْحُسَيْن, born July 30, 1982, in Homs, Syria) is a former Syrian footballer who played as a midfielder. He is now the head coach of the Syria U23 national team.

== Club career ==
=== Al-Karamah SC ===
Al-Hussain was part of the youth academy of Al-Karamah SC which won the Syrian Under-18 premiere league and later on the Syrian Premier League three consecutive times and reached the AFC Champions League final in 2006.

In 2006, he was loaned to Al-Kuwait.

=== Kuwait SC ===
He joined Kuwait SC in Summer 2008 and won the 2009 AFC Cup playing against his old team Al-Karamah SC in the final, sharing the top scorer with 8 goals.

=== Qadsia SC ===
On 24 August 2009, Al Hussain moved to Al-Qadsia in the Kuwaiti Premier League and signed a two-year contract playing alongside his Al-Karamah teammate Firas Al-Khatib both as a duet .

=== Najran SC ===
In September 2011, Al Hussain moved to Najran SC in Saudi Professional League, his debut season in Saudi Professional League was very successful with 9 goals he helped Najran to stay away from relegation, in the second season alongside his national teammate Wael Ayan Najran reached the semi-finals of the Gulf Club Champions Cup 2012–13, both players left Najran SC after months of unpaid Salaries.

=== Dubai CSC ===
In September 2013, he signed for Dubai CSC in the UAE First Division League. He scored 3 goals in one season.

=== Al-Taawon FC ===
In July 2014, he returned to Saudi Professional League with Al-Taawon FC marking himself as The Most Assisting Player in two consecutive seasons 2014–15, 2015–16 and a third time 2017–18.

=== Al-Raed FC ===
Al-Hussain played for Al-Raed before announcing his retirement on 24 October 2020.

== International career ==
Al Hussain has played his international debut for Syria managed by Jalal Talebi in 2002. The last call-up was with Valeriu Tiţa's 23-man final squad for the AFC Asian Cup 2011 in Qatar.

== Coaching career ==
In 2024, Al-Hussain was appointed U-19 coach for his former club Al-Taawoun FC. In October 2025, he became the head coach of the Syria U23 team.

== Career statistics ==
=== Goals for senior national team ===
Scores and results table. Syria's goal tally first:

Goal	Date	Venue	Opponent	Score	Result	Competition
1.	13 October 2004	Abbasiyyin Stadium, Damascus, Syria	Bahrain	2–0	2–2	FIFA World Cup 2006 Qualifying
2.	10 December 2005	Qatar SC Stadium, Doha, Qatar	Iraq	2–2	2–2	West Asian Games 2005
3.	1 March 2006	Chungshan Soccer Stadium, Taipei, Taiwan	Chinese Taipei	2–0	4–0	AFC Asian Cup 2007 Qualifying
4.	18 November 2007	Abbasiyyin Stadium, Damascus, Syria	Indonesia	5–0	7–0	FIFA World Cup 2010 Qualifying
5.	27 January 2008	Zhongshan Sports Center Stadium, Zhongshan, China	China	1–1	1–2	International Friendly
6.	2 June 2008	Abbasiyyin Stadium, Damascus, Syria	Kuwait	1–0	1–0	FIFA World Cup 2010 Qualifying
7.	22 June 2008	Tahnoun bin Mohammed Stadium, Al Ain City, UAE	United Arab Emirates	1–0	3–1	FIFA World Cup 2010 Qualifying
8.	22 June 2008	Tahnoun bin Mohammed Stadium, Al Ain City, UAE	United Arab Emirates	2–0	3–1	FIFA World Cup 2010 Qualifying
9.	28 January 2009	Saida Municipal Stadium, Saida, Lebanon	Lebanon	1–0	2–0	AFC Asian Cup 2011 Qualifying
10.	3 March 2010	Abbasiyyin Stadium, Damascus, Syria	Lebanon	3–0	4–0	AFC Asian Cup 2011 Qualifying

== Honours ==
Al-Karamah

- Syrian Premier League: 2006, 2007, 2008
- Syrian Cup: 2007, 2008,
- Syrian Super Cup: 2008
- AFC Champions League runner-up: 2006

Al-Kuwait

- Kuwait Emir Cup: 2009
- AFC Cup: 2009

Al-Qadsia

- Kuwaiti Premier League: 2010, 2011
- Kuwait Emir Cup: 2010
- Kuwait Super Cup: 2009
- AFC Cup runner-up: 2010

Al-Taawoun

- Kings Cup: 2019

SYRIA

- West Asian Games silver medal: 2005
- Nehru Cup runner-up: 2007, 2009

Individual

- 2009 AFC Cup top scorer
- Saudi Professional League 2014–15 Best Playmaker (9 assists)
- Saudi Professional League 2015–16 Best Playmaker (10 assists)
- Saudi Professional League 2017–18 Best Playmaker (9 assists)
