= Javad Nekounam =

Iranian footballer (born 1980)

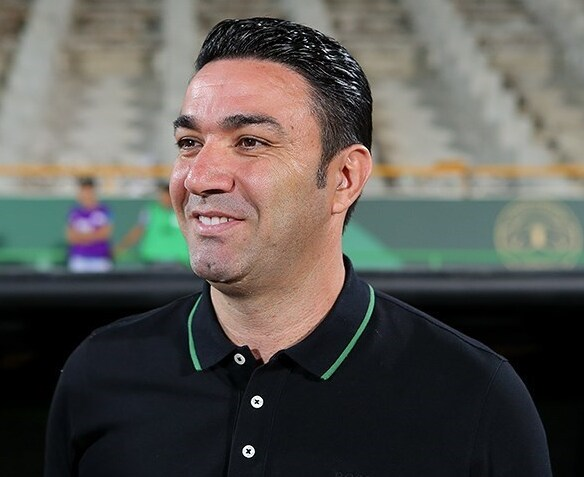
- Nekounam with Esteghlal in 2023

Personal information
- Full name: Javad Nekounam
- Date of birth: 7 September 1980 (age 46)
- Place of birth: Rey, Iran
- Height: 1.86 m (6 ft 1 in)
- Position: Central midfielder

Team information
- Current team: Tractor (manager)

Youth career
- Naft Tehran
- –1998: Pas

Senior career*
| Years | Team | Apps | (Gls) |
| 1998–2005 | Pas | 179 | (45) |
| 2005–2006 | Al-Wahda | 11 | (5) |
| 2006–2012 | Osasuna | 151 | (24) |
| 2012–2014 | Esteghlal | 44 | (8) |
| 2014 | Al-Kuwait | 11 | (1) |
| 2014–2015 | Osasuna | 22 | (5) |
| 2015–2016 | Saipa | 15 | (3) |
| 2016 | Al-Arabi | 11 | (1) |
| Total | | 444 | (92) |

International career
| 1998–2000 | Iran U20 | | |
| 1999–2002 | Iran U23 | 10 | (2) |
| 2000–2015 | Iran (Note: He has two additional caps awarded by the Iranian FA. Those matches are not considered full internationals by FIFA, which only counts 150.) | 150 | (38) |

Managerial career
- 2016: Iran (assistant)
- 2017–2018: Khooneh be Khooneh
- 2018–2019: Nassaji
- 2019–2021: Foolad
- 2021–2023: Foolad
- 2023–2024: Esteghlal
- 2026–: Tractor
Medal record
Representing Iran
AFC Asian Cup
| Bronze medal – third place | 2004 China | Team competition |
Asian Games
| Gold medal – first place | 2002 Busan | Team competition |
- * Club domestic league appearances and goals

Javad Nekounam (Persian: جواد نکونام; born 7 September 1980) is an Iranian football manager and former player who played as a midfielder.

Nicknamed Neku by numerous Iranian football fans, he played as a midfielder, and is also regarded as one of greatest Iranian players of all time as well as of the history of Pas. Nekounam represented the Iran national team of 149 times, playing several major tournaments including two World Cups and four Asian Cups.

== Club career ==
=== Early years ===
Nekounam was born in Ray, Iran. Having played for Pas Tehran F.C. for several years, appearing in the AFC Champions League with the team, he signed a five-month contract with Al-Wahda F.C. in the United Arab Emirates for US$1 million, in 2005.

In January 2006, Nekounam joined Al Sharjah SC, although some European clubs such as 1. FC Kaiserslautern and Tottenham Hotspur had previously shown interest in him.

=== Osasuna ===
After his performance at the 2006 World Cup Nekounam was linked to the likes of Hertha BSC of the Bundesliga and Ligue 1's Olympique Lyonnais, but he eventually joined CA Osasuna on a two-year contract, with an option to a third year and a (about) €5 million minimum release-fee clause. On 22 February 2007, Nekunam finally scored in the 120th minute of the match against FC Girondins de Bordeaux in the knockout stages of the UEFA Cup to help to a 1–0 home win and aggregate score, and after a particularly successful first season began to attract interest from other European sides, notably Scotland's Rangers who had a £1 million pound offer rejected. On 14 August 2007, Nekounam suffered an anterior cruciate ligament rupture in his right knee and, after undergoing a successful surgery in Augsburg, Germany, was sidelined for eight months. His number 24 was given to new signing Jaroslav Plašil, and after some time finally he recovered from his injury. On 31 August 2008, Nekounam scored Osasuna's first goal of the season, from the penalty spot in a 1–1 home draw against Villarreal CF. In November/December he also netted, but the Navarrese failed to win at Málaga CF (4–2 loss) and with Real Valladolid (3–3), also opening the score in the 3–1 away defeat to Real Madrid on 18 January 2009. On 21 May 2011, Nekounam renewed his contract with Osasuna for another two seasons, with the option of an annual renewal of his link.

In July of the following year, amidst interest from Iranian club Esteghlal F.C. and unnamed Turkish and Qatari clubs, it was reported that he would only remain with at the El Sadar Stadium if he accepted a salary reduction – he was the highest-paid player.

=== Esteghlal ===
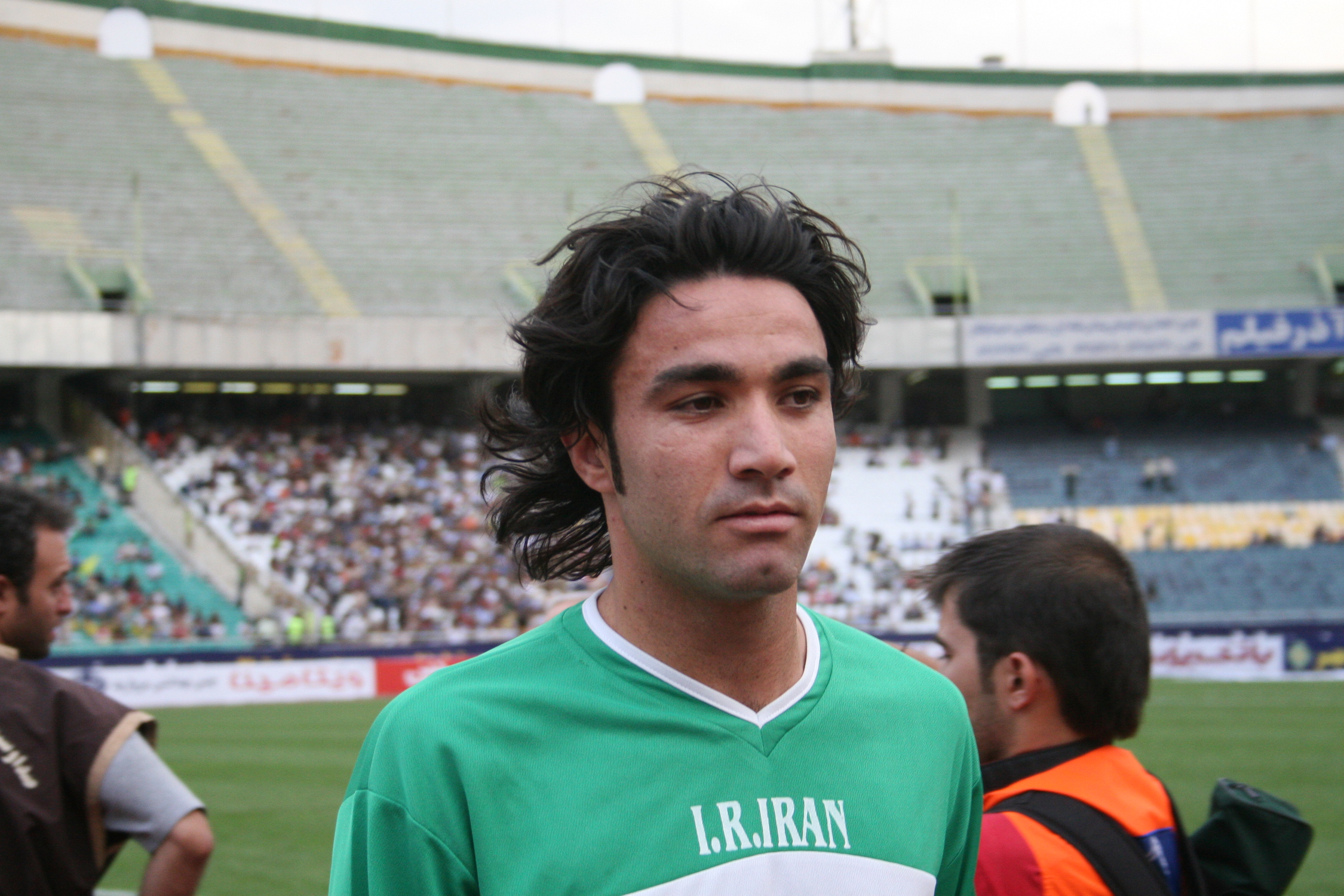
Nekounam with Pas in 2005

On 21 July 2012, aged almost 32, Nekounam returned to his country and signed a two-year deal with Esteghlal for a record fee of US$1,500,000, which made him the most expensive player in the Iran Pro League history. He scored his first goal for his new club in a 3–2 loss to Foolad F.C. on 28 November, through a penalty.

On 5 May 2013, against the same opponent, he also found the net, helping his team secure their 28th league title and winning his second national championship.

=== Al-Kuwait ===
On 14 January 2014, Nekounam agreed to a four-month contract at Kuwait SC. He scored his first goal for the club on 2 February, netting the only in an AFC Champions League qualifier against Al Shorta SC.

Nekounam scored three goals in the 2014 edition of the AFC Cup, and also won the season's Kuwait Emir Cup.

=== Return to Osasuna ===
On 4 August 2014, Nekounam returned to Osasuna by signing a two-year deal. He scored in his first game upon his return, a 3–1 Segunda División loss against Deportivo Alavés on 6 September. On 2 November he added another, helping to a 3–2 home victory over Real Betis.

=== Saipa ===
Nekounam returned to Iran and its Persian Gulf Pro League on 6 July 2015, joining Saipa F.C. for one year. He scored his first competitive goal for his new team on 6 August, the second in a 2–0 win at Rah Ahan Yazdan FC.

=== Al-Arabi ===
On 21 January 2016, Nekounam moved to Qatari club Al-Arabi SC on a four-month contract with an option to extend for a further year. In his first match, at home against Qatar SC, he assisted countryman Ashkan Dejagah in an eventual 1–1 draw.

Nekounam left on 30 June 2016, and the 35-year-old announced his retirement two weeks later.

== International career ==
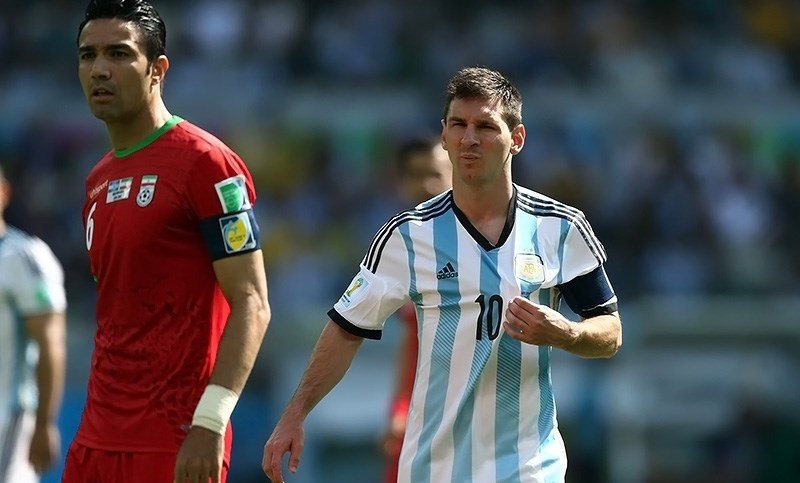
Nekounam playing for Iran against Lionel Messi and Argentina in 2014 World Cup

Nekounam received his first call-up to Iran in 2000. He became a starter for the national side during the 2002 FIFA World Cup qualifiers and, already a key midfield element, played two of the national team's matches during the 2006 World Cup in Germany, being suspended for the final group game against Angola after his second yellow card against Portugal.

Additionally, Nekounam helped Iran win the 2002 Asian Games and the 2004 West Asian Football Federation Championship, and also represented the country in the 2004, 2007 and 2011 AFC Asian Cups. He was Team Melli's leading goalscorer in its successful 2014 World Cup qualifying campaign and, on 1 June 2014, he was selected by Carlos Queiroz for the finals in Brazil, where he captained the nation in an eventual group-stage exit.

Nekounam also made the 2015 Asian Cup squad, in December 2014. In March 2015, he hinted that a friendly against Sweden on the 31st – five days earlier, against Chile, he had become his country's most capped player after surpassing Ali Daei– might be his last international, but later went back on that statement only to confirm it the following day and subsequently send an emotional open letter to fans; he scored 39 goals for his country, and shortly after retiring was named Queiroz's assistant.

== Managerial career ==
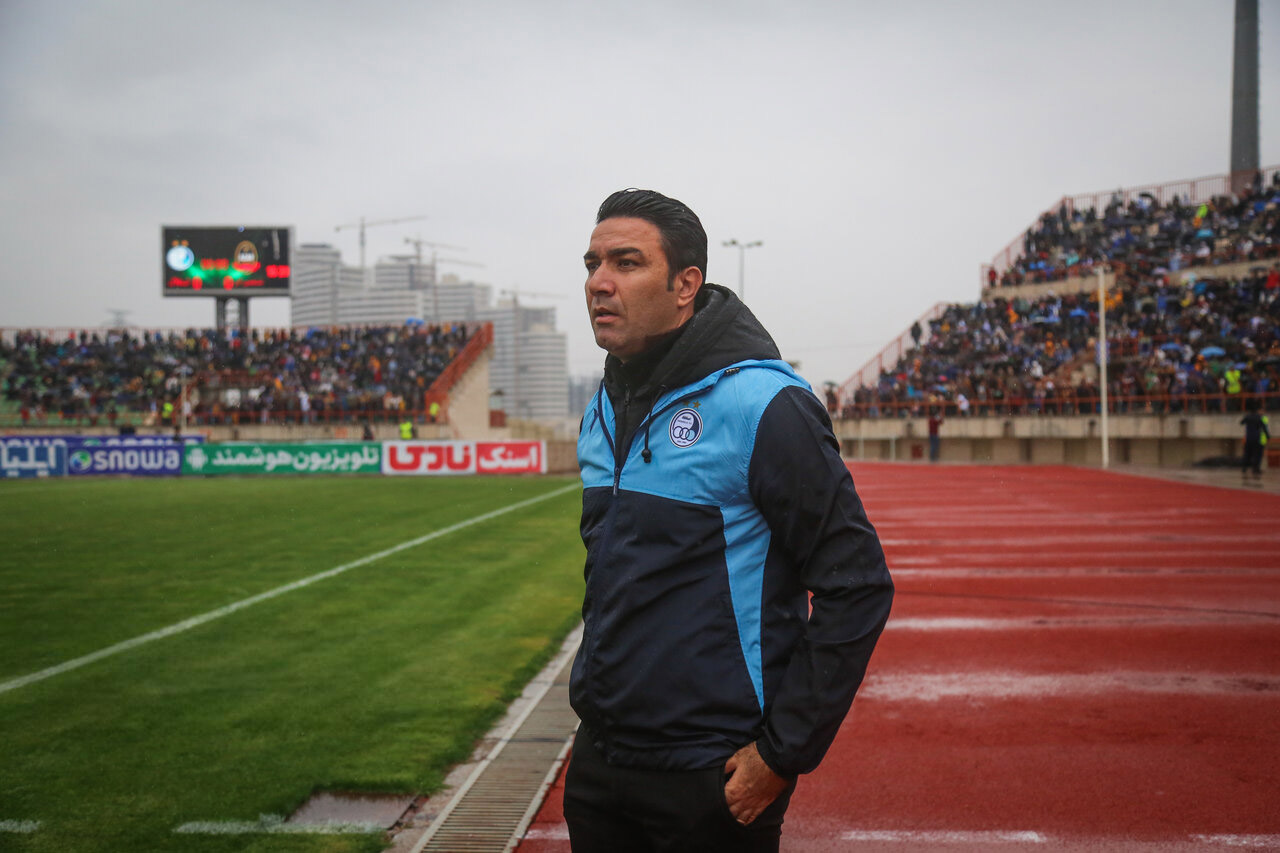
Nekounam coaching Esteghlal Tehran in a Persian Gulf Pro League match.

Midway through the 2017–18 season, Nekounam became the manager of F.C. Nassaji Mazandaran. His team won 23 points from his nine games in charge, and were promoted to the Persian Gulf Pro League after a 24-year absence.

== Career statistics ==
=== Club ===
Appearances and goals by club, season and competition
| Club | Season | League | | | Cup | | Continental | | Total | |
| Club | Season | Division | Apps | Goals | Apps | Goals | Apps | Goals | Apps | Goals |
|---|---|---|---|---|---|---|---|---|---|---|
| Pas | 1998–99 | Azadegan League | 22 | 2 | | | – | | 22 | 2 |
| Pas | 1999–00 | Azadegan League | 24 | 5 | | | – | | 24 | 5 |
| Pas | 2000–01 | Azadegan League | 21 | 5 | | | – | | 21 | 5 |
| Pas | 2001–02 | Iran Pro League | 25 | 4 | | | – | | 25 | 4 |
| Pas | 2002–03 | Iran Pro League | 25 | 7 | | | – | | 25 | 7 |
| Pas | 2003–04 | Iran Pro League | 25 | 10 | | | – | | 25 | 10 |
| Pas | 2004–05 | Iran Pro League | 25 | 9 | | | 8 | 4 | 33 | 13 |
| Pas | 2005–06 | Iran Pro League | 12 | 3 | | | – | | 12 | 3 |
| Pas | Total | | 179 | 45 | | | 8 | 4 | 187 | 49 |
| Al Wahda | 2005–06 | UAE Football League | 11 | 3 | 0 | 0 | – | | 11 | 3 |
| Sharjah FC | 2005–06 | UAE Football League | 11 | 5 | 3 | 3 | – | | 14 | 8 |
| Osasuna | 2006–07 | La Liga | 24 | 2 | 3 | 0 | 12 | 1 | 39 | 3 |
| Osasuna | 2007–08 | La Liga | 2 | 0 | 0 | 0 | – | | 2 | 0 |
| Osasuna | 2008–09 | La Liga | 35 | 8 | 2 | 0 | – | | 37 | 8 |
| Osasuna | 2009–10 | La Liga | 31 | 3 | 2 | 0 | – | | 33 | 3 |
| Osasuna | 2010–11 | La Liga | 26 | 6 | 2 | 0 | – | | 28 | 6 |
| Osasuna | 2011–12 | La Liga | 31 | 5 | 5 | 1 | – | | 36 | 6 |
| Osasuna | Total | | 149 | 24 | 14 | 1 | 12 | 1 | 175 | 26 |
| Esteghlal | 2012–13 | Persian Gulf Cup | 27 | 5 | 4 | 1 | 8 | 3 | 39 | 9 |
| Esteghlal | 2013–14 | Persian Gulf Cup | 17 | 3 | 1 | 0 | 3 | 0 | 21 | 3 |
| Esteghlal | Total | | 44 | 8 | 5 | 1 | 11 | 3 | 60 | 12 |
| Kuwait SC | 2013–14 | Kuwaiti Premier League | 11 | 1 | 2 | 1 | 6 | 3 | 19 | 5 |
| Osasuna | 2014–15 | Segunda División | 22 | 5 | 1 | 0 | – | | 23 | 5 |
| Saipa | 2015–16 | Persian Gulf Pro League | 15 | 3 | 3 | 0 | – | | 18 | 3 |
| Al-Arabi | 2015–16 | Qatar Stars League | 11 | 1 | 1 | 0 | – | | 12 | 1 |
| Career total | | | 453 | 95 | 29 | 6 | 37 | 11 | 519 | 112 |

=== International ===
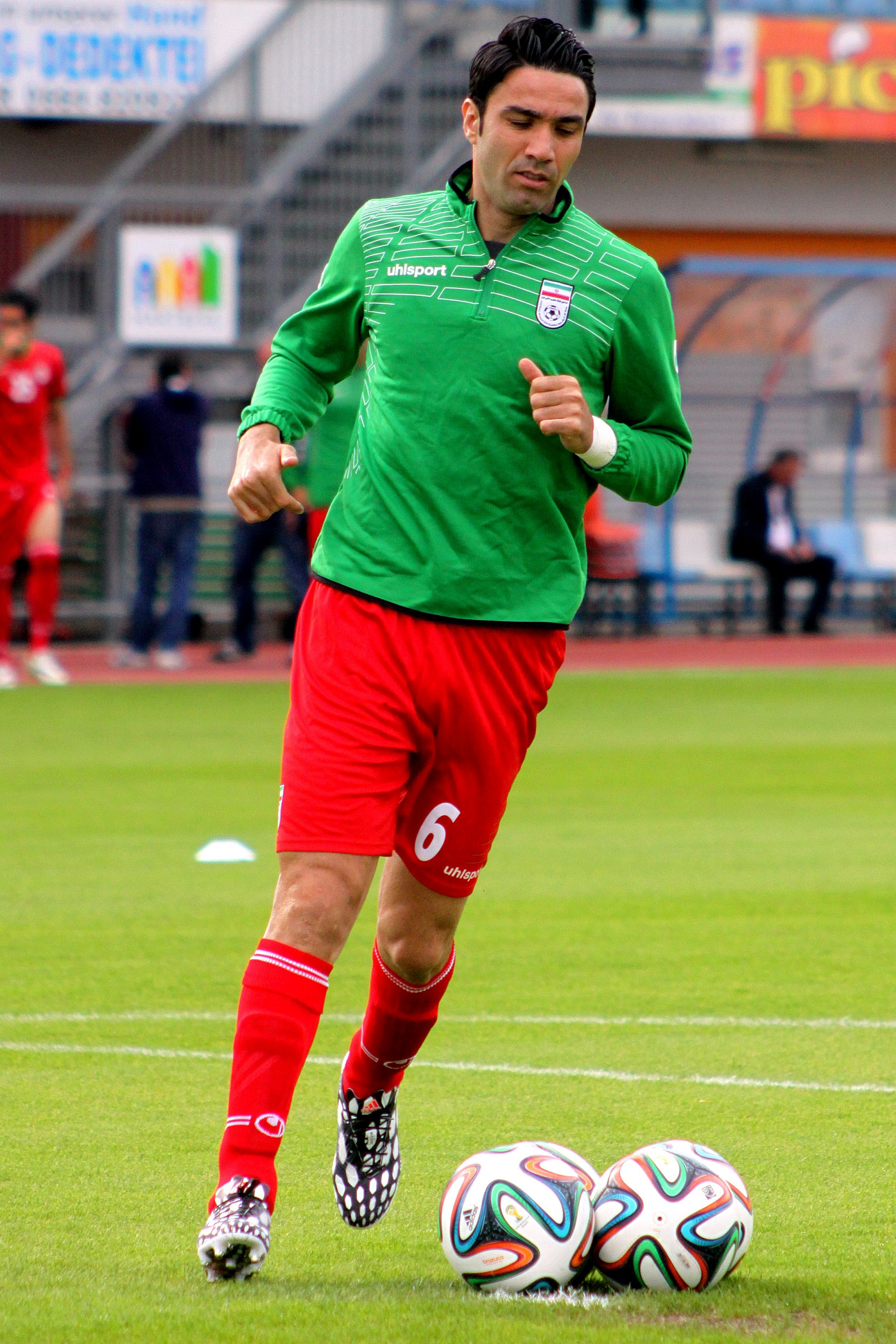
Nekounam before a friendly with Montenegro in 2014

Appearances and goals by national team and year
| National team | Year | Apps | Goals |
|---|---|---|---|
| Iran | 2000 | 6 | 0 |
| Iran | 2001 | 11 | 0 |
| Iran | 2002 | 9 | 0 |
| Iran | 2003 | 10 | 0 |
| Iran | 2004 | 18 | 7 |
| Iran | 2005 | 12 | 4 |
| Iran | 2006 | 11 | 2 |
| Iran | 2007 | 8 | 4 |
| Iran | 2008 | 8 | 4 |
| Iran | 2009 | 8 | 2 |
| Iran | 2010 | 6 | 1 |
| Iran | 2011 | 10 | 5 |
| Iran | 2012 | 9 | 1 |
| Iran | 2013 | 8 | 6 |
| Iran | 2014 | 9 | 0 |
| Iran | 2015 | 7 | 2 |
| Total | | 150 | 38 |

Scores and results list Iran's goal tally first, score column indicates score after each Nekounam goal.

List of international goals scored by Javad Nekounam
| No. | Date | Venue | Opponent | Score | Result | Competition | Ref. |
|---|---|---|---|---|---|---|---|
| * | 1 February 2003 | Hong Kong Stadium, Hong Kong, China | Denmark | 1–0 | 1–0 | 2003 Carlsberg Cup | |
| 1 | 17 June 2004 | Azadi, Tehran, Iran | Lebanon | 3–0 | 4–0 | 2004 WAFF Championship | |
| 2 | 23 June 2004 | Azadi, Tehran, Iran | Iraq | 1–0 | 2–1 | 2004 WAFF Championship | |
| 3 | 25 June 2004 | Azadi, Tehran, Iran | Syria | 4–1 | 4–1 | 2004 WAFF Championship | |
| 4 | 20 July 2004 | Olympic Sports Center, Chongqing, China | Thailand | 2–0 | 3–0 | 2004 AFC Asian Cup | |
| 5 | 6 August 2004 | Workers Stadium, Beijing, China | Bahrain | 1–0 | 4–2 | 2004 AFC Asian Cup | |
| 6 | 17 November 2004 | Azadi, Tehran, Iran | Laos | 5–0 | 7–0 | 2006 World Cup qualification | |
| 7 | 17 November 2004 | Azadi, Tehran, Iran | Laos | 7–0 | 7–0 | 2006 World Cup qualification | |
| 8 | 30 March 2005 | Kim Il-sung, Pyongyang, North Korea | North Korea | 2–0 | 2–0 | 2006 World Cup qualification | |
| 9 | 29 May 2005 | Azadi, Tehran, Iran | Azerbaijan | 2–0 | 2–1 | Friendly | |
| 10 | 24 August 2005 | Azadi, Tehran, Iran | Libya | 2–0 | 4–0 | Friendly | |
| 11 | 24 August 2005 | Azadi, Tehran, Iran | Libya | 4–0 | 4–0 | Friendly | |
| 12 | 16 August 2006 | Azadi, Tehran, Iran | Syria | 1–0 | 1–1 | 2007 Asian Cup qualification | |
| 13 | 6 September 2006 | Abbasiyyin, Damascus, Syria | Syria | 2–0 | 2–0 | 2007 Asian Cup qualification | |
| 14 | 2 July 2007 | Azadi, Tehran, Iran | Jamaica | 1–0 | 8–1 | Friendly | |
| 15 | 2 July 2007 | Azadi, Tehran, Iran | Jamaica | 3–0 | 8–1 | Friendly | |
| 16 | 15 July 2007 | National Stadium, Bukit Jalil, Malaysia | China | 2–2 | 2–2 | 2007 AFC Asian Cup | |
| 17 | 18 July 2007 | National Stadium, Bukit Jalal, Malaysia | Malaysia | 1–0 | 2–0 | 2007 AFC Asian Cup | |
| 18 | 25 May 2008 | Azadi, Tehran, Iran | Zambia | 1–0 | 3–2 | Friendly | |
| 19 | 22 June 2008 | Azadi, Tehran, Iran | Kuwait | 1–0 | 2–0 | 2010 World Cup qualification | |
| 20 | 6 September 2008 | King Fahd International, Riyadh, Saudi Arabia | Saudi Arabia | 1–1 | 1–1 | 2010 World Cup qualification | |
| 21 | 15 October 2008 | Azadi, Tehran, Iran | North Korea | 2–0 | 2–1 | 2010 World Cup qualification | |
| 22 | 11 February 2009 | Azadi, Tehran, Iran | South Korea | 1–0 | 1–1 | 2010 World Cup qualification | |
| 23 | 14 November 2009 | Azadi, Tehran, Iran | Jordan | 1–0 | 1–0 | 2011 Asian Cup qualification | |
| 24 | 3 March 2010 | Azadi, Tehran, Iran | Thailand | 1–0 | 1–0 | 2011 Asian Cup qualification | |
| 25 | 2 January 2011 | Jassim Bin Hamad, Doha, Qatar | Angola | 1–0 | 1–0 | Friendly | |
| 26 | 2 September 2011 | Azadi, Tehran, Iran | Indonesia | 1–0 | 3–0 | 2014 World Cup qualification | |
| 27 | 2 September 2011 | Azadi, Tehran, Iran | Indonesia | 2–0 | 3–0 | 2014 World Cup qualification | |
| 28 | 5 October 2011 | Azadi, Tehran, Iran | Palestine | 3–0 | 7–0 | Friendly | |
| 29 | 15 November 2011 | Gelora Bung Karno, Jakarta, Indonesia | Indonesia | 4–1 | 4–1 | 2014 World Cup qualification | |
| 30 | 16 October 2012 | Azadi, Tehran, Iran | South Korea | 1–0 | 1–0 | 2014 World Cup qualification | |
| 31 | 6 February 2013 | Azadi, Tehran, Iran | Lebanon | 2–0 | 5–0 | 2015 Asian Cup qualification | |
| 32 | 6 February 2013 | Azadi, Tehran, Iran | Lebanon | 3–0 | 5–0 | 2015 Asian Cup qualification | |
| 33 | 6 February 2013 | Azadi, Tehran, Iran | Lebanon | 5–0 | 5–0 | 2015 Asian Cup qualification | |
| 34 | 11 June 2013 | Azadi, Tehran, Iran | Lebanon | 2–0 | 4–0 | 2014 World Cup qualification | |
| 35 | 11 June 2013 | Azadi, Tehran, Iran | Lebanon | 4–0 | 4–0 | 2014 World Cup qualification | |
| 36 | 19 November 2013 | Camille Chamoun, Beirut, Lebanon | Lebanon | 3–0 | 4–1 | 2015 Asian Cup qualification | |
| 37 | 26 March 2015 | NV Arena, Sankt Pölten, Austria | Chile | 1–0 | 2–0 | Friendly | |
| 38 | 31 March 2015 | Friends Arena, Solna, Sweden | Sweden | 1–2 | 1–3 | Friendly | |

== Managerial statistics ==
As of 30 September 2024

| Team | From | To | Record | | | | |
| Team | From | To | G | W | D | L | Win % |
|---|---|---|---|---|---|---|---|
| Khooneh be Khooneh | 1 August 2017 | 10 January 2018 | 22 | 12 | 8 | 2 | 54.55 |
| Nassaji Mazandaran | 1 March 2018 | 1 January 2019 | 29 | 12 | 11 | 6 | 41.38 |
| Foolad | 1 June 2019 | 23 August 2021 | 73 | 29 | 28 | 16 | 39.73 |
| Foolad | 7 November 2021 | 22 February 2023 | 57 | 24 | 22 | 11 | 42.11 |
| Esteghlal | 21 June 2023 | 1 October 2024 | 38 | 21 | 12 | 5 | 55.26 |
| Total | | | 219 | 98 | 81 | 40 | 44.75 |

== Honours ==
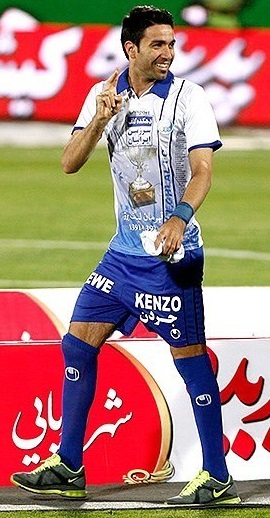
Nekounam celebrating Esteghlal's 2012–13 league title

=== Player ===
Pas

- Iran Pro League: 2003–04

Esteghlal

- Iran Pro League: 2012–13

Al-Kuwait

- Kuwait Emir Cup: 2013–14

Iran

- Asian Games:2002
- AFC – OFC Challenge Cup: 2003
- West Asian Football Federation Championship: 2004

Individual

- Iran football award winners: Player of the Year
- AFC Champions League Dream Team: 2013
- Asian Footballer of the Year nominee: 2013

=== Manager ===
Nassaji Mazandaran

- Azadegan League: runner-up (promotion) 2017–18

Foolad

- Hazfi Cup: 2020–21
- Iranian Super Cup: 2021

Esteghlal

- Iran Pro League runner-up: 2023–24

== Personal life ==
On 4 January 2026, Nekounam publicly supported the 2025–2026 Iranian protests on his Instagram, stating: "This sound of protest you hear is the sound of people's lives becoming suffocated." On 9 February 2026, he publicly objected to being included on a list of supporters of the 1979 Islamic Revolution by the Ministry of Sport and Youth, ahead of the Revolution's anniversary.

== See also ==
- List of men's footballers with 100 or more international caps
- Iranians in Spain
