= 2015 in Kuwait =

- Decades: 1990s; 2000s; 2010s; 2020s
- See also: Other events of 2015; List of years in Kuwait; Timeline of Kuwaiti history

The following lists events that happened during 2015 in the State of Kuwait.

== Incumbents ==
- Emir: Sabah Al-Ahmad Al-Jaber Al-Sabah
- Prime Minister: Jaber Al-Mubarak Al-Hamad Al-Sabah

== Events ==
=== June ===
- June 26 - A Shia mosque is bombed in Kuwait City, killing 27 people and injuring 227.

== Sport ==
=== January ===
- January 9 - The 2015 AFC Asian Cup holds the opening ceremony, followed by the first game in Group A between Australia and Kuwait in Melbourne Rectangular Stadium. Australia wins the match 4–1.

== Deaths ==
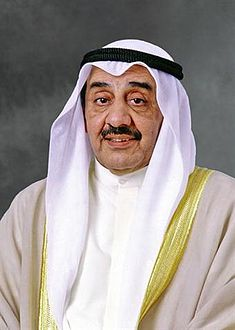
Jassem Al-Kharafi

- 11 April – Ahmad Al-Saleh, actor (b. 1938).
- 21 May – Jassem Al-Kharafi, businessman and politician (b. 1940).
- 4 July – Muhammad Baqir al-Muhri, shi'ite cleric (b. 1948).
- 22 December – Nabil Al Fadl, politician and journalist (b. 1949).
