= 2014 in Kuwait =

- Decades: 1990s; 2000s; 2010s; 2020s
- See also: Other events of 2014; List of years in Kuwait; Timeline of Kuwaiti history

Events from the year 2014 in Kuwait.

== Incumbents ==
- Emir: Sabah Al-Ahmad Al-Jaber Al-Sabah
- Prime Minister: Jaber Al-Mubarak Al-Hamad Al-Sabah

== Sports ==
- 2013–14 Kuwaiti Federation Cup
- 2013–14 Kuwait Emir Cup

== See also ==
- Years in Jordan
- Years in Syria
