= Florin Motroc =

Romanian footballer

Personal information
- Full name: Florin Motroc
- Date of birth: 8 August 1967 (age 59)
- Place of birth: Bucharest, Romania
- Position: Midfielder

Team information
- Current team: East Riffa (head coach)

Youth career
- 1974–1985: Rapid București
- 1985–1987: Sportul Studențesc

Senior career*
Years	Team	Apps	(Gls)
1987–1990	Sportul Studențesc		
1990–1992	FC Argeș		
1992–1993	Selena Bacău		
1993–1996	Rapid București		
1996–1997	Ceahlăul Piatra Neamț		
1997–1998	Farul Constanța		
1998–1999	Sheriff Tiraspol		
2000–2001	UM Timișoara		
2003	Al-Jahra		

International career
1988–1989	Romania U21	4	(1)
	Romania B	5	(0)

Managerial career
- 2000–2002: Al Shabab (assistant)
- 2002–2003: Rapid București U21
- 2003: Al-Jahra (assistant)
- 2004: Al-Jahra
- 2004–2005: Baniyas (assistant)
- 2005: Rocar București
- 2005–2006: Pandurii Târgu Jiu (assistant)
- 2006: Pandurii Târgu Jiu
- 2006: Sportul Studențesc (assistant)
- 2006–2007: Prefab 05 Modelu
- 2007–2008: Rapid II București
- 2009–2010: Sportul Studențesc
- 2010: Farul II Constanța
- 2010: Al-Taawoun (assistant)
- 2010–2011: Al-Taawoun
- 2012–2013: Shabab Al-Ordon
- 2013–2014: Al-Riffa
- 2014–2015: Al-Ramtha
- 2015–2017: Kazma
- 2017: Dhofar
- 2018: Al-Ramtha
- 2018–2019: Al-Jabalain
- 2020: Al-Shabab
- 2020–2022: East Riffa
- 2023: Al-Najma
- 2023–2025: Khaitan SC
- 2025–: East Riffa
- * Club domestic league appearances and goals

Florin Motroc (born 8 August 1967) is a Romanian former footballer and head coach.

He is the son of Ion Motroc, also a former footballer and the father of Vlad Motroc, currently player of Kuwaiti Division One side Burgan.

== Honours ==
=== Player ===
Rapid București

- Cupa Ligii winner: 1993–94
- Cupa României runner-up: 1994–95

Sheriff Tiraspol

- Moldovan Cup: 1998–99

=== Manager ===
Jahra SC (assistant)

- Kuwaiti Division One: 2002–03

Baniyas SC (assistant)

- UAE First Division League: 2004–05

Shabab Al-Ordon

- Jordanian Pro League: 2012–13
- Jordan Super Cup: 2013

Al-Riffa

- Bahraini Premier League: 2013–14
- Bahraini FA Cup: 2013–14

Kazma

- Kuwait Federation Cup: 2015–16
- Kuwait Emir Cup runner-up: 2016–17

Dhofar

- Oman Super Cup: 2017

East Riffa

- Bahraini Premier League runner-up / Vice-champion

2020–21

- Bahraini FA Cup runner-up: 2020–21
- Bahraini Super Cup runner-up: 2021
- Bahraini King's Cup runner-up: 2021–22
- Bahraini Second Division League Promotion Premier League: 2025-26

== Personal life ==
Florin is the son of Ion Motroc (former Rapid Bucharest and Romania national team player). He is also the father of Vlad Motroc who plays for Burgan. His father-in-law, Constantin Olteanu was also a footballer.
