= 1983 in Kuwait =

- Decades: 1960s; 1970s; 1980s; 1990s; 2000s
- See also: Other events of 1983; List of years in Kuwait; Timeline of Kuwaiti history

Events from the year 1983 in Kuwait.

== Incumbents ==
- Emir: Jaber Al-Ahmad Al-Jaber Al-Sabah
- Prime Minister: Saad Al-Salim Al-Sabah

== Births ==
- 17 August – Ali Al Shamali
- 1 December – Fahad Al Fahad
- 7 December – Fayez Bandar
