= Bo's Coffee =

Filipino coffeehouse chain

- Type: Private
- Industry: Coffee shop
- Founded: June 28, 1996; 29 years ago in Cebu City, Philippines
- Founder: Steve Benitez
- Headquarters: Cebu City, Philippines,
- Number of locations: 103 (2018)
- Products: Coffee
- Website: www.boscoffee.com

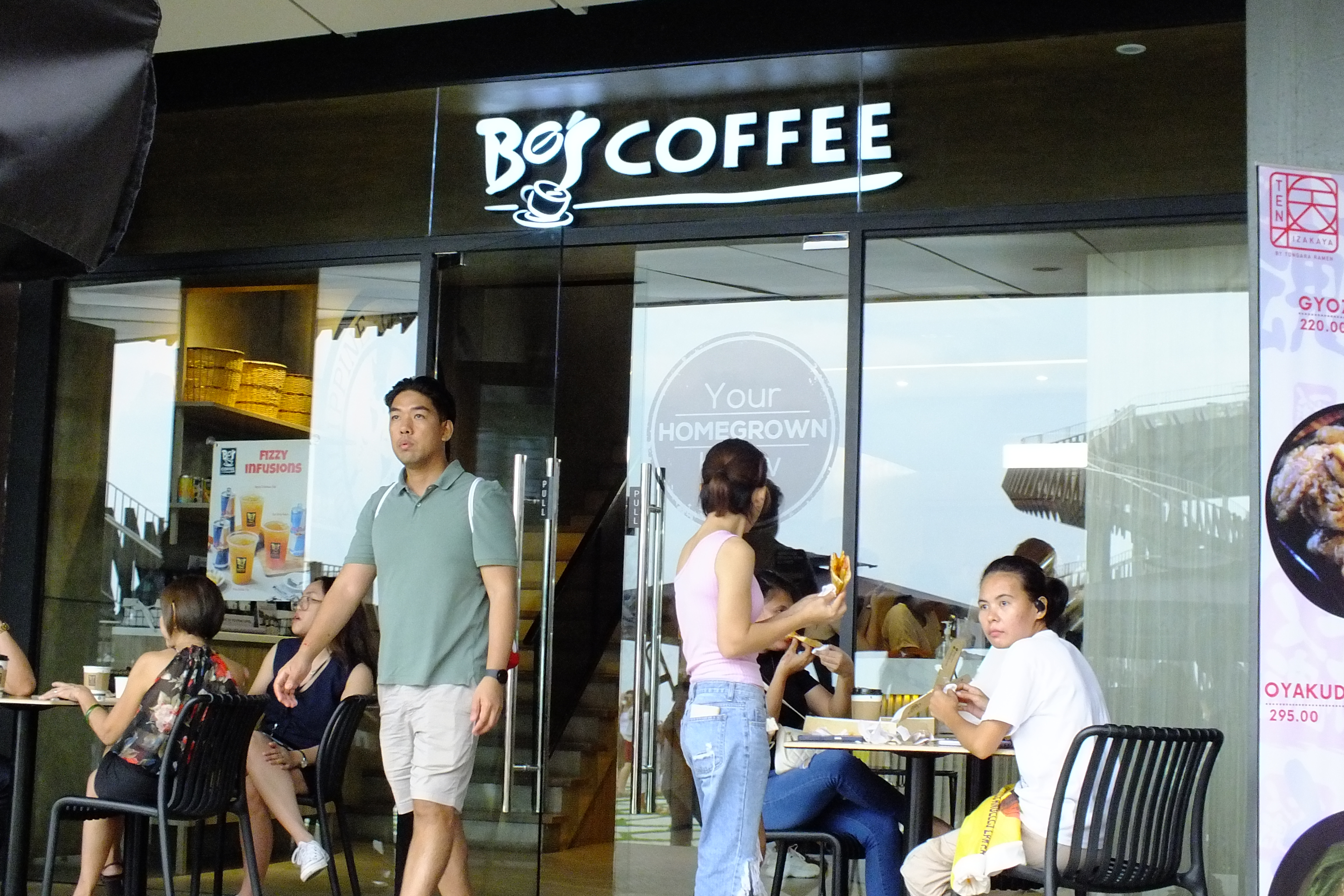
Bo's Coffee store in TOPS Cebu.

Bo's Coffee is a Filipino coffee and coffeehouse chain. It was founded by Steve Benitez in 1996 in Cebu City, Philippines. The company operates a total of 91 outlets throughout the Philippines, with about 30 of them located in Metro Cebu, where it is based. Bo's Coffee sources coffee beans from farmers from Sagada, Mountain Province, Mount Kitanglad in Bukidnon, Mount Matutum in Tupi, South Cotabato, and Mount Apo.

The shop was unsuccessfully founded in 1996. After a period of low sales, Benitez bought a coffee machine to expand the business. Benitez sold free samples, which steadily increased the business and led the business to have another branch.

The shop has a total of 103 branches, with two in United Arab Emirates and eight in Qatar.

The business has differing products, such as coffee beans originating from different regions in the Philippines, to coffee-related drinks, although there are some non-coffee drinks. There are also snacks such as cake. The business has had a partnership with Red Bull. It has relatively positive reviews, with reviewers noting their store's appearance and reported efficiency, though some problems are noted, like bugs and insects to slow workers.

== History ==
=== Origins and start ===
The idea of starting a coffee shop came to Steve Benitez when he was a student in Ateneo de Manila University. Benitez drank coffee to stay awake while studying. In 1992, his parents wanted to shut down their family-owned business, specifically Ric's Barbeque located on Ramos Street, Cebu City. Steve, the youngest of the five Benitez siblings, took over the management of the family business and left Ateneo de Manila Law School. After attending various seminars, Steve Benitez decided to open Bo's Coffee in Ayala Center Cebu in June 1996. Two months before the shop opened, his business partners backed out. The business wasn't successful in the first few months, with daily sales of 300 pesos ($5) to 1,000 ($17), less than the rent of 10,000 pesos ($174).

=== Spread and present ===
Benitez bought his first coffee machine from a coffee show in Singapore for 65,000 pesos ($1,130). He hand-carried the machine in his flight back to Cebu and started on an investment of 100,000 pesos ($1,739). At first, Benitez gave away free samples, as the Cebuano market was not yet familiar with his concept. Sales picked up on the sixth month and then steadily increased, enabling him to put up another coffee cart in SM City Cebu.

In June 2016, commemorating the 20th anniversary of Bo's Coffee, the brand created a festival named Coffeechella in Cebu. The store hosted the event, with 25 other stores participating in the event, such as Bayani Brew, Anthill Fabric Gallery, Theo & Philo, Tsaa Laya, Habi, and Loudbasstard. An art exhibition was displayed, with coffee painting lessons. In 2018, the Navegar Fund decided to invest in the company to help farmers, one of the missions of the Philippine-focused fund. Other than funds, the company invested in newer brands such as Theo and Philo Chocolates, Bayani Brew, Anthill Fabric Gallery, and Hope in a Bottle.

In 2019, Bo's Coffee released a new ordering system named "BOTTY". Plans were made for this system two years prior. The program took place in Messenger, where users search "Bo’s Coffee Advance Ordering BOTTY" and follow set instructions. The program took place in one store and spread through other stores. As the pandemic intensified, the company moved their orders online. In 2020, Bo's Coffee released a digital service named "Bo's Coffee Daily". Other methods included delivery with Foodpanda, GrabFood and GLife. Because of the pandemic, Bo's Coffee reopened their stores with additional safety measures. Sanitation measures were implemented, with sanitation mats and an automatic hand dispenser in the entrance. The stores included temperature checks. Air conditioners and vents were sanitized, and workers were required to wear face masks. In December 2020, Bo's Coffee released a Christmas Planner and a Christmas card containing patterns from the Cordillera Administrative Region. Hand-drawn elements were in the cards, with weave designs imprinted into their cups. Other beverages were also released.

=== Future ===
In 2024, Bo's Coffee plans to open 35 locations. The store plans to gain 50 locations in 2025. Two other locations are planned in Dubai and Qatar. The business is talking to other partners, bringing the business to Canada too, though the launch date has yet to be confirmed. About the expansion, Benitez stated: "We don’t go out on our own, we always look for a partner."

=== Etymology ===
Benitez said that the name comes from an Italian American coffee expert named "Bo", whom he met in a coffee roadshow in New Orleans in the mid-1990s.

== Branches ==
An estimated 200,000 people go to Bo's Coffee every year. A ratio of 30:70 is between company-owned stores and franchised stores.

=== Local ===
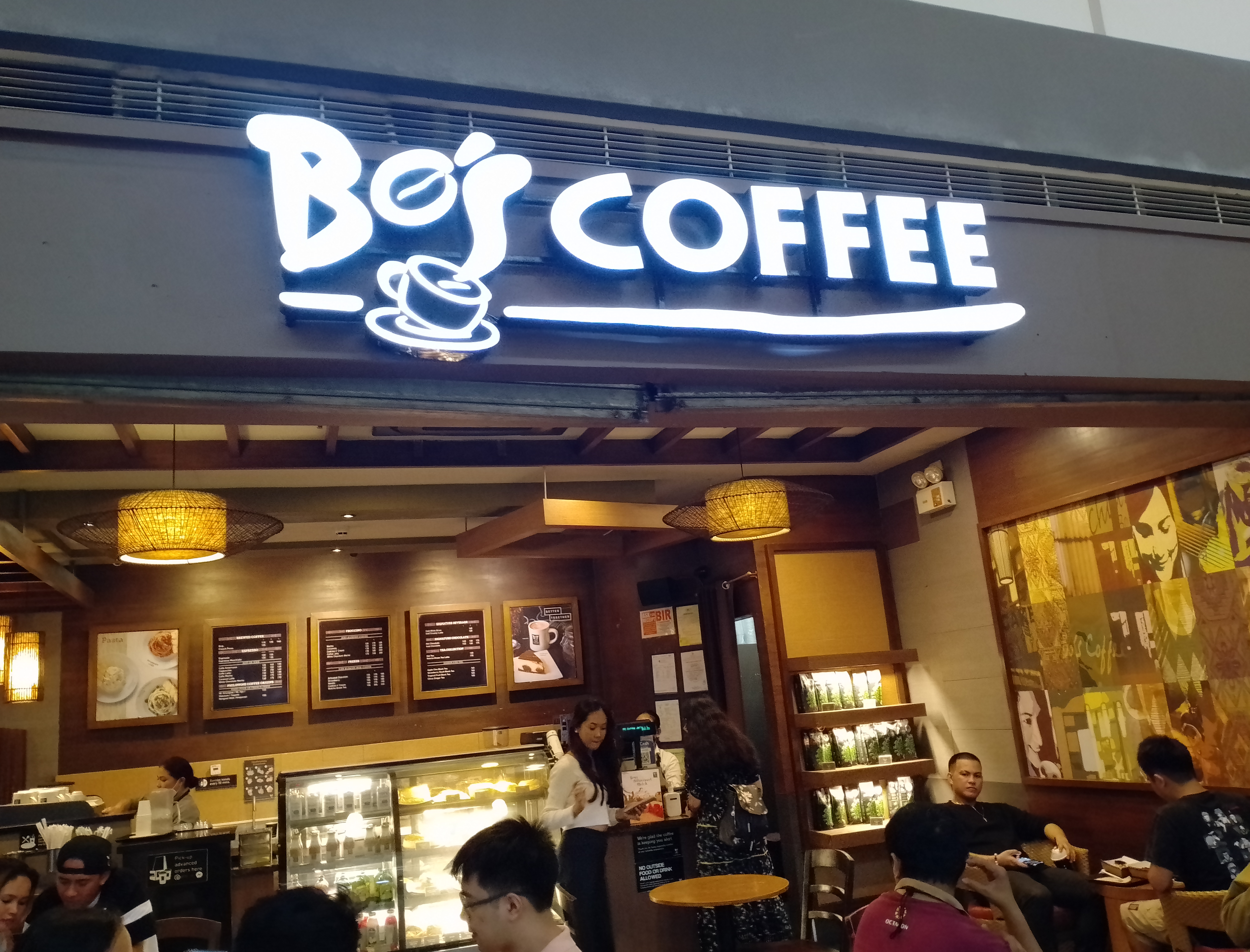
Bo's Coffee branch at SM City Cebu

As of December 6, 2018, the store has over 103 branches throughout the Philippines, most of them located in key cities. A large number of these branches are located in Metro Cebu, where the company is based. Many of the shops are in malls, while some flagship stores are outside malls. The biggest branch is located in Marawi, a 250-seater cafe in the middle of the city. The cafe has 882.56 square meters of space, with designs originating from the Sarimanok, the Malong, and the Torogan house.

=== International ===
Bo's Coffee opened its first international branch, located in Doha, Qatar, on April 25, 2018. The company collaborated with Al Majed Grouping to open the branch. Two other stores opened in 2024. Eight locations are currently present in Qatar. They also have 5 branches in the United Arab Emirates with Al Mulla Business Group. The first UAE store opened in November 2022 at the BurJuman mall in Dubai.

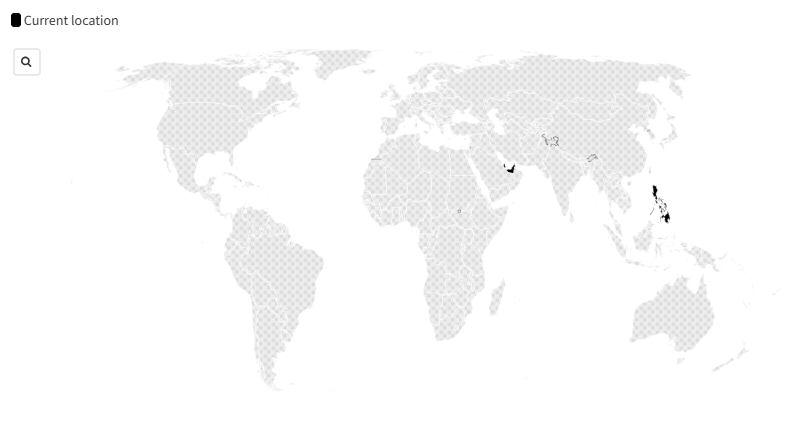
Bo's coffee locations as of 2024 displayed as Countries

== Products and description ==
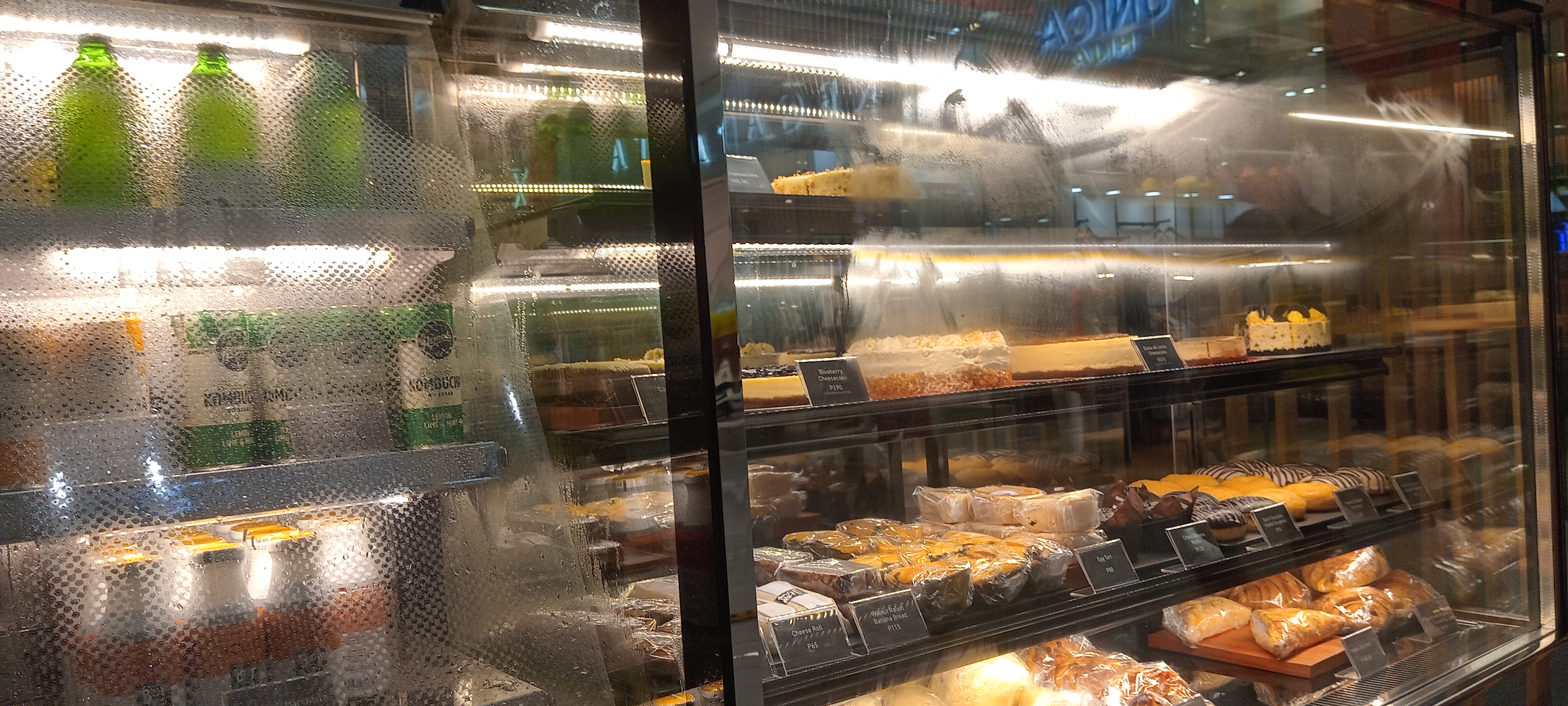
A glass-covered menu present at Bo's Coffee, Tacloban.

=== Coffee beans ===
Collaborating with farmers, Bo's Coffee released its line of five coffee products. Sagada, originating from an area in the Cordillera Administrative Region. It reportedly tastes "sweet and nutty" with hints of chocolate and tobacco. Atok and Ampucao, originating from Benguet, reportedly smells like herbs. Mount Kitanglad, the fourth highest mountain in the Philippines with the product also named after the mountain, tastes "light and nutty". Mount Apo, named after the highest mountain in the Philippines, tastes "sweet and earthly". The last, Mount Matutum, named after a mountain in South Cotabato, tastes "a bit spicy".

=== Drinks ===
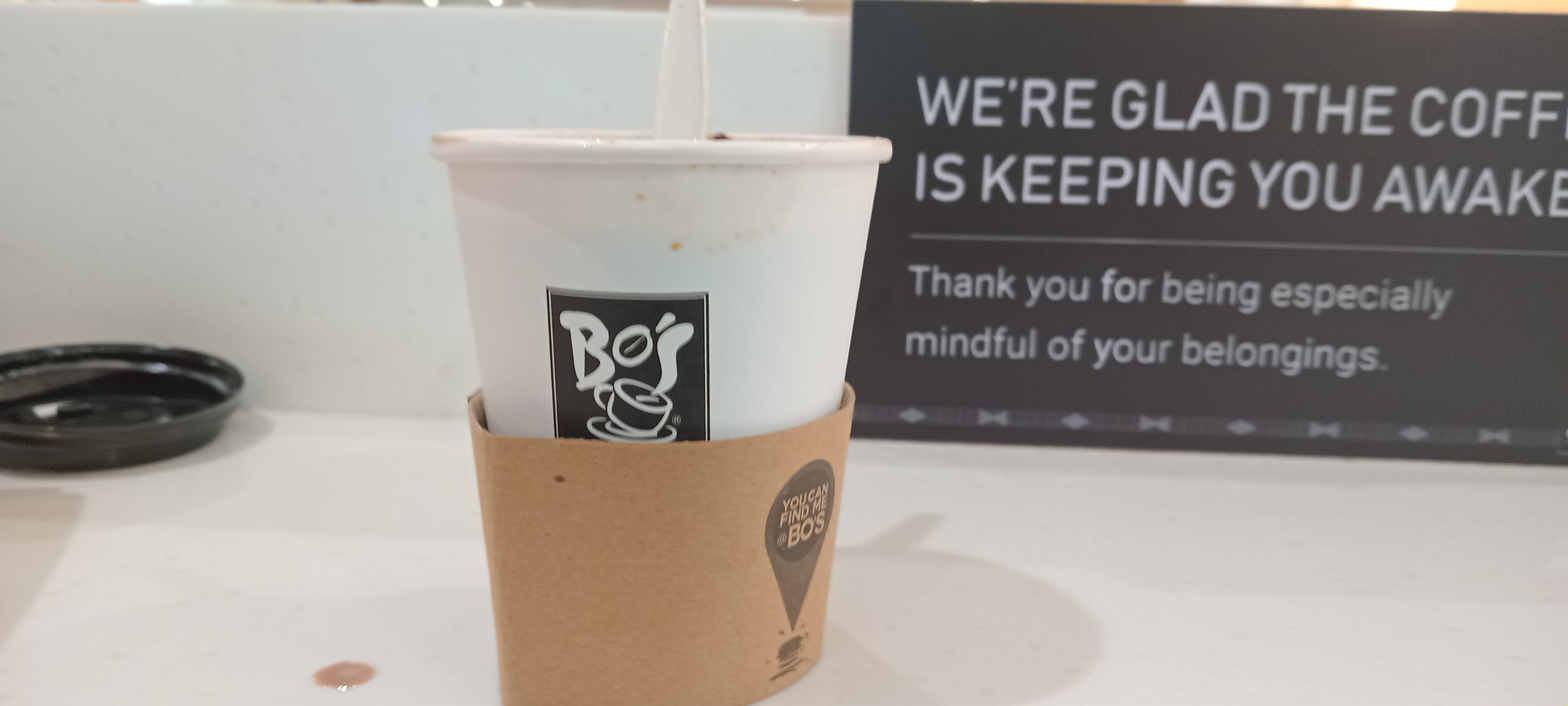
The Bo's Coffee's hot chocolate - A drink served in a white cup.

The Cold White Brew, one of their most popular drinks, tastes "particularly strong with a dash of cream". Another drink, includes the Philippine Coffee Origins Drink, made from their exported beans. They also have Caffè americano, Latte, and Caffè mocha. Other drinks include the Froccino and Freezes, the cafe's version of Frappuccinos. Froccino is more coffee-based like the original while Freezes are more like smoothies. There are also some non-coffee drinks, such as iced tea, Matcha latte, and Hot Chocolate.

=== Snacks and food ===
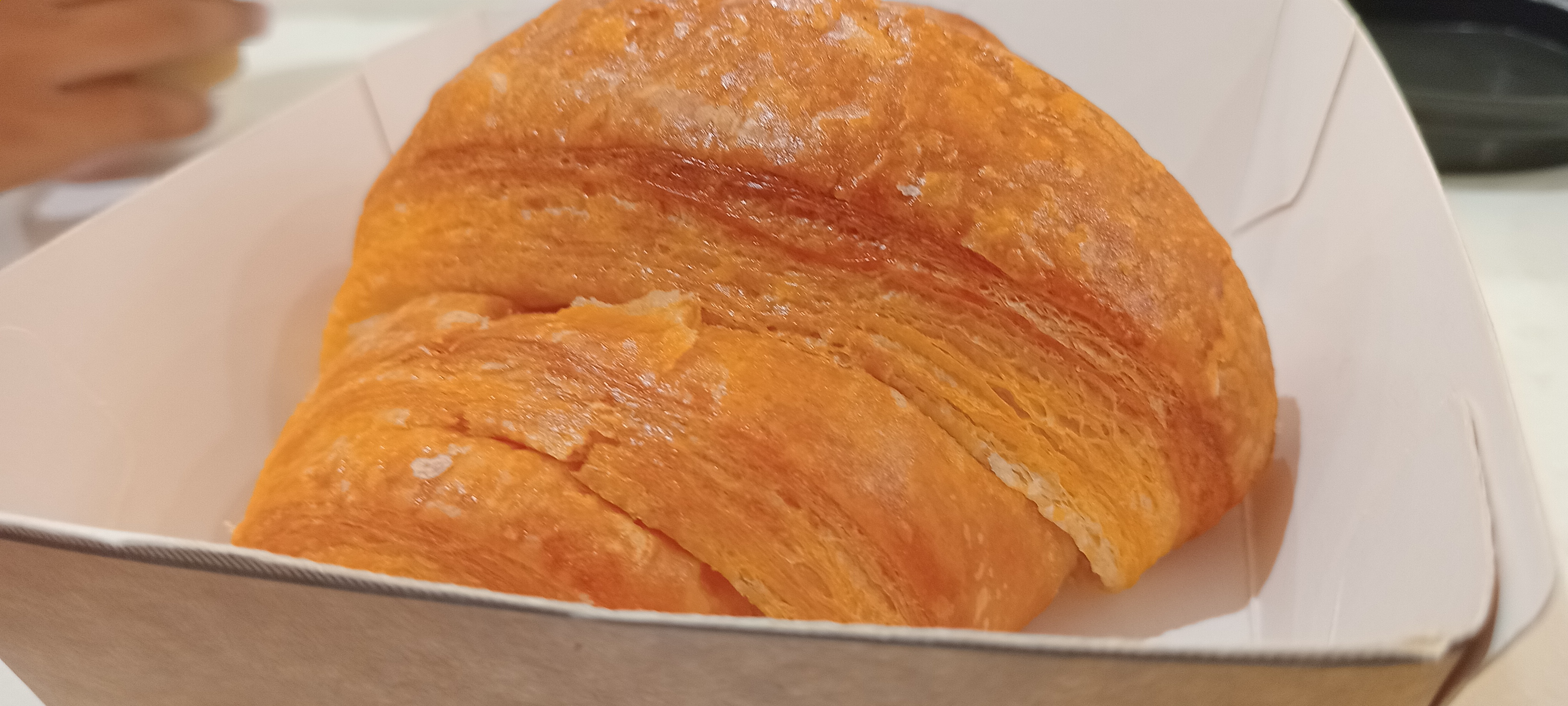
The Bo's Coffee Croissant - A bread item served in a white cardboard container.

Bo's Coffee has plenty of cakes, including the New York Cheesecake, the Dulce de leche, Blueberry Cheesecake, and Oreo Cheesecake. Other desserts include donuts, waffles, cookies, and bread. There are also some meals, including bacon and corn beef. Pasta is also served with a slice of garlic bread.

== Advertising ==
On July 1, 2023, Bo's Coffee and Red Bull partnered, creating two Red Bull-infused drinks, named the Sunset Orange Fizz and the Golden Passion Bliss. The Sunset Orange Fizz combined Red Bull with orange juice and strawberry syrup. Gold Passion Bliss was more tropical and tangier. The partnership ended on August 31, the same year.

== Reception ==
Blog website Coffeehan described the place to "recommend to anyone who likes good tasting coffee". Some complaints were said about the prices, although the rest turned out to be positive. The blog also added that Bo's Coffee "makes good coffee, which is not a disservice to the word in the company's name". Travel website TripZilla described Bo's as having a "peaceful environment", adding "you can never go wrong with Bo's". In another post, TripZilla described the shop as a "cozy, laid-back, coffee shop". Another positive review came from website Laptop Friendly Cafe, which described it as a "peaceful escape, perfect for studying and socializing", the seats also create a "serene ambience". Some complaints were made about mosquitoes and slow service. The review also noted "well-maintained environment", "friendly staff", "elegant interior", and more.

SunStar described the coffee as indicating a "base of Coffea arabica" but with a more "pleasant, mellow finish". Blog website BeingJellyBeans described the store as a "versatile space for every occasion". "The moment you step inside, you’re greeted by warm, inviting interiors," the blog added. The blog website ended the review with a positive note, saying that the "next time you're in Makati, make sure to experience it yourself". Another blog website Food in Space described it as an "eco-friendly cafe", with the interior noting "woods, bricks, and rattan". Just before the opening of the General Santos Branch, local news website Gensan News described the food as "the best delectable cakes and coffees from the kitchen".

== See also ==
- J.CO Donuts
- List of coffeehouse chains
