= 1995 in Kuwait =

- Decades: 1970s; 1980s; 1990s; 2000s; 2010s
- See also: Other events of 1995; List of years in Kuwait; Timeline of Kuwaiti history

Events from the year 1995 in Kuwait.

== Incumbents ==
- Emir: Jaber Al-Ahmad Al-Jaber Al-Sabah
- Prime Minister: Saad Al-Salim Al-Sabah

== Establishment ==
- Gulfsat.

== See also ==
- Years in Jordan
- Years in Syria
