= 1990 in Kuwait =

- Decades: 1970s; 1980s; 1990s; 2000s; 2010s
- See also: Other events of 1990; List of years in Kuwait; Timeline of Kuwaiti history

Events from the year 1990 in Kuwait.

== Incumbents ==
- Emir: Jaber Al-Ahmad Al-Jaber Al-Sabah
- Prime Minister: Saad Al-Salim Al-Sabah

== Events ==
July to September

- August 2 – Iraq invaded Kuwait. See: Gulf War

== Births ==
- 12 May – Ibrahim Majid.
- 11 August – Talal Al Fadhel.
- 9 October – Yousef Nasser.

== Deaths ==
- 17 June – Ahmad Meshari Al-Adwani
- 2 August – Fahad Al-Ahmed Al-Jaber Al-Sabah
