= 1985 in Kuwait =

- Decades: 1960s; 1970s; 1980s; 1990s; 2000s
- See also: Other events of 1985; List of years in Kuwait; Timeline of Kuwaiti history

Events from the year 1985 in Kuwait.

== Incumbents ==
- Emir: Jaber Al-Ahmad Al-Jaber Al-Sabah
- Prime Minister: Saad Al-Salim Al-Sabah

== Events ==
=== February ===
- 21 February - 1985 Kuwaiti general election

== Births ==
- 5 January - Bader Al-Mutawa.
- 16 February - Khaled Al Qahtani.
- 26 February - Fahad Awadh.
- 12 March - Ali Al Kandari.
