= 1994 in Kuwait =

- Decades: 1970s; 1980s; 1990s; 2000s; 2010s
- See also: Other events of 1994; List of years in Kuwait; Timeline of Kuwaiti history

The following events occurred in Kuwait in the year 1994.

== Incumbents ==
- Emir: Jaber Al-Ahmad Al-Jaber Al-Sabah
- Prime Minister: Saad Al-Salim Al-Sabah

== Events ==
- Operation Vigilant Warrior.
- Kuwaiti Premier League 1993–94
- Kuwaiti Premier League 1994–95

== See also ==
- Years in Jordan
- Years in Syria
