= 2004 in Kuwait =

- Decades: 1980s; 1990s; 2000s; 2010s; 2020s
- See also: Other events of 2004; List of years in Kuwait; Timeline of Kuwaiti history

Events from the year 2004 in Kuwait.

== Incumbents ==
- Emir: Jaber Al-Ahmad Al-Jaber Al-Sabah
- Prime Minister: Sabah Al-Ahmad Al-Jaber Al-Sabah

== Events ==
- Kuwaiti Premier League 2003–04.
- Kuwaiti Premier League 2004–05.

== Establishments ==
- American University of Kuwait.
