= 2013 in Kuwait =

- Decades: 1990s; 2000s; 2010s; 2020s
- See also: Other events of 2013; List of years in Kuwait; Timeline of Kuwaiti history

Events from the year 2013 in Kuwait.

== Incumbents ==
- Emir: Sabah Al-Ahmad Al-Jaber Al-Sabah
- Prime Minister: Jaber Al-Mubarak Al-Hamad Al-Sabah

== Events ==
=== April ===
- April 15 - Kuwaiti opposition leader Musallam Al-Barrak is given a two-year prison sentence for insulting Emir Sabah Al-Ahmad Al-Jaber Al-Sabah.

=== June ===
- June 16 - Kuwait's Constitutional Court dissolves the nation's parliament and orders new elections.

=== July ===
- July 27 - Voters in Kuwait go to the polls for a general elections (2013 Kuwaiti general election).

=== August ===
- August 29 - A Kuwaiti newspaper reports that Gulf leaders have been in touch with Israel, and have asked that Israel act “with restraint” in the event of an attack by Western nations on Syria.
