= 1993 in Kuwait =

- Decades: 1970s; 1980s; 1990s; 2000s; 2010s
- See also: Other events of 1993; List of years in Kuwait; Timeline of Kuwaiti history

Events from the year 1993 in Kuwait.

== Incumbents ==
- Emir: Jaber Al-Ahmad Al-Jaber Al-Sabah
- Prime Minister: Saad Al-Salim Al-Sabah

== Births ==
- 13 February - Abdul Rahman Al Shammari
- 24 July - Talal Al-Rashidi
- 27 October - Yaqoub Al Taher

== See also ==
- Years in Jordan
- Years in Syria
