= 2006 in Kuwait =

- Decades: 1980s; 1990s; 2000s; 2010s; 2020s
- See also: Other events of 2006; List of years in Kuwait; Timeline of Kuwaiti history

Events from the year 2006 in Kuwait.

== Incumbents ==
- Emir:
  - until 15 January: Jaber Al-Ahmad Al-Jaber Al-Sabah
  - 15–24 January: Saad Al-Salim Al-Sabah
  - 24–29 January: Vacant
  - starting 29 January: Sabah Al-Ahmad Al-Jaber Al-Sabah
- Prime Minister: Sabah Al-Ahmad Al-Jaber Al-Sabah (until 30 January), Nasser Al-Sabah (starting 7 February)

== Events ==
- February — Nasser Mohammed Al-Ahmed Al-Sabah became the Prime minister.
