= 1991 in Kuwait =

- Decades: 1970s; 1980s; 1990s; 2000s; 2010s
- See also: Other events of 1991; List of years in Kuwait; Timeline of Kuwaiti history

Events from the year 1991 in Kuwait.

== Incumbents ==
- Emir: Jaber Al-Ahmad Al-Jaber Al-Sabah
- Prime Minister: Saad Al-Salim Al-Sabah

== Events ==
January to March

Gulf War:

- January 16 - Operation Desert Storm (American) began.
- February 26 - Saddam Hussein withdrew Iraqi troops from Kuwait.
- February 28 - Ceasefire

April to June

July to September

October to December

== Births ==
- 29 September - Abdulaziz Al Salimi.
- 9 October - Faisal Zaid.
- 10 November - Fahed Al Hajri.
