= 2011 Kuwait Emir Cup =

Tournament details
- Country: Kuwait
- Dates: 5 May – 7 June 2011
- Teams: 13

Final positions
- Champions: Kazma (7th title)
- Runners-up: Kuwait
- Semifinalists: Qadsia; Al-Nasr

Tournament statistics
- Matches played: 13
- Goals scored: 39 (3 per match)

The Kuwaiti Emir Cup is the premier cup competition involving teams from the Kuwaiti Premier League and the Kuwaiti Division One league.

The 2011 edition is the 48th to be held.

The winners qualify for the 2012 AFC Cup.

== First round ==
5 May 2011	Al Salmiya	1–3	Khaitan

5 May 2011	Sulaibikhat	0–3	Al Jahra

6 May 2011	Al Fahaheel	1–0	Sahel

6 May 2011	Al Arabi	0–1	Al Shabab

7 May 2011	Tadamon	0–3	Kazma

7 May 2011	Al Naser	3–0	Al Yarmouk

== Quarter-finals ==
20 May 2011	Kazma	3–2	Khaitan

20 May 2011	Al Qadsia	5–2	Al Shabab

21 May 2011	Al Kuwait	4–0	Al Fahaheel

21 May 2011	Al Jahra	0–2	Al Naser

== Semi-finals ==
30 May 2011	Kazma	1–0	Al Qadsia

31 May 2011	Al Kuwait	3–1	Al Naser

== Final ==
The played on June 7, and Kazma won the cup.

7 June 2011	Kazma	1–0	Al Kuwait
