= 2010 in Kuwait =

- Decades: 1990s; 2000s; 2010s; 2020s
- See also: Other events of 2010; List of years in Kuwait; Timeline of Kuwaiti history

The following lists events that happened during 2010 in Kuwait.

== Incumbents ==
- Emir: Sabah Al-Ahmad Al-Jaber Al-Sabah
- Prime Minister: Nasser Al-Sabah

== Events ==
=== July ===
- July 30 - A United States Army private suspected of sending thousands of classified documents to WikiLeaks is transferred from Kuwait to a US Marines brig in Quantico, Virginia.

=== August ===
- August 3 - Seven people go on trial in Kuwait accused of spying for Iran against Kuwait and the United States; they deny all charges and say they were tortured into confessing.
- August 11 - The United States threatens to sell an anti-ballistic missile to Kuwait to counter alleged "current and future threats".

== Deaths ==
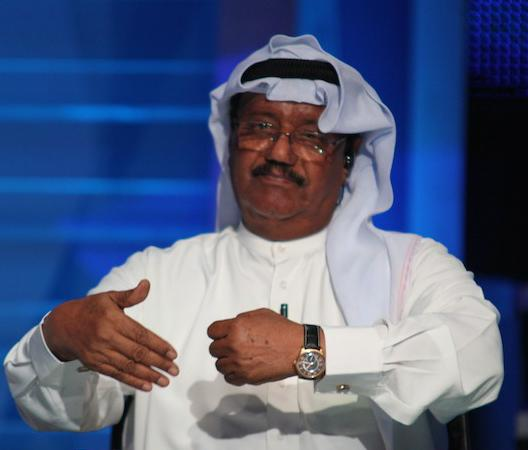
Ghanem Al-Saleh

- 19 October – Ghanem Al-Saleh, actor (b. 1943).
