= 1984 in Kuwait =

- Decades: 1960s; 1970s; 1980s; 1990s; 2000s
- See also: Other events of 1984; List of years in Kuwait; Timeline of Kuwaiti history

Events from the year 1984 in Kuwait.

== Incumbents ==
- Emir: Jaber Al-Ahmad Al-Jaber Al-Sabah
- Prime Minister: Saad Al-Salim Al-Sabah

== Births ==
- 13 May - Ahmad Ajab
- 18 June - Ahmed Saad Al Rashidi
