= 1989 in Kuwait =

- Decades: 1960s; 1970s; 1980s; 1990s; 2000s
- See also: Other events of 1989; List of years in Kuwait; Timeline of Kuwaiti history

Events from the year 1989 in Kuwait.

== Incumbents ==
- Emir: Jaber Al-Ahmad Al-Jaber Al-Sabah
- Prime Minister: Saad Al-Salim Al-Sabah

== Births ==
- 22 May - Abdulaziz Al-Mandeel
- 6 December - Hamad Aman
