= 2005 in Kuwait =

- Decades: 1980s; 1990s; 2000s; 2010s; 2020s
- See also: Other events of 2005; List of years in Kuwait; Timeline of Kuwaiti history

The following lists events that happened during 2005 in Kuwait.

== Incumbents ==
- Emir: Jaber Al-Ahmad Al-Jaber Al-Sabah
- Prime Minister: Sabah Al-Ahmad Al-Jaber Al-Sabah

== Events ==
=== January ===
- January 30 - A firefight leaves 3 suspected militants and one Kuwaiti police officer dead after security forces raid an alleged hideout in Kuwait City.

== Establishments ==
- HSBC Bank Middle East.
