= Mohammad Al-Buraiki =

Kuwaiti football Midfielder

Mohammad Al Buraiki
Personal information
- Date of birth: 10 July 1980 (age 46)
- Place of birth: Kuwait
- Position: Midfielder

Senior career*
Years	Team	Apps	(Gls)
1996–2008	Al Salmiya	-	(-)

International career
1998–2004	Kuwait	2	(0)
- * Club domestic league appearances and goals

Mohammad Al Buraiki is a Kuwaiti football midfielder who played for Kuwait in the 2004 Asian Cup. He also played for Al Salmiya.
