= 2012 in Kuwait =

- Decades: 1990s; 2000s; 2010s; 2020s
- See also: Other events of 2012; List of years in Kuwait; Timeline of Kuwaiti history

Events from the year 2012 in Kuwait.

== Incumbents ==
- Emir: Sabah Al-Ahmad Al-Jaber Al-Sabah
- Prime Minister: Jaber Al-Mubarak Al-Hamad Al-Sabah

== Events ==
- 2011–12 Kuwait Emir Cup
- Kuwaiti protests (2011–2012)

== See also ==
- Years in Jordan
- Years in Syria
