= 1982 in Kuwait =

- Decades: 1960s; 1970s; 1980s; 1990s; 2000s
- See also: Other events of 1982; List of years in Kuwait; Timeline of Kuwaiti history

Events from the year 1982 in Kuwait.

== Incumbents ==
- Emir: Jaber Al-Ahmad Al-Jaber Al-Sabah
- Prime Minister: Saad Al-Salim Al-Sabah

== Events ==
- Souk Al-Manakh stock market crash, late 1982

== Births ==
- 29 May – Saleh Al Sheikh
- 28 September – Nawaf Al-Mutairi
- 31 October – Ali Al Namash
