= 2014–15 Kuwait Emir Cup =

2014–15 Kuwaiti Emir Cup
Tournament details
- Country: Kuwait

Final positions
- Champions: Al-Qadsia
- Runners-up: Al-Salmiya

The Kuwait Emir Cup is the premier cup competition involving teams from the Kuwaiti Premier League and the Kuwaiti Division One league.

The 2014–15 edition was the 52nd to be held.
