= 2013 Kuwait Emir Cup =

Tournament details
- Country: Kuwait
- Teams: 14

Final positions
- Champions: Al-Qadsia SC
- Runners-up: Al-Jahra

Tournament statistics
- Matches played: 25
- Goals scored: 54 (2.16 per match)

The Kuwait Emir Cup is the premier cup competition involving teams from the Kuwaiti Premier League and the Kuwaiti Division One league.

The 2013 edition is the 50th to be held and has been moved back to its original place in the footballing calendar and played at the back end of the season.

Defending Emir Cup champions Al Qadsia and Kuwaiti Premier League runners up Al Kuwait received byes to the Quarter-Final round.

The winners qualify for the 2014 AFC Cup.

== Round one ==
Team 1	Agg.	Team 2	1st leg	2nd leg
Al Naser (Kuwait)	1–2	(Kuwait) Kazma	1–1	0–1
Al Jahra (Kuwait)	1–0	(Kuwait) Al Salmiya	1–0	0–0
Tadamon (Kuwait)	1–1; 4-5p	(Kuwait) Sulaibikhat	1–0	0–1
Al Arabi (Kuwait)	2–2 (a)	(Kuwait) Sahel	0–1	2–1
Khaitan (Kuwait)	3–6	(Kuwait) Al Fahaheel	1–4	2–2
Al Shabab (Kuwait)	0–3	(Kuwait) Al Yarmouk	0–1	0–2

== Quarter finals ==
Team 1	Agg.	Team 2	1st leg	2nd leg
Al Fahaheel (Kuwait)	2–10	(Kuwait) Al Arabi	2–6	0–4
Kazma (Kuwait)	4–1	(Kuwait) Sulaibikhat	1–0	3–1
Al Kuwait	1–1 (a)	(Kuwait) Al Jahra	1–1	0–0
Al Qadsia (Kuwait)	12–0	(Kuwait) Al Yarmouk	5–0	7–0

== Semi finals ==
Team 1	Agg.	Team 2	1st leg	2nd leg
Al Jahra (Kuwait)	1–0	(Kuwait) Kazma	0–0	1–0
Al Qadsia (Kuwait)	2–0	(Kuwait) Al Arabi	2–0	0–0

== Final ==
Team 1	Score	Team 2
Al Qadsia (Kuwait)	3–0	(Kuwait) Al Jahra
