= 2003 in Kuwait =

- Decades: 1980s; 1990s; 2000s; 2010s; 2020s
- See also: Other events of 2003; List of years in Kuwait; Timeline of Kuwaiti history

The following lists events that happened during 2003 in Kuwait.

== Incumbents ==
- Emir: Jaber Al-Ahmad Al-Jaber Al-Sabah
- Prime Minister: Saad Al-Salim Al-Sabah (until 13 July), Sabah Al-Ahmad Al-Jaber Al-Sabah (starting 13 July)

== Events ==
=== January ===
- January 20 - As part of the plan to invade Iraq, British defence secretary Geoff Hoon announces that 26,000 British troops and equipment including 120 tanks will be sent to Kuwait, joining the 5,000 troops already on their way there.

=== March ===
- March 8 - Kuwaiti workers have been instructed to make 35 holes in the fence between Iraq and Kuwait, and that the Kuwaiti army is positioning tanks at these openings. The Pakistan Daily Times reported that UNIKOM had found armed US Marines in the demilitarized zone along the fence last month. CBC reported that 230 UN support workers have been ordered out of the demilitarized zone.
