= 2011 in Kuwait =

- Decades: 1990s; 2000s; 2010s; 2020s
- See also: Other events of 2011; List of years in Kuwait; Timeline of Kuwaiti history

The following lists events that happened during 2011 in Kuwait.

== Incumbents ==
- Emir: Sabah Al-Ahmad Al-Jaber Al-Sabah
- Prime Minister: Nasser Al-Sabah (until 30 November), Jaber Al-Mubarak Al-Hamad Al-Sabah (starting 30 November)

== Events ==
=== January ===
- January 5 - Prime Minister Nasser Mohammed Al-Ahmed Al-Sabah narrowly survives a no confidence vote, following a crackdown at an opposition demonstration in December.

=== February ===
- February 18 - A thousand or more non-citizen residents of Kuwait demonstrated demanding rights given to Kuwaiti citizens.

=== March ===
- March 11 - Riot police fire tear gas at a demonstration of stateless Arabs demanding more rights.
- March 30 - Kuwait recalls its ambassador to Iran after it convicted three people on charges of spying for Iran.

=== August ===
- August 26 - Al Arabiya television reports that three rockets have hit the border area between Kuwait and Iraq.

=== November ===
- November 28 - Prime Minister Sheikh Nasser Mohammed Al-Ahmed Al-Sabah and his cabinet resign after protesters storm the national Parliament.
