= 2008 in Kuwait =

- Decades: 1980s; 1990s; 2000s; 2010s; 2020s
- See also: Other events of 2008; List of years in Kuwait; Timeline of Kuwaiti history

Events from the year 2008 in Kuwait.

== Incumbents ==
- Emir: Sabah Al-Ahmad Al-Jaber Al-Sabah
- Prime Minister: Nasser Al-Sabah

== Deaths ==
- May 13 - Saad Al-Abdullah Al-Salim Al-Sabah.

== Establishments ==
- Al-Watan Daily.
