= 1986 in Kuwait =

- Decades: 1960s; 1970s; 1980s; 1990s; 2000s
- See also: Other events of 1986; List of years in Kuwait; Timeline of Kuwaiti history

Events from the year 1986 in Kuwait.

== Incumbents ==
- Emir: Jaber Al-Ahmad Al-Jaber Al-Sabah
- Prime Minister: Saad Al-Salim Al-Sabah

== Events ==
- June - Saboteurs bomb three oil pipelines and the head of a high-pressure oil well, almost causing a shutdown of Kuwait's oil industry.
- 2 July - An assassination attempt is made against Emir Jaber Al-Ahmad Al-Sabah.
- 3 July - The Emir dissolves the National Assembly and suspended several articles of the constitution to rule by decree, citing a foreign conspiracy.
- 11 July - The 12th government of Kuwait resigned.
- 12 July - The Emir issues a decree for the formation of a 13th government.
- 27 November - Kuwait Stock Exchange inaugurated the main trading hall.

== Sports ==
- Kazma SC win the Kuwait Premier League.

== Births ==
- 8 October - Hamad Al-Enezi.
- 11 December - Ali Maqseed.
