= 1988 in Kuwait =

- Decades: 1960s; 1970s; 1980s; 1990s; 2000s
- See also: Other events of 1988; List of years in Kuwait; Timeline of Kuwaiti history

Events from the year 1988 in Kuwait.

== Incumbents ==
- Emir: Jaber Al-Ahmad Al-Jaber Al-Sabah
- Prime Minister: Saad Al-Salim Al-Sabah

== Births ==
- 21 April - Amer Al Fadhel
- 18 June - Abdullah Al Shemali
- 1 September - Fahad Al Enezi
- 19 October - Aziz Mashaan
