= 2017 Kuwait Emir Cup final =

2016-17 Kuwait Emir Cup final
Kazma SC	Kuwait SC
2	4
- Date: 21 February 2017
- Venue: Jaber Al-Ahmad International Stadium, Al-Ahmidi
- Attendance: 27,329

The final of 2016–17 Kuwait Emir Cup.

== Details ==
21 February 2017
19:00 (UTC+3)

Kazma SC (Kuwait)	2 – 4	Kuwait SC
Nasser Al-Wuhaib 39'; Patrick Fabiano 84'	Report	Abdullah Al Buraiki 41'; Juma Saeed 45'; Kemara 62'; Hadad 73'

Jaber International Stadium, Kuwait City
Attendance: 28,604
