= 1985 Kuwaiti general election =

General elections were held in Kuwait on 21 February 1985. A total of 231 candidates contested the election, which saw pro-government candidates remain the largest bloc in Parliament. Voter turnout was 85.1%.

== Results ==
Party	Votes	%	Seats	+/–
Pro-government candidates			27	–1
Independents			9	+1
Sunni Islamist			7	0
Secular opposition			4	+1
Shi'ite Islamist			3	–1
Total			50	0
Total votes	48,368	–		
Registered voters/turnout	56,848	85.08		
Source: Nohlen et al.
