= 2013–14 Kuwaiti Federation Cup =

Tournament details
- Country: Kuwait

Final positions
- Champions: Al-Arabi
- Runners-up: Al-Salmiya

Champions: Al-Arabi SC

Al-Arabi SC beats Al-Salmiya SC 4-2 on penalty kicks after the game ended with a draw of 2-2 until extra time.

Al-Arabi SC got second place in there group after khaitan SC in first place.

Al-Kuwait SC got 1st place in there group and in 2nd place was Al-Salmiya SC.

== Semi-finals ==
Al-Arabi SC went to face Al-Kuwait SC which they drew on the first leg 0-0 and Al-Arabi SC won the 2nd leg 2-1 so they can qualify to the final.

Al-Salmiya SC faced khaitan SC in the other semi-final match which Al-Salmiya SC won 4-1 in the 1st leg and won the 2nd leg 3-1.

== Final ==
Al-Arabi SC beats Al-Salmiya SC 4-2 on penalty kicks after the game ended with a draw of 2-2 until extra time.
