= Talal Al Fadhel =

Kuwaiti footballer

Personal information
- Full name: Talal Al Fadhel
- Date of birth: 11 August 1990 (age 36)
- Place of birth: Kuwait City, Kuwait
- Position: Midfielder

Team information
- Current team: Al-Qadsia
- Number: 31

Youth career
- 2004–2012: Kazma

Senior career*
Years	Team	Apps	(Gls)
2009–2017	Kazma		
2017	Saham		
2017–2025	Kuwait SC		
2025–	Qadsia SC		

International career
2013–	Kuwait	16	(0)
- * Club domestic league appearances and goals

Talal Al Fadhel (born 11 August 1990) is a Kuwaiti footballer who plays for Al-Qadsia as a midfielder.
