= 2017 Kuwait Emir Cup =

2016–17 Kuwait Emir Cup
Tournament details
- Country: Kuwait
- Teams: 15

Final positions
- Champions: Kuwait SC (12th title)
- Runners-up: Kazma SC

Tournament statistics
- Matches played: 50
- Goals scored: 148 (2.96 per match)

The 2016–17 Kuwait Emir Cup will be the 55th edition and will consist of 2 groups top 2 of each group advanced to the finals.

Kuwait SC are the defending champions.

== Group-Stage ==
=== Group A ===
Team	Pld	W	D	L	GF	GA	GD	Pts
(Kuwait) Kazma SC	6	5	0	1	10	5	+5	15
Kuwait SC	6	4	0	2	13	5	+8	12
(Kuwait) Al-Salmiya SC	6	3	1	2	9	8	+1	10
(Kuwait) Al-Arabi SC	6	3	1	2	10	11	−1	10
(Kuwait) Al-Nasr SC	6	3	0	3	8	8	0	9
(Kuwait) Al-Shabab SC	6	2	0	4	9	11	−2	6
(Kuwait) Al-Fahaheel FC	6	0	0	6	4	13	−9	0

=== Group B ===
Team	Pld	W	D	L	GF	GA	GD	Pts
(Kuwait) Qadsia SC	7	6	1	0	14	2	+12	19
(Kuwait) Al Tadhamon SC	7	5	1	1	17	7	+10	16
(Kuwait) Al-Sulaibikhat SC	7	4	0	3	7	9	−2	12
(Kuwait) Al-Jahra SC	7	3	0	4	12	10	+2	9
(Kuwait) Al-Yarmouk SC	7	2	2	3	7	12	−5	8
(Kuwait) Khaitan SC	7	1	3	3	5	6	−1	6
(Kuwait) Burgan SC	7	1	2	4	8	20	−12	5
(Kuwait) Al-Sahel SC	7	1	1	5	10	12	−2	4

== Knockouts ==
=== Bracket ===
Semi-Finals
H	Kazma SC	1
A	Al-Tadhamon SC	0
A	Kuwait SC	1
H	Qadsia SC	0

Final
H	Kazma SC	2
A	Kuwait SC	4

=== Semi-finals ===
15-2-2017	Kazma SC (Kuwait)	1–0	Al-Tadhamon SC (Kuwait)

14-2-2017	Kuwait SC	1–0	Qadsia SC (Kuwait)

=== Final ===
21-2-2017	Kazma SC (Kuwait)	2–4	Kuwait SC	Jaber Al-Ahmad International Stadium
Final				Referee: Saad Al-Fadhli
