= Ahmad Al-Saleh =

Kuwaiti actor (1938–2015)

Ahmad Al-Saleh أحمد الصالح
- Born: February 13, 1938; Kuwait
- Died: April 11, 2015 (aged 77); United States
- Occupation: Actor
- Years active: 1961–2015

Ahmad Al-Saleh (Arabic:أحمد الصالح) (February 13, 1938 - April 11, 2015), was a Kuwaiti actor whose acting career spanned more than 54 years.

== Works ==
=== Plays ===
- Rznamah (1970)
- Saboha (1983)

=== Television series ===
- Hababah (1976)
- Bo Marzoq (1992)
- Al Sarayat (2000)
- Lahob (2008)

=== Films ===
- Bas Ya Bahar (1972)
- Al Sammt (1976)

== Death ==
Al-Saleh died on April 11, 2015, at a hospital in the United States. He was buried in Kuwait four days later.
