= 2010 Kuwait Emir Cup =

Tournament details
- Country: Kuwait
- Dates: 26 March – 17 May 2010
- Teams: 13

Final positions
- Champions: Qadsia (13th title)
- Runners-up: Kuwait
- Semifinalists: Al-Arabi; Kazma

Tournament statistics
- Matches played: 13
- Goals scored: 42 (3.23 per match)

The Kuwaiti Emir Cup is the premier cup competition involving teams from the Kuwaiti Premier League and the Kuwaiti Division One league.

The 2010 edition is the 47th to be held.

Kuwait SC, are the defending champions of the cup competition.

The winners qualify for the 2011 AFC Cup.

== First round ==
12 teams play a knockout tie. 6 clubs advance to the next round. Games played between 26 and 27 March.

Tie no	Home team	Score	Away team
1	Al Jahra	1 – 5	Al Yarmouk
2	Sulaibikhat	1 - 2	Al Fahaheel
3	Khaitan	0 - 2	Al Salmiya
4	Al Arabi	6 - 0	Tadamon
5	Sahel	1 - 1	Kazma
Kazma won 4 - 2 on penalties
6	Al Naser	2 - 1	Al Shabab

== Quarter finals ==
Tie no	Home team	Score	Away team
1	Al Qadisiya Kuwait	2 - 0	Al Yarmouk
2	Al Arabi	2 - 1	Al Salmiya
3	Kuwait SC	1 - 0	Al Naser
4	Kazma	5 - 2	Al Fahaheel

== Semi finals ==
Tie no	Home team	Score	Away team
1	Al Qadisiya Kuwait	4 - 1	Al Arabi
2	Kuwait SC	1 - 1 (4-3 pens)	Kazma

== Final ==
Tie no	Home team	Score	Away team
1	Al Qadisiya Kuwait	0 - 0 (4-1 pens)	Kuwait SC
