= Nabil Al Fadl =

Kuwaiti politician

Nabil Al Fadl نبيل الفضل
- Born: Nabil Nuri Al Fadl; 1949; Kuwait
- Died: December 22, 2015 (aged 66); Kuwait
- Occupation(s): Writer and politician

Nabil Al Fadl (1949 – December 22, 2015) was a Kuwaiti politician who was a member of the Kuwaiti National Assembly and a columnist with the Al-Watan newspaper.

== His writings ==
Fadl often harshly criticized fellow members of the National Assembly of Kuwait, especially Ahmad Al-Saadoun, Musallam Al-Barrak and Faisal Al-Muslim Al-Otaibi.

== Death ==
He died on December 22, 2015, during a session of the National Assembly, where he fell unconscious. Efforts to revive him were unsuccessful, and led to the suspension of the meeting and the evacuation of the hall from the public and the media.
