= Ali Al Shamali =

Kuwaiti footballer

Personal information
- Full name: Ali Hayder Al Shamali
- Date of birth: August 17, 1983 (age 43)
- Place of birth: Kuwait City, Kuwait
- Height: 1.67 m (5 ft 6 in)
- Position: Midfielder

Youth career
- 1997–2000: Al Qadsia

Senior career*
Years	Team	Apps	(Gls)
2000–2011	Al Qadsia		
2012–2014	Al-Fahaheel FC		
2014–2015	Al-Nasr Ardiya		

International career
2003–2007	Kuwait	13	(1)
- * Club domestic league appearances and goals

Ali Hayder Al Shamali (Arabic: علي حيدر الشمالي, born 17 August 1983) is a Kuwaiti former footballer who played as a midfielder for the Kuwaiti Premier League club Al Qadsia.
