= Al-Mulla Group =

Kuwaiti business group

Al Mulla Group Holding Co.
- Company type: Joint Stock Holding Co.
- Industry: Diversified conglomerate
- Founded: Kuwait 1938
- Founder: Abdullah Saleh Al Mulla
- Headquarters: Kuwait City, Kuwait
- Key people: Anwar Abdulla Al Mulla (Chairman) Talal Anwar Al Mulla (Group CEO)
- Products: Automotive, Financial Services, Engineering, Manufacturing, Trading, Investments, Real Estate, Healthcare, Education
- Website: www.almullagroup.com

Al Mulla Group is a diversified privately held business group based in the State of Kuwait with operations in 8 countries. With over 15,000 employees working in more than 40+ companies, Al Mulla Group today has affiliations with over 200 leading international brands and companies.

== History ==
Established in 1938 by then Secretary of State Abdullah Saleh Al Mulla, the Group started out when the late Mr. Al Mulla set up an electrical and domestic appliance store, soon acquiring the GEC franchise from the United Kingdom. In 1947, the Bader Al Mulla and Brothers Company was created and later acquired the rights to distribute Chrysler Middle East, Plymouth and Dodge Middle East vehicles in Kuwait. Expansion followed into areas of marine products, HVAC contracting, travel and industrial equipment distribution.

Starting in 2003, the Group expanded into several new areas, which today are leaders in each of their fields. These include the money exchange, healthcare and education sectors, while the other core areas of Automotive and Engineering continued to grow significantly in size and market share.

In 2018, Daimler AG, the owner of the Mercedes-Benz brand, selected Al Mulla Group as its new sole distributor in Kuwait for both Passenger Cars and Trucks and Buses. Al Mulla Group, through its fully owned subsidiary/

In December 2019, Al Mulla Group sealed a deal with XCMG, the largest manufacturer of construction machinery in China, to be its sole distributor in Kuwait.

== History ==
Following the founder's death in 1955, his eldest son Bader became chairman until 1969, with his brothers Najeeb and Anwar becoming his successors; Najeeb as Chairman, and Anwar as Deputy Chairman & CEO. Three years later, the Maseelah Trading Company was founded in 1972. Maseelah Trading acquired the distribution rights for Mitsubishi Motor Vehicles in Kuwait, leading to dramatic growth in the group's automotive business.

In 1978, radical changes were made to the company: A multinational board was appointed, instead of a board of only family members. The Group entered additional businesses such as environmental systems, vehicle rental and leasing, fire protection, office equipment, security services, engineering products, consumer appliances and insurance consultancy.

== Subsidiaries/Associates/Affiliates/Investments ==
| Name | Country |
|---|---|
| Bader Al Mulla & Bros. Company S.P.C. | Kuwait |
| Maseelah Trading Company S.P.C. | Kuwait |
| Al Mulla National General Trading Company | Kuwait |
| Al Mulla Re-Insurance Broking Company | Kuwait |
| Al Mulla Travel Bureau | Kuwait |
| Al Mulla Rental & Leasing Company K.S.C.C. | Kuwait |
| Al Mulla International Exchange Company K.S.C.C. | Kuwait |
| Al Mulla Cleaning & Maintenance Services Company W.L.L. | Kuwait |
| Al Mulla Environmental Systems W.L.L. | Kuwait |
| AMG Steel & Systems Company PVT LTD. | India |
| Al Mulla General Trading for Safety, Security & Fire Systems & Equipment Company | Kuwait |
| Al Mazayah Al Oulah Trading Company L.L.C. | (United Arab Emirates) UAE |
| Al Mazayah Al Thaniyah Trading Company L.L.C. | (United Arab Emirates) UAE |
| Modern Exchange Company | Oman |
| Al Mulla & Behbehani Motors Company W.L.L. | Kuwait |
| Al Mulla Security Services Company | Kuwait |
| G4S Kuwait | Kuwait |
| Nasser Bin Khaled & Al Mulla Cars Rent Co. W.L.L. | Qatar |
| Al Soor International Holding Company K.S.C.C. | Kuwait |
| Khadamat Marketing Services Company | Kuwait |
| SAMA Medical Services Company | Kuwait |
| Diamond International Motors | Egypt |
| Iraq International Import, Export & Commission Agent Company | Iraq |
| Kuwait College of Science & Technology | Kuwait |
| Al Mulla Industries | Kuwait |
| Al Mulla International Motors | Kuwait |
| Al Mulla International General Trading for Furniture & Office Equipment Company | Kuwait |
| National Takaful Insurance Company K.S.C.C. | Kuwait |
| Al Mulla International Real Estate Development Company | Kuwait |
| Al Mulla Automobiles For Buying & Selling Cars | Kuwait |
| Al Mulla National Contracting Company | Kuwait |
| Al Mulla International Financing Company K.S.C.C. | Kuwait |
| Diamond Motors Company | Egypt |
| Al Mulla Automobiles Co. | Kuwait |
