= Abdullah Saleh Al Mulla =

Kuwaiti diplomat (died 1955)

- Occupation: Former Secretary of State in Kuwait

Abdullah Saleh Al Mulla MBE (died 1955) was Secretary of State in Kuwait under the Emirs Sheikh Ahmad Al-Jaber Al-Sabah and Sheikh Abdullah III Al-Salim Al-Sabah. He was one of the first Kuwaitis to be educated in Britain during the early 1900s, and the country's first Secretary of State that was able to directly deal with the Western world during a pivotal period of Kuwait's history, the discovery of oil. During his tenure as Secretary of State, and given his fluency in the English language, he acted on behalf of the Emir in discussions with major international oil companies to start exploration and drilling for oil in Kuwait. He was instrumental in negotiating terms between the Kuwaiti government and the companies, which eventually led to the first oil wells in Kuwait. He was also the first to recommend and negotiate on behalf of the Kuwaiti government for the installation and commissioning of Kuwait's first desalination plant located in Shuwaikh, as well as the first to coordinate the commissioning of Kuwait's first major power station. In 1938 Al Mulla and a business partner opened a store for electrical appliances in downtown Kuwait City. This later became Al Mulla Group.

In recognition of his efforts in strengthening bilateral relations between Kuwait and the United Kingdom, he was recognized as a recipient of the Most Excellent Order of the British Empire (MBE) by Queen Elizabeth II in 1953, and was also awarded a Queen Elizabeth II Coronation Medal.

He died in 1955.
