= 2009 Kuwait Emir Cup =

Tournament details
- Country: Kuwait
- Dates: 18 May – 24 November 2009
- Teams: 13

Final positions
- Champions: Kuwait (9th title)
- Runners-up: Al-Arabi
- Semifinalists: Qadsia; Al-Nasr

Tournament statistics
- Matches played: 13
- Goals scored: 39 (3 per match)

The Kuwaiti Emir Cup is an end of season cup competition involving teams from the Kuwaiti Premier League and the Kuwaiti Division One league.

The 2009 edition is the 46th to be held.

Al Arabi Kuwait is the current holders of the cup.

The winners qualify for the 2010 AFC Cup

== First round ==
12 teams play a knockout tie. 6 clubs advance to the next round. Games played between 18 May and 21 May.

Tie no	Home team	Score	Away team
1	Sahel	2–1	Al Salmiya
2	Al Qadisiya Kuwait	7–0	Al Fahaheel
3	Khaitan	0–1	Kazma
4	Al Shabab	3–2	Al Jahra
5	Tadamon	3–3	Sulaibikhat
Tadamon won 6 – 5 on penalties
6	Al Naser	2–0	Al Yarmouk

== Quarter finals ==
Tie no	Home team	Score	Away team
1	Tadamon	0–1	Al Naser
2	Al Qadisiya Kuwait	3–2	Kazma
3	Kuwait SC	2–1	Sahel
4	Al Arabi	1–1	Al Shabab
Al Arabi won 5 – 4 on penalties

== Semi finals ==
Tie no	Home team	Score	Away team
1	Kuwait SC	1–0	Al Qadisiya Kuwait
2	Al Arabi	0–0	Al Naser
Al Arabi won 2 – 1 on penalties

== Final ==
Tie no	Home team	Score	Away team
1	Al Arabi	1–2	Kuwait SC
