= Kuwait Emir Cup =

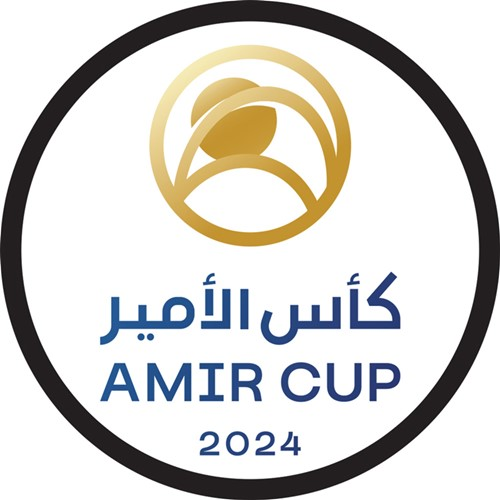
- Organising body: Kuwait FA
- Founded: 1962
- Country: Kuwait
- Region: AFC
- Number of clubs: 18
- Current champions: Kuwait (17th Title) (2025)
- Most championships: Kuwait (17 titles)
- Current: 2025-26 Kuwait Emir Cup

The Kuwait Amir/Emir Cup (Arabic: كأس أمير الكويت) is a Kuwaiti football competition created in 1962. The Emir Cup is the last football competition in the Kuwaiti football season calendar.

Al-Arabi hold the record of being the only team to reach the final 11 consecutive times, from 1962 up to 1972.

== Results ==
The teams who also won the Kuwaiti Premier League are listed in green.

Year	Champion	Result	Runner-up
1962	Al-Arabi	7–1	Qadsia
1963	Al-Arabi	1–0	Kuwait
1964	Al-Arabi	2–1	Qadsia
1965	Qadsia	3–1	Al-Arabi
1966	Al-Arabi	2–0	Al-Salmiya
1967	Qadsia	4–2	Al-Arabi
1968	Qadsia	2–1	Al-Arabi
1969	Al-Arabi	2–1	Kuwait
1970	Yarmouk	2–1	Al-Arabi
1971	Al-Arabi	2–1	Kuwait
1972	Qadsia	2–1	Al-Arabi
1973	Yarmouk	0–0 _{(aet, 4–2 pens)}	Al-Salmiya
1974	Qadsia	1–0	Al-Arabi
1975	Qadsia	2–1	Kuwait
1976	Kuwait	1–0	Qadsia
1977	Kuwait	2–1	Qadsia
1978	Kuwait	4–1	Al-Salmiya
1979	Qadsia	2–1	Kazma
1980	Kuwait	3–2	Kazma
1981	Al-Arabi	1–0	Kuwait
1982	Kazma	6–1	Kuwait
1983	Al-Arabi	2–1	Kazma
1984	Kazma	2–0	Al-Tadhamon
1985	Kuwait	2–2 _{(aet, 4–2 pens)}	Kazma
1986	Fahaheel	3–0	Kazma
1987	Kuwait	4–2	Al-Tadhamon
1988	Kuwait	1–0	Kazma
1989	Kuwait	2–1	Al-Arabi
1990	Kazma	1–1 _{(aet, 4–2 pens)}	Al-Arabi
1991	Suspended due to Gulf War		
1992	Al-Arabi	1–1 _{(aet, 3–2 pens)}	Qadsia
1993	Al-Salmiya	5–0	Yarmouk
1994	Qadsia	2–0	Al-Tadhamon
1995	Kazma	1–0	Al-Arabi
1996	Al-Arabi	2–1	Al-Jahra
1997	Kazma	2–0	Qadsia
1998	Kazma	3–1	Al-Arabi
1999	Al-Arabi	2–1	Al-Sahel
2000	Al-Arabi	2–1	Al-Tadhamon
2001	Al-Salmiya	3–1	Kazma
2002	Kuwait	1–0	Al-Jahra
2003	Qadsia	2–2 _{(aet, 4–1 pens)}	Al-Salmiya
2004	Qadsia	2–0	Kuwait
2005	Al-Arabi	1–1 _{(aet, 6–5 pens)}	Kazma
2006	Al-Arabi	2–0	Qadsia
2007	Qadsia	5–0	Al-Salmiya
2008	Al-Arabi	2–1 _{(aet)}	Al-Salmiya
2009	Kuwait	2–1	Al-Arabi
2010	Qadsia	0–0 _{(aet, 4–1 pens)}	Kuwait
2011	Kazma	1–0	Kuwait
2012	Qadsia	1–0	Kazma
2013	Qadsia	3–0	Al-Jahra
2014	Kuwait	1–1 _{(aet, 4–3 pens)}	Qadsia
2015	Qadsia	1–0	Al-Salmiya
2016	Kuwait	3–1	Al-Arabi
2017	Kuwait	4–2	Kazma
2018	Kuwait	3–0	Al-Arabi
2019	Kuwait	2–0	Qadsia
2020	Al-Arabi	2–1	Kuwait
2021	Kuwait	1–0	Qadsia
2022	Kazma	2–1	Al-Salmiya
2023	Kuwait	3–0 (a.e.t.)	Kazma
2024	Qadsia	1–0	Al-Salmiya
2025	Kuwait	2–0	Al-Arabi
2026			

== Performance by team ==
Team	Winners	Year(s) won
Kuwait	17	1975–76, 1976–77, 1977–78, 1979–80, 1984–85, 1986–87, 1987–88, 2001–02, 2008–09, 2013–14, 2015–16, 2016–17, 2017–18, 2018–19, 2020–21, 2022–23, 2024-25
Qadsia	17	1964–65, 1966–67, 1967–68, 1971–72, 1973–74, 1974–75, 1978–79, 1988–89, 1993–94, 2002–03, 2003–04, 2006–07, 2009–10, 2011–12, 2013, 2014–15, 2023–24
Al-Arabi	16	1961–62, 1962–63, 1963–64, 1965–66, 1968–69, 1970–71, 1980–81, 1982–83, 1991–92, 1995–96, 1998–99, 1999–00, 2004–05, 2005–06, 2007–08, 2019–20
Kazma	8	1981–82, 1983–84, 1989–90, 1994–95, 1996–97, 1997–98, 2010–11, 2021-22
Al-Salmiya	2	1992–93, 2000–01
Yarmouk	2	1969–70, 1972–73
Fahaheel	1	1985–86

== See also ==
- Kuwait Premier League
- Kuwait Division One
- Kuwait Crown Prince Cup
- Kuwait Super Cup
