= Fast Telecommunications =

Internet service provider in Kuwait

Fast Telecommunication Co. W.L.L. - FASTtelco
- Company type: Shareholding company
- Industry: Internet & Communications
- Founded: 2001; 25 years ago
- Headquarters: Kuwait City, Kuwait
- Products: Internet service
- Website: fasttelco.net

Fast Telecommunication Co. W.L.L. is an internet service provider in Kuwait, established in 2001. Owned by the Kuwaiti Shareholding Company, FAST Telco specializes in providing Internet, local and international data communication, as well as local and international termination services for foreign carriers. It currently operates a network based on SDH/ATM/IP technologies.
