= Gulfsat =

- Company type: Private
- Industry: Satellite service
- Founded: 1995
- Headquarters: Kuwait City
- Website: http://www.gulfsat.com 29°22′36″N 47°59′15″E

Gulfsat provides satellite communications solutions in the state of Kuwait. It was established in 1995 with the partnership of the Kuwait Ministry of Communications and Hughes Network Systems. Gulfsat is a member of KIPCO Group, the region's leading investment group.

== Company history ==
Gulfsat started in 1995 by leasing ministry of communication uplink facility in Um Al-Hayman. In 2002 Gulfsat started expanding its operations by investing in building two worldwide hubs in the United States and Germany currently not operationally. Gulfsat owns and operates its own communications infrastructure through leasing satellite capacity from AM-44 satellite Russian satellite owned by RISCC, thus maintaining long-term partnerships with its customers. Gulfsat is not the only licensed satellite service provider in the State of Kuwait.
