= 2013–14 Kuwait Emir Cup =

2013–14 Kuwaiti Emir Cup
Tournament details
- Country: Kuwait

Final positions
- Champions: Al-Kuwait
- Runners-up: Al-Qadsia

The Kuwait Emir Cup is the premier cup competition involving teams from the Kuwaiti Premier League and the Kuwaiti Division One league.

The 2013–14 edition is the 51st to be held.

The winners qualify for the 2015 AFC Cup.
