= Kuwait Air Force =

Air warfare branch of Kuwait's armed forces

- القوات الجوية الكويتية; al-Quwwat al-Jawwiya al-Kuwaitiya
- Emblem of the Kuwait Air Force
- Founded: 1953
- Country: Kuwait
- Type: Air force
- Role: Aerial warfare
- Size: 2,500 personnel; 137 aircraft
- Part of: Kuwait Military Forces
- Garrison/HQ: Abdullah Al-Mubarak Air Base
- Mottos: الله والوطن الامير; "God, Country, and Emir"
- Anniversaries: 25/26 February (National and Liberation Day)
- Engagements: Operation Vantage; 1973 Samita border skirmish; Invasion of Kuwait; Operation Desert Storm; War on terror; War in Afghanistan; War in Iraq; Syrian civil war; 2015 military intervention in Yemen; 2026 Iran War

Commanders
- Chief of the General Staff: Lieutenant general Mohammed Khaled Al-Khadher

Insignia
- Roundel

- Fin flash

- Flag

Aircraft flown
- Fighter: F/A-18 Hornet, F/A-18 Super Hornet, Eurofighter Typhoon
- Helicopter: Boeing AH-64 Apache, Aerospatiale Gazelle
- Interceptor: F/A-18 Hornet, Eurofighter Typhoon
- Trainer: Short Tucano, BAE Hawk
- Transport: Boeing C-17 Globemaster III, Lockheed L-100 Hercules, Eurocopter AS332 Super Puma, C-130
- Tanker: KC-130J

The Kuwait Air Force (Arabic: القوات الجوية الكويتية, romanized: al-Quwwat al-Jawwiya al-Kuwaitiya) is the air arm of the Armed Forces of Kuwait. The Air Force headquarters is located at Abdullah Al-Mubarak Air Base, with the remaining forces stationed at Air Defense Brigades, Ali Al Salem Air Base and Ahmad al-Jaber Air Base. The Kuwait Air Force numbers approximately 2,500 officers and enlisted personnel.

== History ==
The Kuwait Air Force was founded in 1953 by Field Marshal Sheikh Abdullah Mubarak Al-Sabah when the Directorate of Public Security Force split from the Kuwaiti Army; the new force was equipped with a number of Austers in different configurations and two de Havilland DH.104 Doves.

The Kuwait Air Force was expanded concurrently with the course of the British intervention during Operation Vantage that deterred Iraq from annexing Kuwait as one of its provinces. The first aircraft to enter KAF service were four Whirlwind helicopters and six BAC/Hunting Jet Provost T.51s. This support from the UK would remain in place for a long time and 1964 was known for the arrival of the first Hawker Hunters. These would later be joined by more examples in 1969. Two de Havilland Canada DHC-4 Caribou transports arrived in 1963. The transport capacity would later be improved by the acquisition of an ex-RAF Armstrong Whitworth AW.660 Argosy in 1969 and later, in 1971, by two Lockheed L-100-20 Hercules.

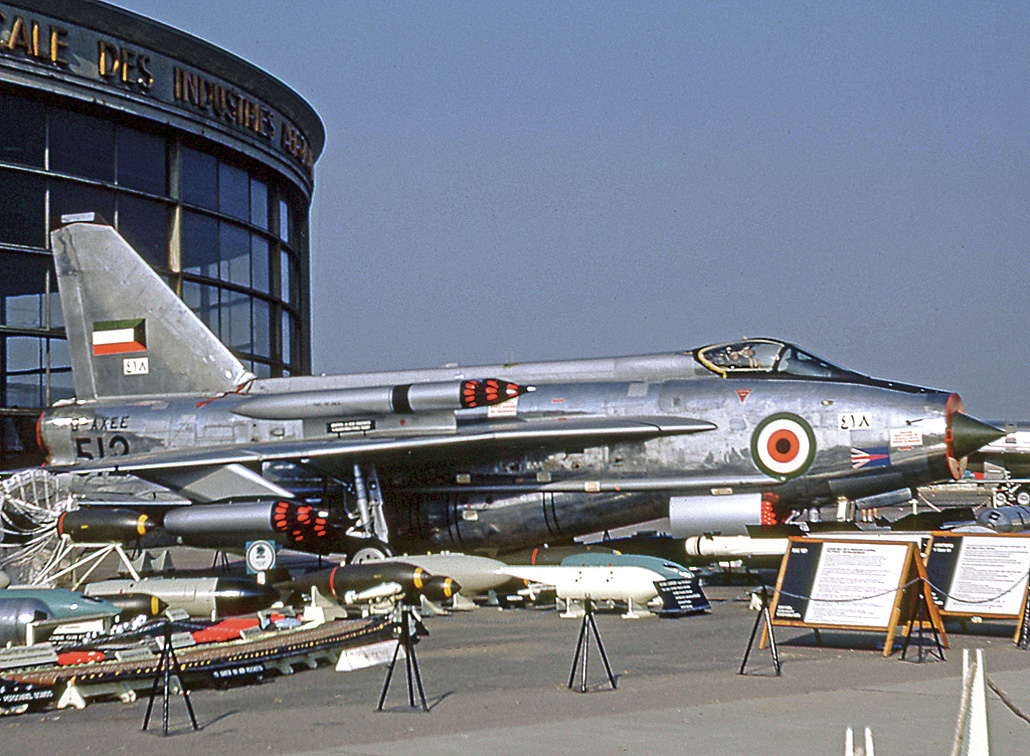
Kuwait Air Force English Electric Lightning F.53 before delivery in June 1969

In the meantime the fighter force was given a boost by the procurement of 14 English Electric Lightnings that were delivered in the late 1960s. Twelve BAC Strikemasters were delivered in 1969.

Between 1968 and 1977 two Bell 206s operated in KAF service and from November 1969, eight Augusta Bell 205s were delivered, replacing the aging Whirlwinds. Only five years after the delivery of the Lightnings, the KAF decided it needed an aircraft with better serviceability; it had been using the Hunters and the Strikemasters in the interceptor and ground strike role, rather than the Lightnings. Finally in 1974 the Mirage F1 was selected as the new air defence fighter and a total of 27 Mirage F1CKs and seven Mirage F1BKs were ordered and delivered in two separate batches until 1983. The ground strike role would be filled in by the total of 36 Douglas (T)A-4KU Skyhawks that were ordered in 1974 and delivered during 1977. In addition, 24 SNIAS SA-342K Gazelles were delivered during the mid-1970s and 4 were subsequently passed on to the Police Air Wing. Four L-100-30 Hercules transport aircraft were delivered in 1983, replacing the shorter L-100-20 version of which only one survived (the other crashed in France). Also in 1983, twelve Hawk T64s were ordered to fill the gap that the KAF had in training capacity. In 1988 the Air Force was named al-Quwwat al-Jawwiya al-Kuwaitiya (Kuwait Air Force). The lead-in-fighter-trainer that was selected, the Shorts Tucano T.52, would only be delivered in 1995. They were earmarked for delivery in 1990 but due to the outbreak of the Gulf War, deliveries were postponed.

=== Kuwaiti inventory in 1991 ===
Kuwaiti Air Force and Air Defenses 1991
| Name | Origin | Type | In service |
Combat aircraft
| Mirage F1 | France | Multirole | 20 |
| English Electric Lightning | United Kingdom | Fighter-bomber | 12 |
| Hunter FGA.57 | United Kingdom | Fighter-bomber | 12 |
| A-4KU Skyhawk | United States | Attack | 24 |
Trainer aircraft
| Mirage F1BK | France | Trainer | 4 |
| TA-4KU Skyhawk | United States | Trainer | 3 |
| Hawk MK64 | United Kingdom | Trainer | 12 |
Transport
| L-100-30 Hercules | United States | Cargo | 4 |
| DHC-4 Caribou | Canada | Cargo | 2 |
| C-9K | United States | Airliner | 2 |
Helicopters
| SA-342 Gazelle w/ HOT | France; United Kingdom; Yugoslavia | Armed / Utility | 17 |
| AS332 Super Puma | France; Europe | Utility | 6 |
| SA-330 Puma | France | Utility | 10 |
Air Defenses
| Improved HAWK | United States | SAM | Battalion |
| Aerostat AN/TPS-63 Radar | United States | Tactical radar | 1 |

The delay in Iraqi air attacks allowed the Kuwaiti planes to get airborne. Kuwaiti A-4 attacked Republican Guard divisions still moving toward Kuwait City.

The initial Iraqi attack on al-Jaber closed the runways due to presence of air scattered mines. The returning Mirage F-1 and A-4 landed and were serviced on the perimeter fence road. Only when Iraqi troops were right next to the base did attack sorties stop.

Coalition forces heavily bombed the two Kuwait air bases, reducing most of the facilities to rubble and destroying nearly all of the 50 hardened aircraft shelters. Coalition cluster bombs cratered the taxiways and the Iraqis had run a ripper across the runways every 200 feet to make them unusable.

=== Post Gulf War ===
In the immediate post-war air force staff was 1,000, with 34 combat aircraft and 12 armed helicopters. In two years staff numbered about 2,500, with 74 combat aircraft, including A-4 Skyhawks, McDonnell Douglas F/A-18 Hornets, and 20 armed helicopters. Four batteries of I-Hawk medium-range SAMs and most of the fleet of transport aircraft had been impounded by Iraq

After the Gulf War, the KAF underwent a reorganization, growing in quantity and quality:

- Douglas A-4 Skyhawks and Dassault Mirage F1s were soon phased out in favour of the McDonnell Douglas F/A-18 Hornet. Forty Hornets, 32 F/A-18Cs and 8 F/A-18Ds, ordered before the Iraqi invasion, joined 9th Squadron and 25th Squadron from Ahmad al-Jaber.
- The first six of sixteen AH-64D Apache Longbow attack helicopters were handed over to the Kuwait Air Force on 3 February 2006. The remaining ten aircraft were delivered thereafter. All the helicopters are pre-configured to carry the AN/APG-78 Longbow radar kits.
- Six Patriot antiballistic missile SAM firing units and six batteries of Hawk SAMs were purchased.
- Air force engaged in extensive joint training with allies.

=== Purchase programs ===
==== Tanker and cargo plane programs ====
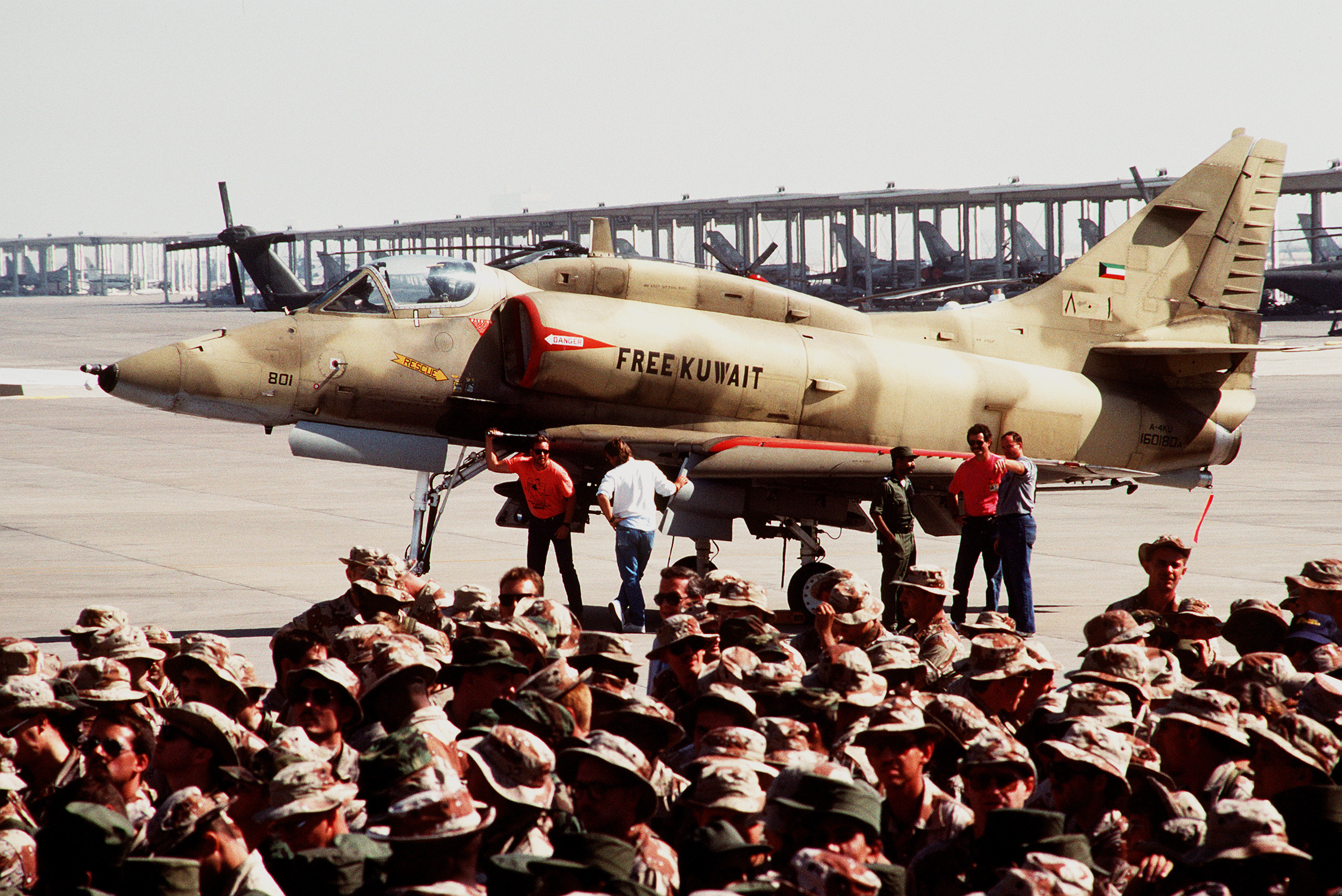
A A-4KU Skyhawk In use by the Free Kuwait Air Force

Lockheed Martin has received a $245 million contract from the U.S. Government for the Foreign Military Sale of 3 KC-130J tanker aircraft to Kuwait with an option for 3 more. The program will be managed by the U.S. Navy. The Kuwait Air Force's new KC-130Js will provide aerial refueling for its F/A-18 fleet and augment its current airlift fleet of three Lockheed Martin L-100s. Kuwait's KC-130Js also will perform air mobility, disaster relief and humanitarian missions throughout the world. Kuwait's first KC-130J delivery is scheduled for late 2013, with deliveries completed in early 2014. Using only wing and external tanks. In September 2010, Kuwait requested to purchase one Boeing C-17 followed shortly with an order for one more.

==== Air Defense program ====
The U.S. approved the foreign sale of (PAC-3) missiles, 20 launching stations, four radar systems and control stations, personnel training and training equipment, and spare parts to Kuwait in a deal worth an estimated $4.2 billion, The U.S. Department of Defense awarded Raytheon a $655.4 million, took the form of a firm-fixed-price, sole-source, foreign military sales contract to supply to the Kuwaiti military two PATRIOT fire units, plus associated spare parts. Delivery of the units is expected to take place by April 30, 2018, on June 23, 2016 Raytheon was awarded a $523 million fixed-price-incentive contract to modernize six Patriot fire units in Kuwait, the Defense Department spokesman said.

==== Transport and attack helicopter programs ====
Kuwait purchased 16 AH-64D Apache Longbow attack helicopters and 30 EC725 Caracal transport helicopters, 24 for the Air Force and 6 for the National Guard. The purchase is motivated by concerns about potential terrorist or foreign attacks. EC725 Caracal fleet will be used for combat search-and-rescue, naval operations, medical evacuation and military transportation and will be operated by the Kuwait Air Force and National Guard.

==== New combat fighters ====
On September 12, 2015, the Eurofighter consortium revealed that the Eurofighter Typhoon had been selected by Kuwait to update its fleet with 28 new fighter jets. In September 2016, it was also announced that the sale of up to 40 Boeing F/A-18E/F Super Hornet had been submitted to the US Congress for approval. A deal for 40 planes valued at $10.1 billion (USD) was signed off in November 2016. It seems there is closed order for 28 Boeing F/A-18E/F Super Hornets to Kuwait, with an option of up to 12 more.

==== New ISR fleet ====
On 21 February 2018, the US State Department approved a possible sale to Kuwait of four King Air 350ER Intelligence, Surveillance, and Reconnaissance (ISR) aircraft, which is a priority for the Kuwaiti Air Force to establish its first dedicated airborne ISR fleet in its expansion and modernization efforts.

=== 2026 Iran war ===
During the 2026 Iranian missile strikes in Kuwait, a Kuwaiti F/A-18 shot down three American F-15E's in a case of friendly fire. All six pilots ejected and survived.

== Structure ==
| Base name | Function | Subsidiary components | Note |
|---|---|---|---|
| Abdullah Al-Mubarak Air Base | | 41st Transport Sqd L-100-30 Hercules 42nd Transport Sqd Lockheed Martin KC-130J 42nd Transport Sqd Boeing C-17 Globemaster III |
| Ali Al Salem Air Base | Flying School; Air Search and Rescue Combat Wing | 12th Training Sqd BAE Hawk MK.64; 19th Training Sqd Shorts Tucano MK.52; 88th Training Sqd SA-342K Gazelle; 62nd Helicopter Sqd SA-330H Puma; 32nd Helicopter Sqd AS-332M Super Puma; 33rd Helicopter Sqd SA-342K Gazelle; 17th Attack Sqd″Night Wolf″ AH-64D Longbow Apache; 20th "The Dark Knights" Attack Sqd AH-64D Longbow Apache | 7th Fighter Squadron Eurofighter Typhoon |
| Ahmad al-Jaber Air Base | Air Combat Squadrons | 9th Fighter Sqd F/A-18 Hornet C/D; 25th Fighter Sqd "Matrix" F/A-18 Hornet C/D 61st Training Sqd F/A-18 Hornet C/D |
| Air Defense Brigades | Air Combat |

== Equipment ==
=== Aircraft ===
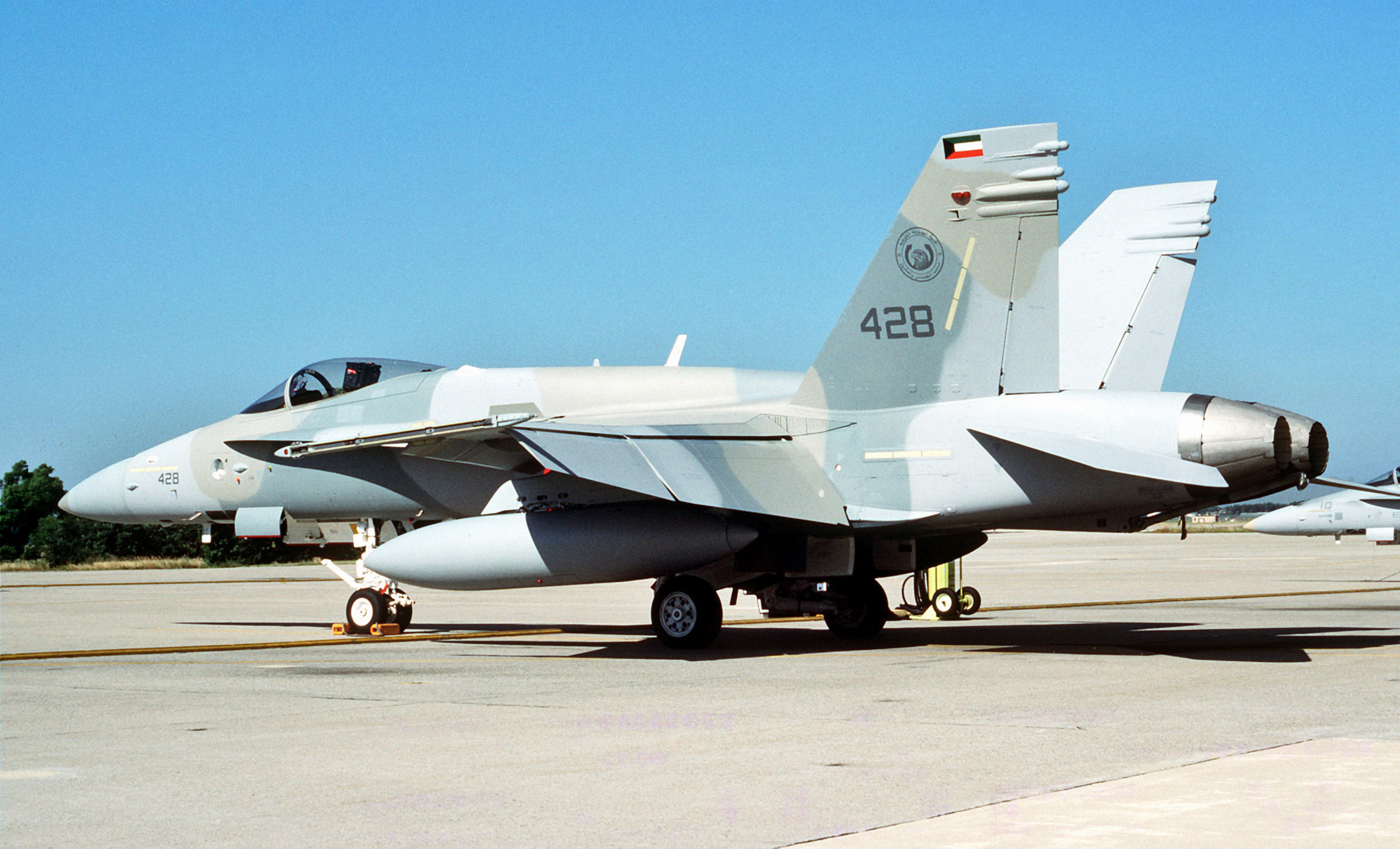
A Kuwaiti F/A-18C Hornet in 1993

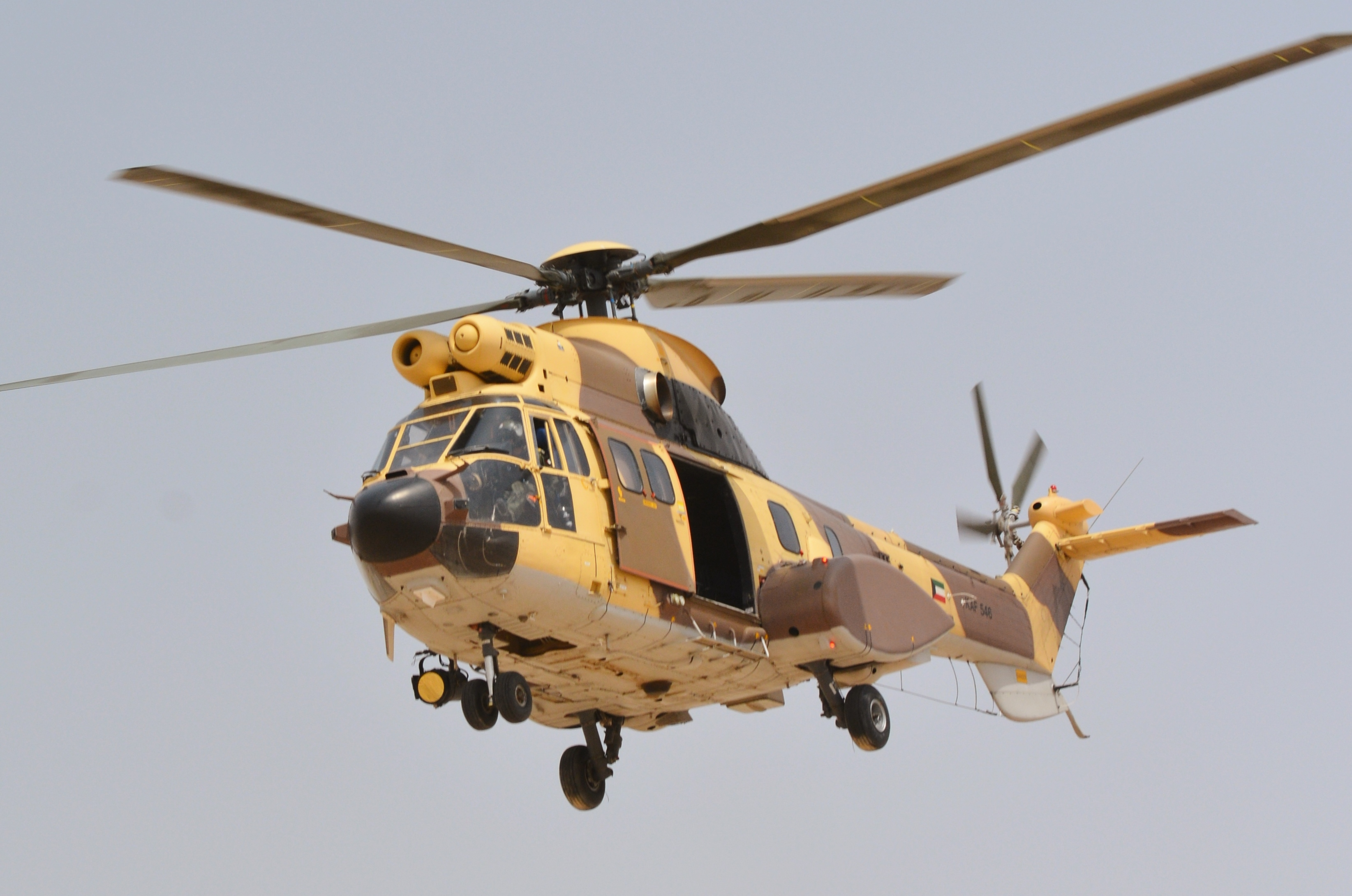
A Super Puma helicopter drops off troops during Operation Eagle Resolve, 2017

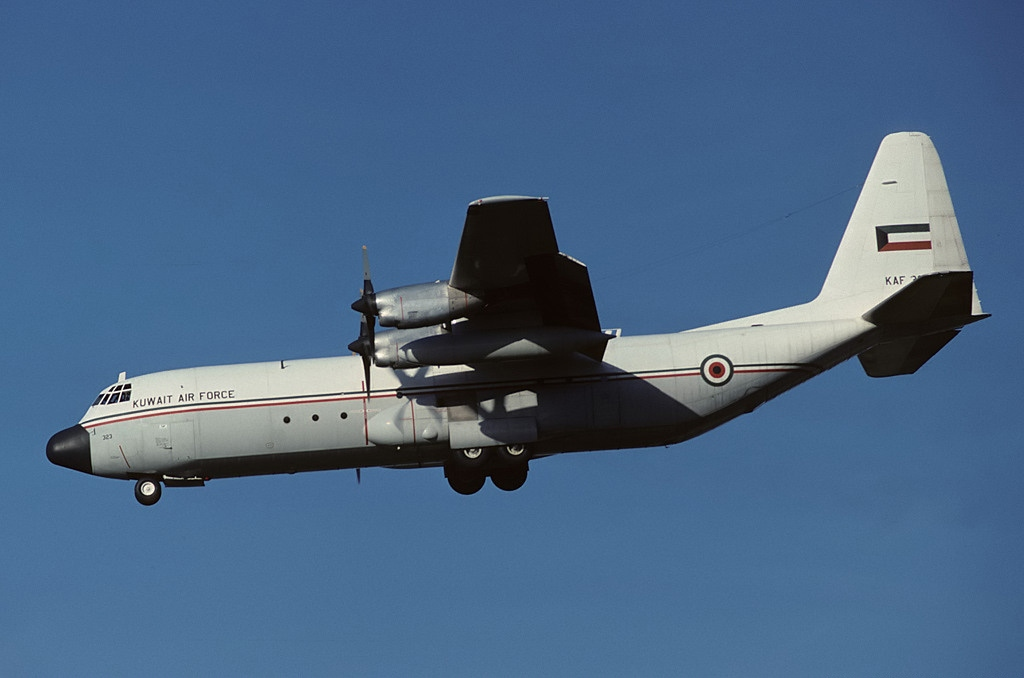
Kuwait Air Force Lockheed Hercules transport aircraft in 1999

| Aircraft | Origin | Type | Variant | In service | Notes |
Combat aircraft
| Boeing F/A-18 Hornet | United States | Multirole | F/A-18C | 27 | |
| Boeing F/A-18 Super Hornet | United States | Multirole | F/A-18E | | 22 on order |
| Eurofighter Typhoon | Europe | Multirole | Tranche 3A | 20 | 8 on order |
Tanker
| KC-130 Hercules | United States | Tanker | KC-130J | 3 | |
Transport
| Beechcraft Super King Air | United States | ISR | King Air 350ER | | 4 on order |
| Boeing C-17 Globemaster III | United States | Strategic airlifter | C-17A | 2 | |
Helicopters
| Boeing AH-64 Apache | United States | Attack | AH-64D | 16 | 8 AH-64Es on order |
| Sikorsky S-92 | United States | VIP transport | | 4 | Flown for the State of Kuwait |
| Eurocopter AS332 | France | Transport / Utility | | 5 | |
| Aérospatiale SA330 | France | Transport / Utility | | 6 | |
| Aérospatiale SA342 | France | Anti-armor / Scout | | 13 | |
| Airbus H225M | France | Transport / Utility | | 30 | 4 used by the Kuwait Naval Force , and 6 by the Kuwait National Guard |
Trainer aircraft
| BAE Hawk | United Kingdom | Advanced trainer | Hawk 64 | 6 | |
| Boeing F/A-18 Hornet | United States | Conversion trainer | F/A-18D | 7 | |
| Boeing F/A-18 Super Hornet | United States | Conversion trainer | F/A-18F | | 6 on order |
UAVs
| Bayraktar TB2 | Turkey | MALE / UCAV | | | 18 on order |

=== Air defence ===
| Name | Origin | Type | In service | Notes |
Air defence systems
| MIM-104 Patriot | United States | SAM system | 14 | 8 are PAC-3 standard |
| Skyguard/SPADA 2000 | Italy | Low-to-medium air defense system (LOMADS) | +7^{[12]} | All Skyguard units upgraded to SPADA 2000 configuration. Each battery consists of a radar, Aspide 2000 launchers, and Oerlikon GDF. ^{[13]} |
| NASAMS | Norway United States | SAM system | ~ | |
| MIM-23 Hawk | United States | SAM system | 5 | |
| Starburst (missile) | United Kingdom | MANPAD system | 50 | |

== Ranks of the Kuwait Air Force ==
Commissioned officer ranks

| Rank group | General / flag officers | | | | Senior officers | | | Junior officers |
|---|---|---|---|---|---|---|---|---|---|---|
| Kuwait Air Force |
| Kuwait Air Force | فريق أول; Fariq 'awal | فريق; Fariq | لواء; Liwa | عميد; Amid | عقيد; Aqid | مقدم; Muqaddam | رائد; Ra'id | نقيب; Naqib | ملازم أول; Mulazim awwal | ملازم; Mulazim |

Other ranks

| Rank group | Senior NCOs | | | | Junior NCOs | Enlisted |
|---|---|---|---|---|---|---|---|
| Kuwait Air Force | | | | | | | No insignia |
| Kuwait Air Force | وكيل أول; Wakil 'awal | وكيل; Wakil | رقيب أول; Raqib 'awal | رقیب; Raqib | عريف; Earif | جندي أول; Jundiun awwal | جندي; Jundiun |

== See also ==
- Chief of the General Staff (Kuwait)
- Ministry of Defense (Kuwait)
