= Al Jahra Force =

Kuwaiti task force in the 1973 Yom Kippur War

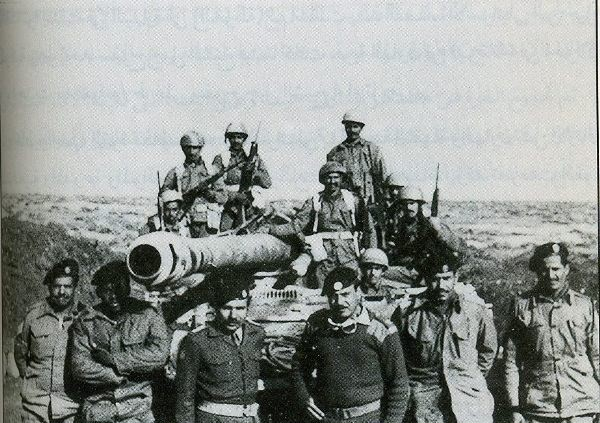
- The Jahra Force in the Golan Heights
- Active: 1973 - 1974
- Country: Kuwait
- Allegiance
- Branch: Kuwait Armed Forces
- Type: Task force
- Role: Combat support of the Arab Armed Forces
- Size: 3,000+
- Patron: Mubarak Abdullah Al-Sabah Saleh Mohammed Al-Sabah
- Mottos: الله، الوطن، والامير God, Fatherland, & The Emir
- Engagements: 1973 October War

The Al Jahra Force was a Kuwait task force, of roughly brigade strength, requested by then, Kuwait Minister of Defense, Sheikh Saad Al-Salim Al-Sabah and formed by Major General Mubarak Abdullah Al-Jaber Al-Sabah and his deputy Brigadier General Saleh Mohammed Al-Sabah; subsequently being tasked to the respective combat commanders on October 15, 1973, after the outbreak of the Yom Kippur War. The force, consisting of more than 3,000 men, was organized into a Tank Battalion, an infantry battalion, two companies of artillery, an anti-aircraft company and a combat company of the Kuwait 25th Commando Brigade. In addition, the task force also included medical, engineering and signal units. The brigade remained active until the end of September 1974, and then returned to Kuwait after a farewell ceremony in Damascus.

The task force was equipped with Vickers main battle tanks, Ferret armoured car, and Alvis Saracen. The first combat company equipped artillery batteries type Mk F3 155mm self-propelled guns while the second combat company packed 120 mm mortars type. The anti-tank combat units were equipped with Carl Gustav recoilless rifle. The anti-aircraft combat company was equipped with triple barrel anti-aircraft guns type 20 mm, Zastava M55.

== See also ==
- Chief of the General Staff (Kuwait)
- Fahad Al-Ahmed Al-Jaber Al-Sabah
- Military of Kuwait
- 1973 Samita border skirmish
