= Mubarak Abdullah Al-Jaber Al-Sabah =

Kuwaiti lieutenant general

- مبارك عبد الله الجابر الصباح
- Born: 1934
- Died: 1987 (aged 52–53)
- Military career
- Allegiance: Kuwait
- Branch: Directorate of Public Security Force (1953); Kuwait Army (1954–63); Kuwait Armed Forces (1963–80)
- Service years: 1953–1980
- Rank: Lieutenant General
- Commands: 1st Deputy Commander of the Kuwait Army (1954); Founder and Patron of 25th Commando Brigade (1960); 1st Chief of the General Staff of Kuwait Armed Forces (1963)
- Conflicts: Operation Vantage (1961); Six-Day War (1967); War of Attrition (1967–70); 1973 Samita border skirmish; 1973 October War

Sheikh Mubarak Abdullah Al-Jaber Al-Sabah (Arabic: الشيخ مبارك عبد الله الجابر الصباح; 1934–1987) was a member of the House of Sabah and one of the first Kuwaitis to attain the military rank of lieutenant general. He was one of the first Kuwaitis to be commissioned as an officer by the Royal Military Academy Sandhurst, UK, and the first Kuwaiti to receive an Amiri Decree for appointment as Chief of the General Staff (in March 1963, before the age of 30). Mubarak initiated joint training of Kuwait Armed Forces and United States Armed Forces in 1977 and, the following year, was the first military officer to establish conscription.

== Early life ==
Mubarak was the son of Sheikh Abdullah bin Jaber Abdullah II Al-Sabah (1899–1996); the first Minister of Education of Kuwait and Munira bint Ahmad Al-Jaber Al-Sabah.

== Military career ==
=== Directorate of Public Security Force and Kuwait Army ===
Mubarak joined the Directorate of Public Security Force as a Lieutenant.

=== Kuwait 25th Commando Brigade ===
In 1960, Mubarak founded the Kuwait 25th Commando Brigade.

=== Operation Vantage ===
During Operation Vantage (1961), a plan for the defense of Kuwait, Brigadier General Mubarak and Colonel Saleh Mohammed Al-Sabah commanded the Kuwait 25th Commando Brigade and the Kuwait 6th Mechanized Brigade.

Following the crisis, Brigadier General Sheikh Mubarak debated with the HM's British Armed Forces on different deterrent strategies to protect Kuwait. A team of British military experts assisted him in organizing the Kuwait Armed Forces, liaising with the British Armed Forces for training.

=== Six-Day War ===
In June 1967, the leadership of the Kuwait Armed Forces; from the principle of Arab solidarity; participated in the Six-Day War with several Arab countries (Egypt, Iraq, Lebanon, Syria and Jordan) against the State of Israel. On the request of minister Saad Abdullah Al-Salem Al-Sabah, Mubarak (now a Major General) along with his deputy Chief of the General Staff Brigadier General Saleh, as acting lead combat commander, assembled a task force from various combat units, designated the "Yarmouk Brigade". Accounting for a third of the Kuwait Armed Forces, it deployed to the Egyptian front on May 29, 1967. On the morning of June 5, 1967, the Yarmouk Brigade came under fire, forcing its dispersal. The brigade regrouped and remained at the Egyptian front from 1968 to 1972 during the War of Attrition between the State of Israel and Egypt that started unofficially a week later.

=== 1973 Samita border skirmish and October War ===
Ongoing Kuwaiti border disputes with Iraq since Operation Vantage left the majority of the military of Kuwait on alert, deployed all around the Kuwaiti desert. In 1973 the Government of Kuwait; mainly minister Sheikh Saad Abdullah Al-Salem Al-Sabah under the guidance of the Emir of Kuwait; asked Major General Mubarak to assemble a task force to militarily aid the Arab armies deployed on the Syrian front; similarly out of the same principle redeployment of the Yarmouk Brigade engaged on the Egyptian Front in 1973. Taking into account the previous 1967, (1968–1972) and current deployment of the Yarmouk brigade on the Egyptian front, he and his deputy assembled a stronger striking force which was designated the Al Jahra Force, which consisted of infantry units, special forces, tanks, artillery, air defense systems and armored brigades. This force was assembled in the Kuwait 25th Commando Brigade and deployed to Syria in two parts on 15 October 1973 with an air component and the majority of the force by land on 20 October. The force gathered in Damascus and was initially in charge of protecting the capital.

The Al Jahra Force later supported the Syrian and Egyptian armed forces on the Egyptian and Syrian front of the war in October 1973 between Arab forces and the State of Israel known as the Yom Kippur War or October War. Mubarak, Saleh and the acting lead combat commander of the Al-Jahra force, led these Kuwaiti forces, in alliance with Iraqi Armed Forces, while at the same time battle-readying the remainder of the Military of Kuwait on the Kuwaiti borders due to the "Sanita" border skirmish.

=== Joint drills of Kuwaiti and United States Armed Forces (1977) ===
In 1977, Mubarak Al-Abdullah initiated the first joint drills of the Kuwaiti and United States Armed Forces.

=== Lieutenant General of the Kuwait Armed Forces (1979) ===
In 1979, Mubarak was promoted to be the first Lieutenant General of the Kuwait Armed Forces. He retired from the military the next year.

== Mubarak al-Abdullah Joint Command and Staff College ==
The Command and Staff College was established in 1995 and named the Mubarak al-Abdullah Joint Command and Staff College (MAJCSC) in memory of Mubarak al-Abdullah in 1997.

== Honours ==
- (United States) : Neck Order of the U.S. Legion of Merit, 1977

== See also ==
- Fahad Al-Ahmed Al-Jaber Al-Sabah
- House of Sabah
- List of emirs of Kuwait
