= Kuwait Armed Forces =

Combined military forces of Kuwait

- القوات المسلحة الكويتيه
- Service branches: Kuwait Land Forces; Kuwait Air Force; Kuwait Naval Force; Kuwait National Guard

Leadership
- Commander-in-chief: Mishal Al-Ahmad Al-Jaber Al-Sabah
- Minister of Defence: Fahad Yusuf Al-Sabah
- Chief of the General Staff: Bandar Salem Abdullah Al- Muzayan

Personnel
- Military age: 18
- Conscription: One year mandatory service for men aged 18-35 years

Expenditure
- Percent of GDP: 7.1% (2023)

Industry
- Foreign suppliers: Austria; Canada; China; Egypt; France; Germany; Italy; Poland; Russia; Sweden; Serbia; Turkey; United Kingdom; United States

Related articles
- History: Kuwait–Najd War (1919–1920); Battle of Hamdh (1920); Battle of Jahra (1920); Battle of Al-Regeai (1928); Six-Day War (1967); War of Attrition (1967–1970); 1973 Samita border skirmish; 1973 Arab Israeli war (1973); Gulf War (1990–1991); Invasion of Kuwait; Battle of the Bridges; Battle of Dasman Palace; Operation Desert Storm; War on terror (2001–present); Iraq War (2003–2011); Saudi Arabian-led intervention in Yemen; 2026 Iran War (2026–present); 2026 Iranian strikes on Kuwait
- Ranks: Military ranks of Kuwait

The Kuwait Armed Forces (Arabic: القوات المسلحة الكويتية, romanized: Al-Quwwat Al-Musallahah Al-Kuwaitiyah) are the military forces of the State of Kuwait. They consist of the Kuwait Air Force, the Kuwait Land Forces, the Kuwait Naval Force & the Kuwait National Guard. The governing bodies are the Kuwait Ministry of Defense, the Kuwait Ministry of Interior, and the Kuwait Fire Service Directorate. The Emir of Kuwait is the commander-in-chief of all defense forces while the Crown Prince is the deputy commander.

The early military structured organization which first dealt with security and the military following the engagements of Kuwait Army's infantry and cavalry protecting the three mounted defensive walls (third defensive wall mounted in 1920) of Kuwait prior and following to The Great War, was the Directorate of Public Security Force, formed during the Interwar period and mainly after World War II. The Directorate of Public Security Force already included the partnership integration of the Kuwait Army and Directorate of Police as independent forces following the formation of the first cabinet on June 17, 1962, after the independence. In 1953, the Kuwait Army split from the Directorate of Public Security Force; the latter merged with the Directorate of Police in 1959, giving formation to the newly established Kuwait Ministry of Interior. The Ministry of Interior includes the Kuwait Coast Guard and has several military commanders, designated by government protocol as assistant ministers undersecretaries, each reporting to the Minister of Interior who is designated by protocol as Deputy Prime Minister of the State of Kuwait.

Upon splitting from the Directorate of Public Security Force in 1953, the Kuwait Army acted as the de facto command leadership of the available armed forces since establishment. The Kuwait Army was created in 1949, thirteen years before the ministry and partly mainly at the time composed almost entirely of land force components with the Kuwait Air Force being created in 1953. With the creation of the Kuwait Armed Forces in 1963, the Kuwait Ministry of Defense eventually became and is the governing body of the Kuwait Armed Forces, which includes the Kuwait Land Force, the Kuwait 25th Commando Brigade, the Kuwait Military Police Authority, the Kuwait Emiri Guard Authority, the Kuwait Air Force, the Kuwait Naval Force, the Kuwait Military Fire Service Directorate and others. Each armed force at disposition of the respective combat commander, reports to the Chief of General Staff of the Kuwait Armed Forces who later reports to the Minister of Defense, designated also by protocol as Deputy Prime Minister of the State of Kuwait.

The Kuwait National Guard, however, is an independent combat institution from the Ministry of Defense and Interior and acts independently under the guidance, discretion and disposition of the respective leadership, supporting the Military of the State of Kuwait as needed and required. The Kuwait Fire Service Directorate, is also an independent public fire fighting body with military ranks and ribbons identifications.

== Organization ==
The three main military arms of Kuwait are the Kuwait Land Force, the Kuwait Air Force, and the Kuwait Naval Force, which includes the Kuwait Commando Marine Units. In addition, there are other independent and ancillary military formations. The independent formations include the Kuwait Emiri Guard, which is an independent combat force dating back to the eighteenth century (as the Rulers own Guards); and the 25th Commando Brigade, an independent commando combat brigade. Ancillary formations include the Kuwait Military Police and the Kuwait Military Fire Service Directorate.

The Kuwait National Guard, considered a combat formation, is independent of the Kuwait Armed Forces (and the Kuwait Ministry of Interior, which maintains several formations of its own, including the Kuwait Land Border Force and the Kuwait Coast Guard) and is the main internal and border protection security force.

According to the London-based International Institute for Strategic Studies, in 2007, the Kuwait Land Force had around 11,000 personnel, the Kuwait Air Force 2,500, and the Kuwait Navy 10 patrol and coastal craft, and there were 23,000 reservists for all services not including uniformed men and women of the Ministry of Interior and military of the Fire Service Directorate. There were 6,600 paramilitary Kuwait National Guard forces. It was considered that, although the Military of the State of Kuwait remained small per speculated policies and analysis, training and military readiness were taken seriously and were effective at the brigade and squadron level. The combat operational doctrine is different amongst the various combat forces forming and is highly dependent on operational capabilities and general manning formations within sizes and types of equipment packing.

== History ==
In 1950 Emir Abdullah Al-Salim Al-Sabah ordered the capabilities of the Armed Forces to be developed to deal with external threats. Accordingly, Abdullah Mubarak Al-Sabah was appointed Commander General of the Kuwait Public Security Force, the newly designated Kuwait Army and the initial forming of the Armed services.

In 1951 the Bren Gun entered into service with the Kuwait Public Security Department, followed in 1952 by the Daimler Armoured Car, both primarily with the Army (future land force).

In 1953 the border and security force was named the Kuwait Army and split from the Directorate of Public Security Force, and the latter merged with the Directorate of Police to form the preliminaries of the Ministry of Interior. Members of the previous forces became members either of the army or merged with police forces and the Directorate of Public Security Force within the Interior Ministry. The Kuwait Army was headed by Mubarak Abdullah Al-Jaber Al-Sabah who had recently returned from military training in the United Kingdom and reported to Abdullah Mubarak Al-Sabah.

In 1953 Abdullah Mubarak Al-Sabah established the first Kuwait Flying Club. The flying club was part of the Civil Aviation Directorate and graduated the first batch of Kuwaiti pilots in 1954; these later attended advanced training in the United Kingdom.

In 1954, Mubarak Abdullah Al-Jaber Al-Sabah was appointed Deputy head commander of the Kuwait Army, reporting to Abdullah Mubarak Al-Sabah. During that same year, Saleh Al-Mohammed Al-Sabah returned from the United Kingdom and was assigned as commanding officer at headquarters. Also in 1954 eight Auster aircraft entered into service with the Kuwait Flying Club for purposes of preliminary training.

In 1956, the Kuwait Army officially moved to headquarters and was equipped with artillery for the first time. Also during the same year, a new training center was established for the Kuwait Army.

=== Demolition of Kuwait City 3rd Defensive Wall, and formation of the Kuwait Armed Forces ===
The Kuwait Army split from the Directorate of Public Security Force in 1953; subsequently, the latter merged with Directorate of Police to form Directorate of Public Security and Police in 1959; following the demolition of the third defensive wall of Kuwait in 1957 through a ministerial decree for the expansion of Kuwait City; which later formed the Kuwait Ministry of Interior including the Kuwait Police. The Army was the first branch of what became the Armed Forces formed mainly of land force components. In the same year, the Army signed on the procurement of the Centurion tank, and two de Havilland DH.104 Dove monoplanes entered into service in the newly formed Air Force.

In 1958 Kuwaiti officers were sent to the Military Academies in Egypt and Iraq to train, and the Kuwait Army underwent its first alert following the coup of Abdul Karim Qasim. In 1959 the Kuwait Army set up its first mechanized combat brigade, the Kuwait 6th Mechanized Brigade, known later as the Kuwait 6th Liberation Mechanized Brigade, following the liberation of Kuwait during the Gulf War.

=== Operation Vantage 1961 ===
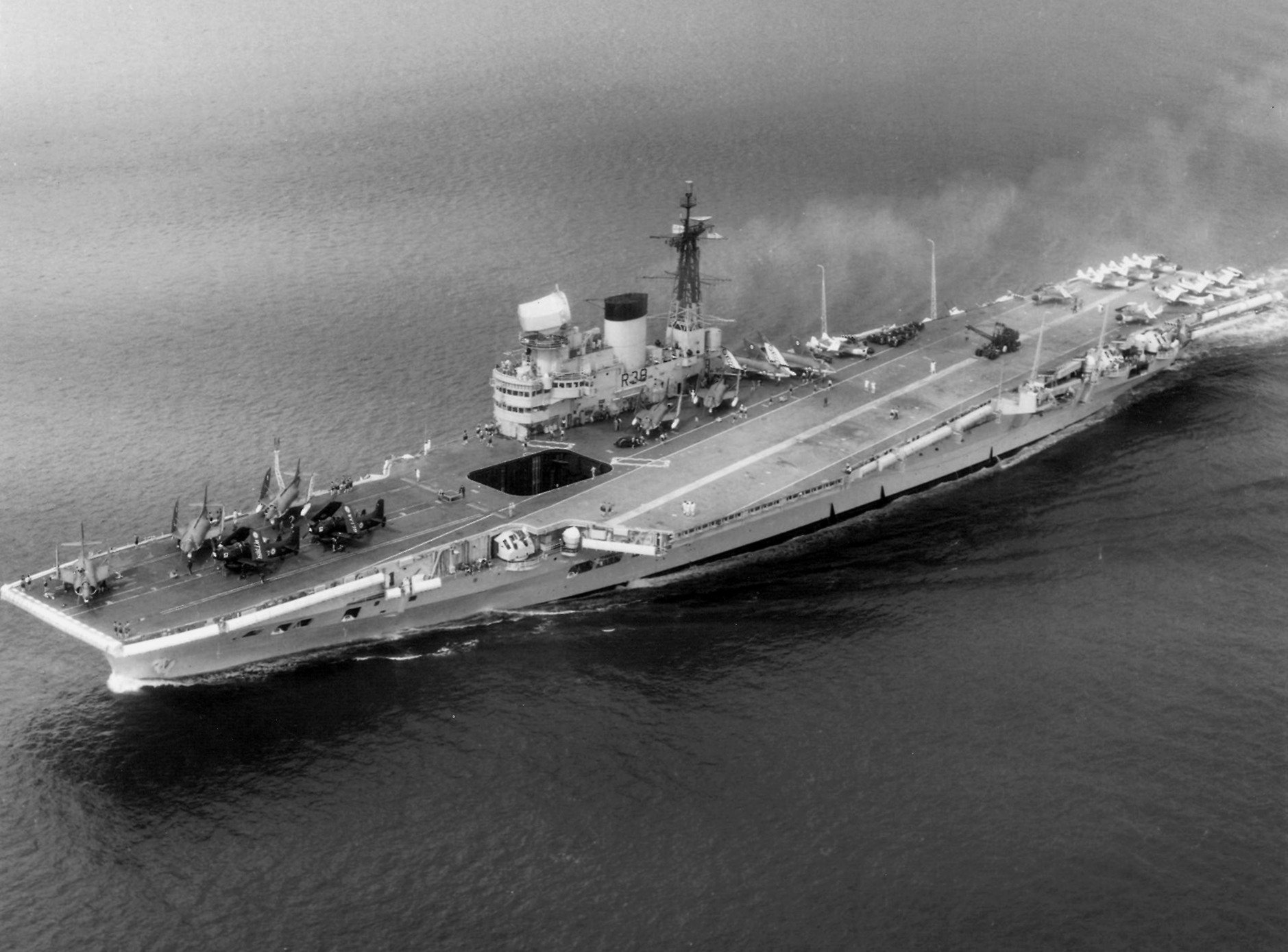
HMS Victorious taking part in Operation Vantage in support of Kuwait in July 1961.

After 62 years as a British protectorate, Kuwait declared independence in 1961. Iraq immediately claimed that Kuwait was actually an Iraqi province, and threatened to invade to implement the claim. Britain flew troops into the newly independent country to forestall Iraq, an operation called Operation Vantage.

In 1961, Field Marshal Abdullah Mubarak Al-Sabah, the Commander General of the Army was followed by the leadership of Brigadier General Mubarak Abdullah Al-Jaber Al-Sabah and his deputy Colonel Saleh Mohammed Al-Sabah who stepped in to take part in Operation Vantage along with the already active Kuwait 25th Commando Brigade as the Army was put on their second alert phase. Also during the same year, the Kuwait Flying Club was separated from the Civilian Aviation Directorate and the Kuwait Air Force was officially enacted. Also in 1961, the Universal Carrier was retired from the Kuwait Army. Over the following years and through combat experiences; Kuwait built a small effective military force including a land force, navy, air force, national guard, existing police force and fire service directorate.

In 1962 the Kuwait Army activated both the Kuwait 35th Shaheed Armored Brigade and the Kuwait 15th Mubarak Armored Brigade which were considered the second and third functioning armored brigades in service.

During that same year, the Kuwait Army held the first military parade in recognition of the independence of Kuwait, and the BAC Jet Provost entered into service with the Kuwaiti Air Force. Also in 1962, the Kuwait Police became an integral component of the Kuwait Ministry of Interior.

=== Establishment of the General Chief of Staff Headquarters (1963) ===
In 1963, an organizational Amiri Decree was issued, enacting officially Chief of General Staff Headquarters of the Kuwait Armed Forces.

Similarly, an Amiri Decree was issued to appoint Major General Mubarak Abdullah Al-Jaber Al-Sabah to the position of Chief of General Staff of the newly formed Kuwait Armed Forces. During the same year, the subsonic British Hawker Hunter jet aircraft and the de Havilland Canada DHC-4 Caribou transport aircraft entered into service with the Kuwait Air Force.

In 1965 Brigadier General Saleh Al-Mohammed Al-Sabah was appointed as the first Deputy Chief of General Staff of the Kuwait Armed Forces.

=== Six-Day War (1967) and War of Attrition (1967–1970) ===
In 1966, the headquarters of the Kuwait Military Hospital was opened. In 1967, the Chief of General Staff Major General Mubarak Abdullah Al-Jaber Al-Sabah appointed his deputy Brigadier General Saleh Mohammed Al-Sabah as acting commander of a hand-picked brigade from the Kuwait Armed Forces, mainly the elite of the Kuwait Army. Attached also to the elite brigade was Sheikh Fahad Al-Ahmed Al-Jaber Al-Sabah as acting commander by delegation of the 2nd Commando Battalion of the Kuwait 25th Commando Brigade. In 1967 several Arab nations were at war with the State of Israel in the Six-Day War. Kuwait did not openly participate, but a contingent from the Army took part in fighting in the central sector; Kuwaiti participation was too small to have any significant impact; nevertheless, going from the principle of Arab solidarity, the various combat operational unit assets of the Kuwait Army exercised their principle of solidarity and completed their mission. The assembled Yarmouk Brigade participated on the Egyptian Front, the first Kuwaiti military unit to fight outside the territory of Kuwait.

On June 6, 1967, the Kuwait National Guard was established under the leadership of Sheikh Salem Al-Ali Al-Sabah. On July 1, the War of Attrition against the State of Israel commenced while the Yarmouk brigade was engaged on the Egyptian Front. In 1968, Kuwaiti military authorities established the Kuwait Military Academy.

In 1969, the Kuwait Armed Forces placed the English Electric Lightning supersonic jet fighter aircraft and the Bell 206 and Bell 204/205 (mainly the 205) helicopters into service with the Kuwaiti Air Force.

In 1970, the Kuwait Armed Forces suffered seventeen fatalities in fighting against Israeli forces in Egypt. One man was killed in April and sixteen more were killed in June. During the same year, the Kuwait Air Force placed BAC Strikemaster light attack jets into service and the following year took delivery of Lockheed C-130 Hercules transport aircraft.

In 1972, the Kuwait Army introduced the Vickers MBT main battle tank series, and the Kuwait Armed Forces trained Egyptian pilots and technicians through the Kuwait Air Force on the English Electric Lightning.

=== Double-fronted wars: 1973 Samita border skirmish and October War ===
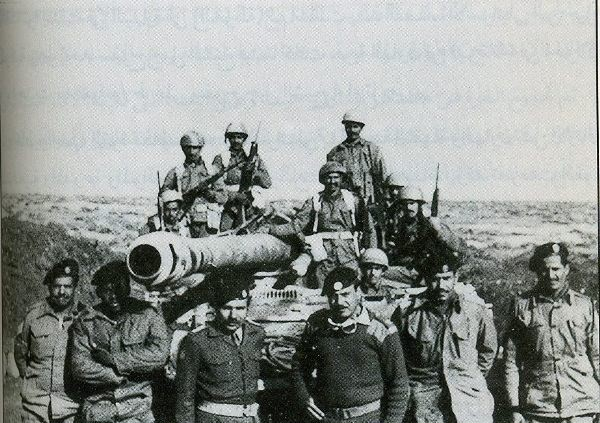
The Al Jahra Force in the Golan Heights

In 1973, the Kuwait Armed Forces entered into their third alert phase with the beginning of the 1973 Samita border skirmish which led to a significant change in the operational capabilities of the Armed Forces.

Also in 1973, the leadership of the Armed Forces found itself battle readying on two fronts. While components of the Armed Forces were readying to fight following the skirmish on the Kuwaiti border, Kuwait sent a token force to participate on the West Bank of the Jordan River alongside the Iraqi Armed Forces on the Egyptian and Syrian fronts during the 1973 October War against the State of Israel (also known as the Yom Kippur war), being especially heavily combat engaged on the Syrian front. As in 1967, Kuwaiti participation was too small to have any significant impact; nevertheless as in 1967, the various combat operational unit assets forming, exercised their Arab principle of solidarity and completed their mission. During 1973 the Kuwait Armed Forces officially enacted the Kuwait Naval Armed Service; mainly the Kuwait Navy.

In 1973 the leadership of the Armed Forces led a double fronted war with and against the same forming Arab belligerent for the State of Kuwait. The leadership led the Kuwait Armed Forces brigades through their combat commanders engaged on both Syrian and Egyptian fronts during the war against Israel with and alongside the Iraqi Armed Forces while simultaneously part leading and engaging the remainder of the Kuwaiti forces on the Kuwaiti border due to the effects of the 1973 Sanita combat engagement.

One year later in 1974 and as a result of unpredictable conflicting crises, authorities enacted a new plan to expand the Kuwait Armed Forces even further. During the same year, Kuwait Armed Forces introduced the Aérospatiale Gazelle and Puma series helicopters to the Kuwait Air Force.

=== State of Kuwait Embassy protection and general support to Halt the Lebanese Civil War (1975–1990) ===
With the outbreak of the Lebanese Civil War in 1975, units of the Kuwait 25th Commando Brigade were sent to Lebanon to protect mainly the State of Kuwait Embassy mission in Beirut. On another hand, a United Nations multinational peace deterrence force was formed by the United Kingdom, United States, France and Italy. The United Kingdom's contingents of the Multinational Force in Lebanon included Her Majesty's 1st The Queen's Dragoon Guards. United States formations featured contingents of the U.S. Navy including the United States Marine Corps, Air Force and Army. France's components included the French Air Force, French Army, French Navy including Aéronavale and French Regular and Foreign paratrooper regiments, companies, units including the 1st Parachute Hussard Regiment, the 17th Parachute Engineer Regiment, the 35th Parachute Artillery Regiment, the 2nd Foreign Parachute Regiment, others along with the 1st Foreign Regiment, the 1st Foreign Cavalry Regiment and the 2nd Foreign Infantry Regiment of the French Foreign Legion. The Multinational Force in Lebanon also included Italian paratroopers from the Folgore Brigade, infantry units from the Bersaglieri regiments and Italian Marines of the San Marco Battalion.

In the parallel diplomatic couloir of the United Nations peace initiative force and mainly at the level of leading Arab international diplomacy and humanitarianism; the State of Kuwait support participated in bringing the Lebanese Civil War to a halt (1975–1990).

A mission for this purpose was led by Sheikh Sabah Al-Ahmad Al-Jaber Al-Sabah, then Minister of Foreign Affairs of the State of Kuwait, during the reign of Emir of Kuwait, Sheikh Jaber Al-Ahmad Al-Jaber Al-Sabah.

During 1975, Kuwait defense authorities enacted the establishment of the first Kuwait naval base. During the same year, Kuwait Armed Forces signed on the delivery of the MIM-23 Hawk surface-to-air missile system and merged the Air Defense component to the Kuwait Air Force. The de Havilland Canada DHC-4 Caribou was retired from service.

In 1976, the Kuwait Armed Forces took delivery of Dassault Mirage F1s to be operated by the Kuwait Air Force. During the same year, the Kuwait Air Force retired the Bell 206 and Bell 204/205 from service.

In 1977, the Kuwait Armed Forces initiated the first drill training with the United States Armed Forces. During the same year, authorities enacted the Ahmed Al Jaber Air Base, officially opened in 1979, and Ali Al Salem Air Base, officially opened in 1980. During the year of 1977, the Kuwait Armed Forces retired several equipment operated by the Air Force and Army and gained one new operating equipment. The English Electric Lightning and Hawker Hunter were retired by the Kuwait Air Force and Douglas A-4 Skyhawks were introduced; while the Centurion Tanks were given to Somalia by the Army, as deliveries of Chieftain MBT started to arrive.

=== Creation of the Kuwait Naval Force (1978) ===
In 1978, the Kuwait Navy was created and designated as the sea-based component of the Kuwait Armed Forces. During the same period, the Kuwait Army entered into service the M113 armored personnel carrier, the 9K52 Luna-M short-range artillery rocket system and the M109 howitzer.

=== Iran–Iraq War (1980–1988) ===
In 1980, the Iran–Iraq War broke out and the Kuwait Armed Forces entered into their fourth alert phase. During the same year, the Kuwait Armed Forces signed on the procurement of naval warships for the Kuwait Navy.

=== First joint Kuwait-Saudi Arabian air drills (1983) ===
In 1983, the Kuwait Armed Forces carried out the first air joint training with the Royal Saudi Air Force using Douglas A-4 Skyhawks.

In 1984, the Kuwait Armed Forces enter the short-range tactical surface-to-air missile system 9K33 Osa in service to be operated by the Kuwait Air Force. During the same year, the ordered naval warships arrived and were directly commissioned by the Kuwait Naval Force.

=== Official enacting of the Land Force of the Kuwait Armed Forces (1988) ===
In 1988, the Kuwait Land Force was officially designated as the land component of the Kuwait Armed Forces. The Kuwait Armed Forces were removed from their alert phase with the ending of the Iran-Iraq War. The eight-year fourth alert phase was the longest in the Armed Forces' history. With the ending of the Iran-Iraq War, the Kuwait Army adopted the BMP-2 infantry combat vehicle.

In 1989, the Kuwait Armed Forces signed on the delivery of F/A-18 Hornets and launched the opening of the new Kuwaiti Military Hospital.

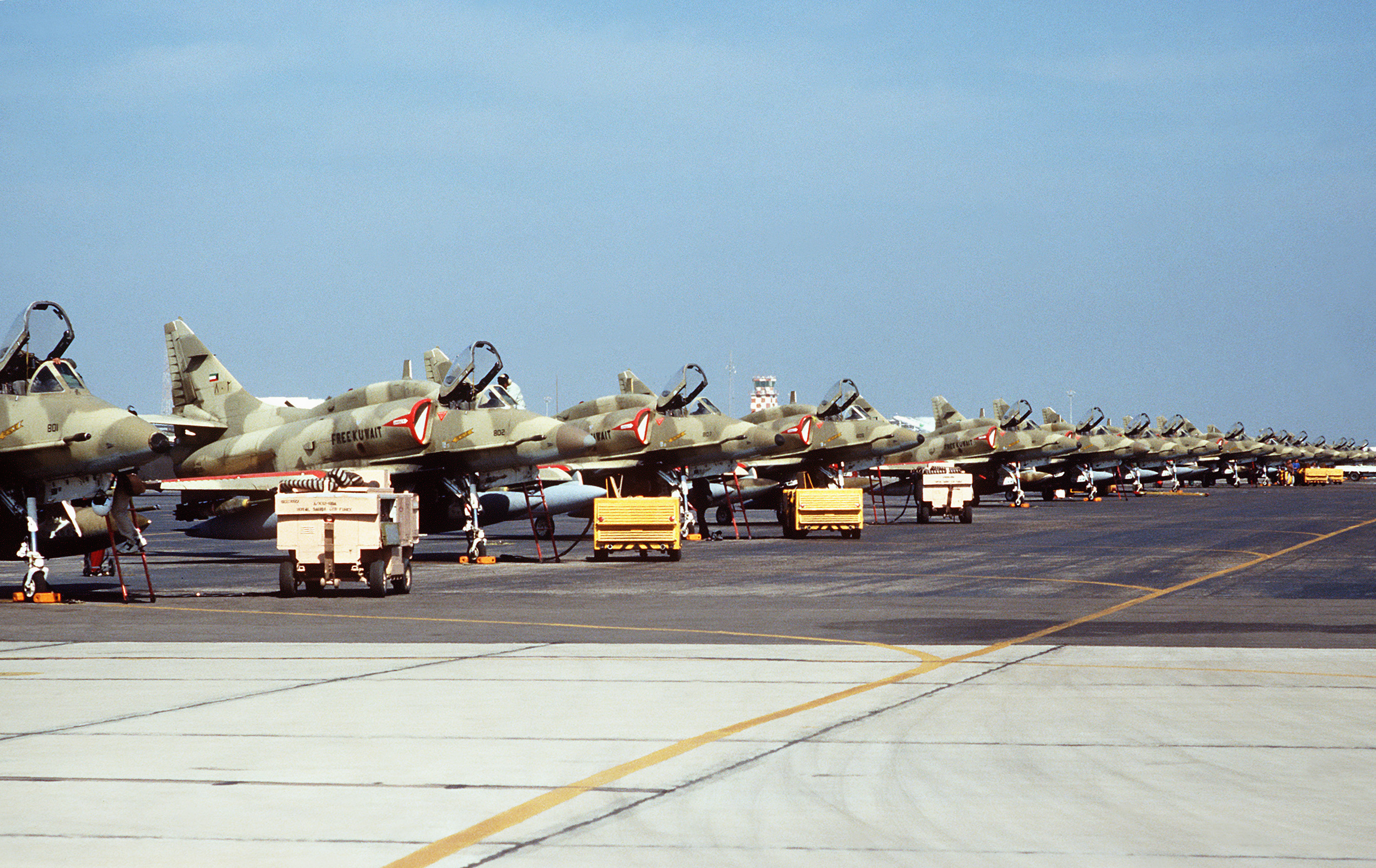
Douglas A-4 Skyhawk aircraft of the Kuwaiti Air Force are serviced on a flight line in preparation for a mission during Operation Desert Storm on 13 Feb 1991

=== Iraqi invasion and aftermath (1990) ===
On 2 August 1990, Iraqi forces invaded Kuwait. The larger Iraqi army brushed aside resistance by the 20,000-strong Kuwait Armed Forces with heavy casualties; after two days, Kuwait had been fully conquered. There were some instances of especially heroic resistance, particularly by combat aircraft pilots. Kuwaiti Forces, principally the Kuwait 35th Shaheed (Martyr) Armored Brigade of the Kuwait Army, engaged in the Battle of the Bridges near Al Jahra under Colonel Salem Masoud Al-Sorour, and the Kuwait Emiri Guards were engaged in the Battle of Dasman Palace with the Emir's half-brother Sheikh Fahad Al-Ahmed Al-Jaber Al-Sabah.

Iraqi forces seized most of the heavy military equipment of the Kuwaiti military and used it against the coalition forces. This included the entire navy, which was sunk by coalition forces; tanks and armoured personnel carriers were also seized. While the Iraqis were required to return seized equipment after their defeat, most of it was damaged beyond repair. Only the air force escaped destruction, as many of its aircraft had escaped to Saudi Arabia.

=== Gulf War and Operation Desert Storm (1990–1991) ===
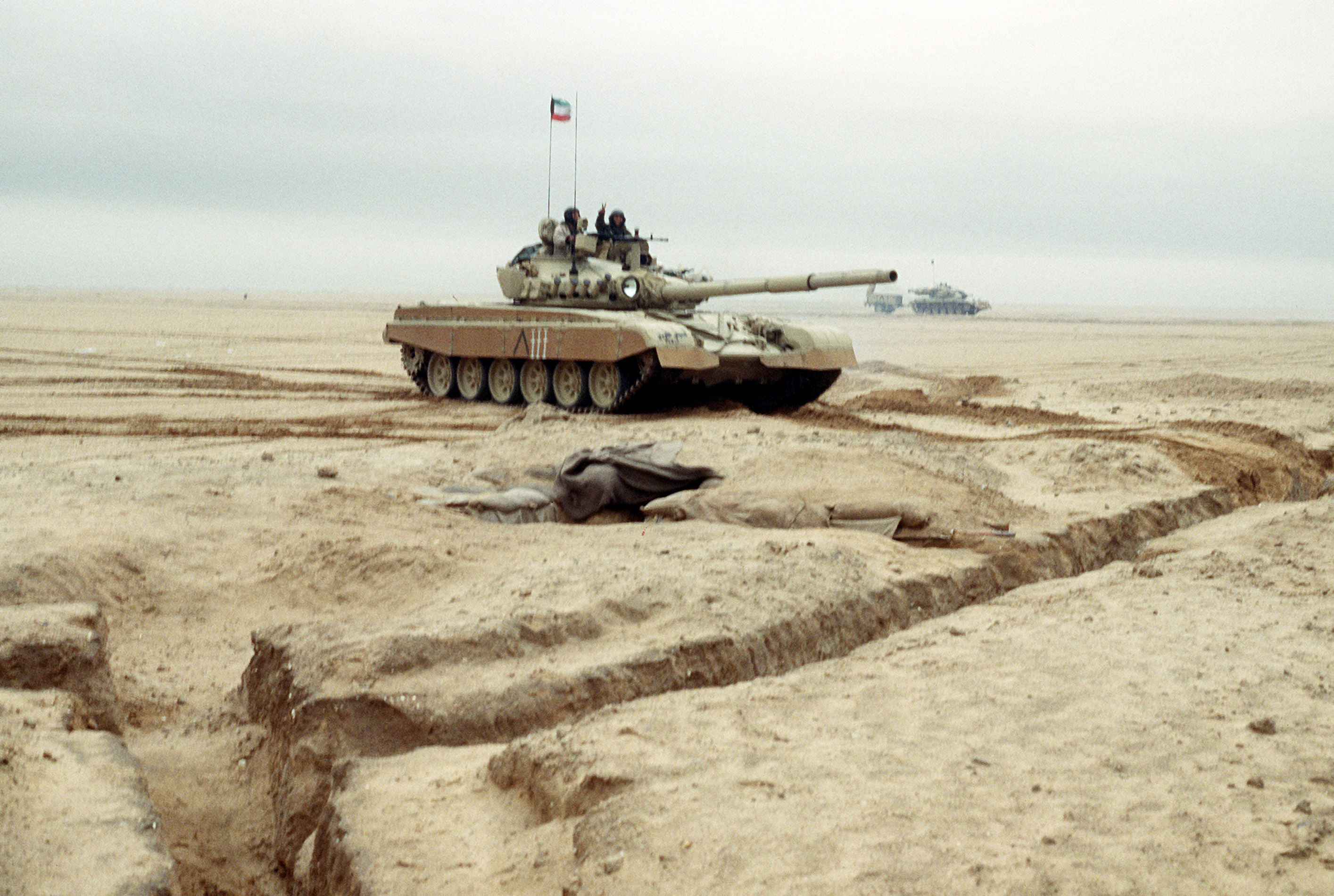
Kuwaiti M-84 MBTs.

Ground troop movements 24–28 February 1991 during Operation Desert Storm

In the same year, Kuwait was part of a U.S.-led military coalition formed in response to the invasion which expelled Iraq from Kuwait in what became known as the Gulf War or First Persian Gulf War. Operation Desert Storm was launched by the coalition. Douglas A-4 Skyhawks of the Kuwait Air Force destroyed several Iraqi Naval ships trying to infiltrate into Bubiyan Island. The Kuwait Armed Forces commissioned and entered into service the M-84 battle tank during the attack on Iraqi forces in Saudi Arabia.

After the four-week air campaign, coalition forces launched the ground offensive. They quickly penetrated deep into Iraq, with the Legion taking the Al Salman Airport, meeting little resistance. The war ended after a hundred hours of fighting on the ground, which resulted in very light casualties for the Legion.

==== Aftermath ====
U.S. President George H. W. Bush condemned the invasion and led efforts to drive out the Iraqi forces. Authorized by the United Nations Security Council, an American-led coalition of 34 nations led by Norman Schwarzkopf, Jr. fought the Gulf War to liberate Kuwait. Following several weeks of aerial bombardment, a U.S.-led United Nations (UN) coalition began a ground assault on 23 February 1991 that completely removed Iraqi forces from Kuwait in four days. After liberation, the UN, under Security Council Resolution 687, demarcated the Iraq-Kuwait boundary on the basis of the 1932 and the 1963 agreements between the two states. In November 1994, Iraq formally accepted the UN-demarcated border with Kuwait, which had been further spelled out in Security Council Resolutions 773 (1992) and 833 (1993).

There was an exodus of Palestinian from Kuwait during and after the Gulf War. During the Iraqi occupation more than 200,000 Palestinians fled Kuwait due to harassment, intimidation by Iraqi security forces, and being dismissed from their employment due to Iraqi influence. After the Gulf War, the Kuwaiti authorities forcibly pressured nearly 200,000 Palestinians to leave Kuwait in 1991. This was in response to the alignment of Palestinian leader Yasser Arafat and the PLO with Iraqi dictator and invader of Kuwait Saddam Hussein. The Palestinians who fled Kuwait were Jordanians naturalized citizens.

After the liberation, Kuwait became a close military partner of the United States, Britain and France.

Kuwait entered into a ten-year defense cooperation agreement with the United States in September 1991, and later with the United Kingdom and France. The defense cooperation with the United States, the United Kingdom and France is done at the training level in the foreign country and the joint military exercise level on Kuwaiti soil.

The agreement with the United States also includes port access, military equipment storage, and joint training and exercises. The agreement did not officially provide for the stationing of United States service personnel in Kuwait, as the 1,500 US personnel remaining after the Gulf War were scheduled to leave within a few months.

In 1992, the Kuwait Armed Forces initiated joint structuring of its various Armed Forces. In the same year, F/A-18 Hornet aircraft were delivered and entered official service with the Kuwaiti Air Force.

=== October 1994 crisis with Iraq ===
In 1994, the Kuwait Armed Forces entered their fifth alert phase with the beginning of the Iraq disarmament crisis in October, and the Kuwait Air Force signed on the delivery of Starburst missile systems.

In 1995, the Desert Warrior tracked armoured vehicle and the BM-30 Smerch System entered into service with the Kuwait Army.

In 1996, the M1A2 Abrams main battle tank and the BMP-3 infantry fighting vehicle entered Kuwaiti service. During the same year, the Mubarak al-Abdullah Joint Command and Staff College (Arabic: كلية مبارك العبدالله للقيادة و الأركان المشتركة - دولة الكويت), named in memory of Lieutenant General Mubarak Abdullah Al-Jaber Al-Sabah (1934–1987), opened.

=== Operation Desert Strike (1996) ===
Following Operation Desert Strike in 1996, Kuwait agreed to a United States Battalion Task Force to be permanently stationed in Kuwait. These US Army Intrinsic Action (later called Operation Desert Spring on 1 October 1999) rotations and US Marine Corps EAGER MACE rotations conducted combined training with the Kuwait Land Forces and other coalition partners. In addition, US Special Operations Forces conducted Iris Gold rotations to train and assist other Kuwaiti military units.

In 1997, the Kuwait Armed Forces entered into service the MIM-104 Patriot surface-to-air missile (SAM) system with the Kuwait Air Force.

=== Operation Desert Fox (1998) ===
In 1998, the Kuwait Armed Forces made an organizational change in command between the Chief of General Staff and his various assistants through the chains of command. During the same year, the Kuwait Armed Forces enter into their sixth alert phase with the December 1998 bombing of Iraq (code-named Operation Desert Fox) between the United States, the United Kingdom and Iraq.

=== 50th Anniversary of the Kuwait Army (1999) ===
In 1999, during the reign of Sheikh Jaber Al-Ahmad Al-Jaber Al-Sabah, the General Staff Headquarters of the Kuwait Army commemorated the 50th Anniversary Golden jubilee of the Kuwait Armed Forces under the leadership of the Commander-in-chief, the Emir of Kuwait, and the directives of the Chief of the General Staff. Newly ordered armored Naval warships were received and directly commissioned by the Kuwait Navy and Coast Guard.

=== Global war on terror (2001–present) ===
After the war on terror began with military campaigns following the 11 September 2001 terrorist attacks on the United States, Kuwait was declared one of fifteen major non-NATO allies of the United States by US President George W. Bush.

During the Iraq War, the Military of Kuwait played an important role in supporting the logistical operations of the United States Armed Forces engaged in military operations in Iraq.

=== 50th Anniversary of the Kuwait Air Force (2003) ===
In May 2003, the Kuwait Air Force commemorated their 50th Anniversary Golden jubilee under the leadership of the Commander-in-chief, the Emir of Kuwait.

=== 50th Anniversary of the Kuwait Emiri Guard (2011) ===
In June 2011, the Kuwait Emiri Guard commemorated their 50th Anniversary Golden jubilee under the leadership of the Commander-in-chief, and the Emir of Kuwait.

=== 50th Anniversary of the Kuwait Naval Force (2011) ===
In November 2011, the Kuwait Naval Force commemorated their 50th Anniversary Golden jubilee under the leadership of the Commander-in-chief, the Emir of Kuwait.

=== 2015 intervention in Yemen ===
The Military of Kuwait went on alert as a result of the 2015 Saudi Arabian-led intervention in Yemen by a coalition of forces of Arab countries including Kuwait, which contributed aircraft of the Kuwaiti Air Force. The military, National Guard, Kuwait Police, and Fire Service Directorate activated defense plans to strengthen internal security measures. Defense measures also included intensifying security around oil installations in Kuwait and abroad.

=== 50th Anniversary of the Kuwait National Guard (2017) ===
In June 2017, the Kuwait National Guard commemorated their 50th Anniversary Golden jubilee under the leadership of the Commander-in-chief, the Emir of Kuwait, and directives of Sheikh Salem Al-Ali Al-Sabah.

=== 2026 Iran Strikes on Kuwait ===
In 2026, Iran attacked Kuwait by missiles and drones which was later intercepted, the PAC-2 and 3 were used in intercepting, multiple bases across Kuwait has been damaged alongside Kuwait International Airport in a drone attack, later the US Embassy was struck and Kuwait later intercepted multiple missiles near Salwa and Rumaithiya

== Order of battle ==
=== Kuwait Naval Force ===
The Kuwait Navy Force is the main sea deterring force with naval warships sailors. The navy includes the Kuwait Marine Corps and units of the Kuwait Commando Marine Units.

=== Kuwait Air Force ===
According to Jane's World's Air Forces the operational doctrine of the Kuwaiti Air Force is to provide air support to ground forces as part of a coalition, rather than alone. It is made up of 2,500 people organized into two fighter/ground attack squadrons, two fixed-wing transport squadrons, two helicopter squadrons, a utility squadron and a training/attack helicopter squadron. Although comparatively small in size, it is well equipped and trained, with Kuwaiti pilots averaging 210 flying hours per year. It does not constitute any offensive threat, but can support ground forces in defensive operations.

=== Kuwait Land Force ===
The Kuwait Land Force consists of active-duty personnel organized into three armored brigades, two mechanized infantry brigades, a mechanized reconnaissance brigade, an artillery brigade, a combat engineering brigade, a reserve brigade, and various other commands. The brigades are small by western standards, roughly the equivalent of small regiments or large battalions. They are "cadre forces", kept up to 80 percent of full strength, with the balance made up of reserves in case of war.

=== Kuwait Emiri Guard ===
The Kuwait Emiri Guard is an independent combat authority in the Kuwait Armed Forces.

=== Kuwait 25th Commando Brigade ===
The 25th Commando Brigade is an independent commando combat brigade part of the Kuwait Armed Forces.

=== Kuwait Commando Marine Units ===
The Kuwait Commando Marine Units are independent commando combat units part of the Kuwait Navy in the Kuwait Armed Forces.

=== Kuwait Military Police ===
The Kuwaiti Military Police is an independent combat authority in the Kuwait Armed Forces.

=== Kuwait National Guard ===
The Kuwait National Guard, considered a combat institution, is an independent body from the Kuwait Armed Forces and is a main internal and border combating security force.

=== Kuwait Ministry of Interior ===
The Kuwaiti Ministry of Interior is the governing body of the Kuwait Police, considered an institution, is an independent corps from the Kuwait Armed Forces and is an internal, coastal and border security force with combating and non-combatant elements.

=== Kuwait Land Border Force ===
The Kuwait Land Border Force of the interior is a border component of the Kuwait Police.

=== Kuwait Coast Guard ===
The Kuwait Coast Guard is a sea-based component of the Kuwait Police.

=== Kuwait Military Fire Service Directorate ===
The Kuwait military fire service are the military firefighters of the Kuwait Armed Forces.

=== Kuwait Fire Service Directorate ===
The Kuwait Fire Service Directorate are the public firefighters with military ranks and ribbon identifications.

== Relationship with the United States Armed Forces ==
An analysis of the U.S.-Kuwaiti strategic relationship after the Iraqi invasion was published in 2007 by the U.S. Army War College Strategic Studies Institute.

=== Forces ===
The United States of America has thousands of troops stationed in Kuwait as part of a defence agreement. The largest part is the US Army Central Command (ARCENT), part of the United States Central Command (USCENTCOM).

Active US Forces facilities:

- Ali Al Salem Air Base
- Camp Arifjan
- Camp Buehring
- Camp Fox
- Camp Patriot
- Camp Spearhead
- Camp Virginia
- Camp Wolf
- Abdullah Al-Mubarak Air Base
- Kuwait Naval Base
- Udairi Range
- Ahmad al-Jaber Air Base

Inactive US Forces facilities:

- Camp Doha
- Camp Moreell
- Camp Navistar
- Camp New York
- Failaka Island
- Mina Al Ahmad

=== Equipment ===
The United States has provided military and defence technical assistance to Kuwait from both Foreign Military Sales (FMS) and commercial sources, with all transactions made by direct cash sale. The US Office of Military Cooperation in Kuwait is attached to the American Embassy and manages the FMS program. US military sales to Kuwait total US$5.5 billion since 2004. Principal US military systems purchased by the Kuwait Defence Forces as of 2014 are the Patriot missile system, F-18 Hornet fighters, and the M1A2 Main Battle Tank.

== See also ==
- House of Sabah
- National Assembly of Kuwait
- Politics of Kuwait
- Saudi Arabian-led intervention in Yemen
- Saudi-led intervention in Bahrain

== References and links ==
- UNIKOM
- CIA World Factbook
- Summary of Kuwait military power Summary of Kuwaiti military
- Kuwaiti Military at Global security
- Anscombe, Frederick F. (1997). The Ottoman Gulf: The Creation of Kuwait, Saudi Arabia, and Qatar. New York City: Columbia University Press. ISBN 978-0-231-10839-3. Retrieved 23 September 2010.
- Slot, B. J. (2005). Mubarak Al-Sabah : Founder of Modern Kuwait 1896–1915. London: Arabian Publishing Ltd. ISBN 978-0-9544792-4-4. Retrieved 23 September 2010.
