= Chief of the General Staff (Kuwait) =

Head of the Kuwaiti army

- رئيس هيئة الأركان العامة
- The official seal of the General Staff H.Q.
- Incumbent; Lieutenant general Khaled Daraj Al-Shariaan; Acting since 9 September 2025
- Kuwaiti Armed Forces
- Member of: General Staff H.Q.
- Appointer: Minister of Defense
- Website: https://kuwaitarmy.gov.kw

The General Staff H.Q. of the Kuwait Army (Arabic: رئاسة الأركان العامة للجيش الكويتي) redesignated in 1953 following formation in 1949, is a management department of the Kuwait Armed Forces, the national military of the State of Kuwait. The Chief of the General Staff (Arabic: رئيس هيئة الأركان العامة) is the senior combat military officer governing doctrines of the Kuwait Army, the Kuwait Air Force and the Kuwait Naval Force, but excludes the Kuwait National Guard, the Kuwait Police and Kuwait Fire Service Directorate. He is appointed by the Kuwait Defense Minister, a deputy prime minister, who is appointed by the Prime Minister of Kuwait; the latter is appointed by the Emir of Kuwait, the Commander-in-chief of the Military of Kuwait.

== Kuwait Army ==
On 1 July 1961, when the ministry was not yet born during Operation Vantage, the Kuwait Army was the de facto command leadership of the available armed forces since establishment and acted as official minister advising the Emir of Kuwait on course of action. The Kuwait Army redesignated in 1953 was founded thirteen years before the enacting of the respective Kuwait ministry, mainly by Field Marshal Sheikh Abdullah Mubarak Al-Sabah in 1949.

| Name | Rank | Tenure | Note |
|---|---|---|---|
| Sheikh Abdullah Mubarak Al-Sabah | Field Marshal | 1949–1961 | General Commander of Kuwait Army and the Directorate of Public Security Force (1942–1961) until the two split in 1953. Founder and patron of Kuwait Army and Kuwait Air Force. |

== List of Chiefs of the General Staff (1963–present) ==
| No. | Portrait | Chief of the General Staff | Took office | Left office | Time in office | Ref. |
|---|---|---|---|---|---|---|
| 1 | Sheikh Mubarak Abdullah Al-Jaber Al-Sabah | Lieutenant general Sheikh Mubarak Abdullah Al-Jaber Al-Sabah (1934–1987) (Note: Deputy commander of Kuwait Army and Kuwait Air Force (1953–1963) partnering Directorate of Public Security Force until 1953. Founder and patron of Kuwait 25th Commando Brigade in 1960. 1st Chief of the General Staff in rank of major general in 1963.) | March 1963 | 1980 | 16–17 years | – |
| 2 | Abdullah Faraj Al-Ghanim | Lieutenant general Abdullah Faraj Al-Ghanim (1931–2017) | 1980 | 1986 | 5–6 years | – |
| 3 | Mezyad Abdel Rahman Al-Saneh | Lieutenant general Mezyad Abdel Rahman Al-Saneh | 1987 | 1991 | 3–4 years | – |
| 4 | Sheikh Jaber Khaled Jaber Al-Sabah [ar] | Lieutenant general Sheikh Jaber Khaled Jaber Al-Sabah (born 1944) | 1992 | 1993 | 0–1 years | – |
| 5 | Ali Mohammed Al-Moumen [ar] | Lieutenant general Ali Mohammed Al-Moumen | 1993 | 2 January 2003 | 9–10 years | – |
| 6 | Fahed Ahmad Al-Amir [ar] | Lieutenant general Fahed Ahmad Al-Amir | 2 January 2003 | 2009 | 5–6 years | – |
| 7 | Sheikh Ahmad Al-Khalid Al-Sabah | Lieutenant general Sheikh Ahmad Al-Khalid Al-Sabah | 2009 | 4 March 2012 | 2–3 years | – |
| 8 | Sheikh Khaled Al-Jarrah Al-Sabah | Lieutenant general Sheikh Khaled Al-Jarrah Al-Sabah (born 1953) | 4 March 2012 | 4 August 2013 | 1 year, 153 days | – |
| 9 | Abdul Rahman Mohammed Al-Othman [ar] | Lieutenant general Abdul Rahman Mohammed Al-Othman (?–2016) | 4 August 2013 | 14 April 2014 | 253 days | – |
| 10 | Mohammed Khaled Al-Khadher | Lieutenant general Mohammed Khaled Al-Khadher (born 1955) | 14 April 2014 | 1 October 2020 | 6 years, 170 days | – |
| 11 | Sheikh Khaled Saleh Mohammed Al-Sabah [ar] | Lieutenant general Sheikh Khaled Saleh Mohammed Al-Sabah | 22 October 2020 | 3 March 2024 | 3 years, 135 days | |
| 12 | Bandar Salem Abdullah Al-Muzayan [ar] | Lieutenant general Bandar Salem Abdullah Al-Muzayan | 4 March 2024 | 30 October 2024 | 240 days | – |
| 13 | Khaled Daraj Al-Shariaan [ar] | Lieutenant general Khaled Daraj Al-Shariaan | 9 September 2025 | Incumbent | Incumbent | – |

== Chief of the General Staff of Kuwait Armed Forces ==
The joint offices of the assistants chief of general staff are tasked with delegating combat responsibility for logistics supply command, joint military operations, manpower and others.

The joint assistants chief of the general staff combat commanders are the chief combat commanders of the Kuwait Land Force, the Kuwait Air Force, and the Kuwait Naval Force.

=== Assistant Chief Commander of Kuwait Land Force ===
The assistant chief combat commander of the Kuwait Army commands at his disposition the senior land combat officers and warrant officer commanders of the following infantry, mechanized infantry, artillery, commando, and tank brigades:

- Kuwait 6th Liberation Mechanized Brigade
- Kuwait 15th Mubarak Armored Brigade
- Kuwait 26th Al-Soor Mechanized Brigade
- Kuwait 35th Shahid Armored Brigade
- Kuwait 94th Saleh Al-Mohammed Mechanized Brigade

=== Assistant Chief Commander of Kuwait Air Force ===
The assistant chief combat commander of the Kuwait Air Force commands at his disposition the senior air combat officers and warrant officer commanders of the following air bases and their combat operational assets:

- Abdullah Al-Mubarak Air Base
- Ali Al Salem Air Base
- Ahmad al-Jaber Air Base
- Air Defense Brigades

=== Assistant Chief Commander of Kuwait Naval Force ===
The assistant chief combat commander of the Kuwait Naval Force commands at his disposition the senior naval combat officers, warrant officer, and commando warfighting naval commanders:

- Kuwait Marine Corps
- Kuwait Naval Warships

== Notable officers of Kuwait Armed Forces ==
- Fahad Al-Ahmed Al-Jaber Al-Sabah
- Mohammed Khaled Al-Khadher
- Mubarak Abdullah Al-Jaber Al-Sabah
- Sheikh Saleh Mohammed Al-Sabah
