= Mk F3 155 mm =

Mk F3 155mm
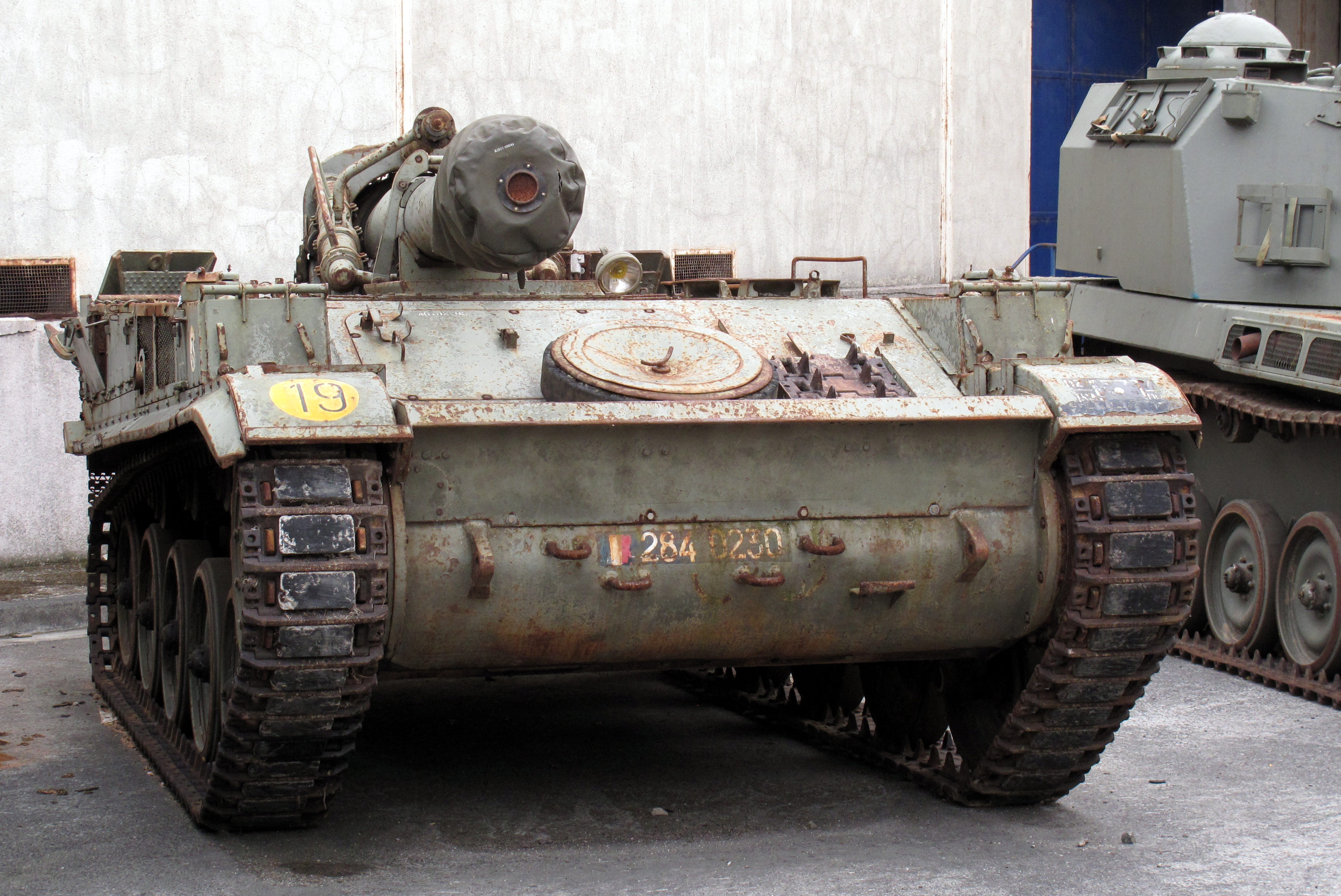
- Type: Self-propelled artillery
- Place of origin: France

Service history
- In service: 1962–present
- Used by: See Operators

Production history
- Designed: 1959
- Manufacturer: GIAT
- Produced: 1962–1997
- No. built: 621

Specifications
- Mass: 17.41 tonnes
- Length: 6.22 m (20 ft 5 in)
- Width: 2.72 m (8 ft 11 in)
- Height: 2.085 m (6 ft 10 in)
- Crew: 2 + 2 in the vehicle 8-man crew to fire the gun
- Shell: Separate loading bagged charge and 44 kg (97 lb) projectile
- Caliber: 155 mm L/33 caliber
- Breech: Interrupted screw
- Recoil: Hydro-pneumatic
- Carriage: Tracked
- Elevation: -6° to +75°
- Traverse: 360°
- Muzzle velocity: 725 m/s (2,380 ft/s)
- Maximum firing range: 20 km (12 mi)
- Armor: 20 mm (0.79 in)
- Main armament: 155mm 33-calibre howitzer
- Engine: SOFAM Model 8Gxb 8-cylinder water-cooled 250 HP petrol engine
- Power/weight: 14.4 hp/tonne
- Suspension: Torsion-bar with shock absorbers
- Operational range: 300 km (190 mi)
- Maximum speed: 60 km/h (37 mph) on road

The 155 mm self-propelled gun Mk F3, or the Canon de 155 mm Mle F3 Automoteur (Cn-155-F3-Am), was developed in the early 1950s by the French Army to replace their American M41 Gorilla 155 mm self-propelled guns. The Mk F3 is the smallest and lightest 155 mm motorized gun carriage ever produced, and because of its size and low cost it has found considerable success on the export market. Constructed on a modified AMX-13 light tank chassis, the Mk F3 is novel in incorporating room inside for only two of the eight required crewmen (the others riding in support vehicles). This allows the 155 mm gun to be placed on a smaller chassis than that employed by other armies, but exposes the outside crew members to enemy fire and other hazards.

== Design ==
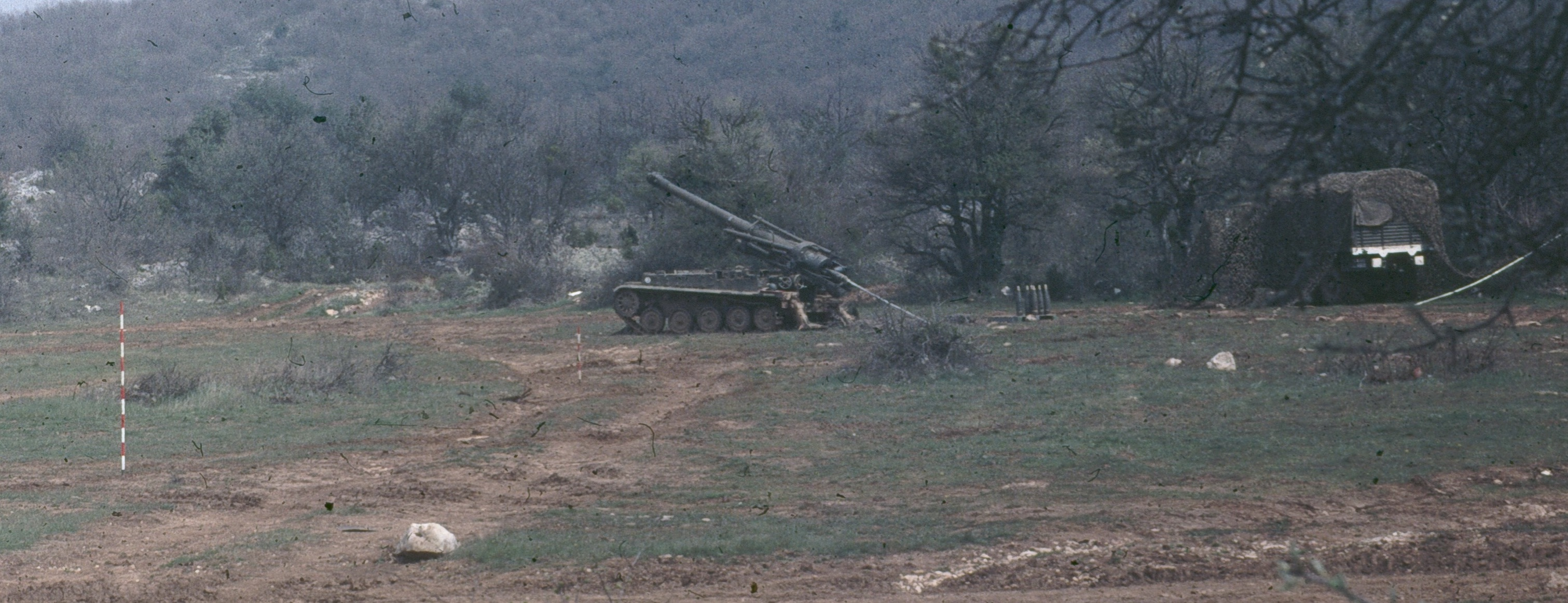
A French Army Mk F3 in battery, with a Berliet GBC 8KT support truck, during a military exercise in 1980.

== History ==
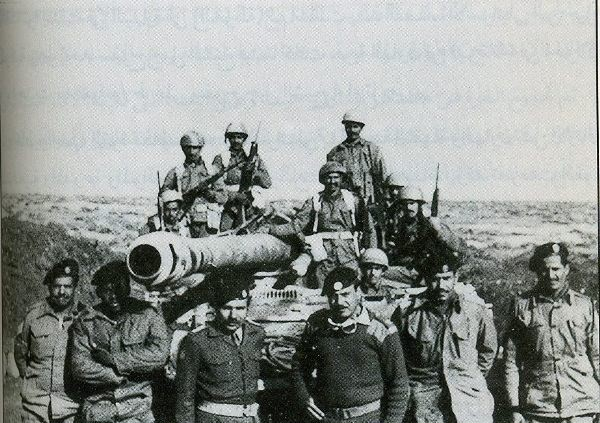
AMX-13 Mk F3 155 mm of Kuwaiti Army in Syria 1973.

It was used by Al Jahra Force during Kippur War on Syrian front. Morocco used its Mk F3 during Western Sahara War.

Iraq captured or destroyed 80 of these guns during the invasion of Kuwait.

== Variants ==
- The Mk F3 has been offered by GIAT with Detroit Diesel 6V-53T and Baudouin 6F 11 SRY engines.
- RDM Technology upgraded variant: in 1991, the Dutch company RDM Technology was contracted to upgrade 22 Mk F3s in service with Qatar. They were fitted with a Detroit Diesel Model 6V-53T turbocharged diesel engine and a new transmission.
- The CITER 155mm L33 gun reused many components of the Mk F3.
- 155 mm Mk F3 with 155 mm/39 calibre ordnance: proposed design with a longer gun.

== Operators ==
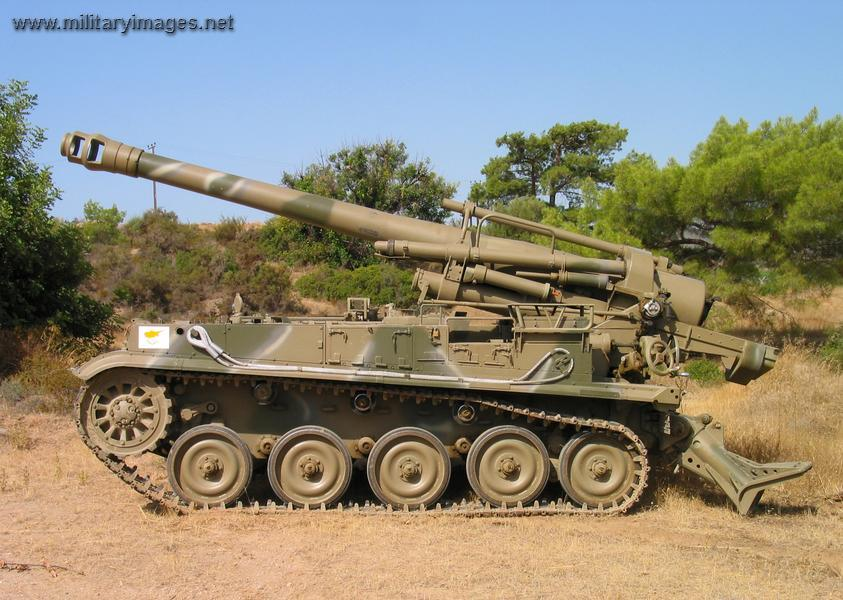
F3 of the Cyprus National Guard.

=== Current operators ===
- Cyprus - 12
- Ecuador - 10 or 12, 5 in service as of 2019
- Kuwait - 18, in reserve in 2002
- Morocco - 98, 90 in service as of 2019
- Qatar - 28, 22 upgraded from 1991
- United Arab Emirates - 18
- Sudan - 6 or 10

=== Former operators ===
- Argentina - 24 (until 2018)
- Chile - 20 (8 purchased from France in 1970s and 12 second-hand units purchased from Belgium in 1990s. All have been removed from service, replaced by 48 M-109)
- France
- Iraq - captured from Kuwait.
- Peru - 12
- Venezuela - 12 to 20, replaced by 2S19 Msta-S
