= Mohammed Khaled Al-Khadher =

Chief of General Staff of the Kuwaiti Armed Forces

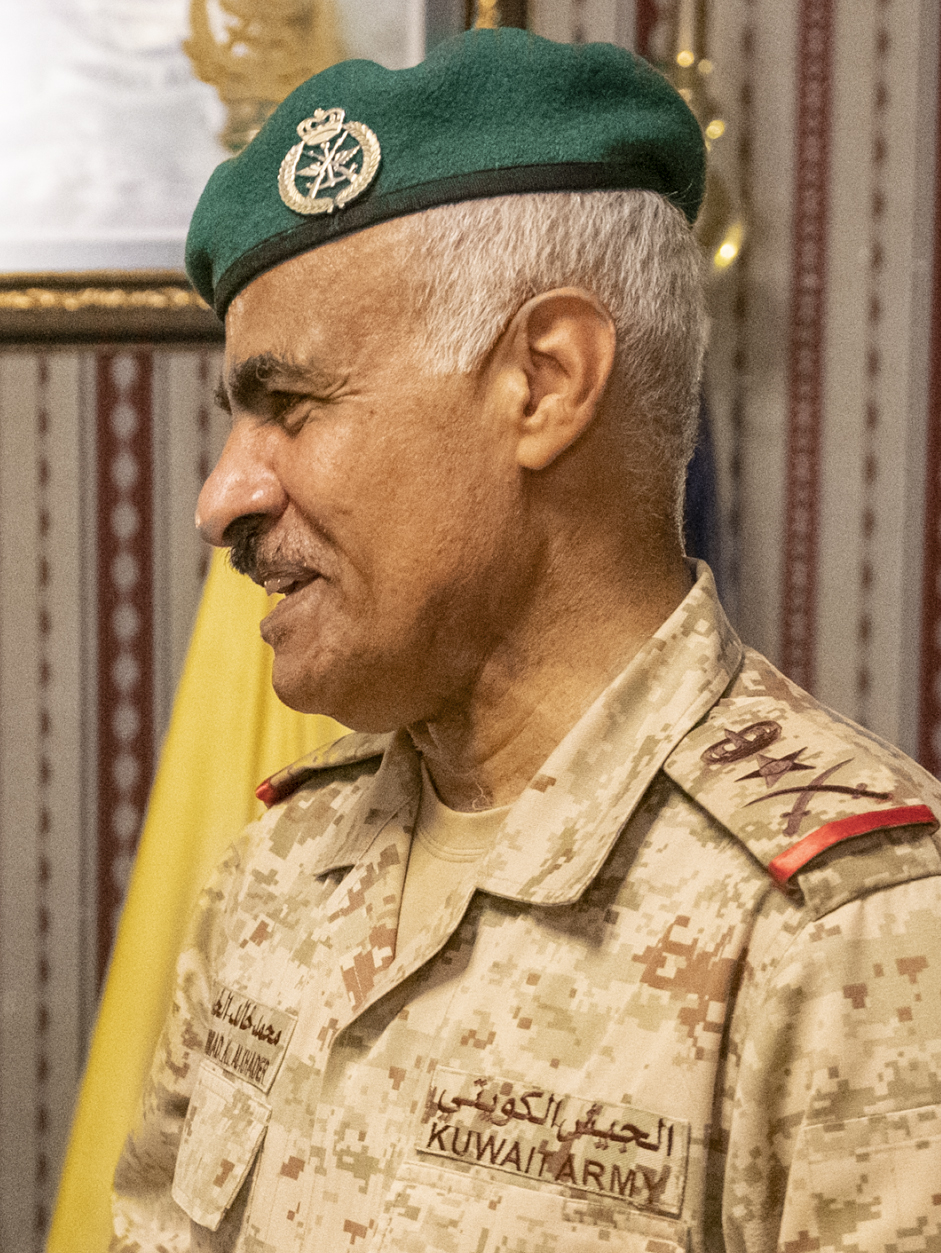
Mohammed Khaled Al-Khadher in 2019

Lieutenant General Mohammed Khaled Al-Khadher, الفريق ركن محمد خالد الخضر (born 4 October 1955) He is the former Chief of General Staff of Kuwait Armed forces. He is a commando officer in Kuwait Army who progressed in the chain of command since 1977, when he got commissioned from Kuwait military academy, currently Ali Al-Sabah Military College, until reaching the highest post in the Army as a chief of general staff.

== Early life ==
Lt Gen Al-Khadher comes from a military family where his three younger brothers followed his footsteps. He was born in Alshamiyah and lived his childhood in Jiblah and Al-Murqab before moving to Alfaiha in 1960 where he still lives with his family.

== Personal life ==
He is married and has 5 children (Aishah, Faisal, Abdullah, Abdulwahab and Abdulrahman). Lt Gen Al-Khadher is the elder brother of the famous melodist, Rashed Khaled Al-Khadher who died in January 1998.

== Military career ==
He got commissioned in 1977 from the Military academy in Kuwait and was part of commissioning course 8th's intake. His leadership skills has been prospered since completing his military training and this is due to his commitment and love for his country. In August 1990 when Iraq invaded Kuwait, he was a prisoner of war after his resistance's attempts to fight the invaders when he was at the commandos brigade near Al-Jahra. He was in Iraqi's jail for over 7 months along with many armed forces and police officers. After Kuwait's liberation in February 1991, he was freed in March and went back to his unit (Commandos). Since then, he took many command posts starting from his own unit and ending with the highest command post in Kuwait Army, Chief of Staff. Lt. General Al-Khadher was granted 2-year extension in his current position as a chief of staff of the Army, commencing from October 2015. This was as a result of his commitment the great work he has been producing which serves nothing but the best for the Military personnel. The proposal of two-year-extension from the Minister of Defense, retired Lt. General Sheikh Khaled Al-Jarah Al-Sabah, was welcomed by both their highness the Emir Sheikh Sabah Al-Ahmad Al-Jaber Al-Sabah and the crown prince Sheikh Nawaf Al-Ahmad Al-Jaber Al-Sabah. He survived a helicopter crash landing in Bangladesh on 2 January 2018 and was received by Bangladesh's prime minister Sheikh Hasina and by the Emir of Kuwait Sheikh Sabah Al-Ahmad Al-Sabah The Council of Ministers approved to renew the mandate of the Chief of General Staff Al-Khadher for three more years in May 2017, which took effect from the day he reached the legal retirement's age. General Al-Khader has worked in the following Positions: • Commander of infantry platoon in 5th Battalion of the 6th Brigade, 1977. • Infantry wing cadre (Commandos School), 1978. • Platoon leader of the Commandos unit. • Company Commander of the Commandos Unit, 1983. • Commander of Special Section (Commandos training), 1984. • Commander of Commandos training wing, 1987. • Second Staff for Operation and training, Commandos Force, 1993. • Assistant (XO) of Commandos Force, 1994. • Chief of training branch in Ali Al-Sabah Military collage, 1998. • Assistant (XO) of the Commander of the Commandos 25th Brigade, 2001. • Commander of the Commandos 25th Brigade, 2009. • Director of Ali Al-Sabah Military collage, 2012. • Land Force Commander, January 2014. • Deputy Chief of the Army Staff, April 2014.

In addition, General Al-Khadher has successfully graduated from the following military courses:

• Basic Infantry Course, Kuwait 1978. • Commandos Basic Course, Kuwait 1979. • Street Fighter Combat Course, Jordan 1981. • Advanced Infantry Officers Course, Kuwait 1982. • Sniper training Course, Jordan 1985. • Security and Special Safe Guard Course, Jordan 1987. • Commandos Battalion Commander Course, Egypt 1988. • Training Specialist Course, Kuwait 1992. • Leadership and Joint Staff College Course, Egypt 1993. • Defense Resource Management Course, USA 1995. • Joint Operation management course, Jordan 2004. • National Defense Course, Jordan 2004.

== Honours ==
He received the commander of legion honour medal from the French minister during his visit in August 2016 as an appreciation for his outstanding support to the military ties between the two countries. He was honoured by the Sudanese president, Field Marshal Omer Al-Bashir with the medal of Nile in February 2017. He received Bangladesh Army Friendship medal from Chief of Army Staff of Bangladesh General Abu Belal Muhammad Shafiul Huq in January 2018.
