= Kuwait 25th Commando Brigade =

- Active: 1960; 66 years ago
- Country: Kuwait 1961–present
- Branch: Kuwait Army
- Type: Special operations force
- Size: 1350-3000
- Part of: Kuwait Army
- Garrison/HQ: Kuwait
- Nickname: His Highness Commando
- Mottos: الله والوطن والامير God, Country & The Emir
- Anniversaries: National and Liberation Day (25 and 26 February)
- Engagements: Operation Vantage (1961); Six-Day War (1967); War of Attrition (1967–1970); 1973 Samita border skirmish; 1973 October War Egyptian & Syrian Fronts; State of Kuwait Embassy Protection (1975–90); Invasion of Kuwait (1990); Operation Desert Storm (1990–91); Operation Southern Watch (1992–03); 1994 October Crisis; Operation Desert Strike (1996); Operation Desert Fox (1998); Global War on Terrorism (2001–present); Iraq War (2003–11); War in Afghanistan (2014-2021); Yemeni civil war (2015-present); Somali Civil War (1993)
- Decorations: Military awards and decorations

The Kuwait 25th Commando Brigade of the Kuwait Army, commonly known as the 25th Commando, is one of Kuwait's various principal Commando brigades. The 25th Commando operates at the disposition of the respective commander who reports to the respective leadership of the Military of Kuwait; executing, participating in, supporting, and carrying out all conflicts in which the Military of Kuwait has engaged since inception in 1960. The 25th Commando executes general operations in support of the Military of Kuwait.

== Creation ==
The 25th Commando Brigade was founded in 1960 by the deputy commander of Kuwait Army, Brigadier General Mubarak Abdullah Al-Jaber Al-Sabah, prior to the forming of the first Government of Kuwait. An initial selection pool of 33 commando specialists was selected to form the 1st specialized platoon; which was considered the initial forming of the 25th Commando Brigade.

== Development and establishment ==
The 1st specialized platoon of the 25th Commando was established in 1960. Following the initial establishment came the forming of 1st company of specialized forces in 1961. In 1962, the 1st specialized force unit was formed and operated from the Kuwait 15th Mubarak Armored Brigade. During that time, the 1st specialized force unit operated extensively and trained continuously in the deserts of Kuwait. As the enlistments of initial specialists increased; their administrative requirements complemented the need. As a result, an administrative bureau was in need and due to the unavailability and incapacity of building infrastructures in the remote desert areas of operations; the bureau initially temporarily operated out of a designated training ground.

Shortly after, the commandos of the 1st specialized force unit were called to operate out of the Kuwait Army's 6th Mechanized Brigade in 1965; known later as the Kuwait 6th Liberation Mechanized Brigade following the liberation of Kuwait during the Gulf War. The 1st specialized force unit was moved and the specialized force battalion was officially formed. Following in 1966, the forming of 2nd specialized force battalion followed.

In 1970, both Commando battalions were united and were stationed in the Kuwait 6th Liberation Mechanized Brigade. During the same year, an executive military organization order on January 31 1971, was issued and changed the designation of the 1st specialized force battalion to a designated Commando Battalion; similarly, the 2nd specialized force battalion to another designated Commando Battalion.

In 1972, another executive military organization order was issued; requesting the transformation of the two Commando Battalions to infantry battalions.

In 1973, the Commando unit was formed and stationed to a location where they were designated as Commando Forces. In 1975, Commando Forces established an official commando qualified training ground. In 1987, the Commando Forces were redesignated and renamed to Commando Battalion. Following in 1994, the Commando battalion was officially known as Commando specialized force.

With the Lebanese Civil War in 1975, units of the Kuwait 25th Commando Brigade were sent to Lebanon to protect the Kuwaiti Embassy in Beirut. In 1993, a small number of 25th CB operators were sent to Somalia.

The commandos are responsible for raiding Iraqi dredgers to prevent them from digging in Kuwaiti territorial waters. The unit raided a big number of ships carrying supplies and ammunition for the Houthi movement coming from iran.

In parallel application with the 25th Commando and mainly at the level of leading Arab international diplomacy and humanitarianism, the State of Kuwait played a supporting pivotal role in bringing the Lebanese Civil War to a halt (1975–1990). A mission for this purpose was led by Sheikh Sabah Al-Ahmad Al-Jaber Al-Sabah; then Minister of Foreign Affairs of Kuwait during the reign of Emir of Kuwait, Sheikh Jaber Al-Ahmad Al-Jaber Al-Sabah.

In 2000, the former Deputy Prime Minister of Kuwait and Minister of Defense Sheikh Salem Sabah Al-Salem Al-Sabah signed on the recommended organization of the 25th Commando Battalion.

In the following years, Deputy Prime Minister and Minister of Defense Sheikh Jaber Al-Mubarak Al-Hamad Al-Sabah officially designated the Kuwait 25th Commando Brigade as one of the State of Kuwait's various official Commando initiatives in the Military of Kuwait, during the reign of Emir of Kuwait, Sheikh Sabah Al-Ahmad Al-Jaber Al-Sabah.

=== Selection ===
Approximately 60% of commandos are recruited from SF units and commando marines who already have a lot of military experience in fighting in all conditions and warfare.

- CFT test - 16.3 km carrying 24 kg within 1 hour and 44 minutes
- advanced CFT 1 - 24.6 km carrying 30 Kg within 2 hours and 5 minutes
- advanced CFT 2 - 30 km carrying 40 Kg

Other tests are classified.

In 2018 10 people out of 600+ managed to pass the tests.

== Notable officers ==
- Mubarak Abdullah Al-Jaber Al-Sabah
- Fahad Al-Ahmed Al-Jaber Al-Sabah
- Athbi Al-Fahad Al-Ahmed Al-Sabah
- Khaled Al-Fahad Al-Ahmed Al-Sabah
