= Kuwait Land Forces =

Branch of Kuwait's military

- Arabic: القوات البرية الكويتية
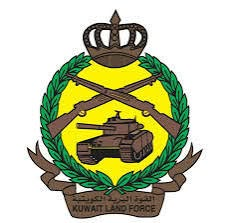
- Country: Kuwait
- Branch: Kuwait Armed Forces
- Type: Land force
- Size: 17,500 personnel (2024)
- Part of: Ministry of Defense
- Garrison/HQ: Kuwait City
- Nickname: His Highness Land Force
- Mottos: الله والوطن والامير; God, Country & The Emir
- Colors: Green & Red
- Anniversaries: National and Liberation Day (25 and 26 February)
- Engagements: List: Kuwait–Najd War Ikhwan Revolt Operation Vantage Six-Day War War of Attrition 1973 Samita border skirmish 1973 October War Kuwait Embassy Protection (1975–1990) Iran–Iraq War Invasion of Kuwait Operation Desert Storm Operation Southern Watch Operation Desert Strike Operation Desert Fox Iraq War Saudi-led intervention in the Yemeni civil war 2026 Iran war
- Decorations: Military awards and decorations

Commanders
- Assistant Chief Combat Commander of Kuwait Land Force: Brigadier Mohammad Al-Dhafiri
- Notable commanders: Mubarak Al-Sabah; Ahmad Al-Jaber Al-Sabah; Rahmah ibn Jabir al-Jalhami

The Kuwait Land Forces (Arabic: القوات البرية الكويتية), established in 1949, is Land warfare and the oldest branch among the Armed Forces of Kuwait. Its cavalry and infantry predecessors operated in desert and metropolitan areas in 1919, 1920 and 1928 to 1938, tracing their roots directly to the cavalrymen and infantrymen that defended Al-Kout Fortress since the 19th century along with various mounted defensive forces.

== History ==
The Kuwait Army was created in 1949 by Field Marshal Sheikh Abdullah Mubarak Al-Sabah (1949–1961) during the time when its partnership was included part of the Directorate of Public Security Force in 1938 prior to splitting in 1953. As Sheikh Abdullah Mubarak Al-Sabah headed the Directorate of Public Security Force which included the Kuwait Army; the later, was headed by deputy commander Colonel Mubarak Abdullah Al-Jaber Al-Sabah.

In 1990 and 1991, during the first Gulf War, most of the equipment was seized and or destroyed by invading Iraqi forces. At that time the Kuwait military was a lot smaller.

In early 2024, up to 149 M-84AB tanks were sent to the Djuro Djakovic factory in Croatia for refurbishment and repairs with the wide belief among military analysts they will be then sent to Ukraine.

== Structure and organization ==
- Kuwait 6th Liberation Mechanized Brigade
- Kuwait 15th Mubarak Armored Brigade
- Kuwait 26th Al-Soor Mechanized Brigade
- Kuwait 35th Shahid (Martyr) Armored Brigade
- Kuwait 94th Saleh Al-Mohammed Mechanized Brigade
- Kuwait 25th Commando Brigade (Independent)
- Kuwait Emiri Guard Authority (Independent)
- Kuwait Military Police Authority (Independent)
- Kuwait Military Fire Service Directorate

== Equipment ==
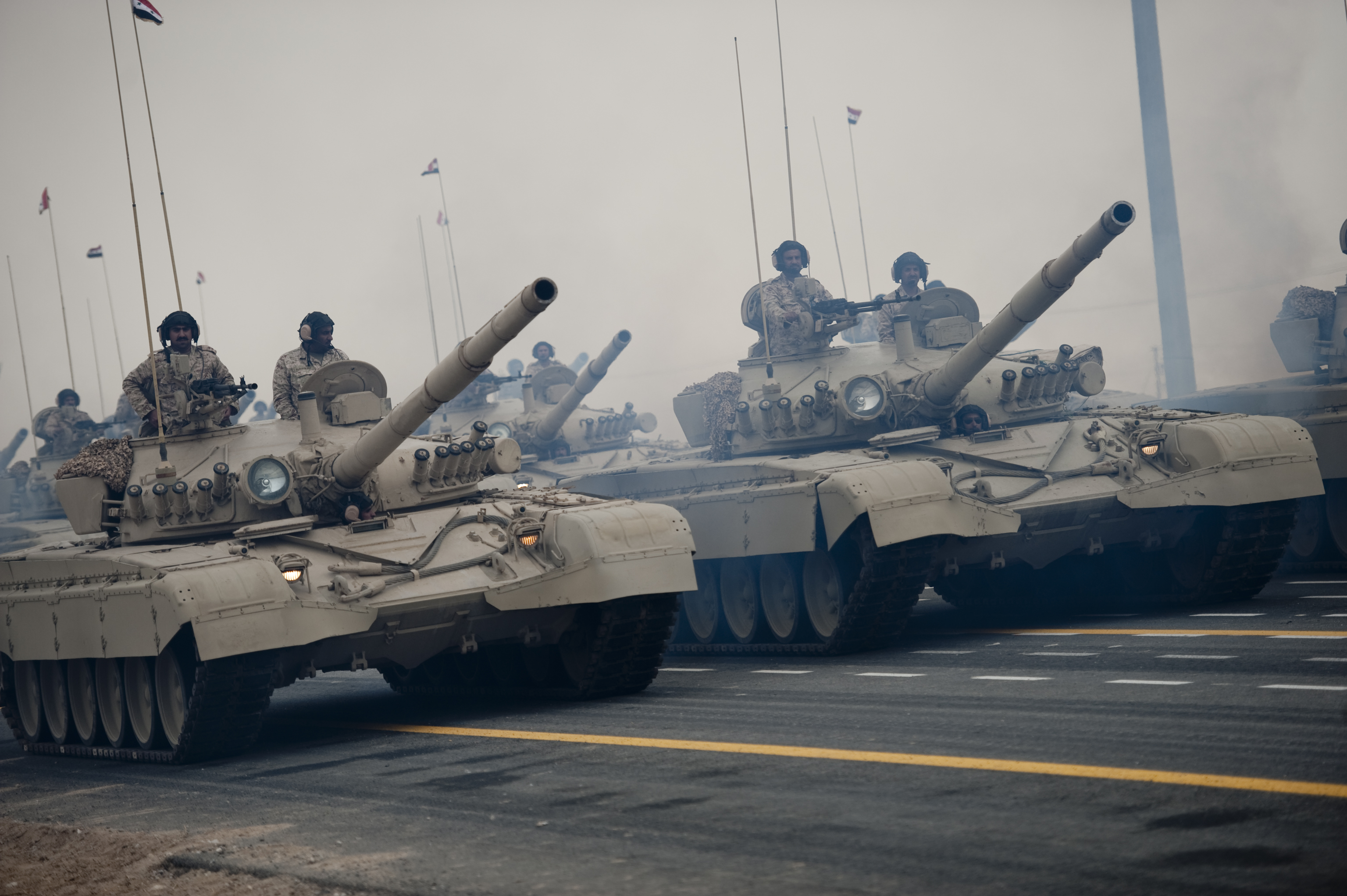
Kuwaiti M-84AB tanks parading on 25 and 26 February 2011 with members of the 34 nations coalition force partners; celebrations that marked the 50th anniversary of the Independence, the 20th anniversary of Liberation and the 5th anniversary of the ascendance of His Highness Sheikh Sabah Al-Ahmad Al-Jaber Al-Sabah to the leadership of the State of Kuwait.

=== Armored fighting vehicles ===
| Name | Photo | Origin | Type | Quantity | Notes |
|---|---|---|---|---|---|
| M1A2 Abrams | | United States | Main battle tank | 218 (M1A2) 218 (M1A2K) | 218 ordered in the 1990s, followed by an order of 218 M1A1 hulls upgraded to M1A2K variant in 2017. |
| M-84AB | | Yugoslavia | Main battle tank | 149 | 200 Ordered 1989 and 15 in service by 1990. |
| Desert Warrior | | United Kingdom | Infantry fighting vehicle | 254 | 236 with 25 mm gun, 18 APC. in 2009 Kuwait Upgraded the fire control system, (GITS II) hardware, Improved Thermal Sight System and 2nd Generation Forward-Looking Infrared Radar |
| BMP-3 | | Soviet Union | Infantry fighting vehicle | ~200 | 142 delivered in 1994–1997. A new contract was signed in 2009 for 70 BMP-3M delivered in 2010-2011. another Contract was signed in 2014 for 33 more, Executed on 30 September 2015. |
| BMP-2 | | Soviet Union | Infantry fighting vehicle | 76 | 245 delivered between 1989–90 and 46 delivered between 1994–95, 76 in service as of 2005 |
| M113A2 | | United States | Armoured personnel carrier | 260 | 230 M113A2, 30 M577 (CP) |
| M577 | | United States | Armoured personnel carrier | 30 | the Kuwait Army operates 30 M577 Command Post Vehicles, mostly M577A1s. Following the 1991 Gulf War a number of M577A3s were purchased from the U.S. to replace vehicles destroyed by Iraqis forces. |
| Fahd 240 | | Egypt | Armoured personnel carrier | 60 | Second largest operator in 1988. The Fahd was used by the Kuwaiti side during the invasion of Kuwait, when it lost most of them. Kuwait received more units in 1994, and had most of its captured units returned by Iraq in 1995. |
| M88A2 Hercules | | United States | Armoured recovery vehicle | 14 | 14× M88A2 in service with the Kuwait Army, and 19 more ordered from the United States. |
| M-84AI | | Poland / Yugoslavia | Armoured recovery vehicle | 15 | Polish WZT-3 built under license by Yugoslavia as M-84AI |
| Fuchs 2 NBC-RS | | Germany | NPC (Nuclear, biological, and chemical) reconnaissance | 12 | NBC vehicle |

=== Logistics and utility vehicles ===
| Name | Photo | Origin | Type | Quantity | Notes |
|---|---|---|---|---|---|
| Humvee | | United States | Multipurpose wheeled vehicle | Unknown | Vehicles sold via the U.S. Foreign Military Sales program |
| Sherpa Light Scout | | France | Multipurpose wheeled vehicle | Unknown | Initial order of 300 vehicles, for €270m in 2016, followed by further orders. |

Multiple launch rocket systems

| Name | Photo | Origin | Type | Quantity | Notes |
|---|---|---|---|---|---|
| BM-30 Smerch | | Soviet Union / Russia | Multiple rocket launcher | 27 | Purchased 1995–96 |

=== Self-propelled field artillery ===
| Name | Photo | Origin | Type | Quantity | Notes |
|---|---|---|---|---|---|
| PLZ-45 | | China | Self-propelled howitzer | 51 | (51) 27 PLZ-45s (to form a training platoon and the first battalion) ordered in 1998 and delivered in 2000–2001. 24 more howitzers (to form the second battalion) were ordered in 2001 and delivered in 2002–2003. |

=== Anti-tank ===
| Name | Origin | Type | Quantity | Notes |
|---|---|---|---|---|
| RPG-7 | Soviet Union | Rocket-propelled grenade | | |
| TOW M-901 | United States | Anti-tank guided missile | 400 | |
| M966/M966A1 | United States | TOW missile carrier | 900 | |
| TOW II | United States | Anti-tank guided missile | 82 launchers | |
| 9M113 Konkurs | Soviet Union | Anti-tank guided missile | 2,402 missiles | |
| 9K111 Fagot | Soviet Union | Anti-tank guided missile | 4,601 missiles | |
| AT-10 | Russia | Anti-tank guided missile | 1,250 missiles | |
| 9M133 Kornet | Russia | Anti-tank guided missile | | |
| Carl Gustav M3 | Sweden | Recoilless rifle | 200 | |

=== Firearms ===
| Model | Image | Origin | Type | Caliber | Notes |
Handguns
| Beretta 92 | | Italy | Handgun | 9×19mm Parabellum | |
Submachine guns
| MP5 | | Germany | Submachine gun | 9×19mm NATO | |
Rifles
| Bushmaster M4A3 | | United States | Carbine | 5.56×45mm NATO | Used by the 25th Commando Brigade. |
| M4 carbine | | United States | Carbine | 5.56×45mm NATO | |
| M16A2 | | United States | Assault rifle | 5.56×45mm NATO | |
Machine guns
| M60 machine gun | | United States | General-purpose machine gun | 7.62×51mm NATO | |
| M2 Browning | | United States | Heavy machine gun | 12.7×99mm NATO | Mostly as vehicle armament. |
Sniper rifles and designated marksman rifles
| M107/M107A1 | | United States | Anti-materiel rifle | 12.7×99mm NATO | Standard issue sniper rifle. |
Grenade launcher
| M203 grenade launcher | | United States | Grenade launcher | 40×46mm SR | |
| Anti-tank/Anti armor weapon | | | | | |
| 9M133 Kornet | | Russia | Laser-guided Anti-tank missile | 152 mm | |
| BGM-71 TOW | | United States | Wire-guided Anti-tank missile | 152 mm | |
| RPG-7 | | Soviet Union | Anti-tank rocket | | |
| M3 MAAWS | | Sweden | Anti-tank recoilless rifle | 84 mm | |

== Kuwait Army Ranks ==
His Highness, the Emir of Kuwait: Commander-in-chief of the Military of Kuwait (Arabic: القائد الأعلى للقوات المسلحة الكويتية)

His Highness, the Crown Prince of Kuwait: Deputy Commander-in-Chief of the Military of Kuwait (Arabic: نائب القائد الأعلى للقوات المسلحة الكويتية)

=== Commissioned Officers ===
| Rank group | General / flag officers | | | | Senior officers | | | Junior officers |
|---|---|---|---|---|---|---|---|---|---|---|
| Kuwait Army |
| Kuwait Army | فريق أول; Fariq 'awal | فريق; Fariq | لواء; Liwa | عميد; Amid | عقيد; Aqid | مقدم; Muqaddam | رائد; Ra'id | نقيب; Naqib | ملازم أول; Mulazim awwal | ملازم; Mulazim |

=== Enlisted ===
| Rank group | Senior NCOs | | | | Junior NCOs | Enlisted |
|---|---|---|---|---|---|---|---|
| Kuwait Army | | | | | | | No insignia |
| Kuwait Army | وكيل أول; Wakil 'awal | وكيل; Wakil | رقيب أول; Raqib 'awal | رقیب; Raqib | عريف; Earif | جندي أول; Jundiun awwal | جندي; Jundiun |

== See also ==
- Chief of the General Staff (Kuwait)
