= Fahad Al-Ahmed Al-Jaber Al-Sabah =

Kuwaiti royal and sports administrator (1945–1990)

Sheikh Fahad Al-Ahmed Al-Jaber Al-Sabah
- الشيخ فهد الأحمد الجابر الصباح

1st President of the Asian Handball Federation
- In office 26 August 1974 – 2 August 1990
- Preceded by: Position created
- Succeeded by: Ahmad Al-Fahad Al-Ahmed Al-Sabah

1st President of the Olympic Council of Asia
- In office 16 November 1982 – 2 August 1990
- Preceded by: Position created
- Succeeded by: Ahmad Al-Fahad Al-Ahmed Al-Sabah

Personal details
- Born: 10 August 1945 Kaifan, Kuwait
- Died: 2 August 1990 (aged 44) Dasman, Republic of Kuwait
- Children: 5 sons and 1 daughter: Ahmad; Talal; Athbi; Khaled; Dhari; Bibi
- Parent: Sheikh Ahmad Al-Jaber Al-Sabah (father)
- Awards: Military Service Medal, Bronze (Kuwait); Medal of Military Duty, First Class (Kuwait); Order of Military Courage, First Class (Egypt)

Military service
- Allegiance: Kuwait; Fatah
- Branch/service: Kuwait Army
- Rank: Commanding Officer
- Unit: Kuwait 25th Commando Brigade; Kuwait Emiri Guard Brigade
- Battles/wars: Six-Day War; Palestinian insurgency in South Lebanon; Invasion of Kuwait; Battle of Dasman Palace †

Sheikh Fahad Al-Ahmed Al-Jaber Al-Sabah (Arabic: الشيخ فهد الأحمد الجابر الصباح; 10 August 1945 – 2 August 1990) was a member of the Kuwaiti ruling family, a military officer, and sports administrator. He was the founder of the Asian Handball Federation and Kuwait Olympic Committee. Fahad was killed by the Iraqi military on the first day of the Iraqi invasion of Kuwait.

== Early life ==
Fahad was the son of Ahmad Al-Jaber Al-Sabah and a Baloch woman, Fatima Mohammed Albalooshi, and was educated in Kuwait for his primary and secondary schooling.

== Military career ==
Fahad was commissioned in the Kuwait Armed Forces on April 22, 1963 as an Aspirant. He pursued further military training at Sandhurst Military Academy in the United Kingdom on 30 July 30, 1964. Fahad was subsequently promoted to Second lieutenant on 19 July 1965 and First lieutenant on 1 March 1967. On 7 June 1970 he was promoted to the rank of Captain.

=== Military commands ===
- Acting commander by delegation of the 2nd Commando Battalion, Kuwait 25th Commando Brigade attached to the Yarmouk Brigade
- Staff Officer in the Kuwait Emiri Guard on 25 November 1968 in the rank of First-Lieutenant

==== Fatah membership and Six-Day War, 1967 ====
Fahad was a member of the Palestinian group Fatah when it was headquartered in Jordan and later when it moved to Lebanon. In June 1967, the Kuwait Armed Forces were engaged outside the borders of Kuwait for the first time, during the Six-Day War between Israel and four Arab countries (Egypt, Iraq, Syria and Jordan). Fahad took part in the Six-Day War attached to the Yarmouk Brigade of the Kuwait Army; as acting commander by delegation of the 2nd Commando Battalion, on the Egyptian front.

In 1971 Fahad was arrested as a fighter in Lebanon and repatriated to Kuwait.

== Olympic and sports administration career ==
=== Kuwait sports ===
- President, Kuwait Olympic Committee, 1974–1985 and 1989–1990.
- President, Qadsia Sports Club, 1969–1979.
- President, Kuwait Basketball Federation, 1974–1978.

=== Arab sports ===
- First Vice President, Arab Sports Union 1976–1990.
- First Vice- President, Arab Basketball Federation 1974–1976.

=== Asian sports ===
- President, Asian Handball Federation, 1974–1990.
- President, Asian Games Federation, 1979–1982.
- President, Olympic Council of Asia, 1982–1990.

=== International sports ===
- Vice-President, International Handball Federation, 1980–1990.
- Vice-President, Association of National Olympic Committee, 1979–1990.
- Member, International Olympic Committee, 1981–1990.
- Member, IOC Executive Board, 1985–1989.

==== 1982 World Cup incident ====
During the match against France at the 1982 FIFA World Cup, France scored a goal while some of the Kuwaiti players had stopped, having heard a whistle. The goal was initially awarded by the referee, who had not blown, but was cancelled after Fahad stepped onto the field and ordered the referee to reverse his decision. In 1988, Fahad invited Michel Platini (at the time the French football team's captain) to play for Kuwait in a preparatory match against the USSR. Platini played for 21 minutes, and was framed by the Kuwaitis as an apology for his unethical behavior six years before.

== Death ==
Fahad was killed by the Iraqi military at Dasman Palace, the primary residence of his brother, Emir Sheikh Jaber, on the first day of the Iraqi invasion of Kuwait, 2 August 1990. The exact circumstances of his death remain unclear. According to one account, he arrived late at the palace, which had been designated as a meeting point for a planned escape from Kuwait with his brother the Emir and the Crown Prince. By the time he arrived, the others had already departed, and the Iraqi forces had taken control of the palace and killed him. Another version, suggests he died while defending the palace. A further account claims he arrived at the palace, engaged in a verbal altercation with an Iraqi guard, and was subsequently shot.

== Personal life ==
Fahad was married and fathered five sons and one daughter. One of his sons, Ahmad Al-Fahad Al-Ahmed Al-Sabah, succeeded him as the president of the Olympic Council of Asia and the Asian Handball Federation, and was also a member of the International Olympic Committee.

== Honours and awards ==
=== National ===
- Military Service Medal, Bronze
- Medal of Military Duty, First Class

=== Foreign ===
- Order of military courage of Egypt, First Class
- Order of Republic of Tunisia
- Order of Republic of Yemen, First Class
- Honorary Doctorate from Helwan University, Egypt
- Olympic Gold Medal from the General Secretariat of the Cooperation Council for the Arab States of the Gulf
- Appreciation Decoration on behalf of UNESCO
- Honorary Doctorate in Law from University of Seoul, South Korea
- Honorary citizenship of Japan

== See also ==
- Military of Kuwait
- Salah Al-Zawawi
