= Mubarak al-Abdullah Joint Command and Staff College =

Military educational institution in Kuwait City

- كلية مبارك العبدالله للقيادة و الأركان المشتركة
- Established: 1995
- Location: Kuwait City, Kuwait
- Website: http://www.majcsc.gov.kw

The Mubarak al-Abdullah Joint Command and Staff College (MAJCSC) (Arabic: كلية مبارك العبدالله للقيادة و الأركان المشتركة) is a military educational institution in Kuwait City which prepares field grade officers to lead at the operational level of warfare.

== History ==
The college was established in 1995 in cooperation with Staff College, Camberley. On 18 August 1997, the college was named Mubarak al-Abdullah Command and Staff College in honor of Lieutenant General Mubarak Al-Abdullah, the former Chief of General Staff of the Kuwaiti Army during 1963 to 1980. In 2001, the college was renamed Mubarak Al-Abdullah Mubarak al-Abdullah Joint Command and Staff College. It retains connections with the British Joint Services Command and Staff College in Shrivenham, United Kingdom. In August 2008, Charles, Prince of Wales (now King Charles III) visited the college. This is the only college in the region accredited by the UK Defence Academy as delivering a course equivalent to its own Advanced Command and Staff Course.
