= 1973 Samita border skirmish =

Iraq-Kuwait border clash

1973 Samita Border Skirmish
- Part of Iraq–Kuwait relations
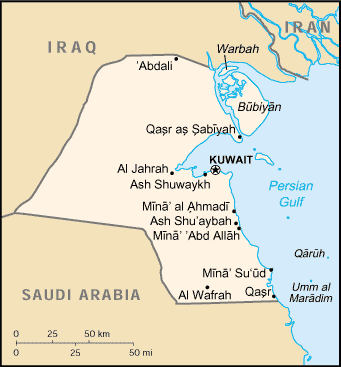
- Map of Kuwait showing Warbah Island and Bubiyan Island
Date	20 March – 9 April, 1973 (20 days)
Location	Al-Samita outpost, Kuwait
Result	See Aftermath

Belligerents
Kuwait	Iraq

Commanders and leaders
Sabah III; Mubarak Al-Sabah	Ahmed Hassan al-Bakr; Saddam Hussein

Units involved
Kuwait National Guard	Iraqi Armed Forces

Strength
Unknown	Unknown

Casualties and losses
2 killed, 4 wounded	2 killed, unknown wounded

Following the deterring effect of Operation Vantage and a coup in Iraq, Kuwait and Iraq signed a recognition draft in 1963, however the agreement, never ratified, remained non-binding and was eventually dismissed by the revolutionary council. Both countries had ongoing border disputes throughout most of the 1960s, although often restrained within the climate of Arab solidarity.

Since 1967 and during 1973, despite the unstable history between the Kuwaiti and the leadership of Iraq back then, the Kuwaiti military acted in alliance with the Iraqi military during the Six-Day War and participated with a token force during the 1973 October War of the same year.

== Background ==
In 1968 the Ba'ath party came to power in Iraq which led to raise of tensions with the Shah of Iran, as Iraq began to be viewed by the West and Iran as a Soviet-aligned rival power in the region, the situation further exacerbated following the British military withdrawal from the gulf, largely due to economic reasons, the next year and the subsequent Anglo-American backing of the Shah to be the "policeman" of the gulf. In early 1969 the Iraqi-Iranian relations had deteriorated to the point that war between the two countries seemed imminent. To protect Umm Qasr from a potential Iranian attack, Iraq pressured Kuwait into accepting a small Iraqi force to be stationed inside its territory, which Iraq considered to be disputed. However the impending conflict between Iraq and Iran never reached its breaking point. Nevertheless, Iraq maintained its forces in Kuwaiti territory on the grounds that Umm Qasr was still in need of defence until the dispute is resolved with Iran.

Throughout this period older border disputes between Iraq and Kuwait re-emerged, as Iraq demanded the islands of Warbah and Bubiyan to be ceded to it while rejecting Kuwaiti negotiations to settle the dispute otherwise. Iraq viewed the ceding of the islands to it as a concession, to remedy its geographically vulnerable position, in exchange of relinquishing its historical claim on the whole of Kuwait.

Kuwait rejection of Iraqi demands can also be linked to its fear of antagonising the Shah of Iran who desired to be the "policeman" of the gulf, as ceding the islands would've strengthened Iraq's position over the gulf.

In December 1971 Iraq amassed its troops on its border with Kuwait. Kuwait unsuccessfully tried to neutralise Iraqi hostility through financial support, however Iraq impatient continued to grow. In December 1972 Iraq reinforced a garrison inside of Kuwaiti territory and in February of the next year Kuwait reinforced its al-Samita outpost.

== 1973 border skirmish ==
On 20 March 1973 Iraqi troops erected a defensive post near al-Samita Kuwaiti post which led to protests by Kuwaitis and eventually broke into a fire fight. Iraqi troops expelled Kuwaiti forces and occupied the post. Kuwait responded by declaring a state of emergency, closing its borders and appealing to the Arab League for help.

== Aftermath ==
On 22 March Kuwait sent a note of protest to Iraq and asked for the withdrawal of the Iraqi force beyond the Kuwaiti border, Iraq rejected the contention and reminded the Kuwaiti government that the border between the two countries was never formally agreed upon. Kuwait sent another note inviting Iraq to discuss the dispute and warned that the issue would be transferred to the Arab League otherwise. The secretary general of the Arab League, joined by Saudi and Syrian representatives, went to Baghdad and Kuwait in April 1973 and offered the League's offices to resolve the conflict peacefully. While the Iraqi government agreed to withdraw its troops from the al-Samita post on 9 April, it stated that the frontier dispute was a matter of direct negotiation between the two countries and none of the other states' concern. Iraq also refused Kuwait's request to withdraw its force from Kuwaiti territory; the withdrawal only happened in mid-1977 during an overall warming of relations between the two countries.

== See also ==
- Al Jahra Force
