= Operation Vantage =

Defensive british military operation to protect Kuwaiti independence

Operation Vantage 1961
- Part of Iraq-Kuwait relations and the 1961 Independence of Kuwait
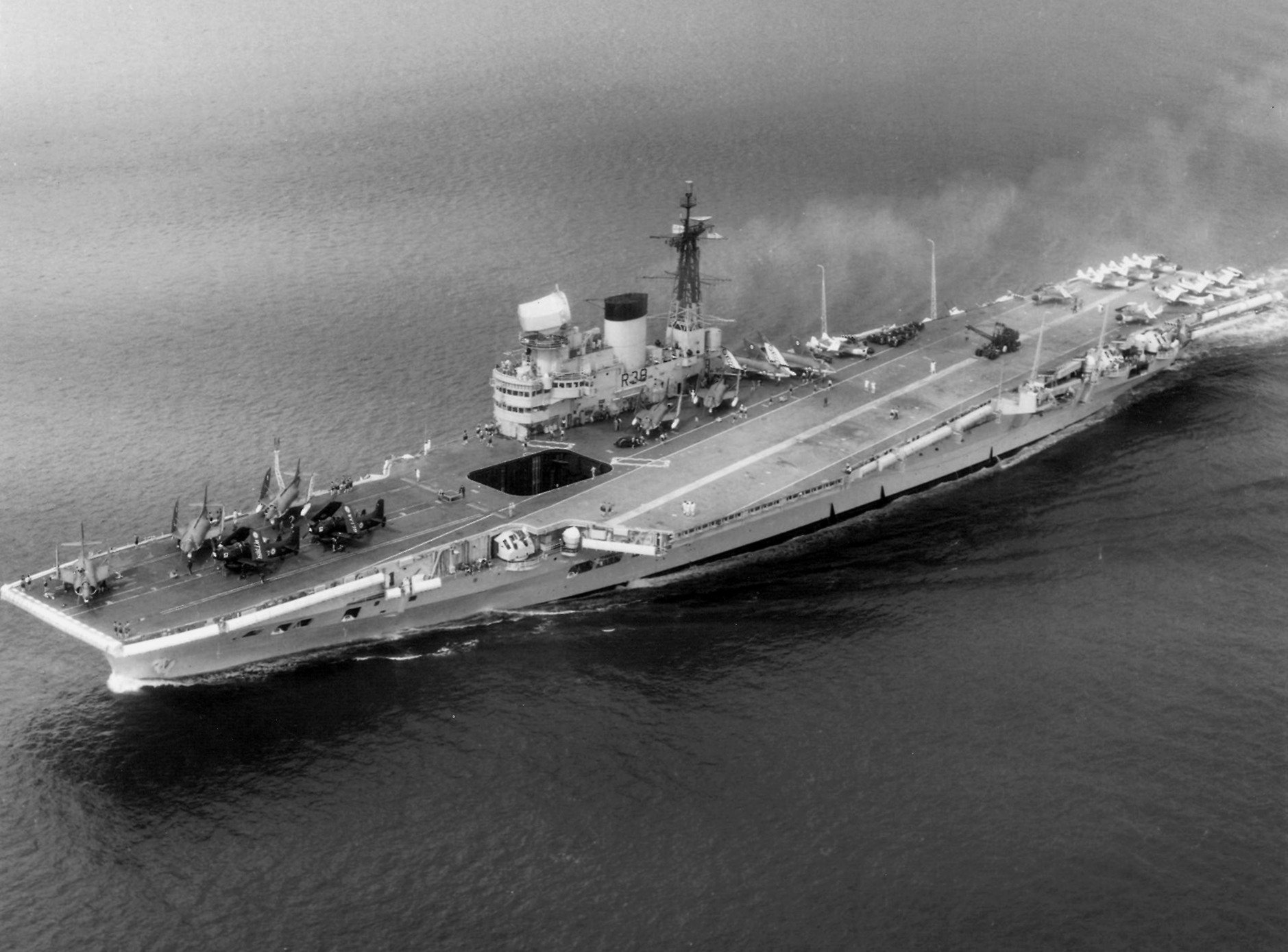
- HMS Victorious taking part in Operation Vantage in support of Kuwait in July 1961.
Date	1 July – 19 October 1961
Location	Kuwait
Result	Bilateral withdrawal to demarcation line set by the Arab League

Belligerents
Kuwait; United Kingdom	Iraq

Commanders and leaders
Abdullah Al-Salim Al-Sabah; Mubarak Abdullah Al-Jaber Al-Sabah; Saleh Mohammed Al-Sabah (United Kingdom) Harold Macmillan (United Kingdom) Louis Mountbatten, 1st Earl Mountbatten of Burma (United Kingdom) Brigadier Derek Horsford	Abd al-Karim Qasim

Strength
HM's British Armed Forces Kuwait Army, Air Force	Iraqi Armed Forces

Operation Vantage was a British military operation in 1961 to support the newly independent state of Kuwait against territorial claims by its neighbour, Iraq. The UK reacted to a call for protection from Sheikh Abdullah III Al-Salim Al-Sabah of Kuwait, and air, sea and land forces were in place within days. Iraq did not attack and the British forces were replaced by the Arab League. Following a coup in Iraq, the new government recognised Kuwaiti independence in 1963, although it was never ratified thus remained unbinding and was later rejected by the revolutionary command leading to more border disputes in the future.

== Background ==
In 1958, Abdul Karim Qasim seized power in Iraq. He was seen by western powers as unpredictable and Iraq as unstable. On 25 June 1961, following Britain's relinquishing authority in Kuwait, Qasim announced that Kuwait would be incorporated into Iraq and the military threat was seen, by Britain, as imminent. The reasons for Iraqi belligerence are debatable, but as well as the political gain to be accrued from a successful military campaign, Kuwait's assets at the time included possible oil reserves (confirmed later) and secure access to the sea, which Iraq lacked.

== Operation ==
After borders were sealed and defense mounted by Mubarak Abdullah Al-Jaber Al-Sabah and his deputy Colonel Sheikh Saleh Mohammed Al-Sabah against the anticipated invasion, Brigadier General Sheikh Mubarak advised Kuwait's 11th ruler and 1st emir, Sheikh Abdullah III Al-Salim Al-Sabah, to invoke Section 4 of the independence agreement, which stated that Kuwait could ask Britain for military support, which was done on 30 June 1961.

Britain had accepted responsibility for Kuwait's military protection and quickly sent a strong naval task force, which included Royal Marines from 42 Commando on HMS Bulwark, aircraft carrier HMS Victorious (subsequently relieved by HMS Centaur), destroyers HMS Camperdown, HMS Finisterre, HMS Saintes and HMS Cassandra, frigates HMS Chichester, HMS Loch Fyne, HMS Loch Ruthven, HMS Loch Insh, HMS Llandaff, HMS Yarmouth, and HMS Lincoln, amphibious landing ship HMS Messina, and the 108th Minesweeper Squadron.

The Royal Air Force sent 2 Canberra Reconnaissance aircraft, of 13 Squadron based in Cyprus, which flew daily sorties to photograph the border.

A troop of 42 Commando arrived by helicopter from Bulwark at the airport as a squadron of Hawker Hunters arrived. By 1 July Britain had half of a brigade group in Kuwait ready for action. These included 42 and 45 Marine Commandos and two companies of 2nd Coldstream Guards. 3rd Carabiniers' "C" squadron landed with their Centurion tanks from HMS Striker. The two Commando groups occupied high ground on and around Mitla Ridge, near the Iraqi border, in fierce summer heat. Brigadier Derek Horsford, Commander, 24th Infantry Brigade Group was rushed from Kenya to Kuwait to take command of the assembled British land forces.

In the following days, there were further reinforcements; an artillery battery of the 33rd Parachute Field Regiment, and the 11th Hussars with Ferret scout cars; 2nd Battalion, The Parachute Regiment arrived after a delay through difficulties over-flying Turkey. On 4 July, the 1st Battalion, Royal Inniskilling Fusiliers and the 34th Field Squadron arrived from Kenya. The Inniskillings and the 1st Battalion, The King's Regiment (Manchester and Liverpool) relieved 42 and 45 Commandos on 6 and 7 July. There were more reinforcements from the UK.

The Kuwaiti combat contingent was led by Brigadier General Mubarak and Colonel Saleh Mohammed Al-Sabah who later commanded the Kuwait 25th Commando Brigade and the Kuwait 6th Mechanized Brigade.

== Aftermath ==
The Arab League took over the protection of Kuwait and the British had withdrawn their forces by 19 October. Qasim was killed in a coup in 1963 and the new regime signed recognition agreement with Kuwait that remained unratified and was later declared unconstitutional, and subsequently cancelled. Regardless of the political situation, the military threat was perceived to be reduced, Britain continued to monitor the situation and kept forces available to protect Kuwait until 1971. There had been no Iraqi military action against Kuwait at the time: this was attributed to the political and military situation within Iraq which continued to be unstable.

== See also ==
- Gulf War
  - Iraqi invasion of Kuwait
- Kuwait-Iraq 1973 Sanita border skirmish
- Iraq–Kuwait border
- United Nations Iraq-Kuwait Observation Mission (April 1991- October 2003)
