= Kullaba =

Ancient Near Eastern archaeological site

Anu district

Kullaba (also Kulaba, Kulab, and Kullab) was a city in the ancient Near East which was later largely absorbed into the city of Uruk. There was also a district of the city of Babylon named Kullab, known to contain a temple of Šarrat-Larsa ("Queen of Larsa") called Emekiliburur. It has been suggested that in Neo-Babylonian times there were two localities named Kullaba, with one being at Uruk, in addition to the district in Babylon.

At the archaeological site of Warka there are two main mounds with occupation. They were originally separated by an ancient waterway which was improved into a canal. By the beginning of the Early Dynastic period (c. 2900 BC) the western polity was known as Kullaba (where the earliest archaeological layers dating back to the Ubaid period) and 0.5 kilometers away the southeastern polity was known as Unug. Kullaba is now generally taken as a district on the city of Uruk but at least until the end of the Ur III period (c. 2000 BC) and possibly at later times it was a separate entity. The Kullaba mound became the site for what became called the Anu Ziggurat and the White Temple beginning in the late 4th millennium BC Uruk IV and majorly rebuilt in the Uruk III period, and the Irigal and Bit-Resh in the 1st millennium BC. In the Uruk IV period an unusual underground cult installation, dubbed the Steingebaude was also constructed at Kuballa. In the Uruk III (Jemdat Nasr) period the entire site of Warka, 600 hectares in area at that time, was encompassed in a city wall. That event is traditionly, based on literary compositions, ascribed to Gilgamesh.

In an alternative view it has been suggested that Kullaba referred to the central district of Uruk, where the temple Eanna of Inanna was located and that the western area was possibly called KI.KAL^{ki}.

== History ==
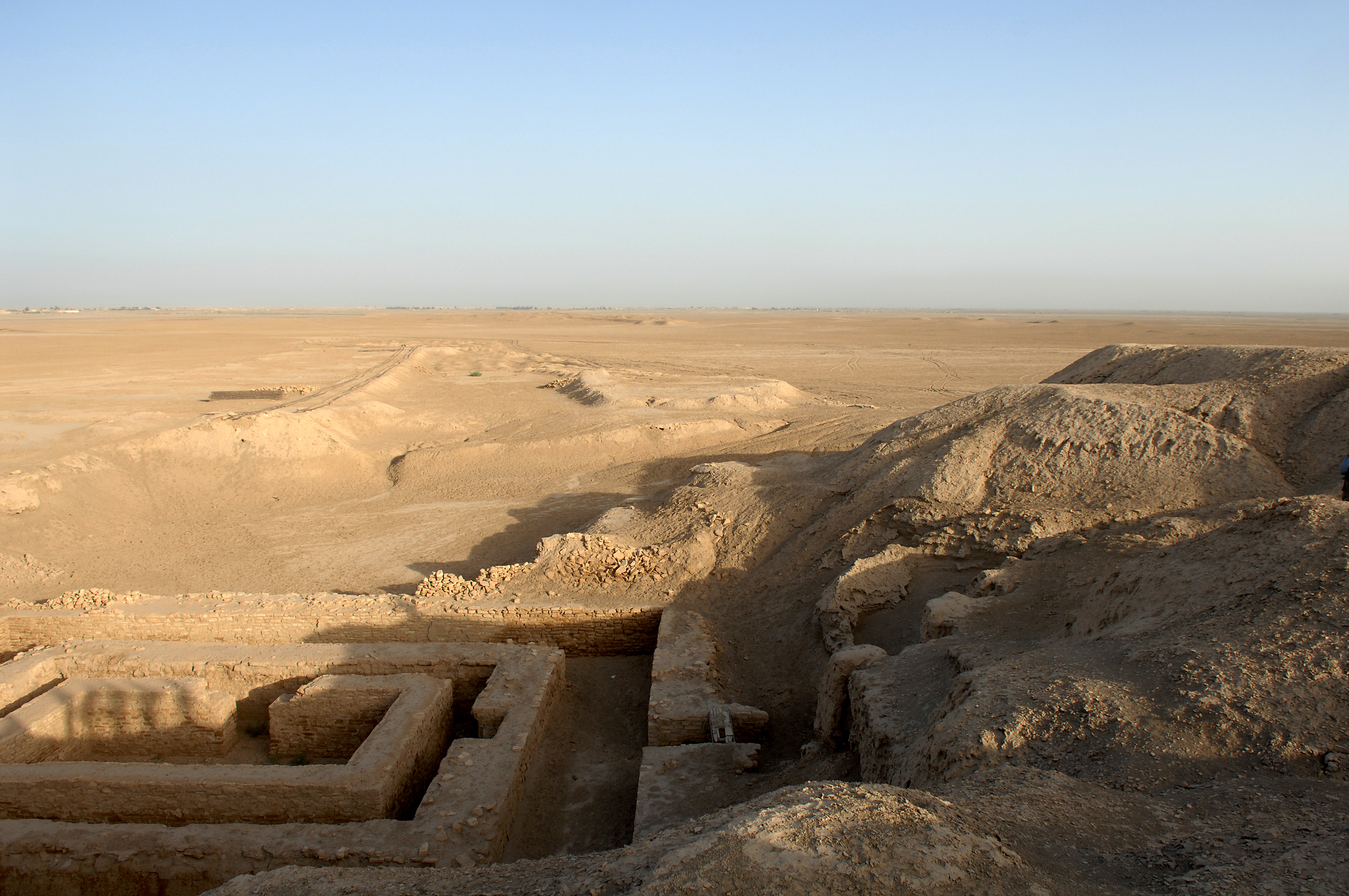
Uruk Archaealogical site at Warka

Pottery and building foundations at Kullaba date back to the Late Ubaid and Terminal Ubaid periods (1st half of the 4th millennium BC). The occupation picture for early periods at Uruk is clouded because the original excavators only dug a single deep sounding, beginning at the Uruk V (c. 3500 BC) layer, which after 19 meters reached virgin soil but at that point only had a width of 1.5 meters. More recent excavations have uncovered remains of monumental Ubaid period construction.

In the Uruk IV period a number of structures were built there, mostly now with only the foundations remaining. These structures were built on top of a platform whose construction began in the Ubaid period. A notable building was the underground Steingebäude (Stone Building) constructed with a series of concentric walls encompassing an area of 27 meter by 32 meters and a sloping ramp going underground as its entrance. The building's stone floor had a stone and plaster pedestal with 5 holes forming a square and walls were of bitumen mortared limestone. The Uruk IV construction has been radiocarbon dated to c. 3450 BC.

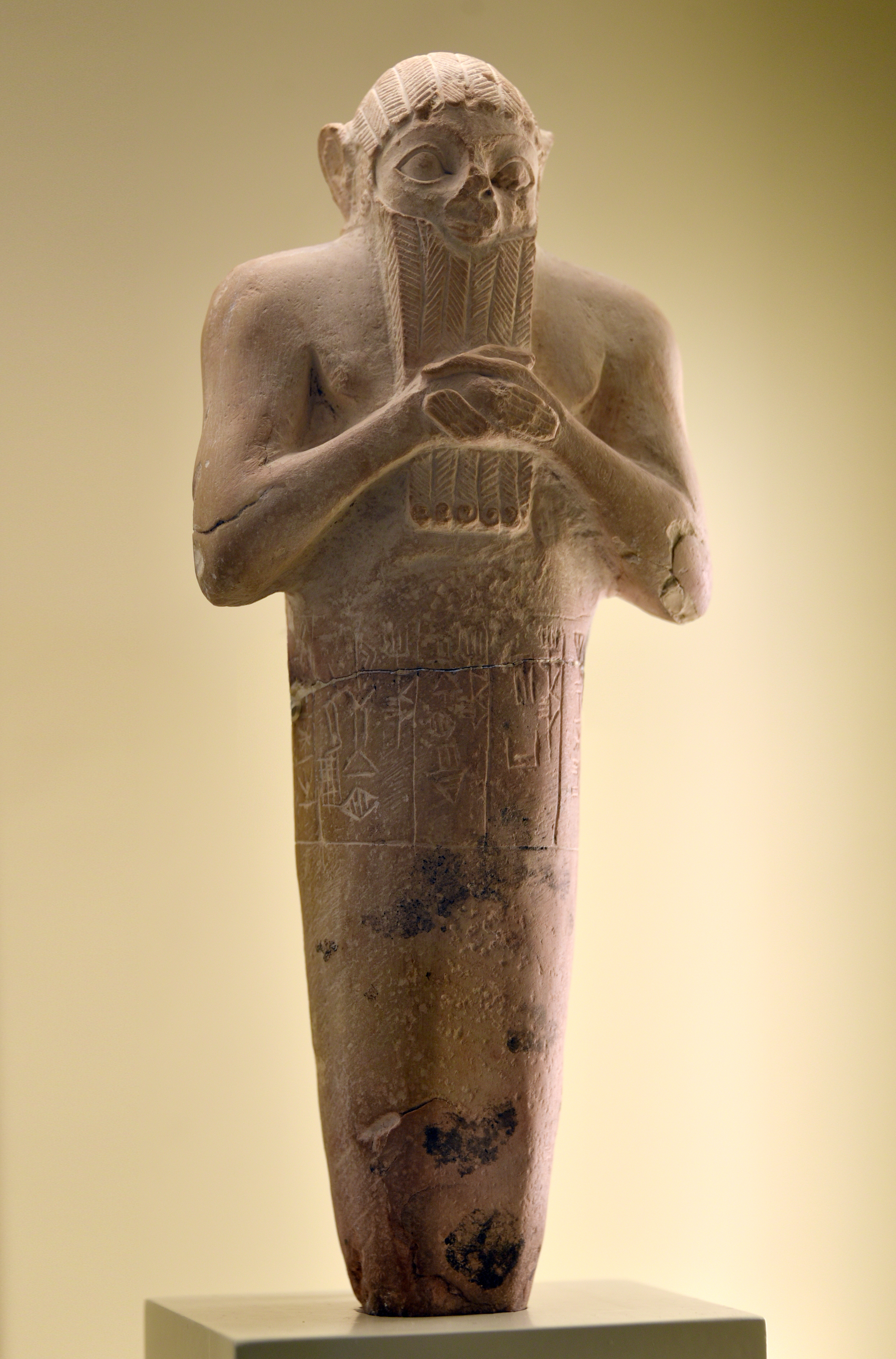
Foundation peg of Lugal-kisal-si, king of Uruk, Ur and Kish, circa 2380 BC. The inscription reads "For (goddess) Namma, wife of (the god) An, Lugalkisalsi, King of Uruk, King of Ur, erected this temple of Namma". Pergamon Museum VA 4855

In the Uruk III period all earlier structures were dismantled down to the 50 cm foundations and the area leveled (with fill not from the original structures and including discarded proto-cuneiform tablets) then a huge platform constructed and all new structures built on to of that. A notable Uruk III building was the White Temple. The White Temple was a 24 meter by 19 meter buttressed and niched tripartite structure with a "freestanding central offering table and a corner podium" and with four adjoining rooms on each side, built on a large four course bitumen and mudbrick base terrace. Adjacent to the White Temple was the "Old Terrace" with an area of 173 meters by 200 meters. The terrace was accessed by a long staircase. It was plastered with white-washed clay and the outer walls bore two bands of bottle shaped clay cones as decoration. In one foundation corner the "skeletal remains of a leopard and a lion were found buried in a mudbrick box". The remaining walls are up to 3 meters high and the building is thought to have originally had a 6-meter height. It lay on top of a number of prior structures (22 archaeological levels were found) which had raised the height of its terrace to 13 meters, leading to it having sometimes been incorrectly termed a ziggurat, often called the "Anu Ziggurat". The idea that the White temple complex was dedicated to Anu stems from the fact that this was the case in Neo-Assyrian times, almost three millennia later.

After the Uruk period, Uruk and the Kullaba area with it, declined in influence and population and any development favored the southeastern Enanna (Unug) half of the site especially in the Ur III Empire period. The Kullaba area had a resurgence in the late 3rd millennium under ruler Utu-hengal and for a time under the Old Babylonian period (1st half of 2nd millennium BC) Sixth dynasty of Uruk when Sîn-kāšid built a large palace on the far northwestern part of Kullaba and ruler Rîm-Anum constructed a nearby facility for housing and employing prisoners of war.

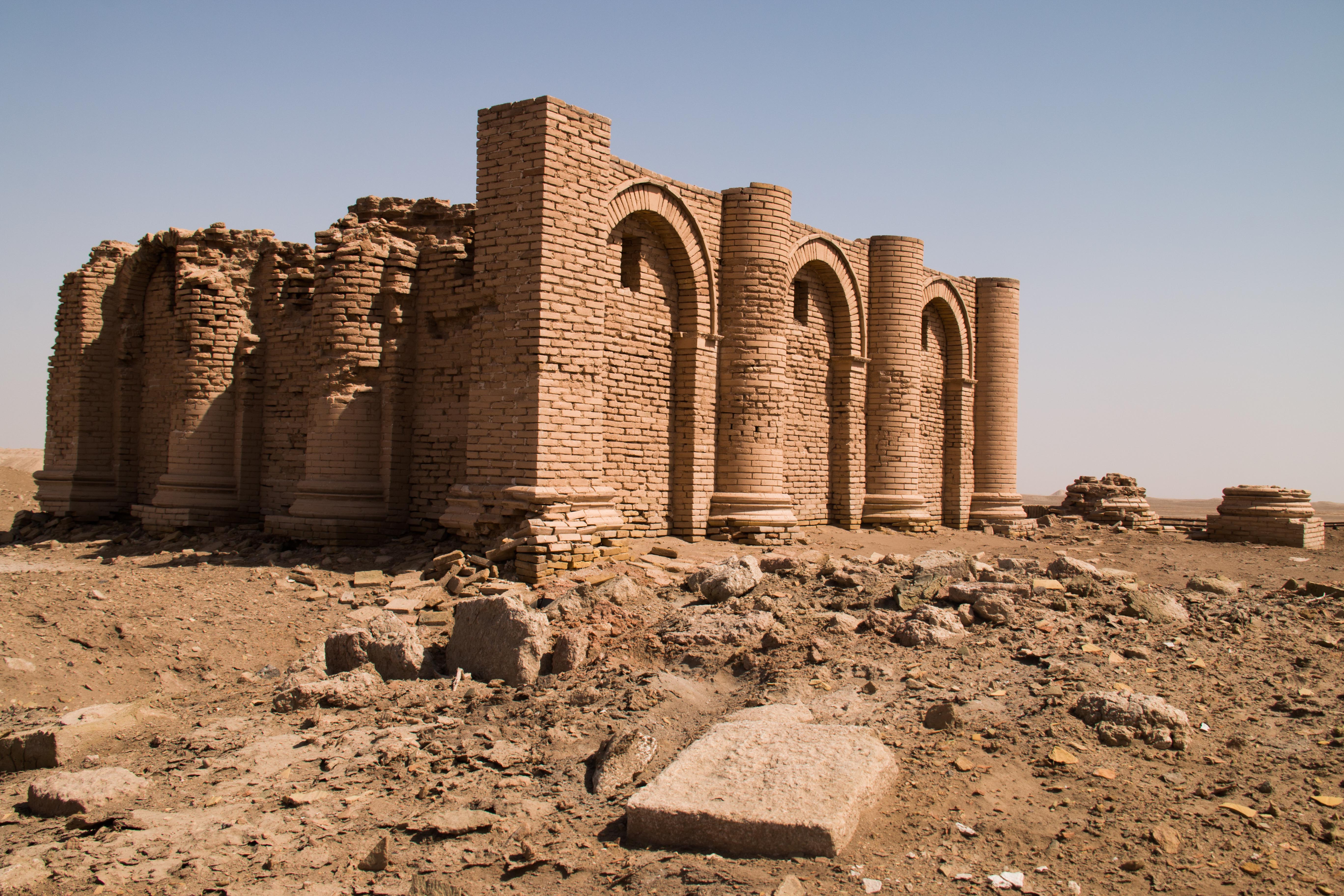
Ruins of the Temple of Gareus at Uruk, c. 100 CE

In the Neo-Assyrian period the "Old Terrace" was restored and ruler Esarhaddon built a mudbrick mantle around the mound supporting the White Temple. The Kullaba area again saw notable use in the later part of the 1st millennium BC in the Hellenistic period. Much of the older archaeological areas are unavailable because of the enormous Seleucid period Bit-Resh complex (built in 244 BC, enlarged in 205 BC, burned down in 131 BC) of the god Anu and his consort Antum where 158 cuneiform tablets were found during excavations. A classical period Mithraeum (temple to the god Mithras) was built between the Bit-Resh and Ištar's cult center Irigal (Ešgal) where Ninirigal was also worshiped and a Parthian era Temple of Gareus in the far southeastern area of Kullaba.

== Historical sources ==
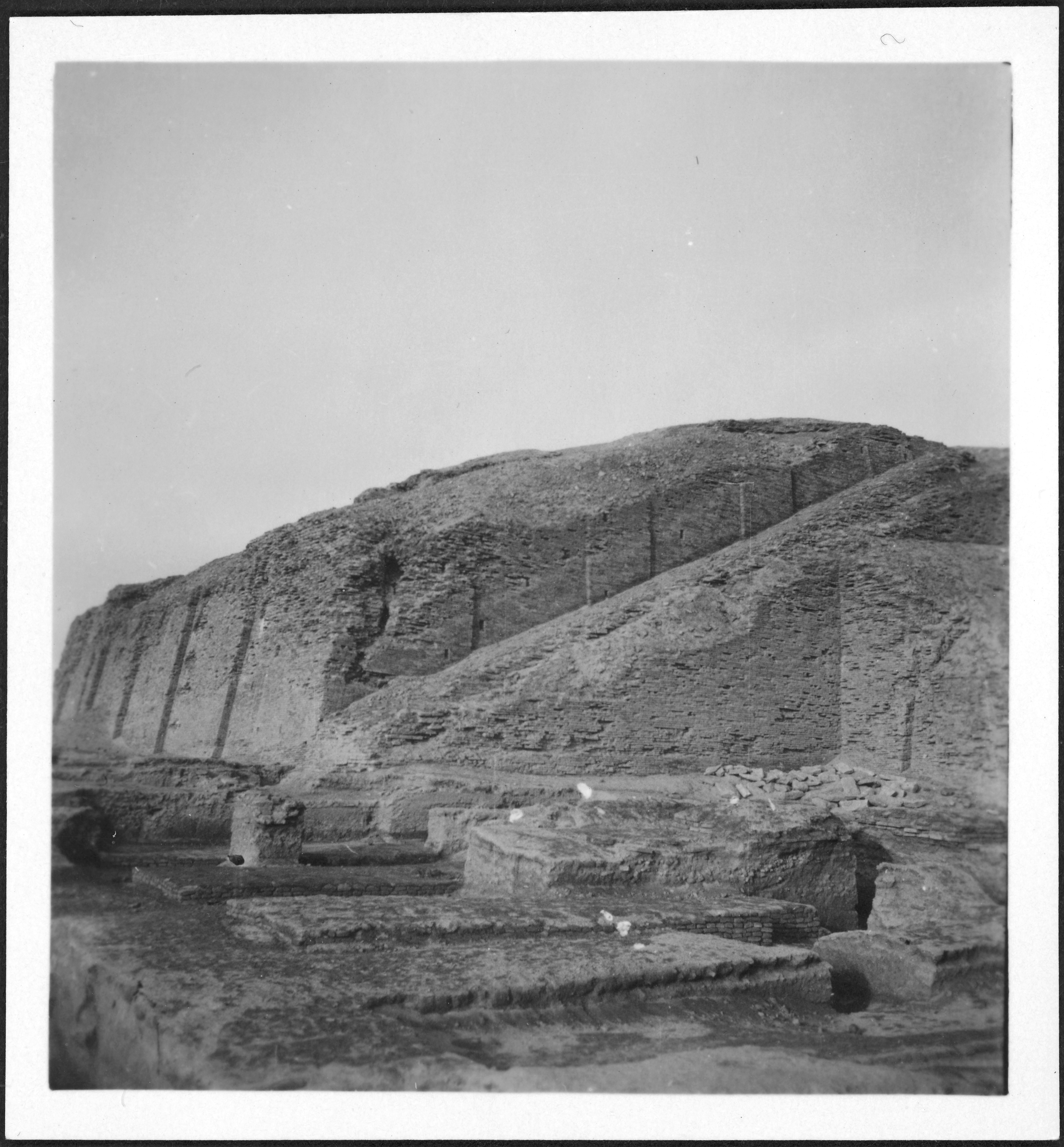
Ziggurat at Uruk

Two texts found in Early Dynastic period Lagash contained personal names based on Kullaba, Me-Kul-ab_{4}^{ki}-ta "From the divine forces of Kulaba".

The last pre-Sargonic source for the city was in the Early Dynastic IIIa period (c. 2600-2500 BC) in a text found at Shuruppak listing polities controlled by Uruk under ruler Lumma. A number of other Shuruppak texts from that period mention Kullaba (as GIŠ-[KUN]-Kul-aba_{4}^{ki}).

In the victory stele of Utu-hengal (c. 2119 – c. 2112 BC), the only member of the Fifth dynasty of Uruk, he stated "The citizens of Uruk and the citizens of Kullab he caused to rejoice at this."

In the Sumerian king list, which straddles the line between historic source and literary composition, written in various rescensions from the Ur III period to the Old Babylonian period, Gigamesh is called "the lord of Kulaba".

=== Iron Age ===
Uruk in the Seleucid period

In the annals of Neo-Assyrian ruler Sennacherib (705–681 BC) the list of cities conquered in his first campaign, in Babylonia, begins "Uruk, Larsa, Ur, Eridu, Kulaba, Kissik, Nemed-Laguda". Neo-Assyrian ruler Esarhaddon (681–669 BC) granted andurāru-status (a periodic reinstatement of goods and persons, alienated because of want, to their original status) to Dēr, Ur, Uruk, Eridu, Larsa, Kullab, Kisik, and Nemed-Laguda. It is not clear if this is the same city after the gap of more than a millennium but the areal location is correct.

In the Seleucid period (312–63 BC) an Anu-uballiṭ (also known as Kephalon), whose position has been speculated to be ruler or priest, reported rebuilding the 198 by 205 meter Irigal sanctuary of Anu and Inanna. The presiding deity was a "Gasan-irigal, Mother of Kullaba".

== Literary sources ==
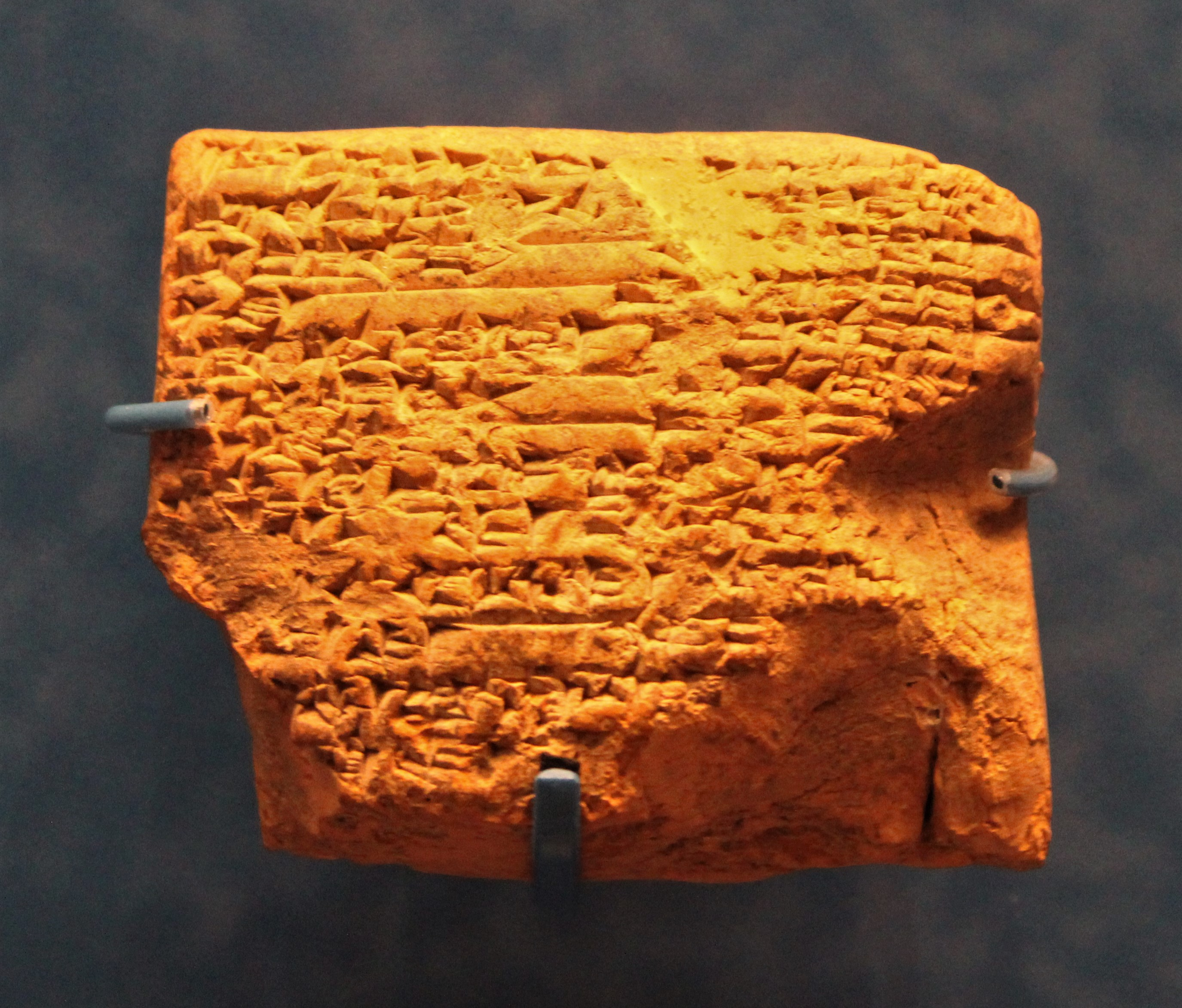
Enmerkar and the Lord of Aratta.

In Enmerkar and Ensuhgiranna:

"This fastness, thrusting high above the azure plain around,This city Kullab, sprouting tall from earth to sky,This Uruk, whose very name gleams like the rainbow, Radiating across heaven with its multicolored glow, Standing bright against the sky, like the shining curve of the new moon."

In Inanna and Enki it refers to Kullaba several times including "My lady, today you have brought the Boat of Heaven to the Gate of Joy, to Unug Kulaba. Now there will be rejoicing in our city, now there will be rejoicing in our city ..." In Enki and the world order "Inana the mistress, the lady of the great powers who allows sexual intercourse in the open squares of Kulaba".

The Early Dynastic period 3rd Temple Hymn, found at Abu Salabikh, referred to the temple of Inanna e_{2}-sig_{4} kul-aba. The deified ruler Lugalbanda was worshiped at Kullaba.

One of the Temple hymns written by the daughter of Sargon of Akkad is about the E-Ana temple of Inanna in Kullaba: "Home to the mighty powers of Kulaba. Your court lets the great shrines grow, fresh green fruit that is filled with pleasure and delight...

In a Poem about Ĝeštinana it states "... Ah, you are the maiden of Uruk, You are the young child of Bad-Tibira, You are the daughter-in-law of Uruk, You are the nurse of Kulaba ...".

Kullaba is mentioned in A song of Šulgi and in Hymn X of Shulgi, a ruler of the Ur III Empire, it states (karkullab.ak.e), "at the quay of Kullab". In the Lugalbanda and the Anzud Bird epic it reads "There and then did my noble sister, radiant Inanna, Choose me by name in her holy heart and, from the Shupar Mountain, Indeed bring me into the brick-walled city of Kulaba." Kullaba features prominently in Lugalbanda in the Mountain Cave including "when the offices of en and king were famously exercised at Unug, when the sceptre and staff of Kulaba were held high in battle -- in battle, Inana's game".

In Enmerkar and En-suhgir-ana the text states "if my city becomes a ruin mound, then I will be a potsherd of it, but I will never submit to the lord of Unug, the lord of Kulaba".

In the literary composition Lugalbanda and Úurrum it states "Inanna, if only this were my home, if only this were my city! If only this were Kulaba, the city in which my mother bore (me) ...".

In an Isin-Larsa period hymn to Isin ruler Ishme-Dagan (c. 1953-1935 BC) it reads "That I care unceasingly for Eanna, thick like a bull, in the land of Uruk, That my aura envelopes Kulaba ...".

Kullaba appears several times in the composition Enmerkar and the Lord of Aratta including "The king of Kulaba applied his hand to clay and stamped the message as if with a seal. Before that time no one had ever written down words on a tablet, But now, under the sun of this very day, indeed it was so!The king of Kulaba wrote down words on a tablet, indeed it was so.". In another reference, in a message sent to the Lord of Aratta, "in Kulaba, the all-important country which deserves great honor ... let me repeat it to my king, the Lord of Kulaba." Also "He had it loaded on the pack-asses at whose sides reserve donkeys were placed. The king, the lord of broad wisdom, the lord of Unug, the lord of Kulaba, despatched them directly to Aratta". Arratta is thought to have been on the Iranian Plateau.

The epic Gilgamesh and Aga, calls Gilgamesh the Lord (en) of Kullaba saying "Gilgamesh en of Kulaba, who trusts in Inanna, did not approve the word city's Elders". In Gilamesh and the Land of the Living (formerly known as Gilgamesh and Huwawa) it states "0 Gilgamesh lord son of Kullab how long wilt thou lie?". Kullaba is mentioned in Gilgameš and the Bull of Heaven, Gilgameš and Ḫuwawa, and a number of times in The Death of Gilgameš including "Unug's levy was a flood, Kulaba's levy was a clouded sky". In the literary composition Gilgamesh, Enkidu, and the Netherworld it states "The young men and the maidens of Uruk, the dignitaries and the matrons of Kulaba. Were looking at their statues and were rejoicing." In the prologue it reads "When the offices of en-ship and kingship have been made manifest in Uruk, When the scepter and the staff of Kulaba had been raised in battle,".

Kulabba is also mentioned in the Zame Hymns.

== See also ==
- Ancient City Seals
- Cities of the ancient Near East
- List of Mesopotamian deities
