= Enmerkar and En-suhgir-ana =

Text in Sumerian mythology and literature

Enmerkar and En-suhgir-ana (also known as Enmerkar and Ensuhkešdanna) is a text in Sumerian literature appearing as a sequel to Enmerkar and the Lord of Aratta, and is second in a series of four accounts describing the contests of Aratta against Enmerkar, lord of Unug and Kullaba, and his successor Lugalbanda, father of Gilgamesh.

== Synopsis ==
The name of the Lord of Aratta, which never appeared in Enmerkar and the Lord of Aratta, is here provided in a brief introduction. Among scholars, the earlier cuneiform reading of this name, Ensuhgirana, is still used alongside the more recent reading of it as Ensuhkeshdanna. The introduction also gives the name of Ensuhkeshdanna's chief minister, Ansigaria, and Enmerkar's chief minister, Namena-tuma. Enmerkar is the Lord of both Unug and Kulaba, described as the "city which rises from heaven to earth" [sic].

Following this introduction, the plot opens with Ensuhkeshdanna dictating a message to his envoy, to be taken to Unug, demanding Enmerkar submit to Aratta, and boasting that his connections with the goddess Inanna are superior to those of Enmerkar.

The envoy having traveled to Unug and delivered this message, Enmerkar responds that Inanna stays at the temple with him, and that she will not even go to Aratta for five or ten years; he responds to Ensuhkeshdanna's boasts with a number of creative sexual taunts of his own ("even though she is not a duckling, she shrieks like one").

When the messenger returns to Aratta with this message, Ensuhkeshdanna is perplexed and feels defeated. His counselors advise him to back off from confrontation with Enmerkar. However, he vows never to submit to Enmerkar, even if Aratta be utterly destroyed.

At this point, a sorcerer named Urgirinuna comes to Aratta, after his homeland of Hamazi has been vanquished. Urgirinuna promises the chief minister, Ansigaria, that he can make Enmerkar submit to Aratta. Ansigaria agrees to fund this mission, and the sorcerer then proceeds to Eresh, the city of Nisaba, where he somehow manages to sabotage the dairy livestock of Enmerkar.

This act of the sorcerer's sabotage was observed by the livestock keepers, Mashgula and Uredina, who then pray to Utu, the sun god, for help. A sorceress of Eresh called "Wise Woman Sagburu" then appears, and outperforms Urgirinuna's sorcery in a series of contests: each time Urgirinuna magically brings an animal from the water by casting in fish eggs, she brings a predator from the water in the same way, which then eats the animals he produces. Having defeated him with superior magic, she refuses to spare his life, and casts him into the Euphrates.

When Ensuhkeshdanna hears of this, he admits defeat and submits to Enmerkar. The remainder of the text is too fragmentary to interpret.

== Sources ==
- Enmerkar and En-suḫgir-ana at the Electronic Text Corpus of Sumerian Literature
- Attinger, P. (1984). "Remarques a Propos de la " Malédiction d'Accad "". Revue d'Assyriologie et d'archéologie orientale (in French). 78 (2): 99–121. ISSN 0373-6032. JSTOR 23282271.
- Mittermayer, Catherine (2009). Enmerkara und der Herr von Arata: ein ungleicher Wettstreit (in German). Saint-Paul. ISBN 978-3-525-54359-7.
