= Dasman =

Dasman دسمان
- District
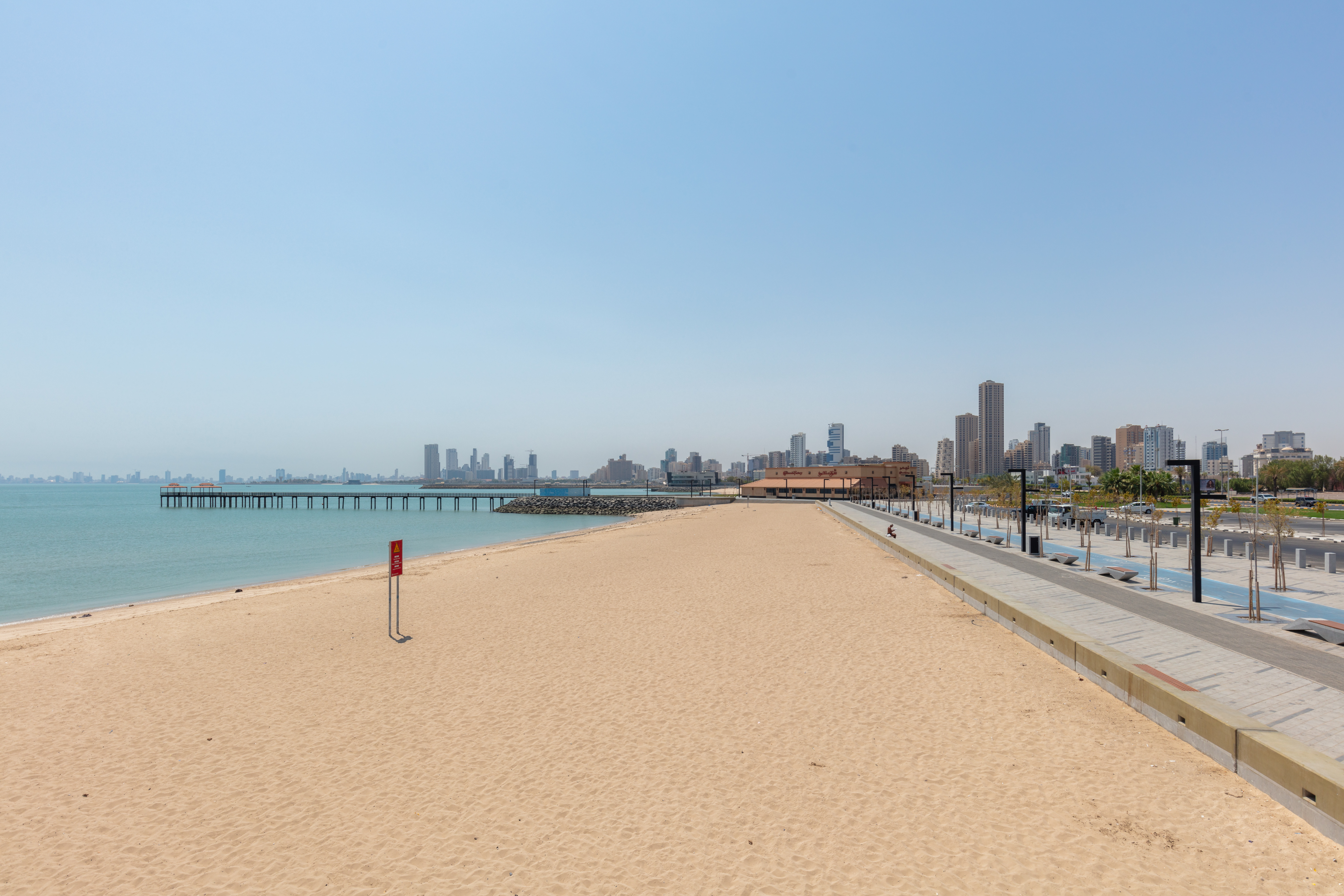
- Dasman Beach

- Location within Kuwait
- Coordinates: 29°23′13″N 47°59′58″E
- Country: Kuwait
- Governorate: Capital Governorate

Population (2022)
  - Total: 2,020

Dasman (Arabic: دسمان, romanized: Dasmān) is a seaside district of Kuwait City in Kuwait. It is notable for hosting the Dasman Palace, which previously housed members of the House of Al Sabah and was the site of the Battle of Dasman Palace in 1990 during the Gulf War. Another historic palace is located in the district: the Sheikh Abdullah Al-Jabir Palace, which currently occupies the tentative list of UNESCO World Heritage Sites.
