= Ujayli =

Ujayli. is a surname. Notable people with the surname include:

- Shahla Ujayli (born 1976), Syrian writer
- Abdul Salam al-Ujayli (1918–2006), Syrian doctor
- Najim Abdallah Zahwen Al Ujayli, Iraqi general
