= Battle of Rumaila =

Engagement that took place on March 2, 1991

- Part of the Gulf War (aftermath)
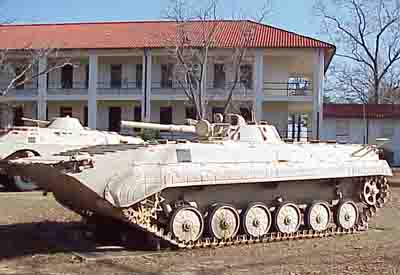
- Armored personnel carriers captured in the Euphrates Valley of Iraq presented to the United States Army Infantry School by the 24th Infantry Division (Mechanized) in 1991
Date	2 March 1991
Location	Lake Hammar, Iraq 30.8562582°N 46.9184875°E
Result	American victory

Belligerents
United States	Iraq

Commanders and leaders
(United States) Norman Schwarzkopf (United States) Frederick Franks (United States) Barry McCaffrey	(Ba'athist Iraq) Iyad Futayyih

Units involved
(United States) 24th Infantry Division	(Iraq) 1st Hammurabi Armored Division

Strength
25,000 troops 241 M1 Abrams tanks 221 M2 Bradley armored fighting vehicles 94 helicopters	Estimated 7,000 troops 300 tanks 700 wheeled vehicles

Casualties and losses
1 wounded 1 M1 Abrams tank destroyed 1 IFV destroyed	700+ killed 3,000 captured 247–360 tanks & armoured vehicles destroyed 400+ trucks destroyed 33 – 43 artillery pieces destroyed 8 MRLs destroyed 4 helicopters shot down
- The Hammar Marshes inside Iraq

The Battle of Rumaila, also known as the Battle of the Causeway or the Battle of the Junkyard, was a controversial attack that took place on March 2, 1991, two days after President Bush declared a ceasefire, near the Rumaila oil field in the Euphrates Valley of southern Iraq, when the U.S. Army forces, mostly the 24th Infantry Division under Major General Barry McCaffrey engaged and nearly annihilated a large column of withdrawing Iraqi Republican Guard armored forces during the immediate aftermath of the Gulf War.

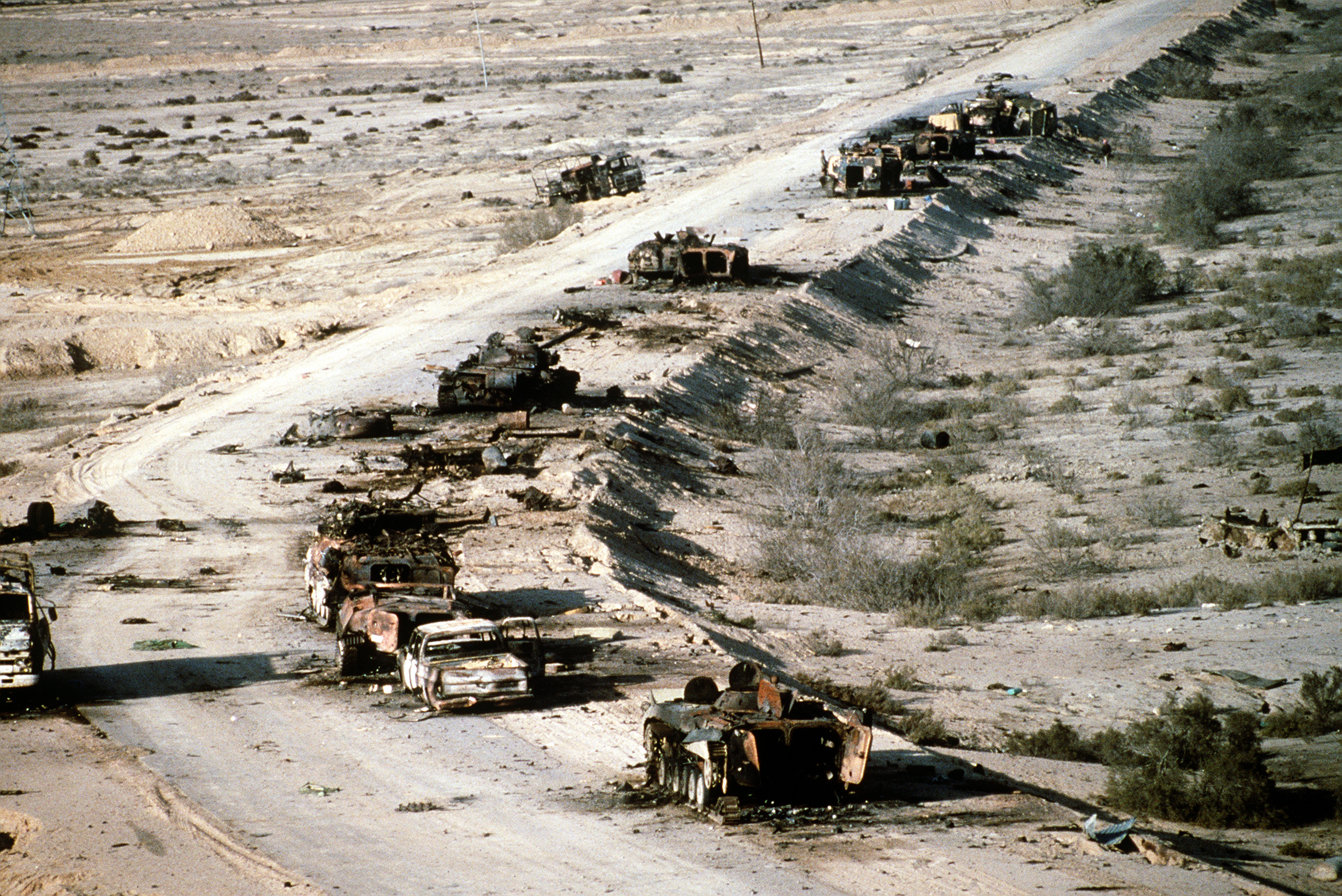
Aerial view of an Iraqi column consisting of a T-72 tank, several BMP-1 and Type 63 armored vehicles, and trucks on Highway 8 destroyed at the Battle of Rumaila, March 1991

== Prior actions to Rumaila ==
On 26 February, the 24th Infantry Division advanced through the valley and captured Iraqi airfields at the Battle for Jalibah Airfield and Tallil. While moving through Objective Gold, a large logistics center between Tallil on the west and Jalibah airfield on the east, the 24th Infantry Division found 1,700 bunkers full of munitions, weapons, petroleum and other war stocks. At the airfields, it encountered entrenched resistance from the Iraqi 37th and 49th Infantry Divisions, as well as the 6th Nebuchadnezzar Mechanised Division of the Iraqi Republican Guard. Despite some of the most fierce resistance of the war, the 24th Infantry Division destroyed the Iraqi formations and captured the two airfields the next day. The 24th then moved east with VII Corps and engaged several Iraqi Republican Guard divisions. The 24th Infantry Division's Task Force Tusker attacked entrenched Iraqi forces on 26 February 1991 to seize battle position 143, effectively severing the Iraqi Euphrates River Valley line of communication to the Kuwait Theater of operation and destroying the major combat elements of the Iraqi Republican Guard Forces Command's elite 26th Commando Brigade.

== Battle of Rumaila ==
Iraqi Republican Guard forces were engaged within the Hammar Marshes of the Tigris–Euphrates river system in Iraq while attempting to reach and cross the Lake Hammar causeway and escape northward toward Baghdad on Highway 8. Most of the five-mile (8.0 km)-long Iraqi caravan of several hundred vehicles was first boxed into a kill zone and then in the course of the next five hours systematically devastated by the U.S. 24th Infantry Division, including its armored forces, by AH-64 Apache attack helicopters, and nine artillery battalions. Nine American artillery battalions would fire thousands of rounds and rockets during this particular engagement. At least six Hammurabi Republican Guard battalions were destroyed.

The 1st Battalion, 24th Aviation Regiment destroyed 32 Iraqi tanks, 49 BMPs, 37 trucks, 8 Frog missile launchers, numerous other assorted artillery pieces, anti-aircraft guns, and support vehicles. This devastating aerial attack assured the destruction of the Republican Guard Forces Hammurabi Division and the remnants of several other infantry divisions. Four companies within 1st Battalion, 24th Aviation Regiment would be awarded Valorous Unit Award citations.

General Barry McCaffrey reported the elimination of 247 tanks and armored fighting vehicles, 43 artillery pieces, and over 400 trucks. Approximately 3,000 Iraqi soldiers were captured. The battle was one-sided and Iraqi attempts to return fire proved to be almost completely ineffective, as during the engagement only one U.S. soldier was injured and two U.S. armored vehicles were lost (an M2 Bradley infantry fighting vehicle damaged by enemy fire and an M1 Abrams tank set on fire by a nearby explosion of an Iraqi truck). A hospital bus with medics and wounded Iraqi soldiers who had already surrendered to another American platoon was also destroyed by gunfire, which later troubled many U.S. soldiers. Surviving Iraqi soldiers were either taken prisoner, fled on foot or swam to safety.

== Controversy ==
The all-out attack on the Iraqi column, sparked by Iraqis opening fire on a U.S. patrol which had wandered into their path of retreat, took place two days after the war had been officially halted by a unilateral U.S. ceasefire and just as the Iraqi government and Coalition forces were scheduled to begin formal peace talks the next morning. These circumstances provoked a heated debate over whether McCaffrey was justified in his decision to destroy the column, and over the reason the 24th Division moved during the ceasefire into the path of the withdrawing Iraqis in the first place. U.S. Lt. Gen. Ronald H. Griffith said to investigative journalist Seymour Hersh, "It was just a bunch of tanks in a train, transported by trailer truck, and Barry McCaffrey made it a battle. He made it a battle when it was never one." McCaffrey was ultimately exonerated by an Army inquiry, however, and another one by the U.S. Congress also did not find any fault in the incident.

== Summary ==
By the end of combat operations, the 24th Infantry Division advanced 260 miles and destroyed 360 tanks and other armored personnel carriers, 300 artillery pieces, 1,200 trucks, 25 aircraft, 19 missiles, and over 500 pieces of engineer equipment. The division took over 5,000 Iraqi prisoners of war while suffering only eight killed, 36 wounded, and five non-combat casualties. The 24th Infantry Division's Task Force Tusker would be awarded a Valorous Unit Award for its efforts.

== See also ==
- Highway of Death
