= Aratta =

Land that appears in Sumerian myths

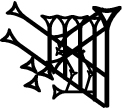
"ARATTA" in Sumerian script

Aratta is a land that appears in the Sumerian myths related to Enmerkar and Lugalbanda, the two early and possibly mythical kings of Uruk who are also mentioned in the Sumerian king list.

== Description in Sumerian literature ==
Aratta is described as follows in Sumerian literature:

- It is a fabulously wealthy place full of gold, silver, lapis lazuli and other precious materials, as well as the artisans to craft them.
- It is remote and difficult to reach.
- It is home to the goddess Inana, who transfers her allegiance from Aratta to Uruk.
- It is conquered by Enmerkar of Uruk.

== Mentions in Sumerian literature ==
Enmerkar and the Lord of Aratta — The goddess Inanna resides in Aratta, but Enmerkar of Uruk pleases her more than does the lord of Aratta, who is not named in this epic. Enmerkar wants Aratta to submit to Uruk, bring stones down from the mountain, craft gold, silver and lapis lazuli, and send them, along with "kugmea" ore to Uruk to build a temple. Inana bids him send a messenger to Aratta, who ascends and descends the "Zubi" mountains, and crosses Susa, Anshan, and "five, six, seven" mountains before approaching Aratta. Aratta in turn wants grain in exchange. However Inana transfers her allegiance to Uruk, and the grain gains the favor of Aratta's people for Uruk, so the lord of Aratta challenges Enmerkar to send a champion to fight his champion. Then the god Ishkur makes Aratta's crops grow.

Enmerkar and En-suhgir-ana — The lord of Aratta, who is here named En-suhgir-ana (or Ensuhkeshdanna), challenges Enmerkar of Uruk to submit to him over the affections of Inanna, but he is rebuffed by Enmerkar. A sorcerer from the recently defeated Hamazi then arrives in Aratta, and offers to make Uruk submit. The sorcerer travels to Eresh where he bewitches Enmerkar's livestock, but a wise woman outperforms his magic and casts him into the Euphrates; En-suhgir-ana then admits the loss of Inanna, and submits his kingdom to Uruk.

Lugalbanda in the Mountain Cave — is a tale of Lugalbanda, who will become Enmerkar's successor. Enmerkar's army travels through mountainous territory to wage war against rebellious Aratta. Lugalbanda falls ill and is left in a cave, but he prays to the various gods, recovers, and must find his way out of the mountains.

Lugalbanda and the Anzud Bird — Lugalbanda befriends the Anzud bird, and asks it to help him find his army again. When Enmerkar's army is faced with a setback, Lugalbanda volunteers to return to Uruk to ask the goddess Inana's aid. He crosses through the mountains, into the flat land, from the edge to the top of Anshan and then to Uruk, where Inana helps him. She advises Enmerkar to carry off Aratta's "worked metal and metalsmiths and worked stone and stonemasons" and all the "moulds of Aratta will be his". Then the city is described as having battlements made of green lapis lazuli and bricks made of "tinstone dug out in the mountains where the cypress grows".

=== Other mentions in Sumerian literature ===
- Praise Poem of Shulgi (Shulgi Y): "I filled it with treasures like those of holy Aratta."
- Shulgi and Ninlil's barge: "Aratta, full-laden with treasures"
- Proverbs: "When the authorities are wise, and the poor are loyal, it is the effect of the blessing of Aratta."
- Unprovenanced Proverbs: "When the authorities are wise, and the poor are passed by, it is the effect of the blessing of Aratta."
- Hymn to Hendursanga (Hendursanga A): "So that Aratta will be overwhelmed (?), Lugalbanda stands by at your (Hendursanga's) behest."
- Hymn to Nisaba (Nisaba A): "In Aratta he (Enki?) has placed E-zagin (the lapis lazuli temple) at her (Nisaba's) disposal."
- The building of Ninngirsu's temple (Gudea cylinder): "pure like Kesh and Aratta"
- Tigi to Suen (Nanna I): "the shrine of my heart which I (Nanna) have founded in joy like Aratta"
- Inana and Ibeh: "the inaccessible mountain range Aratta"
- Gilgamesh and Huwawa (Version B): "they know the way even to Aratta"
- Temple Hymns: Aratta is "respected"
- The Kesh Temple Hymn: Aratta is"important"
- Lament for Ur: Aratta is "weighty (counsel)"

== Location hypotheses ==
Early 20th century scholars initially took Aratta to be an epithet of the Sumerian city Shuruppak related to its local name for the god Enlil; however that is no longer seen to be the case. Although Aratta is known only from myth, some Assyriologists and archaeologists have speculated on possible locations where Aratta could have been, using criteria from the myths:

1. Land travelers must pass through Susa and the mountainous Anshan region to reach it.
2. It is a source of, or has access to valuable gems and minerals, in particular lapis lazuli, that are crafted on site.
3. It is accessible to Uruk by watercourse, yet remote from Uruk.
4. It is close enough to march a 27th-century BC Sumerian army there.

In 1963, Samuel Noah Kramer thought that a "Mount Hurum" in a Lugalbanda myth (which he titled "Lugalbanda on Mount Hurrum" at the time) might have referred to the Hurrians, and hence speculated Aratta to be near Lake Urmia. However, "Mount Hurum", "hur-ru-um kur-ra-ka", in what is now called Lugalbanda in the Mountain Cave, is today read "mountain cave", and Kramer subsequently introduced the title "Lugalbanda, the Wandering Hero" for this story.

Other speculations referred to the early gem trade route, the "Great Khorasan Road" from the Himalayan Mountains to Mesopotamia, which ran through northern Iran.

Anshan, which had not yet been located then, was assumed to be in the central Zagros mountain range.

However, when Anshan was identified as Tall-i Malyan in 1973, it was found to be 600 km south-east of Uruk, far removed from any northerly routes or watercourses from Uruk, and posing the logistical improbability of getting a 27th-century BC Sumerian army through 550 km of Elamite territory to wage war with Aratta.

Nevertheless, there have been speculations referring to eastern Iran as well. Dr. Yousef Majidzadeh believes the Jiroft culture could be Aratta.

By 1973, archaeologists were noting that there was no archaeological record of Aratta's existence outside of myth, and in 1978 Hansman cautions against over-speculation.

Writers in other fields have continued to hypothesize potential Aratta locations. A "possible reflex" has been suggested in Sanskrit Āraṭṭa or Arāṭṭa mentioned in the Mahabharata and other texts. Alternatively, the name is compared with the toponym Ararat or Urartu.
