= Eresh =

Eresh can refer to:

- A city in ancient Sumer, Eresh
- Akkadian pronunciation of NIN (cuneiform), a Sumerian word which can denote a "queen" or a "priestess".
