= Hammar Lacus =

Lake on Titan

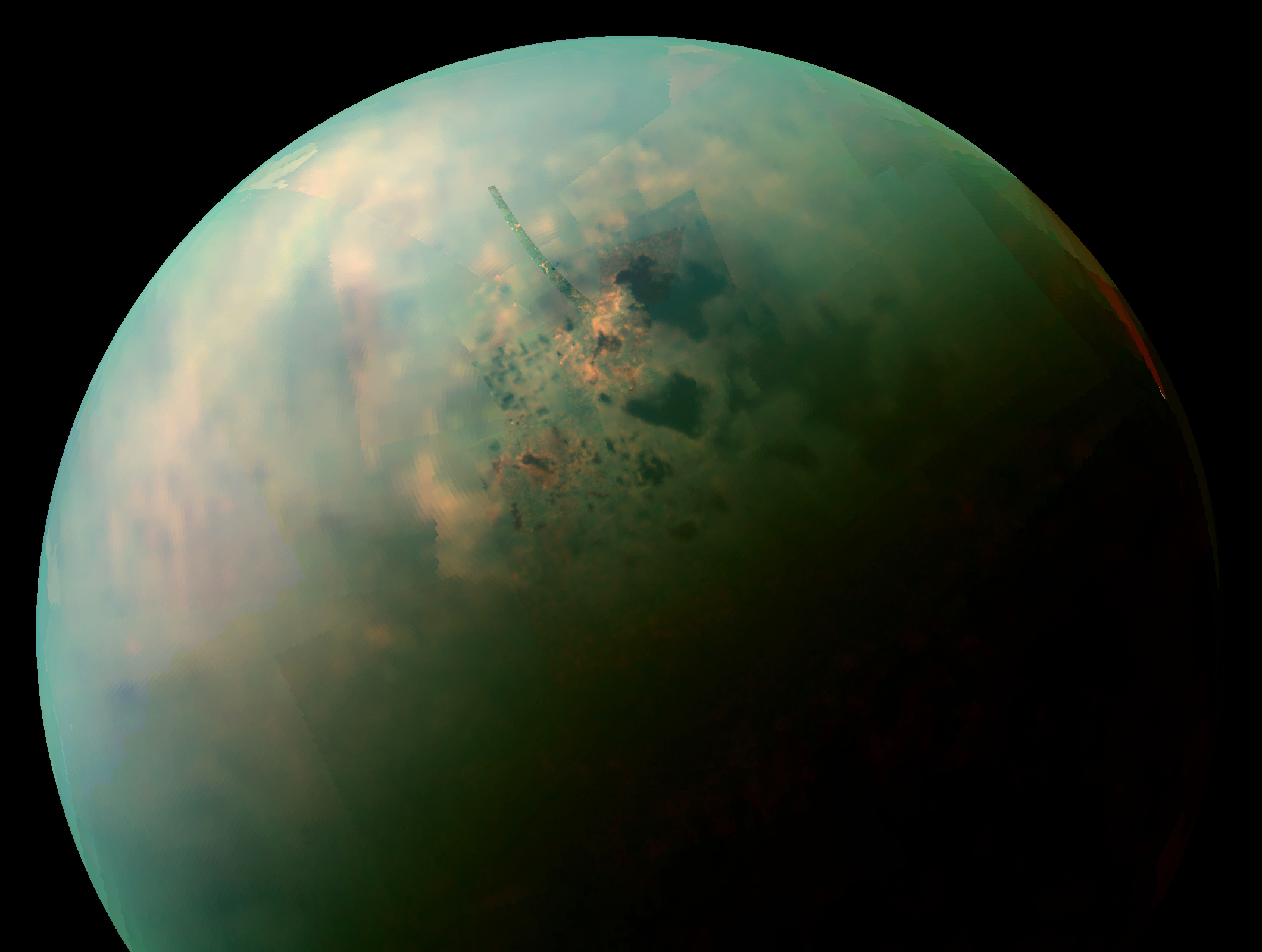
- False-color near infrared view of Titan's northern hemisphere, showing its seas and lakes.
- Feature type: Lacus
- Coordinates: 48.6°N 308.29°W
- Diameter: 200 km (Note: The USGS web site gives the size as a "diameter", but it is actually the length in the longest dimension.)
- Eponym: Hammar Lake

Hammar Lacus is one of a number of hydrocarbon seas and lakes found on Saturn's largest moon, Titan.

The lake is located at latitude 48.6°N and longitude 308.29° W on Titan's globe, and is composed of liquid methane and ethane, At 200 km in diameter it is the third largest lake on Titan and is named after Hammar Lake in southern Iraq, its name being adopted by the IAU on 3 December 2013. Its area is given as 18600 km^{2}.
