= Dasman Palace =

Royal Palace in Dasman, Kuwait

Dasman Palace is a historic palace in Dasman, Kuwait City, Kuwait. It was the site of the Battle of Dasman Palace between Iraqi and Kuwaiti forces in 1990. In 2025, it was designated as a protected "archeological and historical site" by the Municipal Council of Kuwait City, joining Kuwait's National Register of Historic Buildings.
