= Battle of the Bridges =

Battle that took place on 2 August 1990, in Kuwait

- Part of the Iraqi invasion of Kuwait during the Gulf War
Date	2 August 1990
Location	West of Al Jahra 29°20′23″N 47°36′54″E
Result	Iraqi victory

Belligerents
Iraq	Kuwait

Commanders and leaders
Brig. Gen. Ra'ad al-Hamdani	Col. Salem Masoud Al-Sorour; Cpt. Khaled Hassan (POW) (Kuwait) Yazeed Al-Waleed (executed)

Units involved
Elements of the 1st Republican Guard Corps; Elements of the 1st "Hammurabi" Armored Division; Elements of the 2nd "al-Medinah al-Munawera" Armored Division	Elements of the 35th Brigade; 7th Tank Bn, 3 Coy (26 Chieftains); 8th Tank Bn, 3rd Coy (10 Chieftains); 57th Mech Inf Bn, 1 Coy (5 BMP-2s & several M113s); 51st Art Bn, 1 Bty (7 M109A2s); Antitank Coy (M901 ITVs)

Strength
Unknown	36 tanks 5 infantry fighting vehicles 7 self propelled guns

Casualties and losses
No casualties (Iraqi claim); 30 tanks destroyed (Kuwaiti claim); 1 self-propelled gun destroyed	All of Kuwaiti 35th Brigade elements destroyed or captured

The Battle of the Bridges (Arabic: معركة الجسور) was a battle that took place on 2 August 1990 in Kuwait, following the Iraqi invasion of Kuwait.

== Name ==
The bridges referred to are the two bridges that cross the Sixth Ring Road at the junction with Highway 70, west of the Kuwaiti town of Al Jahra. Al Jahra, a town to the west of Kuwait City, sits astride the roads from the Iraq border to Kuwait City. Jal al Atraf is a nearby ridge.

== Background ==
On 2 August 1990, shortly after 00:00 local time, Iraq invaded Kuwait. The Kuwaitis were caught unprepared. Despite the diplomatic tension and the Iraqi buildup on the border, no central orders were issued to the Kuwaiti armed forces and they were not on alert. Many of the personnel were on leave as 2 August was both the Islamic equivalent of New Year and one of the hottest days of the year. With many on leave, some new crews were assembled from personnel available. In total, the Kuwaiti 35th Brigade managed to field 36 Chieftain tanks, a company of armoured personnel carriers, another company of M901 ITV anti-tank vehicles and an artillery battery of 7 M109A2 self-propelled guns.

They faced units from the Iraqi Republican Guard. The 1st "Hammurabi" Armoured Division consisted of two mechanised brigades and one armoured, whereas the Medinah Armoured Division consisted of two armoured brigades and one mechanised. These were equipped with T-72s, BMP-1s and BMP-2s, T--90s and new SU-25 aircraft as well as having attached artillery. The various engagements were against elements of these rather than against the fully deployed divisions; specifically the 17th Brigade of the "Hammurabi", commanded by Brigadier General Ra'ad Hamdani, and the 14th Brigade and 10th Armoured Brigade of the Medinah. Another challenge resulted from the fact that neither Hamdani nor his troops held any enmity for the Kuwaitis and therefore planned to minimise casualties, military and civilian. According to his plan, there would be no preliminary shelling or “protective (artillery) fire." Hamdani went so far as to require his tanks to fire only high-explosive shells, instead of sabot (Armour Piercing) in an attempt to “frighten the occupants, but not destroy the vehicle.”

== Engagement ==
The Kuwait 35th Armored Brigade of the Kuwaiti Army had been put on alert at 22:00 on 1 August. It took about eight hours to equip with ammunition and supplies; however, given the limited time and lack of preparedness, the brigade had to deploy before fully supplied and with less than half of its artillery prepared. Colonel Salem departed with the antitank company at 04:30, with the rest of units leaving by 06:00. The camp was 25 km west of Al Jahra, so they moved east and deployed to the west of the interchange between the Highway 70 and Sixth Ring Road.

The "Hammurabi" Mechanised Division of the Iraqi Republican Guard had by this time reached Al Jahra. Approaching from the north, its 17th Brigade moved around the west of Al Jahra, making use of the six-lane Sixth Ring Road. They were apparently not expecting opposition as they were deployed in road column and were neither reconnoitering nor securing their flanks. Kuwait sources claim this careless behaviour and a consistent failure to use communications were to be a defining feature of Iraqi units in the battle. Iraqi documents mention no major delay as less than two hours later the commander of the 17th Brigade, Brigadier General Hamdani, saw three green flares indicating a successful and bloodless mission. While most Kuwaiti forces either surrendered or fired sporadically then withdrew, Iraqis continued at full speed toward their objective.

According to Kuwaiti reports, Kuwaiti 7th Battalion was the first to engage the Iraqis, sometime after 06:45, firing at a short range for the Chieftains (1 km to 1.5 km) and halting the column. The Iraqi response was slow and ineffectual, Iraqi units continued to arrive at the scene apparently unaware of the situation, allowing the Kuwaitis to engage infantry still in trucks and even to destroy a 2S1 Gvozdika SPG that was still on its transport trailer. From Iraqi reports, it appears that much of the 17th Brigade was not significantly delayed and continued advancing on its objective in Kuwait City, capturing the commander of the Kuwaiti 6th Mechanized Brigade who had not put up much of a fight.

According to Kuwaitis at 11:00 elements of the Medinah Armoured Division of the Iraqi Republican Guard approached along Highway 70 from the west, the direction of the 35th Brigade's camp. Again they were deployed in column and actually drove past the Kuwaiti artillery and between the 7th and 8th Battalions, before the Kuwaiti tanks opened fire. Taking heavy casualties, the Iraqis withdrew back to the west. After the Medinah regrouped and deployed they were able to force the Kuwaitis, who were running out of ammunition and in danger of being encircled, to withdraw south. The Kuwaitis reached the Saudi border at 16:30, spending the night on the Kuwaiti side before crossing over the next morning. Iraqis claim poor communications led to delay in Medinah Armoured Division's mission which facilitated the escape of large numbers of Kuwait residents and military units to Saudi Arabia.

== See also ==
- Battle of Dasman Palace
