= Uhub =

Uhub 𒌑𒄸
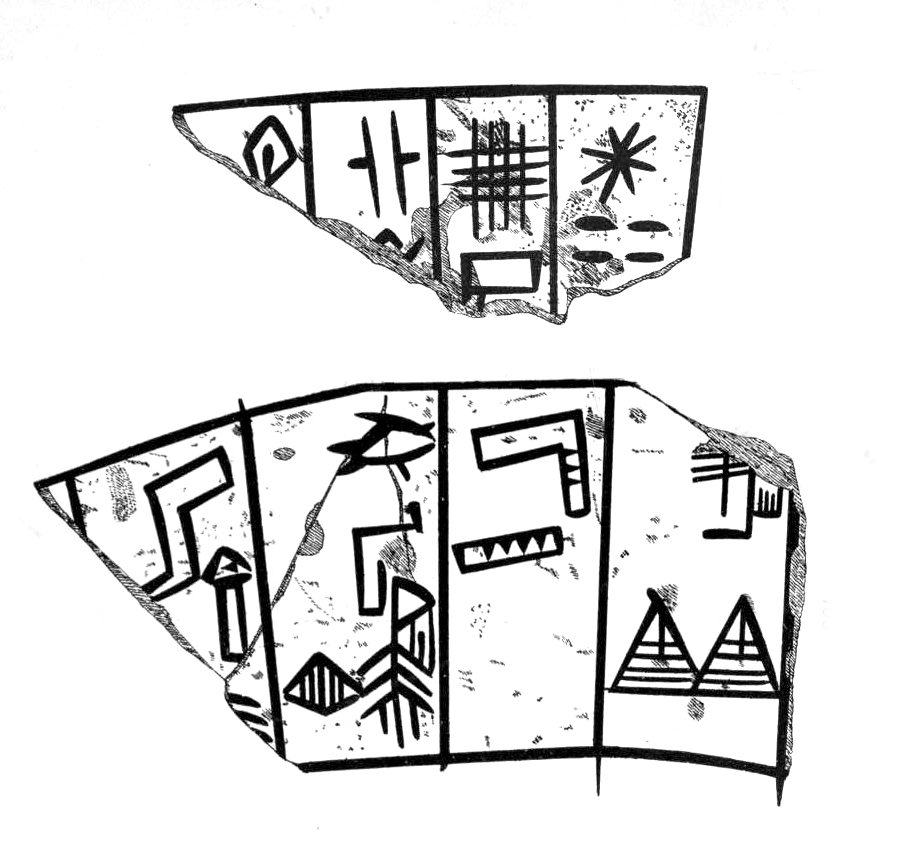
- Vase fragments of Uhub. The top one has the fragmentary inscription Zababa Uhub Ensi Kish-ki ("God Zababa, Uhub Governor of Kish", in the British Museum (BM 129401). The second fragment, from a different vase, mentions "Pussusu conqueror of Hamazi ( 𒄩𒈠𒍣𒆠, ha-ma-zi{ki})".

King of Kish
- Reign: c. 2570 BC
- Successor: Possibly Mesilim

Location of Kish

Uhub (Sumerian: 𒌑𒄸, u2-hub2), (fl. c. 2570 BC), was Ensi (Governor) of the Sumerian city-state of Kish before Mesilim.

His name is missing from the Sumerian king list, just as the name of Mesilim, who ruled around 50 years later. Uhub is mentioned on a vase dedicated to the god Zababa. The first inscription has been reconstructed as 𒀭𒍝𒈠𒈠 / 𒌑𒄸 / 𒑐𒋼𒋛 / 𒆧𒆠, Zamama, Uhub ensi kish-ki "Zababa, Uhub, Governor of Kish".

Uhub is otherwise known from a few more inscriptions.

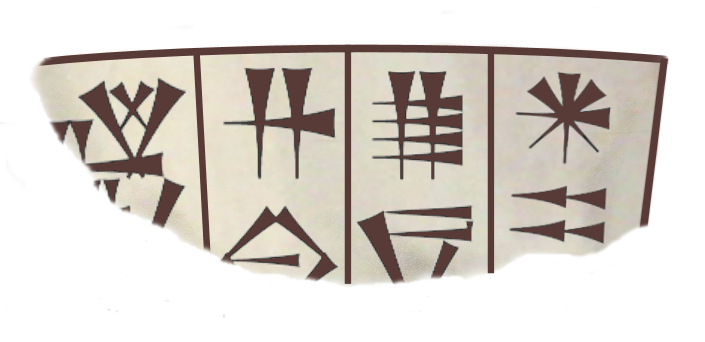
Transcription in standard Sumero-Akkadian cuneiform of the fragmentary inscription 𒀭𒍝𒈠𒈠 / 𒌑𒄸 / 𒑐𒋼𒋛 / 𒆧𒆠, Zamama, Uhub ensi kish-ki "Zababa, Uhub, Governor of Kish", British Museum (BM 129401). The second fragment from the same vase mentions "Pussusu conqueror of Hamazi".

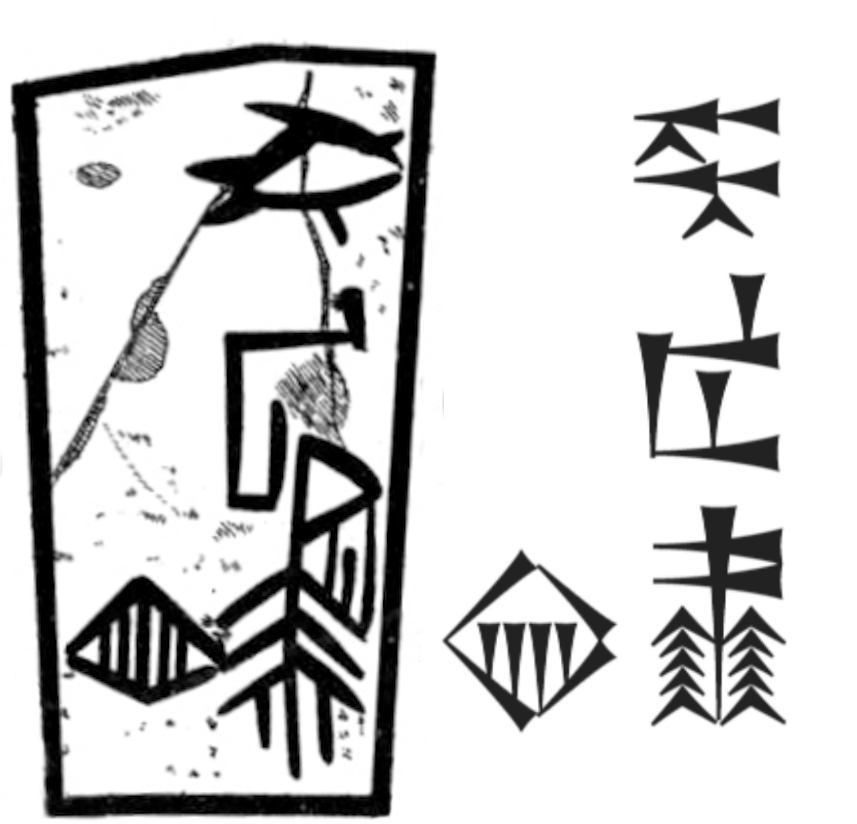
"Hamazi" in the second inscription

== See also ==
- History of Sumer

== Bibliography ==
- Vojtech Zamarovský, Na počiatku bol Sumer, Mladé letá, 1968 Bratislava
- Plamen Rusev, Mesalim, Lugal Na Kish: Politicheska Istoriia Na Ranen Shumer (XXVIII-XXVI V. Pr. N. E.), Faber, 2001 (LanguageBulgarian) [(Mesalim, Lugal of Kish. Political History of Early Sumer (XXVIII–XXVI century BC.)]
