= 1st Hammurabi Armoured Division =

Hammurabi Armoured Republican Guard Division
- Hammurabi Division brigade tactical markings. The brigade numbers were often, but not always, written inside the triangle. The color of the bottom stripe changed according to tank regiment or mechanized battalion.
- Active: May 1986 – 2003
- Country: Iraq
- Allegiance: Ba'athist Iraq
- Branch: Iraqi Republican Guard
- Type: Armoured Division
- Role: Shock troops
- Size: ≈10,000 (1991)
- Engagements: Iran–Iraq War; Second Battle of al-Faw; Tawakalna ala Allah Operations; Persian Gulf War; Invasion of Kuwait; Battle of Dasman Palace; Battle of the Bridges; Highway of Death; Battle of Rumaila; 1991 uprisings in Iraq; Siege of Karbala; 2003 Invasion of Iraq

Commanders
- Last Commander: Najim Abdallah Zahwen Al Ujayli
- Notable commanders: Ra'ad al-Hamdani

The 'Hammurabi' Armored Division (Arabic: فرقة حمورابي المدرعة) was an elite formation of the Iraqi Republican Guard. It was named after Hammurabi; a Babylonian King known for the set of laws called Hammurabi's Code, which constitute one of the earliest surviving codes of law in recorded history.

The division was decisively defeated by the United States Armed Forces in 1991, when it was forced out of Kuwait after suffering heavy casualties, and again in 2003, when the United States invaded Iraq. The latter resulted in the total collapse of the division as its senior officers abandoned their posts, and it was never reformed as the Republican Guard itself was disbanded following the fall of Saddam Hussein's government.

== History ==
In 1990 the division included the 17th Armoured Brigade under Brigadier General Ra’ad Hamdani and the division commander was Major General Qais Abd al-Razaq, a "very practical man."

The division played a central role in the invasion of Kuwait which took place in August 1990. On the morning of August 2, 1990, near the Mutla Pass, a battle took place between the Vickers MBT of the 6th Mechanized Brigade, Kuwait Army, and the T-72s of the division's 17th Armoured Brigade. Kuwaiti tanks were able to knock out one T-72 during the ambush, but were defeated, and the commander of the 6th Brigade captured. Only 20 surviving Vickers tanks were able to retreat to Saudi Arabia.

A Hammurabi Division command after-action report recorded that the division suffered 99 killed, 249 wounded, and 15 missing during the invasion of Kuwait.

=== 1991 Gulf War ===
The division commander has stated that he ordered his tanks to use high-explosive anti-personnel munitions, rather than anti tank rounds, so as to minimize Kuwaiti casualties in tank engagements of the invasion.

Towards the end of the war the division was involved in the controversial Battle of Rumaila, when US Army forces under Lt. Gen. Barry McCaffrey nearly annihilated the retreating division near the Rumaila oil field, resulting in the division suffering some 7,000 casualties.

There are differing reports about the composition of the division in the late 1990s. But both Cordesman, "Key Targets in Iraq," February 1998, and Sean Boyle, in Jane's Intelligence Review, September 1997, list the 8th, 14th and 17th Brigades. Cordesman writes that the 8th and 14th were mechanised while the 17th was an armoured brigade.

=== 2003 invasion of Iraq ===
During the Invasion of Iraq the division was given orders to retreat from Suwayrah on the night of 5 April 2003 after several days of bombardment by American planes. Further orders on exactly where to regroup were not forthcoming, and senior officers disappeared, leading to mass desertions and the collapse of the division.
