= Hamazi =

Ancient kingdom or city-state

Approximate location of Hamazi.

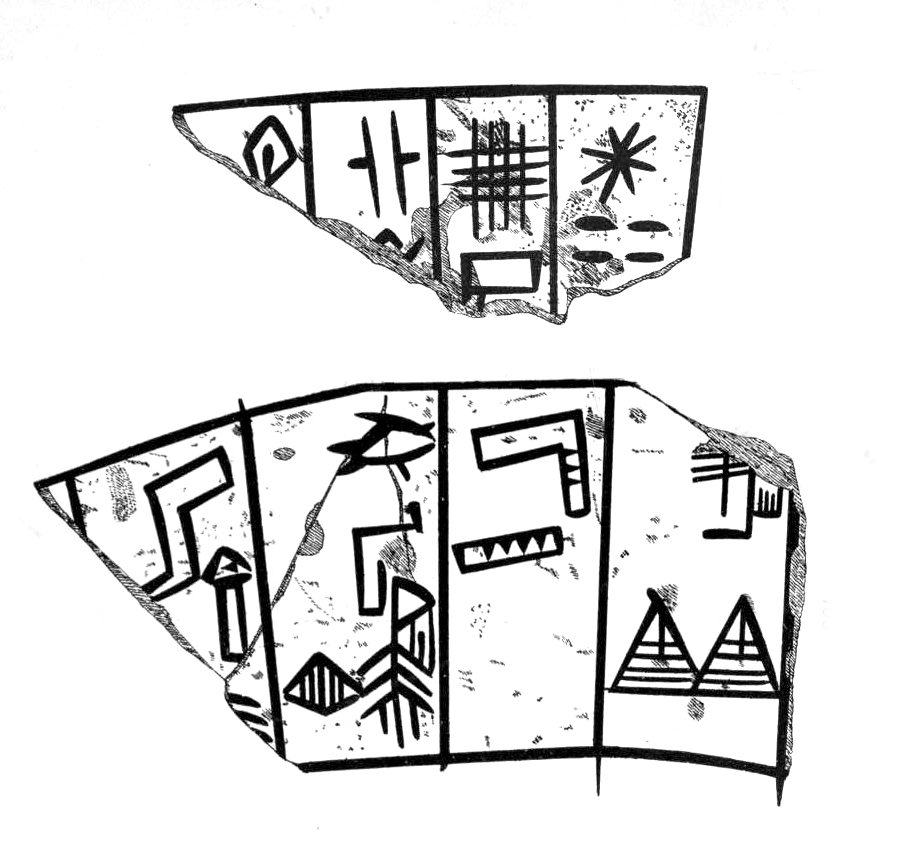
Vase fragments of Uhub. The top one has the fragmentary inscription Zababa Uhub Ensi Kish-ki ("God Zababa, Uhub Governor of Kish"). The second fragment from a different vase mentions "Pussusu conqueror of Hamazi ( 𒄩𒈠𒍣𒆠, ha-ma-zi^{ki})". British Museum (BM 129401)

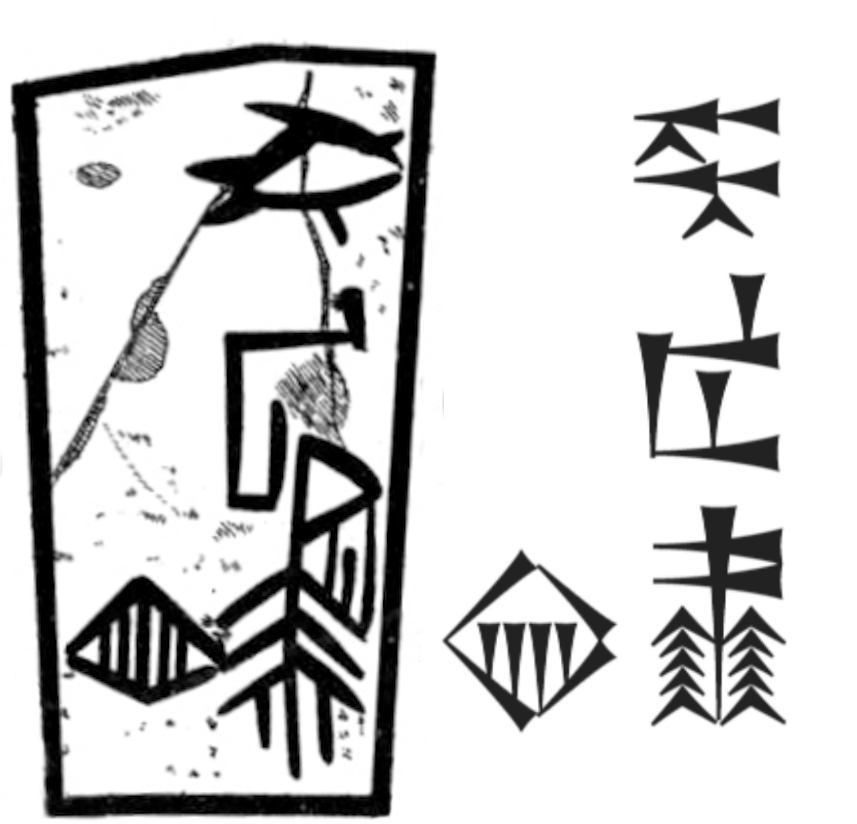
"Hamazi" in the inscription of Uhub.

Hamazi or Khamazi (Sumerian: 𒄩𒈠𒍣𒆠, ha-ma-zi^{ki}, or 𒄩𒈠𒍢𒆠 Ḫa-ma-zi_{2}^{ki}) was an ancient kingdom or city-state which became prominent during the Early Dynastic period. Its exact location is unknown.

== History ==
=== Early Bronze Age ===
In the early days of archaeology two pottery fragments were found in Nippur which it was assumed were part of the same vessel (CBS 9571+CBS 9577). One referred to a Uhub/Utug ruler of Kish and the other to an unknown ruler defeating Hamazi. Subsequent analysis showed that the two fragments did not in fact belong to the same vessel. The relevant fragment (BM 129402) reads "[To the deity DN P]ussussu, vanquisher of Hamazi, dedi[cated] (this vessel).".

One of the earliest references to Hamazi is found in the epic literary composition Enmerkar and the Lord of Aratta, where Enmerkar prays to Enki about the confusion of languages in the various inhabited lands, at the time of the building of the ziggurats in Eridu and Uruk. Hamazi is the only land mentioned in this prayer with the epithet "many-tongued". A sequel, Enmerkar and En-suhgir-ana also mentions that the sorcerer of Hamazi, Urgirinuna, went to Aratta after Hamazi "had been destroyed"; he is later sent by the Lord of Aratta on a failed mission attempting to bring Enmerkar into submission.

==== Early Dynastic period ====
According to the semi-literary Sumerian King List, king Hadanish of Hamazi held hegemony over Sumer after defeating Kish, but was in turn defeated by Enshakushanna of Uruk.

An uncertain attestation is a clay tablet found in the archives at Ebla in Syria bears a copy of a diplomatic message sent from king Irkab-Damu of Ebla to king Zizi of Hamazi, along with a large quantity of wood, hailing him as a brother, and requesting him to send mercenaries in exchange. A tablet from a few years later states " ... 470 g. of silver of the king of A. which the king of Hamazi has handed over and is his giving (as) a gift to PN, the representative-messenger, (for) the king of Ebla". A later analysis of the toponyms in the tablets in question indicate that the Hamazi mentioned in the Ebla tablets is actually a different Hamazi, at modern Qalah Hom, the “citadel hill” of modern Homs.

==== Akkadian period ====
In the Akkadian period, little is known about Hamazi which probably was a province/governorate of the Akkadian Empire (c. 2334-2154 BCE).

==== Ur III period ====
In the Ur III period, Hamazi was a province/governorate during the reign of Amar-Sin. Two governors, called ensi, during this reign named Lu-nanna son of Namhani, and Ur-Ishkur are recorded in tablets from Drehem. The first, Lu-nanna, was recorded in Amar-Sin year 1 and then in year 2: "when His Majesty drank beer in the house of Lu-Nanna, son of Namhani, the ruler of Hamazi.". By the 5th year of Amar-Sin Ur-Ishkur is mentioned as governor of Hamazi. In year nine his daughter-in-law is mentioned "when Ur-Iskur, ruler of Hamazi, 'brought/fetched' his daughter-in-law". We learn her name in an inscription from AS7 "when Tabur-hattum, the daughter-in-law of the ruler Ur-Iskur, when she went (back) to Hamazi". A further possible ensi, under Su-Sin, was Arad-Nanna, though that is thinly attested.

According to a letter from Puzur-Numušda, governor of Kazallu, in the last days of the Ur III empire wrote to Ibbi-Sin, last ruler of that empire and claimed that the land of Hamazi was plundered by Ishbi-Erra of Isin. He also claimed that the god Enlil had promised Isbi-Erra dominion "from the land of Hamazi (down) to the Sea of Magan".

== Location ==
Hamazi is thought to have been located in Zagros Mountain region somewhere between the Upper Zab and Diyala Rivers. The mention of a "Šu-Eštar of Hamazi" and another person named Ititi from there in Old Akkadian documents found at Nuzi sparked suggestions that Hamazi was nearby. One researcher proposed that Hamazi was the later Old Babylonian period city of Ekallatum. Two researchers have proposed that "Hamazi is located at the site of Kani Jowez about 10 kms SE of modern Halabjah".

== List of rulers ==
The Sumerian King List (SKL) lists only one ruler for Hamazi. The following list should not be considered complete:

Portrait or inscription	Ruler	Approx. date and length of reign (Middle Chronology)	Comments, notes, and references for mentions
Early Dynastic period (c. 2900 – c. 2350 BC)
Hamazi dynasty of Sumer (c. 2530 – c. 2010 BC)
"Then Kish was defeated and the kingship was taken to Hamazi." — Sumerian King List (SKL)
	Hadanish 𒄩𒁕𒉌𒅖	Uncertain, fl. c. 2530, c. 2430 BC (7, 360, or 420 years)	Historicity uncertain; Known from the SKL; very little otherwise; Said on the Sumerian King List (SKL) to have held the title of, "King" of not just Hamazi; but, to have held the "Kingship" over all of Sumer
" 1 king; he ruled for 360 years. Then Hamazi was defeated and the kingship was returned a second time to Uruk." — SKL
Akkadian period (c. 2350 – c. 2154 BC)
	Zizi 𒍣𒍣	Uncertain, fl. c. 2450, c. 2430, c. 2320 BC	Historicity certain; temp. of Irkab-Damu
Gutian period (c. 2154 – c. 2119 BC)
	Ur-Adad	Uncertain, fl. c. 2154 – c. 2046 BC	Historicity certain
Ur III period (c. 2119 – c. 2004 BC)
	Lu-nanna 𒇽𒀭𒋀𒆠	Uncertain, reigned c. 2046 – c. 2041 BC	Son of Nam-mahani; temp. of Amar-Sin; Held the title of, "Governor"
	Ur-Ishkur 𒌨𒀭𒅎	Uncertain, r. c. 2041 – c. 2037 BC	Historicity certain; temp. of Amar-Sin; Held the title of, "Governor"
	Arad-Nanna 𒀴𒀭𒋀𒆠	Uncertain, fl. c. c. 2037, c. 2030, c. 2010 BC	Historicity certain; temp. of Shu-Sin; Held the title of, "Governor"

== See also ==
- List of cities of the ancient Near East
