= Najim Abdallah Zahwen Al Ujayli =

Iraqi general

Najim Abdallah Zahwen Al Ujayli was an Iraqi general who served in the Hammurabi Armoured Division of the Republican Guard under Saddam Hussein.

In September 2009 he was arrested by elements of the Iraqi Special Operations Forces for allegedly commanding terrorist cells operating in and around Tikrit.
