= Lugalbanda and the Anzud Bird =

Story in Sumerian mythology

Lugalbanda and the Anzu Bird (or Lugalbanda II, The Return of Lugalbanda) is a Sumerian mythological account. The story is the second part of the narrative about the hero Lugalbanda. The first story is known as Lugalbanda in the Mountain Cave, or sometimes Lugalbanda in the Wilderness. They are part of a four-story cycle that describes the conflicts between Enmerkar, king of Unug (Uruk), and the king of Aratta. The texts are believed to be composed during the Ur III Period (21st century BCE), but almost all of the extant copies come from Isin-Larsa period (20th-18th centuries BCE). Nevertheless, a few fragmentary bilingual copies (Sumerian and Akkadian) from Nineveh suggest that the texts were still known during the first millennium.

== Synopsis ==
This story starts with Lugalbanda alone in the highlands of Lullubi. He finds the chick of the giant Anzû (or Anzud) bird, which is described as a lion-headed eagle, and decides to feed the chick. When the Anzu bird returns, it is first startled by the chick not responding to its call, but once it finds out what happened, it is very pleased with Lugalbanda and in appreciation grants him the power to travel at unbelievable speed.

With his newly gained abilities, Lugalbanda catches up with his comrades who are laying siege to the city of Aratta. But his king, Enmerkar, is facing problems with the siege, and after a year of setbacks without success, decides to seek the advice of the goddess Inanna, who is back in Uruk (in the story referred to as Unug or Kulaba), pleading for her to assist him once more, as she had assisted in building a wall against the encroaching Martu in the fiftieth year of his reign.

Finally, Lugalbanda volunteers for the trip. Lugalbanda is able to travel the incredible distance over seven mountain ranges within a day's time. Inanna responds with a parable instructing Enmerkar how to wrest control of Aratta and its resources.
