= Battle of Dasman Palace =

1990 Iraqi victory in the Gulf War

- Part of the Gulf War
Date	2 August 1990
Location	Dasman Palace, Kuwait City 29°23′12.96″N 47°59′50.57″E
Result	Iraqi victory

Belligerents
Iraq	Kuwait

Commanders and leaders
(Ba'athist Iraq) Brig. Gen. Ra'ad al-Hamdani	(Kuwait) Fahad Al-Ahmed Al-Jaber Al-Sabah †

Units involved
Republican Guard; Elements of the 1st "Hammurabi" Mechanised Division; Elements of the 8th "As Saiqa" Special Forces Division	Kuwait National Guard; Kuwait Army

The Battle of Dasman Palace (Arabic: معركة قصر دسمان maʿraka Qaṣr Dasmān), also called the Battle of Dasman, took place between the Kuwaiti and Iraqi forces during the Iraqi invasion of Kuwait on 2 August 1990.

== Battle ==
On 2 August 1990, shortly after 00:00 local time, Iraq invaded Kuwait. The attack on Dasman Palace, the residence of the Emir of Kuwait, by Iraqi special forces commenced sometime between 04:00 and 06:00; these forces have been variously reported as helicopter airborne troops, or as infiltrators in civilian clothes. The Iraqi forces were reinforced through the battle by the arrival of further troops, notably elements of the Republican Guard "Hammurabi" Division that had passed to the east of Al Jahra, using Highway 80 to attack into Kuwait City.

Fighting was fierce, especially around midday, but ended around 14:00 with the Iraqis taking control of the palace. They were thwarted in their aim of capturing the Emir and his advisors, who had relocated to General Headquarters before the assault began. Among the casualties was the Emir's younger brother, Fahd Al-Ahmad, who was killed as he arrived to defend the palace.

== See also ==
- Battle of the Bridges
