= Enmerkar and the Lord of Aratta =

Text in Sumerian epic mythology

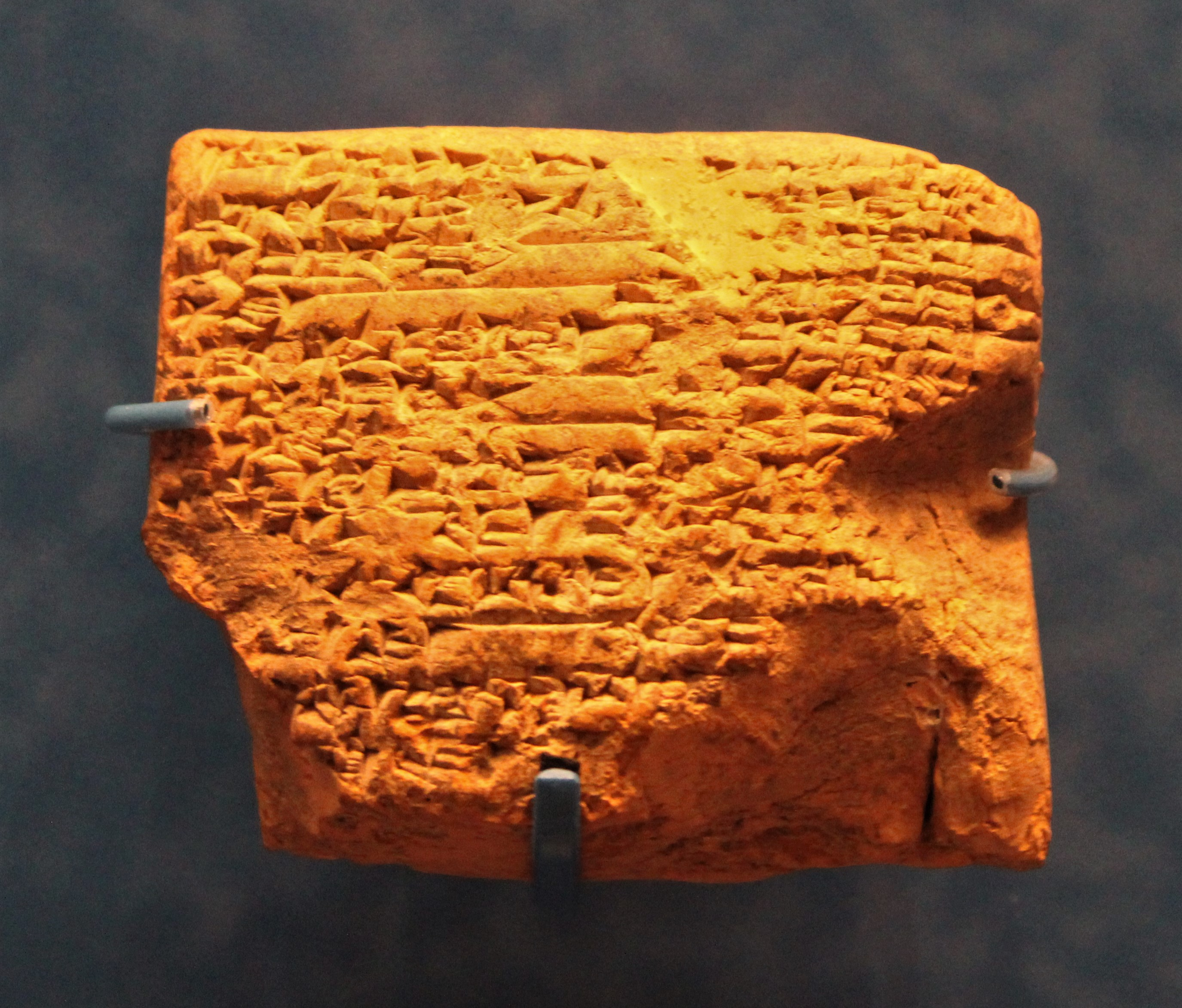
Fragment of a tablet with "Enmerkar and the Lord of Aratta", c. 1900–1600 BC

Enmerkar and the Lord of Aratta is a legendary Sumerian account, preserved in early post-Sumerian copies, composed in the Neo-Sumerian period (ca. 21st century BC). It is one of a series of accounts describing the conflicts between Enmerkar, king of Unug-Kulaba, and the unnamed king of Aratta.

Because it gives a Sumerian account of the "confusion of tongues", and also involves Enmerkar constructing temples at Eridu and Uruk, it has, since the time of Samuel Kramer, been compared with the Tower of Babel narrative in the Book of Genesis.

== Synopsis ==
Near the beginning of the account, the following background is provided: "In those days of yore, when the destinies were determined, the great princes allowed Unug Kulaba's E-ana to lift its head high. Plenty, and carp floods and the rain which brings forth dappled barley were then increased in Unug Kulaba. Before the land of Dilmun yet existed, the E-ana of Unug Kulaba was well founded."

E-ana was a temple in Uruk built in honour of the goddess Inanna, the "lady of all the lands" (E-ana is 'house of An', or 'Temple of An'). Similarly, the lord of Aratta has himself crowned in Inanna's name, but she does not find this as pleasing as her brick temple in Uruk.

Enmerkar, thus "chosen by Inanna in her holy heart from the bright mountain", then asks Inanna to let him subject Aratta and make the people of Aratta deliver a tribute of precious metals and gemstones, for constructing the lofty Abzu temple of Enki at Eridu, as well as for embellishing her own E-ana sanctuary at Uruk. Inanna accordingly advises Enmerkar to dispatch a herald across the mountains of Susin and Anshan to the lord of Aratta, to demand his submission and his tribute.

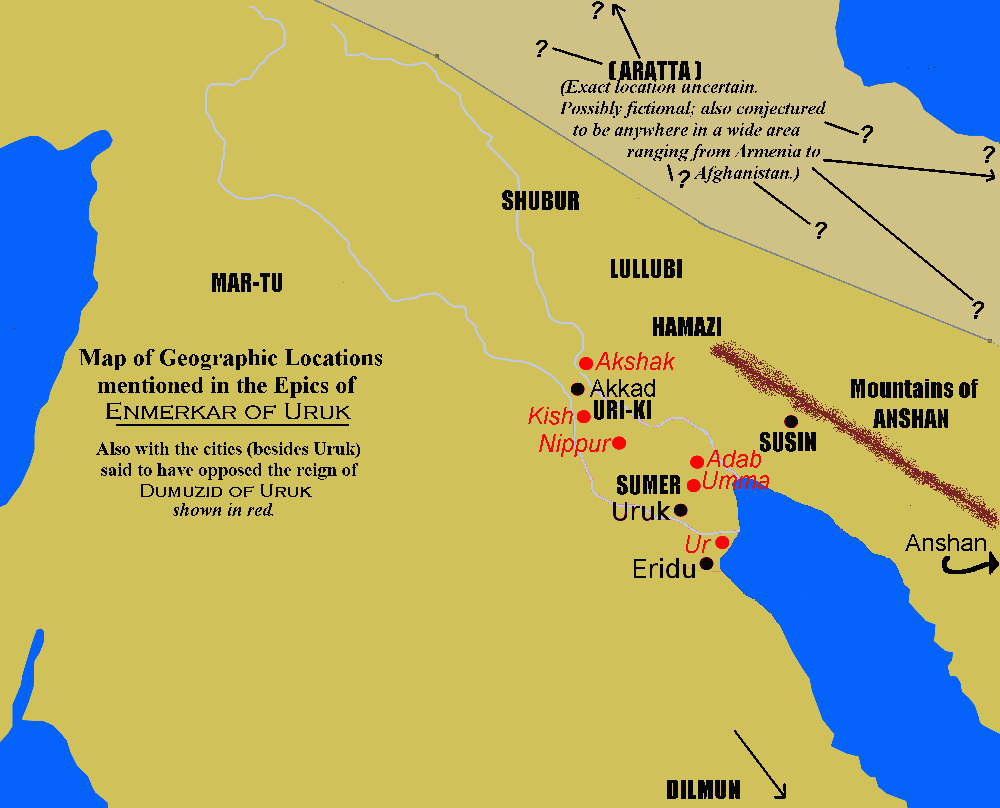
Places mentioned in the Enmerkar Epics

Enmerkar agrees and sends the envoy, along with his specific threats to destroy Aratta and disperse its people, if they do not send him the tribute – "lest like the devastation which swept destructively, and in whose wake Inanna arose, shrieked and yelled aloud, I too wreak a sweeping devastation there." He is furthermore to recite the "Incantation of Nudimmud", a hymn imploring Enki to restore (or in some translations, to disrupt) the linguistic unity of the inhabited regions, named as Shubur, Hamazi, Sumer, Uri-ki (the region around Akkad), and the Martu land:

On that day when there is no snake, when there is no scorpion, when there is no hyena, when there is no lion, when there is neither dog nor wolf, when there is thus neither fear nor trembling, man has no rival! At such a time, may the lands of Shubur and Hamazi, the many-tongued, and Sumer, the great mountain of the me of magnificence, and Akkad, the land possessing all that is befitting, and the Martu land, resting in security – the whole universe, the well-guarded people – may they all address Enlil together in a single language! For at that time, for the ambitious lords, for the ambitious princes, for the ambitious kings – Enki, the lord of abundance and of steadfast decisions, the wise and knowing lord of the Land, the expert of the gods, chosen for wisdom, the lord of Eridug, shall change the speech in their mouths, as many as he had placed there, and so the speech of mankind is truly one.

The messenger arrives in Aratta, reciting this message to the king, and asks him for a reply to take to his lord Enmerkar, whom he calls "the scion of him with the glistening beard, whom his stalwart cow gave birth to in the mountain of the shining me, who was reared on the soil of Aratta, who was given suck at the udder of the good cow, who is suited for office in Kulaba."

The king of Aratta replies that submission to Uruk is out of the question, because Inanna herself had chosen him to his office and power. But the herald then reveals that Inanna has been installed as queen at E-ana and has even promised Enmerkar to make Aratta bow to Uruk.

Devastated by this news, the lord of Aratta finally gives his response: he is more than prepared for a military contest with Uruk, whom he considers no match for his might; however he will submit, on the sole conditions that Enmerkar send him a vast amount of barley grain in nets, and that Inanna convince him that she has forsaken Aratta and confirm her allegiance to Uruk.

The herald returns to Enmerkar bearing this reply, and the next day Enmerkar actually sends the barley to Aratta, along with the herald and another demand to send even more precious stones.

The lord of Aratta, in a fit of pride, refuses and instead asks Enmerkar to deliver to him these precious stones himself. Upon hearing this, Enmerkar spends ten years preparing an ornate sceptre, then sends it to Aratta with his messenger. This frightens the lord of Aratta, who now sees that Inanna has indeed forsaken him, but he instead proposes to arrange a one-on-one combat between two champions of the two cities, to determine the outcome of the still-diplomatic conflict with Enmerkar. The king of Uruk responds by accepting this challenge, while increasing his demands for the people of Aratta to make a significant offering for the E-ana and the abzu, or face destruction and dispersal. To relieve the herald who, beleaguered, can no longer remember all the messages with which he is charged, Enmerkar then resorts to an invention: writing on tablets. The herald again traverses the "seven mountains" to Aratta, with the tablets, and when the king of Aratta tries to read the message, Ishkur, the storm-god, causes a great rain to produce wild wheat and chickpeas that are then brought to the king. Seeing this, the king declares that Inanna has not forsaken the primacy of Aratta after all, and summons his champion.

The remainder of the text has many lacunae- (line text losses), and the following events are unclear, but the tablet seems to end with Enmerkar triumphant, possibly installed by Inanna on the throne of Aratta, and with the people of Aratta delivering the tribute to E-ana, and providing the materials to build the Apsû.

A sequel text, Enmerkar and En-suhgir-ana, seems to continue the epic.

== See also ==
- Enmerkar and En-suhgir-ana
