= Lugalbanda in the Mountain Cave =

Story in Sumerian mythology

Lugalbanda in the Mountain Cave (or Lugalbanda I, Lugalbanda in the Wilderness) is a Sumerian mythological account. It is one of the four known stories that belong to the same cycle describing conflicts between Enmerkar, king of Unug (Uruk), and an unnamed king of Aratta. The story is followed by another known as Lugalbanda and the Anzu Bird, together forming the two parts of one story. The stories, from the composer’s point of view, take place in the distant past. The accounts are believed to be composed during the Ur III Period (21st century BCE), although almost all extant copies come from Isin-Larsa period (20th-18th centuries BCE). Tablets containing these stories were found in various locations of southern Iraq, primarily in the city of Nippur, and were part of the curriculum of Sumerian scribal schools during the Old Babylonian period (20th-17th centuries BCE).

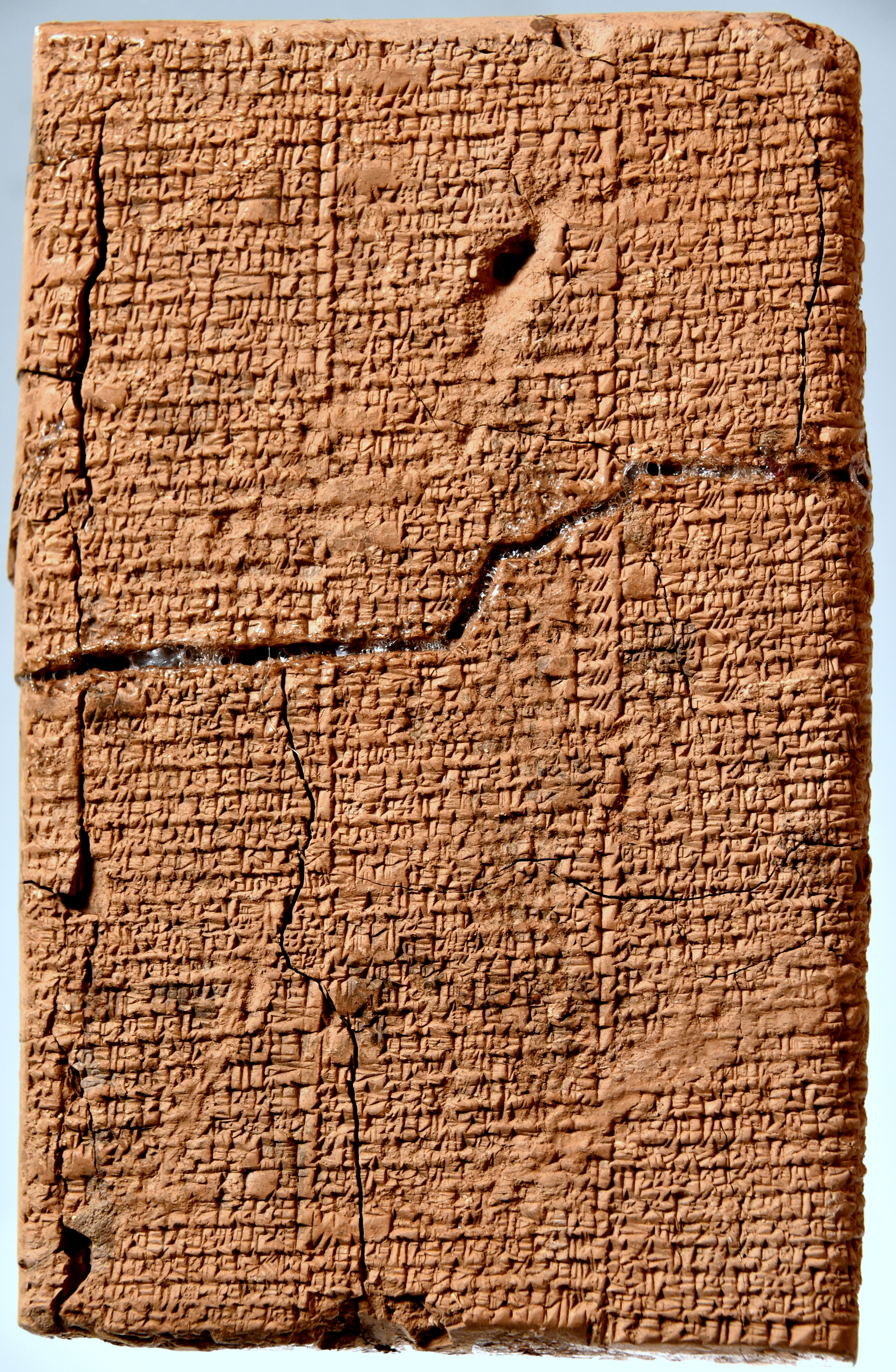
Obverse. The story of Lugalbanda in the Mountain Cave, Old-Babylonian period, from southern Iraq. Sulaymaniyah Museum, Iraqi Kurdistan

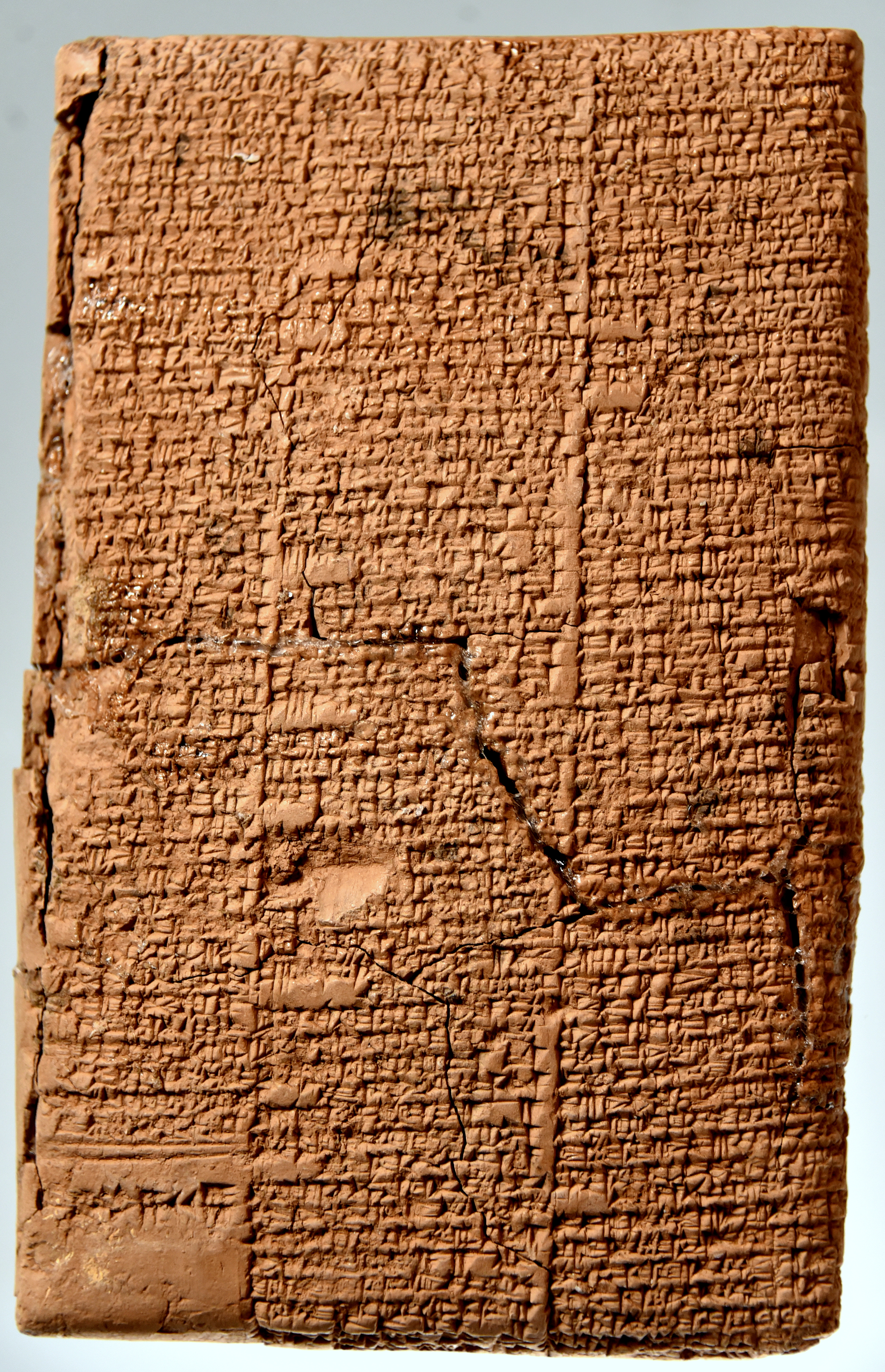
Reverse. The story of Lugalbanda in the Mountain Cave, Old-Babylonian period, from southern Iraq. Sulaymaniyah Museum, Iraqi Kurdistan

== Synopsis ==
Sumerian king Enmerkar wants to conquer the land of Aratta. Rounding up his army, Enmerkar marches toward Aratta, a city on the eastern highlands. Amongst the soldiers is Lugalbanda, who falls seriously ill and is left by his brothers to live or die in a cave along with some provisions. Lugalbanda lies ill for two days; he prays to the gods Shamash, Inanna, and Nanna to be healed of his sickness and is eventually healed by them. A few days later he captures a wild bull and two wild goats before lying down to dream. He is sent a dream instructing him to sacrifice the animals he has captured and he proceeds to do so. The end of the text is very fragmented and not well understood, but sheds light on the gods who, although they hold great power, exhibit a dark side.

== Comments ==
In separate Sumerian traditions, specifically in the text referred to as Sumerian King List, Lugalbanda is known as the successor of Enmerkar as the king of Uruk, but in these Lugalbanda stories there is no such indication, and Lugalbanda appears only as one of the soldiers of king Enmerkar. In other accounts Lugalbanda is also known as the father of the mythical hero Gilgamesh, who succeeds Lugalbanda to the throne of Uruk.

Among Sumerian literary narratives including the four of Enmerkar-Aratta cycle and five known Gilgamesh stories, “Lugalbanda in the Wilderness” and its continuation “Lugalbanda and the Anzu Bird” are considered to be the most elaborate and complex texts of their period with a combined length of 1000 lines, as well as their complicated symbolism, strong mythological elements, and unpredictable plot that moves back and forth between the mundane and divine worlds.

Although earlier generations of scholars have sought behind these stories a historical reality dating back to Early Dynastic Period, such attempts are mostly based on an amalgamation of data from the epic traditions of the 2nd millennium with unclear archaeological observations. It is argued that even if the earlier oral traditions may have had an influence in the origin of these stories, the texts that have reached us are the highly stylized and literary products of the scribes of the Ur III Period and later, and for such scribes “these texts were about the present, albeit projected into the past; indeed it is this very act of projection that marks them as fiction, not as ethnography or history.”

== Prologue ==
Like Gilgamesh, Enkidu, and the Netherworld, the Song of the hoe, and the Sumerian disputation poems, the Lugalbanda story begins with a cosmological prologue. The following translation of it is taken from Gadotti 2014.

1. [In distant days, when heaven had been separated from earth]. 2. [In distant days?] when that which is eminently suitable … 3. When the ancient harvest … barley … 4. When [boundaries?] had been laid out and the land had been demarcated, 5. When [boundary-stones] had been erected and names had been inscribed, 6. When levees and canals had been cleaned, 7. When … wells had been dug straight down, 8. When the Euphrates River, the bountiful river of Uruk, had been opened up, 9. When … had been erected, 10. When … had been established, 11. When bright An had torn away […], 12. When the offices of en-ship and kingship have been made manifest in Uruk, 13. When the scepter and the staff of Kulaba had been raised in battle, 14. In battle, Inana’s playground, 15. When the black-headed (people) had been blessed with a long life (…).
