= Lake Hammar =

- Location within Iraq
- Interactive map of Lake Hammar
- Coordinates: 30°46′0″N 47°3′0″E
- Type: saline lake
- Basin countries: Iraq
- Surface area: 600–1,350 km^{2} (230–520 sq mi)
- Max. depth: 1.8 m (5.9 ft) (winter); 3.0 m (9.8 ft) (spring)

Lake Hammar (Arabic: هور الحمّار, Hawr al-Ḥammār) is a saline lake in southeastern part of Iraq within the Hammar Marshes. It has an area of 600–1,350 km^{2}. Water level in the lake fluctuates, with maximum depths varying from 1.8 metres (winter) to 3.0 metres (spring). The lake is an important wetland site for birds. The native inhabitants are Marsh Arabs, some of whom occupy villages on artificial, floating islands.

Hammar Lacus, a feature on Titan, the moon of Saturn, is named after Hammar Lake.

Lake Hammar is featured in the 2024 videogame Indiana Jones and the Great Circle.
