= Abu Salabikh =

Archaeological site in Iraq

- Location within Iraq
- 32°16′00″N 45°05′00″E
- Type: Settlement
- Location: Al-Qādisiyyah Governorate, Iraq
- Region: Mesopotamia

History
- Built: Early Uruk period

Site notes
- Excavation dates: 1963-65, 1975–90
- Archaeologists: Donald P. Hansen, Nicholas Postgate

The archaeological site of Abu Salabikh (Tell Abū Ṣalābīkh), around 20 km (12 mi) northwest of the site of ancient Nippur and about 150 kilometers southeast of the modern city of Baghdad in Al-Qādisiyyah Governorate, Iraq marks the site of a small Sumerian city that existed from the Neolithic through the late 3rd millennium, with cultural connections to the cities of Kish, Mari and Ebla. Its ancient name is unknown though Eresh and Kesh have been suggested as well as Gišgi. Kesh was suggested by Thorkild Jacobsen before excavations began. More recently, Eresh has been proposed. The Euphrates was the city's highway and lifeline; when it shifted its old bed (which was identified to the west of the Main Mound by coring techniques), in the late third millennium BC, the city dwindled away. Only eroded traces remain on the site's surface of habitation after the Early Dynastic Period. There is another small archaeological site named Abu-Salabikh in the Hammar Lake region of Southern Iraq, which has been suggested as the possible capital of the Sealand dynasty.

== History ==
Although signs of occupation at the site date back to the Neolithic period, primary occupation occurred during the Uruk period in the Late Chalcolithic and then in the Jemdat Nasr and Early Dynastic II/III periods in the Early Bronze Age. Potsherds from the Late Akkadian or Ur III period were found in a pit on the main mound but no occupational layers were found. An inscripted brick of Ur III ruler Amar-Sin was later found on the site. An examination of the smaller outlying sites nearby showed there was also occupation in the Kassite, Sassanian, Seleucid, and Parthian periods in the area.

== Archaeology ==
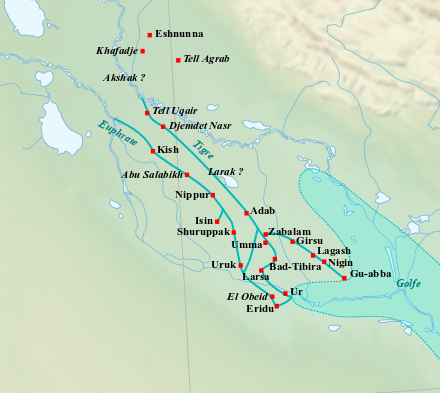
Mesopotamia during the Early Dynastic period

The site consists of three mounds primary mounds (Main, Uruk, South) and several subsidiary mounds. The Main Mound is about 12 hectares in area and enclosed by a defensive wall. To the southwest is the 10 hectare Uruk and Jemdet Nasr mound. To the southwest is the 8 hectare South mound with its large Early Dynastic III structure. The full extent of the site, with outer margins now under alluvial deposits, is estimated at 50 hectares.

- Main mound - excavations occurred in two sections of the Main mound, Area A in the northwest section and Area E in the southeast section exposing 25% of the mound in total, The Early Dynastic city uncovered had wide main streets, up to 8 meters in width, intersected by much narrower lanes, Numerous Early Dynastic III period cuneiform tablets were found in Area E in the sounding of 1963 and a few more from the floor of Room 48 in Area E by the later excavations, the city wall was constructed with 18 meter wide packed dirt in the north, plano-convex bricks of over 4 meter width on the other sides, the local water table prevented it from being excavated completely A number of graves, some looted in antiquity, were found along with their associated grave goods. Over one hundred pottery shards that had been filed into 3 centimeter discs and pierced were found in a ash tip on the south part of the Main mound and suggested for use in abacus type counting devices.
- Uruk mound - southeast of the main mound, occupied from the Early to Late Uruk periods abandoned after the Jemdet Nasr period (surface shards only). A sounding was conducted in 1963 and an extensive excavation performed in 1978. Domestic architecture used the hallmark Uruk period Riemchen bricks.A wall, up to 20 meters in width, was found along the west side of the mound with about 300 meters, from north to south, recovered. About 1650 high fired clay sickles were found. Two grain samples from the Middle Uruk layer of the Uruk Mound were accelerator radiocarbon dated with calibrated dates of 3520 ± 130 BC. Calibration was based on that of Pearson. A Uruk period defensive wall up to 20 meters thick was found. Seventy-four Neolithic clay accounting tokens were found on the Uruk mound.
- South Mound - lying 400 meters to the southeast of the Main Mound and outside its city wall, a height of about 2.5 meters along the old river course, examined only by surface clearance which found Early Dynastic III pottery, fire installations, flint and bead working debitage, and a 50 meter by 50 meter well constructed structure which the excavators suggested was a palace
- West mound - west of the main mound, surface collection only was performed, noted occupation was all from the Early Dynastic I period and while internal separation walls were found there were no defensive wall. From Middle Uruk shards found in the southeast part of the mound it has been suggested that the ED I settlement was built over an earlier Uruk occupation.
- Outlying mounds - very low mounds designated Eastern Mound, North-West Mound, and North-East Mound and only lightly examined, fragments of a standard brick inscription of Ur III ruler Amar-Sin were found on the Eastern Mound and Early Dynastic III graves on the North-Eastern Mound.

The site was first noted, as site A275 - (Ishan) Abu Salabikh, in a regional survey in 1957. Abu Salabikh was first excavated by an American expedition from the Oriental Institute of Chicago led by Donald P. Hansen with and Vaughn E. Crawford for six weeks in 1963 and two weeks in 1965. They found the site, lying in a salt bog, had numerous robber holes. Unlike the nearby site of Nippur which continued to be occupied for millennia, at Abu Salabikh the Early Dynastic remains were near the surface. The expedition found, in Area E of the Main Mound around 500 cuneiform tablets and fragments, containing some of the earliest ancient literature. A number of animal remains were also found including domestic dog, lion, equid, pig, cattle, gazelle, caprines (sheep and goat), and antelope. Remains of various birds were also found.

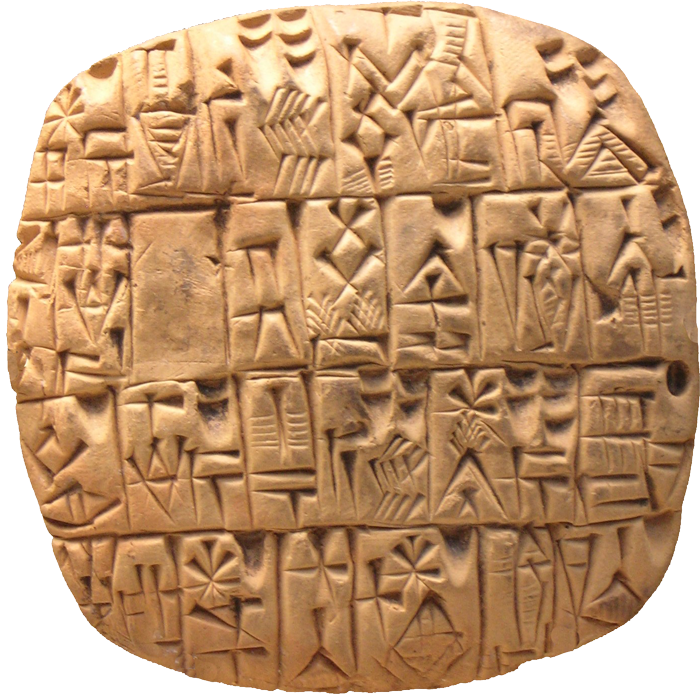
Sumerian ED IIIa field prebends account of silver for the governor, found at Abu Salabikh)

In 1973 a contour survey of the site was made using a theodolite, producing a contour plan. Between 1975 and 1990 Abu Salabikh was excavated by a British School of Archaeology in Iraq team under the direction of Nicholas Postgate. Finds included beveled rim bowls. Excavations were suspended in 1990 with the Invasion of Kuwait and have not been resumed. The city, built on a rectilinear plan in the early Uruk period, revealed a small but important repertory of cuneiform texts on some 500 tablets, of which the originals were stored in the Iraq Museum, Baghdad.

=== Cuneiform texts ===
Cuneiform texts, dated to the Early Dynastic IIIa period and mostly unbaked and fragile, were found in the early excavations in Area E and Area A of the Main mound. They are comparable in date and content with texts from Shuruppak (modern Fara, Iraq) included school texts, literary texts, word lists, and some administrative archives, as well as the Instructions of Shuruppak, a well-known Sumerian "wisdom' text of which the Abu Salabikh tablet is the oldest copy. While the writing remained Sumerian, Semitic scribal names became more common as the Early Dynastic period wore on. The Semitic names, termed as Proto-Akkadian by the excavator, were especially found in the cuneiform tablet colophons. The archaic form of Sumerian in the texts is not fully understood however a number of literary compositions were found that had beforehand been thought to have not existed until half a millennium later in the Old Babylonian period. Originally it was thought that the tablet, contemporary with the ones found at Fara were dated to the period of Early Dynastic III ruler of First dynasty of Lagash Ur-Nanshe (c. 2500 BC). Subsequent study pushed the dating to a century before Ur-Nanshe though it has also been suggested that the dating was after Ur-Nanshe though before Eannatum of Lagash, his grandson. This is still an open issue.

== Eresh ==
The city of Eresh (eréš^{ki}) is known from the Early Dynastic, through the Akkadian period into the Ur III period and then apparently disappears from history though a year name of Sin-Muballit (c. 1813-1792 BC) is "Year Sin-muballity built the city wall of Eresz". Its location is unknown though earlier Uruk was proposed and more recently Abu-Salabikh and Jarin. One tablet found at Abu Salabikh (IAS 505) did mention workers belonging to a "King of Eresh". Its city-god was Nisaba, whose cult site was later moved to Nippur. Eresh appears on an Early Dynastic geographical list. It is known that during the reign of the second Ur III Empire ruler Shulgi there was a governor of Eresh named Ea-Bani and one named Ur-Ninmug, and under Amar-Sin one named Ur-Baba. In the Ur III period there was a shrine to the goddess Annunitum at Eresh. In the Great Revolt against Naram-Sin, ruler of the Akkadian Empire those captured included "the General (nu-banda_{3}) of Ereš and the ensi of Ereš".

Enheduanna, daughter of Sargon of Akkad, the first ruler of the Akkadian Empire wrote a collection of 42 Temple Hymns, with the final one, which survives in fragmentary form, dedicated to E-Zagin, the temple of Nisaba in Eresh.

"House of Stars. House of Lapis Lazuli, sparkling bright, you open the way to all the lands ... are set in the shrine. Eresh. Each month, the ancient lords raise their head for you. On the hill, soap ... The great goddess Nisaba has brought the great powers from heaven, adding to your powers ... Righteous woman of unmatched mind. Soothing ... and opening her mouth, consulting a tablet of lapis lazuli, giving guidance to all the lands. Righteous woman, cleansing soap, born to the upright stylus. She measures the heavens and outlines the earth:All praise Nisaba."

In the Hymn to Nisaba it states "Eresh he has constructed in abundance".

In the Sumerian literary composition Enmerkar and En-suhgir-ana, a sorcerer, Urgirinuna, goes to Eresh and makes all the cows and goats stop giving milk. In the Sumerian literary composition Marriage of Enlil and Sud it reads "He (Enlil) said, "Quick, please, Nuska, I will give you instructions about this, I want to send you to Eresh, Nidaba's city, the city whose grounds are august".

== See also ==
- Cities of the Ancient Near East
- List of Mesopotamian dynasties
