= Enmerkar =

Builder of Uruk in Sumer

Enmerkar 𒂗𒈨𒅕𒃸
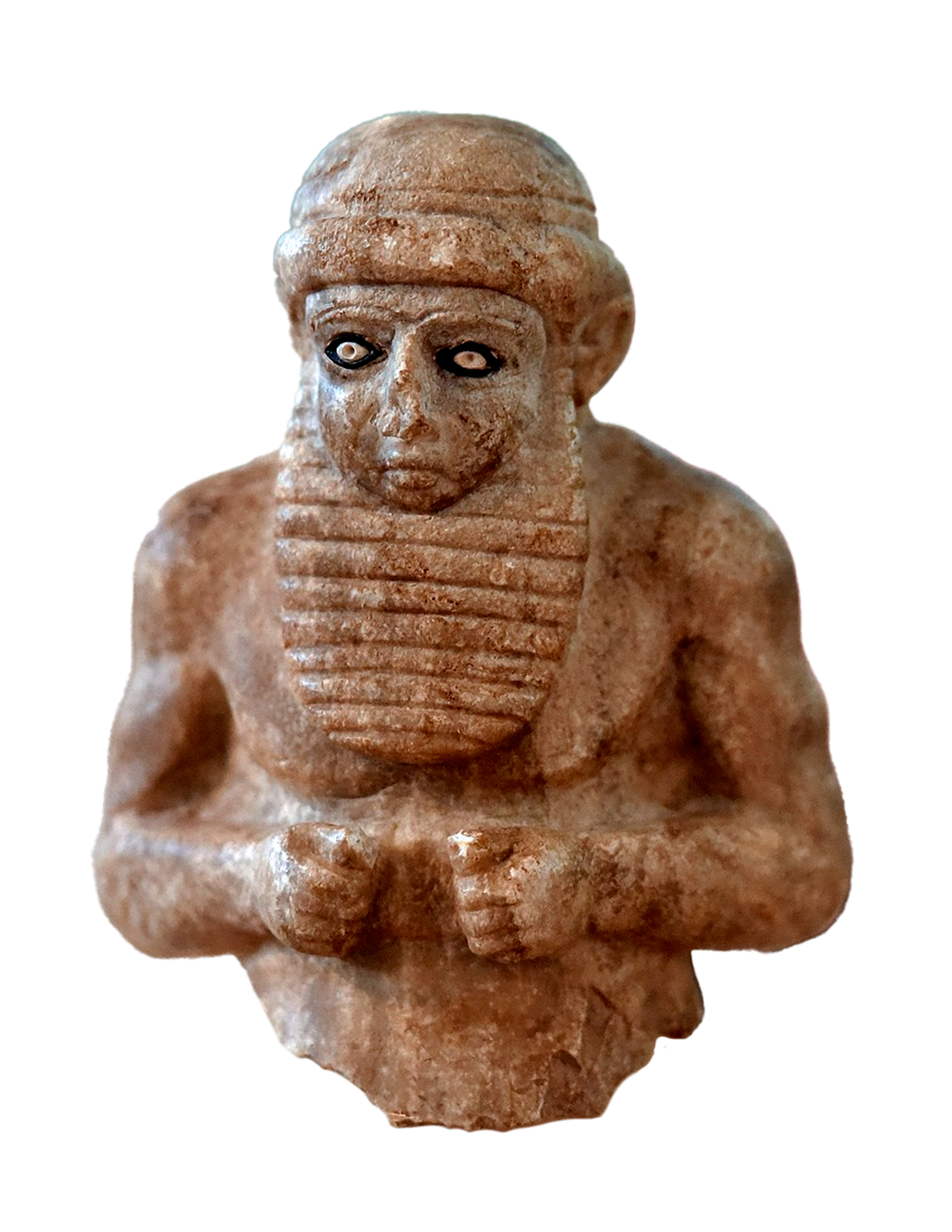
- Priest-king of Uruk from the Late Uruk Period

King of Uruk
- Reign: c. 2750 BC
- Dynasty: Uruk 1

Enmerkar (Note: While the etymology still is unclear, "the 'Lord' (is / has) a glowing giant snake" has been proposed.) (Note: Sumerian: 𒂗𒈨𒅕𒃸, romanized: Enmerkar) (fl. c. 2750 BC) was an ancient Sumerian ruler to whom the construction of the city of Uruk and a 420-year reign (Note: Some copies read 900 years.) was attributed. According to literary sources, he led various campaigns against the land of Aratta.

He is credited in Sumerian legend as the inventor of writing. An excerpt of an ancient text states, "Because the messenger's mouth was heavy and he couldn't repeat (the message), the Lord of Kulaba (Enmerkar) patted some clay and put words on it, like a tablet. Until then, there had been no putting words on clay." This is the earliest known story in history about the invention of writing.

== Historical king ==
=== Late Uruk period ===
The tradition of Enmerkar as the founder of Uruk seems to date from the Jemdet Nasr period (3100-2900 BC) as found in the Ad-gi4 list. The lexical list mentions Enmerkar and his wife Enmerkarzi as the builders of a town and the bringers of agriculture. A bilingual edition of the list has been found at Nineveh, indicating that the tradition was transmitted into the first millennium.

Enmerkar and (his) wife Enmerkar-zi,
who know (how to build) towns (made) brick and brick pavements.
When the yearly flood reached its proper level,
(they made) irrigation canals and all kinds of irrigation ditches.

Despite his proclaimed divine descent from the poems, Enmerkar was not deified as were his successors Lugalbanda and Gilgamesh. These two last kings were already listed in the god lists of Shuruppak and received offerings during the Ur III period (2112–2004 BC). It concluded that Enmerkar was only remembered as the founder and first king of Uruk.

=== Expeditions to Aratta ===
Enmerkar's campaigns against Aratta
Date	c. 3250 BC
Location	Aratta (now Iraq)
Result	Uruk victory

Belligerents
Uruk	Aratta

Commanders and leaders
Enmerkar	unknown

Casualties and losses
unknown	unknown

Some scholars have looked for historical matter in the literature deeds of Enmerkar and the land of Aratta. For example, an archaic tablet from Uruk recording the title "Lord of Aratta" was given as a reason to believe the traditions surrounding Enmerkar's deeds were based in reality. Moreover, there are suggestions that Enmerkar and his administration may be factually attributed as the first person/people to put cuneiform to clay tablets; and that writing did indeed exist before Enmerkar, citing the fact that the Lord of Aratta understood the message, but those writing were previously done in different materials.

However, Assyriologist Dina Katz states that any attempt to find a historical explanation of the legendary account invalidates the claim that Enmerkar invented the clay tablet and the writing system, and weakens the important ideological purpose of the narrative. She further asserts that the poem claiming writing as an invention by the founder of the first Sumerian city after the flood is a political and ethnic statement.

=== Akkad ===
During the reign of Naram-Sin of Akkad, the king accused Enmerkar of not recording his experience on a stele, so as a consequence he holds him responsible for a defeat in war and the devastation of Akkad.

== Matter of Aratta ==
The Matter of Aratta is a group of four narrative poems in Sumerian, dealing with the various ways Enmerkar won supremacy over the legendary city of Aratta. The main motif of all four poems is the defeat of Aratta throughout the wilderness by nonmilitary means to win the favor of the goddess Inanna. The cycle originated in the Ur III period (2112–2004 BC) and was the subject of scribal schools from Ur and Nippur during the Isin-Larsa period (2017–1763 BC). The poems, aimed to praise the glorious past of Uruk, were a political movement of the Third Dynasty of Ur to consolidate themselves as the legitimate and spiritual heirs of the ancient rulers of Uruk.

=== Enmerkar and the Lord of Aratta ===
In Enmerkar and the Lord of Aratta, Enmerkar, king of Uruk, wants to embellish his city with precious metals and stones, goods that are only found in the wealthy city of Aratta, which lies behind the mountains. Inanna, which is the goddess of Aratta, favors Enmerkar and advises him to send a messenger with a challenge to Aratta, requisitioning what he wants and enforcing his claim by stating that she favors him. Enmerkar casts the spell of Nudimmud, which makes Enlil reunite all the languages (of Shubur, Hamazi, Sumer, Akkad, and the Martu land) into one in order to enable debates between kings. The lord of Aratta refuses but wants to enter into a contest with Enmerkar to see on which side Inanna lay. The unnamed lord of Aratta sends three riddles to reconsider his submission:

- To cart grain to Aratta in open nets instead of bags, Enmerkar uses sprouting barley to close the interstices of the nets so that no grain is spilled.
- To bring a scepter made of no existing material, Enmerkar prepares a gluelike plastic substance that he pours into a hollow reed; after it has hardened, he breaks away the reed mold.
- To bring a dog of no known color to fight his own dog, to which Enmerkar weaves a cloth of no known color.

The messenger complains that the messages have become too long and difficult to remember and reproduce. Enmerkar invents writing, which throws the lord of Aratta into despair. The land of Aratta suffers famine and drought. Inanna confirms her predilection for Enmerkar but also tells him to institute peaceful trade with Aratta from now on.

=== Enmerkar and Ensuhgirana ===
Ensuhgirana, lord of Aratta, claims to be the recipient of Inanna's favors and demands the submission of Uruk. Enmerkar refuses and points out that he is the only true and constant lover of Inanna, however, the lord of Aratta refuses to submit to Uruk. A sorcerer from Hamazi offers his services to break the stalemate, services which are accepted by Enshugirana. The wizard casts a spell on the cattle of the goddess Nisaba, and there is a famine in Sumer. Utu sends a wise woman who catches up with the wizard on the banks of the Euphrates, both start a competition of magic. The wizard throws fish spawn in the river and draws out an animal; five times the wise woman draws out another animal which hunts the wizard's animal. The wizard admits his defeat and pleads for his life, but he is killed and the spell is broken. Ensuhgirana admits defeat and submits to Enmerkar.

=== Lugalbanda poems ===
In the Lugalbanda poems (Lugalbanda in the Mountain Cave and Lugalbanda and the Anzud Bird) Enmerkar marches against Aratta; his warchief, Lugalbanda, falls ill and is abandoned in a cave. He feasts on Anzud's chick and gains the legendary bird's favor. Lugalbanda is rewarded with the gift of speed and goes to Enmerkar, who is laying siege to Aratta. The king sends Lugalbanda to ask for Inanna's advice in Uruk. At the end, Aratta submits. The text also mentions that fifty years into Enmerkar's reign, the Martu people had arisen in all of Sumer and Akkad, necessitating the building of a wall in the desert to protect Uruk.

== Later influence ==
=== In antiquity ===
In a much later Greek legend related by Aelian (c. 200 AD), the king of Babylon, Euechoros or Seuechoros (also appearing in many variants as Sevekhoros, earlier Sacchoras, etc.), is said to be the grandfather of Gilgamos, who later becomes king of Babylon (i.e., Gilgamesh of Uruk). Several recent scholars have suggested that this "Seuechoros" or "Euechoros" is, moreover, to be identified with Enmerkar of Uruk, as well as the fictional Euechous named by Berossus as being the first king of Chaldea and Assyria. This last name, Euechous (also appearing as Evechius, and in many other variants), has, along with a number of other fictional and real Mesopotamian rulers, been identified with the historically unattested biblical figure of Nimrod.

=== Identification as Nimrod ===
The historian David Rohl has claimed parallels between Enmerkar, builder of Uruk, and Nimrod, ruler of biblical Erech (Uruk), who, according to some extra-biblical legends, was supposedly the architect of the Tower of Babel. One parallel Rohl has noted is between the epithet "the Hunter", applied to Nimrod, and the suffix "-kar" at the end of Enmerkar's name, which means "hunter". Rohl has also argued that Eridu near Ur is the original site of the city of Babel and that the incomplete ziggurat found there is none other than the Biblical tower itself.

== Notes ==
Regnal titles
Preceded by	Sumerian ruler En of Uruk c. 2750 BC	Succeeded by
