= Kuwaiti Government in exile =

Exiled government in 1990 and 1991

State of Kuwait Kuwaiti Government in exile الحكومة الكويتية في المنفى
- 1990–1991
- Flag Coat of arms
- Status: Government-in-exile
- Capital-in-exile: Taif, Saudi Arabia
- Emir
  - 1990–1991: Jaber III
- Prime minister and military governor
  - 1990–1991: Saad Al-Salim Al-Sabah
- Historical era: Gulf War
  - Invasion of Kuwait: 2 August 1990
  - Liberation of Kuwait: 26 February 1991
- ISO 3166 code: KW
Preceded by	Succeeded by
State of Kuwait	State of Kuwait

The Kuwaiti Government-in-exile (Arabic: الحكومة الكويتية في المنفى) was the government-in-exile of Kuwait following Ba'athist Iraq's invasion and occupation of Kuwait during the Persian Gulf War.

== History ==
On 2 August 1990, Sheikh Jaber Al-Ahmad Al-Jaber Al-Sabah and senior members of his government fled to Saudi Arabia, where they set up a government-in-exile in Taif. Iraqi occupation forces established a rival government, the Republic of Kuwait, before annexing the country on 28 August 1990. In March 1991, following the defeat of Ba'athist Iraq at the hands of coalition forces in the Persian Gulf War, the Emir and his government were able to return to Kuwait.

== See also ==
- Kuwait Governorate
- Saddamiyat al-Mitla' District
