= Liberation of Kuwait campaign =

1991 ground offensive into Iraqi-occupied Kuwait

Liberation of Kuwait
- Part of the Gulf War
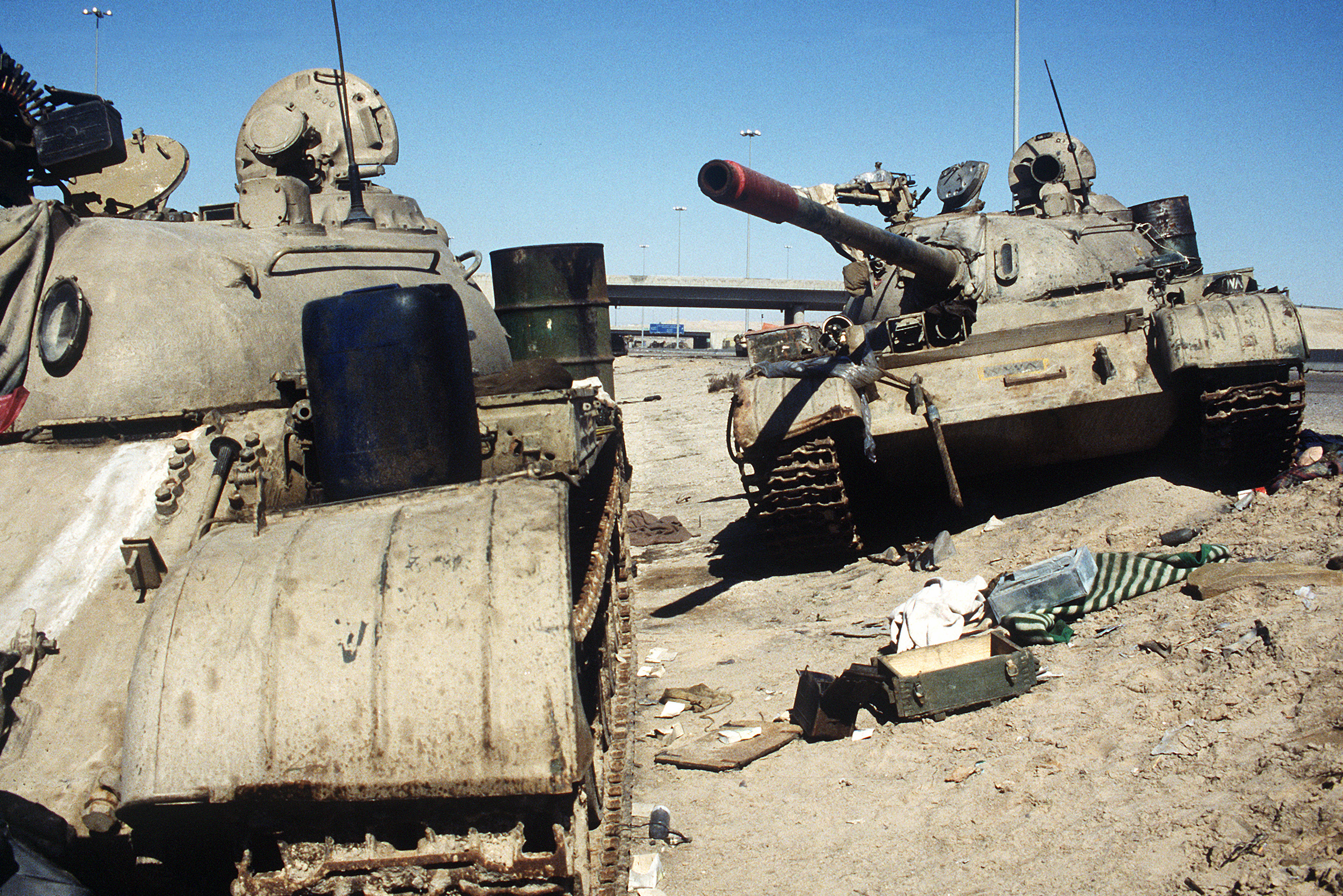
- Two abandoned Iraqi T-55s of 26th Armored Brigade, 5th Mechanized Division "Muhammad ibn al Qasim" near Kuwait City (26 February 1991)
Date	24–28 February 1991
Location	Kuwait, Iraq, and the Persian Gulf
Result	Coalition victory
Territorial changes	Restoration of Kuwaiti sovereignty: Renunciation of the "Saddamiyat al-Mitla' District" and the "Kuwait Governorate" by Iraq

Belligerents
(United Nations) Coalition; United States; United Kingdom; France; Canada; Kuwait (in exile); Saudi Arabia; Egypt; Syria; Bangladesh; Italy; Czechoslovakia	Iraq

Commanders and leaders
George H W Bush; Norman Schwarzkopf Jr. Colin Powell; Peter de la Billière; Khalid bin Sultan al-Saud; Nuruddin Khan (Appointed by the order of Khaleda Zia) (Italy) Mario Arpino	(Ba'athist Iraq) Saddam Hussein (Ba'athist Iraq) Ali Hassan al-Majid

Strength
650,000	500,000

Casualties and losses
1,155 casualties 70 captured	20,000–35,000 casualties 150,000 captured

The Liberation of Kuwait campaign was between 24 and 28 February 1991, consisting of a major ground offensive into Iraqi-occupied Kuwait following the successful Gulf War air campaign. Approximately 650,000 troops of the American-led 42-country coalition swept into Kuwait to find the bulk of the 500,000 Iraqi troops surrendering en masse, but there were still pockets of resistance in some parts of the country. A particularly fierce battle took place at Kuwait International Airport, where Iraqi troops, seemingly unaware that a retreat order had been issued to them, continued to fight against the coalition's advance. By the end of February, Kuwait was declared free of the Iraqi occupation. The coalition then proceeded to push into Iraq, where the majority of the fighting occurred. Shortly thereafter, combat operations ceased and the Gulf War was brought to a close.

== Prelude ==
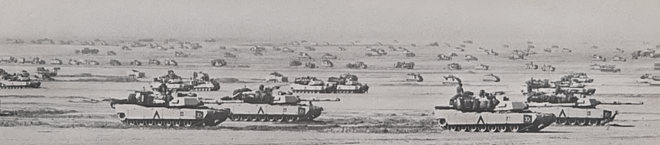
Tanks from the 3rd Armored Division brigade along the Line of Departure

A force composed of 40 amphibious assault ships was stationed off the coast of Kuwait and Saudi Arabia. It was the largest such force to be assembled since the Battle of Inchon. Days before the attack, an amphibious force made repeated feint attacks and landings at Kuwait City, attempting to fool the Iraqis into thinking the coalition would attack via amphibious assault. Instead, the troops were to enter the southern border of Kuwait.

== Campaign ==
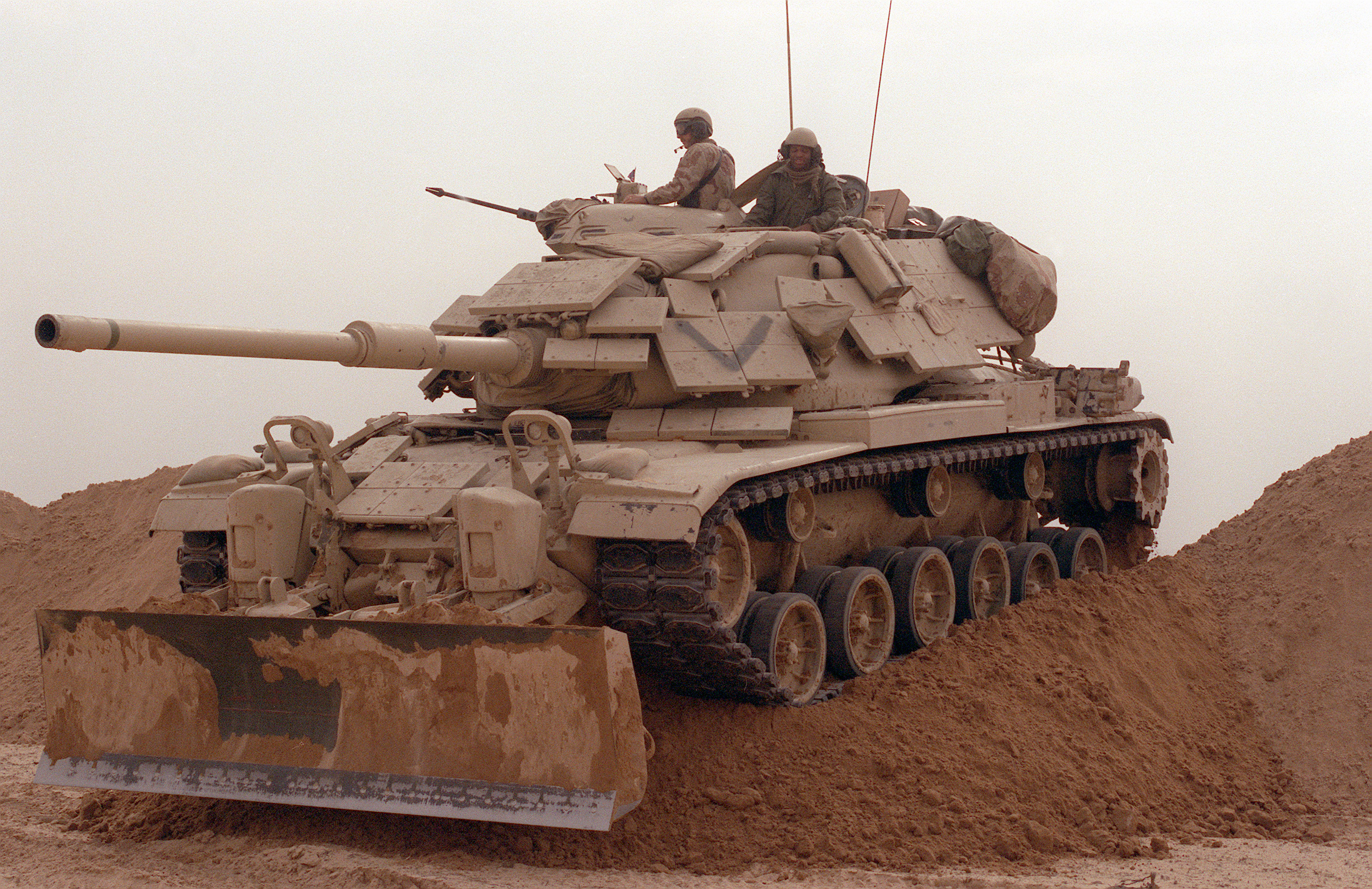
An American M60 tank breaching the Iraqi defense line in Kuwait on 24 February

At 4 a.m. on 24 February, after being shelled for months and under the constant threat of a gas attack, the U.S. 1st and 2nd Marine Divisions crossed into Kuwait. They maneuvered around vast systems of barbed wire, minefields, and trenches. Once in Kuwait, they headed towards Kuwait City. The troops themselves encountered little resistance and, apart from several minor tank battles, were met primarily by surrendering soldiers. The general pattern was that coalition troops would encounter Iraqi soldiers who would put up a brief fight before deciding to surrender.

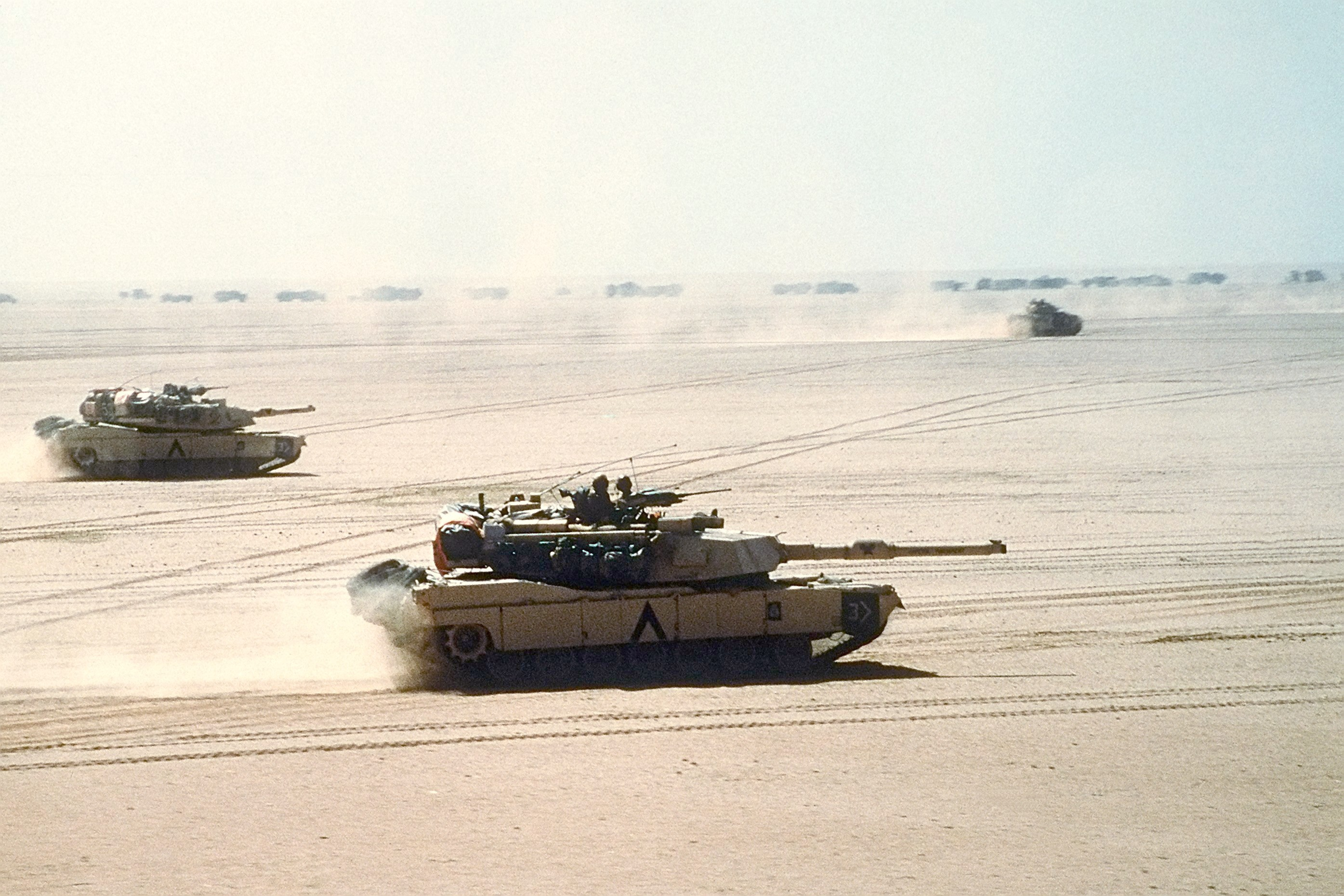
An M1 Abrams tank moving out during the Gulf War

On 27 February, Saddam Hussein issued a retreat order to his troops in Kuwait; however, one unit of Iraqi troops appeared to have not gotten the retreat order. When the U.S. Marines arrived at Kuwait International Airport, they encountered fierce resistance, and it took them several hours to gain control and secure the airport. As part of the retreat order, the Iraqis carried out a "scorched earth" policy that included setting hundreds of oil wells on fire in an effort to destroy the Kuwaiti economy. After the battle of Kuwait International Airport, the U.S. Marines stopped at the outskirts of Kuwait City, allowing their coalition allies to take and occupy Kuwait City, effectively ending combat operations in the Kuwaiti theater of the war.

== Result ==
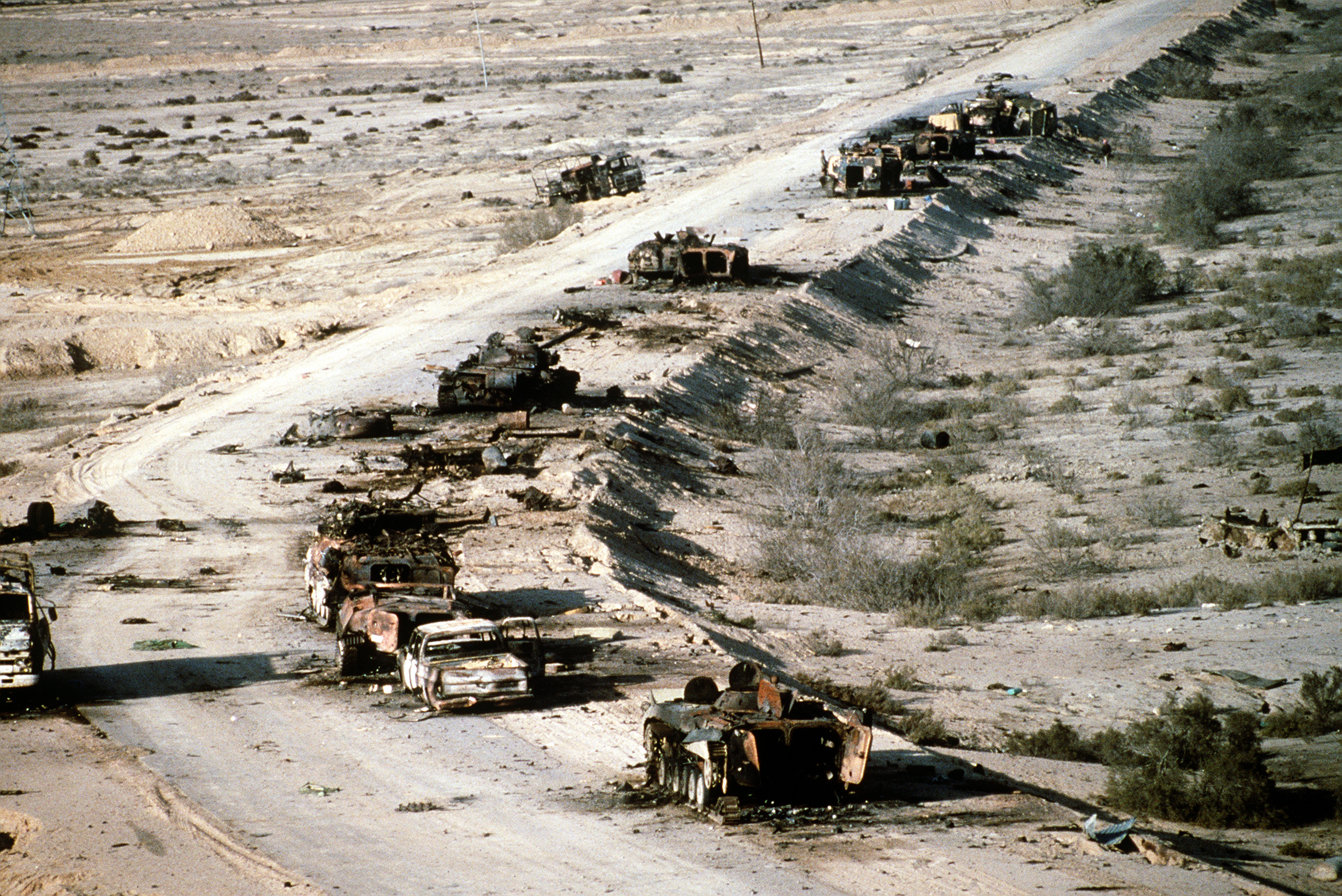
Aerial view of destroyed Iraqi T-72 tank, BMP-1, and Type 63 armored personnel carriers and trucks on Highway 8 in March 1991

After four days of fighting, all Iraqi troops were expelled from Kuwait, ending a nearly seven-month occupation of Kuwait by Iraq. A little over 1,100 casualties were suffered by the coalition. Estimates of Iraqi casualties range from 30,000 to 150,000. Iraq lost thousands of vehicles, while the advancing coalition lost relatively few; Iraq's Soviet T-72 tanks proved no match for the American M1 Abrams and British Challenger tanks.
