= Military occupation =

Effective provisional control of one sovereign power over another sovereign's territory

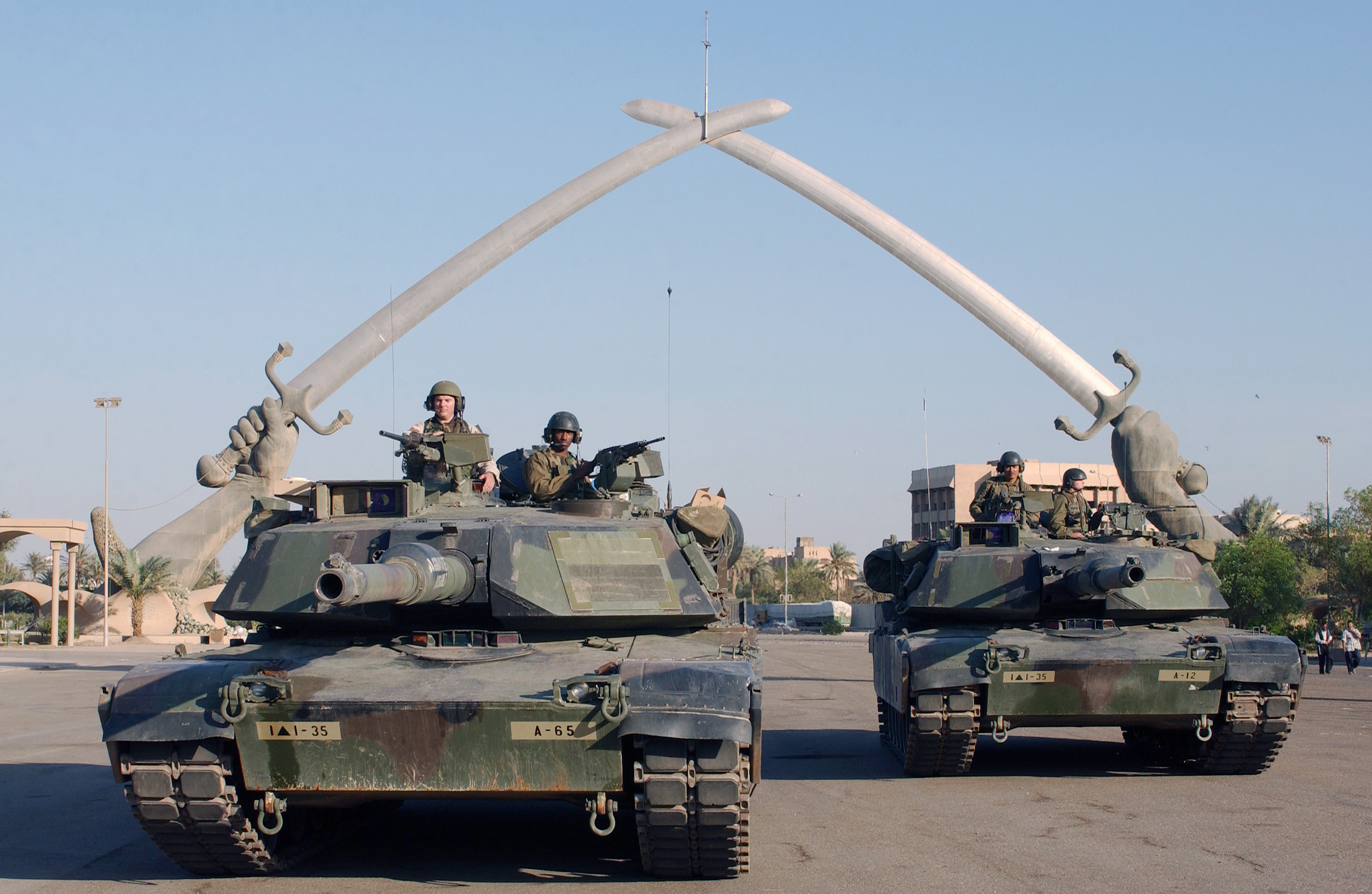
American tanks at the Victory Arch in the city of Baghdad during the occupation of Iraq, 2003

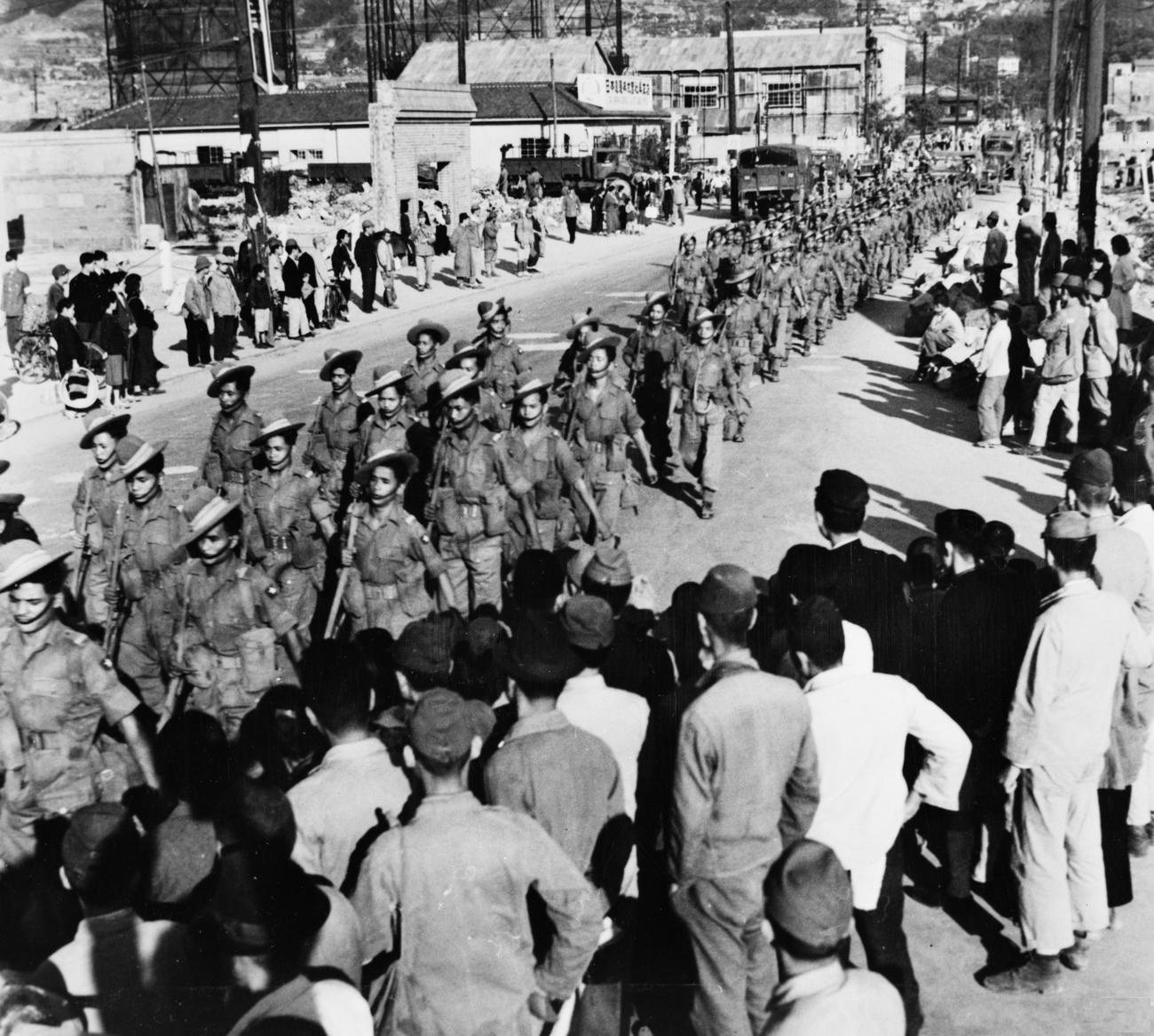
British Indian troops of the 5th Royal Gurkha Rifles in the city of Kure during the Allied occupation of Japan, 1946

Military occupation, also called belligerent occupation or simply occupation, is temporary hostile control exerted by a ruling power's military apparatus over a sovereign territory that is outside the legal boundaries of that ruling power's own sovereign territory. Occupation's intended temporary nature distinguishes it from annexation and colonialism. The occupant often establishes military rule to facilitate administration of the occupied territory, though this is not a necessary characteristic of occupation.

The rules of occupation are delineated in various international agreements—primarily the Hague Convention of 1907, the Geneva Conventions, and also by long-established state practice. The relevant international conventions, the International Committee of the Red Cross, and various treaties by military scholars provide guidelines on topics concerning the rights and duties of the occupying power, the protection of civilians, the treatment of prisoners of war, the coordination of relief efforts, the issuance of travel documents, the property rights of the populace, the handling of cultural and art objects, the management of refugees, and other concerns that are highest in importance both before and after the cessation of hostilities during an armed conflict. A country that engages in a military occupation and violates internationally agreed-upon norms runs the risk of censure, criticism, or condemnation. In the contemporary era, the laws of occupation have largely become a part of customary international law, and form a part of the law of war.

Since World War II and the establishment of the United Nations, it has been common practice in international law for occupied territory to continue to be widely recognized as occupied in cases where the occupant attempts to alter—with or without support or recognition from other powers—the expected temporary duration of the territory's established power structure, namely by making it permanent through annexation (formal or otherwise) and refusing to recognize itself as an occupant. Additionally, the question of whether a territory is occupied or not becomes especially controversial if two or more powers disagree with each other on that territory's status; such disputes often serve as the basis for armed conflicts in and of themselves.

== Occupation and the laws of war ==
A dominant principle that guided combatants through much of history was "to the victor belong the spoils". Emer de Vattel, in The Law of Nations (1758), presented an early codification of the distinction between annexation of territory and military occupation, the latter being regarded as temporary, due to the natural right of states to their "continued existence". According to Eyal Benvenisti's The International Law of Occupation, Second Edition (2012), "The foundation upon which the entire [modern] law of occupation is based is the principle of inalienability of sovereignty through unilateral action of a foreign power, [and from this principle] springs the basic structural constraints that international law imposes upon the occupant."

The Hague Convention of 1907 codified these customary laws, specifically within "Laws and Customs of War on Land" (Hague IV); 18 October 1907: "Section III Military Authority over the territory of the hostile State". The first two articles of that section state:

Art. 42.
Territory is considered occupied when it is actually placed under the authority of the hostile army.
The occupation extends only to the territory where such authority has been established and can be exercised.

Art. 43.
The authority of the legitimate power having in fact passed into the hands of the occupant, the latter shall take all the measures in his power to restore, and ensure, as far as possible, public order and safety, while respecting, unless absolutely prevented, the laws in force in the country.

In 1949 these laws governing the occupation of an enemy state's territory were further extended by the adoption of the Fourth Geneva Convention (GCIV). Much of GCIV is relevant to protected civilians in occupied territories and Section III: Occupied territories is a specific section covering the issue. Under GCIV, protected civilians in general are:

- those "who ... find themselves ... in the hands of a Party to the conflict or Occupying Power of which they are not nationals". This generally refers to civilians of an enemy state, including refugees, and stateless persons.
- neutral citizens in occupied territory regardless of diplomatic status.
- refugees of the occupying power prior to hostilities who cannot be arrested, prosecuted, or deported from occupied territory except for crimes committed after the conflict or beforehand which are also crimes under the law of the occupied state that would permit peacetime extradition as defined under Article 70.

Nationals of an enemy state not a signatory or acceded to GCIV are not protected by it. Neutral citizens who are in the home territory of a belligerent nation if their country of origin has diplomatic ties or elsewhere outside occupied territory are not protected. (Note: GCIV only applies the protection of neutral citizens in either occupied territory or in the home territory of a belligerent nation if their country of origin has no diplomatic ties. It was never intended to protect such nationals anywhere else in the world. Thus, the protection of neutral nationals who are outside the two locations mentioned in the preceding sentence are governed by the 1907 Fifth and 13th Hague Conventions.) Nationals of a co-belligerent (allied) state which holds diplomatic ties with a belligerent nation are excluded from protection in both locations.

On whether the definition of military occupation applies to anywhere else, the 2023 United States Department of Defense (DOD)'s Law of War Manual states "the law of belligerent occupation generally does not apply to (1) mere invasion; (2) liberation of friendly territory; (3) non-international armed conflict; or (4) post-war situations (except for certain provisions of the GC [IV])." The DOD's statement is consistent with the definitions provided by Article 42 of the 1907 Fourth Hague Convention and Article 4 of the Fourth Geneva Convention.

Article 6 of GCIV restricts the length of time that most of the convention applies:

The present Convention shall apply from the outset of any conflict or occupation mentioned in Article 2.

In the territory of Parties to the conflict, the application of the present Convention shall cease on the general close of military operations.

In the case of occupied territory, the application of the present Convention shall cease one year after the general close of military operations; however, the Occupying Power shall be bound, for the duration of the occupation, to the extent that such Power exercises the functions of government in such territory, by the provisions of the following Articles of the present Convention: 1 to 12, 27, 29 to 34, 47, 49, 51, 52, 53, 59, 61 to 77, 143.

GCIV emphasised an important change in international law. The United Nations Charter (26 June 1945) had prohibited war of aggression (See articles 1.1, 2.3, 2.4) and GCIV Article 47, the first paragraph in Section III: Occupied territories, restricted the territorial gains which could be made through war by stating:

Protected persons who are in occupied territory shall not be deprived, in any case or in any manner whatsoever, of the benefits of the present Convention by any change introduced, as the result of the occupation of a territory, into the institutions or government of the said territory, nor by any agreement concluded between the authorities of the occupied territories and the Occupying Power, nor by any annexation by the latter of the whole or part of the occupied territory.

Article 49 prohibits the forced mass movement of protected civilians out of or into occupied state's territory:

Individual or mass forcible transfers, as well as deportations of protected persons from occupied territory to the territory of the Occupying Power or to that of any other country, occupied or not, are prohibited, regardless of their motive. ... The Occupying Power shall not deport or transfer parts of its own civilian population into the territory it occupies.

Protocol I (1977): "Protocol Additional to the Geneva Conventions of 12 August 1949, and relating to the Protection of Victims of International Armed Conflicts" has additional articles which cover occupation but many countries including the U.S. are not signatory to this additional protocol.

In the situation of a territorial cession as the result of war, the specification of a "receiving country" in the peace treaty merely means that the country in question is authorized by the international community to establish civil government in the territory. The military government of the principal occupying power will continue past the point in time when the peace treaty comes into force, until it is legally supplanted.

"Military government continues until legally supplanted" is the rule, as stated in Military Government and Martial Law, by William E. Birkhimer, 3rd edition 1914.

== Qualification of a territory as occupied ==
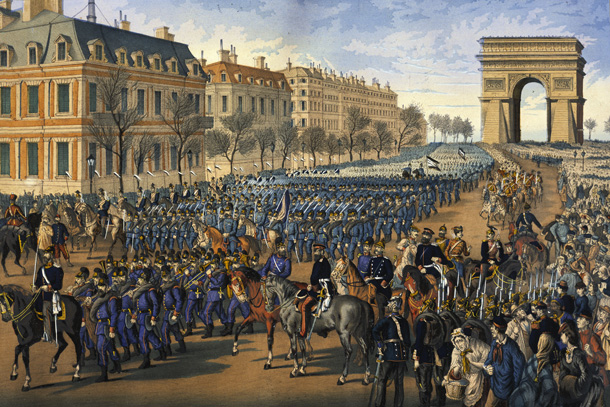
German troops at the Champs-Élysées in the city of Paris during the Prussian occupation of France, 1871

Article 42 under Section III of the 1907 Fourth Hague Convention specifies that a "[t]erritory is considered occupied when it is actually placed under the authority of the hostile army." This definition does not rely on a subjective perception, but rather on the "territory's de facto submission to the authority" of the occupant. Article 2 of the Geneva Conventions indicates that the definition applies to "all cases of partial or total occupation of the territory of a High Contracting party", even if no armed resistance is encountered. The form of administration by which an occupying power exercises government authority over occupied territory is called military government.

There does not have to be a formal announcement of the beginning of a military government, nor is there any requirement of a specific number of people to be in place, for an occupation to commence. Birkhimer writes:

No proclamation of part of the victorious commander is necessary to the lawful inauguration and enforcement of military government. That government results from the fact that the former sovereignty is ousted, and the opposing army now has control. Yet the issuing such proclamation is useful as publishing to all living in the district occupied those rules of conduct which will govern the conqueror in the exercise of his authority. Wellington, indeed, as previously mentioned, said that the commander is bound to lay down distinctly the rules according to which his will is to be carried out. But the laws of war do not imperatively require this, and in very many instances it is not done. When it is not, the mere fact that the country is militarily occupied by the enemy is deemed sufficient notification to all concerned that the regular has been supplanted by a military government. (p. 61)

== Concept of effective control ==
Case-law regarding Article 42 (Note: According to article 42 of the 1907 Fourth Hague Convention, "[t]erritory is considered occupied when it is actually placed under the authority of the hostile army. The occupation applies only to the territory where such authority is established, and in a position to assert itself.") of the 1907 Fourth Hague Convention reveals that interruptions of an occupying power's effective control resulting from insurgents, terrorists or guerrillas that are able to intermittently gain control over areas of the country would be immaterial to the applicability of the law of occupation, and would not alter the legal status of the occupied territory. For example, in 1948 the U.S. Military Tribunal in Nuremberg held that:

In belligerent occupation the occupying power does not hold enemy territory by virtue of any legal right. On the contrary, it merely exercises a precarious and temporary actual control. This can be seen from Article 42 of the Hague Regulations which grants certain well limited rights to a military occupant only in enemy territory which is 'actually placed' under his control.

As of 2012, the physical presence of foreign troops, in the form of "boots on the ground", was considered a "sine qua non requirement of occupation".

== End of occupation and authority shift ==
According to Eyal Benvenisti, occupation can end in a number of ways, such as: "loss of effective control, namely when the occupant is no longer capable of exercising its authority; through the genuine consent of the sovereign (the ousted government or an indigenous one) by the signing of a peace agreement; or by transferring authority to an indigenous government endorsed by the occupied population through referendum and which has received international recognition".

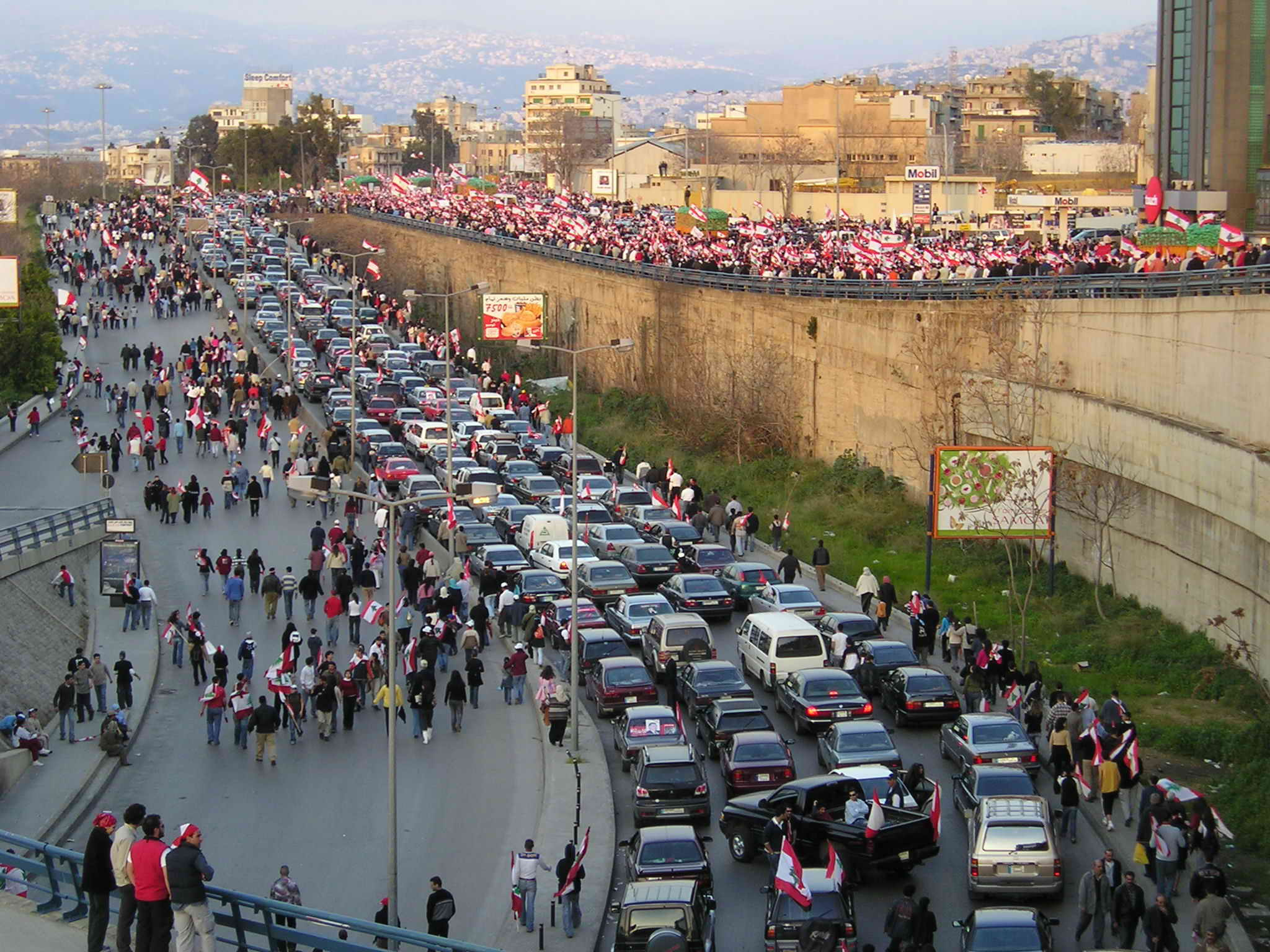
Lebanese protesters of the Cedar Revolution during the Syrian occupation of Lebanon, 2005

== Examples of occupations ==
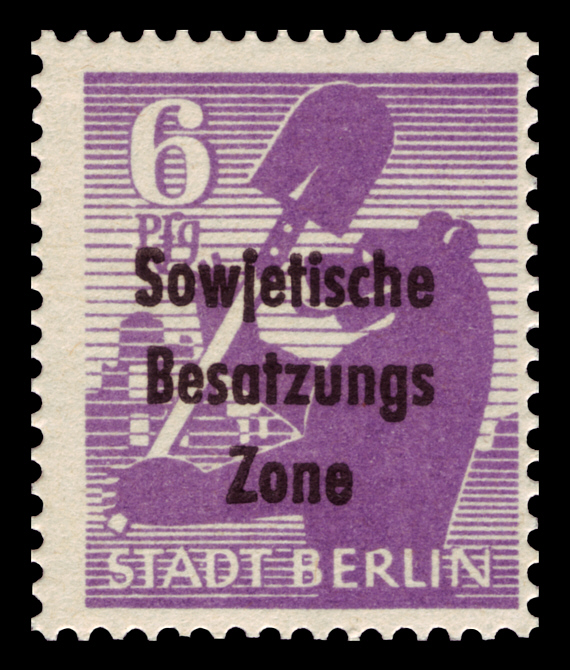
German postage stamp inscribed with "Soviet Occupation Zone" in the city of Berlin, 1948

Some examples of military occupation came into existence as an outcome of World War I and World War II:

- Occupied Enemy Territory Administration (OETA), encompassing much of the Middle East during 1917–1920 – separated to French (OETA North) and British (OETA South) domains;
- Allied-occupied Germany (1945–49) in the aftermath of World War II.

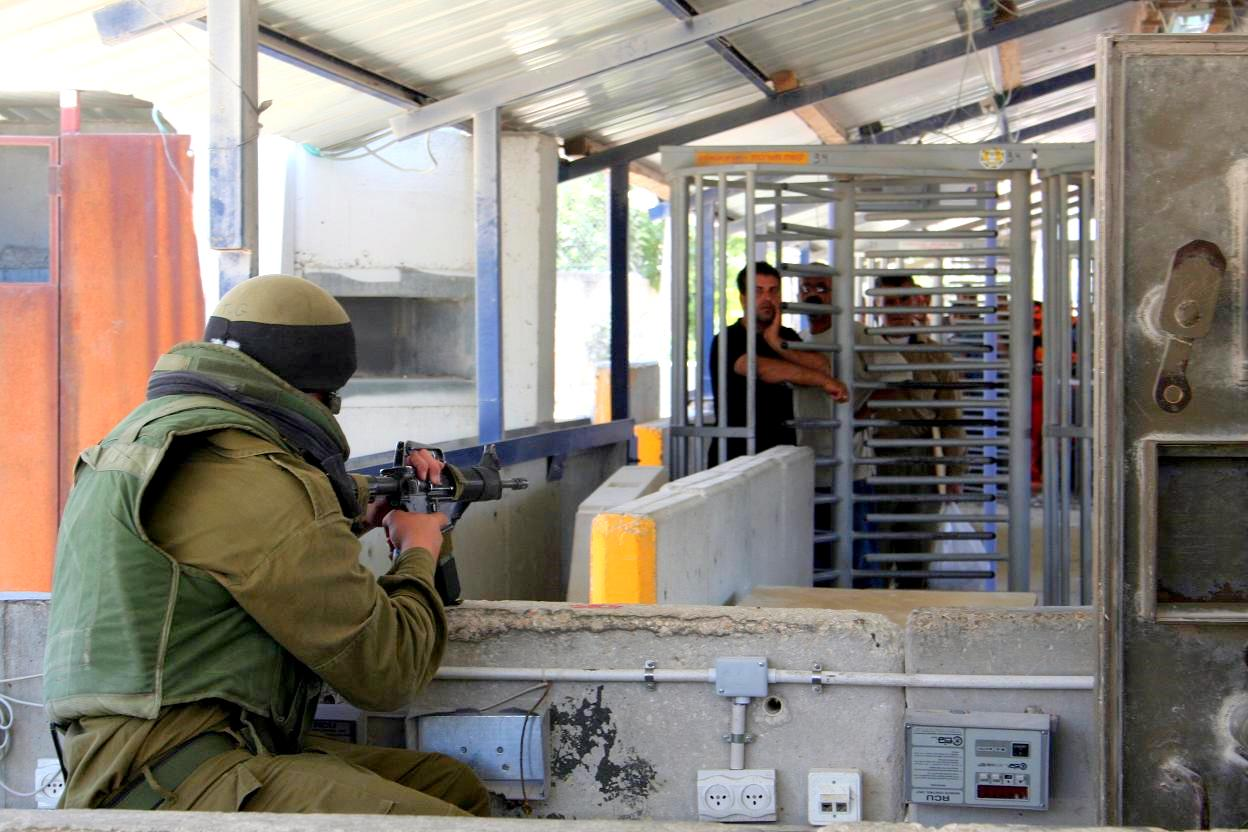
An Israeli soldier managing Palestinians at the Huwara checkpoint in the occupied West Bank, 2006

A number of post-1945 occupations have lasted more than 20 years, such as those of Namibia by South Africa, of East Timor by Indonesia, of Northern Cyprus by Turkey and of Western Sahara by Morocco. One of the world's longest occupations is Israel's occupation of the West Bank, including East Jerusalem and the Gaza Strip (1967-Present), both Palestinian territories, as well as the Syrian Golan Heights, which was occupied in 1967 and effectively annexed in 1981.

Other prolonged occupations that have been alleged include those of the Falkland Islands/Malvinas, disputed between Argentina and the UK (by the UK, since 1833); of Tibet (by PR China, since 1950); and of Hawaii (by the US, since 1893). (Note: The War Report makes no determination as to whether belligerent occupation is occurring in these cases.)

Examples of occupation which took place in the second half of the 20th century include:

- Egyptian occupation of Gaza, 1949/59–1967
- Indian occupation of Goa, followed by its annexation (1961)
- Indonesian occupation of the West New Guinea, followed by its annexation (1963)
- Israeli occupation of the Western Golan Heights (1967–present)
- Turkish occupation of Northern Cyprus (1974–present)
- Ethiopian occupation of Eritrea (1961/62–1991), including its annexation as the Eritrea Province (1962) prior to formal independence (1993)
- Indonesian occupation of East Timor, followed by annexation (1975–1999)
- Moroccan occupation of Western Sahara, followed most areas by its annexation (1975)
- Iraqi occupation of Kuwait, followed by its annexation as the Kuwait Governorate and the Saddamiyat al-Mitla' District during the Gulf War (1990–1991)

Examples of occupation in the 21st century include:

- Iraq occupied by US during the Iraq War of 2003–2011 (See: Coalition Provisional Authority)
- Ethiopian occupation of Somalia (2006–2009), following an intervention at the invitation of the Transitional Federal Government of Somalia
- The Russian occupation of Georgia since 1992/2008 (See: Gori and Poti occupied by Russia during the Russo-Georgian War)
- Russian occupation of Ukraine during the Russo-Ukrainian War (2014–present):
  - Occupation of parts of Donbas region and Crimea in Ukraine by Russia since 2014, followed by its Crimea annexation in 2014 (See: Russian military intervention in Ukraine, War in Donbas)
  - Occupations during the Russian invasion of Ukraine (2022–present):
    - Parts of Kharkiv, Kherson, Zaporizhzhia and Mykolaiv oblasts, followed by partial annexation of occupied areas
    - Former partial occupations of Chernihiv, Dnipropetrovsk, Poltava, Kyiv, Sumy and Zhytomyr oblasts, as well as Snake Island, in early 2022 (See: Timeline of the Russian invasion of Ukraine (24 February – 7 April 2022), Snake Island campaign)
- Turkish occupation of northern Syria in support of the Syrian opposition since 2016
- United Arab Emirates takeover of Socotra in 2018 during the Yemeni Civil War

== See also ==
- Banana Wars
- Allied-occupied Germany
- Ex parte Milligan (Landmark US law)
- German-occupied Europe
- Intervention (international law)
- Interventionism (politics)
- Police action
- Rule of Law in Armed Conflicts Project
- Status of forces agreement
- List of countries with overseas military bases
- Lists of military installations
- List of military occupations
