= Foreign nationals held by Iraq during the 1990–1991 Gulf crisis =

- Date: August 1990 – January 1991
- Location: Iraq, Kuwait

In the wake of its invasion of Kuwait in early August 1990, Iraq took hundreds of foreign nationals—primarily Americans and citizens of other countries—as hostages, holding them in Kuwait and Iraq for several months. It subsequently declared Kuwait its 19th province and ordered more than 60 diplomatic missions in Kuwait to close by 24 August and relocate their personnel to Baghdad. By 15 September, approximately 40 countries had complied with the Iraqi directive, though most lodged formal protests. The hostages were used as a form of leverage to deter potential military action against Iraq. During this period, a range of diplomatic, political, and humanitarian efforts were undertaken to secure their release.

The United Nations Security Council addressed the matter through Resolution 664, adopted on 18 August. In this resolution, the Council expressed its deep concern regarding the treatment of third-state nationals in Iraq and Kuwait. It reaffirmed Iraq’s obligations in this regard under international law and called upon the Iraqi government to permit and facilitate the departure of third-state nationals from both Kuwait and Iraq. Furthermore, it demanded that immediate and uninterrupted access be granted to consular officials for these individuals.

On 15 September 1990, Iraqi soldiers raided the residence of the French ambassador, detaining the military attaché and three civilians, who were taken to an unknown location. The attaché was later released, but the fate of the civilians remained unclear. France had been a major supplier to Iraq during the 1980–1988 war with Iran. In response to the incident, Iraq’s ambassador to Paris, Abdul Razak al-Hashimi, was summoned to provide clarification. He stated that there was no longer a government in Kuwait and that "there is no such state as the State of Kuwait." As a result, he argued, the 1961 Vienna Convention on Diplomatic Relations no longer applied, and those present could no longer be considered diplomats, as embassies in Kuwait were no longer recognized.

On 7 December 1990, President Saddam Hussein agreed to allow all foreign nationals, including 2,000 Westerners, to leave Iraq. On 9 December, a plane carrying 23 American hostages and one British hostage departed on a special chartered flight organized by former U.S. Secretary of Commerce John Connally and Oscar Wyatt, chairman of Coastal Corporation, a company that had previously been a major importer of Iraqi crude oil.

== Aftermath ==
In June 2024, passengers and crew of a British Airways flight filed a lawsuit against the UK government and the airline, alleging “the deliberate endangerment of civilians,” according to the law firm representing them. The claimants suffered significant physical and psychological harm during the ordeal, with lasting effects still felt today, the law firm added. The lawsuit claims that both the government and the airline were aware that the invasion had begun, yet allowed the flight to land regardless. It further alleges that the flight was used to insert a covert special operations team into occupied Kuwait.
