= Alaa Hussein Ali =

Head of Kuwait's puppet government during Iraqi invasion

Ala'a Hussein Ali Jaber Al-Khafaji
- علاء حسين علي جبر الخفاجي
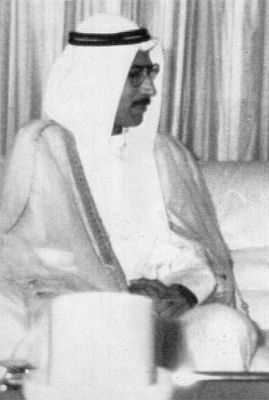
- Ali in 1990

Prime Minister of Kuwait
- In office 4 August 1990 – 28 August 1990
- Preceded by: Saad Al-Salim Al-Sabah
- Succeeded by: Ali Hassan al-Majid (as Governor of Kuwait); Saad Al-Salim Al-Sabah

Deputy Prime Minister of Iraq
- In office 1990–1991
- President: Saddam Hussein
- Prime Minister: Saddam Hussein

Personal details
- Born: 1958 (age 67–68) Kuwait City, Sheikhdom of Kuwait
- Party: Ba'ath
- Profession: Military officer

Military service
- Allegiance: Kuwait (1976–1990); Iraq (1990–2000)
- Rank: (Kuwait) Second lieutenant (Ba'athist Iraq) Colonel

Ala'a Hussein Ali Al-Khafaji (Note: Arabic: علاء حسين علي جبر الخفاجي) (born 1958) is a Kuwaiti-born Iraqi military officer who served as the leader of the Republic of Kuwait, a brief puppet government in Kuwait after the Iraqi invasion of Kuwait in August 1990.

== Political career ==
Al-Khafaji held dual nationalities as an Iraqi and Kuwaiti, having grown up in Kuwait and studied in Baghdad where he became a member of the ruling Ba'ath Party. He held the rank of second lieutenant in the Kuwaiti army prior to the invasion, during the invasion however, Al-Khafaji was promoted to colonel in Baghdad and placed at the head of a 9-member puppet government. On August 9, 1990, Kuwait was annexed by Iraq and Al-Khafaji became the Iraqi Deputy Prime Minister.

== Trial and imprisonment ==
In 1993, Al-Khafaji was sentenced in absentia to death by hanging for treason by the Kuwaiti government. In January 2000 he returned to Kuwait after having fled to Norway to attempt to appeal the sentence. The court however, affirmed his conviction on May 3, 2000. In March 2001, his sentence was commuted by the court of cassation to life in prison instead due to his voluntary return.

In September 2024, the Kuwaiti government revoked Al-Khafaji's Kuwaiti citizenship on grounds of high treason.
