= Mohammed Oreibi Al-Khalifa =

Iraqi judge (1969–2021)

Personal details
- Born: 27 October 1969 Karrada ,Baghdad, Iraq
- Died: 2 April 2021 (aged 51) Baghdad, Iraq
- Cause of death: COVID-19
- Occupation: Judge

Mohammed Oreibi Al-Khalifa (27 October 1969 – 2 April 2021) was chief judge of the Iraqi Special Tribunal's Al-Anfal trial.

== Career ==
Oreibi graduated from the Faculty Law of Baghdad University in 1992 and was appointed a judge in 2000 by a presidential decree.

He was named as judge in the Saddam trial in August 2004.

== Saddam trial ==
During the sectarian war in 2006, his brother in law was shot dead.

== Death ==
He died on 2 April 2021, at a hospital in Baghdad after contracting COVID-19.
