= Republic of Kuwait =

Iraqi puppet state during the Gulf War (1990)

Republic of Kuwait جمهورية الكويت Jumhūrīyat al-Kuwait
- 1990
- Flag

- Status: Puppet state of Ba'athist Iraq
- Capital: Kuwait City
- Common languages: Arabic
- Government: Unitary Ba'athist republic under a provisional government
- Prime Minister
  - 1990: Alaa Hussein Ali
  - 1990: Vacant (De jure); Ali Hassan al-Majid (De facto)
- Historical era: Arab Cold War; Gulf War
  - Established: 2 August 1990
  - Annexed by Ba'athist Iraq: 28 August 1990
Preceded by	Succeeded by
Kuwait	Kuwait Governorate; Saddamiyat al-Mitla' District

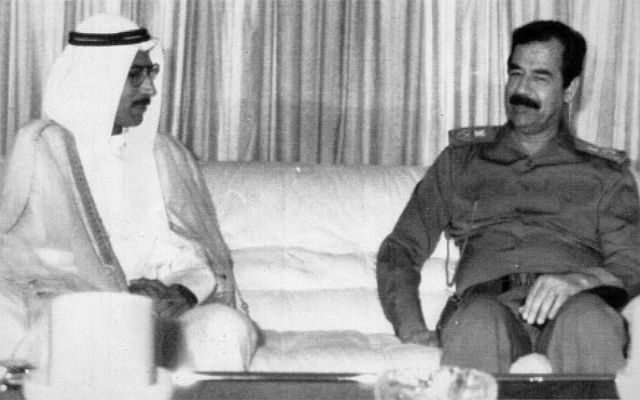
Republic of Kuwait's Prime Minister Alaa Hussein Ali with Iraqi President Saddam Hussein in 1990.

Ba'athist Kuwait, officially the Republic of Kuwait, was a short-lived Ba'athist rival puppet state formed in the aftermath of the invasion of Kuwait by Ba'athist Iraq during the early stages of the Gulf War. During the invasion, the Iraqi Revolutionary Command Council stated that it had sent troops into the State of Kuwait to assist an internal coup d'état initiated by "Kuwaiti revolutionaries." A Provisional Government of Free Kuwait was set up on 4 August 1990 by the Iraqi authorities under the leadership of nine allegedly-Kuwaiti military officers (four colonels and five majors) led by Alaa Hussein Ali, who was given the posts of prime minister (Rais al-Wuzara), commander-in-chief, minister of defense and minister of the interior.

The new regime deposed the Emir Jaber Al-Ahmad Al-Jaber Al-Sabah (who fled Kuwait and established a government in exile based in Saudi Arabia) and accused the House of Sabah of pursuing anti-popular, anti-democratic, pro-imperialist, and Zionist policies along with the "embezzlement of national resources for the purpose of personal enrichment". An indigenous Popular Army to allegedly take over from Iraqi troops was immediately proclaimed, claiming 100,000 volunteers.

Citizenship rights were conferred to non-Kuwaiti Arabs who had come for work from abroad under the monarchy. The newspaper of the regime was known as Al-Nida, named after the "Day of the Call" that was proclaimed on 2 August 1990 to "commemorate" the Iraqi "response" to the alleged calls of the Kuwaitis for Iraq's assistance in overthrowing the monarchy.

== History ==
Walid Saud Abdullah, placed in charge of foreign affairs, achieved some notoriety for the provisional regime when, on 5 August 1990, he stated that "countries that resort to punitive measures against the provisional free Kuwait government... should remember that they have interests and nationals in Kuwait... If these countries insist on aggression against Kuwait and Iraq, the Kuwaiti government will then reconsider the method of dealing with these countries." Saddam's half-brother, Sabawi Ibrahim al-Tikriti of the Iraqi Intelligence Service, was sent on 4 August to establish a security system similar to Iraq's own.

The regime and the Iraqi Government failed in attempts to persuade Kuwaiti opposition groups to partake in the new puppet government and instead threw their support behind the monarchy. Iraq initially claimed that its presence in Kuwait would be limited to helping to foster "a new era of freedom, democracy, justice, and real prosperity in the society" and promised to leave Kuwait once the provisional regime deemed its internal security situation secure which was estimated to take only weeks. International condemnation of Iraq's invasion and a lack of support for the new regime amongst the Kuwaiti citizenry quickly rendered it nonviable.

On 7 August the "Provisional Government of Free Kuwait" proclaimed itself as a republic, with Hussein Ali as its prime minister. A day later, the Iraqi government declared a "merger" of Iraq and Kuwait, based on historical claims. The Iraqi Revolutionary Command Council released a statement stating, "The free provisional Kuwaiti government has decided to appeal to kinsfolk in Iraq, led by the knight of Arabs and the leader of their march, President Field Marshal Saddam Hussein, to agree that their sons should return to their large family, that Kuwait should return to the great Iraq—the mother homeland—and to achieve complete merger unity between Kuwait and Iraq."

Hussein Ali was then made Deputy Prime Minister of Iraq while Ali Hassan al-Majid was proclaimed governor. The Turkish daily Milliyet reported Hussein in September 1990 saying to Bülent Ecevit, "Kuwait is now ours, but we might have refrained from taking such a decision if U.S. troops were not massed in the region with the threat of invading us." He also said on the short-lived provisional regime that had the US not opposed Iraq, Iraq "would have attempted to develop the status of the temporary revolutionary administration.... We would not have been able to ask our people and the armed forces to fight to the last drop of blood if we had not said that Kuwait was not part of Iraq. We would not have been able to prepare our people for the possibility of war."

On 28 August 1990, the Kuwaiti territory was divided into the Kuwait Governorate, Iraq's 19th province (southern part), and the Saddamiyat al-Mitla' District of Basra Governorate (northern part), and thus it was formally annexed. Iraq's refusal to withdraw from Kuwait led to the Gulf War, and on 26 February 1991, the pre-occupation government was returned to power.

== Cabinet ==
Members of the cabinet were as follows:

- Prime Minister, Defense Minister and acting Interior Minister: Col. Ala'a Hussein Ali al-Khafaji al-Jaber
- Minister of Foreign Affairs: Lt. Col. Walid Sa'ud Muhammad Abdullah
- Minister of Oil and acting Finance Minister: Lt. Col. Fu'ad Hussein Ahmad
- Minister of Information and acting Transport Minister: Maj. Fadil Haydar al-Wafiqi
- Minister of Public Health and Housing: Maj. Mish'al Sa'd al-Hadab
- Minister of Social Affairs and acting Works and Labour Minister: Lt. Col. Hussein Ali Duhayman al-Shammari
- Minister of Education and acting Minister of Higher Education: Maj. Nasir Mansur al-Mandil
- Minister of Justice and Legal Affairs and acting minister of Awqaf and Islamic Affairs: Maj. Isam Abd al-Majid Hussein
- Minister of Trade, Electricity and Planning: Maj. Ya'qub Muhammad Shallal

== See also ==
- Kuwaiti Government in exile
- Kuwait–Iraq barrier
- History of Kuwait
