= Rationale for the Gulf War =

Iraqi claims and arguments for invading Kuwait

The Gulf War began on the 2 August 1990, when Iraq invaded Kuwait. The war was fought between an international coalition, led by the United States of America, and Iraq. Saddam Hussein's rationale behind the invasion is disputed and largely unknown. No Iraqi document has ever been discovered explicitly listing these.

== Prelude ==
On the 25 April 1990, CENTCOM warned of a regional threat and subsequently increased intelligence. On the 21 July, the Iraqi army began to build up on the Iraq-Kuwait border with 3,000 vehicles. On the 24 of July, Iraq started upgrading air defenses. The National Intelligence Agency (NIA) said that Iraq had enough forces to conduct military operations in Kuwait. On the 24 July, U.S. Assistant Secretary of State for Public Affairs, Margaret Tutwiler, told journalists, "We do not have any defense treaties with Kuwait, and there are no special defense or security commitments to Kuwait." On the 25 July, Saddam Hussein held a meeting with American diplomat April Glaspie. During the interview, April said, "we have no opinion on the Arab-Arab conflicts, like your border disagreement with Kuwait" and "we should express no opinion on this issue and that the issue is not associated with America." Some historians believe that these comments represented an unwitting green light of Iraq's invasion of Kuwait. In response to these accusations, April said, "Obviously, I didn't think, and nobody else did, that the Iraqis were going to take ALL of Kuwait." Under testimony, she said, "we foolishly did not realize he was stupid, that he did not believe our clear and repeated warnings that we would support our vital interests." By the 31 July, 80,000 soldiers and 20,000 support forces were ready to invade Kuwait. On the 1 August, Richard N. Haas told Brent Scowcroft that an invasion was imminent. On the 2 August 1990, Iraq invaded Kuwait marking the beginning of the Persian Gulf war.

== Possible causes ==
There have been many speculated causes for the start of the war.

=== Economics ===
The casus belli of the invasion was likely the dire economic situation Iraq was positioned with in 1990. In January 1979, the Iranian Shah monarchy was overthrown and replaced by the supreme leader, Ruhollah Khomeini. To prevent the spread of Iranian Islamic extremism and other hegemonic claims of the Shatt Al Arab waterway, Iraq invaded Iran on the 22 September 1980. The Iran–Iraq War was a devastating conflict that killed more than one million individuals. The war resulted in the Iraqi army becoming the fourth biggest in the world but also devastated its economy. Iraq owed $35 billion in short-time high interest loans and the cost of infrastructure damage amounted to over $230 billion. In February 1989, Iraq established the Arab Cooperation Council which attempted to garner economic support. In 1989, Iraq provided financial aid to Jordan by providing free shipping. In 1989, Saddam accused Kuwait of oil slant drilling under Rumaila oil field on the Iraqi border. In February 1990, Saddam Hussein believed that Iraq should be compensated for protecting the Middle East from the spread of radicalism. He suggested that Kuwait, Saudi Arabia, and the United Arab Emirates (UAE) should write off Iraq's wartime loans. Kuwait and UAE did write off some of their loans. Saddam also hinted at his idea to invade Kuwait by saying, "Let the Gulf regimes know...that if they will not give this money to me, I will know how to get it." On the 18th July 1990, Saddam accused Kuwait and the UAE of exceeding Oil and Petroleum Exporting Countries (OPEC) quotas and requested that they lower their production. Iraqi Foreign Minister Tariq Aziz said, "every $1 drop in the price of a barrel of oil caused a $1 billion drop in Iraq's annual revenues." It is estimated that Iraq lost $14 billion as a result of Kuwaiti overproduction. These factors resulted in Iraq's terrible economy. The invasion meant that Iraq owned 20% of OPEC.

=== Iraq and Kuwait's border dispute ===
The Kuwaiti entity dates back to 1716 but maps as early as 1652 have outlined Kuwait's existence. Kuwaiti sovereignty and independence predates Iraq by more than 200 years. On the 23 July 1923, the treaty of Lausanne established the new borders after the collapse of the Ottoman Empire. This resulted in British exerting control of the Mandate of Mesopotamia and Palestine. The borders were arbitrary and served the interests of the British Empire and France. On the 3 October 1932, Iraq was given Independence and on the 14 July 1958, the Iraqi monarchy was replaced with a republic. In 1963, Iraq recognized Kuwait's borders and independence. Later, Saddam Hussein claimed that this was invalid as it was not ratified. He also suggested that Kuwait had been carved out of the Iraq by the United Nations.

The only geographical barrier between Iraq and Kuwait is the Arabian desert. No fence existed until 1992 to prevent a possible re-invasion.

=== Strategic importance ===
Kuwait is a highly strategic location. Kuwait lies on the delta of the Persian Gulf and has a coastal length of approximately 290 km. In contrast, Iraq is largely landlocked with a coastal length of only 60 km. Furthermore, Iraq has one major port, Umm Qasr through the Kuwaiti controlled Khor Abdullah waterway. As a result, Iraq's economical growth has been slowed due a lack of trading opportunities. Furthermore, the Khor Abudallah waterway is prone to crowding and was blocked by Iran during the Iran-Iraq war. Iraq also has a small navy and lacks a strong grip on the Persian Gulf. Iraq failed to gain a lease on the strategically vital islands of Bubiyan, Warbah, and Failak. Kuwait also allowed Iraq's modified Al Hussein SCUD missiles to reach Qatar and Bahrain.

Kuwait is one of the richest countries in the world. As of 2017, Kuwait has the 15th largest GDP per capita of US$66,200. In 1990, Kuwait had the most modern water treatment facilities in the Middle East. The invasion gave Iraq access to these riches.

=== Other ===
Some minor factors include Kuwait's negligence and limited defense especially since they were surrounded by several larger players. Furthermore, most Kuwaiti soldiers were on holidays and those who remained lacked adequate training, equipment, and morale. Finally, Saddam also had a long-standing dream to establish a greater Arab Empire and unite fellow Arabs. The invasion of Kuwait may have been a stepping stone to achieve this ideal.

== Reasons for American intervention ==
=== International context ===
Between 1989 and 1990, the Soviet Union suffered from numerous revolutions in Poland, Hungary, Bulgaria, Czechoslovakia, Romania, and East Germany. This meant that the Soviet Union began to decay and by the 25 December 1991, the Soviet Union ceased to exist. During this time, international dynamics gradually switched from bipolarity to unipolarity with the US at the forefront of global affairs. It was a double-edged sword. The USA had a greater range to their influence but meant that "relatively small, peripheral and backward states will be able to emerge rapidly as threats not only to regional, but to world, security." These states would not be influenced by multiple superpowers and thus, would not be used as a proxy war.

The international context was crucial for Saddam's decision to invade in Kuwait and international condemnation. The USA's decision to intervene was a signal to other nations that aggression would not go unchallenged. Secretary of State, Lawrence Eagleburger said, "If he succeeds, others may try the same thing." Former British prime minister, Margaret Thatcher, suggested that the intervention comforted other small states and safeguarded democracy.

=== US Foreign Policy ===
After World War Two, the USA followed a policy of non-involvement in the Middle East. On the 23 January 1980, the Carter administration established the USA's official foreign policy regarding the Middle East as:

"Let our position be absolutely clear: An attempt by any outside force to gain control of the Persian Gulf region will be regarded as an assault on the vital interests of the United States of America, and such an assault will be repelled by any means necessary, including military force."

Ronald Reagan's rollback doctrine also had implications in the Middle East because the Soviet Union was involved in Iraq, Iran, and Afghanistan. "Our mission is to nourish and defend freedom of democracy. On every continent."
