= Kuwait Governorate =

Iraqi governorate within occupied Kuwaiti territory (1990–1991)

Coordinates: 29°30′N 45°45′E

Kuwait Governorate محافظة الكويت (Arabic)
- Annexed territory under military occupation
- 1990–1991
- Flag of the Iraqi Republic

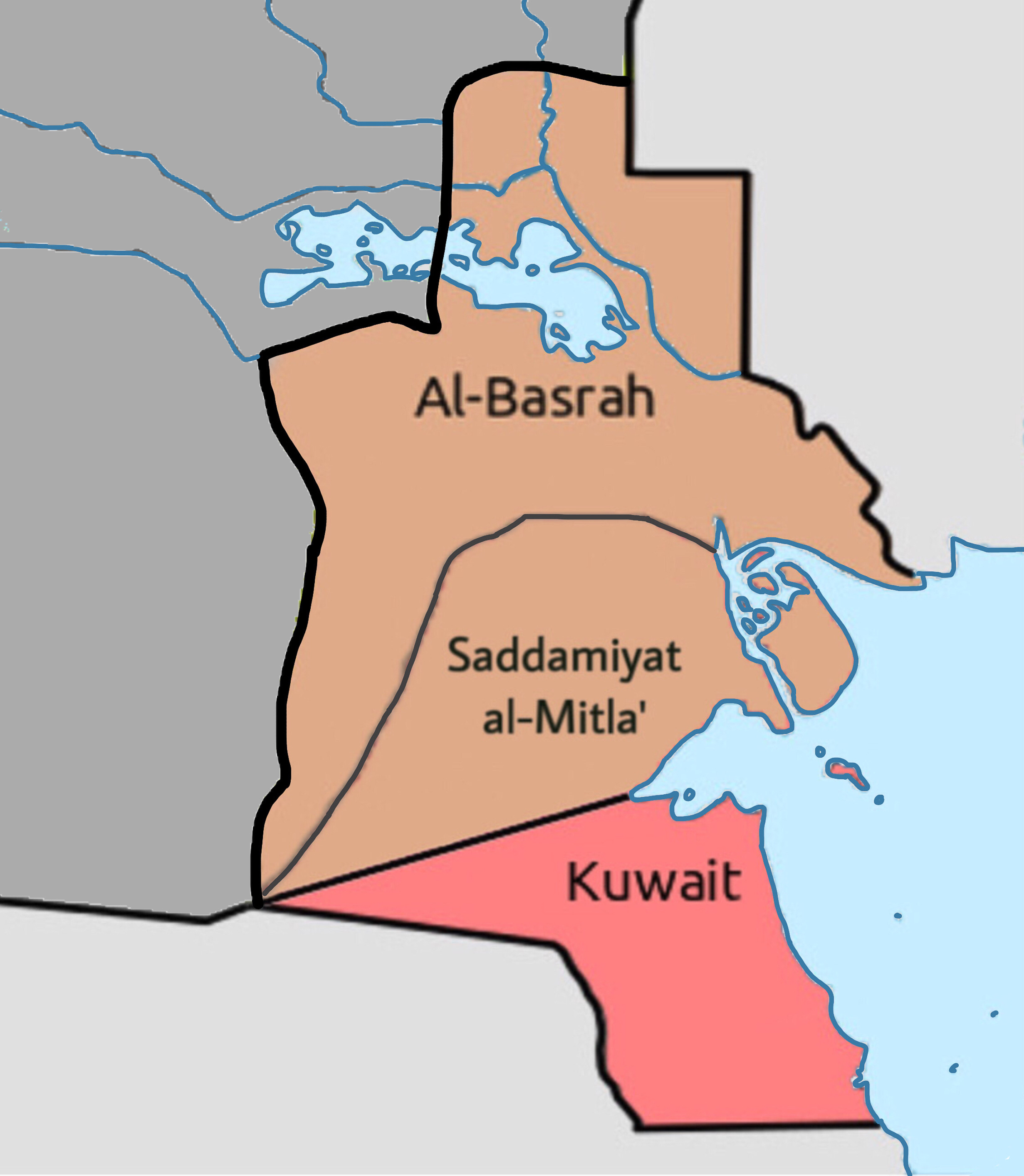
- Kuwait Governorate in red
- Capital: Kuwait
  - Type: Governorate of Iraq (de jure); Military occupation (de facto)
- Historical era: Gulf War
  - Republic of Kuwait annexed by Iraq: 28 August 1990
  - Liberation of Kuwait: 28 February 1991
Preceded by	Succeeded by
Republic of Kuwait	State of Kuwait

The Kuwait Governorate (Arabic: محافظة الكويت) was the 19th governorate of Iraq established in the aftermath of the invasion of Kuwait by Iraq in 1990. It was preceded by the brief puppet state of the Republic of Kuwait. The Kuwait Governorate consisted of most of the occupied Kuwaiti territory, with the exclusion of the northern areas which became the Saddamiyat al-Mitla' District. Saddam Hussein's relative, Ali Hassan al-Majid, became the governor of this province.
