= Iraqi invasion of Kuwait =

Beginning of the 1990–1991 Gulf War

- Part of the Gulf War
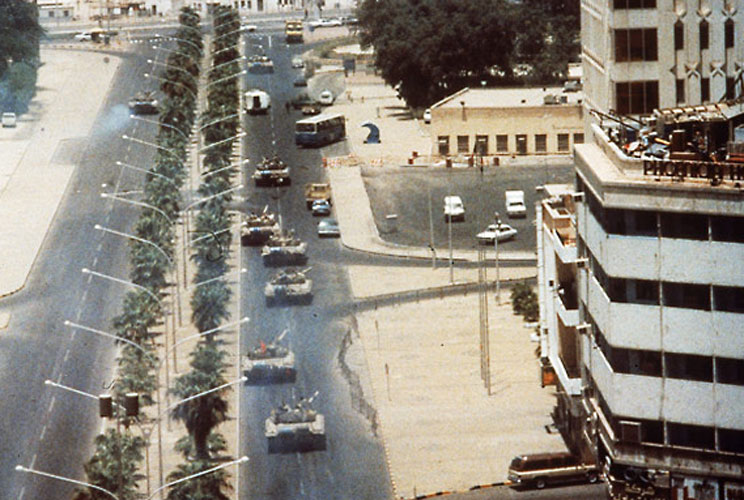
- Iraqi T-72 tanks in Kuwait City
Date	2–4 August 1990 (2 days)
Location	Kuwait
Result	Iraqi victory
Territorial changes	Iraq establishes the Republic of Kuwait on 2 August and annexes it on 28 August; Northern Kuwait becomes the Saddamiyat al-Mitla' District within Iraq's Basra Governorate; Southern Kuwait becomes Iraq's Kuwait Governorate

Belligerents
Iraq	Kuwait

Commanders and leaders
Saddam Hussein; Ra'ad al-Hamdani; Tariq Aziz; Ali Hassan al-Majid; Izzat Ibrahim al-Douri; Hussein Kamel al-Majid	Jaber III; Saad I; Sabah IV; Fahad IV †

Units involved
Iraqi Armed Forces; Iraqi Army; Republican Guard; Iraqi Air Force; Iraqi Navy	Kuwait Armed Forces; Kuwait Army; Kuwait Air Force; Kuwait Naval Force; Kuwait National Guard

Strength
88,000 men	20,000 men; 16,000 (Army); 2,200 (Air Force); 1,800 (Navy)

Casualties and losses
295 killed; 361 wounded (unconfirmed Kuwaiti claims); 120 tanks and AFVs destroyed; 4 ships sunk (unconfirmed Kuwaiti claims)	420 killed; 12,000 captured; c. 250 tanks destroyed/captured; 850+ AFVs destroyed/captured; 57 aircraft destroyed; 8+ Mirage F1s captured; 17 ships sunk; 6 ships captured; 24 I-Hawk SAMs destroyed/captured; 36 M109 155mm destroyed/captured; 20–80 AMX-F3 155mm SPHs destroyed/captured

The Iraqi invasion of Kuwait, codenamed Project 17, began on 2 August 1990 and marked the beginning of the Gulf War. After defeating the State of Kuwait on 4 August 1990, Iraq went on to militarily occupy the country for the next seven months. The invasion was condemned internationally, and the United Nations Security Council (UNSC) adopted numerous resolutions urging Iraq to withdraw from Kuwaiti territory. The Iraqi military, however, continued to occupy Kuwait and defied all orders by the UNSC. After initially establishing the "Republic of Kuwait" as a puppet state, Iraq annexed the entire country on 28 August 1990; northern Kuwait became the Saddamiyat al-Mitla' District and was merged into the existing Basra Governorate, while southern Kuwait was carved out as the all-new Kuwait Governorate. By November 1990, the adoption of UNSC Resolution 678 officially issued Iraq an ultimatum to withdraw unconditionally by 15 January 1991 or else be removed by "all necessary means" from Kuwaiti territory. In anticipation of a war with Iraq, the UNSC authorized the assembly of an American-led military coalition.

After Iraq failed to meet the UNSC's deadline, the coalition pursued the directive to forcefully expel Iraqi troops from Kuwait by initiating the Gulf War aerial bombardment campaign on 17 January 1991. As the bombardment campaign continued over the next month, Iraq fired missiles at Israel; the Iraqi government had hoped that an Israeli retaliation would prompt the coalition's Muslim-majority states to rescind their support for the campaign against Iraq. However, no such retaliation took place, and the coalition began a ground invasion of Iraqi-occupied Kuwait and parts of Iraq on 23 February 1991. As Iraqi troops retreated from Kuwait, they set fire to over 700 Kuwaiti oil wells, but this strategy was ultimately unsuccessful in thwarting the coalition's advance. By 28 February 1991, the Iraqi military had been devastated and Kuwaiti independence was restored.

Though the true intent behind Iraq's decision to attack Kuwait is disputed, a variety of speculations have been made. One possible motive concerned Iraq's inability to repay the US$14 billion that it had borrowed from Kuwait during the Iran–Iraq War. Proponents of this theory point to Kuwait's surge in petroleum production, which kept Iraq's revenues down; Kuwait's oil production levels were above the mandatory quota that was specified by the Organization of the Petroleum Exporting Countries (OPEC), which had consequently urged the country to moderate production amidst a sharp decrease in global oil prices. Iraq interpreted the Kuwaiti government's refusal to decrease oil production as an act of aggression against the Iraqi economy. In early 1990, Iraq accused Kuwait of slant drilling to steal Iraqi petroleum across the Iraq–Kuwait border, though some Iraqi sources indicated that Saddam Hussein had already made the decision to attack Kuwait a few months before the actual invasion. Within two days of the invasion, most Kuwaiti military units had been overrun by the Iraqis and most Kuwaiti officials had gone into exile in Saudi Arabia and Bahrain.

== Background ==
=== Iran–Iraq War and Iraqi debt to Kuwait ===
When the Iran–Iraq War broke out, Kuwait initially stayed neutral and also tried mediating between Iran and Iraq. In 1982, Kuwait along with other Arab states of the Persian Gulf supported Iraq to curb the Iranian Revolutionary government. In 1982–1983, Kuwait began extending significant financial loans to Iraq. Kuwait's large-scale economic assistance to Iraq often triggered hostile Iranian actions against Kuwait. Iran repeatedly targeted Kuwaiti oil tankers in 1984 and fired weapons at Kuwaiti security personnel stationed on Bubiyan island in 1988. During the Iran–Iraq War, Kuwait functioned as Iraq's major port once Basra was shut down by the fighting. However, after the war ended, the friendly relations between the two neighbouring Arab countries turned sour for several economic and diplomatic reasons that culminated in an Iraqi invasion of Kuwait.

By the time the Iran–Iraq War ended, Iraq was not in a financial position to repay the US$14 billion it had borrowed from Kuwait to finance its war and requested that Kuwait forgive the debt. Iraq argued that the war had prevented a possible rise of Iranian hegemony over Kuwait. Kuwait's unwillingness to write off the debt strained the relationship between the two countries. In late 1989, several official meetings were held between Kuwaiti and Iraqi leaders, but did not result in an agreement.

=== Kuwaiti economic warfare and alleged slant drilling ===
In 1988, Iraq's Oil Minister, Issam Al-Chalabi, strove for a reduction in the crude oil production quota of Organization of the Petroleum Exporting Countries (OPEC) members to end the 1980s oil glut. Chalabi argued that higher oil prices would help Iraq to pay back its US$60 billion debt by increasing its revenues. However, given its large downstream petroleum industry, Kuwait was less concerned about the prices of crude oil and in 1989, Kuwait requested OPEC to increase the country's total oil production ceiling by 50% to 1.35 million barrels (215,000 m^{3}) per day. Throughout much of the 1980s, Kuwait's oil production had already been considerably above its mandatory OPEC quota and this had prevented a rise of crude oil prices. A lack of consensus among OPEC members undermined Iraq's efforts to end the oil glut and consequently prevented the recovery of its war-crippled economy. According to former Iraqi Foreign Minister Tariq Aziz, "every US$1 drop in the price of a barrel of oil caused a US$1 billion drop in Iraq's annual revenues, triggering an acute financial crisis in Baghdad". Iraq interpreted Kuwait's refusal to decrease its oil production as an act of aggression.

The increasingly tense relations between Iraq and Kuwait were further aggravated when Iraq alleged that Kuwait was slant-drilling across the border into Iraq's Rumaila field. The dispute over the Rumaila field started in 1960 when an Arab League declaration marked the Iraq–Kuwait border 3 kilometres (2 mi) north of the southernmost tip of the Rumaila field. During the Iran–Iraq War, Iraqi oil drilling operations in Rumaila declined while Kuwait's operations increased. In 1989, Iraq accused Kuwait of using "advanced drilling techniques" to exploit oil from its share of the Rumaila field. Iraq estimated that US$2.4 billion worth of Iraqi oil was "stolen" by Kuwait and demanded compensation. According to oil workers in the area, Iraq's slant drilling claim was fabricated, as "oil flows easily from the Rumaila field without any need for these techniques."

On 26 July 1990, only a few days before the Iraqi invasion, OPEC officials said that Kuwait and the United Arab Emirates had agreed to a proposal to limit their oil output to 1.5 million barrels (240,000 m^{3}) per day, "down from the nearly 2 million barrels a day they had each been pumping", thus potentially settling differences over oil policy between Kuwait and Iraq.

=== Iraqi irredentism ===
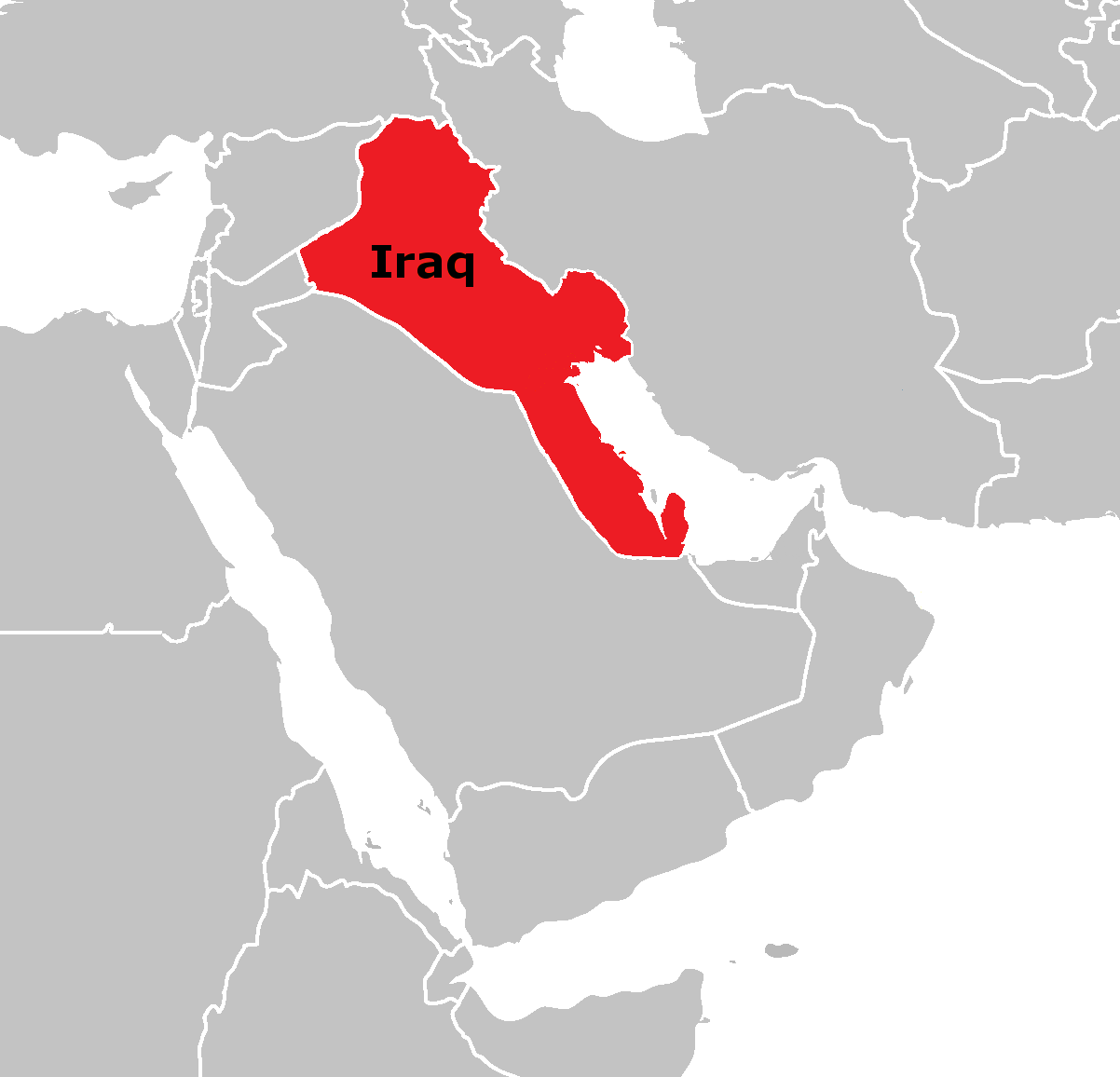
A map illustrating the modern countries and provinces historically encompassed by Iraqi nationalist irredentist rhetoric.

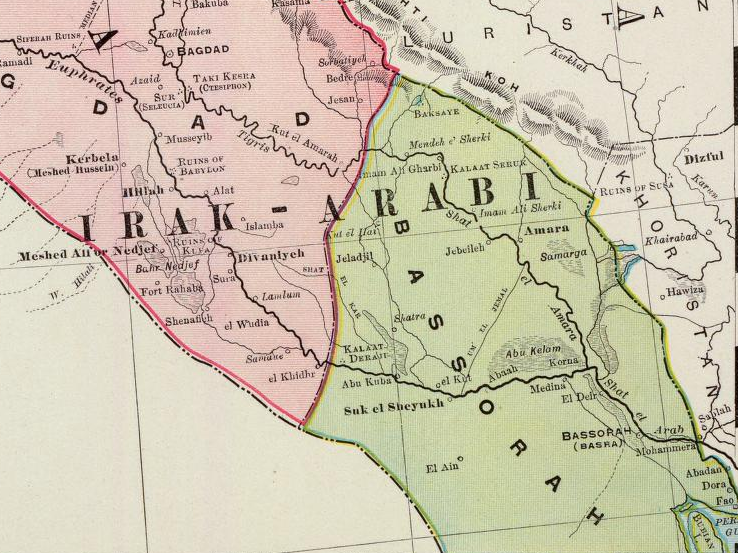
The Basra Vilayet of the Ottoman Empire in 1897. After the Anglo-Ottoman Convention of 1913, Kuwait was established as an autonomous kaza, or district, of the Ottoman Empire and a de facto protectorate of Great Britain.

Iraq had a history of irredentist claims to Kuwait. After gaining independence in 1932, the Kingdom of Iraq immediately declared that the Sheikhdom of Kuwait was rightfully a territory of Iraq, claiming it had been part of an Iraqi territory until being created by the British. The Iraqi Republic under Abd al-Karim Qasim also held irredentist claims to Kuwait.

The Saddam government also believed this and justified the invasion by claiming that Kuwait had always been an integral part of Iraq and only became an independent state due to the interference of the British government. After signing the Anglo-Ottoman Convention of 1913, the British government planned to split Kuwait from the Ottoman territories into a separate sheikhdom, but this agreement was never ratified. The Iraqi government also argued that the Kuwaiti Emir was a highly unpopular figure among the Kuwaiti populace. By overthrowing the Emir, Iraq claimed that it granted Kuwaitis greater economic and political freedom.

Kuwait had been loosely under the authority of the Ottoman vilâyet of Basra, and although its ruling dynasty, the Al Sabah family, had concluded a protectorate agreement in 1899 that assigned responsibility for its foreign affairs to Britain, it did not make any attempt to secede from the Ottoman Empire. For this reason, its borders with the rest of Basra province were never clearly defined or mutually agreed upon.

Following the proclamation of the puppet state, the 'Republic of Kuwait', the Iraqi Revolutionary Command Council released a statement stating, "The free provisional Kuwaiti government has decided to appeal to kinsfolk in Iraq, led by the knight of Arabs and the leader of their march, President Field Marshal Saddam Hussein, to agree that their sons should return to their large family, that Kuwait should return to the great Iraq—the mother homeland—and to achieve complete merger unity between Kuwait and Iraq."

=== Iraq–United States correspondence ===
On 25 July 1990, April Glaspie, the U.S. ambassador to Iraq, asked the Iraqi high command to explain the military preparations in progress, including the massing of Iraqi troops near the border. In turn, Saddam attacked American policy with regard to Kuwait and the United Arab Emirates (UAE):

So what can it mean when America says it will now protect its friends? It can only mean prejudice against Iraq. This stance plus maneuvers and statements which have been made has encouraged the UAE and Kuwait to disregard Iraqi rights. If you use pressure, we will deploy pressure and force. We know that you can harm us although we do not threaten you. But we too can harm you. Everyone can cause harm according to their ability and their size. We cannot come all the way to you in the US, but individual Arabs may reach you. We do not place America among the enemies. We place it where we want our friends to be and we try to be friends. But repeated American statements last year made it apparent that America did not regard us as friends.

Glaspie replied:

I know you need funds. We understand that and our opinion is that you should have the opportunity to rebuild your country. But we have no opinion on the Arab-Arab conflicts, like your border disagreement with Kuwait. ... Frankly, we can only see that you have deployed massive troops in the south. Normally that would not be any of our business. But when this happens in the context of what you said on your national day, then when we read the details in the two letters of the Foreign Minister, then when we see the Iraqi point of view that the measures taken by the UAE and Kuwait is, in the final analysis, parallel to military aggression against Iraq, then it would be reasonable for me to be concerned.

— April Glaspie

The American ambassador declared to her Iraqi interlocutor that Washington, "inspired by the friendship and not by confrontation, does not have an opinion" on the disagreement between Kuwait and Iraq, stating "we have no opinion on the Arab–Arab conflicts". Glaspie also indicated to Saddam Hussein that the United States did not intend "to start an economic war against Iraq". These statements may have caused Saddam to believe he had received a diplomatic green light from the United States to invade Kuwait. Saddam and Glaspie later disputed what was said in this meeting. Saddam published a transcript but Glaspie disputed its accuracy before the Senate Foreign Relations Committee in March 1991.

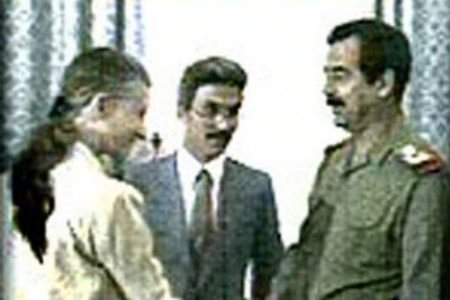
April Glaspie's first meeting with Saddam Hussein

According to Richard E. Rubenstein, when Glaspie was later asked by British journalists why she had said that, her response was "we didn't think he would go that far" meaning invade and annex the whole country. Although no follow-up question was asked, it can be inferred that what the U.S. government thought in July 1990 was that Saddam Hussein was only interested in pressuring Kuwait into debt forgiveness and to lower oil production.

In addition, only a few days before the invasion, the Assistant Secretary of State, John Hubert Kelly, told the U.S. House of Representatives in a public hearing that the United States had no treaty obligations to defend Kuwait. When asked how the U.S. would react if Iraq crossed the border into Kuwait, Kelly answered that it "is a hypothetical or a contingency, the kind of which I can't get into. Suffice it to say we would be concerned, but I cannot get into the realm of 'what if' answers."

However, Saddam's foreign minister Tariq Aziz later told PBS Frontline in 1996 that the Iraqi leadership was under "no illusion" about America's likely response to the Iraqi invasion: "She [Glaspie] didn't tell us anything strange. She didn't tell us in the sense that we concluded that the Americans will not retaliate. That was nonsense you see. It was nonsense to think that the Americans would not attack us." And in a second 2000 interview with the same television program, Aziz said:

There were no mixed signals. We should not forget that the whole period before August 2 witnessed a negative American policy towards Iraq. So it would be quite foolish to think that, if we go to Kuwait, then America would like that. Because the American tendency ... was to untie Iraq. So how could we imagine that such a step was going to be appreciated by the Americans? It looks foolish, you see, this is fiction. About the meeting with April Glaspie—it was a routine meeting...She didn't say anything extraordinary beyond what any professional diplomat would say without previous instructions from his government...what she said were routine, classical comments on what the president was asking her to convey to President Bush. He wanted her to carry a message to George Bush—not to receive a message through her from Washington.

== Invasion ==
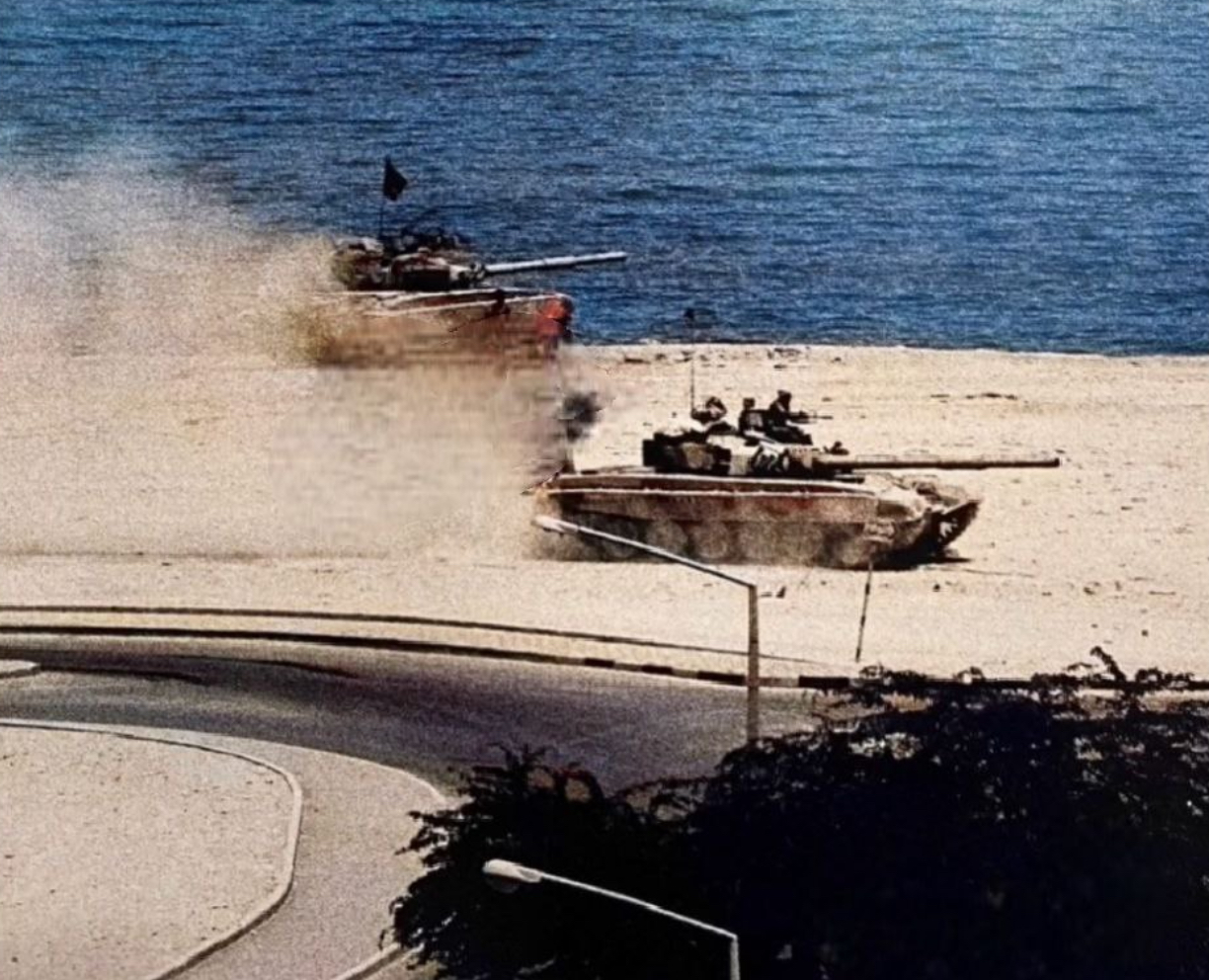
An Iraqi Army T-72 main battle tank firing during the invasion of Kuwait, August 1990. The image depicts an Iraqi T-72 engaging targets along the Kuwaiti coastline during the early stages of the invasion. On 2 August 1990.

On 2 August 1990 at 2:00 am, local time, by Saddam Hussein's order Iraq launched an invasion of Kuwait with four elite Iraqi Republican Guard divisions (the 1st Hammurabi Armoured Division, 2nd al-Medinah al-Munawera Armoured Division, the Tawakalna ala-Allah Division (mechanized infantry) and 4th Nebuchadnezzar Division (motorized infantry) and special forces units equivalent to a full division.

In support of these units, the Iraqi Army deployed a squadron of Mil Mi-25 helicopter gunships, several units of Mil Mi-8 and Mil Mi-17 transport helicopters, as well as a squadron of Bell 412 helicopters. The foremost mission of the helicopter units was to transport and support Iraqi commandos into Kuwait City, and subsequently to support the advance of ground troops. The Iraqi Air Force (IQAF) had at least two squadrons of Sukhoi Su-22, one of Su-25, one of Mirage F1 and two of MiG-23 fighter-bombers. The main task of the IQAF was to establish air superiority through limited air strikes against two main air bases of the Kuwaiti Air Force, whose aircraft consisted mainly of Mirage F1s and Douglas (T)A-4KU Skyhawks.

Despite months of Iraqi sabre-rattling, Kuwait did not have its forces on alert and was caught unaware. The first indication of the Iraqi ground advance was from a radar-equipped aerostat that detected an Iraqi armour column moving south. Kuwaiti air, ground, and naval forces resisted, but were vastly outnumbered. In central Kuwait, the 35th Armoured Brigade deployed approximately a battalion of Chieftain tanks, BMPs, and an artillery battery against the Iraqis and fought delaying actions near Al Jahra (see Battle of the Bridges), west of Kuwait City. In the south, the 15th Armoured Brigade moved immediately to evacuate its forces to Saudi Arabia.

Kuwait Air Force aircraft were scrambled, but approximately 20% were lost or captured. The remaining 80% were then evacuated to Saudi Arabia and Bahrain, some aircraft even taking off from the highways adjacent to the bases as the runways were overrun. While these aircraft were not used in support of the subsequent Gulf War, the "Free Kuwait Air Force" assisted Saudi Arabia in patrolling the southern border with Yemen, which was considered a threat by the Saudi Arabians because of Yemen–Iraq ties.

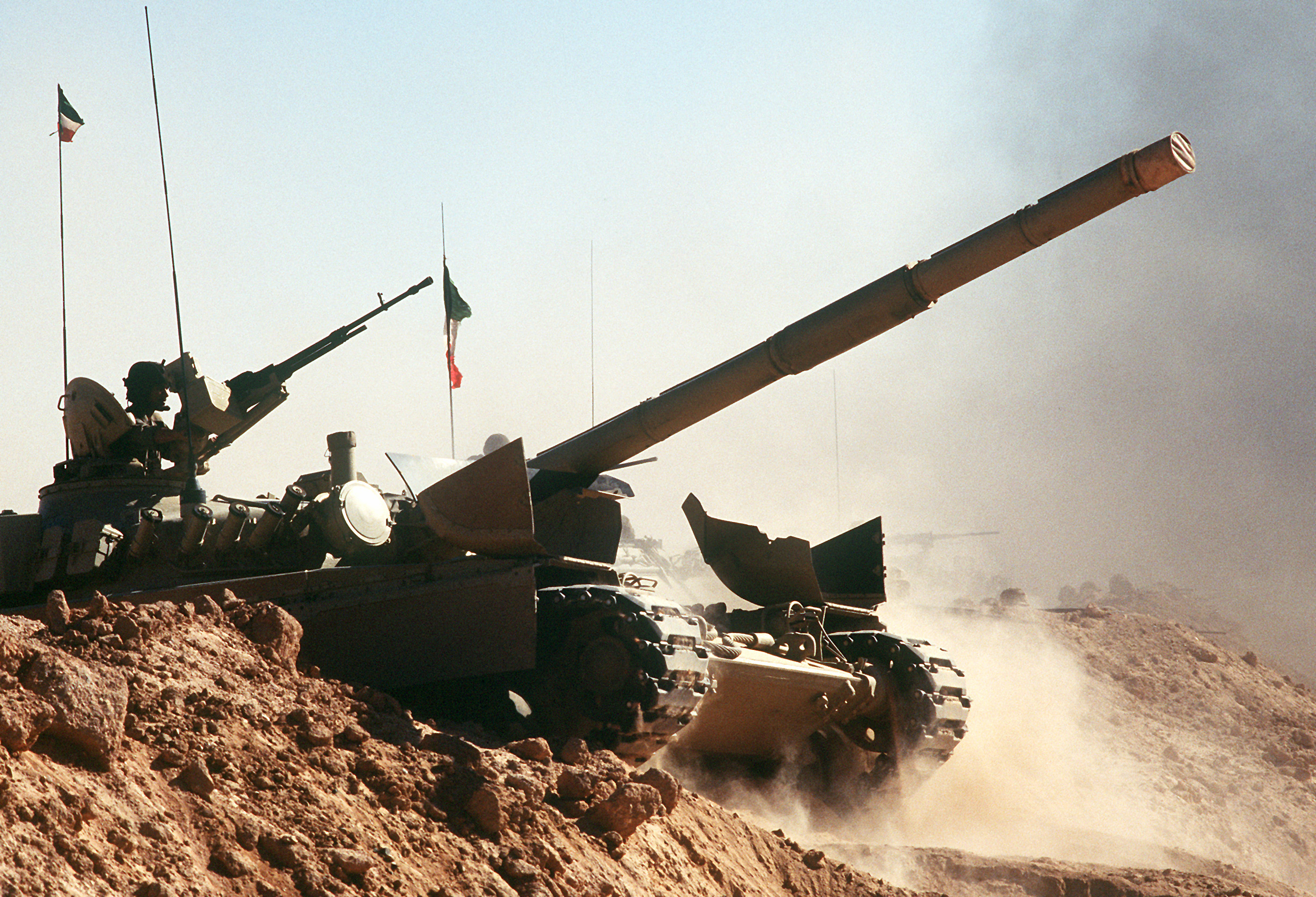
A Kuwaiti M-84 tank during Operation Desert Shield in 1990. Kuwait continues to maintain strong relations with the coalition of the Gulf War.

Iraqi troops attacked Dasman Palace, the Royal Residence, resulting in the Battle of Dasman Palace. The Kuwaiti Emiri Guard, supported by local police and Chieftain tanks and a platoon of Saladin armoured cars managed to repel an airborne assault by Iraqi special forces, but the Palace fell after a landing by Iraqi marines (Dasman Palace is located on the coast). The Kuwaiti National Guard, as well as additional Emiri Guards arrived, but the palace remained occupied, and Republican Guard tanks rolled into Kuwait City after several hours of heavy fighting.

The Emir of Kuwait, Jaber Al-Ahmad Al-Jaber Al-Sabah had already fled into the Saudi Arabian desert. His younger half brother, Sheikh Fahad Al-Ahmed Al-Jaber Al-Sabah, was shot and killed by invading Iraqi forces as he attempted to defend Dasman Palace, after which his body was placed in front of a tank and run over, according to an Iraqi soldier who was present and deserted after the assault.

Towards the end of the first day of the invasion, only pockets of resistance were left in the country. By 3 August, the last military units were desperately fighting delaying actions at choke points and other defensible positions throughout the country until out of ammunition or overrun by Iraqi forces. Ali al-Salem Air Base of the Kuwaiti Air Force was the only base still unoccupied on 3 August, and Kuwaiti aircraft flew resupply missions from Saudi Arabia throughout the day in an effort to mount a defense. However, by nightfall, Ali al-Salem Air Base had been overrun by Iraqi forces.

=== Causes ===
The invasion occurred during a period of comparatively low oil prices, which scholars cite as a primary example of an 'oil gambit'—a conflict fought out of economic desperation. Faced with declining revenues, the Iraqi regime sought to seize Kuwaiti resources to reverse its economic fortunes and gain a greater share of global production to influence market prices unilaterally.

=== Kuwaiti resistance ===
Kuwaitis founded a local armed resistance movement following the Iraqi occupation of Kuwait. Most of the Kuwaitis who were arrested, tortured, and executed during the occupation were civilians. The Kuwaiti resistance's casualty rate far exceeded that of the coalition military forces and Western hostages.

At first, Iraqi forces did not use violent tactics. Iraqi soldiers instructed Kuwaitis to replace their Kuwaiti license plates with Iraqi ones, and also set up an extensive system of security checkpoints to patrol the Kuwaiti population. Within a few weeks of the invasion, however, Kuwaitis began participating in mass actions of nonviolent resistance. People stayed home from work and school en masse. Kuwaitis also began printing informational pamphlets about the invasion from their home computers and printers and distributed the pamphlets to neighbors and friends. After that wave of nonviolent resistance, the Iraqi military turned to repression in order to maintain control over Kuwait.

Pamphlets with anti-war slogans were printed and the resistance provided hiding places and false identification cards for Kuwaitis who were sought by the Iraqi secret police. Resistance cells held secret meetings at mosques. Kuwaiti women like Asrar al-Qabandi, a prominent female resistance leader, was seen as a martyr of the Iraqi invasion. During the occupation she helped people flee to safety, smuggled weapons and money into Kuwait as well as disks from the Ministry of Civil Information to safety, cared for many wounded by the war, and destroyed monitoring devices used by the Iraqi troops. She was captured and subsequently killed by Iraqi troops in January 1991. Other women staged street protests and carried signs with slogans like "Free Kuwait: Stop the Atrocities Now." Iraqi police searched the homes of those suspected of hiding foreigners or covertly smuggling money to the resistance movement. Money that was smuggled to the resistance was often used to bribe Iraqi soldiers to look the other way. Resistance tactics included car bombs and sniper attacks that caused a considerable number of Iraqi casualties.

By August 1990, the resistance movement was receiving support from the U.S. government in the form of intelligence, materials, and other types of covert assistance. Both the CIA and the U.S. Green Berets were involved. The U.S. government, however, would neither confirm nor deny its support of the resistance on record. On the topic of the resistance, President Bush stated, "... in a broad way I support the Kuwaiti underground. I support anybody that can add a hand in restoring legitimacy there to Kuwait and to getting the Iraqis out of Kuwait." Operation Desert Storm, which included U.S. forces, also aided the resistance movement out of its base in Taif, Saudi Arabia.

The Kuwaiti government went into exile in Taif and supported the resistance movement from there. The exiled Kuwaiti government explicitly supported the resistance and commented on its strategies. Although Iraqi forces curtailed almost all forms of communication within and outside the country, the resistance movement managed to smuggle satellite phones across the Saudi Arabian border in order to establish a line of communication with the exiled Kuwaiti government in Taif, Saudi Arabia. Kuwaitis also printed informational pamphlets and distributed them to other citizens. This was especially important because the flow of information was severely restricted in Kuwait during the occupation; radio channels played transmissions from Baghdad and many Kuwaiti TV channels were shut down. A resistance newspaper titled Sumoud al-Sha'ab (Steadfastness of the People) was printed and circulated in secret. Informational pamphlets became one of the only sources of news from the outside world. Foreigners and Kuwaitis of different genders and classes participated in the resistance, breaking down Kuwait's traditional social barriers.

==== Iraqi crackdown ====
In October 1990, Iraqi officials cracked down on the resistance by executing hundreds of people it suspected were involved in the movement as well as conducting raids and searches of individual households. After the crackdown, the resistance began to target Iraqi military bases in order to reduce retaliation against Kuwaiti civilians. In October 1990, the Iraqi government opened the borders of Kuwait and allowed anyone to exit. This resulted in an exodus of both Kuwaitis and foreigners, which weakened the resistance movement.

Ground troop movements, 24–28 February 1991, during Operation Desert Storm.

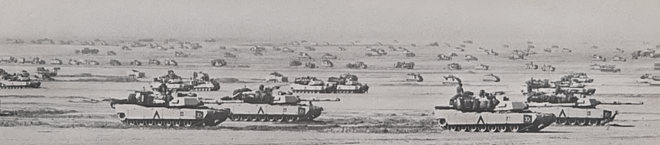
American tanks from the 3rd Armored Division during Operation Desert Storm.

Another crackdown occurred in January and February 1991. Iraqi forces publicly executed suspected members of the Kuwaiti resistance. Kuwaitis were kidnapped, their corpses later deposited in front of their family homes. The bodies of executed Kuwaiti resistance members showed evidence of different kinds of torture, including beating, electrical shock, and fingernail removal. Some 5,000 Palestinians living in Kuwait were arrested for their activities in support of the resistance, and Palestinian support was enough to cause Iraqi officials to threaten Palestinian leaders. Some Palestinians, however, supported Saddam's regime because of sympathies with the Ba'ath party's pugnacious anti-Israel stance. Palestinian members of the resistance sometimes disagreed with resistance tactics such as the boycott of government offices and commercial activity. The Kuwaiti resistance movement was suspicious of this Palestinian ambivalence, and in the weeks after Iraqi forces withdrew, the Kuwaiti government cracked down on Palestinians suspected of sympathizing with the Saddam regime.

Iraqi forces also arrested over two thousand Kuwaitis suspected of helping the resistance and imprisoned them in Iraq. Many of those arrests were made during the Iraqi retreat from Kuwait in February 1991. Hundreds escaped from prisons in southern Iraq after the retreat and over one thousand were repatriated by the Iraqi government, but hundreds remain missing. The fate of 605 Kuwaitis arrested during the occupation remained unknown until 2009, when the remains of 236 of them were identified. Initially, Iraq claimed it had recorded the arrests of only 126 of the 605 missing Kuwaitis. The names of 369 other missing Kuwaitis are stored in files maintained by the International Committee of the Red Cross. Seven of those missing Kuwaitis are women and 24 were under the age of 16 at the time. Iraq has made little effort to address the hundreds of missing Kuwaitis, despite trying to mend diplomatic relations with Kuwait in other ways.

=== Resistance and legitimacy ===
Yahya F. Al-Sumait, Kuwait's housing minister, said in October 1990 that the resistance movement helped undermine the occupation's legitimacy and dispel the idea that Iraq invaded to assist with a popular uprising against the Kuwaiti government. The movement also protected Americans, Britons and other foreigners trapped in Kuwait during the occupation. Some have cited the resistance movement as part of the foundation for a more robust civil society in Kuwait after the occupation.

At the Al Qurain Martyrs Museum, Kuwait remembers its citizens slain during the resistance to Iraqi occupation. The families of those martyrs received material benefits from the Kuwaiti government such as cars, homes, and funding for trips to Mecca for the hajj. Since most accounts of the liberation of Kuwait focus on U.S.-led coalition forces, part of Kuwait's goal in memorializing the resistance is to emphasize Kuwaiti citizens' role in liberating their own country.

== Aftermath ==
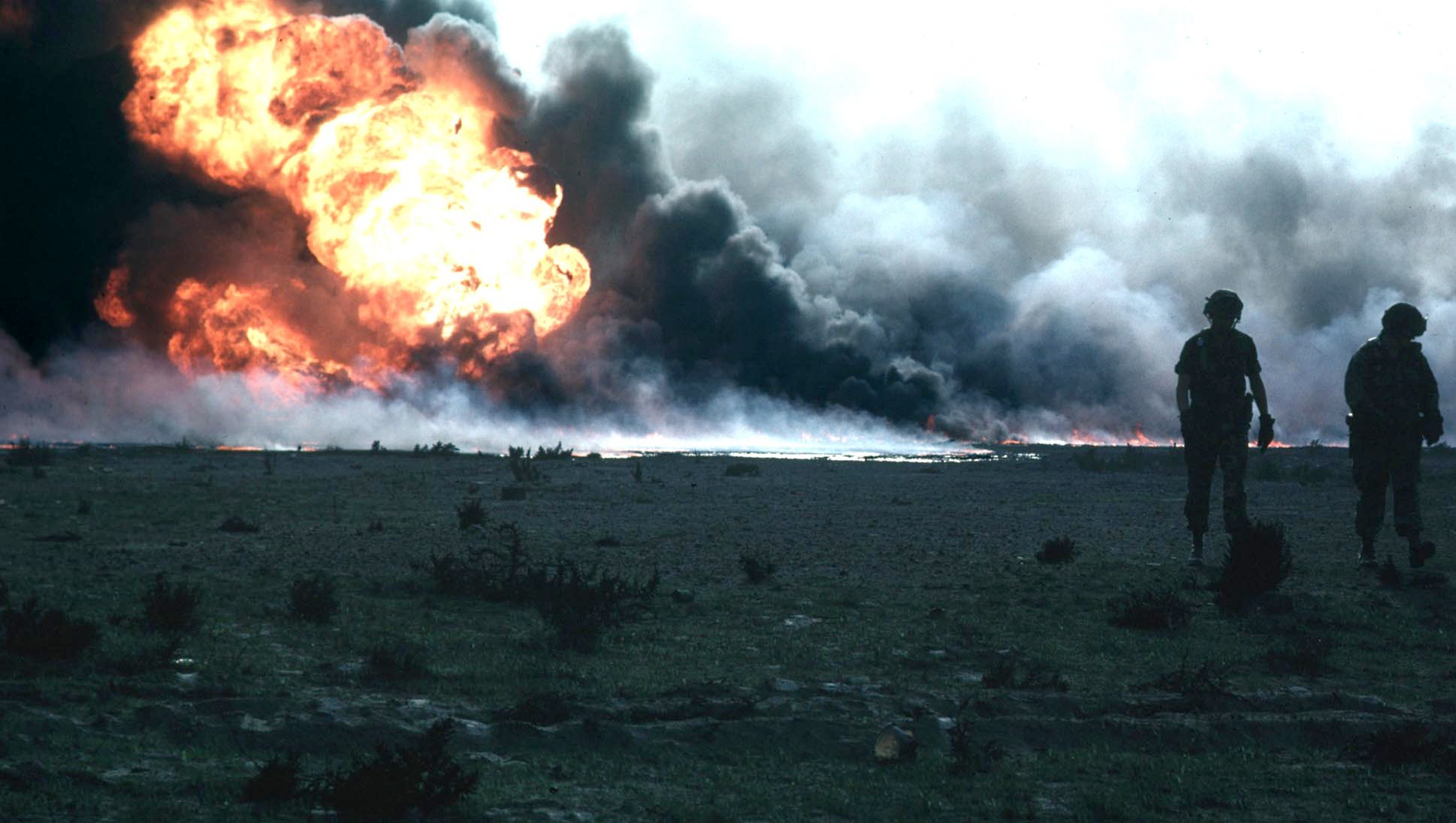
More than 600 Kuwaiti oil wells were set on fire by retreating Iraqi forces, causing massive environmental and economic damage to Kuwait.

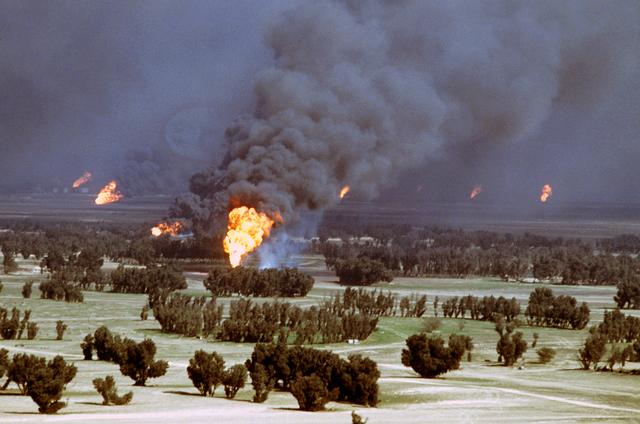
The oil fires caused were a result of the scorched earth policy of Iraqi military forces retreating from Kuwait

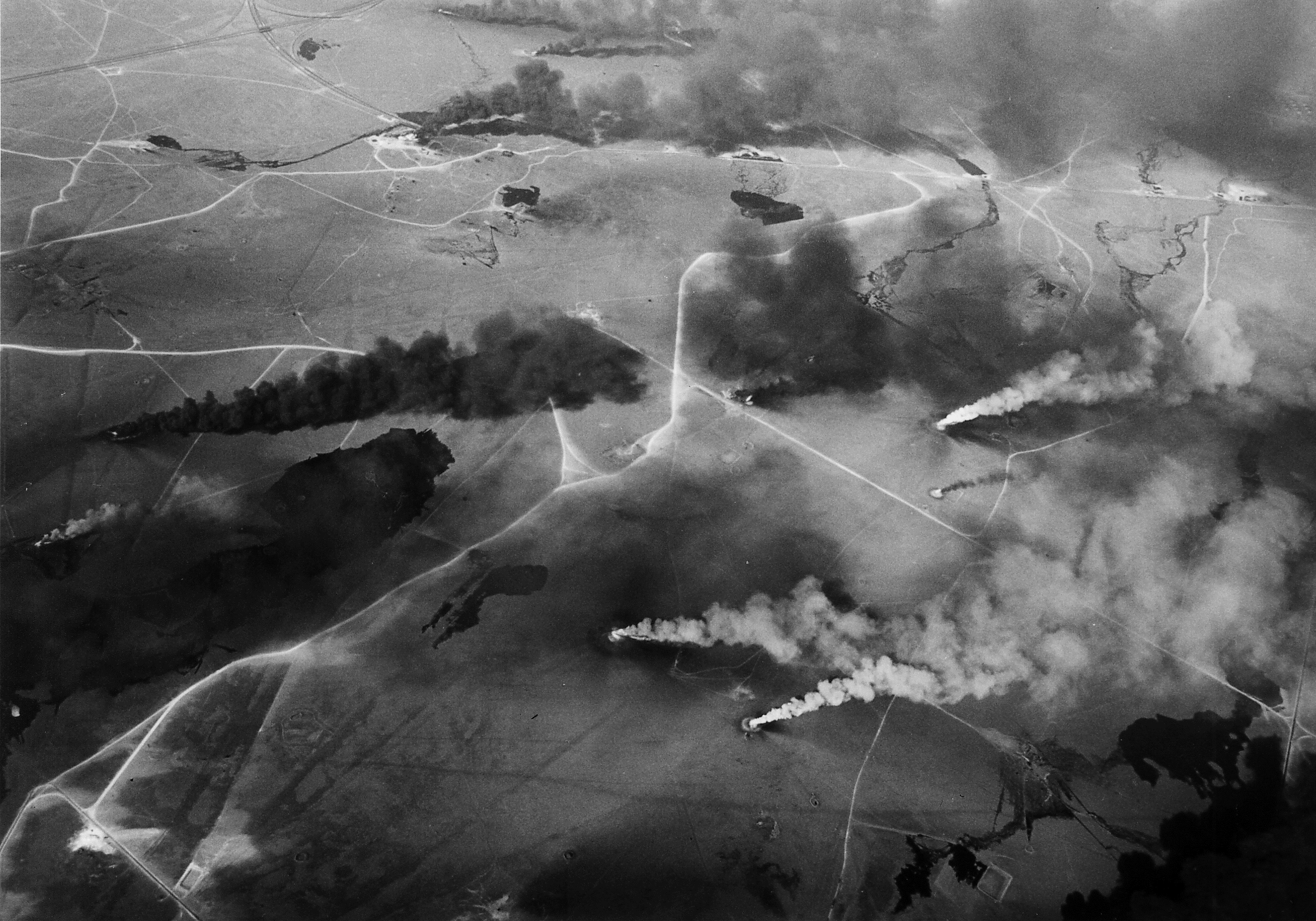
Aerial view of oil wells on fire

After the Iraqi victory, Saddam Hussein installed Alaa Hussein Ali as the prime minister of the "Provisional Government of Free Kuwait" and Ali Hassan al-Majid as the de facto governor of Kuwait. The exiled Kuwaiti royal family and other former government officials began an international campaign to persuade other countries to pressure Iraq to vacate Kuwait. The UN Security Council passed 12 resolutions demanding immediate withdrawal of Iraqi forces from Kuwait, but to no avail.

The UN Security Council also strongly condemned the deportations of Kuwaitis and the settlement of Iraqis in Kuwait. Following the Iraqi invasion of Kuwait, about half of the Kuwaiti population, including 400,000 Kuwaitis and several thousand foreign nationals, fled the country. The Indian government evacuated over 170,000 overseas Indians by flying almost 488 flights over 59 days.

A 2005 study revealed that the Iraqi occupation had a long-term adverse impact on the health of the Kuwaiti populace.

=== International condemnation ===
After Iraqi forces invaded and annexed Kuwait and Saddam Hussein deposed the Emir of Kuwait, Jaber Al-Sabah, he installed Ali Hassan al-Majid as the new governor of Kuwait.

The Iraqi invasion and occupation of Kuwait was unanimously condemned by all major world powers. Even countries traditionally considered to be close Iraqi allies, such as France and India, called for immediate withdrawal of all Iraqi forces from Kuwait. Several countries, including the Soviet Union and China, placed arms embargoes on Iraq. NATO members were particularly critical of the Iraqi occupation of Kuwait and by late 1990, the United States had issued an ultimatum to Iraq to withdraw its forces from Kuwait by 15 January 1991 or face war.

On 3 August 1990, the UN Security Council passed Resolution 660 condemning the Iraqi invasion of Kuwait and demanding that Iraq unconditionally withdraw all forces deployed in Kuwait. The United States and the Soviet Union issued a joint statement condemning Iraq.

After a series of failed negotiations between major world powers and Iraq, the United States-led coalition forces launched a massive military assault on Iraq and Iraqi forces stationed in Kuwait in mid-January 1991. By 16 January, Allied aircraft were targeting several Iraqi military sites and the Iraqi Air Force was destroyed. Hostilities continued until late February and on 25 February, Kuwait was officially liberated from Iraq. On 15 March 1991, the Emir of Kuwait returned to the country after spending more than 8 months in exile. During the Iraqi occupation, about 1,000 Kuwaiti civilians were killed and more than 300,000 residents fled the country.

=== Post–Gulf War ===
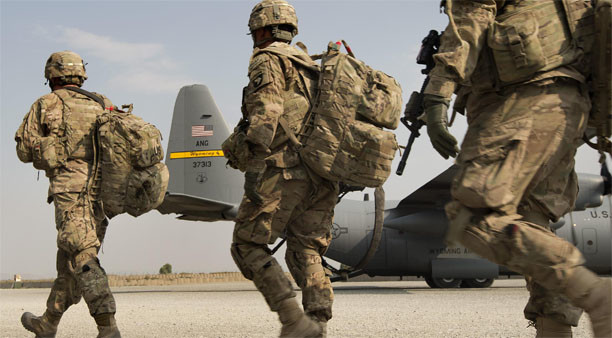
US troops in Kuwait, 2015

In December 2002, Saddam Hussein apologized for the invasion shortly before being deposed in the 2003 invasion of Iraq. Two years later, the Palestinian leadership also apologized for its wartime support of Saddam. In 1990, Yemen's president, Ali Abdullah Saleh, a longtime ally of Saddam Hussein, backed Saddam Hussein's invasion of Kuwait. After Iraq lost the Gulf War, Yemenis were deported en masse from Kuwait by the restored government.

The US military continued a strong presence adding 4,000 troops in February 2015 alone. There is also a very strong US civilian presence with an estimated 18,000 American children in Kuwait being taught by 625 US teachers.

== See also ==
- Operation Vantage (1961)
- Airlift, a Bollywood film based on the Indian evacuation right after the invasion
- United Nations Security Council Resolution 660
- Foreign nationals held by Iraq during the 1990–1991 Gulf crisis
- Persian Gulf war rationale
- Nayirah testimony
