= Saddamiyat al-Mitla' District =

Iraqi district within occupied Kuwaiti territory (1990–1991)

Saddamiyat al-Mitla' District قضاء صدامية المطلاع (Arabic)
- De facto district of Iraq
- 1990–1991
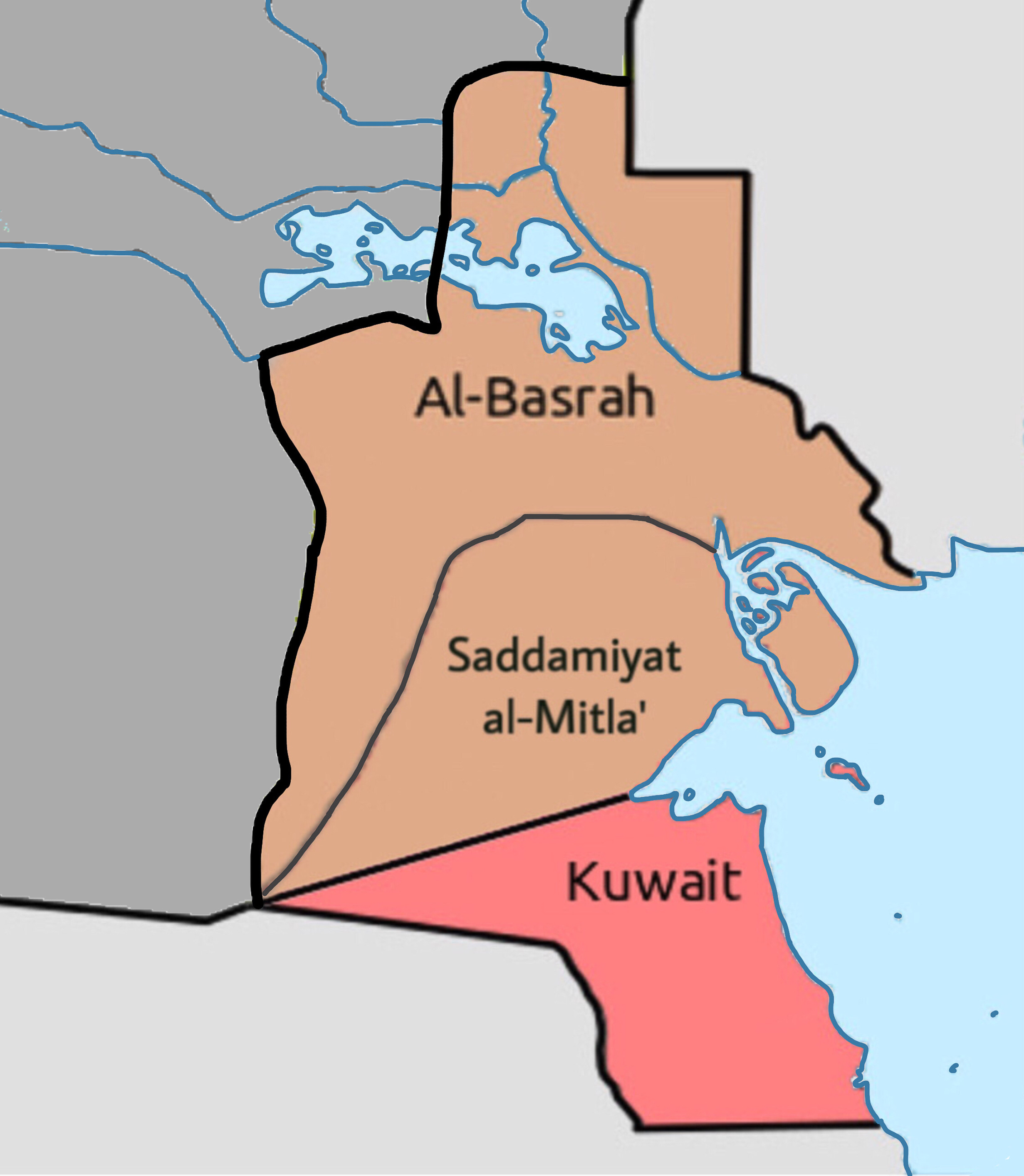
  - Type: Military occupation
- Historical era: Gulf War
  - Republic of Kuwait annexed by Iraq: 28 August 1990
  - Liberation of Kuwait: 26 February 1991
Preceded by	Succeeded by
Republic of Kuwait	State of Kuwait

Saddamiyat al-Mitla' (Arabic: قضاء صدامية المطلاع) was a district in Basra Governorate during the Iraqi occupation of Kuwait 1990–1991. The formation of the district was announced on August 28, 1990. The name sought to honour the Iraqi president Saddam Hussein. Whilst the rest of Kuwait was annexed as the 19th governorate of Iraq, the strategic northern part of Kuwait was annexed as the Saddamiyat al-Mitla' district as part of the Basrah Governorate.

The district covered some 7,000 square kilometres (2700 sq. mi.). It included Warbah Island, Bubiyan Island, the area around Abdali, Raudhatain oil field, Sabriya oil field, Ratqa oil field and the southern part of the Rumaila oil field. Apart from its oil resources, the district held most of the underground water sources of Kuwait. Iraqi media declared that a new city, also named Saddamiyat al-Mitla', would be built in the district.

At the time there was speculation on whether the placing of the Saddamiyat al-Mitla' district in the Basrah Governorate rather than the Kuwait Governorate indicated that Iraq might have been ready to retreat from the rest of Kuwait but keep the northern areas.
