= List of naval ships of the United Arab Emirates =

This is a list of naval ships of the Military of the United Arab Emirates.

== Corvettes ==
- Gowind-class (2 ships)
- Abu Dhabi-class (1 ship)
- Baynunah class (6 ships)
- Muray Jib class (2 ships)
  - Muray Jib
  - Das

== Offshore patrol vessels ==
- Arialah-class (2 ships)
- Falaj 2 class (2 ships)
  - Ganthoot
  - Qarnen
- Falaj 3 class (4 ships planned)

== Fast attack craft ==
- Mubarraz class
  - Mubarraz
  - Makasib
- Ban Yas class
  - Ban Yas
  - Marban
  - Rodom
  - Shaheen
  - Sagar
  - Tarif
- Ardhana class
  - Ardhana
  - Zurara
  - Murban
  - Al Ghullan
  - Radoom
  - Ghanadhah

== Minehunters ==
- Frankenthal class
  - Al Murjan
  - Al Hasbah

== Amphibious warfare ships ==
- Al-Quwaisat-class LST
- Ghannatha

== Bibliography ==
- Saunders, Stephen, ed. (2004). Jane's Fighting Ships 2004–2005. Coulsdon, UK: Jane's Information Group. ISBN 0-7106-2623-1.
