= List of ship launches in 1975 =

The list of ship launches in 1975 includes a chronological list of ships launched in 1975. In cases where no official launching ceremony was held, the date built or completed may be used instead.

Date	Ship	Class and type	Builder	Location	Country	Notes
10 January	Nordic Commander	Tanker	Scott-Lithgow	Greenock	United Kingdom	For Anglo-Nordic Tankers.
22 January	Druzhnyy	Project 1135 large anti-submarine ship	Yantar	Kaliningrad	Soviet Union	For Soviet Navy.
25 January	Adrian Mærsk	Mærsk A-class container ship	Blohm+Voss	Hamburg	West Germany	For A.P. Møller - Mærsk A/S
28 January	Madaraka	Madaraka-class missile boat	Brooke Marine Ltd.	Lowestoft	United Kingdom	For Kenyan Navy.
30 January	Bore Star	Ferry		Nantes	France	For Steamship Company Bore.
1 February	Arco Tyne	Dredger	Appledore Shipbuilders Ltd.	Appledore	United Kingdom	For Consolidated Gold Fields Ltd.
14 February	Saldiray	Type 209 submarine		Kiel	West Germany	For Turkish Navy.
24 February	Kumano	Chikugo-class destroyer escort			Japan	For Japanese Navy.
7 March	Ardhana	Ardhana-class patrol craft	Vosper Thornycroft	Portsmouth	United Kingdom	For United Arab Emirates Navy.
8 March	Vassiliki Colocotronis	Europatanker Ultra Large Crude Carrier	AG Weser	Bremen	West Germany	For Pansegura Armadora S.A.
14 March	Jamhuri	Madaraka-class missile boat	Brooke Marine Ltd.	Lowestoft	United Kingdom	For Kenyan Navy.
21 March	Arthur W. Radford	Spruance-class destroyer	Ingalls Shipbuilding	Pascagoula, Mississippi	United States	For United States Navy.
6 April	Deyatelnyy	Project 1135 large anti-submarine ship	Shipyard No. 532	Kerch	Soviet Union	For Soviet Navy.
14 April	Azerbaihzan	Belorussiya-class cruise ship	Wärtsilä Helsinki Shipyard	Helsinki	Finland	Black Sea Shipping Company
24 April	Newcastle	Type 42 destroyer	Swan Hunter	Wallsend	United Kingdom	For Royal Navy.
25 April	Bishop Burton	Fishing trawler	Beverley Shipbuilding & Engineering Co. Ltd	Beverley	United Kingdom	For Mike Burton Ltd.
26 April	Baton Rouge	Los Angeles-class submarine	Newport News Shipbuilding	Newport News, Virginia	United States	For United States Navy.
9 May	Ardent	Type 21 frigate	Yarrow Shipbuilders	Scotstoun	United Kingdom	For Royal Navy.
10 May	Risnes	Bulk carrier	Appledore Shipbuilders Ltd.	Appledore	United Kingdom	For Jebsens (U.K.) Ltd.
15 May	Fraser Salvator	Offshore supply vessel	Brooke Marine Ltd.	Lowestoft	United Kingdom	For Yngvar Hvistendahl Shipping Co. Ltd. & others.
27 May	Loch Maree	Refrigerated cargo vessel	Scotstoun-Marine	Clydebank	United Kingdom	For C. Connell & Co. Ltd.
5 June	Falke	Albatros-class fast attack craft	Kröger	Rendsburg	West Germany	For German Navy.
13 June	Zurara	Ardhana-class patrol craft	Vosper Thornycroft	Portsmouth	United Kingdom	For United Arab Emirates Navy.
13 June	Leiv Viking	Offshore supply vessel	Kremer-Werft	Elmshorn	West Germany	
21 June	Peterson	Spruance-class destroyer	Ingalls Shipbuilding	Pascagoula, Mississippi	United States	For United States Navy.
24 June	Caron	Spruance-class destroyer	Ingalls Shipbuilding	Pascagoula, Mississippi	United States	For United States Navy.
30 June	Takashio	Uzushio-class submarine			Japan	For Japanese Navy.
1 July	Worth	San Clemente-class oil tanker	National Steel and Shipbuilding Company	San Diego, California	United States	
1 July	Sabalo	Type 209 submarine	Howaldtswerke-Deutsche Werft	Kiel	West Germany	For Venezuelan Navy.
5 July	Lampas	Supertanker	Harland & Wolff	Belfast	United Kingdom	For Shell Tankers Ltd.
19 July	Delfin	Koni-class frigate	Werft 340	Selenodolsk	Soviet Union	For Soviet Navy.
24 July	Hudson Cavalier	Stat 32 tanker	Cammell Laird	Birkenhead	United Kingdom	For John Hudson Fuel & Shipping.
8 August	World Giant	Type "Europatanker" Ultra Large Crude Carrier	AG Weser	Bremen	West Germany	For Chesham Shipping Company.
9 August	Texas	Virginia-class cruiser	Newport News Shipbuilding	Newport News, Virginia	United States	For United States Navy.
23 August	Seaforth Champion	Offshore supply vessel	Beverley Shipbuilding & Engineering Co. Ltd	Beverley	United Kingdom	For Lloyds & Scottish Development Ltd.
24 August	David R. Ray	Spruance-class destroyer	Ingalls Shipbuilding	Pascagoula, Mississippi	United States	For United States Navy.
26 August	Stirling Ash	Offshore supply vessel	Beverley Shipbuilding & Engineering Co. Ltd	Beverley	United Kingdom	For Stirling Shipping Supply Ltd.
27 August	Ardennes	Landing craft	Brooke Marine Ltd.	Lowestoft	United Kingdom	For British Army.
30 August	Berge Emperor	Supertanker		Mitsui	Japan	For Bergesen d.y.
15 September	Murban	Ardhana-class patrol craft	Vosper Thornycroft	Portsmouth	United Kingdom	For United Arab Emirates Navy.
16 September	Al Ghulian	Ardhana-class patrol craft	Vosper Thornycroft	Portsmouth	United Kingdom	For United Arab Emirates Navy.
30 September	Kiev-class aircraft carrier	For Soviet Navy.	Mykolaiv	Minsk	Soviet Union	
4 October	Kronprins Harald	Ferry	Nobiskrug	Rendsburg	West Germany	For Jahre Line.
8 October	Essi Camilla	Bulk carrier	Harland & Wolff	Belfast	United Kingdom	For Ruud Petersen A/S.
11 October	Dwight D. Eisenhower	Nimitz-class aircraft carrier	Newport News Shipbuilding	Newport News, Virginia	United States	For United States Navy.
17 October	Kazakhstan	Belorussiya-class cruise ship	Wärtsilä Helsinki Shipyard	Helsinki	Finland	For Black Sea Shipping Company.
21 October	Oldendorf	Spruance-class destroyer	Ingalls Shipbuilding	Pascagoula, Mississippi	United States	For United States Navy.
1 November	Rocknes	Bulk carrier	Appledore Shipbuilders Ltd.	Appledore	United Kingdom	For Elco Leasing Ltd.
4 November	Tor Scandinavia	Cruiseferry	Flender Werft	Rendsburg	West Germany	For Tor Line.
6 November	Caribe	Type 209 submarine	Howaldtswerke-Deutsche Werft	Kiel	West Germany	For Venezuelan Navy.
6 November	Lovat Salvator	Offshore supply vessel	Brooke Marine Ltd.	Lowestoft	United Kingdom	For Yngvar Hvistendahl Shipping Co. Ltd.
14 November	Don Carlos	Vehicle transporter	Wärtsilä Helsinki Shipyard	Helsinki	Finland	For Rederei AB Soya.
20 November	Avenger	Type 21 frigate	Yarrow Shipbuilders	Scotstoun	United Kingdom	For Royal Navy.
4 December	Albatros-class		Lürssen	Greif	West Germany	For German Navy.
5 December	Liverpool Bridge	Bridge-class OBO carrier	Swan Hunter	Wallsend	United Kingdom	For Bibby Line.
5 December	Navena	Fishing trawler	Beverley Shipbuilding & Engineering Co. Ltd	Beverley	United Kingdom	For J. Marr & Son Ltd.
15 December	Shat-Alarab	Type "Europatanker" Ultra Large Crude Carrier	AG Weser	Bremen	West Germany	For Arab Maritime Petroleum Transport Company
15 December	Radoom	Ardhana-class patrol craft	Vosper Thornycroft	Portsmouth	United Kingdom	For United Arab Emirates Navy.
Unknown date	Bournemouth Belle	Passenger ship	J. Bolson & Son Ltd.	Poole	United Kingdom	For Croson Ltd.
Unknown date	Galatea	Fishing trawler	Bideford Shipyard (1973) Ltd	Bideford	United Kingdom	For Bogg (Holdings) Ltd.
Unknown date	Vision	Fishing trawler	Bideford Shipyard (1973) Ltd	Bideford	United Kingdom	For Donald Patience and George Walker & Sons Ltd.
