= Arialah-class offshore patrol vessel =

Class of patrol boats

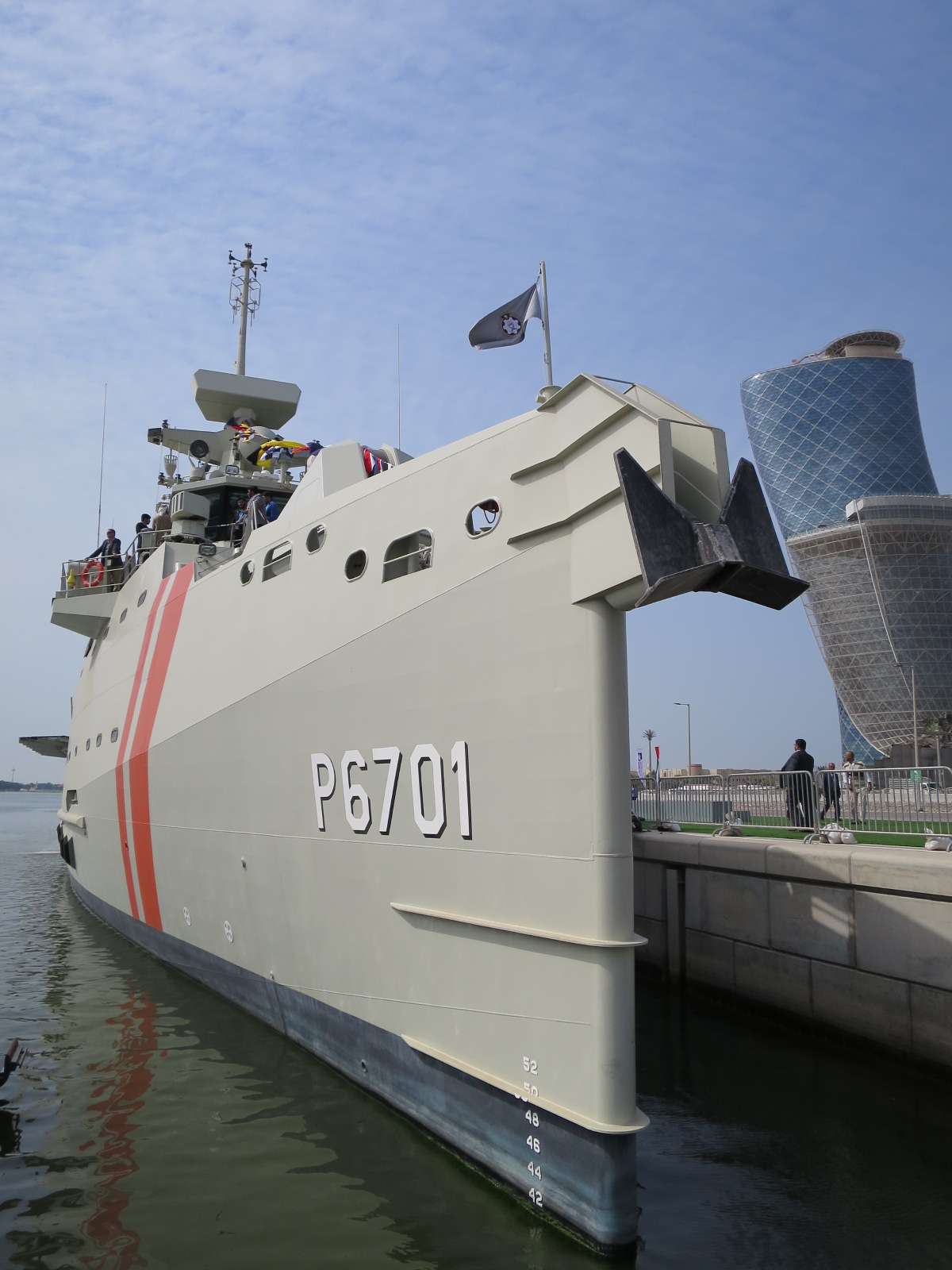
- Arialah at NAVDEX, February 2017

Class overview
- Name: Arialah class
- Builders: Damen Shipyards Galați; Abu Dhabi Ship Building
- Operators: UAE Critical Infrastructure and Coastal Protection Agency
- Built: 2013–2018
- In commission: 2017–present
- Planned: 2
- Completed: 2
- Active: 2

General characteristics
- Type: Patrol boat
- Length: 67 m (220 ft)
- Beam: 11 m (36 ft)
- Draft: 5.4 m (18 ft)
- Propulsion: 4 × MTU diesel engines
- Speed: 20+ knots
- Endurance: 21 days
- Complement: 42 officers and crew + berthing for 35 troops
- Sensors & processing systems: Thales STIR fire control and Thales Smart-S Mark 2 search radar; Mirador electro-optical system
- Electronic warfare & decoys: Multi Ammunition Softkill System
- Armament: 1 × Bofors 57 mm gun Mk3; 2 × OTO Melara Marlin 30 mm guns; 1 × mk49 mod2 11-cell RAM launcher for RAM missile system
- Aviation facilities: Aft helicopter deck

The Arialah class are patrol boats for the United Arab Emirates Critical Infrastructure and Coastal Protection Agency (CICPA). Two ships are planned for this class.

== Description ==
The class was designed by Damen Group, based on its "sea axe" design. The hull was constructed at Damen's Galați shipyard in Romania, with fit out by Abu Dhabi Ship Building and systems integration by Thales Group.

They are armed with a Bofors 57 mm Naval Automatic Gun, Mk 49 Rolling Airframe Missile (RAM) launcher and two OTO Melara Marlin 30mm automatic guns.

== History ==
The contract was originally awarded in December 2013. The lead ship Arialah (P6701) was handed over to CICPA on 21 February 2017 and commissioned the same year. The second off-shore patrol boat in the class, Hmeem (P6702), was commissioned a year later in 2018.

== Ships in class ==
| Ship name | Identification | Builder | Ordered | Commissioned |
|---|---|---|---|---|
| Arialah | P6701 | Damen Shipyards Galați Abu Dhabi Ship Building | 2013 | 2017 |
| Hmeem | P6702 | Damen Shipyards Galați Abu Dhabi Ship Building | 2013 | 2018 |

== Gallery ==
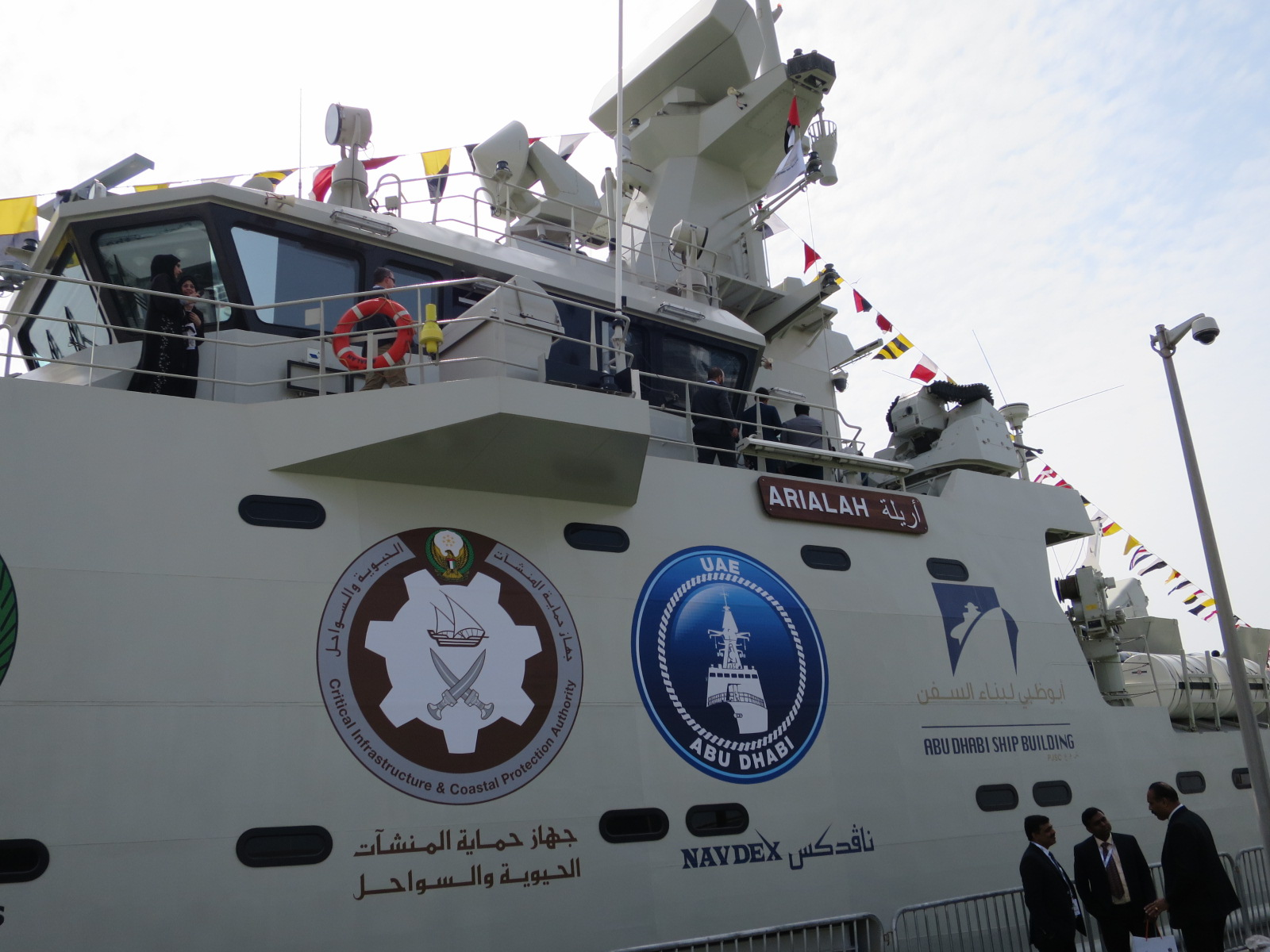
Arialah bridge

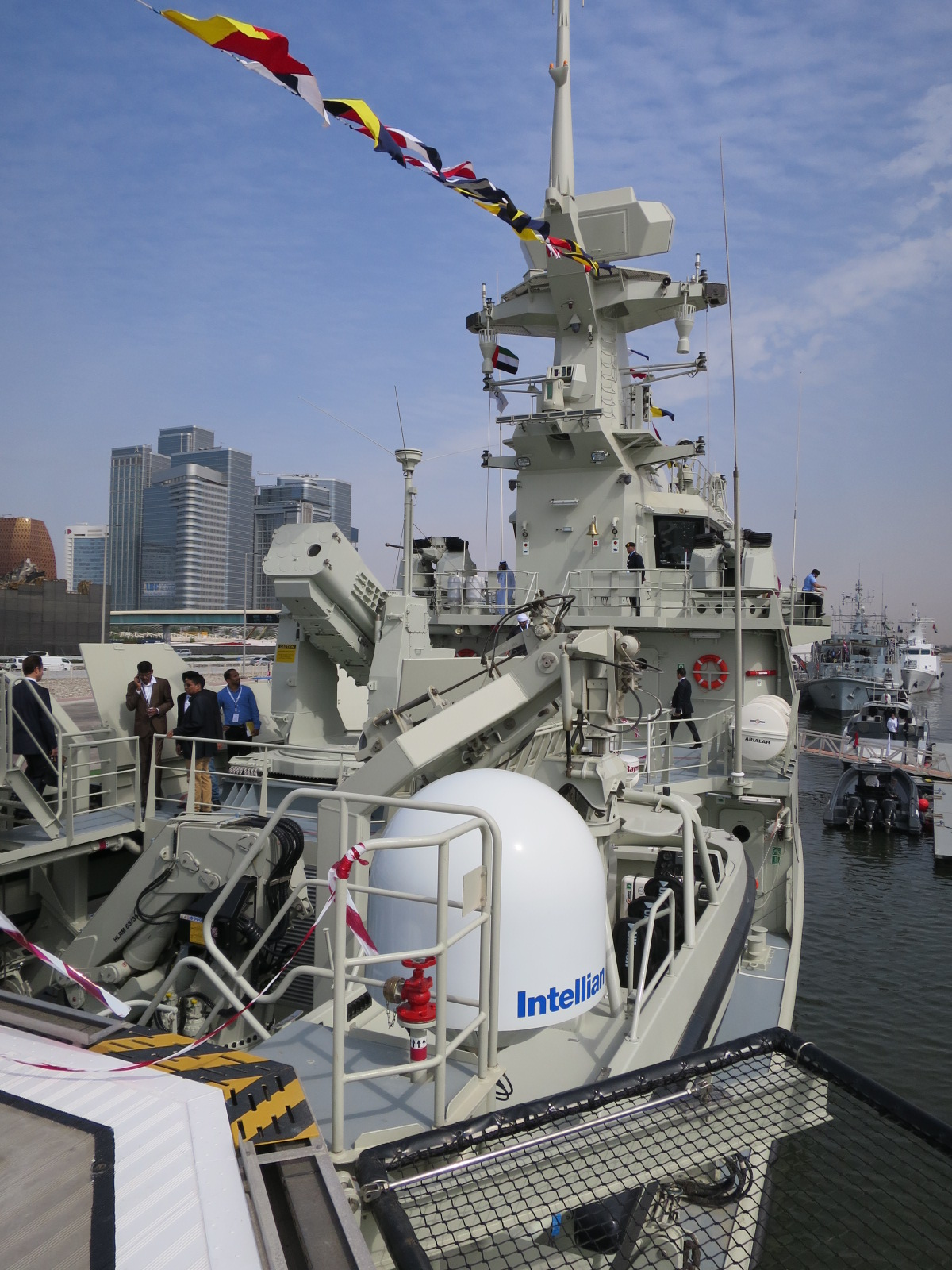
Arialah midship

== See also ==
- United Arab Emirates Navy
