= Kuwait Naval Force =

Maritime branch of Kuwait's military

Kuwait Navy Force
- القوة البحرية الكويتية
- Founded: 1961; 65 years ago
- Country: Kuwait
- Branch: Military of Kuwait
- Type: Navy
- Size: 4,000 personnel
- Part of: Kuwait Armed Forces
- Garrison/HQ: Mohammed Al-Ahmad Kuwait Naval Base
- Nickname: His Highness Sea Vanguard
- Mottos: لله والوطن والامير God, Country & The Emir
- Colors: Green & Red
- Anniversaries: National and Liberation Day (25 and 26 February)
- Engagements: Iran–Iraq War; Invasion of Kuwait; Operation Desert Storm; War on terror; Iraq War

Commanders
- Commander: Major General Saif Abdulhadi Alhamlan

Insignia
- Naval jack

The Kuwait Navy Force (Arabic: القوة البحرية الكويتية, romanized: Al-Quwwat Al-Bahriyah Al-Kuwaitiyah), is the sea-based component of the Kuwait Armed Forces. The headquarters and sole naval base is Mohammed Al-Ahmad Kuwait Naval Base. The Kuwait Naval Force consists of over 2,200 officers and enlisted personnel, excluding about 500 coast guard personnel. The Coast Guard, a Border Security Directorate of the Kuwait Ministry of Interior.

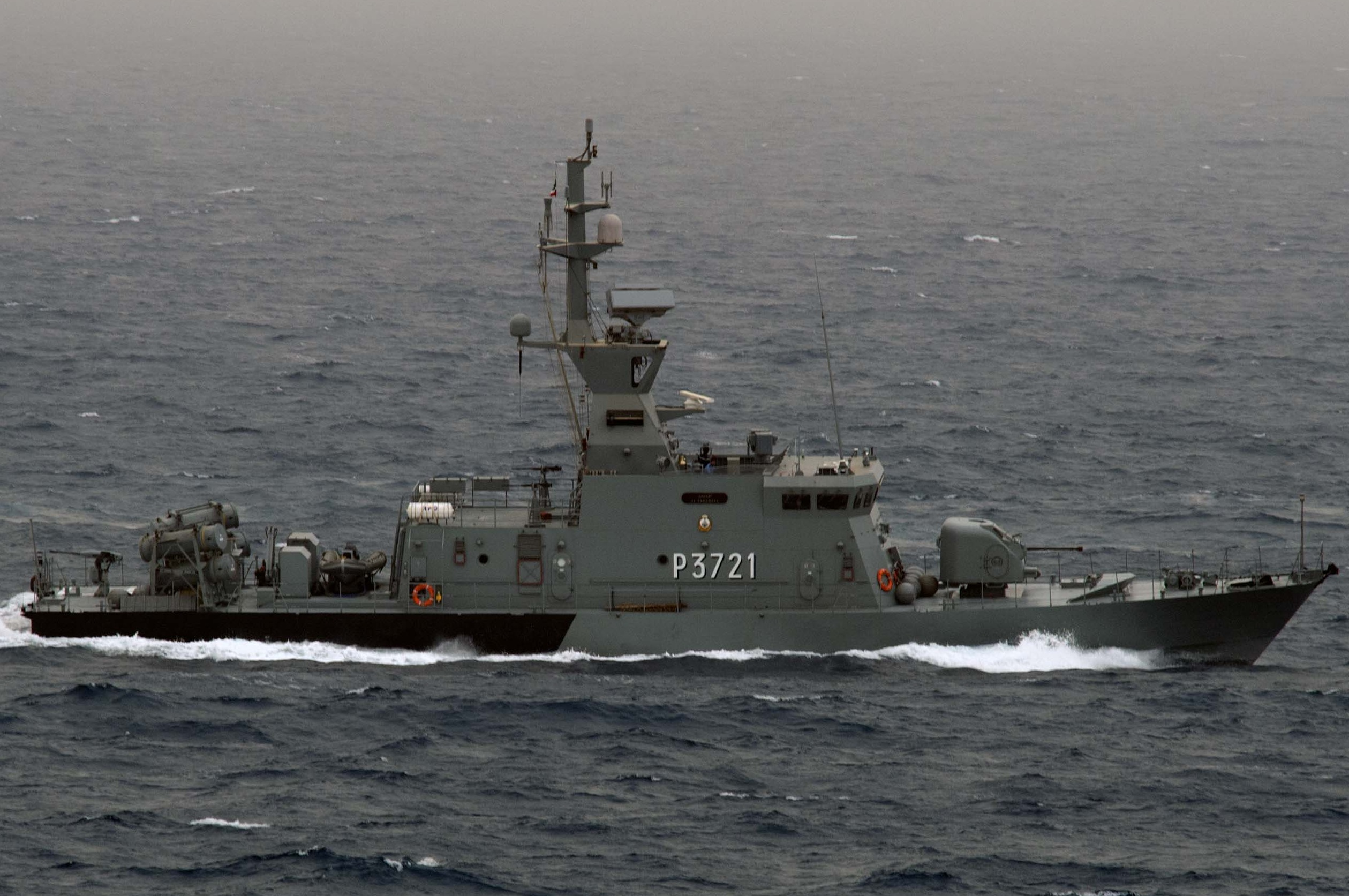
Um Al Maradim La Combattante-class missile-attack-craft Al Fahaheel (P3721) in May 2013

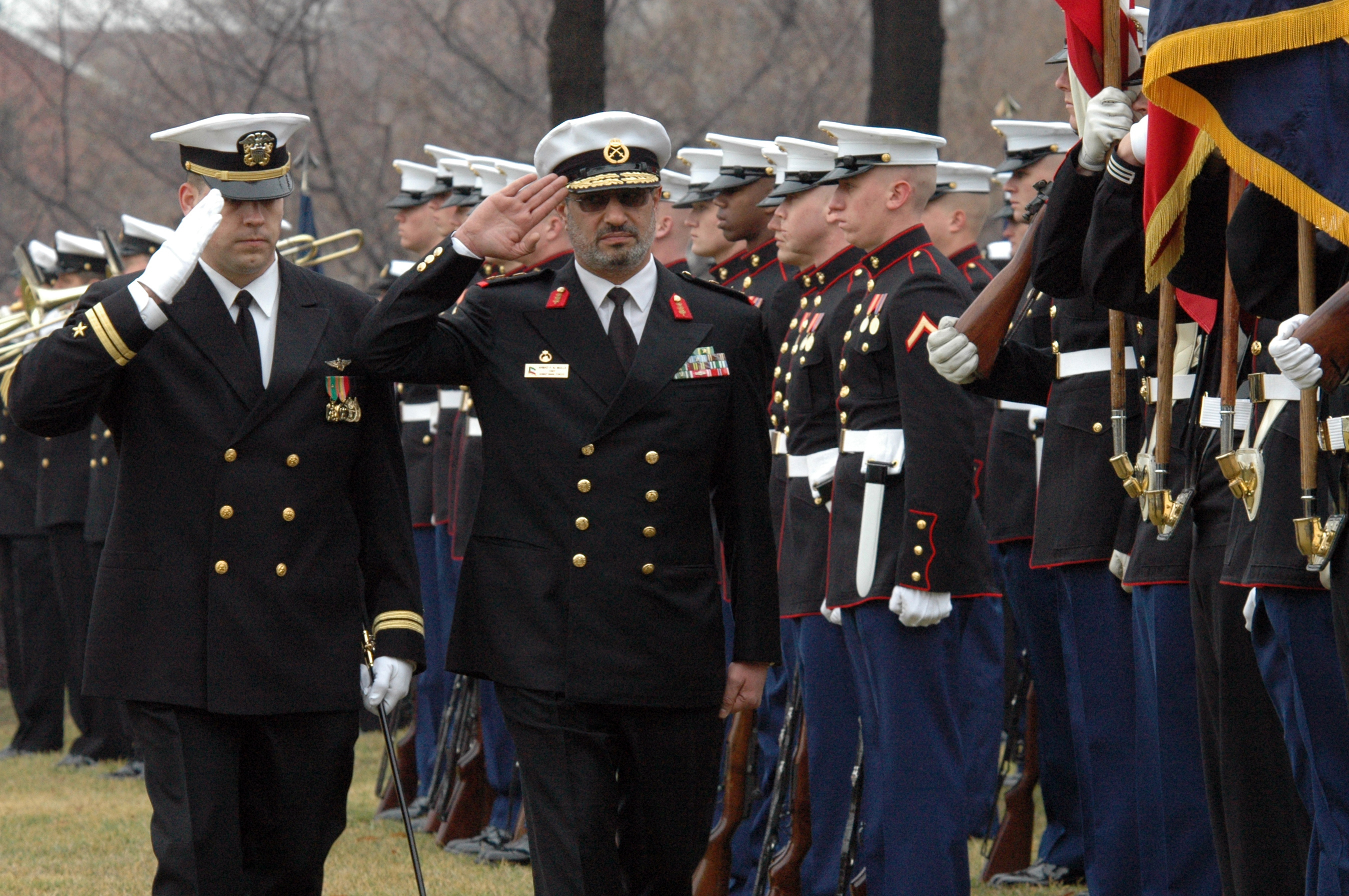
Kuwait Naval Force Chief Combat Commander Major General Al-Mulla conducts a troop inspection during a full honor welcome ceremony on board the Washington Navy Yard on February 15, 2005

== History ==
Kuwait's navy was established in 1961 shortly after Britain ended the country's protectorate status following Operation Vantage.

During the Invasion of Kuwait and Operation Desert Storm, Kuwait's navy was almost completely destroyed. At the start of the invasion, the Iraqi Navy captured and sank five Kuwaiti Lürssen TNC-45 type fast attack craft (missile) and one Lürssen FPB-57 type fast attack craft (missile). Kuwait Naval Forces also lost 20 other ships to Iraq during the war.

On 11 November 2008, Kuwait Naval Base was the location of the historic signing of the non-legally binding maritime Khawr Abd Allah Protocols otherwise known as the KAA Protocols. The signing of the KAA Protocols by the then respective heads of the Kuwaiti Naval Force and the Iraqi Navy was the first formal and successful maritime bilateral military agreement for the co-ordinated and de-conflicted use of the Khawr Abd Allah waterway since before the 1991 Persian Gulf War. The protocols were developed and mediated by Major David Hammond RM, a British Royal Navy barrister in 2008 and they were subsequently ratified by both the Kuwaiti and Iraqi governments before the 11 November 2008 signing. They were subsequently reported to the US Congress within the December 2008 'Measuring Stability and Security in Iraq' report and the text of which have since become public knowledge following leaks in US diplomatic notes.

On 2–3 October 2023, maritime and coast guard forces from Kuwait, Iraq, and the United States completed a two-day joint trilateral exercise focused on counter-piracy, visit, board, search, and seizure (VBSS) operations, and maritime security in the Northern Persian Gulf. Building upon a cooperative initiative established six years prior, the drills involved patrol vessels, supply ships, and aircraft from all three nations to enhance operational readiness and regional interoperability.

In June 2025, the Kuwait Ministry of Defense awarded UAE state-owned defense conglomerate EDGE Group and its shipbuilding subsidiary, Abu Dhabi Ship Building (ADSB), a contract valued at up to $2.45 billion (AED 9 billion) to construct eight 62-meter Falaj 3-class missile fast patrol boats. The program, also designated as the Al-Dorra class in Kuwaiti service, represents one of the largest naval shipbuilding export contracts in the region's history.

In September 2026, the Kuwait Navy held a live-ammunition military exercise off Failaka Island. The drill took place at the island's naval firing range from September 13 to September 30, during which the Kuwait Army Directorate of Moral Guidance and Public Relations issued maritime safety warnings advising civilians to avoid the designated training zone.

== Structure and Organization ==
- Kuwait Naval Warships
- Kuwait Marine Corps
- Kuwait Commando Marine Units

=== List of Missile Fast Patrol Boats (MFPB) ===
Class	Units	Note
Istiqlal (German FPB-57)	1	410 tons full load – 4 MM-40 SSM – commissioned 1983
Al Sanbouk (German TNC-45)	1	255 tons full load – 4 MM-40 SSM – commissioned 1984
Um Al Maradim (Combattante P37-BRL)	8	245 tons full load – 4 Sea Skua SSM – commissioned 1998–2000

=== List of Patrol Fighting Vessels ===
Class	Units	Note
Intisar (Australian OPV-310)	4
Al-Shaheed (FPB 100K)	3
Subahi (FPB 115)	10
Kassir Inshore Patrol Craft	3
Victory Team (P-46)	16
Inshore Patrol Crafts	50
Mark V Special Operations Craft	10

==== List of Amphibious Vessels and Landing Craft ====
Class	Units	Note
Al-Tahaddy LCU	2
Safar (Loadmaster) LCU	1
LCU (ST Marine)	1
Saffar (L 6401)	2	64m landing craft built by ADSB in UAE
Sabhan (L 4201)	1	42m landing craft built by ADSB in UAE
Sea Keeper	5	16m fast landing craft built by ADSB in UAE
Air-cushioned landing craft	2

=== List of Supply Vessels ===
Class	Units	Note
Sawahil ( Dorrar Support Ship)	1
Nautilus (Swiftship 176) SDV	2

== Future ships ==
- 1 DSV (Diving Support Vessel)

Landing craft, the procurement programme for the Kuwait Navy included the acquisition of two 64 m landing craft, one 42 m landing craft and five 16 m composite landing craft; all will be built at the Abu Dhabi Ship Building (ADSB) facilities in the Mussafah industrial area (UAE) all delivered except one 64 m landing craft to be delivered in 2017.

EDGE has announced the signing of a major AED 9 billion (USD 2.45 billion) defence contract with the Kuwait Ministry of Defence for the supply of 8 FALAJ-3 62-metre missile boats. This contract marks the largest naval shipbuilding export in the region and ranks among the highest-value naval export deals globally.

== See also ==
- Chief of the General Staff (Kuwait)
- Ministry of Defense (Kuwait)
- Military ranks of Kuwait
