= Abu Dhabi-class corvette =

Ship class

Class overview
- Builders: Fincantieri
- Operators: United Arab Emirates Navy
- Planned: 1
- Completed: 1
- Active: 1

General characteristics
- Type: Corvette
- Displacement: 1,650 t (1,620 long tons)
- Length: 88.4 m (290 ft 0 in)
- Beam: 12.2 m (40 ft 0 in)
- Draught: 4.6 m (15 ft 1 in)
- Propulsion: 2 × MTU diesels 20V 1163 TB93 (7,000 kW each)
- Speed: 25 knots (46 km/h; 29 mph)
- Range: 3,000 nmi (5,600 km; 3,500 mi) at 14 knots (26 km/h; 16 mph)
- Endurance: 20 days
- Complement: 70 officers and crew
- Sensors & processing systems: command and control system; IPN-S (SELEX Sistemi Integrati); combined radar/electro-optical FCS NA-30S (SELEX Sistemi Integrati); 3D multifunction radar KRONOS 3D NV (SELEX Sistemi Integrati); secondary radar SIR-M (SELEX Sistemi Integrati); electro-optical director Medusa MK4B; Thales' Captas Nano lightweight low-frequency active sonar
- Electronic warfare & decoys: 2 × self-defence decoy system MASS (Multi Ammunition Soft-kill System) (Rheinmetall); 1 × Seal-H electronic warfare system (Elettronica)
- Armament: 1 × OTO Melara 76 mm/62 super rapido stealth mount; 2 × twin launcher MBDA MM40 block 3 Exocet missiles; 2 × Mk.32 launcher for EuroTorp-A244-S or Mk.46-Torpedoes; RAM Block II launchers, 21 missiles each (planned); 2 × launchers for C310 torpedo countermeasures system; 2 × ATK Mk.44 30 mm Oto Melara „MARLIN“
- Aviation facilities: Flight deck and retractable hangar for Panther and Super Puma

The Abu Dhabi class comprises one corvette of the United Arab Emirates (UAE) Navy and is to be used primarily for anti-submarine warfare in addition to patrol and maritime reconnaissance tasks.

== Mission profile ==
Due to the heightened threat situation in the Persian Gulf and the Arabian Sea, the United Arab Emirates Navy is expanding its capabilities to operate away from coastal waters. The main task of the Abu Dhabi class will be patrol service, maritime surveillance, reconnaissance and engagement of sea and land targets in national and international operations. One focus is to cover the United Arab Emirates Navy's sub-hunting capability. In addition, the requirements include good self-protection against sea, submarine and air targets. The minimised radar reflective surface of the design takes into account the current standard for stealth capability.

== Description ==
The Abu Dhabi class is based on the Comandanti-class patrol vessel (or Cigala Fulgosi class) of the Italian Navy. The unit has a stealth design. The ship was built in Italy with mostly Italian armament and electronics. The artillery armament consists of the 76/62 super Rapido cannon, also with a stealth cupola, and two 30 mm MARLIN machine guns from OTO Melara. The combat, fire direction and radar system is supplied by Selex Sistemi Integrati, responsible for the communications system, while the electronic warfare system was built by Elettronica SpA, a company in the Finmeccanica group (from 2017 Leonardo), which has been active in the Emirate for 20 years and has a joint venture with Baynunah Aviation Technology (ELTBAT), working with the Emirati Armed Forces, to which it supplies cutting-edge technology. The ship has a length of 88.40 metres (290 ft 0 in) and a displacement of 1,650 tonnes (1,620 long tons) when fully loaded. It can exchange tactical data in real time with other naval units, helicopters and land bases and provide support and shelter for helicopters for the Emirates Navy. In addition to high operational flexibility, the unit also features high standards of safety and habitability for the comfort of the crew of 70.

== History ==
The construction contract was signed by the United Arab Emirates with Fincantieri in 2009, with option for a second unit. The hull of the namesake of the class, the Abu Dhabi, was built by Fincantieri at the shipyard in Riva Trigoso (Genoa) and then transferred by pontoon to Muggiano (La Spezia) for outfitting.

The ship was christened on 15 February 2011, the same day as the keel-laying ceremony for the first Falaj 2-class patrol vessel and the first metal cutting for the second boat of the same class. The contract for the construction of these vessels, which includes an option for a further two vessels to be built in the Emirates, has brought 184 million euros into Fincantieri's portfolio. Fincantieri itself has then set up in the Gulf emirate the Etihad Ship Building LLC, a joint venture created in 2010 between Fincantieri, Al Fattan Shipyard Industry, owner of a shipyard in Abu Dhabi, and Melara Middle East created for the design, production and sale of different types of civil and military ships as well as maintenance and refitting activities.

The corvette Abu Dhabi, together with the patrol vessel Ganthoot, the first unit of the Falaj-2 class patrol vessel type, after having completed their outfitting at Marinalles La Spezia, were delivered to the United Arab Emirates Navy on 8 January 2013.

== Ships ==
Although the option for a second ship was agreed upon when the contract was signed, the class consists only of the type ship.

Abu Dhabi (P 191)

== See also ==
- Baynunah-class corvette
