= Abu Dhabi Ship Building =

Ship manufacturing company

- Type: Public
- Traded as: ADX:ADSB
- Industry: Shipbuilding
- Founded: 1996
- Headquarters: Abu Dhabi, United Arab Emirates
- Key people: David Massey (CEO)
- Number of employees: 500-1000 (2023)
- Parent: Edge Group

Abu Dhabi Ship Building (ADSB) is a shipbuilding company established in 1996 in the United Arab Emirates. It specializes in the construction, repair, and refit of naval and commercial vessels. ADSB serves as a key defense asset for the UAE, providing a range of services including the building and maintenance of various types of ships and marine components.

== History ==
Established in 1995, Abu Dhabi Ship Building was formed as a joint venture between the Government of Abu Dhabi and Newport News Shipbuilding (NNS). Emiri Decree No. 5 of 1995 officially mandated ADSB to develop an industrial base for constructing a wide range of vessels, marine components, and equipment, in addition to conducting maintenance and repair operations. The company has since grown significantly, solidifying its position as a key player in the naval defense sector and a vital asset for the UAE.

== Operations ==
ADSB constructs and maintains naval and commercial vessels at its shipyard in Abu Dhabi's Mussafah Industrial Zone, spanning over 300,000 square meters. Its portfolio includes frigates, offshore patrol vessels, and fast patrol vessels. It also provides associated maintenance, repair, and engineering services.

== Projects ==
=== Baynunah-class Corvettes ===
Abu Dhabi Ship Building served as the primary contractor for the construction of the Baynunah-class corvettes for the United Arab Emirates Navy. Under a contract awarded in 2004, ADSB constructed five of the six 72-meter vessels at its Mussafah shipyard, with the lead ship constructed by French shipbuilder CMN as technology transfer. Designed for multi-mission naval operations in coastal waters, the vessels feature stealth characteristics, air defense missile systems, anti-ship missiles, and combat management systems.

=== BR71 MKII Corvettes ===
The BR71 MKII corvette is an advanced export variant and a direct design derivative of the BR71 baseline family, which also formed the basis for the UAE Navy's Baynunah-class corvettes. While the Baynunah class was built specifically for the United Arab Emirates Navy, the BR71 MKII has been marketed for international defense contracts. In February 2023, Abu Dhabi Ship Building (ADSB) secured an export contract valued at approximately €1 billion with the Angolan Navy to supply three 71-meter BR71 MKII corvettes equipped with advanced radar suites, anti-ship missiles, and 3D search capabilities.

=== Falaj 3-class offshore patrol vessel ===
In 2021, the UAE's Ministry of Defense awarded ADSB a contract valued at AED 3.5 billion ($950 million) to design and construct four 60-meter Falaj 3-class offshore patrol vessels for the UAE Navy. Based on Fearless-class designs, the multi-mission vessels are equipped with advanced sensor suites, anti-ship missile launchers, air defense systems, and 76mm main guns intended for surveillance, patrol, and littoral combat operation.

=== Ghannatha-class fast patrol boats ===
ADSB constructed and upgraded the Ghannatha-class fast transport and patrol craft for the UAE Navy and Critical Infrastructure and Coastal Protection Authority (CICPA). Initially built as 27-meter aluminum troop transports, ADSB completed a major modernization program to convert and retrofit the fleet into missile-launching fast attack craft and fire-support vessels fitted with modern combat systems and remotely operated weapon stations.

=== RABDAN FA-400 Patrol Vessel ===
Developed by Abu Dhabi Ship Building (ADSB) using a modular concept, the RABDAN FA-400 is an offshore patrol vessel (OPV) designed for coastal surveillance, search and rescue, and naval operations. Constructed with a marine-grade steel hull and aluminum alloy superstructure, the vessel features a baseline length of 42 to 45 meters, reaches top speeds over 30 knots powered by four MTU diesel engines, and maintains a 1,500-nautical-mile range. The platform accommodates up to 30 crew members and can be equipped with remote weapon stations up to 57 mm, anti-ship missiles, decoy systems, and a Command Management System (CMS).
