= Military ranks of Kuwait =

The military ranks of Kuwait are the military insignia used by the Kuwait Armed Forces. Kuwait shares a rank structure similar to that of the United Kingdom.

== Commissioned officer ranks ==
The rank insignia of commissioned officers.

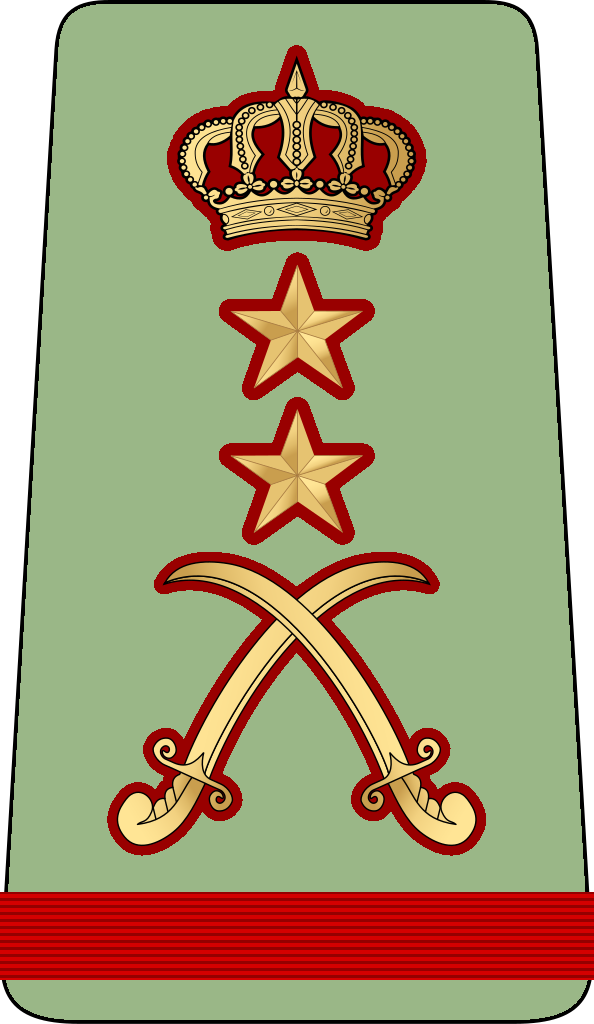
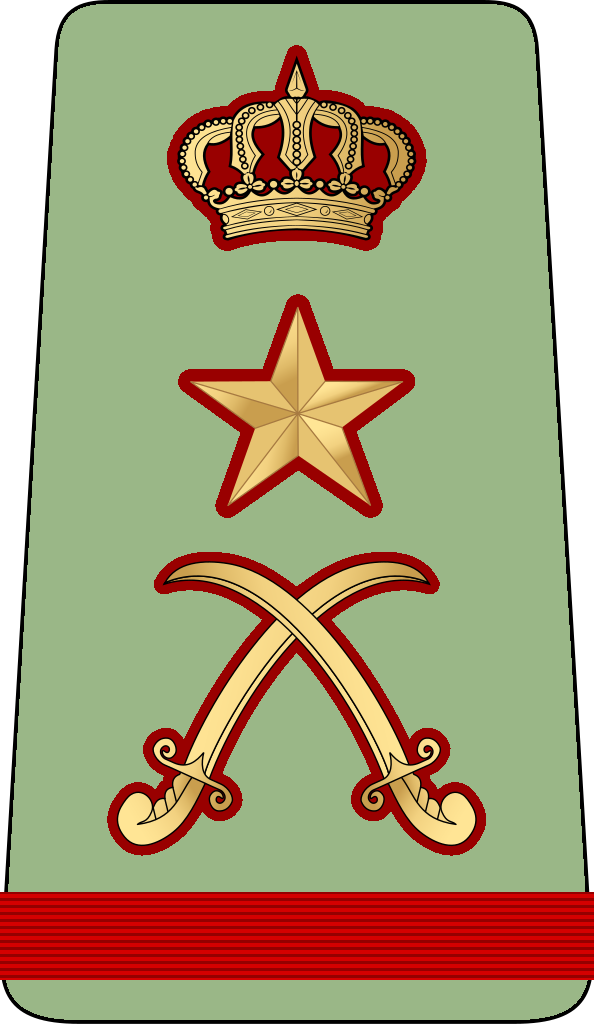
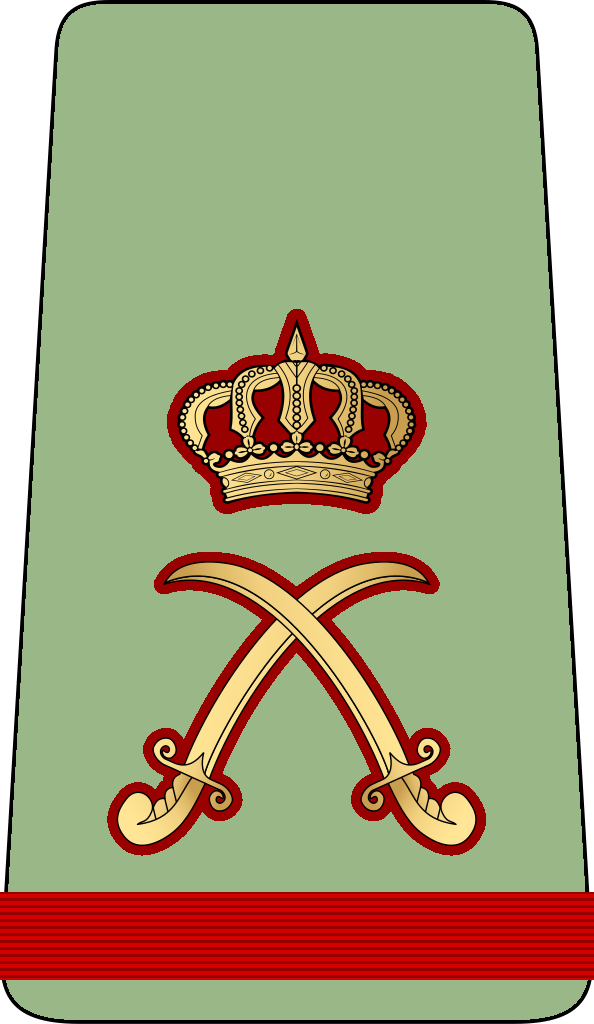
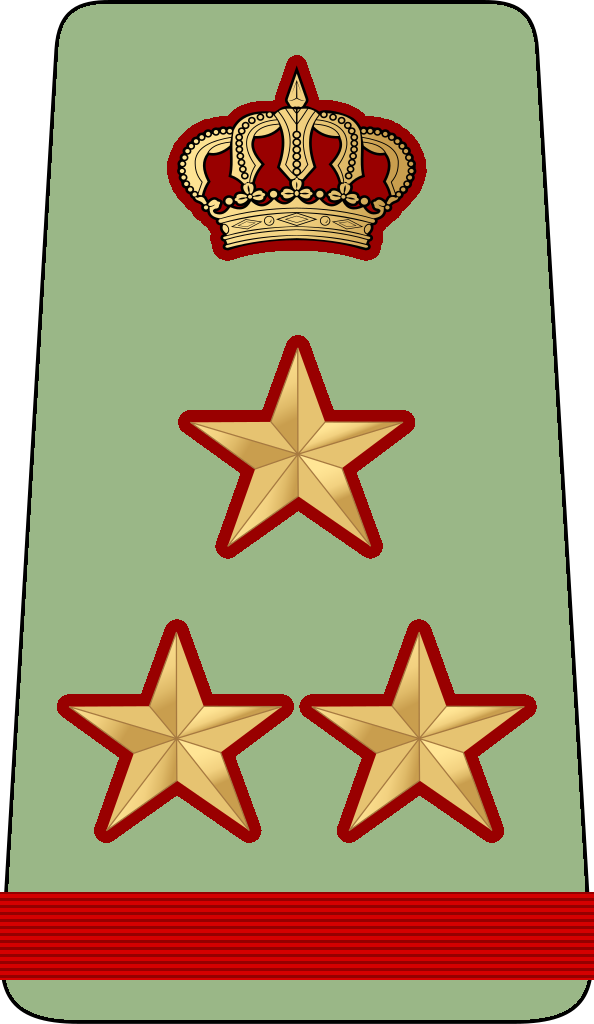
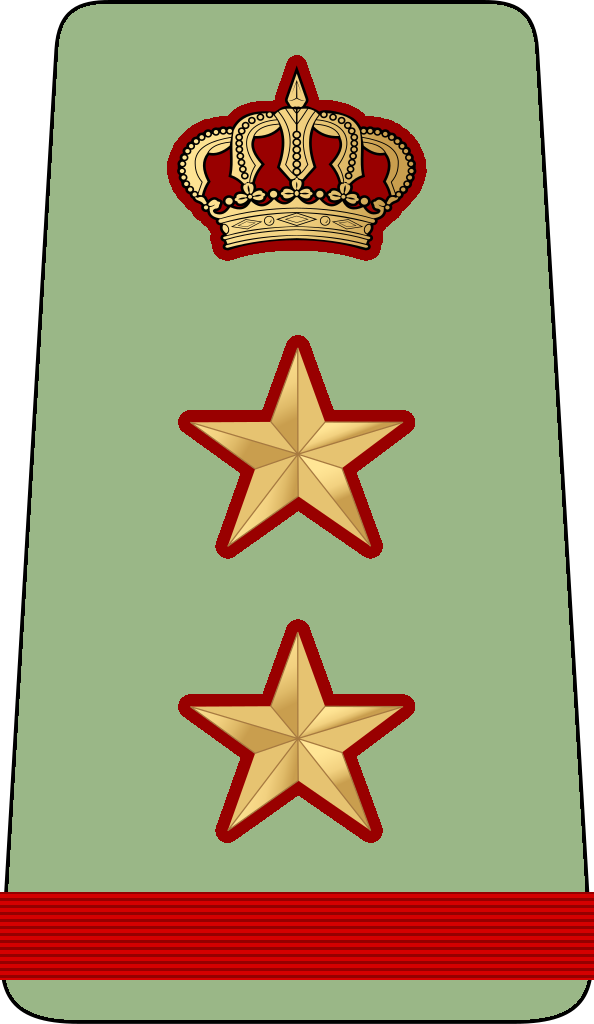
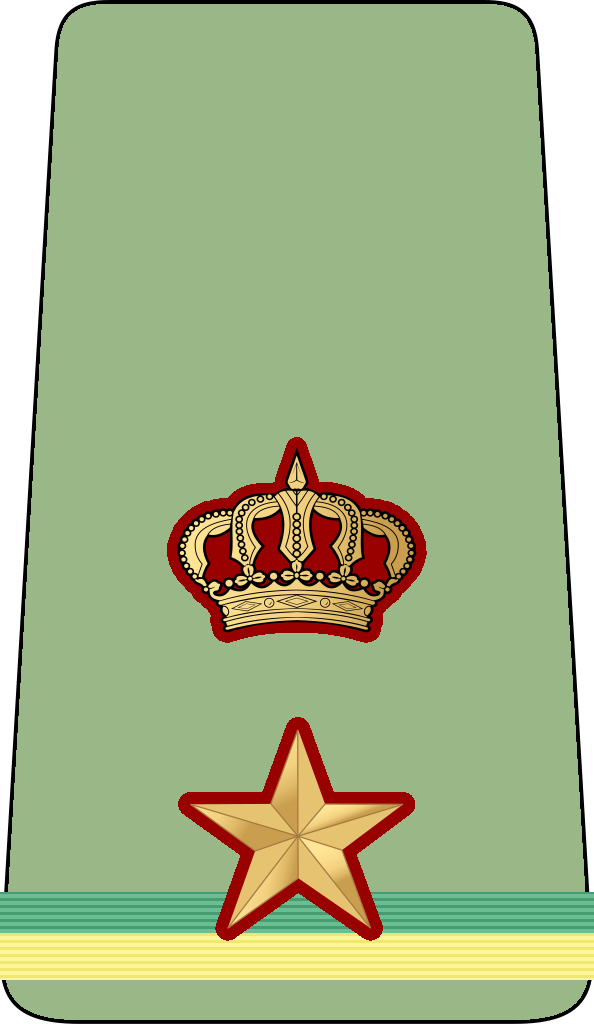
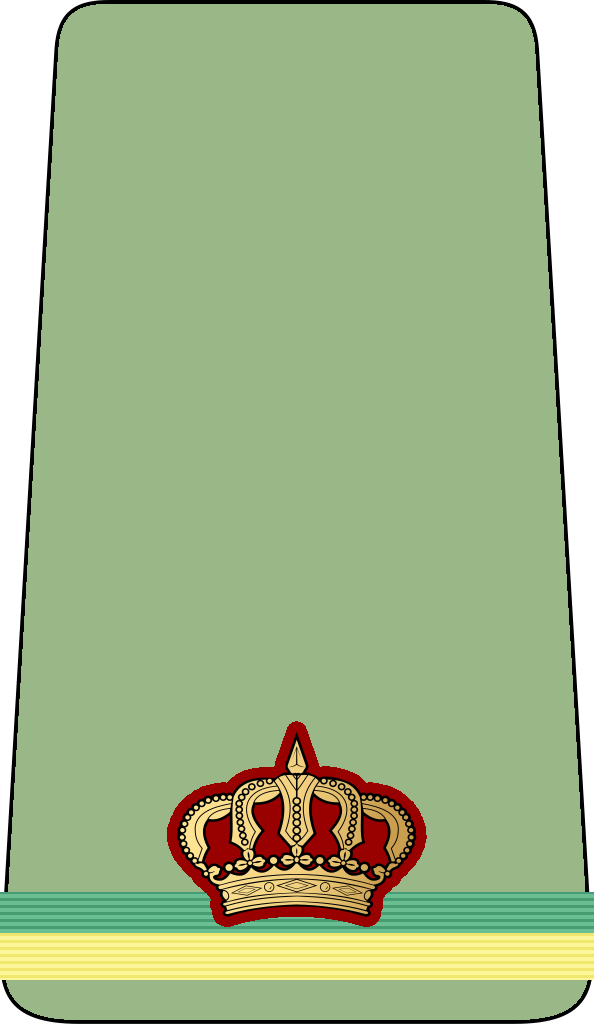
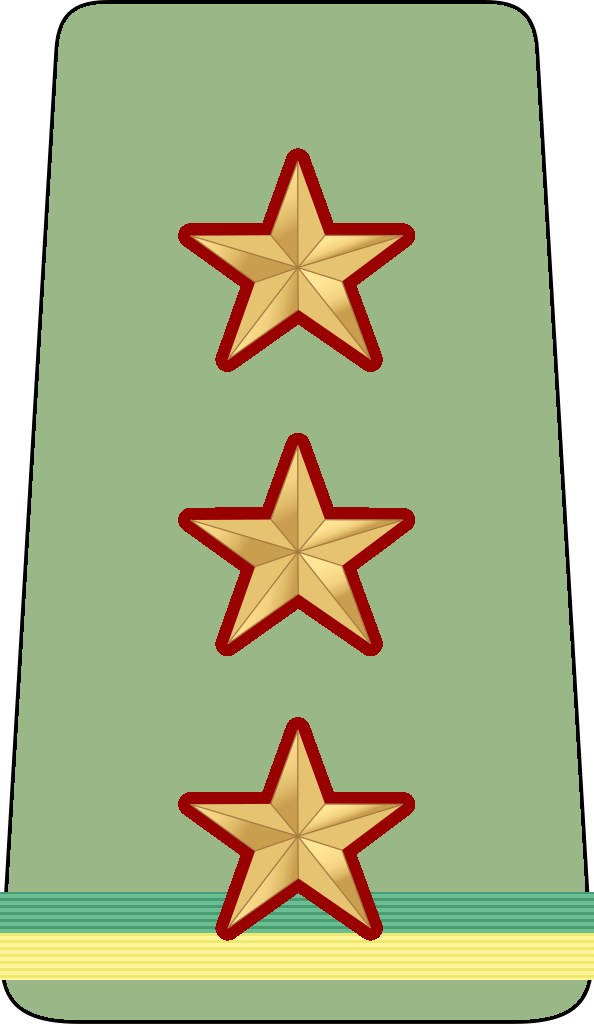
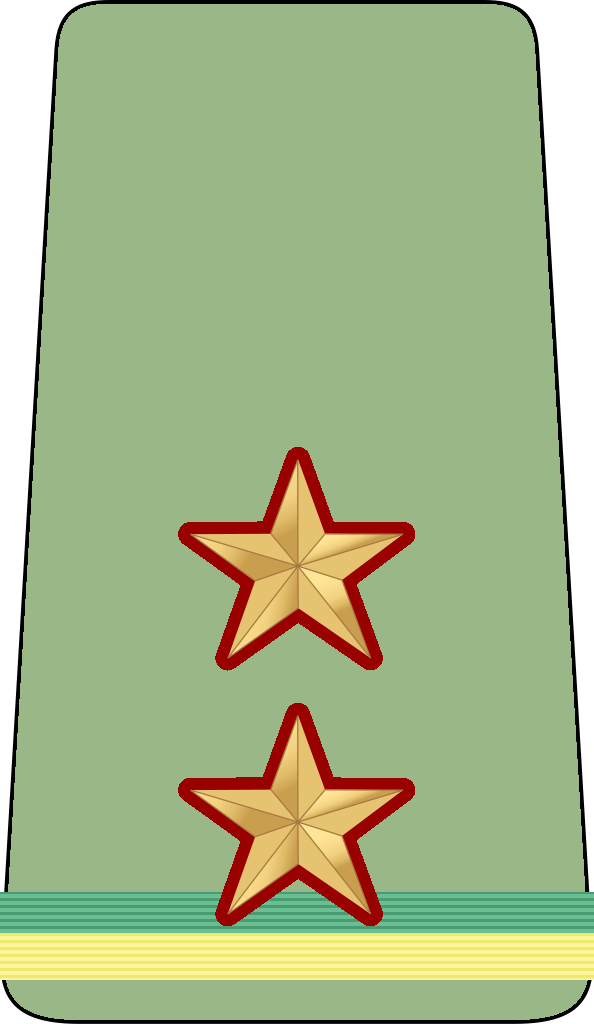
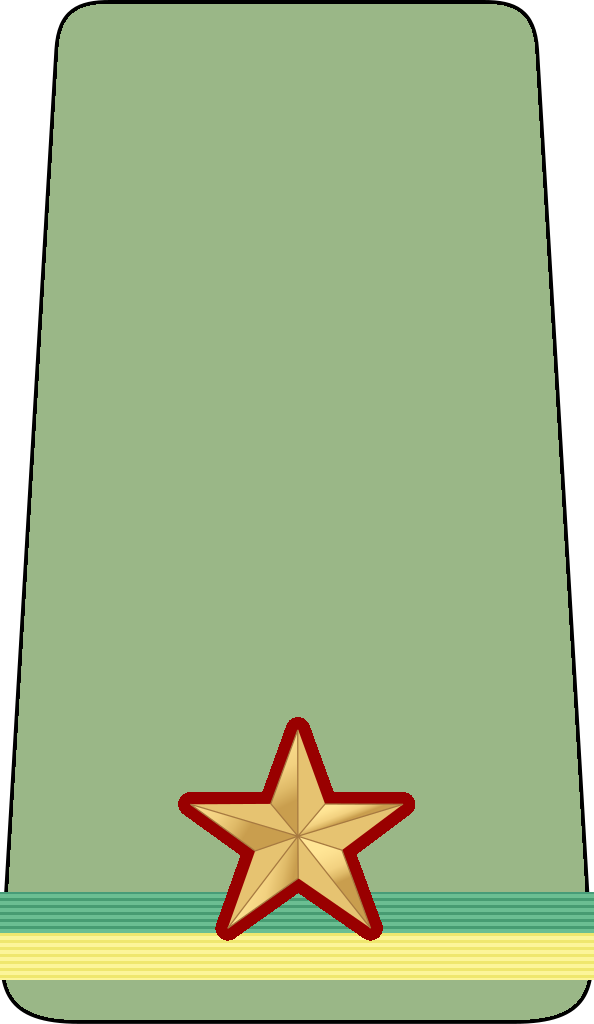
Rank group	General / flag officers				Senior officers			Junior officers
Kuwait Army
Kuwait Army	فريق أول; Fariq 'awal	فريق; Fariq	لواء; Liwa	عميد; Amid	عقيد; Aqid	مقدم; Muqaddam	رائد; Ra'id	نقيب; Naqib	ملازم أول; Mulazim awwal	ملازم; Mulazim
Kuwait Navy
Kuwait Navy	فريق أول; Fariq 'awal	فريق; Fariq	لواء; Liwa	عميد; Amid	عقيد; Aqid	مقدم; Muqaddam	رائد; Ra'id	نقيب; Naqib	ملازم أول; Mulazim awwal	ملازم; Mulazim
Kuwait Air Force
Kuwait Air Force	فريق أول; Fariq 'awal	فريق; Fariq	لواء; Liwa	عميد; Amid	عقيد; Aqid	مقدم; Muqaddam	رائد; Ra'id	نقيب; Naqib	ملازم أول; Mulazim awwal	ملازم; Mulazim
Kuwait National Guard
Kuwait National Guard	فريق أول; Fariq 'awal	فريق; Fariq	لواء; Liwa	عميد; Amid	عقيد; Aqid	مقدم; Muqaddam	رائد; Ra'id	نقيب; Naqib	ملازم أول; Mulazim awwal	ملازم; Mulazim
Rank group	General / flag officers				Senior officers			Junior officers

== Other ranks ==
The rank insignia of non-commissioned officers and enlisted personnel.

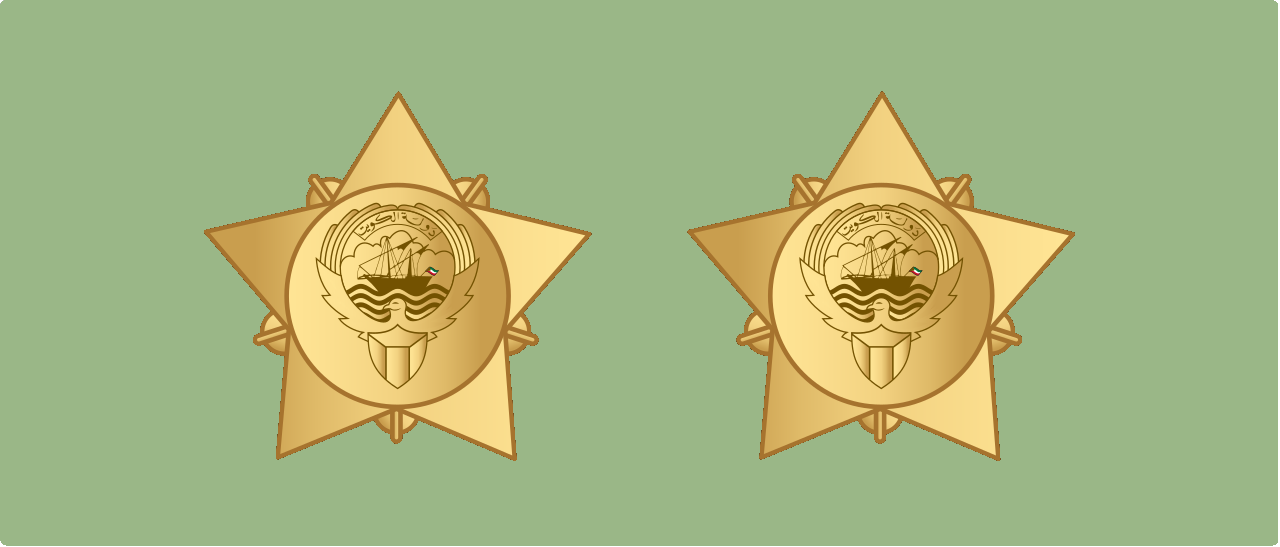
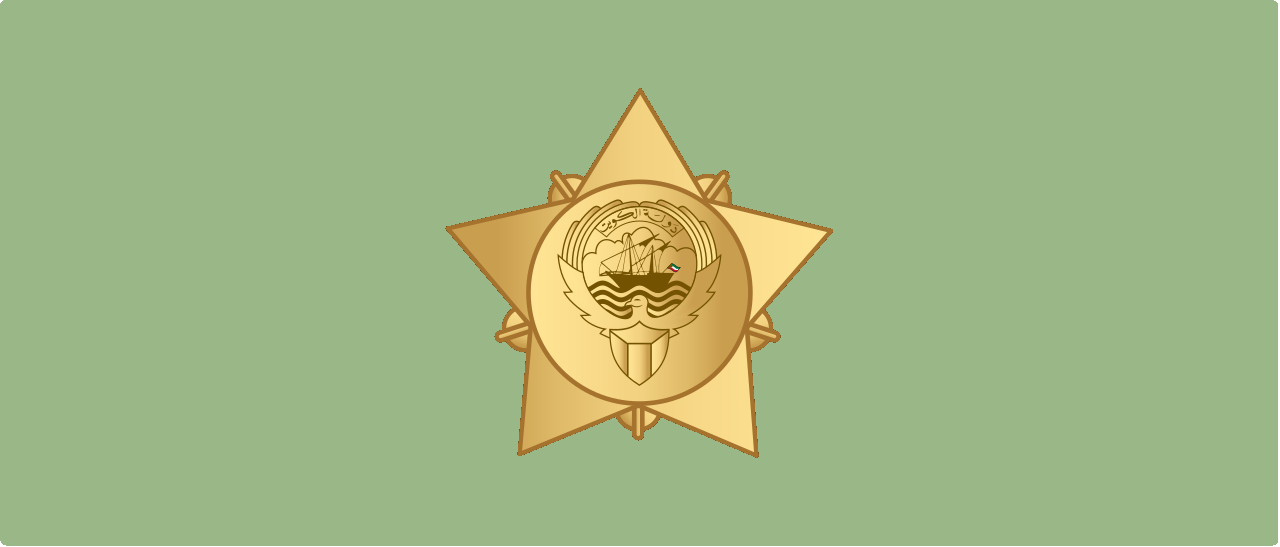
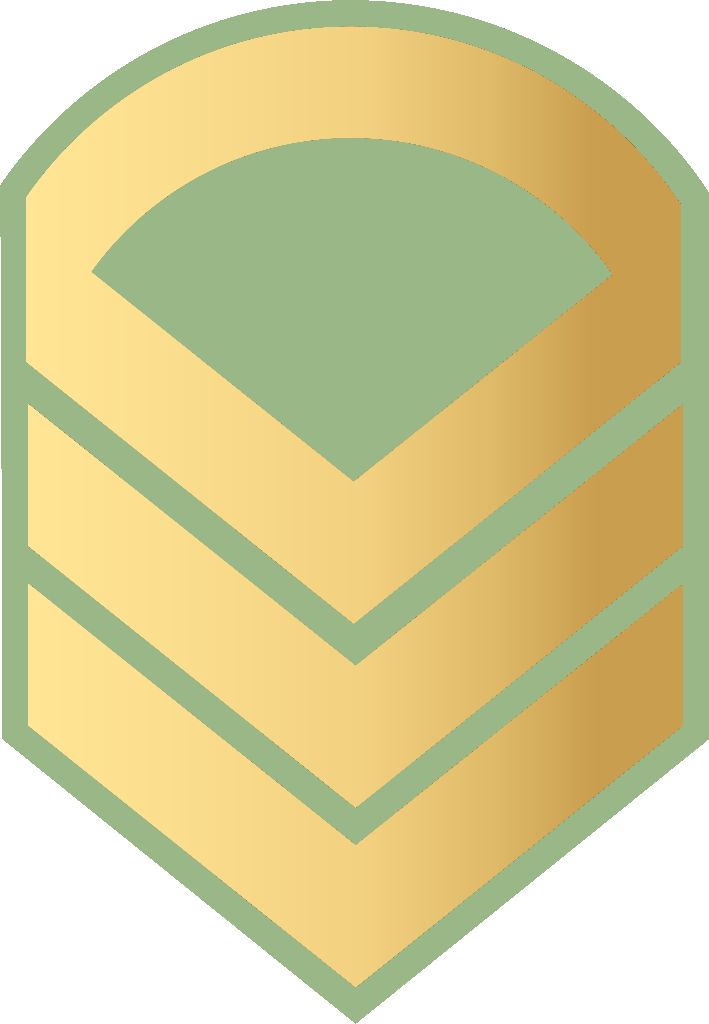
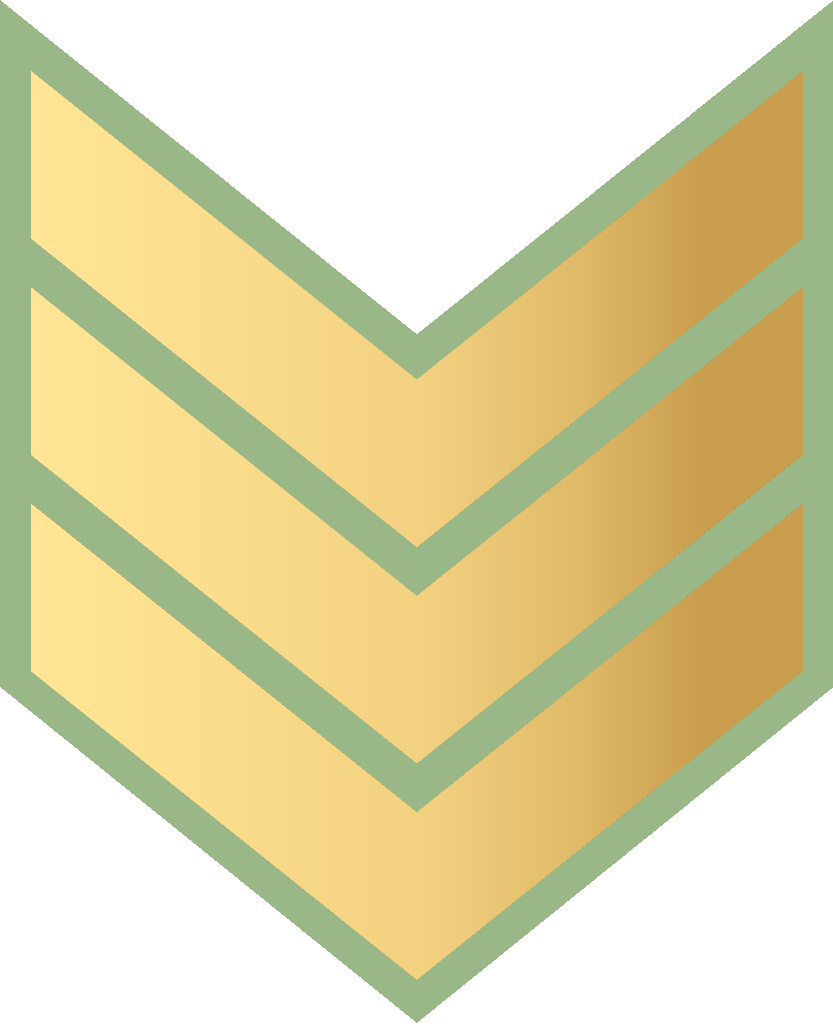
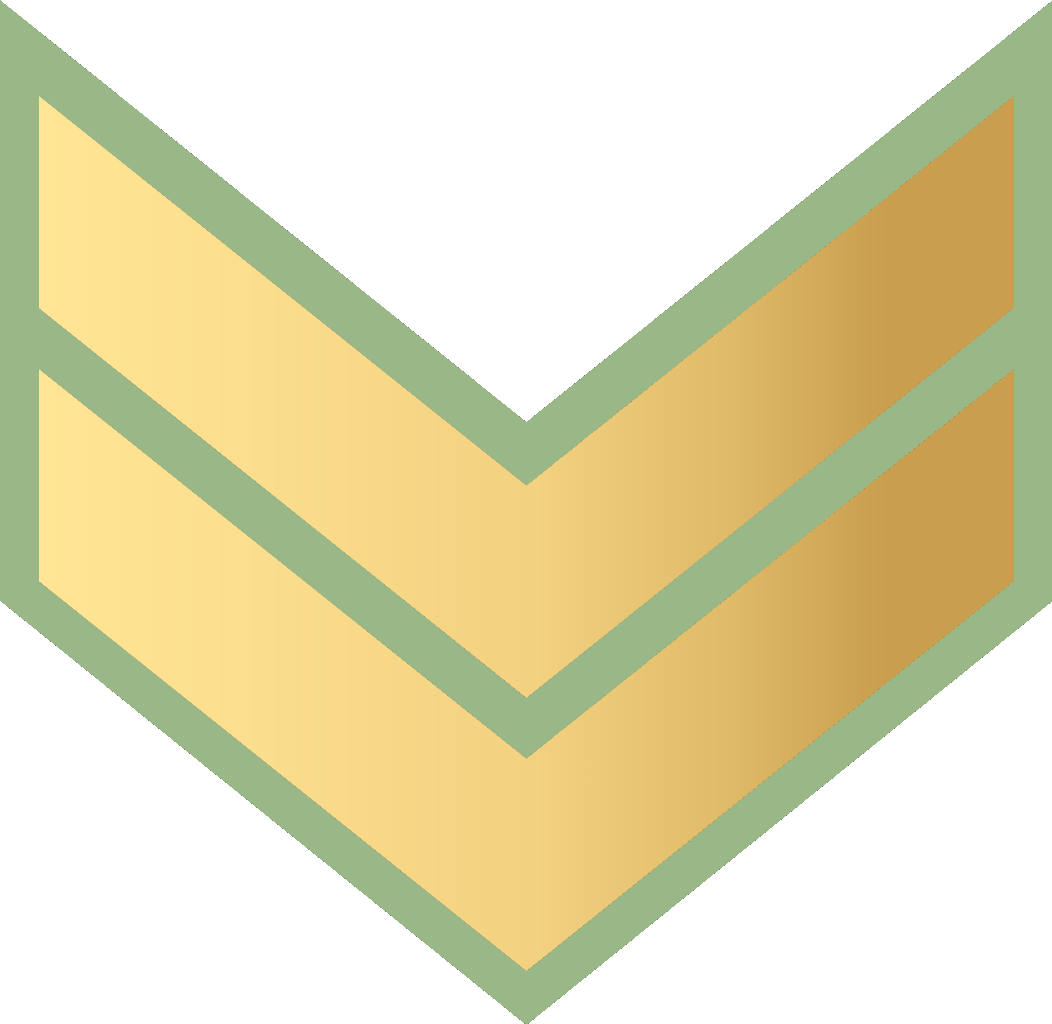
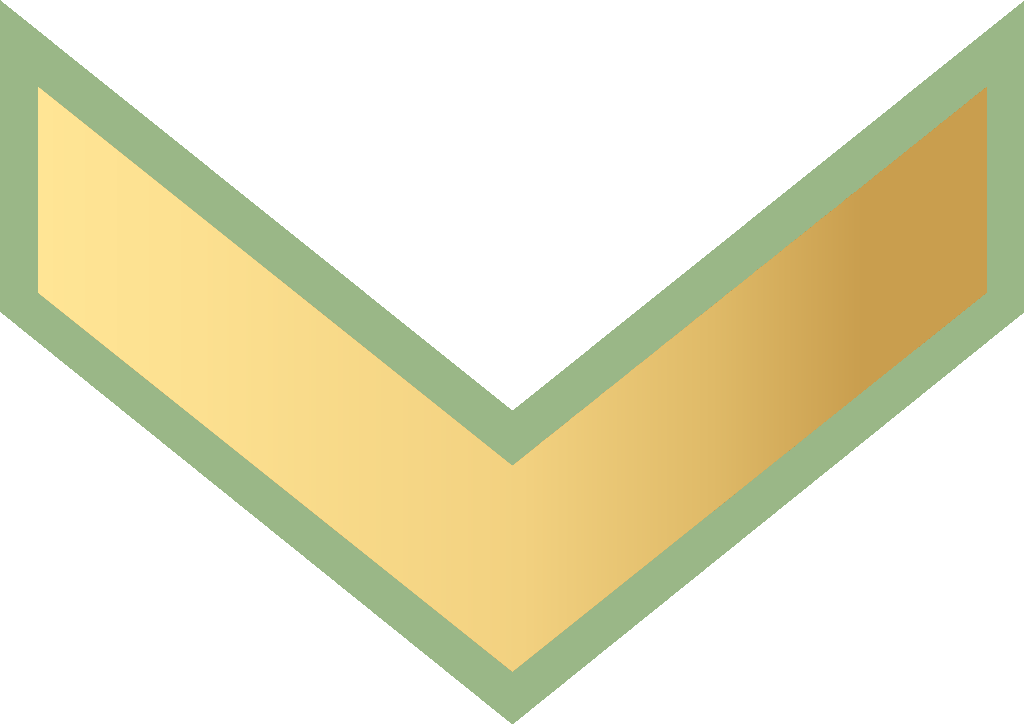
Rank group	Senior NCOs				Junior NCOs	Enlisted
Kuwait Army							No insignia
Kuwait Army	وكيل أول; Wakil 'awal	وكيل; Wakil	رقيب أول; Raqib 'awal	رقیب; Raqib	عريف; Earif	جندي أول; Jundiun awwal	جندي; Jundiun
Kuwait Navy							No insignia
Kuwait Navy	وكيل أول; Wakil 'awal	وكيل; Wakil	رقيب أول; Raqib 'awal	رقیب; Raqib	عريف; Earif	جندي أول; Jundiun awwal	جندي; Jundiun
Kuwait Air Force							No insignia
Kuwait Air Force	وكيل أول; Wakil 'awal	وكيل; Wakil	رقيب أول; Raqib 'awal	رقیب; Raqib	عريف; Earif	جندي أول; Jundiun awwal	جندي; Jundiun
Kuwait National Guard							No insignia
Kuwait National Guard	وكيل أول; Wakil 'awal	وكيل; Wakil	رقيب أول; Raqib 'awal	رقیب; Raqib	عريف; Earif	جندي أول; Jundiun awwal	جندي; Jundiun
Rank group	Senior NCOs				Junior NCOs	Enlisted
