= Soviet frigate Deyatelnyy =

Krivak-class frigate

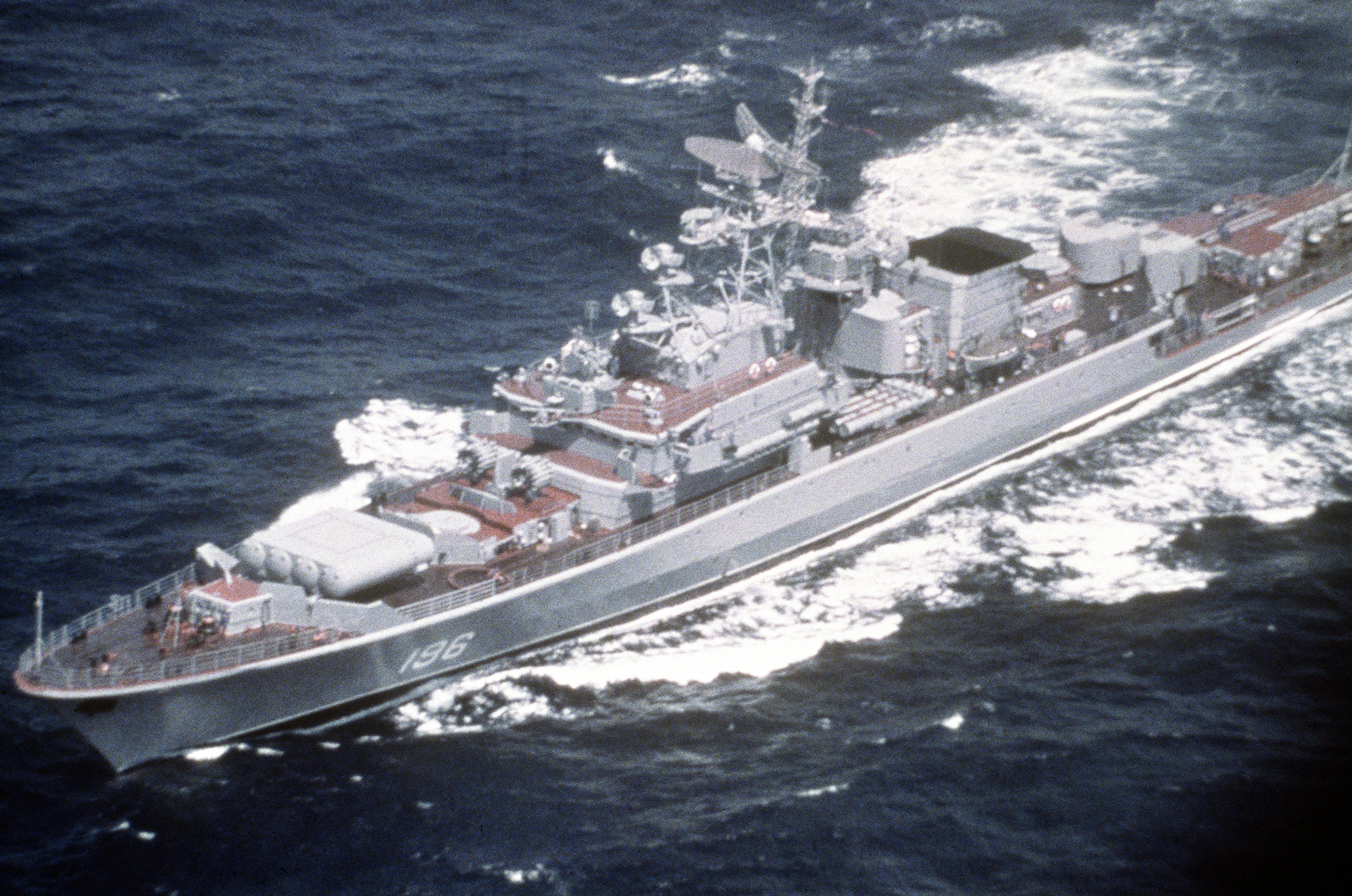
- Deyatelnyy in 1982.

History

Soviet Union
- Name: Deyatelnyy
- Namesake: Russian for Active
- Builder: Zalyv Shipbuilding yard, Kerch
- Yard number: 13
- Laid down: 21 June 1972
- Launched: 6 April 1975
- Commissioned: 25 December 1975
- Decommissioned: 10 July 1995
- Fate: Broken up

General characteristics
- Class & type: Project 1135 Burevestnik frigate
- Displacement: 2,810 t (2,770 long tons; 3,100 short tons) (standard); 3,200 t (3,100 long tons; 3,500 short tons) (full load)
- Length: 123 m (403 ft 7 in)
- Beam: 142 m (465 ft 11 in)
- Draft: 4.5 m (14 ft 9 in)
- Installed power: 48,000 shp (36,000 kW)
- Propulsion: 4 gas turbines; COGAG; 2 shafts
- Speed: 32 knots (59 km/h; 37 mph)
- Range: 3,950 nmi (7,315 km; 4,546 mi) at 14 knots (26 km/h; 16 mph)
- Complement: 23 officers, 174 men
- Sensors & processing systems: MR-310A Angara-A air/surface search radar; Volga and Don navigational radars; MG-332 Titan-2 and MG-325 Vega sonars
- Electronic warfare & decoys: PK-16 decoy-dispenser system
- Armament: 4 × URPK-3 Metel (SS-N-14 'Silex') anti-submarine missiles (1×4); 4 × ZIF-122 4K33 launchers (2×2) with 40 4K33 OSA-M (SA-N-4'Gecko') surface-to-air missiles; 4 × 76 mm (3 in) AK-726 guns (2×2); 2 × 45 mm (2 in) 21-KM guns (2×1); 2 × RBU-6000 Smerch-2 anti-submarine rockets; 8 × 533 mm (21 in) torpedo tubes (2×4); 18 mines

Deyatelnyy (Russian: Деятельный, "Active") was a Soviet Navy 1135 Burevestnik-class Large Anti-Submarine Ship (Большой Противолодочный Корабль, BPK) or Krivak-class frigate. Displacing 3,200 tonnes (3,100 long tons; 3,500 short tons) full load, the vessel was built around the Metel anti-submarine missile system. Launched on 6 April 1975, Deyatelnyy served with the Black Sea Fleet and, as well as Bulgaria in the Black Sea, spent the next two decades travelling as far as the Mediterranean Sea to visit ports in North Africa for cultural reasons and to improve relations between the Soviet Union and other nations, This was epitomised in 1981 when Deyatelnyy was the first Soviet vessel for more than ten years to visit Libya. In 1987, the ship was used to test a new missile for the Metel system that added anti-ship capability. Taken out of service for repair and modernisation in 1991, the vessel joined the Russian Navy with the dissolution of the Soviet Union that same year. However, lack of funding meant that, instead, Deyatelnyy was decommissioned on 10 June 1995 and broken up.

== Design and development ==
Deyatelnyy was one of twenty-one Project 1135 Burevestnik (Russian: Буревестник, "Petrel") class ships launched between 1970 and 1981. Project 1135 was envisaged by the Soviet Navy as a less expensive complement to the Project 1134A Berkut A (NATO reporting name 'Kresta II') and Project 1134B Berkut B (NATO reporting name 'Kara') classes of anti-submarine warfare ships. The design was originally given to TsKB-340, which had designed the earlier Project 159 (NATO reporting name 'Petya') and Project 35 (NATO reporting name 'Mirka') classes. However, the expansion in the United States Navy ballistic missile submarine fleet and the introduction of longer-ranged and more accurate submarine-launched ballistic missiles led the Soviet Navy to revisit the project to deal with the new threat. The work was transferred to TsKB-53 in Leningrad who produced a substantially larger and more capable design.

Created by N. P. Sobolov, Project 1135 combined a powerful missile armament with good seakeeping for a blue water role and shared the same BPK designation as the larger ships. This was amended to Guard Ship (Сторожевой Корабль, SKR) from 28 July 1977 to reflect the change in Soviet strategy of creating protected areas for friendly submarines close to the coast. NATO forces called the new class 'Krivak' class frigates.

Displacing 2,810 tonnes (2,770 long tons; 3,100 short tons) standard and 3,200 t (3,100 long tons; 3,500 short tons) full load, Deyatelnyy was 123 m (404 ft) long overall, with a beam of 14.2 m (46 ft 7 in) and a draught of 4.5 m (14 ft 9 in). Power was provided by two M7 sets, each consisting of a combination of a 18,000-shaft-horsepower (13,000 kW) DK59 and a 6,000 shp (4,500 kW) M62 gas turbine combined in a COGAG installation and driving one fixed-pitch propeller. Design speed was 32 knots (59 km/h; 37 mph) and range was 3,950 nautical miles (7,315 km; 4,546 mi) at 14 knots (26 km/h; 16 mph). The ship's complement was 197, including 23 officers.

=== Armament and sensors ===
Deyatelnyy initially had a primary mission of anti-submarine warfare and for this end was equipped with four URPK-3 Metel missiles (NATO reporting name SS-N-14 Silex), backed up by two quadruple torpedo tube mounts for 533 mm (21 in) torpedoes and a pair of 213 mm (8 in) RBU-6000 Smerch-2 anti-submarine rocket launchers. Defence against aircraft was provided by forty 4K33 OSA-M (SA-N-4 'Gecko') surface-to-air missiles which were launched from two sets of ZIF-122 launchers, each capable of launching two missiles. Two twin 76 mm (3 in) AK-726 guns were mounted aft and two single mounts for 45 mm (2 in) 21-KM guns were carried on the superstructure. Provision was made for carrying 18 mines.

Deyatelnyy had a well-equipped sensor suite, including a single MR-310A Angara-A air/surface search radar, Volga and Don-2 navigation radars, MP-401S Start-S ESM radar system and Spectrum-F laser warning system. An extensive sonar complex was fitted, including MG-332 Titan-2, which was mounted in a bow radome, and MG-325 Vega. The latter was a towed-array sonar specifically developed for the class and had a range of up to 15 km (9.3 mi; 8.1 nmi). The ship was also equipped with the PK-16 decoy-dispenser system.

== Construction and career ==
Deyatelnyy was laid down by Zalyv Shipbuilding yard in Kerch on 21 June 1972, the third of the class to be constructed by the shipbuilder, and was given the yard number 13. The vessel was named for a Russian word which can be translated active or energetic. Launched on 6 April 1975 and commissioned on 25 December that year, the ship joined the Black Sea Fleet, serving in the Black Sea, Mediterranean Sea and Atlantic Ocean. These international operations increasingly demonstrated the Soviet ability to operate as a blue-water navy.

Amongst the first missions for the ship was a visit to Tunis, Tunisia, between 30 June and 4 July 1977, where the crew engaged in cultural exchange. This proved just one of many opportunities that the crew had to engage with cities outside the Soviet Union into the following decade. Between 25 and 30 July 1981, the ship was to be found in Tripoli, Libya. This was designed to improve international relations and was the first time that a Soviet vessel had visited the country since 1970 and led to many similar exchanges, improving the relationship between the two nations.

After a main armament upgrade undertaken at Sevastopol Shipyard between 1984 and 1986, Deyatelnyy fired 24 of the new URPK-5 missiles off the coast of Feodosia against surface and underwater targets between March and June 1987. As well as travelling at a higher speed, the missile provided a new anti-ship capability for the class. Between 11 and 15 August 1989, the vessel spent time in Varna, Bulgaria. In October 1991, Deyatelnyy sailed to Sevastopol to be repaired, and was there at the time of the dissolution of the Soviet Union on 26 December 1991 when the ship was to be transferred to the Russian Navy. However, lack of funding instead meant that the ship was decommissioned on 10 June 1995 and left Sevastopol to be broken up by a Turkish company on 6 April 1997.
