= Mubarraz-class fast attack craft =

1990 United Arab Emirates Navy ship class

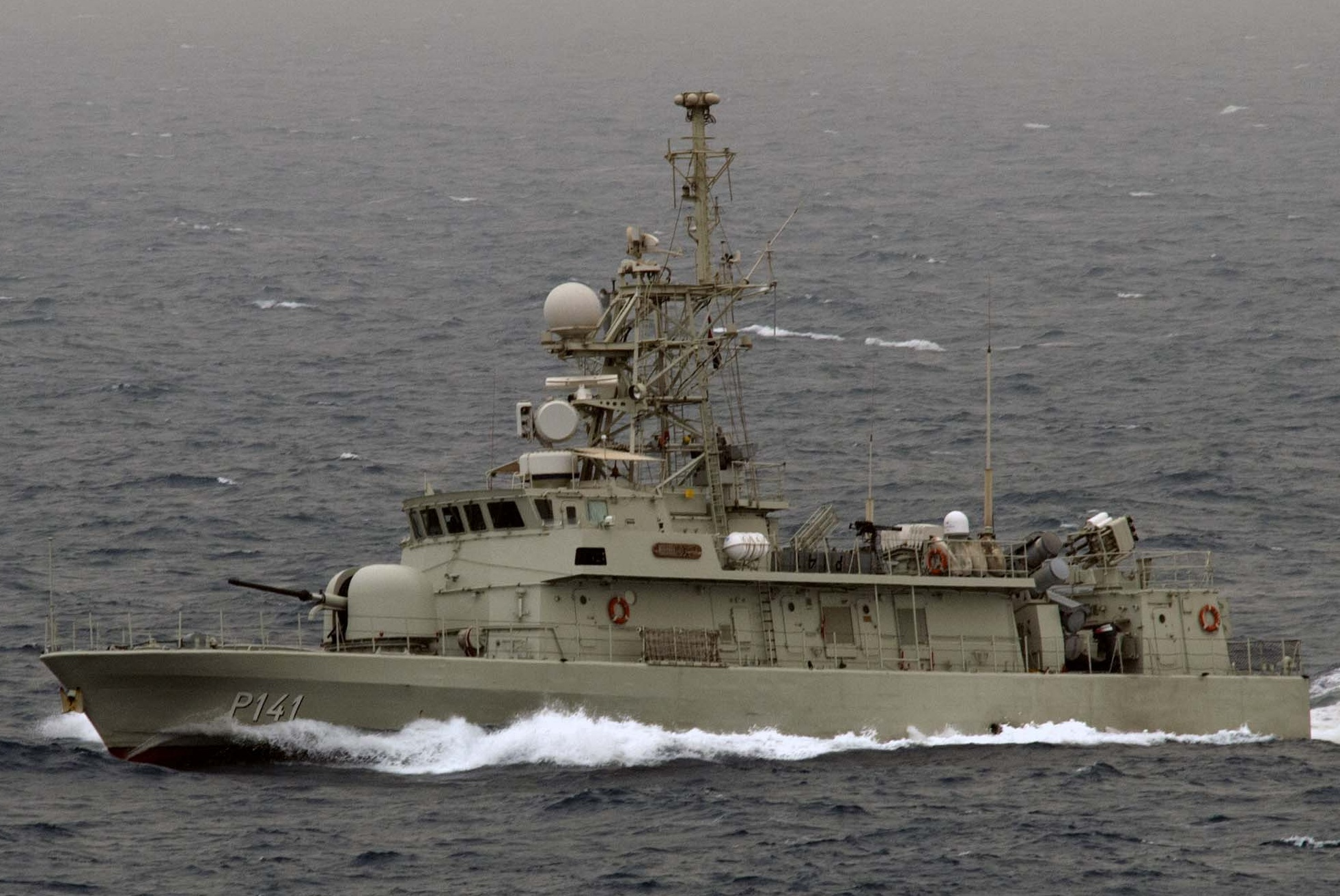
- Mubarraz at the IMCMEX 13 exercise in May 2013

Class overview
- Builders: Lürssen, Bremen
- Operators: United Arab Emirates
- Preceded by: Type TNC 45 fast attack craft
- Built: 1980s
- In commission: 1990–present
- Completed: 2
- Active: 2

General characteristics
- Type: Fast attack craft
- Displacement: 235 tonnes (231 long tons) full load
- Length: 44 m (144 ft 4 in) oa
- Beam: 7 m (23 ft 0 in)
- Draught: 2.2 m (7 ft 3 in)
- Propulsion: 2 MTU 20V 538 TB93 diesel engines
- Speed: 40 knots (74 km/h)
- Range: 500 nautical miles (930 km) at 38 knots (70 km/h)
- Complement: 5 officers, 35 enlisted
- Sensors & processing systems: Bofors Ericsson Sea Giraffe 50HC, Racal Decca 1226 (navigation), Bofors Electronic 9LV 223 (fire control)
- Electronic warfare & decoys: Thales Cutlass ESM, Thales Cygnus ECM, 2 Dagaie IR/chaff launchers
- Armament: 4 Aérospatiale MM 40 Exocet anti-ship missiles; 1 Matra Sadral sextuple launcher for Mistral surface-to-air missiles; 1 OTO Melara 76 mm Super Rapid

The Mubarraz class, also known as the Type TPB 45 or FPB 44, is a class of two fast attack craft built for the United Arab Emirates Navy in the late 1980s and commissioned in 1990. They are armed with four MM 40 Exocet anti-ship missiles, a Sadral surface-to-air missile launcher and a 76-millimetre (3.0 in) gun.

== Background ==
The United Arab Emirates Navy was formed in 1978. In late 1986, the force ordered two additional fast attack craft from Lürssen of West Germany to an improved design over their existing Type TNC 45 fast attack craft. (Note: Baker has the two ships ordered in mid 1987.) The new design was designated TPB 45 or FPB 44 by Lürssen. The units are tasked with patrolling territorial waters and oil platforms.

== Design and description ==
The vessels measure 44 metres (144 ft 4 in) long overall and 41.5 metres (136 ft 2 in) between perpendiculars with a beam of 7 metres (23 ft 0 in) and a draught of 2.2 metres (7 ft 3 in) over the propellers. The ships had a standard displacement of 210 tonnes (210 long tons) and 235 tonnes (231 long tons) at full load. The ships are powered by two MTU 20V 538 TB93 diesel engines turning two propellers creating 10,200 brake horsepower (7,600 kW) with a maximum speed of 40 knots (74 km/h; 46 mph). (Note: Baker has the top speed at 34 knots (63 km/h; 39 mph), but gives them a range of 500 nautical miles (930 km; 580 mi) at 38 knots (70 km/h; 44 mph).) The vessels have a range of 500 nautical miles (930 km; 580 mi) at 40 knots (74 km/h; 46 mph) or 1,600 nautical miles (3,000 km; 1,800 mi) at 16 knots (30 km/h; 18 mph). The ships are crewed by 40 sailors including 5 officers.

The fast attack craft are armed with two twin Exocet anti-ship missile launchers and one Sadral sextuple launcher for the Mistral surface-to-air missiles. The Mubarraz class also mounts one OTO Melara 76 mm Super Rapid dual purpose gun. A second gun mount was replaced by the Sadral system. The Mubarraz class were the first export of the Sadral/Mistral system outside of France. The Exocet launchers are situated in a break in the superstructure. The vessels are equipped with TM 1229 navigation radar, Sea Giraffe 50 air/surface search radar, and 9GA 331 fire control radar. The Sadral system is controlled by the Najir optronic director situated abaft the mast. The fast attack craft were given enhanced early warning systems and a Cutlass ROL-2 intercept system and a Cygnus jammer, which were mounted on the mast. The ships mount two Dagaie chaff launchers.

== Units ==
Mubarraz class construction data
Number	Name	Shipyard	Commissioned	Status
P141	Mubarraz	Lürssen, Bremen	August 1990	In service
P142	Makasib	Lürssen, Bremen	August 1990	In service
