= Falaj 3-class patrol boat =

Class of missile boats for the United Arab Emirates

Class overview
- Builders: Abu Dhabi Ship Building
- Operators: United Arab Emirates Navy
- Preceded by: Falaj 2-class patrol vessel
- Planned: 4
- Completed: 1

General characteristics
- Type: Patrol boat
- Displacement: 680 tonnes
- Length: 62.7 m (206 ft)
- Beam: 9.5 m (31 ft)
- Draught: 3.4 m (11 ft)
- Propulsion: 4 x diesel engines,
- Speed: 25 knots (46 km/h; 29 mph)
- Range: 2,000 nmi (3,700 km; 2,300 mi)
- Complement: 39

The Falaj 3 class (sometimes also known as the Altaf class after the lead ship) are four offshore patrol vessels (later reclassified as missile boats) built by the Abu Dhabi Ship Building (ADSB) for the United Arab Emirates Navy. The design of the boats is claimed to reduce their radar cross section (RCS) and infrared and acoustic signatures.

== Description ==
The Falaj 3 class is based on the Fearless-class patrol vessel currently used by the Republic of Singapore Navy after a contract was awarded to ST Engineering in November 2021 for the design of the vessels and technical assistance during construction.

The boats are equipped with what the manufacturer describes as four "high power engines" using four propellers for a claimed speed in excess of 25 knots. It has four generators capable of producing 1.2 Megawatts of power.

Although the manufacturer has not disclosed the details of its combat-management system and weapons fit, EDR (European Defense Review) Magazine has identified many of the systems employed. These include the ATHENA C Mk2 CMS by Leonardo, Kelvin Hughes navigation radars, the Kronos Naval 3D multifunction radar, a SPYNEL InfraRed Search & Track suite and the NA-30S Mk2 dual-band radar/electro-optical fire control system for its main gun.

EDR Magazine reports the class is armed with a OTO Melara 76mm main gun, an 8-cell VLS for MBDA VL MICA surface-to-air missiles, a Raytheon Mk 49 RAM launcher for RIM-116 missiles and launchers for Halcon LOGIR missiles.

== Ships of class ==
The first ship of the class, Altaf (P 163) was commissioned in February 2025 less than two years after the first steel was cut for it in December 2023.
