= Baynunah-class corvette =

Class of UAE Navy corvettes

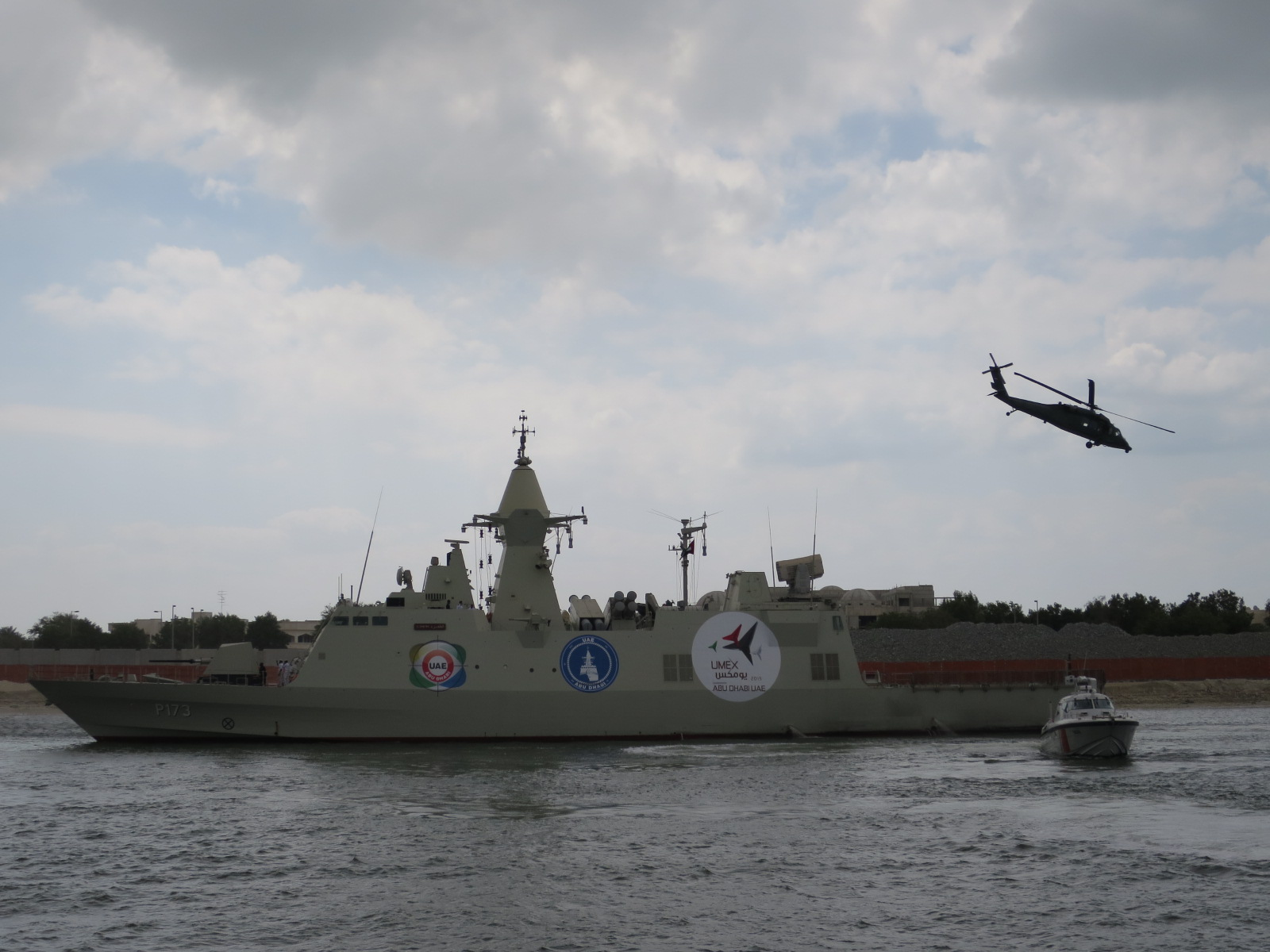
- Baynunah-class corvette Al Dhafra at NAVDEX, February 2015

Class overview
- Builders: Constructions Mécaniques de Normandie (lead ship only); Abu Dhabi Ship Building
- Operators: United Arab Emirates Navy Angolan Navy
- Preceded by: Ardhana-class patrol craft
- Planned: 9
- Building: 3
- Completed: 6
- Active: 6

General characteristics
- Type: Corvette
- Displacement: 915 tons
- Length: 71.3 m (233 ft 11 in)
- Beam: 11 m (36 ft 1 in)
- Draft: 2.8 m (9 ft 2 in)
- Propulsion: 4 × MTU 12V595 TE90 diesel engines; 3 × Kamewa Waterjets models 112S11 and 125B11
- Speed: 30 knots (56 km/h; 35 mph)+
- Range: 2,400 nmi (4,400 km; 2,800 mi) at 15 knots (28 km/h; 17 mph)
- Endurance: 14 days
- Complement: 37
- Sensors & processing systems: Saab Microwave Systems Sea Giraffe AMB surveillance radar; Terma I-band navigation radar; Selex Orion RTN 25 Fire Control X-band radar; NDS 3070 Vanguard hull-mounted mine and obstacle avoidance sonar
- Armament: 1 × OTO Melara 76 mm/62 caliber naval gun; 2 × Rheinmetall MLG 27 27 mm guns; 4 × Mk 56 dual-pack VLS with 8 × RIM-162 ESSM; 1 × Mk 49 mod3 21-cell RAM launcher for RAM block 1A missile system; 8 × MBDA MM40 block 3 Exocet missiles
- Aviation facilities: Aft helicopter deck and hangar
- Notes: Cost, as of February 2009, is US$820 million for the entire 6 ship programme.

The Baynunah class are corvettes for the United Arab Emirates Navy (UAE Navy). The lead ship, Baynunah, is named after the Baynunah region in Abu Dhabi. Six ships were built for this class at a total price of US$820 million.

== Description ==
This class is based on the CMN Group's Combattante BR70 design. The Baynunah class is designed for "patrol and surveillance, minelaying, interception and other anti-surface warfare operations in the United Arab Emirate's territorial waters and exclusive economic zone."

== Export ==
=== Angola ===
Abu Dhabi Ship Building (ADSB) has signed a EUR 1 Bn contract with Angola to supply a fleet of three BR71 MKII corvettes to the Angolan Navy, parent company EDGE Group announced at IDEX 2023 on 20 February 2023.

== History ==
In 2004, to replace the Ardhana-class patrol craft, the United Arab Emirates' Ministry of Defence awarded a contract to Abu Dhabi Ship Building for the Baynunah class. The lead ship, Baynunah, was built in France by Constructions Mécaniques de Normandie, while the rest are being built in the UAE by Abu Dhabi Ship Building (ADSB).

The lead ship was launched on 25 June 2009. Sea trials commenced in January 2010..

The fourth ship of the class, Mezyad, was launched by ADSB on 15 February 2012. ADSB hoped to secure further orders for the class from the Saudi and Kuwaiti navies, however Saudi and Kuwaiti interest has since been lost.

The last ship, Al-Hili, was launched on 6 February 2014.

During the Saudi Arabian-led intervention in the Yemeni Civil War, a number of the class took part in a naval blockade of Yemen.

== Ships ==
Number	Pennant No	Name	Builder	Launched	Commissioned	Status
1	P171	Baynunah	CMN, Cherbourg	25 June 2009	2011	In Service
2	P172	Al Hesen	ADSB, Abu Dhabi	2010	2012	In Service
3	P173	Al Dhafra	ADSB, Abu Dhabi	April 2011	24 December 2013	In Service
4	P174	Mezyad	ADSB, Abu Dhabi	15 February 2012	2014	In Service
5	P175	Al Jahili	ADSB, Abu Dhabi	2013	April 2015	In Service
6	P176	Al Hili	ADSB, Abu Dhabi	6 February 2014	20 February 2017	In Service

== See also ==
- Braunschweig-class corvette
- Milgem-class corvette
- Sa'ar 5-class corvette
- Reshef-class corvette
- Visby-class corvette
