= Ardhana-class patrol craft =

1975 UAE Navy ship class

Class overview
- Builders: VT Group (formerly Vosper Thornycroft), UK
- Operators: United Arab Emirates
- Built: 1970s
- In commission: 1975-present
- Completed: 6
- Active: 6

General characteristics
- Type: Patrol boat
- Displacement: 110 tons (standard), 175 tons (full load)
- Length: 110 ft (34 m)
- Draft: 6 ft 6 in (1.98 m)
- Propulsion: 2 Paxman 12CM diesels
- Speed: 30 knots (56 km/h)
- Range: 1,800 nautical miles (3,300 km) at 14 knots (26 km/h)
- Complement: 26
- Sensors & processing systems: Racal Decca TM 1626 radar
- Armament: 2 Oerlikon/BMARC 30 mm/75 A32 (twin), 1 Oerlikon/BMARC 20 mm/80 A41A

The Ardhana class is a class of patrol boat that was built for the United Arab Emirates Navy in the early 1970s and commissioned in 1975. The six vessels were the largest craft in the UAE fleet at the time of the unification of its armed forces in 1976. The vessels mounted 30mm cannon and these remained the heaviest weapon in the navy's arsenal until the acquisition of Exocet missiles in 1980. A decision was announced in 2004 that the that Ardhana class will be decommissioned and replaced by the Baynunah-class corvette.

== Units ==
- P3301 Ardhana
- P3302 Zurara
- P3303 Murban
- P3304 Al Ghullan
- P3305 Radoom
- P3306 Ghanadhah
