= United Arab Emirates Navy =

Naval warfare branch of the United Arab Emirates' military

- البحرية الامارات العربية المتحدة
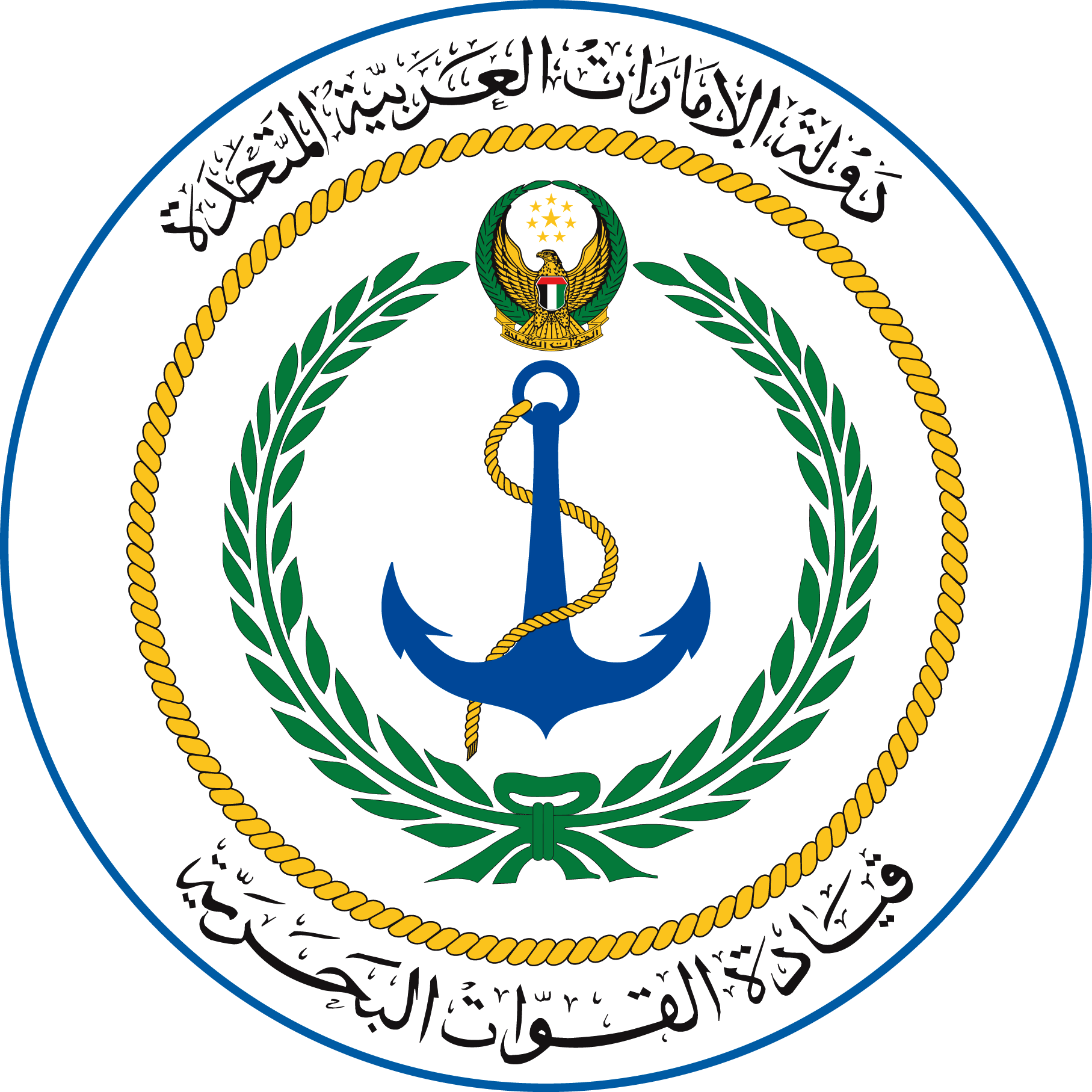
- Founded: 1971
- Country: United Arab Emirates
- Branch: Navy
- Role: Naval warfare
- Size: 3,000 personnel
- Part of: United Arab Emirates Armed Forces
- Garrison/HQ: Abu Dhabi
- Equipment: 11 corvette 4 Offshore patrol vessel 4 (u/c); 34 patrol craft 2 Minehunter; 31 Landing craft

Insignia
- Ensign

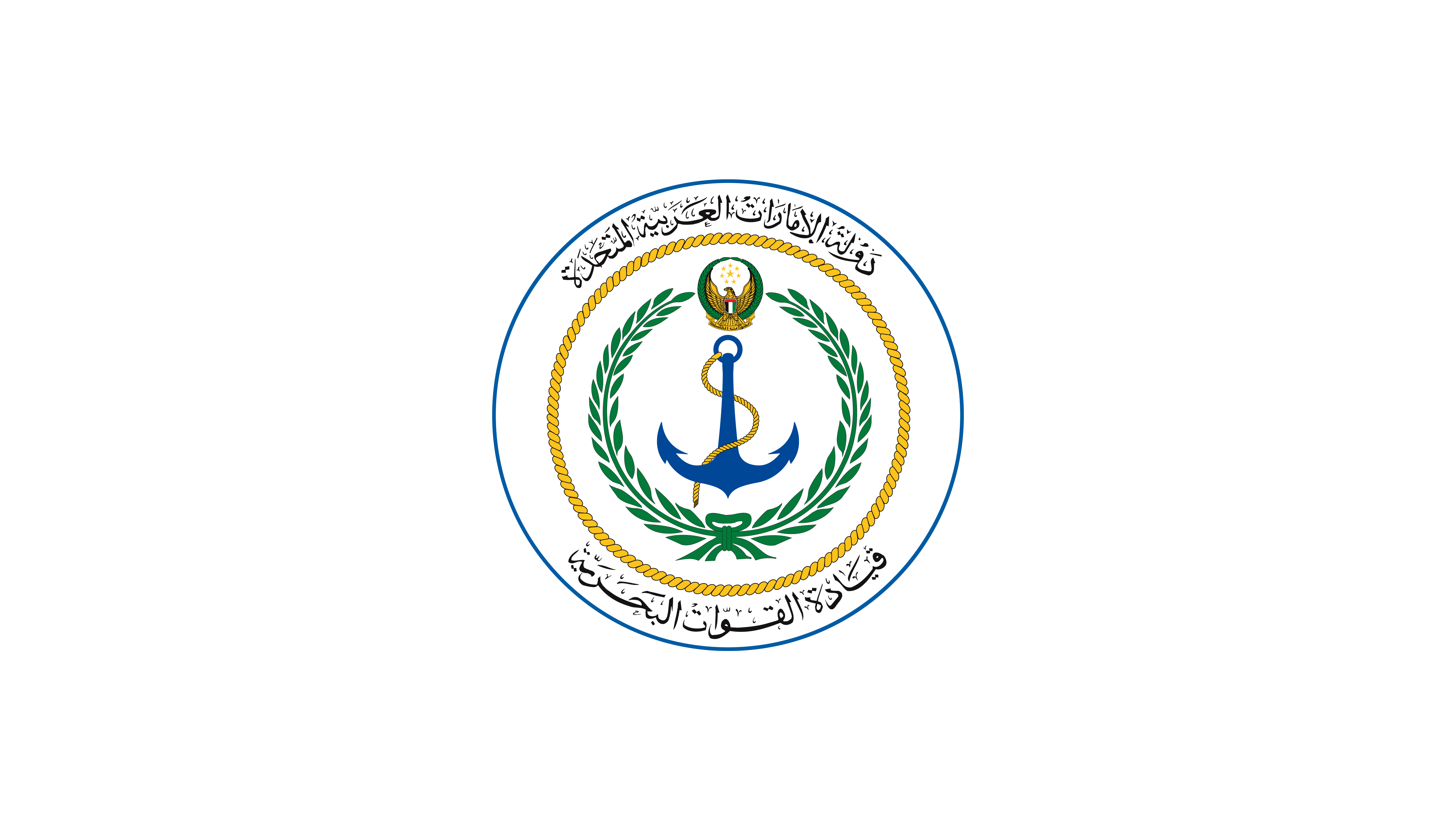
- Flag

The United Arab Emirates Navy (UAEN) is the naval branch of the United Arab Emirates Armed Forces. It is a small force of about 3,000 personnel. While its primary role is monitoring and defending the nation's territorial waters, ensuring regional freedom of navigation, and protecting commercial sea routes, it is expanding its role to include blue-water capabilities.

== History ==
The origins of the UAE Navy begin with the Abu Dhabi Defence Force (ADDF), which established a Sea Wing in 1967. The initial fleet gave Abu Dhabi a limited brown-water patrolling and protecting capability in the waters of the Persian Gulf and in the littoral region of the Northern Emirates in the Gulf of Oman. This included protection of the UAE's significant offshore oil and gas facilities.

With the formation of the United Arab Emirates on 2 December 1971 and the unification of the UAE Armed Forces on 6 May 1976, the ADDF Sea Wing became the UAE Navy and continued to expand with naval facilities at Abu Dhabi port in 1975 as well as other facilities at the far west of Abu Dhabi Emirate and on the eastern coast of Fujairah at Khor Fakkan.

The Iran-Iraq War (1980–1988) and especially the 1986 'tanker war' in the Persian Gulf culminated in the 25 November 1986 attack of Abu Dhabi's Abu Al Bukhoosh offshore oil platforms by Iranian aircraft. These incidents led to further expansion of the UAE's Navy assets in this period. The 1990s and 2000s saw further consolidation. In 2001, the UAE Coast Guard, which had been under the control of the UAE Ministry of Interior since 1976, was transferred to the control of the Navy. This change was likely in response to increased concern over the possibility of terrorist attacks on critical infrastructure in the UAE's littoral zone and on its islands in the post-9/11 world, and the effectiveness of the Coast Guard in countering this threat. Another change in the Navy's force structure in the 2000s was the expansion of its amphibious capability and the formation of the UAE Navy Marines (subsequently merged with the UAE Presidential Guard).

Since 2015, the UAE Navy has been operating in the Yemen region in response to the Civil War there.

== Equipment ==
=== Vessels ===
Class	Type	Photo	Origin	Number of Ships	Notes
Corvette
Bani Yas-class	corvette		France	2	2 ships ordered on 25 March 2019 from Naval Group; 2,700 tonnes, 102 m (335 ft); Propulsion: CODAD; Speed: 25 knots (46 km/h; 29 mph); 1 × OTO Melara 76 mm main gun 2 × Nexter Narwhal 20mm cannon 16 x VLS VL MICA NG; 1 x RAM (PDMS); 8 × Exocet anti ship missile 2 × triple torpedo launcher for MU90 Impact
Abu Dhabi-class	corvette		Italy	1	1,650 tons, 88m length 1 × Otobreda 76 mm Super Rapid gun 2 × remote controlled 30 mm guns 4 × MM40 Block 3 Exocet anti-ship missiles 2 × triple torpedo launcher 1 helicopter carried.
Banynunah-class	corvette		France	6	930 tons, 71m length 1 × Otobreda 76 mm Super Rapid gun 2 × Rheinmetall MLG 27 27 mm guns 1 x RAM (PDMS); 8 × RIM-162 ESSM in VLS; 8 × MM40 Block 3 Exocet anti-ship missiles 1 AS-565 helo (based on the CMN Group's Combattante BR70 design).
Muray-Jib	corvette		Germany	2	630 tons, 63m length 1 × 76 mm 1 × 30 mm gun 1 × 8 Crotale SAM; 8 × MM-40 SSM; 1 SA 316 Helicopter
Offshore patrol vessel
Falaj 3-class patrol vessel	Offshore patrol vessel		Singapore	1+(3) ordered	Four Falaj 3 ordered in May 2021. Based on Fearless-class patrol vessel built by Singapore Technologies (ST) Marine.
Falaj 2-class patrol vessel	Offshore patrol vessel		Italy	2	550 tons, 55.7m length 1 x Otobreda 76 mm 2 x 12.7 machine gun in hitrole RWS; 6 x VLS for VL MICA; 2 × twin launcher for MM40 Exocet block iii
Arialah class	Offshore patrol vessel		Netherlands; United Arab Emirates	2	67m length 1 x 57mm 2 x 30mm guns 1 × RAM (PDMS)
Fast attack craft
Mubarraz class	fast attack craft		Germany	2	260 tons full load / 44.9 metres length / commissioned 1990; 1 × 76 mm 2 × 40 mm guns 1 × 6 Mistral SAM; 4 × MM-40 SSM
Ban-Yas (Lürssen TNC-45)	fast attack craft		Germany	6	TNC 45 fast attack craft - 260 tons full load / 44.9 metres length / commissioned 1980- Will be upgraded to Mubarraz class 1 × 76 mm 2 × 40 mm guns 4 × MM-40 Block III SSM
Ardhana class	patrol craft		United Kingdom	6	175 tons full load — commissioned 1975–6
Unknown	patrol craft			20	4 tons
Minehunter
Frankenthal class	minehunter		Germany	2	1 damaged by Houthi attack
Amphibious warfare ship
Makassar class LPD	Landing platform dock		Indonesia	0+(1) ordered	Building a variant of its own
Al-Quwaisat-class LST	Landing ship tank		Malaysia	3	
Unknown	Landing ship tank			7	
Unknown	Landing Craft Utility			5	
Unknown	Landing Craft Utility			4	
Ghannatha	Landing crafts			12	Will be upgraded to Gnannatha Phase II class

=== Leased ===
- HSV-2 Swift - Sub-leased or transferred from the UAE's National Marine Dredging Company sometime early in 2015. Used for logistics and related activities as part of the ongoing Saudi Arabian-led intervention in Yemen, including reportedly in support of amphibious operations. This ship was directly hit by a Houthi missile attack and severely damaged during operations in October 2016.

== Naval bases ==
The UAE Navy has several naval bases:

- Ghantoot Naval base
- Jabel Ali Naval Base

== Future navy ==
12 Ghannatha Phase II-class fast missile landing crafts were commissioned up to 2014. The first unit was launched in July 2012. Another 12 were upgraded from Ghannatha Phase I class 4 Falaj 2 class patrol vessel (based on the Italian Diciotti class) are on order, 2 being outfitted with 550 tons - 4 MM-40 Exocets - 6 Mica VL SAM (with an additional 4 to be produced in the future, for a total of 8). One 26m offshore patrol vessel, one 24m amphibious troop transport vessel, and one 24m patrol vessel are under construction for the UAE Navy. On 1 July 2022, the United Arab Emirates Navy signed a Memorandum of Understanding with PT PAL Indonesia to purchase a 163-meter version of the Makassar-class Landing Platform Dock, with construction scheduled to begin in 2024. The first steel-cutting ceremony for the Landing Platform Dock 163M, also known as the Al Maryah Project, took place on 28 February 2024.

== See also ==
- UAE Armed Forces
