= Falaj 2-class patrol vessel =

UAE naval inshore stealth patrol

Class overview
- Builders: Fincantieri
- Operators: United Arab Emirates Navy
- Planned: 4
- Completed: 2

General characteristics
- Type: Patrol boat
- Displacement: 550 tonnes
- Length: 55.7 m (182 ft 9 in)
- Beam: 8.8 m (28 ft 10 in)
- Draught: 2.8 m (9 ft 2 in)
- Propulsion: 2 × MTU diesels 16V 4000 M90 (2,720 kW each), 4 × Isotta Fraschini generators
- Speed: >20 knots
- Complement: 28 officers and crew
- Sensors & processing systems: command and control system IPN-S (SELEX Sistemi Integrati); radar/electro-optical FCS NA-30S (SELEX Sistemi Integrati); 3D multifunction radar KRONOS 3D NV (SELEX Sistemi Integrati); secondary radar SIR-M (SELEX Sistemi Integrati); electro-optical director Medusa MK4B
- Electronic warfare & decoys: 2 × self-defence decoy system MASS (Multi Ammunition Soft-kill System) (Rheinmetall); 1 × Seal-L electronic warfare system (Elettronica)
- Armament: 1 × OTO Melara 76 mm/62 super rapido stealth mount; 2 × twin launcher MBDA MM40 block 3 Exocet missiles; 2 × trio vertical launch units MBDA VL MICA SAM; 2 × 12.7 mm machine guns OTO Melara Hitrole-G (remotized)

The Falaj 2 class are patrol boats of the United Arab Emirates Navy classified as stealth inshore patrol vessels (IPVs).

== Description ==
The Falaj 2 class is based on the Italian Diciotti-class offshore patrol vessel, in use with the Italian Coast Guard. The Diciotti class is based itself on the earlier experimental Saettia class, a missile attack boat demonstrator designed and built by Fincantieri. The specifications require a highly flexible and versatile vessel to carry out a wide range of missions, from patrol and surveillance operations over attacks against both targets at sea and on land in national and international scenarios up to self-defence against threats from the air or surface. A special feature of the vessels is their particular stealth geometry to ensure their reduced radar detect ability.

== History ==
The contract for Falaj 2-class vessels was signed 2009, according to other sources 2010. It included the option for two more vessels to be built by Etihad Ship Building, a newly established joint venture based in Abu Dhabi between Fincantieri of Italy and the local firms Melara Middle East and Al Fattan Ship Industry. The technology transfer is part of the order.

In May 2021 it was announced that Abu Dhabi Ship Building (ADSB) was assigned with the building of four Falaj-3 offshore patrol vessels for the UAE navy.

== Ships ==
Number	Pennant no	Name	Builder	Launched	Commissioned	Fleet	Home port	Status
1	P251	Ganthoot	La Spezia	25 January 2012	8 January 2013	unknown	unknown	In Service
2	P252	Salahah	La Spezia	8 June 2012	22 April 2013	unknown	unknown	In Service

== Variants ==
At the beginning of June 2020, there were media reports in context of the sale of the two Bergamini-class FREMM frigates Spartaco Schergat and Emilio Bianchi to Egypt, according to which Egypt is also to receive 20 patrol boats modelled on the Falaj-2 class as part of a large package.
