= Al-Mutairi =

Almutairi, Al-Mutairi, Al-Mutayri or Al Mutairi (Arabic: المطيري) is an Arabic nisba surname originating in the Arabian Peninsula that is given to members of the Mutayr Bedouin tribe, that may refer to:

- Abdullah Al-Mutairi (born 1986), Saudi football player
- Adah Almutairi, American scholar, inventor, and entrepreneur
- Ahmad Almutairi (born 1994), Kuwaiti para-sport athlete
- Dhari Almutairi, Kuwaiti para-sport athlete
- Fuaad Al-Mutairi (born 1986), Saudi football player
- Helal Al-Mutairi (1855–1938), Kuwaiti businessman and politician
- Hussein Quwaian Al-Mutairi, member of the Kuwaiti National Assembly
- Khalid Abdullah Mishal al Mutairi, Kuwaiti charity worker
- Mashfi Al-Mutairi (born 1973), Kuwaiti sport shooter
- Meshaal Al-Mutairi, Saudi Arabian football player
- Mohammed Hayef al-Mutairi, member of the Kuwaiti National Assembly
- Mubarak Al-Mutairi, member of the Kuwaiti National Assembly
- Nawaf Al-Mutairi (born 1982), Kuwaiti football player
- Nawaf Al-Mutairi (handballer) (born 1989), Saudi Arabian handball player
- Radhi Al-Mutairi (born 1991), Saudi football player
- Rija Hujailan Al-Mutairi, member of the Kuwaiti National Assembly
- Saeed Al-Mutairi (born 1968), Saudi Arabian sport shooter
- Zaid Al-Mutairi (born 1982), Kuwaiti sport shooter
- Zeid Bin Mutlaq Al-Ja'ba Al-Dewish Al-Mutairi (died 2004), co-founder of Al-Nassr Football Club in Saudi Arabia

== See also ==
- Al-Mutairi (tribe)
