= Architecture of Kuwait =

Kuwaiti architecture is a style of architecture unique to Kuwait, a country founded in the early 18th century. Before the discovery of oil, Kuwait has an economy reliant on maritime trade, shipbuilding, caravan trade and the pearl industry. The economy improved by the discovery of oil, enabling more economic growth.

== History ==
Kuwait City was surrounded by a wall with five gates in the 18th century, but it was demolished when the new masterplan was implemented in 1952. Apart from the city wall, Kuwait was protected by two forts: one in the city, and the other one at Jahra known as the "Red Fort".

Kuwait's traditional building materials were stone collected from the sea or rubble stone covered with thick mud plaster, mud brick and sometimes Cora stone. Wood was rare, though mangrove poles imported from East Africa were used for roofs, as were some other few select woods from India. Early Kuwaiti architecture was relatively simple and intuitive, with a focus on maintaining the privacy of the house. Houses had simple and basic exterior designs, and most artistic touches were found on main doors and windows. These houses having to accommodate the communal and tight-knit nature of Kuwaiti society were divided into separate quarters accommodating different members of one family, usually the male children of the owner of the house and their wives. It is common to find central courts, as is the case in other Arab countries, that served as a gathering place for the families. Some families, often those that were more affluent, would have multiple courtyards and their houses would also be larger.

Later, during the 18th century, a typical Kuwait merchant house was built in the Ottoman style that reached the city from Basra. Ottoman features included projecting wooden balconies enclosed with wooden screens or mashrabiya and covered wooden doorways which sometimes included European motifs. The extreme heat of the city made wind catchers and ventilation a necessity for most houses. Thus, some houses installed wind catchers. Lewis Pelly, a Political Resident, described Kuwait in the 1860s as:

A clean, active town, with a broad and open main bazaar, and numerous solid stone dwelling houses stretching along this strand and containing some 20,000 inhabitants, attracting Arab and Persian merchants from all quarters by the equity of its rule and by the freedom of its trade.

Within the city, there were a number of mosques, most of which have been rebuilt several times. The oldest mosques in Kuwait are the Alkhamis Mosque, built between 1772 and 1773, and the Abd AlRazzag Mosque built in 1797. Before the 9th century, minarets were rare, consisting of small square towers covered with small roof canopies.

In 1952, the British planning firm of Minorprio, Spenceley and MacFarlane were hired to design the first master plan of Kuwait. The plan was based loosely on Ebenezer Howard's Garden City and the firms experience with New Towns.

Modern architecture in Kuwait is mostly in the International style, although there are several buildings that demonstrate a relationship with Middle Eastern themes. One of the most well known examples of Kuwaiti modern architecture is the water towers, consisting of tall pointed conical spires above a spherical water tank. Kuwait Towers is also considered Kuwait's most prominent architectural achievement. Kuwait Towers were completed in 1978 and designed by VBB, Sune and Joe Lindström, Stig Egnell, and Björn & Björn Design (Malene Björn). Together, the Kuwait Towers and the water towers serve as a connected water infrastructure. The project was nominated for The Aga Khan Award for Architecture 1978-1980 Cycle. The National Assembly of Kuwait is also a landmark building, designed by the Danish architect Jørn Utzon and completed in 1972.

== Sustainability ==
Kuwait's contemporary architecture increasingly incorporates sustainable design and green building practices to address extreme desert climates and water scarcity. The National Committee of Building Codes of Kuwait (NCOBC) established guidelines, including the Kuwait Green Building Code, which mandate enhanced thermal insulation, high-performance glazing, and optimized HVAC systems to reduce heavy cooling-driven energy consumption. Regulations also promote water-saving fixtures, greywater recycling, and solar energy integration. Modern projects, such as the National Bank of Kuwait Headquarters, utilize double-skin facades, external shading, and smart building automation.

== Gallery ==
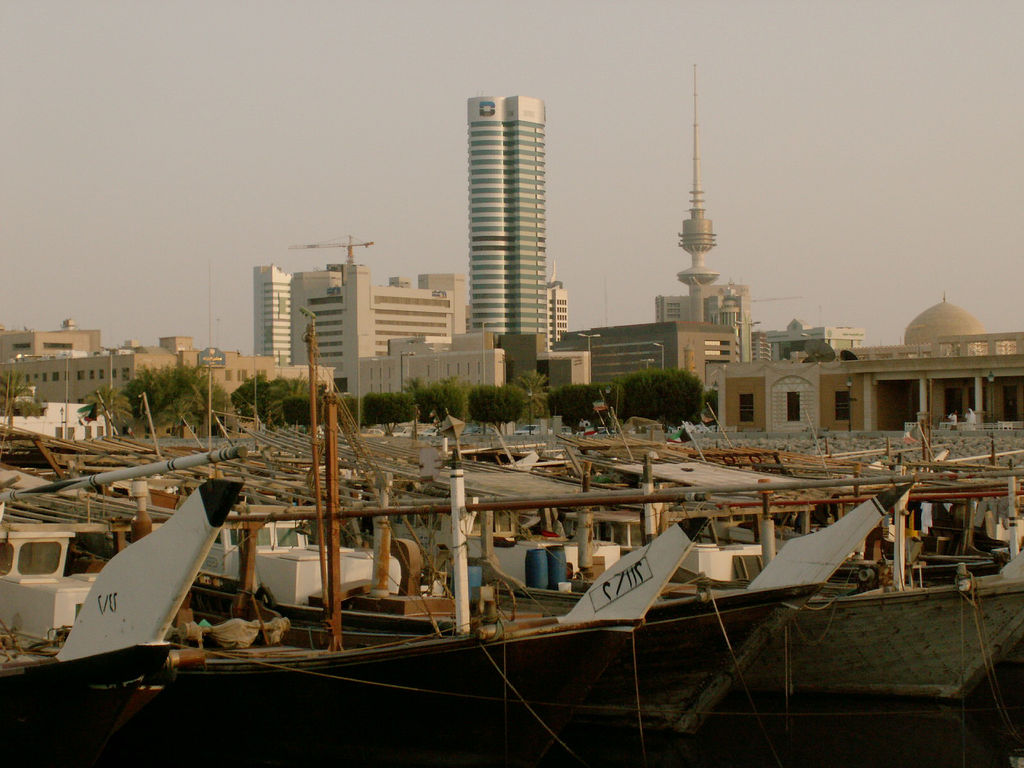
Kuwait city skyline

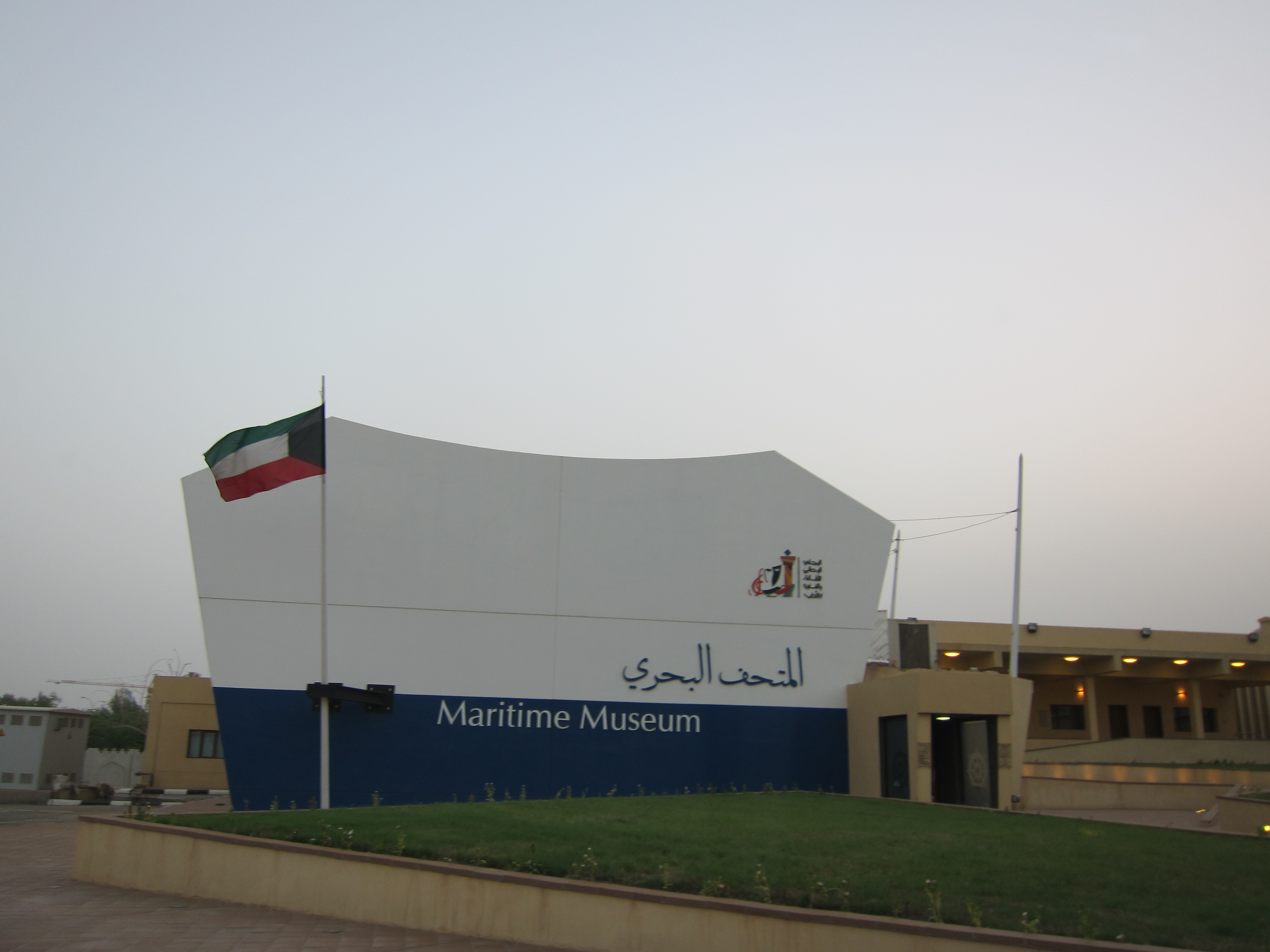
Al-Hashemi-II Marine Museum in Kuwait City

== See also ==
- List of tallest buildings in Kuwait
