= Kuwait–Najd War =

Post-WW1 conflict in Kuwait

Kuwait-Najd War
- Part of the Unification of Saudi Arabia
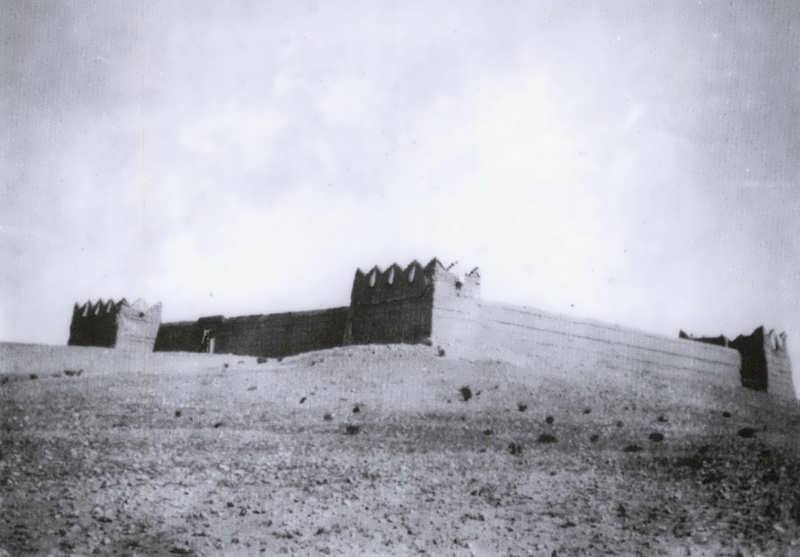
- Kuwait Red Fort during the war
Date	1919–1920
Location	Kuwait
Result	Uqair Protocol of 1922: Kuwait loses more than two thirds of its territory as a result of the agreement; Kuwait is allowed to retain its religious tolerance instead of having Wahhabism enforced upon it

Belligerents
Nejd: Ikhwan	Kuwait; United Kingdom: Royal Air Force

Commanders and leaders
Faisal al-Duwaish	Salim I Sheikh Ali Khalifa Al-Abdullah II Al-Sabah; Sheikh Duaij Salman Al-Sabah; Sheikh Abdullah Jaber Al-Abdullah II Al-Sabah

Strength
5,000 cavalrymen	2,000 cavalrymen

Casualties and losses
500–800 killed	300 killed

The Kuwait–Najd War erupted in the aftermath of World War I. The war occurred due to Ibn Saud of Najd's desire to annex Kuwait. The sharpened conflict between Kuwait and Najd led to the death of hundreds of Kuwaitis. The war resulted in sporadic border clashes throughout 1919–1920.

Following the Kuwait–Najd War, Ibn Saud imposed a trade blockade against Kuwait for 14 years from 1923 until 1937. The goal of the Saudi economic and military aggression against Kuwait was to annex as much of Kuwait's territory as possible. At the Uqair conference in 1922, the boundaries of Kuwait and Najd were set. Kuwait had no representative at the Uqair conference. After the Uqair conference, Kuwait was still subjected to a Saudi economic blockade and intermittent Saudi raids.

== History and events ==
In 1913 Emir Abdulaziz Al-Saud of Riyadh captured the Sanjak of Hasa from the Ottomans to become the new neighbor to the Emirate of Kuwait. According to the Anglo-Ottoman Convention of 1913, Kuwait's border extended south to Manifa (about 200 km from Kuwait city), but the newly expanded Saudi state did not recognize the Convention since the Ottoman province annexed to Najd.

In 1919 Sheikh Salim Al-Mubarak Al-Sabah intended to build a commercial city in the south of Kuwait. This caused a diplomatic crisis with Najd, but Britain intervened, dissuading Sheikh Salim from building the city.

In 1920, an attempt by the Ikhwan to build a stronghold in southern Kuwait led to the Battle of Hamdh, involving 2,000 Ikhwan fighters against 100 Kuwaiti cavalrymen and 200 Kuwaiti infantrymen. The battle lasted six days and resulted in heavy but unknown casualties on both sides resulting in the victory of the Ikhwan forces and leading to the battle of Jahra around the Kuwait Red Fort.

The Battle of Jahra happened as the result of the Battle of Hamdh. A force of 3,000 to 4,000 Ikhwan, led by Faisal al-Duwaish, attacked the Red Fort at Al-Jahra, defended by 1,500 men. The fort was besieged with the Kuwaiti position precarious; had the fort fallen, Kuwait would likely have been incorporated into Ibn Saud's empire.

The Ikhwan attack repulsed for the while, negotiations began between Salim and al-Duwaish; the latter threatened another attack if the Kuwaiti forces did not surrender. The local merchant class convinced Salim to call in help from British troops, who showed up with airplanes and three warships, ending the attacks.

After the Battle of Jahra, Ibn Saud's warriors, the Ikhwan, demanded that Kuwait follow five rules: evict all the Shias, adopt the Ikhwan doctrine, label the Turks "heretics", abolish smoking, munkar and prostitution, and destroy the American missionary hospital.

Kuwait is known for its religious tolerance. Palgrave noted that:

"The Sunni people of Kuwait are tolerant to others and not over-rigid to themselves; Wahhabism is carefully proscribed, all the efforts of Najd have never succeeded in making one single proselyte at Kuwait."

== Aftermath ==
The 1922 Treaty of Uqair defined Kuwait's border with the Saudis and also established the Saudi-Kuwaiti neutral zone, an area of about 5,180 km² adjoining Kuwait's southern border.

== See also ==
- Kuwait Red Fort
- Unification of Saudi Arabia
- Ikhwan
- Faisal al-Duwaish
- List of wars involving Saudi Arabia
