= Battle of Jahra =

1920 battle of the Kuwait–Najd War

- Part of the Kuwait-Najd War
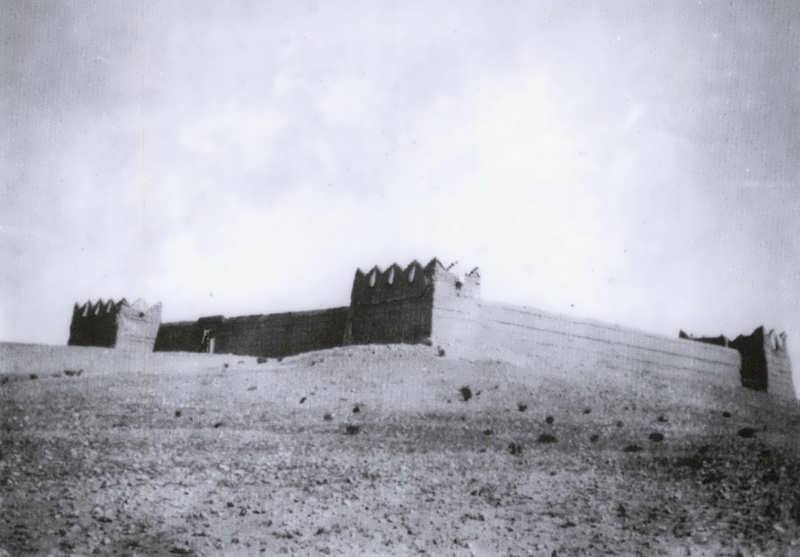
- Kuwait Red Fort
Date	10 October 1920
Location	Kuwait Red Fort, Al-Jahra, Kuwait
Result	Kuwaiti victory: Ikhwan retreat from the Red Fort; Ikhwan retreat from the Jahra

Belligerents
Nejd and Hasa: Ikhwan	Kuwait

Commanders and leaders
Faisal al-Dwaish	Salim I (Commander of Defense Security Force Cavalry and Infantry of Al-Kout Fortress); Sheikh Jaber Al-Abdullah II Al-Sabah † (General cavalry commander); Sheikh Ali Khalifa Al-Abdullah II Al-Sabah; Sheikh Duaij Salman Al-Sabah; Sheikh Abdullah Jaber Al-Abdullah II Al-Sabah

Strength
3,000–4,000 men	1,500–4,000 men

Casualties and losses
400–500 killed	300 killed

The Battle of Jahra occurred on 10 October 1920 during the Kuwait–Najd War, pitting Sheikh Salem Al-Mubarak Al-Sabah, the ruler of Kuwait, against the Ikhwan forces led by Faisal al-Duwaish, the sheikh of the Mutayr tribe. The confrontation took place in the village of Al-Jahra, located west of Kuwait City. The battle resulted in a costly defeat for the Ikhwan, who failed to capture Jahra village. Sheikh Salem, along with some of his forces, took refuge in the Red Palace, where they fortified themselves.

The Ikhwan then besieged the fort and offered terms of reconciliation to Sheikh Salem, which he refused. This prompted the Ikhwan to launch an attack on the palace, but they failed to breach its defenses. Despite the successes of the Kuwaiti forces in repelling the attackers, the defenders faced severe difficulties due to a lack of water, making it hard to endure the siege. As the second day of fighting began, their patience was nearly exhausted. However, the arrival of reinforcements by sea to Kuwait City provided much-needed relief.

Faisal Al-Duwaish, in an attempt to gauge the condition of the besieged, sent an Ikhwan jurist to negotiate terms of reconciliation. Sheikh Salem pretended to accept these terms but had no intention of honoring them, focusing instead on ending the siege. He instructed his secretary to draft a letter to Faisal Al-Duwaish, feigning submission to the reconciliation terms, on the condition that the Ikhwan withdraw from the palace and Jahra. As a result, the Ikhwan withdrew to Subaihiya in southern Kuwait on 12 October 1920.

The Ikhwan, after their initial siege and failed assault on the Red Palace during the Battle of Jahra, attempted to negotiate with Sheikh Salem Al-Mubarak Al-Sabah to finalize the reconciliation process. However, Sheikh Salem declined their terms and instead sought British military assistance. In response, the British deployed military forces to Kuwait and issued a stern warning to the Ikhwan via aerial leaflet drops over their camp in Subaihiya, advising them to halt any further attacks on Kuwait.

Simultaneously, Ibn Saud, the ruler of Najd, intervened by dispatching a delegation to Faisal al-Duwaiish, the leader of the Ikhwan, urging him to abandon his plans for another assault on Kuwait. Under this combined pressure from both the British and Ibn Saud, the Ikhwan withdrew from their camp in Subaihiya and returned to Najd.

Ultimately, the ruler of Muhammara, Sheikh Khazʽal Ibn Jabir, played a key role in mediating the conflict. He facilitated a reconciliation between Sultan Abdul Aziz Al Saud of Najd and Sheikh Salim Al-Mubarak Al-Sabah of Kuwait, bringing an end to the tensions between the two sides.

== History ==
The Battle of Jahra was outcomes of the border conflict between the Emirate of Kuwait and the Emirate of Najd, which escalated into a violent confrontation between the two entities. The conflict originated from the territorial expansion of Najd, which had annexed much of the Arabian Peninsula, including most cities and towns in central Arabia, with the exception of the Emirate of Hail. A critical turning point occurred in 1913, when Najd captured the Ottoman district of Al-Ahsa in eastern Arabia, bringing its borders into direct contact with Kuwait.

Tensions heightened in 1919 when Sheikh Salim Al-Mubarak Al-Sabah, the ruler of Kuwait, attempted to establish a settlement at Khur Bulbul, a strategic location on Kuwait's southern border. Emir Abdulaziz Al Saud of Najd opposed the move, claiming that Khur Bulbul was part of the Qatif region, which was under his control. The situation led to a political crisis that was quickly mediated by Britain, in the region following the collapse of the Ottoman Empire. As a result, Sheikh Salem abandoned plans to develop Khur Bulbul.

However, in 1920, another border dispute emerged over the ownership of wells in the Qaryat al-Ulya. Members of the Ikhwan, a militant group aligned with the Mutair tribe, established a settlement at the site in May 1920. Sheikh Salem objected, claiming the wells were within Kuwait's borders, as defined by the Anglo-Ottoman Agreement of 1913. Despite his protests, the Ikhwan refused to cease their activities without direct orders from Emir Abdulaziz Al Saud, indicating that the settlement had likely been sanctioned by Najd.

Sheikh Salem initially sought a diplomatic solution, appealing to the British High Commissioner in Baghdad, but his concerns were ignored. With few options left, he resorted to military action, sending a force of 300 men under the command of Daej Al-Sabah to confront the Ikhwan at Hamdh. Daej threatened the Ikhwan, demanding they leave the Qaryat al-Ulya or face attack.

In response, the Ikhwan called for reinforcements from Faisal al-Duwaish, the leader of the Mutair tribe. This escalated into the Battle of Hamdh, where the Kuwaiti forces were defeated. Following this setback, Sheikh Salem sought help from the ruler of Hail, a rival of Abdulaziz Al Saud. Hail sent Dhari bin Tawalah, who joined forces with Daej Al-Sabah in preparing for a renewed assault on Quraiya.

Upon learning of these preparations, Abdulaziz Al Saud ordered Faisal Al-Dawish to defend the village. Recognizing the strength of the Ikhwan forces, Dhari and Daej retreated to the village of Jahra. In response, Sheikh Salem launched three raids: the first led by Ibn Tawalah on the wells at Al-Lahaba, the second by Ibn Majid on Al-Rumah, and the third by Kiran on Al-Shibak. These raids were initially successful, but the Ikhwan forces quickly pursued the raiders back to Jahra. As the Ikhwan advanced, Sheikh Salem left Kuwait City and headed to Jahra to prepare for the inevitable battle.

=== Border dispute ===
==== Khur Bulbul Crisis ====
In 1919, relations between the Emirate of Najd and Kuwait were strained due to a border dispute that emerged when Sheikh Salem Al-Sabah, the ruler of Kuwait, attempted to establish a settlement at Khur Bulbul, located near Ras Manifa on Kuwait’s southern frontier. The area, noted for its natural harbor and proximity to pearl diving grounds and water wells, was intended to become a commercial hub. Sheikh Salem planned to construct a fort to protect the harbor and facilitate trade. According to the Anglo-Ottoman Treaty of 1913, Kuwait’s southern border extended to Ras Manifa, marking the starting point of the Ottoman Al-Ahsa Brigade’s territory. However, the expansion into Khor Bulbul raised concerns for Emir Abdulaziz Al Saud of Najd, who feared the new settlement might rival the nearby city of Jubail in terms of trade and pearl diving. Abdulaziz wrote to Sheikh Salem, urging him to halt construction, but Sheikh Salem refused.

In response, Abdulaziz escalated the issue by informing Major John More, the British political agent in Kuwait, of his objection, claiming that Khor Balbul was part of the Qatif region, which belonged to Najd. Despite his initial resistance and insistence that Khor Bulbul was within Kuwait’s borders, Sheikh Salem eventually abandoned his plans to develop the site.

==== Qaryat al-Ulya Crisis ====
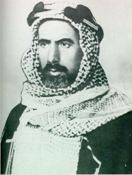
Sheikh Salem Al-Mubarak Al-Sabah.

In early 1920, members of the Ikhwan, a militant group primarily composed of the Mutair tribe, established a settlement around the wells in the village of Quraiya, claiming ownership of the land. Upon learning of this encroachment, Sheikh Salem Al-Mubarak Al-Sabah, the ruler of Kuwait, sent a message to Hayef bin Shuqair, the leader of the Ikhwan and a relative of the Mutair, urging him to halt any construction activities within Kuwait's southern borders. Hayef, however, refused to comply, stating that he would only act upon orders from a superior authority.

This defiance incited Sheikh Salem's anger, prompting him to impose an embargo on the export of grains and other goods to Ibn Saud's followers. In a bid to confront the Ikhwan, Sheikh Salem dispatched a military force comprising 200 men and 100 cavalry, led by Sheikh Daej bin Salman Al-Sabah. The Kuwaiti force established its position in Hamdh, strategically situated near the Ikhwan’s settlement. Kuwaiti historian Abdulaziz Al-Rashid contended that Sheikh Salem's intent was to instill fear in the Ikhwan and deter them from continuing their activities in Quraiya. Conversely, historian Ameen Rihani reported that upon reaching Hamdh, the Kuwaiti forces sent a menacing message to the Ikhwan in Quraiya, threatening them with death if they did not vacate the area.

==== Battle of Hamdh ====
Upon the arrival of the Kuwaiti military force in Hamdh, the Ikhwan sent a distress signal to Faisal al-Duwaish, the Emir of Al Al Artawiyah, who swiftly mobilized a contingent of 2,000 men to assist them. The Ikhwan then launched an offensive against the Kuwaiti forces stationed in Hamdh. In response to the attack, Abdulaziz Al Saud, the Sultan of Najd, reprimanded Faisal Al-Dawish for exceeding his orders, which had restricted him to defensive maneuvers only. The Ikhwan justified their actions by asserting that the Kuwaitis were the aggressors, having advanced to within a mere four hours of their position.

In Kuwait, Sheikh Salem sought reinforcements by summoning Dhari bin Tawalah and his men from the Shammar tribe, who were stationed in Safwan, north of Kuwait. He allocated funds to Dhari and planned a raid on Hayef bin Shuqair and the Ikhwan in Quraiya. Consequently, Sheikh Salem dispatched Dhari bin Tawalah along with Sheikh Daej bin Salman Al-Sabah to confront Hayef bin Shuqair and the Ikhwan in Quraiya Al-Ulya.

However, the forces sent by Sheikh Salem did not engage the Ikhwan in Quraiya. Reports indicate that a disagreement over command arose between Dhari bin Tawalah and Sheikh Daej during their advance, leading to their retreat to Jahra without launching an attack. Additionally, it was noted that while en route, one of the Ikhwan loyalists managed to escape and alert Hayef bin Shuqair and his followers of the approaching Kuwaiti forces. This revelation heightened the Kuwaiti forces' awareness of the difficulties they would face, prompting them to withdraw.

==== Building the Third Wall ====
Following the Battle of Hamdh, there was a prevailing sentiment regarding the urgent need to construct a protective wall around Kuwait to safeguard against potential threats and repulse enemy incursions. In response, Sheikh Salem Al-Sabah ordered the construction of a new wall, marking the city's third fortification. Work on the wall commenced on May 22, 1920, funded by a tax imposed on citizens. Responsibilities for the labor were divided among prominent figures in the city, who were tasked with various duties, including digging, sourcing clay, transportation, providing mortar, feeding the workers, and supplying water.

By September of that year, the wall was completed, extending over three miles and effectively isolating the city from the land. It reached into the sea to thwart any attempts at maritime entry. The fortifications included three gates, along with a fourth gate designated for the emir, each resembling a fortress. When closed and secured with locks and large wooden planks, the city transformed into an impregnable stronghold, with the gates referred to as Al-Darwaza. The wall was further fortified with twenty-six towers, each equipped with firing openings.

In October of the same year, Sheikh Salem received reports that large contingents of the Ikhwan were advancing from the south. He departed Kuwait for Jahra, accompanied by 500 local men. On October 7, the Ikhwan reached Al-Wafra, south of Kuwait, swelling their ranks to 4,000, which included 500 cavalry. They continued their advance from Al-Wafra to Al-Sabihiya on October 8, ultimately proceeding to Jahra, where the battle would erupt on October 10

=== Abrogation of the 1913 Anglo-Ottoman Treaty ===
Sheikh Salem Al-Mubarak, the ruler of Kuwait, based his border dispute with Najd on the Anglo-Ottoman Agreement of 1913, which stated that Kuwait's borders extended to Ras Minifa in the south. However, he was unaware that the Darin Agreement, signed in 1915 between the British government and the Emirate of Najd, which recognized Ibn Saud as the ruler of Al-Ahsa, Qatif, and Jubail, did not delineate the borders of Kuwait.

On the other hand, Emir Abdulaziz Al Saud refused to recognize the 1913 agreement, deeming it non-binding since it was signed with the Ottoman Empire and not with him.

To resolve the dispute, the Royal High Commissioner in Baghdad decided on July 9, 1920, to notify Sheikh Salem Al-Sabah that the Anglo-Ottoman Agreement of 1913 was now null and void, having been invalidated by the British government's conclusion of the Darin Agreement with Ibn Saud in 1915.

== The battle ==
=== Balance of power ===
Sheikh Salim Al-Mubarak Al-Sabah forces in Jahra ranged between 1,500 and 3,000 fighters, including 500 residents of Kuwait City. He was supported by Sheikh Dhari bin Tawalah and his men from the Shammar tribe, as well as Mubarak bin Dri'e and his followers from the Awazim and Al-Diyaheen tribes of Mutair.

In contrast, the Ikhwan forces were composed of inhabitants from the settlements of Al Artawiyah, Qaryat al-Ulya, Al-Sufla, Mabayid, Al-Athlah, and Farihan. Their strength was approximately 4,000 men, including 500 cavalry. The Ikhwan formations included four banners (rayat), each consisting of around 1,000 fighters.

=== Ikhwan's attack ===
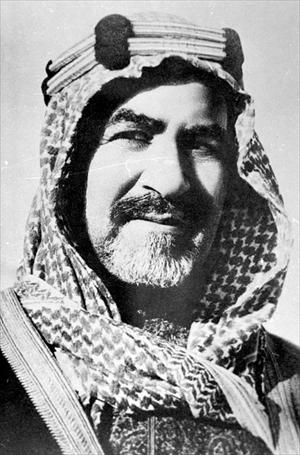
Sheikh Ahmad al-Jaber al-Sabah sent a number of soldiers to help those trapped in the Red Palace.

Ikhwan launched their attack on Jahra at 6:00 AM on October 10. The infantry assault was spread across several directions of the village, while the Ikhwan cavalry focused on distracting the defending cavalry assigned to protect the flanks of the defending force.

Sheikh Salem positioned his forces in Jahra, placing Dhari bin Tawalah and the cavalry from Shammar on the right flank, and Sheikh Daej Al-Sabah and his cavalry on the left. The Ikhwan's attack was fierce and relentless, leading to a confrontation that lasted only a few hours. Sheikh Salem and his troops, stationed in the southeastern part of the village, were surprised to find the Ikhwan face-to-face with them, resulting in a brief battle that forced Sheikh Salem to retreat to the Red Palace.

As a consequence, chaos ensued among the remaining defending forces, who scattered in disarray in search of safety. By 9:00 AM, the village of Jahra had fallen into the hands of the Ikhwan, while Sheikh Salem and approximately 600 men took refuge inside the Red Palace.

=== Siege of the Red Palace ===
Faisal Al-Dawish dispatched Mandil bin Ghanayman to Sheikh Salem Al-Mubarak to negotiate a truce, threatening that failure to accept the terms would result in the Ikhwan being permitted to attack the palace. The conditions proposed by the Ikhwan for peace included adherence to Islamic principles, the expulsion of Shiites, the prohibition of smoking and other perceived immoral practices, and a public denunciation of the Turks, despite their departure from the region years earlier during World War I.

As the sun set without any representatives from the Ikhwan arriving, the night progressed, and the Ikhwan raised their banners to initiate an assault on the palace. However, they encountered heavy gunfire from within. Despite their efforts, they made two attempts to storm the palace but were unable to breach its defenses.

== Military force sent from Kuwait City to help the besieged ==
Sheikh Ahmad Jaber Al-Sabah, the deputy emir, organized a military force in Kuwait City to assist those besieged in the Red Palace in Jahra. This force comprised several sailing ships laden with men and supplies, along with a ground contingent led by Dhari bin Tawalah.

== Reconciliation and Ikhwan withdrawal ==
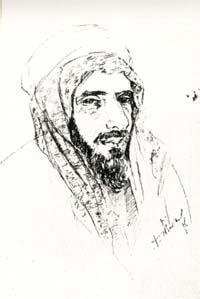
Faisal bin Sultan al-Duwaish, leader of the Brotherhood in the Battle of Jahra.

Faisal Al-Dawish attempted to gauge the situation of those besieged inside the palace by sending one of the Ikhwan's scholars, named Uthman bin Sulayman, to discuss the previously mentioned peace terms. The defenders inside the palace were suffering from severe thirst. When Uthman bin Sulayman arrived, he produced a letter from Faisal Al-Dawish outlining the peace terms previously presented by Mandil bin Ghanayman.

Sheikh Salem Al-Mubarak pretended to accept these conditions, despite having no intention of taking them seriously. At that moment, his only concern was to escape the siege. He instructed his secretary to draft a response to Faisal Al-Dawish, indicating his compliance with the peace terms on the condition that the Ikhwan forces withdraw from the palace and Jahra. Consequently, the Ikhwan left Jahra towards Al-Sabihiya on October 12.

=== Completing the agreement ===
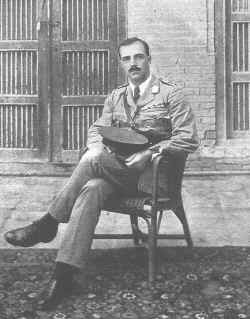
Sir Arnold Wilson, Acting Civilian Commissioner in Iraq.

On October 14, Faisal Al-Dawish sent a letter to Sheikh Salem Al-Mubarak Al-Sabah, requesting the envoy of Helal Al-Mutairi to negotiate the terms of the truce. Sheikh Salem refused this request, insisting that if Al-Dawish wished to negotiate, he should send someone from his side. Subsequently, Al-Dawish sent Jafran Al-Fagham, who arrived in Kuwait City on October 18; however, Sheikh Salem declined to meet with him.

During this period, additional forces arrived to reinforce the Ikhwan in Al-Sabihiya, leading Sheikh Salem to request British assistance. After a week, Sheikh Salem finally met with Jafran Al-Fagham, who was accompanied by Major John Moore, the British political resident in Kuwait. During the meeting, Jafran Al-Fagham sought the implementation of the terms outlined in the peace agreement, but Sheikh Salem rejected these conditions. Major Moore presented Al-Fagham with an official letter containing a warning from the British government to the Ikhwan against any attacks on Kuwait. This letter was later disseminated over the Ikhwan's camp in Al-Sabihiya via aerial drops. Following the meeting, Jafran Al-Fagham returned to Al-Dawish, relaying a message to Abdulaziz Al Saud regarding the events discussed.

=== Arrival of British troops ===
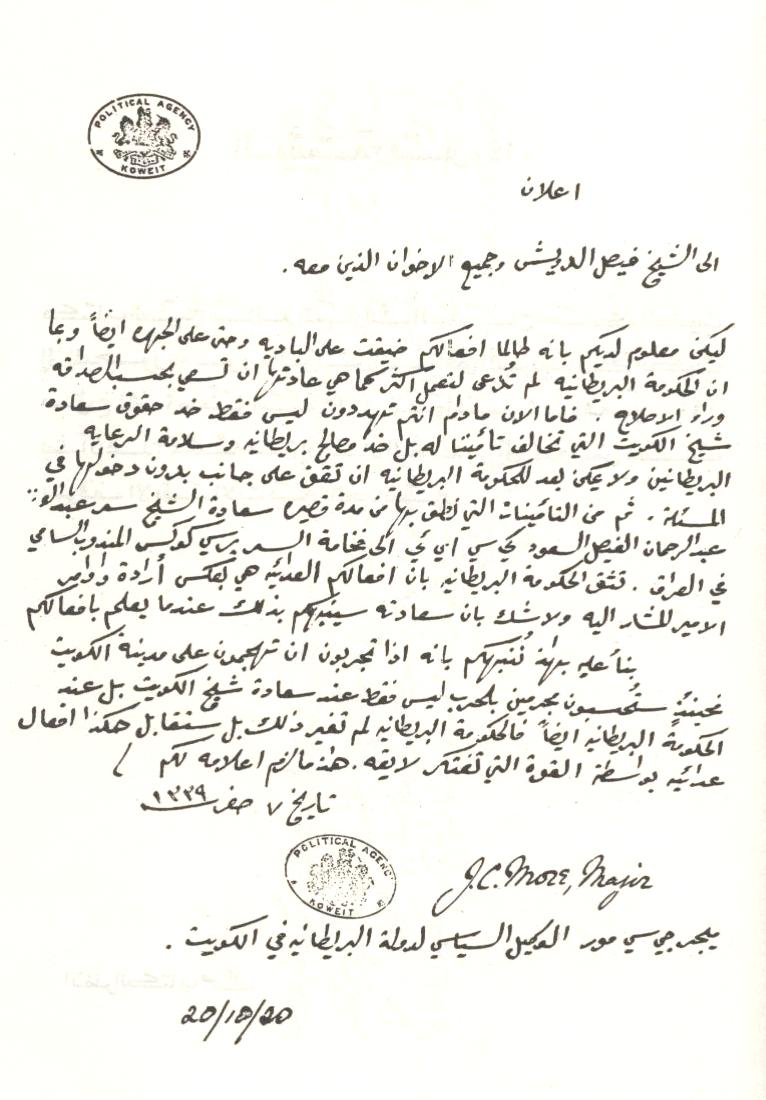
Major J.C. Moore's letter to Sheikh Faisal Al-Duwaish.

On October 21, the warships Especle and Lawrence arrived at the port of Kuwait, accompanied by two British aircraft. The following day, a third warship docked, carrying Sir Arnold Wilson, the acting civil commissioner in Iraq. In response to the escalating tensions, an aircraft subsequently flew over the Ikhwan camp in Al-Sabihiya, dropping leaflets that issued warnings against any attacks on the city of Kuwait.

== Beyond Jahra ==
The Ikhwan withdrew from Al-Sabihiya but returned in mid-December with a substantial force led by Faisal Al-Dawish. They launched an attack on Mazid bin Faisal Al-Dawish in northern Kuwait, resulting in his death and the seizure of his wealth before advancing northward to raid Al-Dhafir.

After successfully capturing Al-Dhafeer, Faisal Al-Dawish established a position near Al-Zubair and sent a message to its ruler, Ibn Ibrahim, expressing his desire to meet and requesting assistance in retrieving deposits that had been left in Al-Dhafir during the raid.

Meanwhile, the British political agent in Basra became aware of these developments through various channels. He wrote a letter to Al-Dawish and instructed Ibn Ibrahim to deliver it to him discreetly. Upon reading the letter, Al-Dawish was displeased and dismissed the men from Al-Zubair who had come to reclaim the deposits, subsequently declaring war against them.

In retaliation, Ibn Ibrahim traveled to Basra to seek assistance from the British political officer, who supplied him with five hundred rifles and a contingent of soldiers to bolster Al-Zubair's defenses. An aircraft was deployed to fly over the Ikhwan's forces in an effort to intimidate them, ultimately prompting their retreat back to Najd

== Reconciliation in Riyadh ==
Khazʽal Ibn Jabir, the ruler of Mohammerah, undertook the responsibility of mediating peace between Kuwait and Riyadh. He traveled to Kuwait to meet with Sheikh Salem Al-Mubarak Al-Sabah to facilitate this process. It was agreed to send a delegation to Riyadh to engage in peace negotiations, led by Sheikh Ahmad Al-Jaber Al-Sabah, the Crown Prince of Kuwait at the time. The delegation also included Sheikh Kasib, the son of Sheikh Khazal, as well as Abdul Latif Pasha Al-Mundhil and Abdul Aziz Al-Badr.

The delegation traveled on the Khazali yacht to Bahrain, where they were hosted by Sheikh Isa Al-Khalifa, the ruler of Bahrain. They then proceeded to Al-Ahsa, where they received a warm welcome from Prince Abdullah bin Juluwi, before continuing their journey to Riyadh to meet with Sultan Abdulaziz Al Saud of Najd. Before departing Riyadh to return to Kuwait, the delegation was informed of the death of the Emir of Kuwait, Sheikh Salem Al-Sabah, news that brought joy to King Abdulaziz Al Saud.

== Demarcation ==
On December 2, 1922, the Aqeer Treaty was signed, establishing the borders between Kuwait and Najd. The treaty was signed by Abdullah Al-Damlouji on behalf of King Abdulaziz, and by Major John Moore, the British political agent, representing Sheikh Ahmad Jaber Al-Sabah.

== See also ==
- Ikhwan revolt
- Kuwait–Najd War
