= Mutayr =

Adnanite Arab tribe

Mutayr مطير
- Qaysi Arab tribe
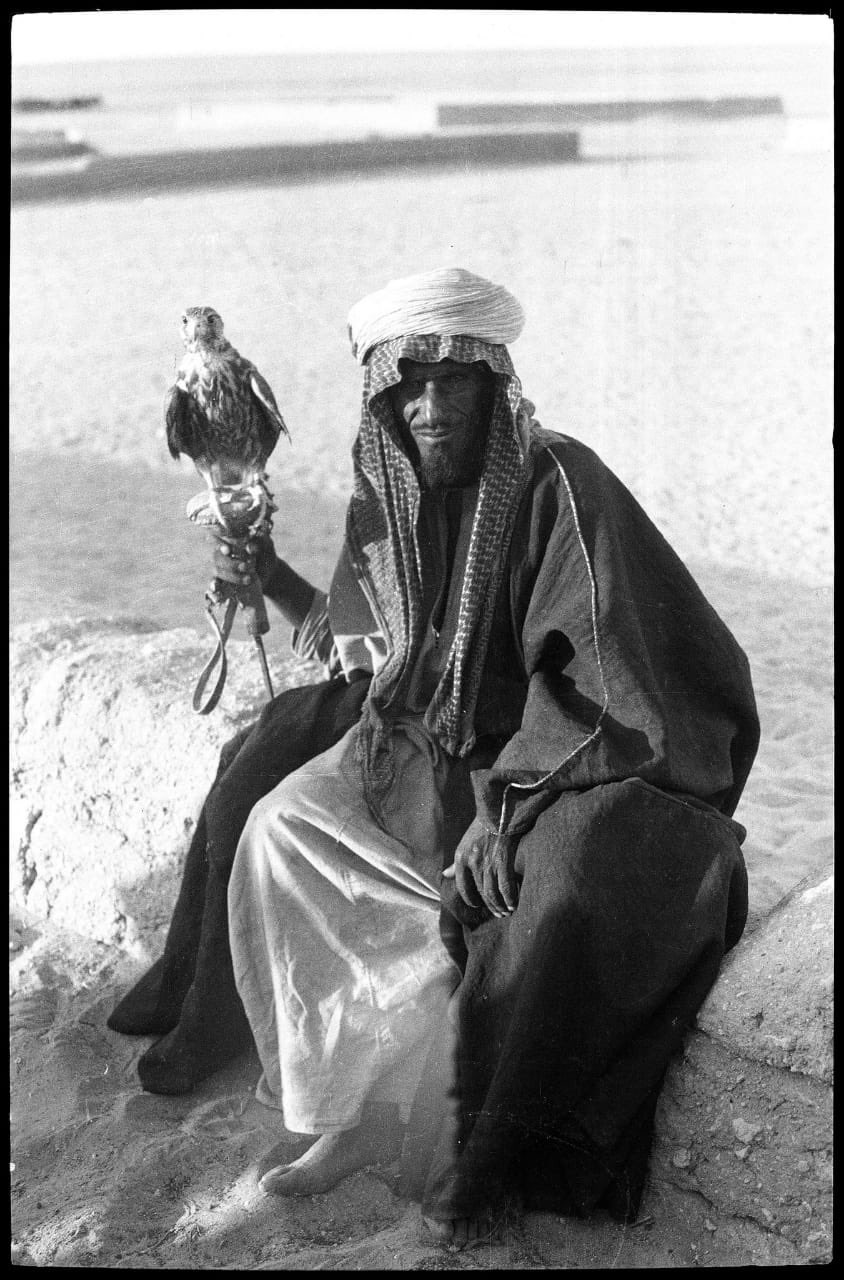
- Ghaneim bin Batah al-Mutayri, a knight and poet of the Mutayr tribe
- Ethnicity: Arab
- Nisba: Al-Mutairi/Al-Mutayri (المطيري)
- Location: Primarily Saudi Arabia, with branches in Kuwait and Iraq.
- Parent tribe: Ghatafan
- Branches: Abdullah; Al-'Ulwa; Braih
- Language: Arabic
- Religion: Sunni Islam

Mutayr (Arabic: مطير, romanized: Muṭayr) is an Arab Bedouin Sunni Muslim tribe with origins in the northern Hejaz near Medina, A large Arab tribe in the middle of the Arabian Peninsula, whose homes extend from the Hijaz to Najd and then to southern Iraq and Kuwait. The Mutayr are a major Arab tribe centered in north – central Saudi Arabia, extending east to) Kuwait ( see AnAss). The tribe's members are traditionally nomadic ( BEDOUIN ) camel herders. Considered one of the " noble " tribes, their ancestral land is the area between the holy cities of Medina and Mecca. They speak a dialect of Arabic. During the 18th century, they fought a long series of wars with the Anaza over pastorage in the central region of the Arabian Pen insula, the Najd, and succeeded in forcing the Anaza northward. By the 1920s, though the Mutayr had joined the Ikhwan ( " Brothers movement of Arab tribesmen who took up the cause of resurgent Wahhabism, the reformist Muslim ideology championed by Ibn Saud, first preached by Muhammad ibn Abd al – Wahhab in the mid – 18th century. In the name of the Ikhwan and Ibn Saud, the Mutayr led attacks into the western region called the Hijaz, where the holy cities of Medina and Mecca are located and also into Shammar territory in the central The tribe also had a historical presence in the desert regions of southern Iraq, being a notable Sunni Arab tribe in the Shia-majority south although some branches migrated north to West Iraq. The settlement of Tall Mutayr in Nineveh is named after the tribe.

== Genealogy ==
Ahmad al-Qalqashandi who died in 1418 stated that the Mutayr tribe belongs to Ghatafan who are descendants of Ishmael son of Abraham (the father of Arabs). John Gordon Lorimer (1870–1914), an official of the Indian Civil Service and other historians of Mutayr noted that the main branches of Mutayr today are Banu Abdullah, Al-'Ulwa (also spelled 'Llwah), and Braih. DNA tests for samples taken by male participants belonging to Mutayr Tribe has confirmed that they are sharing the same haplogroup, and a common ancestor. Various published studies has referred to results from Mutayr Tribe and stated that most of Y-Chromosome Lineage is from the J1 Haplogroup network. Members of Mutayr tribe are considered to be one of the first among Arabian tribes to utilize genetic genealogy to study the genealogy of Mutayr using most modern and recent technologies. Results of participants are published publicly in a dedicated website named MutirDNA.com and also on a public project in FamilyTreeDNA.

== History ==
Mutayr's original homelands were the highlands of northern Hejaz near Medina. At some point in the 17th century, however, the tribe began a large-scale migration eastwards into central Arabia, displacing many other Bedouin tribes in the area, such as Harb and Anizzah who were forced to move northwards after, A rivalry developed between Mutayr and Utaybah, who inhabited roughly the same areas as Mutayr, 'Utaybah, who had just moved into central Arabia from Hejaz.

Because Mutayr were the dominant nomadic tribe of Al-Qaseem, which was the main bone of contention between the clans of Al Saud and Al Rashid vying for control of central Arabia in the early 20th century, Mutayr came to play an important role in the history of Arabia during that era. Mutayr, then, was led by Faisal Al-Dewish, who frequently changed sides in the conflict between the two Saudi Arabian leaders. In 1912, the ruler of Riyadh, Abdul Aziz Ibn Saud undertook to settle the nomads of his realm in newly created villages (hijras), where the bedouins were to be indoctrinated into a puritanical form of Islam and become warriors for Ibn Saud's cause. These new forces were known as the Ikhwan Mn ta'allah ("Brotherhood"), and Faisal Al-Dewish had led the Ikhwan movement enthusiastically, providing Ibn Saud with crucial military support. The most important Mutayri settlement was al-Artawiyya, at the northern edge of the Dahna desert.

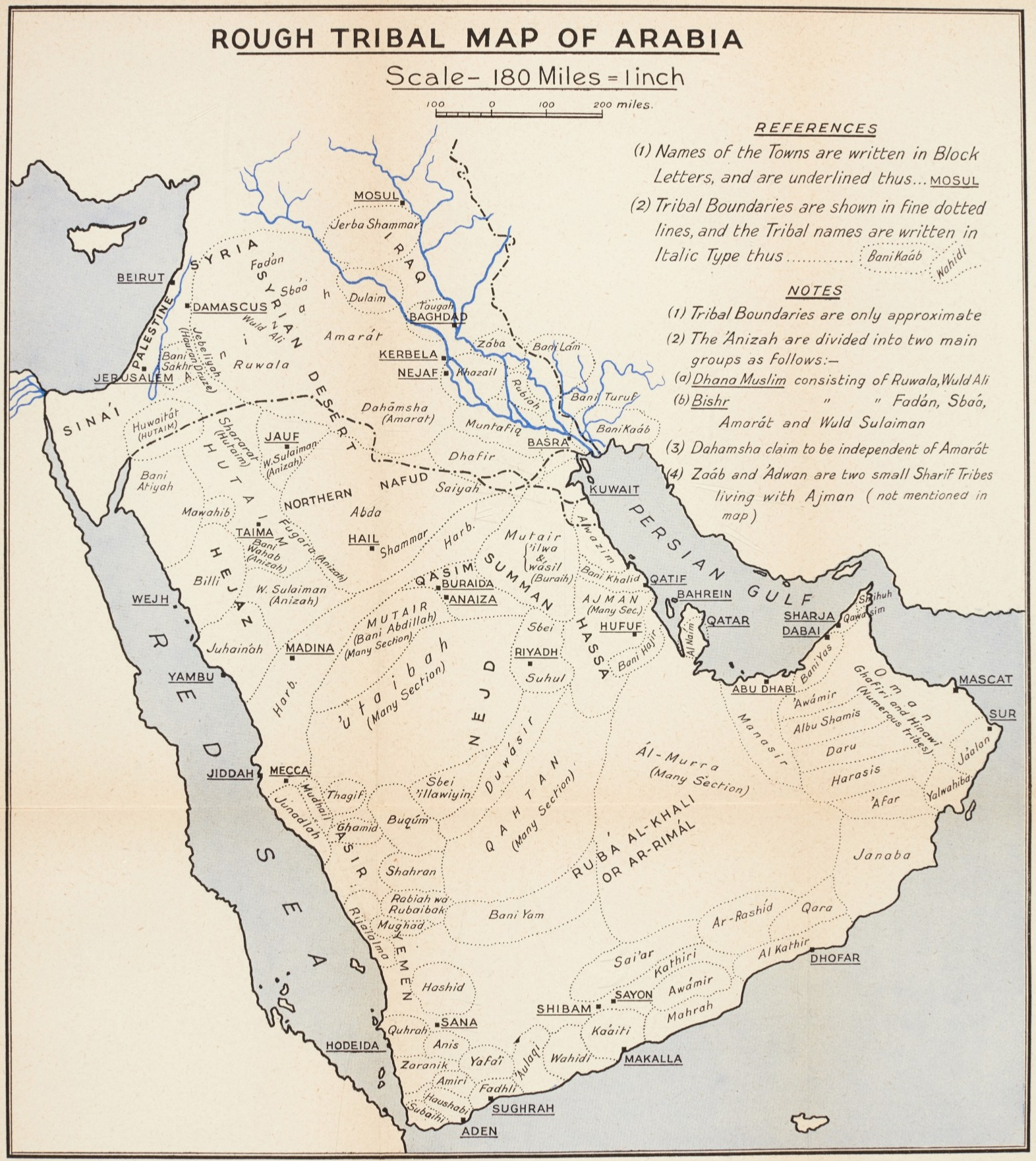
A map drawn by Harold Dixon showing the approximate locations of the Arab tribes, including the Mutayr tribe

In 1920 Al-Dewish led an attack by the Ikhwan on Kuwait at al-Jahra, and were compelled to withdraw once and for all under British pressure. Later, a Mutayri contingent, led by Al-Dewish, joined with other sections of the Ikhwan in the conquest of the Hejaz on behalf of Ibn Saud in 1924. Thereafter, a number of Ikhwan leaders from different tribes, led by Al-Dewish, led a rebellion against Ibn Saud. The Ikhwan sought to take over the newly conquered provinces for themselves and claimed that Ibn Saud had abandoned the true faith by refraining from attacking the European-ruled territories of Iraq and Syria. Ibn Saud, however, defeated the rebels at the Battle of Sabilla in northeastern Nejd, and Al-Dewish sought with the British in Iraq. The British, however, handed him over to Ibn Saud. Al-Dewish was put in prison, and died not long afterwards.

The tribe has historically been mostly Bedouin, with only a few representatives among the settled families of Arabia at the turn of the 20th century. Today, however, nearly all members of the tribe are settled in the cities and towns of Saudi Arabia, making up to 400 villages across the country and especially Riyadh, Medina and central region of the country. A large section of the tribe also Kuwait.

== Divisions ==
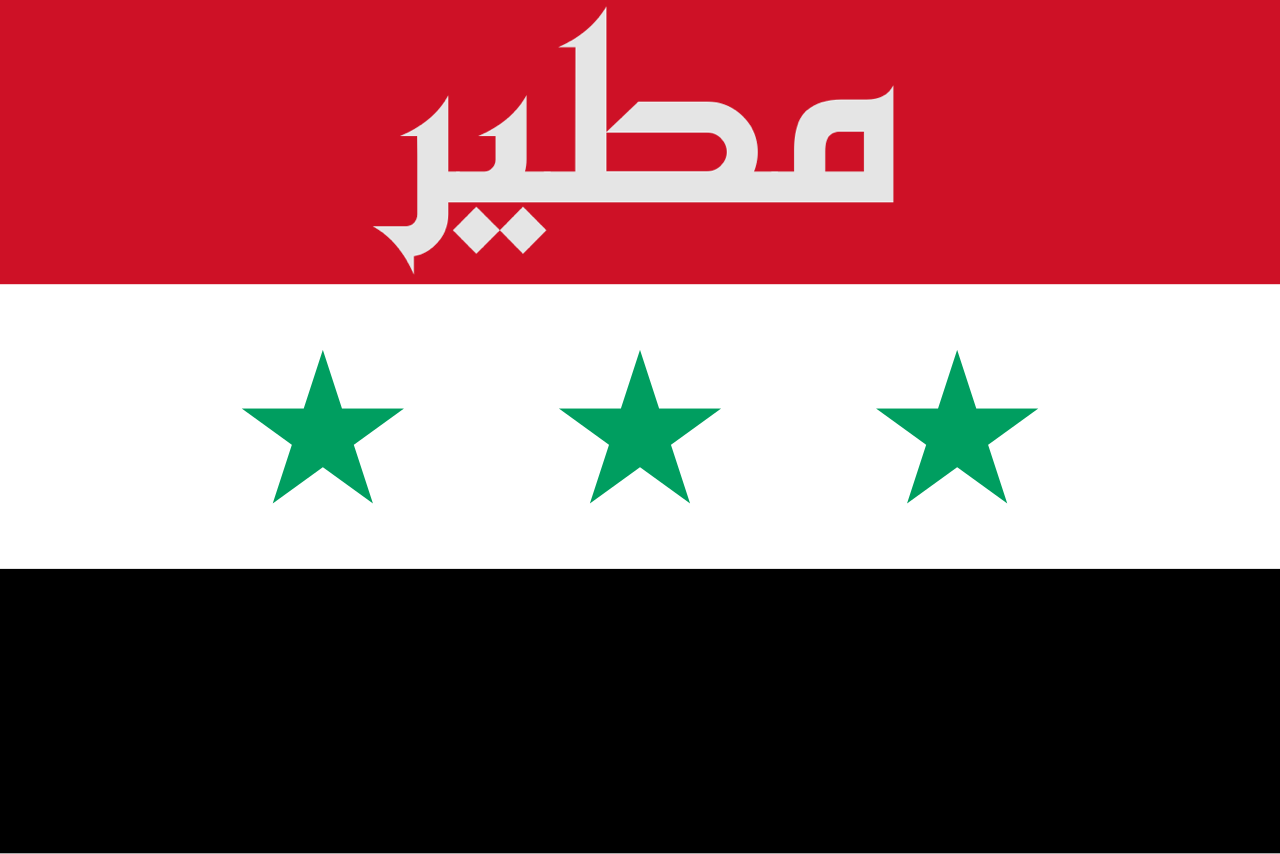
Flag of the Mutayr tribe in Iraq

The Mutayr are divided into three parts each of which are divided into several clans:

- Bani 'Abdullah: the Dhawi ʿUn, the Maymun, the Al-Sa'bah, the Al-Shalalhah, and the Al-Hiwaymlat
- 'Ulwa: the Al-Muhahah, the Al-Jiblan, the Al-'Awanah, the Al-Rukhman, the Al-Mala'bah, the Al-Sahabah, and the Al-Bara'sah.
- Birayh: the Al-'Ibayat, the Al-Dayahiyn, the Al-Birzan, the Al-Tha'lah, the Al-Si'ran, the Al-Muraykhat, the Al-Bidana, the Al-'Awaridh, the Al-Hawamil, the Al-'Afisah, the Bani 'Abdillah, and the Al-Wasama al halfi

== Notable people ==
Among the tribe's members are:

- Dahham ibn Dawwas, founder of Riyadh and opponent of the Wahhabi movement and the Saudis
- Mutlaq bin Mohammad al-Mutairi, led his army against Qajar Iran and Oman at Battle of Izki
- Sheikh Ali bin Ashwan, Sheikh of Alabayat of Mutayr led his army in Battle of Al-Regeai and shot down British planes

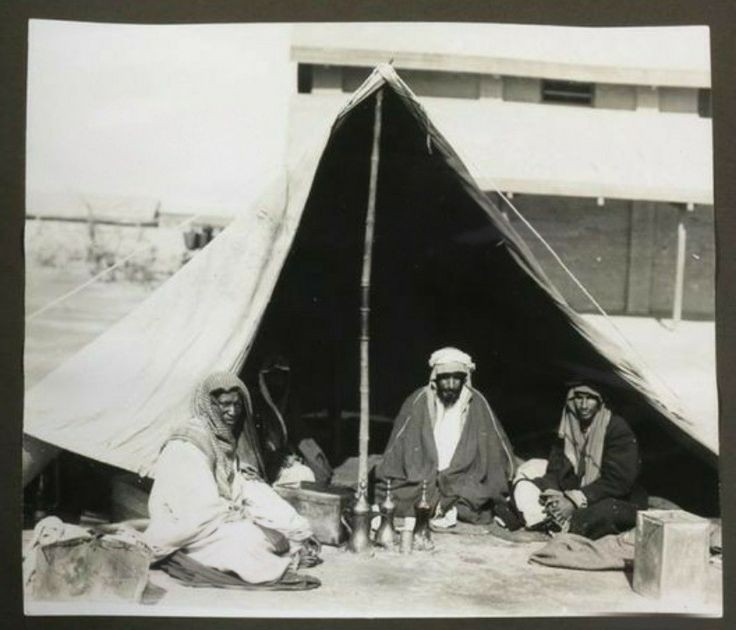
Faisal al-Duwaish (centre), Sheikh of the Mutayr and a leader of the Ikhwan, in a tent with other Ikhwani leaders

- Falih bin al Subai al-Hameli al-Mutairi, one of Mutayr tribes warriors, killed Abdulaziz bin Mutaib Al Rashid at Battle of Rawdat Muhanna
- Faisal bin Watban Al-Dawish, helped Ibrahim Pasha overthrow the first Saudi state and later rebelled against him
- Faisal bin Suqyan, one of Mutayr's famous knights
- Watban Al-Dawish, one of the sheikhs of the famous Mutayr tribe
- Sultan Al-Duwaish, father of Faisal Al-Duwaish, leader of the Ikhwan movement, participated in the Battle of Al-Sarif alongside Mubarak Al-Sabah
- Faisal al-Duwaish, one of the leaders of the Ikhwan movement and the former Sheikh of the tribe. He was from the 'Ulwa
- Ghonim bin Batah al-Mutayri, a knight and poet of the Mutayr tribe
- Adah Almutairi, Saudi scientist, inventor and businesswoman and one of Forbes top ten most influential female engineers in the world
- Hind al-Mutayri, Saudi poet, writer and academic
- Helal Al-Mutairi, Kuwaiti businessman
- Khalid Al-Nafisi, Kuwaiti actor
- Ahmed Saad M Almutairi, wanted by the United States for being involved in the Saudi infiltration of Twitter

== See also ==
- Al-Mutairi, list of people with this name
- Bedouin
- Ikhwan
- Ghatafan
