= Battle of Hamdh =

1920 battle of the Kuwait-Najd War

- Part of the Kuwait-Najd War
Date	18–24 May 1920
Location	Qaryat al-Ulya, Saudi Arabia
Result	Najd Victory

Belligerents
Nejd and Hasa: Ikhwan; Bedouins	Kuwait: House of Sabah

Commanders and leaders
Faisal al-Dwaish	Salim Al-Mubarak Al-Sabah; Sheikh Duaij Salman Al-Sabah; Sheikh Abdullah Jaber Al-Abdullah II Al-Sabah (WIA)

Strength
2,000 men	100 cavalrymen, 200 infantrymen

The Battle of Hamdh (Arabic:معركة حمض ) involved 2,000 Ikhwan fighters and 100 Kuwaiti cavalry accompanied by 200 Kuwaiti infantrymen. The battle lasted six days and resulted in heavy but unknown casualties on both sides.

The battle resulted in the October 1920 Battle of Jahra.

== See also ==
- Battle of Jahra
