= Al Artawiyah =

Artawiyah الأرطاوية
- Location within Saudi Arabia
- Coordinates: 26.509766°N 45.350168°E
- Country: Saudi Arabia
- Time zone: UTC+3 (EAT)
  - Summer (DST): UTC+3 (EAT)
- Postal Code: 15738

Al Artawiyah (Arabic: الأرطاوية) is a Bedouin camp (hijrah) in Riyadh Province, Saudi Arabia, on the road between Riyadh and Kuwait.

== History ==
The town is a center for the Mutair Bedouin tribe, who were displaced to that region by the Alharbi and Almutiri tribes after having migrated to Najd.

Artawiyah was one of the earliest settlements of the Ikhwan Wahhabi militia movement which appeared in the early part of the 20th century. This conservative group mandated strict gender rules in the town, with women banned from the public well and marketplace, instead using personal wells at each household, and gathering at the mosque steps to silently trade with vendors who arrived there. Faisal al-Dawish, who played a large role in the campaign to aid King Abdul Aziz, was then the head of the Mutair and leader of the Artawiyah community.

== Climate ==
Climate data for Al Artawiyah
Month	Jan	Feb	Mar	Apr	May	Jun	Jul	Aug	Sep	Oct	Nov	Dec	Year
Mean daily maximum °C (°F)	18.7 (65.7)	20.7 (69.3)	25.7 (78.3)	30.7 (87.3)	37.5 (99.5)	41.3 (106.3)	42.6 (108.7)	42.0 (107.6)	40.1 (104.2)	34.1 (93.4)	25.7 (78.3)	19.8 (67.6)	31.6 (88.9)
Mean daily minimum °C (°F)	6.8 (44.2)	7.6 (45.7)	11.9 (53.4)	16.6 (61.9)	22.3 (72.1)	24.7 (76.5)	26.2 (79.2)	24.4 (75.9)	23.1 (73.6)	18.0 (64.4)	12.3 (54.1)	7.2 (45.0)	16.8 (62.2)
Average precipitation mm (inches)	29 (1.1)	23 (0.9)	42 (1.7)	36 (1.4)	22 (0.9)	0 (0)	0 (0)	1 (0.0)	0 (0)	8 (0.3)	21 (0.8)	26 (1.0)	208 (8.2)
Source: Climate-data.org

== See also ==
- List of cities and towns in Saudi Arabia
