= Khalid Al-Nafisi =

Khalid Al-Nafisi خالد النفيسي
- Born: January 26, 1937; Sheikhdom of Kuwait
- Died: March 27, 2006 (aged 69); Rabat, Morocco
- Occupation: Actor
- Years active: 1956–2005

Khalid Al-Nafisi (January 26, 1937 – March 27, 2006) was a Kuwaiti actor.

== Works ==
=== Plays ===
- Saqr Quraish (1962)
- Isht wa Shift (1964)
- Ukhti Kelbah (2002)

=== Serials ===
- Darb alzalaq (1977)
- Al-haialh (2003)

=== Movies ===
- Storm (1955)
- Silence (1976)
