= Qaryat al-Ulya =

Qaryat al-Ulya قرية العليا
- Coordinates: 27.5559817°N 47.6602785°E
- Country: Saudi Arabia

Government
  - Governor: Majd bin Abdallah al-'Arifi

Qaryat al-Ulya (Arabic: قرية العليا, romanized: Qaryat al-‘Ulyā) is a city located in the northeast of the Eastern Province, Saudi Arabia, specifically in the historic aṣ-Ṣummān area, which consists of more than 30 villages; Qaryat al-Ulya is the capital of this region. The whole Summan area includes a population of more than 50,000 people, 80% of them Saudis, according to the 2011 census. They maintain an agricultural area with more than 2,000 wheat farms, which ranks it first in Saudi Arabian wheat production.

== History ==
The name Qaryat al-Ulya means upper village in Arabic. It was established on the location of a well which was traditionally used by nomadic Bedouin as a water source. During the rise to power of Ibn Saud, he created new villages by settling down nomads and indoctrinating them in the Wahabbi interpretation of Islam, calling them the Ikhwan. In 1920, as part of this program nomads from the Mutayr tribe founded the city of Qaryat al-Ulya, led by Hayf bin Shuqayr al-Duwaish. The city occupied a strategic position along the pilgrimage route from Basra and Bahrain to Mecca. Due to its proximity to the Kuwaiti and Iraqi borders, Ibn Saud built a fortress there, under the supervision of Prince Saud bin Abdullah bin Jallawi Al Saud, who was governor of Al-Ahsa in 1935–36.

After the 1920 Battle of Jahra, the poet Muhammad ibn al Uthaymeen wrote in reference to the city:

وإذكر مآثر قوم جل قصدهم جهاد أهل الردى لله لا السلبُ
هم أهل قرية إخوان لهم قدم في الصالحات التي ترجى بها قربُ

== Geography ==
The city is located 350 km northeast of Riyadh, 280 km northwest of Dammam, and 150 km south of Kuwait–Saudi Arabia border. Administratively the city falls under the Eastern Province. The governorate contains 22 villages, the nearest being 15 km away and the furthest, 190 km. The governorate encompasses about 260 km.

== Demographics ==
According to the 2011 census, the district contains 50,000 inhabitants, of whom 80% are Saudi citizens.

== Economy ==
Qaryat al-Ulya is distinguished by a high water table and fertile land, which makes it well-suited for farming. Around 2,000 farms in the district product 250,000 tons of wheat per year, which provides for about half of Saudi Arabia's yearly needs.
