= Fuaad Al-Mutairi =

Saudi Arabian footballer

Personal information
- Full name: Fuaad Ayez Al-Mutairi
- Date of birth: August 1, 1986 (age 40)
- Place of birth: Saudi Arabia
- Height: 1.71 m (5 ft 7 1/2 in)
- Position: Midfielder

Senior career*
Years	Team	Apps	(Gls)
2006–2013	Al-Hazm		
2013–2015	Al-Raed	13	(0)
2015–2016	Al-Hazm		
2016–2021	Al-Kholood		
- * Club domestic league appearances and goals

Fuaad Al-Mutairi (Arabic: فؤاد المطيري; born August 1, 1986) is a Saudi football player who plays a midfielder.
