= Ibrahim Al-Mudhaf =

Kuwaiti merchant and politician

Ibrahim Mudhaf Al-Mudhaf (1852–1928) (Arabic: إبراهيم مضف المضف) was a Kuwaiti merchant and politician, who led the first protest against Sheikh Mubarak Al-Sabah. He immigrated to Bahrain where some Kuwaiti merchants led their protest after Sheikh Mubarak Al-Sabah raised the taxes, which negatively affected the Kuwaiti economy before the oil industry boom in Kuwait. Sheikh Mubarak Al-Sabah went to Bahrain and apologized for raising the taxes. In 1921, Sheikh Salim Al-Mubarak Al-Sabah chose him to serve in first political assembly in Kuwait.

Two of his sons died in the Al-?raif Battle, and one in the Battle of Jahra.
