= Hussein Quwaian Al-Mutairi =

Kuwaiti politician

Hussein Quwaian Al-Mutairi was a former member of the Kuwaiti National Assembly, representing the fourth district. Born in 1968, Hussein Al-Mutairi worked as a doctor before being elected to the National Assembly in 2008. Al-Mutairi affiliates with the Islamist deputies.
