= Rija Hujailan Al-Mutairi =

Kuwaiti politician

Rija Hujailan Al-Mutairi (born 1941) is a former Kuwaiti politician, representing the fourth district. Al-Mutairi studied management and worked in the Ministry of Education before being elected to the National Assembly in 2008.

== Supported guaranteeing bank deposits ==
On October 28, 2008, the parliament voted 50–7 to insure all types of deposits in all local banks within Kuwait. Al-Mutairi supported the bill, arguing that its passage would assuage people's fear of losing their deposits and rebuild their trust in Kuwait's economy during the 2008 financial crisis.
