= Munkar =

Munkar (Arabic: منكر, 'denied', ‘wrong or immoral behaviour, vice’) may refer to:

- Munkar and Nakir, in Islamic eschatology, angels who test the faith of the dead in their graves
- Munkar (Hadith), a narration which goes against another authentic hadith

== See also ==
- Enjoining good and forbidding wrong (الأمر بالمَعْرُوف والنَهي عن المُنْكَر)
- Munkir (TV series)
