= Faisal al-Duwaish =

Arabian tribe sheikh (1882–1931)

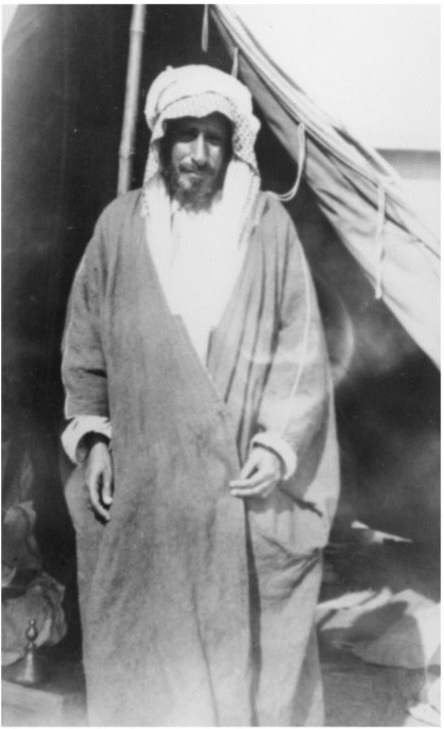
- Born: 1882
- Died: 3 October 1931 (aged 48–49); Riyadh
- Spouses: Wahsh bint Majid bin Al-Hamidi Al-Dawish; Al-Bayda bint Fahid bin Shawiya Al-Subaie; Daughter of Jafran bin Saad bin Jafran al-Subaie; Dhuha bint Sultan bin Bajad bin Hamid; Amsha daughter of Muhammad bin Al-Humaidi Al-Dawish; Amsha bint Fahd bin Muslat Al-Asqa Al-Duweesh; Duha bint Ammash bin Abdullah Al-Dawish
- Children: Abdulaziz; Hessa (daughter); Bandar; AlHamidi
- Relatives: Dhaydan bin Hithlain (uncle)
- Military career
- Allegiance: Third Saudi State; Emirate of Riyadh; Emirate of Nejd and Hasa; Sultanate of Nejd; Kingdom of Hejaz and Nejd
- Branch: Ikhwan
- Service years: 1912–1929
- Conflicts: Unification of Saudi Arabia: Kuwait–Nejd Border War; Battle of Hamdh; Battle of Jahra; Ikhwan Revolt; Battle of Sabilla

Faisal bin Sultan al-Duwaish (Arabic: فيصل بن سلطان .الدويش المطيري c. 1882 – 1931) was Shaykh of the Mutayr tribe and of Arabia's Ikhwan leader, who assisted Abdulaziz in the unification of Saudi Arabia. The mother of Faisal bin Sultan was from the Ajman tribe and the sister of Dhaydan bin Hithlain, another Ikhwan leader and sheikh of the Ajman tribe.

== Ikhwan and death ==
Although he joined Ikhwan in 1912 when it was established, his embracement of the Wahhabi approach took place in 1918. Al-Duwaish commanded the attack on Kuwaiti forces in Hamdh on 16 May 1920. Later, in 1920, he led an attack on Kuwait.

He also participated in the capture of Hejaz in 1924–1925, and although he wanted to be the ruler of Madina, the Saudis asked him to leave the region. This incident was one of the reasons for the Ikhwan revolt against Abdulaziz in the next years.

He and other leading Ikhwan leaders did not participate in the meeting held by Abdulaziz in Riyadh in 1928 to settle the conflicts. However, just before the start of the battle against Saudi forces, Faisal bin Sultan met with the Saudis, but it was not a fruitful attempt. He was injured at the 1929 Battle of Sabilla, and later surrendered to the British forces in Kuwait. With bombs falling all round on his tents, Faisal al-Dawish was finally obliged to surrender to the British and was sent prisoner to Riyadh. The military corps of the Ikhwan were dissolved, and he died in 1931 due to complications from an aneurysm.

== Gallery ==
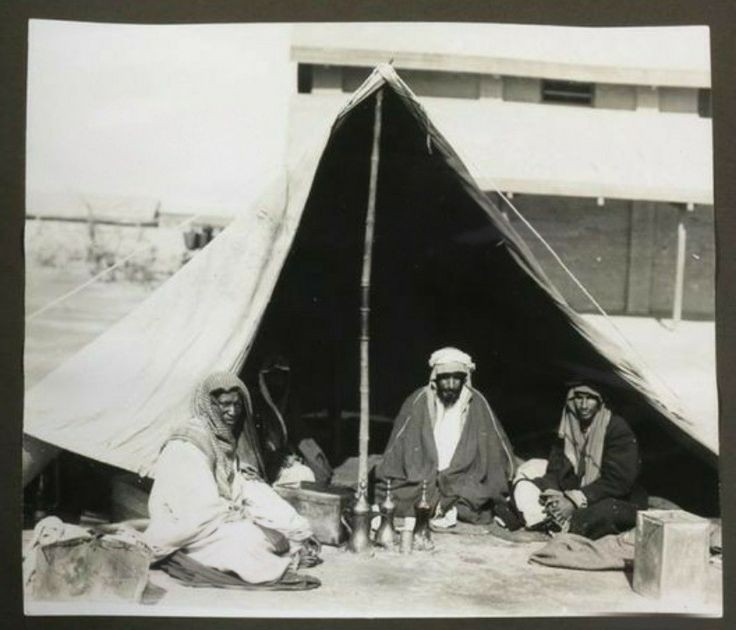
The surrender of Faisal Al-Dawish

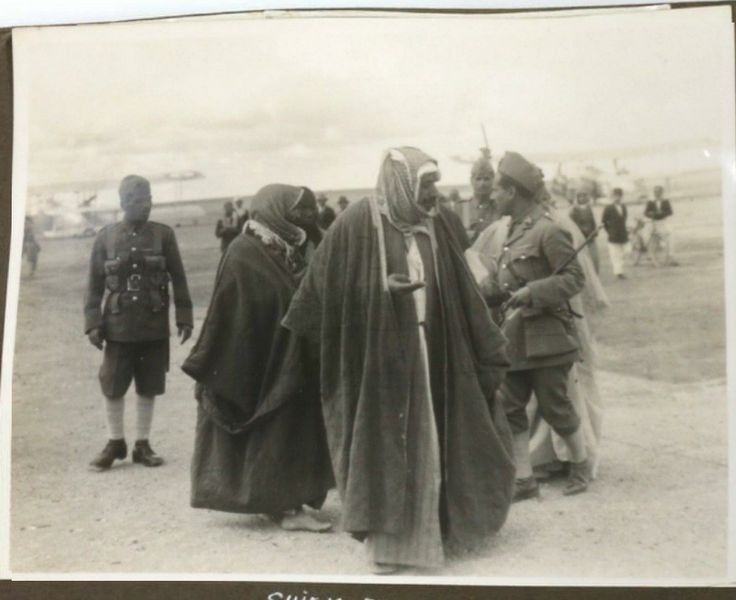

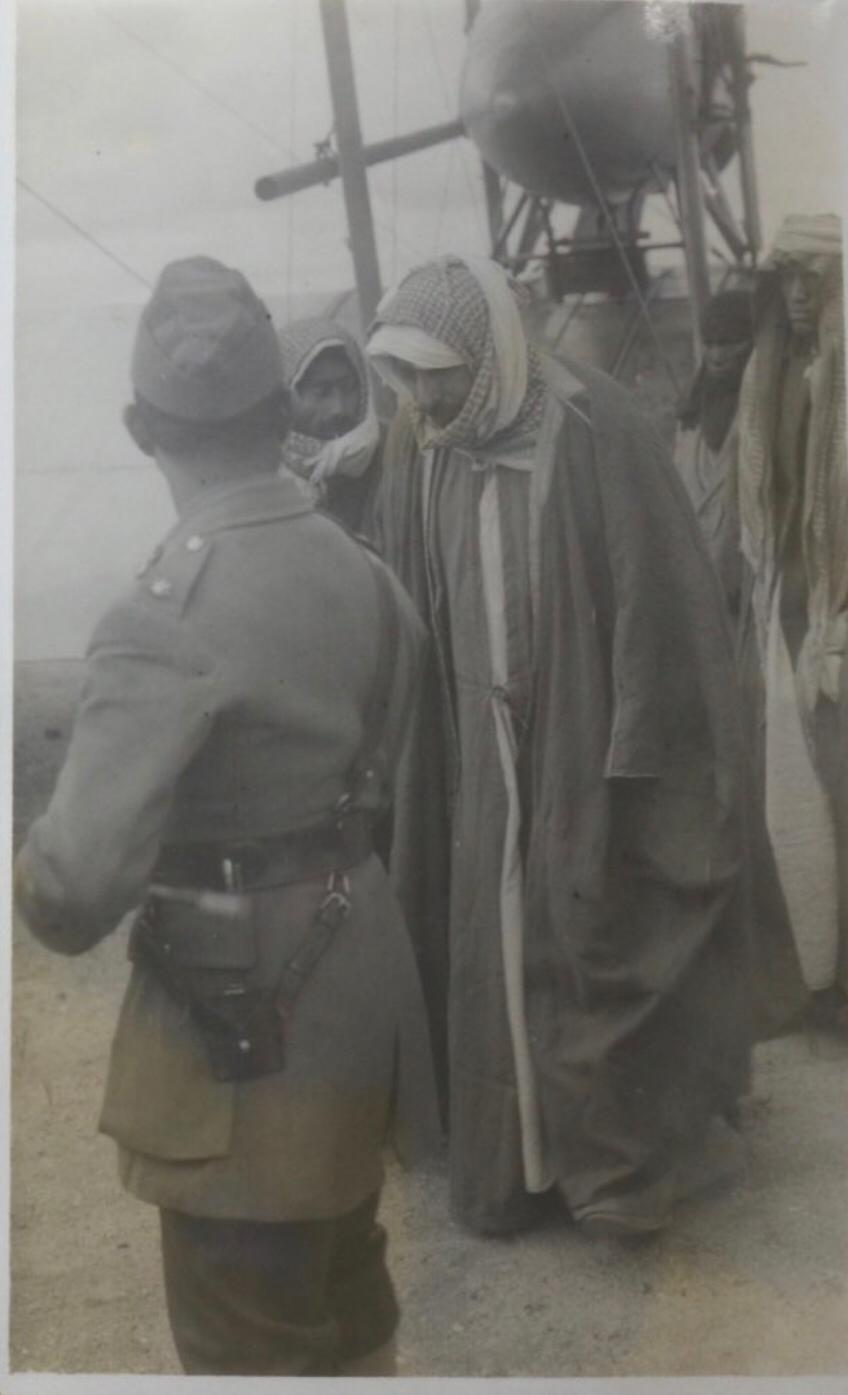

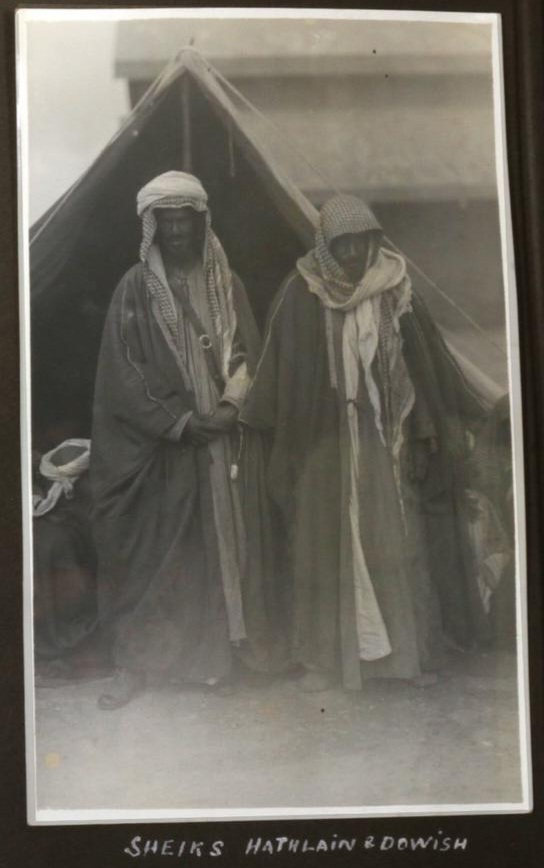

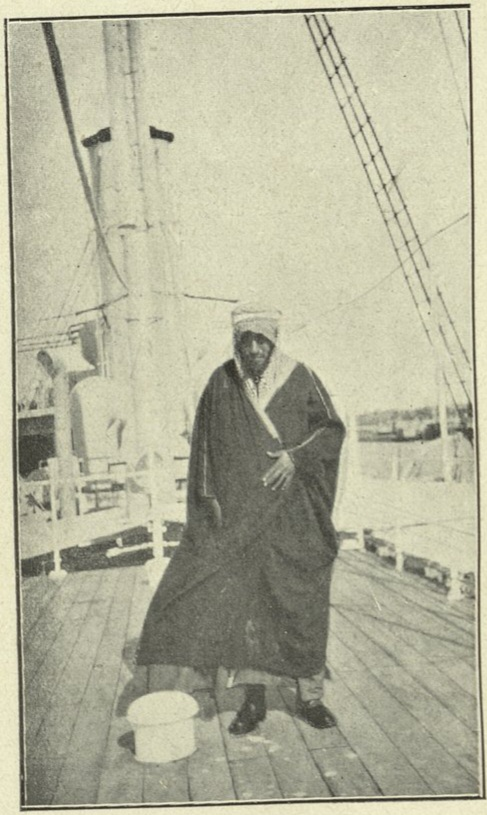
Faisal Al-Dawish on board a British ship

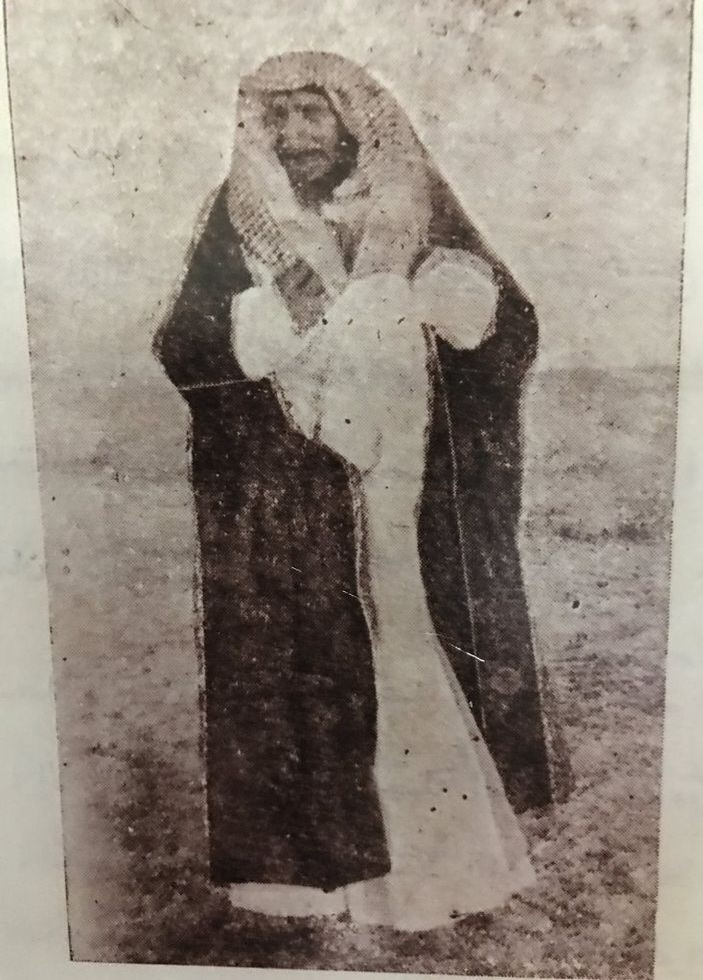
A picture of Faisal Al-Dawish before the battle of Jahra

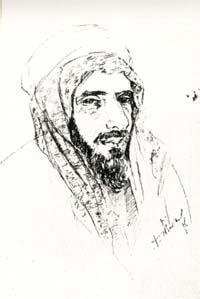

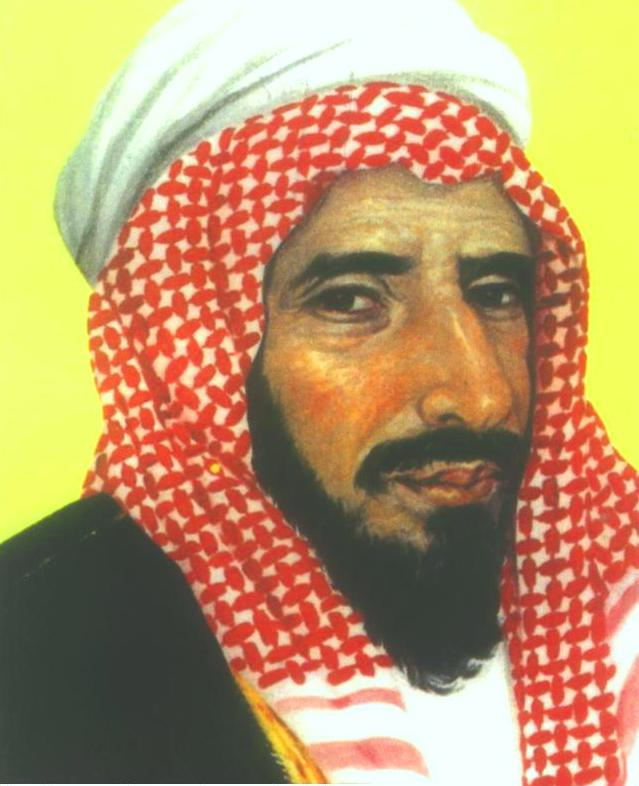
