= Kuwait Red Fort =

Historical palace in Kuwait

Red Fort
- القصر الأحمر
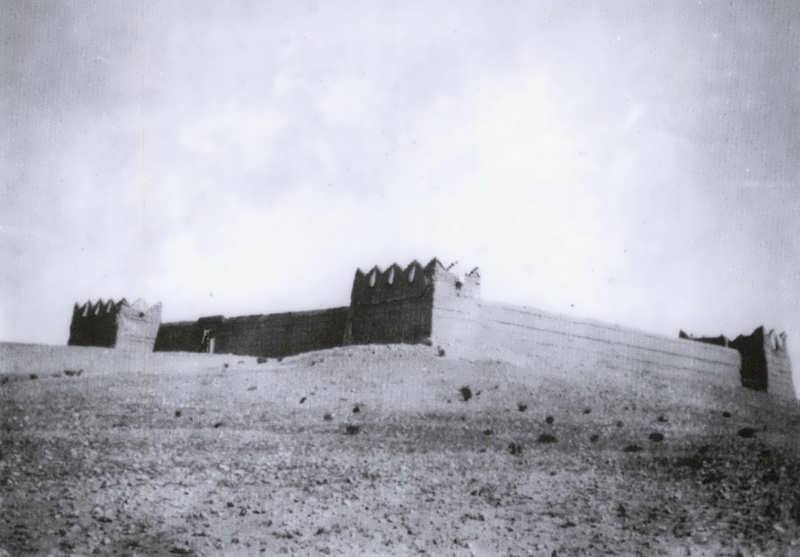
- Interactive map of the Red Fort area
- Alternative names: Qaṣr al-ʾAḥmar

General information
- Location: Al-Jahra, Kuwait
- Coordinates: 29.3480°N 47.6800°E
- Construction started: 1897

The Kuwait Red Fort (Arabic: القصر الأحمر, romanized: al-Qaṣr al-ʾAḥmar) is a historic Kuwaiti palace and museum that lies about 32 kilometres west of Kuwait City in Al-Jahra.

The fort was the location of the Battle of Jahra in 1920.

== History ==
The building of the fort started one year after the accession of Sheikh Mubarak Al-Sabah as the seventh ruler of Kuwait in 1897. Its primary purpose was the defense of agriculture in Al-Jahra.

== Structure ==
The four towers are built with bricks made from mud mixed with local desert shrubs. The towers were designed to give infantrymen a view and line of fire in all directions. The walls around the fort house firing holes for infantrymen and sharpshooters. The fort is almost square, surrounded by a wall about 15 feet high and 2 feet thick, and houses thirty-three rooms and six courtyards. The fort is around 60,720 square feet. The eastern and western walls are 289 and 298 feet long respectively. The northern and southern walls are 211 and 203 feet long respectively.

== Well ==
It has a well in the center, but its water is salty and not drinkable. During the battle of Jahra, the well's water was used to treat the wounded and was drunk mixed with date palm to sweeten the taste.

== See also ==
- Architecture of Kuwait
- List of museums in Kuwait
