= Helal Al-Mutairi =

Kuwaiti businessman

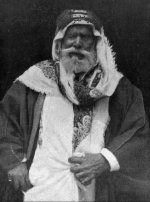
Helal Al-Mutairi

Helal Fajhan Al-Mutairi (1855–1938) (Arabic: هلال فجحان المطيري) was a Kuwaiti business man in the early 1900s.

Helal was one of the wealthy merchants in Kuwait. He was a pearl merchant and trader, and led the first protest against Sheikh Mubarak Al-Sabah with the Kuwaiti merchant Ibrahim Al-Mudhaf. In the early 20th century, he was as a peacemaker between the Kuwaitis and the Saudi Ikhwan movement as he managed to solve Battle of Jahra between the Ikhwan leaders and Kuwait.
