= Al-Hashemi-II =

Largest dhow ever built

Coordinates: 29°18′06″N 48°05′22″E

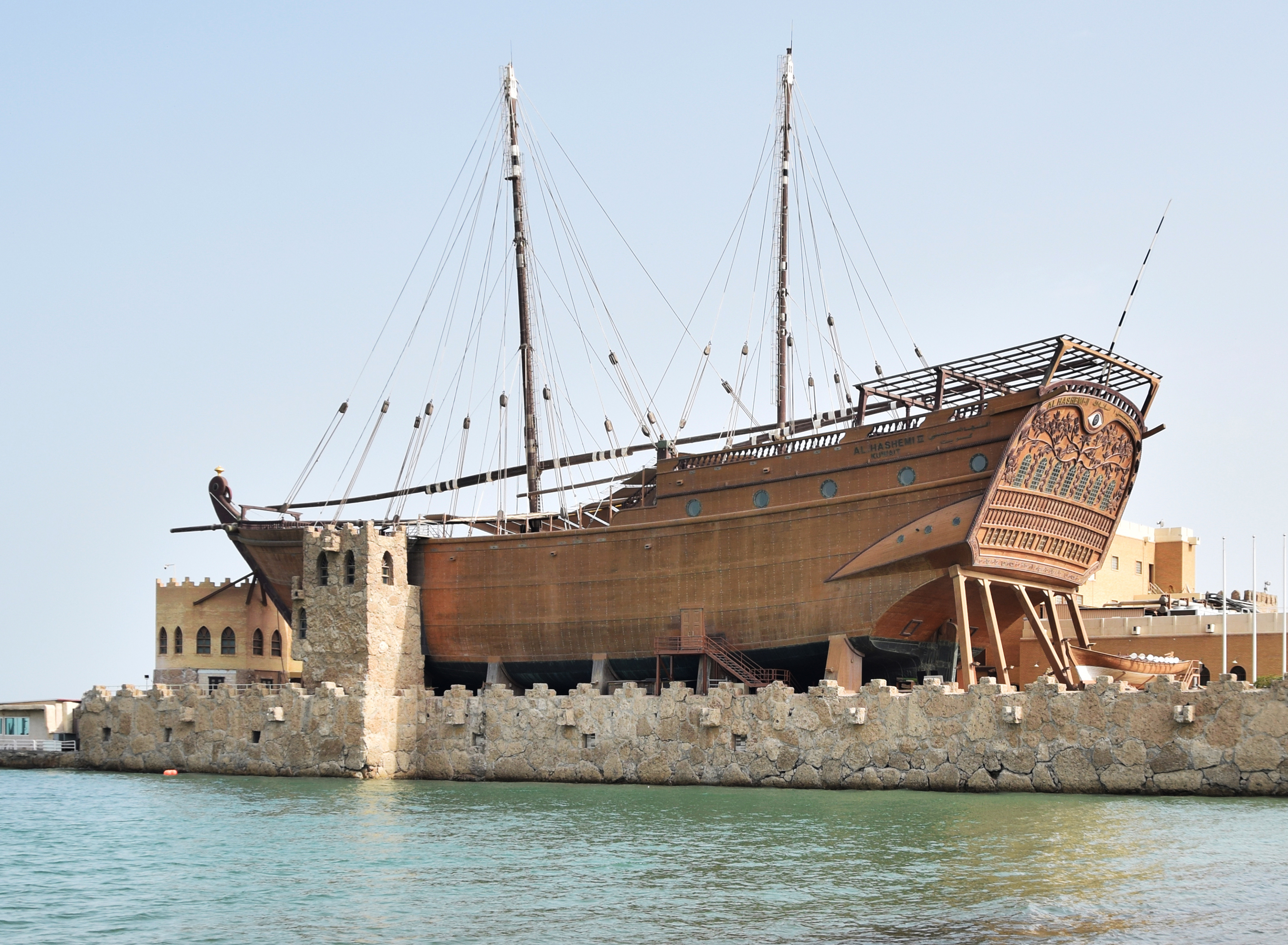
- View of Al-Hashimi-II

History

Kuwait
- Name: Al-Hashemi-II
- Owner: Husain Marafie
- Laid down: 10 February 1997
- Completed: 2001

General characteristics
- Type: Baghlah
- Tonnage: est. 2,500 t (2,461 long tons)
- Length: 83.75 m (274 ft 9 in) o/a
- Beam: 18.5 m (60 ft 8 in)
- Propulsion: None

Al-Hashemi-II (Arabic: الهاشمي 2) is the largest dhow ever built, and is one of the largest wooden ships in the world today. She sits next to the Radisson Blu Hotel in Kuwait City, Kuwait. She contains a maritime museum known as Al-Hashemi-II Marine Museum.

== Development and design ==
Al-Hashemi-II was commissioned by Husain Marafie. Planning began in 1985, and actual construction began in 1997. The ship cost more than $30 million to build.

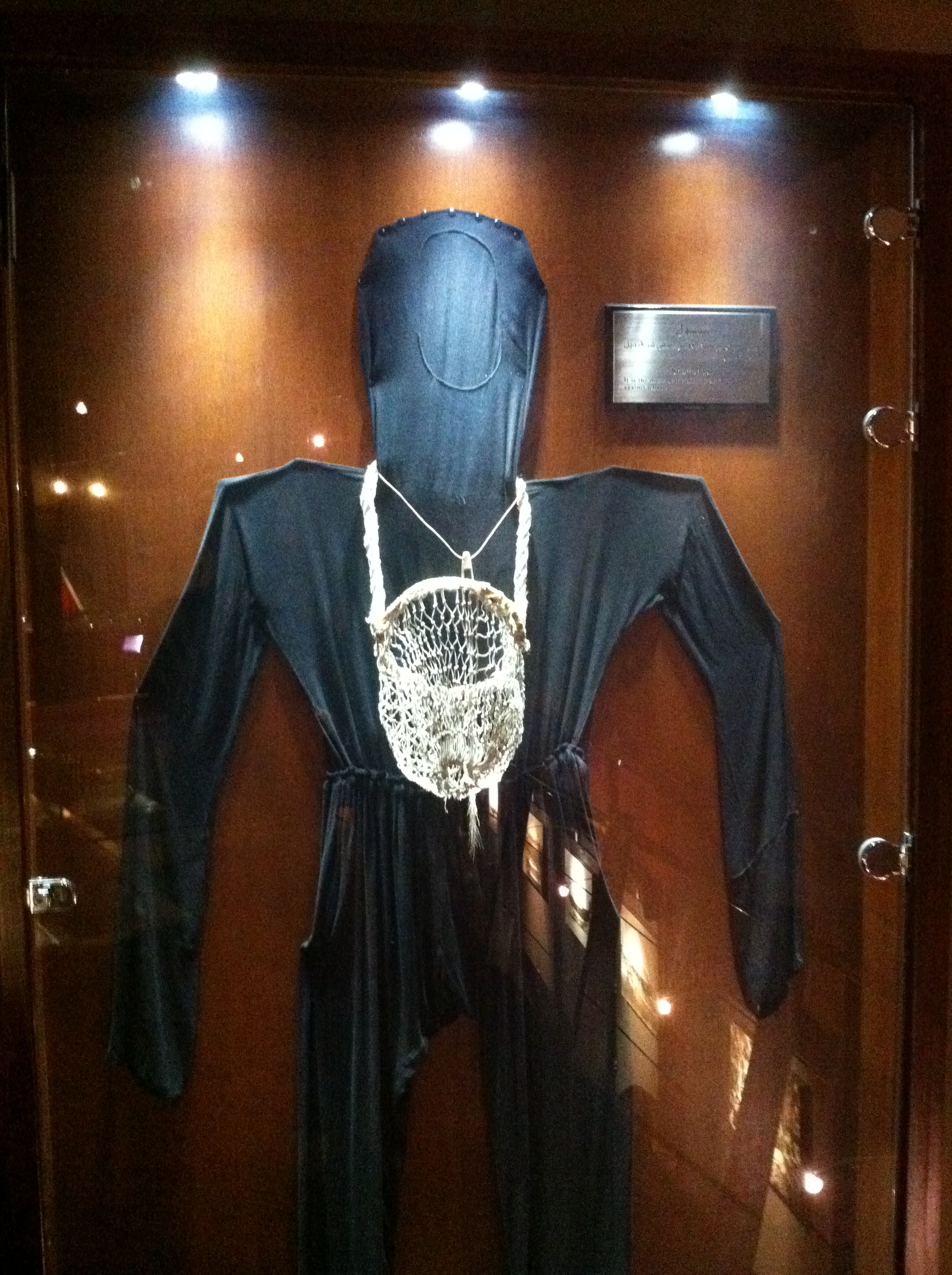
A piece of clothing used by Kuwaiti divers searching for pearls. In Al-Hashemi-II Marine Museum in Kuwait City.

Used for meetings and events and advertised as the "largest dhow ever built", she is one of the world's largest wooden ships. She has never been floated, although she was built utilising traditional caulking and other water-tightness construction methods. She is 83.75 m (274 ft 9 in) long, with a 18.5 m (60 ft 8 in) beam.

== Guinness Record ==
She is entered in the Guinness Book of World Records as the largest wooden dhow ever built, appearing in the 2002 Guinness World Records under the caption "DHOW AMAZING!" and categorised as "Ships, largest Arabic dhow".

The certificate records the length as slightly shorter than the claimed length, at 80.4 m (263 ft 9 in), and the width as slightly wider, at 18.7 m (61 ft 4 in). Different metrics are used to record ship lengths, which may account for that variance.

== See also ==
- Fateh Al-Khayr
