= Al Jahra =

Al Jahra الجهراء
- Location within Kuwait
- Coordinates: 29°21′N 47°41′E
- Country: Kuwait
- Governorate: Al Jahra Governorate
- Districts: Al Jahra District

Population (2025)
  - Total: 73,656
- Time zone: UTC+3 (AST)

Al Jahra (Arabic: الجهراء) is an area located 32 kilometres (20 mi) west of the centre of Kuwait City in Kuwait. It is the capital of the Al Jahra Governorate of Kuwait as well as the surrounding Al Jahra District. Encyclopædia Britannica recorded the population in 1980 as 67,311. Jahra was historically agricultural, and there are still various farms in the area.

== Climate ==
Al Jahra has a hot desert climate and is one of the hottest places on earth. A temperature of 53.5 °C was recorded there on 1 July 2021, and 53.1 °C was recorded on June 23 2024.

Climate data for Al Jahra
Month	Jan	Feb	Mar	Apr	May	Jun	Jul	Aug	Sep	Oct	Nov	Dec	Year
Mean daily maximum °C (°F)	20 (68)	23 (73)	29 (84)	34 (93)	42 (108)	46 (115)	47 (117)	47 (117)	44 (111)	37 (99)	27 (81)	22 (72)	35 (95)
Mean daily minimum °C (°F)	9 (48)	11 (52)	15 (59)	21 (70)	28 (82)	32 (90)	33 (91)	33 (91)	29 (84)	23 (73)	16 (61)	11 (52)	22 (71)

== History ==
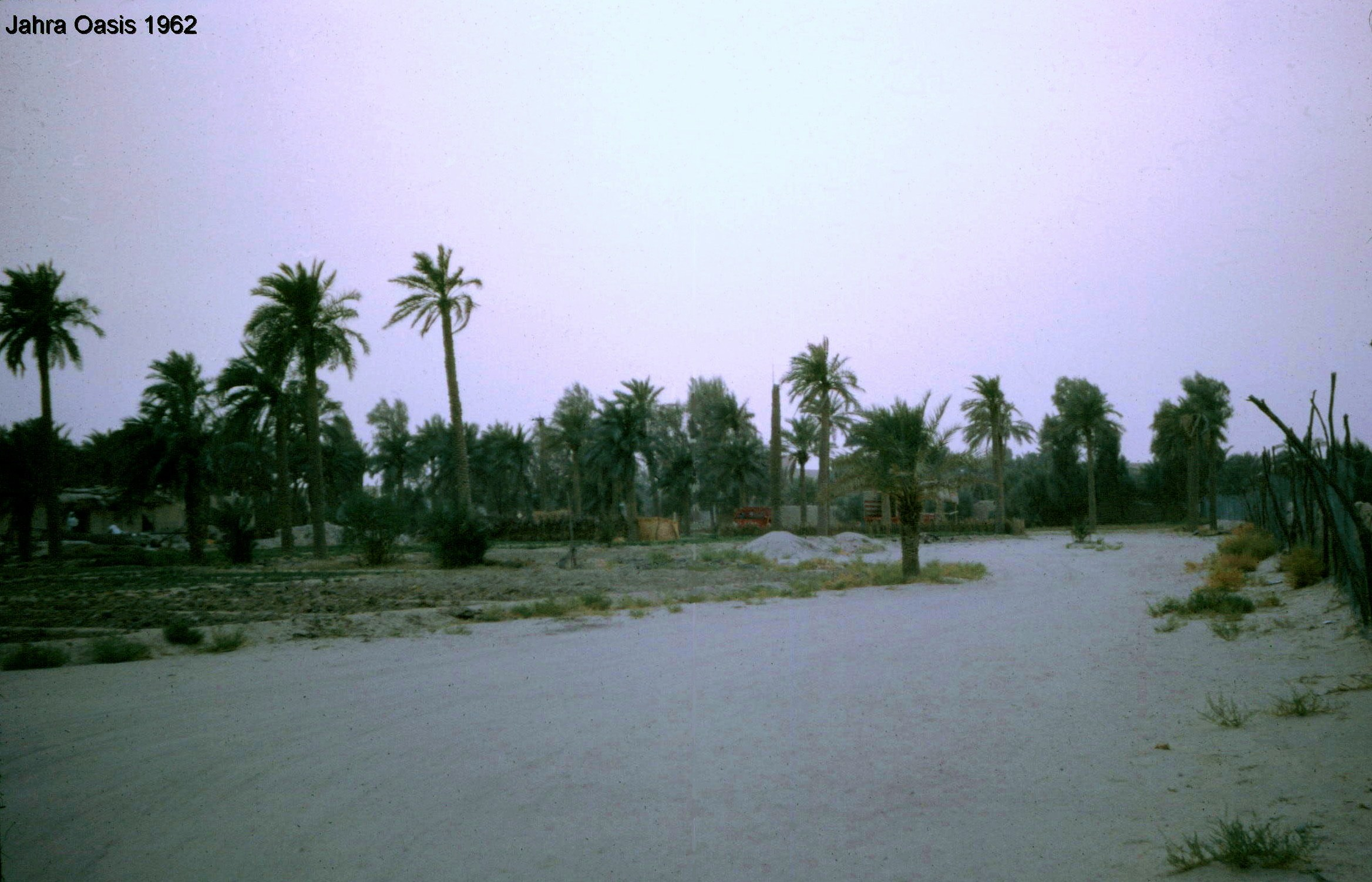
Al Jahra oasis, 1962

Al Jahra was initially founded as a small oasis village and was once largely dominated by agricultural land. Jahra's most notable residents included Sheikh Thuwainy Bin Abdullah Al-Saadoun (Sheikh of Al-Muntafiq), who he fled from Baghdad to Suleiman Pasha in 1786. He wanted to occupy Basra, and Sheikh Abdullah Al-Sabah hosted him until he returned to Baghdad after he was pardoned by the Iraqi governor.

In 1925, Al Jahra administratively followed Kuwait City, and the population lived on the cultivation of palm trees and a little wheat and barley. Al Jahra contained 170 houses, including the palace of Pasha al-Naqib and the palace of the Mubarak Al-Sabah.

Historically, Jahra became known as a notable trading point and stopping place on the way to Kuwait City. It gradually grew into a town along the historic Kuwait Red Fort. Al Jahra was the site of the Battle of Jahra in 1920, a conflict between Kuwaiti and Saudi forces. Today, there is a national monument commemorating the battle. The conflict was settled in 1922, when King Abdul Aziz al-Saud recognized Kuwait's independence in exchange for territory.

=== Gulf War ===
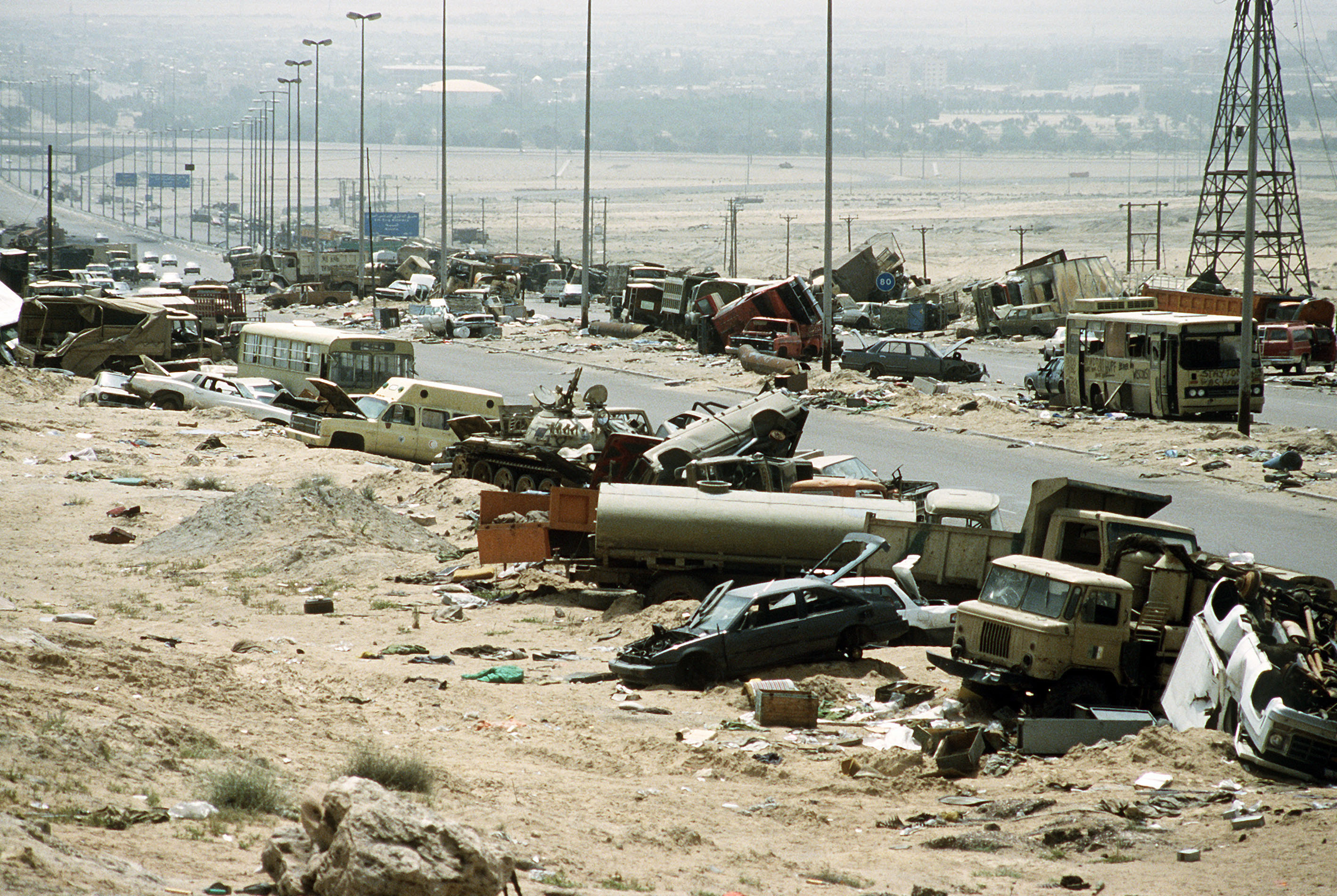
Wrecked and abandoned vehicles along Highway 80 in April 1991

The outskirts of Al Jahra became the site of an infamous shootout during the Gulf War, in which the coalition forces destroyed a stalled Iraqi convoy as it retreated up Mutla Ridge on Highway 80 between 25 and 26 February 1991. The US Army received orders by General Norman Schwarzkopf Jr. to not let anyone in or out of Kuwait City and to effectively blockade the retreating Iraqi convoys within a 100-mile (160-km) radius. He ordered the dispatching of Apache helicopters armed with anti-tank missiles to block the Iraqis.

=== Fires ===
A number of damaging fires have occurred in Al Jahra's recent history. On 25 August 2007, politician Massouma al-Mubarak was forced to resign from her post as health minister following a fire in a hospital that killed two patients.

On 15 August 2009, a fire broke out at a wedding in Al Jahra. At least 49 people were killed and about 80 others wounded when the groom's wife, seeking revenge for her husband's second marriage, poured petrol on a tent where women and children were celebrating and set it on fire. Within three minutes, the whole tent was engulfed in flames, trapping many inside. It was the deadliest civilian disaster in Kuwait in the last 40 years.

== Notable people ==
- Mohammed Emwazi (1988–2015), a British militant of Kuwaiti origin seen in several videos produced by the Islamist extremist group Islamic State (IS) showing the beheadings of a number of captives in 2014 and 2015.

== Transport ==
Al Jahra is located 32 kilometres (20 mi) northwest of Kuwait City and is connected by a series of ring roads. Highway 80 connects the town to Abdaly on the Iraqi border. The highway has become known as "The Highway of Death" due to its involvement in the Gulf War when the Allied troops destroyed an Iraqi convoy. The road was repaired during the late 1990s and was used in the initial stages of the 2003 invasion of Iraq by U.S. and British forces. The surrounding area is desert, but tents are often seen located along the highway. The nearest airport is Kuwait International Airport.

== Sport ==
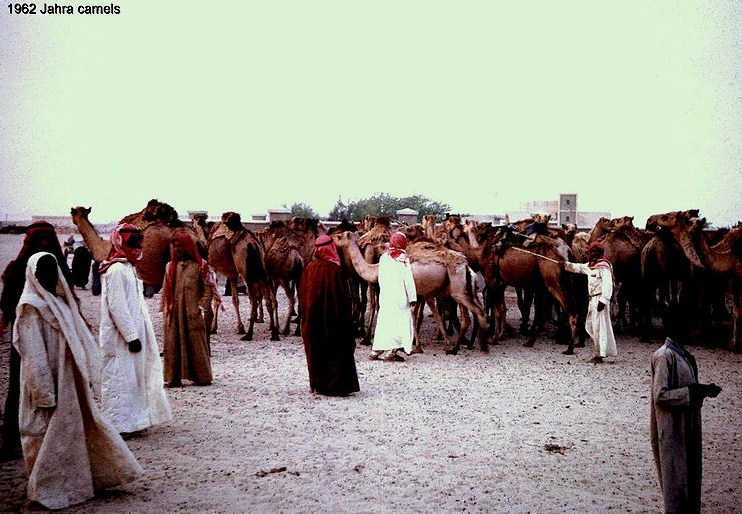
Al Jahra camel market, 1961

The main football team is Al Jahra (football club). They play at the 25,000 capacity Al Shabab Mubarak Alaiar Stadium. They won the Kuwaiti Premier League once, in 1990. They participated in the Kuwaiti Premier League 21 times during the 2007-2008 season. Al Jahra has reached the Kuwait Emir Cup Final twice in 1996 and 2002, when they lost to Al Arabi 1-2 and Kuwait Club 0-1, respectively.
