= List of wars involving Kuwait =

This is a list of wars involving the State of Kuwait and its predecessor states.

Conflict	Kuwait and allies	Opponents	Results	Kuwaiti losses		Head of State
Conflict	Kuwait and allies	Opponents	Results	Military	Civilians	Head of State
Battle of Chains (629 or 633) (part of Muslim conquest of Mesopotamia)	Rashidun Caliphate	Sasanian Empire	Rashidun Caliphate victory			
Utbi Invasion of Bahrain (1782–1783)	Sheikhdom of Kuwait; Zubarah	Persia: Bushehr	Victory: Naval attack by the Bushehri navy on Zubarah in 1782 fails.; Civil war starts in Bahrain after the attack on Zubarah.; Jidhafs win the civil war, however, by this time the Zubarans had just entered the country.; Zubarah gains control of Bahrain in 1783	~?		Abd Allah I
Battle of Al-Raqah (1783)	Sheikhdom of Kuwait	Banu Kaab	Victory: Kuwaiti victory over Banu Kaab.	~No Recorded Casualties		Abd Allah I
Ibn Ufaisan's Invasion (1793)	Sheikhdom of Kuwait; Great Britain: British East India Company	Emirate of Diriyah	Victory: Saudi retreat from Kuwait.	~?		Abd Allah I
Battle of Khakeekera (1811)	Sheikhdom of Kuwait; Bahrain	Emirate of Diriyah: Dammam	Victory: Rahmah ibn Jabir al-Jalahimah's invasion of Bahrain repelled.	~1000 (Kuwait and Bahrain)	~	Abd Allah I
Sheikh Humoud's Revolt (1828)	Sheikhdom of Kuwait; Ottoman Empire: Baghdad Eyalet	Arab tribes: Al-Muntafiq; Banu Kaab	Victory: Kuwaiti intervention in Basra leads to ceasefire with the Bani Kaab.; Sheikh Humoud imprisoned by Governor of Baghdad Dawud Pasha and replaced by his nephew Sheikh Aqeel as Emir of the Muntafiq tribal confederation.	~?		Jabir I
Siege of Basra (1831)	Sheikhdom of Kuwait; Arab tribes: Banu Kaab; Al-Muntafiq	Ottoman Empire: Baghdad Eyalet	Victory: End of several week long siege of Basra by the allies of former Baghdad governor Dawud Pasha.; Arab demands met with the Re-installation of Aziz Agha as Mutasallim of Basra.	~?		Jabir I
Siege of Al-Zubair (1833)	Sheikhdom of Kuwait; House of Al Thaqib; Arab tribes: Al-Muntafiq	Zubair	Victory: End of the seven-month-long siege of Zubair.; Restoration of the Al Thaqib family as the ruling house of Zubair.; Massacre of the House of Al Zuhair by the reinstated House of Al Thaqib; survivors find refuge in Kuwait and Ottoman Iraq.	~?		Jabir I
Invasion of Muhammara (1837)	Sheikhdom of Kuwait; Ottoman Empire: Baghdad Eyalet	Banu Kaab	Victory: Capture and destruction of Muhammara (Khorramshahr) by Ali Rida Pasha, Governor of Baghdad.; Banu Kaab pays homage to the Ottomans rather than the Persians.; Kuwait wins alliance with the Ottoman Empire and becomes unrivaled in sharing with Basra the commercial prosperity in the northern region of the Gulf with the fall of Muhammara.	~?		Jabir I
Al-Hasa Expedition (1870–1871)	Sheikhdom of Kuwait; Ottoman Empire; Arab tribes	Emirate of Nejd	Victory: Al Hasa is reincorporated into the Ottoman Empire and becomes known as the Najd Sanjak.; Sheikh Abdullah bin Sabah Al Sabah the ruler of Kuwait is granted the honorific title of Kaymakam by the Ottomans for his contribution to the war effort.	~?		Abd Allah II
Kuwaiti–Rashidi War (1900-1901)	Sheikhdom of Kuwait	Jabal Shammar	Inconclusive: Kuwaiti Invasion of Najd repelled.; Jabal Shammar Counter-Invasion Fails	~1,200	~	Mubarak I
Battle of Jo-Laban (1903)	Sheikhdom of Kuwait	Jabal Shammar: Mutayr	Victory: Five thousand camels captured as booty.; Beginning of Saudi-Rashidi War.	~?		Mubarak I
Battle of Hadia (1910)	Sheikhdom of Kuwait	Al-Muntafiq	Victory: Kuwaiti-Saudi initial defeat at the Battle of Hadia.; Sheikh Mubarak sends another force which easily claims victory against the Al Muntafiq tribe.	~338	~	Mubarak I
Mesopotamian Campaign (1914–1918)	Sheikhdom of Kuwait (1914); British Empire: Australia; India; New Zealand	Ottoman Empire; German Empire	Victory Kuwaiti Front: Ottoman forces expelled from their positions in Umm Qasr, Safwan, and Bubiyan.; British public recognition of Kuwait as a protectorate proclaiming it to be an “independent government under British protection.; British Front: Treaty of Sèvres	~?		Mubarak I
Kuwait–Najd War (1919–1920)	Sheikhdom of Kuwait	Emirate of Nejd and Hasa: Ikhwan	Kuwaiti Military victory, Najdi Political Victory: Uqair Protocol of 1922	~200		Salim I
Ikhwan Revolt (1927–1930)	Sheikhdom of Kuwait; Nejd and Hejaz; United Kingdom: RAF	Ikhwan	Victory: Ikhwan attack on Kuwait repelled.; The remnants of the Ikhwan incorporated into regular Saudi units.; The Ikhwan leadership was either slain or imprisoned.	~14	~	Ahmad I
Operation Vantage (1961-1963)	Kuwait; United Kingdom; Saudi Arabia; Jordan; United Arab Republic; Sudan	Iraq	Mission success: The crisis ended after the military coup against Abdul Karim Qasim and his execution.; Saudi Arabia forces were sent to Kuwait consisting of 1,281 Saudi soldiers..	~None		Abd Allah III
Al-Samita border skirmish (1973)	Kuwait	Iraq	Ceasefire: Pull back of Iraqi Armed Forces to the demarcation line set by the Arab League during Operation Vantage 1961.; Iraqi withdrawal from Al-Samita border post under Saudi pressure.	~2	~	Sabah III
October War (1973) (part of the Arab–Israeli conflict and the Cold War)	Egypt; Syria; Expeditionary forces Saudi Arabia Algeria Jordan Libya Iraq Kuwait Tunisia Morocco Cuba North Korea	Israel	Defeat: At the final ceasefire: Egyptian forces held 1,200 km^{2} (460 sq mi) on the eastern bank of the canal.; Israeli forces held 1,600 km^{2} (620 sq mi) on the western bank of the canal.; Israeli forces held 500 km^{2} (193 sq mi) of the Syrian Bashan region of the Golan Heights.	42	~	Sabah III
Invasion of Kuwait (1990) (part of the Gulf War)	Kuwait	Iraq	Iraqi victory: UNSC Resolution 660 condemns invasion on 2 August; UNSC Resolution 661 imposes international sanctions against Iraq and declares Kuwait's right to self-defence on 6 August; UNSC Resolution 662 designates Iraqi occupation/annexation of Kuwait as illegal on 9 August; UNSC Resolution 665 authorizes naval blockade against Iraq on 25 August; Iraq establishes the "Republic of Kuwait" on 2 August and annexes it on 28 August; Northern Kuwait becomes the Saddamiyat al-Mitla' District within Iraq's Basra Governorate; Southern Kuwait becomes Iraq's Kuwait Governorate	420	?	
Gulf War (1990–1991) (part of the Arab Cold War)	United States; United Kingdom; France; Saudi Arabia; Egypt; Kuwait; (United Nations) Coalition: Afghan mujahideen; Argentina; Australia; Bahrain; Bangladesh; Belgium; Canada; Czechoslovakia; Denmark; Germany; Greece; Honduras; Hungary; Italy; Japan; Luxembourg; Morocco; Netherlands; New Zealand; Niger; Norway; Oman; Pakistan; Philippines; Poland; Portugal; Qatar; Romania; Senegal; Sierra Leone; Singapore; South Korea; Spain; Sweden; Syria; Turkey; United Arab Emirates	Iraq	Coalition victory: State of Kuwait resumes self-governance over all Kuwaiti sovereign territory; Establishment of a demilitarized zone and construction of a separation barrier along the Iraq–Kuwait border	~200	~1,000	Jabir III
Yemeni Civil War (2015–present) (part of the Yemeni civil war and the Iran–Saudi Arabia proxy conflict)	Saudi Arabia The Alliance: United Arab Emirates Sudan (2015–19) Bahrain Kuwait South Korea (Note: soldiers not yet deployed in 2018 but did provided intel about Houthis) Qatar (2015–17) Egypt Jordan Morocco (2015–19) Senegal (Note: soldiers not yet deployed in 2016) Academi contractors (2015–16) Saudi-paid Yemeni mercenaries; Supported by: United States; U.S. Navy (Note: logistic support and assistance with the naval blockade of Houthi-held territories in October 2016); United States Army (Special Forces) United Kingdom (Note: training, intelligence, logistical support, weapons, and blockade up to 2017) France Canada South Korea; National Intelligence Service Malaysia Australia; In support of: Republic of Yemen (Presidential Leadership Council); Yemeni Armed Forces; Yemeni Air Force; Hirak; Popular Resistance Committee; Al-Islah Movement	Revolutionary Committee/Supreme Political Council: Houthi militants; Yemen Army (pro-Saleh and Houthis) (2015–17); Yemeni Republican Guard (2015–17); Allies: Iran (alleged by USA, denied by Iran) North Korea (according to USA and South Korea); Al-Qaeda: AQAP	Ongoing	~None		Sabah IV Nawaf I Mishal I
Direct Involvement in the Middle Eastern Crisis (2026-present): 2026 Iranian strikes on Kuwait	October 7 attacks: Israel Armed Israeli Citizens Gaza War & West Bank Incursions: Israel; Israeli-backed groups: Popular Forces; Fatah-affiliated groups; Defensive Only: Palestinian Authority Intelligence support during April & October Iranian strikes: USA; UAE; Saudi Arabia; Jordan (also intercepted attacks); Due to strikes by Iraqi militias (until 2024): USA; Israel; UK; Jordan; Rojava; (Syria) Al-Tanf; 2024 Kerman Bombings: Islamic State; Defensive during Iranian Retaliatory Strikes: Iraq; Ba'athist Syria: Pakistan; Jaysh al-Adl; Prosperity Guardian (until 2024): USA; United Kingdom; Australia; Bahrain; Canada; Denmark; New Zealand; Norway; Seychelles; Singapore; Sri Lanka; Aspides (until 2024): European Union; Independent Patrols (Red Sea Crisis): China; Egypt; India; Pakistan Saudi Arabia Syrian Civil War (until 2024): Hay'at Tahrir al-Sham (Syria) Southern Operations Room (Syria) Free Syrian Army (Syria) Syrian National Army; From 2024: Syria Twelve Day War: United States Israel Defensive only: Iraq; Jordan (also intercepted attacks); Saudi Arabia; Qatar; France; 2025-26 Iranian protests: Iranian opposition; Anti-government demonstrators; Student demonstrators; Police and military defectors; Armed civilians; Political groups: Iran National Council (INC); Mojahedin-e-Khalq (MEK); National Council of Resistance of Iran (NCRI); Solidarity for a Secular Democratic Republic in Iran; Separatist groups: Kurdish separatist; Democratic Party of Iranian Kurdistan; Kurdistan Freedom Party; Kurdistan Free Life Party; Xebat; Komalah; Revolutionary Toilers Association; Kurdistan Toilers Association; Kurdistan National Guard; Zagros Tornado units; Baloch separatists; People's Fighters Front; Balochistan People's Party; Azerbaijani separatists; South Azerbaijan Organisations Cooperation Council; Coordination Council of Azerbaijani Parties in Iran; Salafi Jihadists; Labour, civil, and retiree groups: Free Workers Union of Iran; Iranian Writers Association; Coordination Council of Iranian Teachers Trade Associations; Haft Tappeh Sugarcane Workers Syndicate; Coordination Committee to Help Form Independent Labour Organisations; Khuzestan Retired Workers; Union of Retirees Group; Kurdish Women's Organisations; Retirees Union; Kermanshah Electricity and Metal Association; "Stop Executions"; "Justice Seekers"; Coordination Council for Protests of Contract Oil Workers; Coordination Council for Protests of Non-Formal Oil Workers; Coordination Council of Nurses Protests; "Neday-e Zanan-e Iran"; World Iranian Christian Alliance; Supported by: United States (since 28 February 2026); Israel (since 28 February 2026); 2026 Iran War: Israel; United States; CPFIK (alleged and urged): Kurdistan Democratic Party of Iran (KDPI); Kurdistan Freedom Party (PAK); Kurdistan Free Life Party (PJAK); Organization of Iranian Kurdistan Struggle (Khabat); Komala of the Toilers of Kurdistan; Komala Party of Iranian Kurdistan; Attacked by Iran: Azerbaijan; Bahrain; Iraq; Kurdistan Region; Jordan; Kuwait; NATO; Turkey; (United Kingdom) Akrotiri and Dhekelia (Note: The United Kingdom has also undertaken defensive deployments outside of Akrotiri and Dhekelia); Oman; Qatar; Saudi Arabia; Syria; United Arab Emirates; Defensive actions: France; Greece; Italy; Netherlands; Spain; Anti-Iranian Protestors (outside Iran)	Iran Ba'athist Syria (until 2024); Axis of Resistance: Hamas; Palestinian Islamic Jihad; Popular Front for the Liberation of Palestine; Democratic Front for the Liberation of Palestine; Al-Aqsa Martyrs' Brigades; Palestinian Mujahideen Movement; Palestinian Freedom Movement; Popular Resistance Committees; Popular Front for the Liberation of Palestine – General Command: Houthi Yemen; Yemeni Navy (SPC faction); Houthis; Hezbollah; Amal Movement; Islamic Group Islamic Resistance in Iraq: Popular Mobilization Forces; Kata'ib Hezbollah; Harakat al-Nujaba; Kata'ib Sayyid ul-Shuhada; Badr Organisation; Syrian Social Nationalist Party Intelligence Support: Russia Syrian Civil War (until 2024): Ba'athist Syria; Russia; From 2024: Assadist insurgents Defensive during Israeli invasion of Lebanon: Lebanon; UN Defensive stances on attacks by Israel and allies: Lebanon; Yemen; Sri Lanka Pro-Iranian protestors (outside Iran)	Ongoing: 2026 Iran War: Ongoing On 28 February 2026, during the 2026 Iran war, Iran began launching a series of retaliatory strikes on American and Kuwaiti targets within Kuwait.	4	4	Mishal Al-Ahmad Al-Jaber Al-Sabah

== Bibliography ==
- Slot, B.J. (2005). Mubarak Al-Sabah : Founder of Modern Kuwait 1896-1915. London: Arabian Publishing Ltd. ISBN 978-0-9544792-4-4.
