= Crown Prince of Kuwait =

Heir apparent to the Emir of Kuwait

- ولي العهد الكويت
- Arms of His Highness the Crown Prince of Kuwait

Incumbent
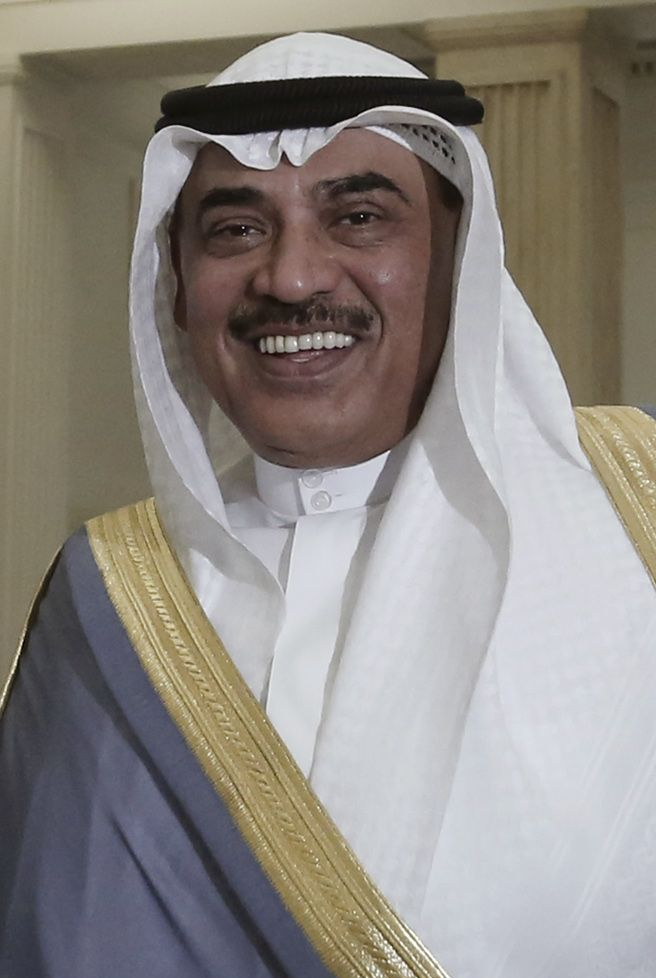
- Sabah Al-Khalid Al-Sabah since 2 June 2024

Details
- Style: His Highness
- First monarch: Sabah Al-Salim Al-Sabah
- Formed: 29 October 1962
- Residence: Bayan Palace

The Crown Prince of the State of Kuwait is the heir apparent to the Emir of Kuwait. Under Article 4 of the Constitution of Kuwait, this position can only be held by the descendants of Sheikh Mubarak Al-Sabah, and must be designated within a year of the Emir's accession. This designation is given effect by a combination of the Emir's nomination, and its approval by the National Assembly, as signified by a majority vote of its members in a special sitting. If this does not happen, the Constitution requires the Emir to nominate three descendants of Sheikh Mubarak Al-Sabah, of whom the National Assembly will pledge allegiance to one as the Crown Prince or heir apparent. To be appointed, the nominee must also have attained the age of majority, be of sound mind, and be the legitimate son of Muslim parents.

There are three successional customs which influence the choice of Crown Prince. First, the pick alternates between descendants of two of Sheikh Mubarak Al-Sabah's sons: Jaber II Al-Sabah and Salim Al-Mubarak Al-Sabah (until 2006, when a Salim emir was overthrown, and 2024, when a descendant of Hamad Al-Mubarak was chosen). Second, the Crown Prince is chosen by the Family Council, from among other elder members of the royal family. Third, the matter of succession is a family affair and kept secret. As such, it is not open to public debate.

== Crown Princes of Kuwait (1962–present) ==
Name	Lifespan	Reign start	Reign end	Notes	Family	Image
Sheikh; Sabah Al-Salim Al-Sabah: صباح السالم الصباح	12 April 1913 – 31 December 1977 (aged 64)	29 October 1962	24 November 1965	Youngest son of Salim Al-Mubarak Al-Sabah	Al Sabah	Sabah Al-Salim Al-Sabah of Kuwait
Sheikh; Jaber Al-Ahmad Al-Sabah: جابر الأحمد الصباح	29 June 1926 – 15 January 2006 (aged 79)	31 May 1966	31 December 1977	Third son of Ahmad Al-Jaber Al-Sabah	Al Sabah	Jaber Al-Ahmad Al-Sabah of Kuwait
Sheikh; Saad Al-Abdullah Al-Salim Al-Sabah (Note: In exile in Taif, Saudi Arabia between 2 August 1990 and 15 March 1991, due to the Iraqi invasion and occupation, and the subsequent Gulf War.): سعد العبد الله السالم الصباح	13 May 1930 – 13 May 2008 (aged 78)	18 February 1978	15 January 2006	Eldest son of Abdullah Al-Salim Al-Sabah	Al Sabah	Saad Al-Abdullah Al-Salim Al-Sabah of Kuwait
Sheikh; Nawaf Al-Ahmad Al-Jaber Al-Sabah: نواف الأحمد الجابر الصباح	25 June 1937 – 16 December 2023 (aged 86)	20 February 2006	29 September 2020	Sixth son of Ahmad Al-Jaber Al-Sabah	Al Sabah	Nawaf Al-Ahmad Al-Jaber Al-Sabah of Kuwait
Sheikh; Mishal Al-Ahmad Al-Jaber Al-Sabah: مشعل الأحمد الجابر الصباح	27 September 1940 (age 86)	8 October 2020	16 December 2023	Seventh son of Ahmad Al-Jaber Al-Sabah	Al Sabah	Mishal Al-Ahmad Al-Jaber Al-Sabah of Kuwait
Sheikh; Sabah Al-Khalid Al-Hamad Al-Sabah: صباح الخالد الحمد الصباح	3 March 1953 (age 73)	2 June 2024	Incumbent	Half-nephew of Mishal Al-Ahmad Al-Jaber Al-Sabah. First Crown Prince from the Al-Hamad branch of the family	Al Sabah	Sabah Al-Khalid Al-Hamad Al-Sabah of Kuwait

== See also ==
- Politics of Kuwait
