= Al-Hasa Expedition (1871) =

Ottoman military campaign to invade the Al-Hasa region

Al-Hasa Expedition Arabic: حملة الاحساء
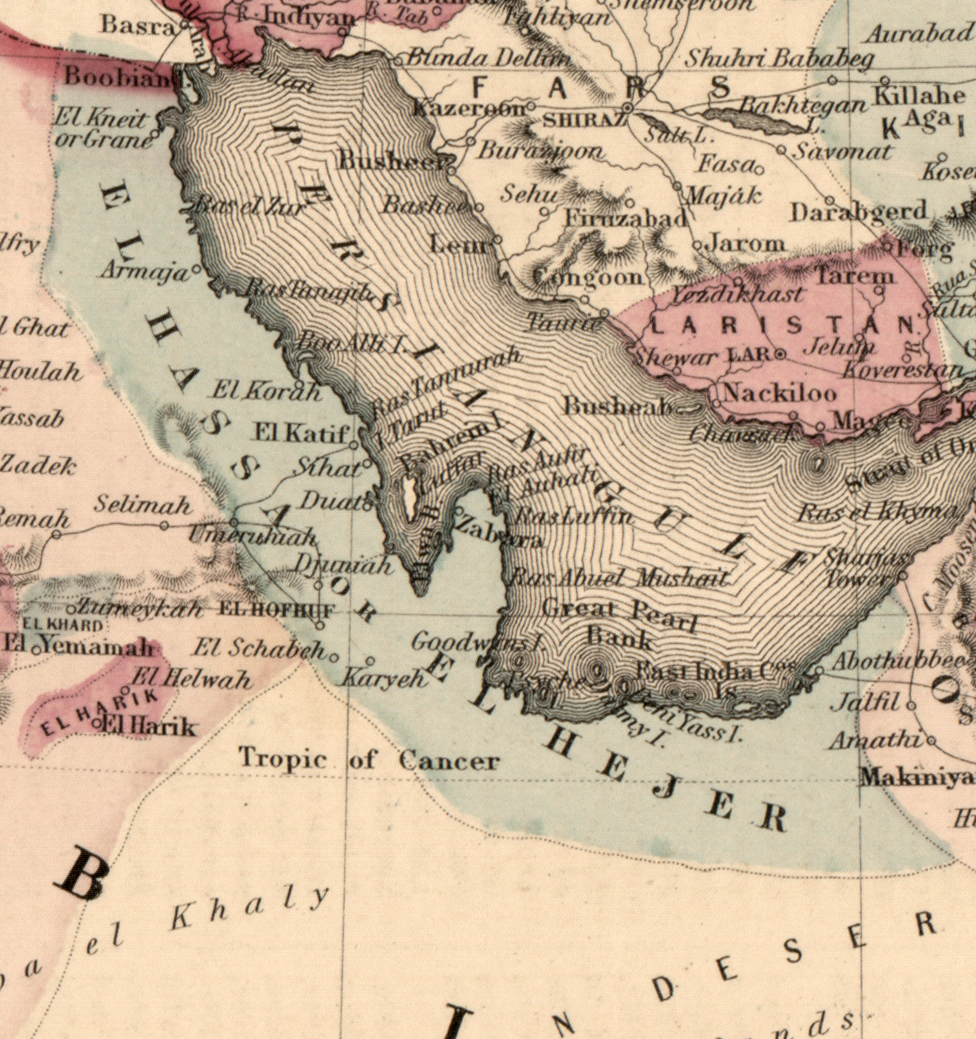
| Date | 20 April – 3 June 1871 |
| Location | al-Hasa (now al-Ahsa Governorate, Saudi Arabia) |
| Result | Ottoman–Muntafiq–Kuwaiti victory |

Belligerents
| Ottoman Empire; Al-Muntafiq; Sheikhdom of Kuwait; Emirate of Qatar | Emirate of Nejd |

Commanders and leaders
| (Ottoman Empire) Midhat Pasha; (Ottoman Empire) Nafiz Pasha; (Ottoman Empire) Arif Bey; Nasser Pasha; Abdullah II Al-Sabah; Mubarak Al-Sabah; Mohammed bin Thani | Saud bin Faisal (surrendered) |

Strength
| 10,000: Most of them are from Iraqi tribes | 25,000 |

The Al-Hasa Expedition was an Ottoman military campaign to annex the Al-Hasa region of eastern Arabia. Ostensibly launched to assist Imam Abdullah bin Faisal in reclaiming control over Najd from his brother Saud bin Faisal, the underlying motive was Medhat Pasha's ambition to extend Ottoman dominion over the Persian Gulf.

== Background ==
Several months into his reign, on March 29, 1871, Imam Abdullah bin Faisal dispatched his envoy Abdul Aziz bin Suwailem to Midhat Pasha, the Ottoman governor of Baghdad, seeking assistance in the conflict against his brother Saud bin Faisal. Saud controlled the regions of Al-Ahsa and Qatif, territories that had been wrested from Imam Abdullah bin Faisal.

== Progress of the campaign ==
The campaign departed Basra on April 20, comprising five infantry columns, a cavalry division and artillery units under the command of Lieutenant General Naser Pasha. Accompanying the force was the Sheikh of Al-Muntafiq, leading approximately 1,000 volunteer horsemen from his tribe. Additional men from various other Iraqi tribes convened in the town of Az Zubayr. Muhammad Saeed Effendi, son of the captain of supervision in Basra, also joined the commander in the expedition.

A naval contingent from Kuwait joined the campaign, provided by the ruler of Kuwait, Sheikh Abdullah II Al-Sabah, who personally led a fleet of eighty ships. The fleet arrived at Ras Tanura on May 13, 1871, coinciding with the Ottoman infantry's land march towards Al-Ahsa. From Ras Tanura, the forces progressed towards Qatif, engaging in fierce battles with Saud bin Faisal's supporters, resulting in Qatif's capture on June 3, 1871. Subsequently, the campaign advanced to Dammam then to Hofuf.

== Outcome ==
Following the Ottoman conquest of Al-Ahsa, Midhat Pasha reneged on his commitment to Imam Abdullah bin Faisal, and the province of Al-Ahsa was separated from the second Saudi state. Al Hasa was reincorporated into the Ottoman Empire and became known as the Najd Sanjak. For his significant contributions to the campaign, Sheikh Abdullah II Al-Sabah the ruler of Kuwait was bestowed the honorific title of Kaymakam by the Ottoman authorities.

== Bibliography ==
- Anscombe, Frederick F. (1997). The Ottoman Gulf: The Creation of Kuwait, Saudi Arabia, and Qatar. New York: Columbia University Press. ISBN 978-0-231-10839-3.
