= Jabir ibn Abdullah =

Jabir ibn Abdullah is the name of:

- Jabir ibn Abd-Allah (c. 607 – c. 697), a prominent companion of Muhammad and his descendants, the Shi'a Imams
- Jaber I Al-Sabah (1770–1859), son of Abdullah bin Sabah
