= Anglo-Kuwaiti Agreement of 1899 =

1899 treaty between the United Kingdom and Kuwait

The Anglo-Kuwaiti Agreement of 1899 was a secret treaty signed between the British Empire and the Sheikhdom of Kuwait on 23 January 1899. Under its provisions Britain pledged to protect the territorial integrity of Kuwait in return for restricting the access of foreign powers to the Sheikhdom and regulating its internal affairs.

== Background ==
The Sheikhdom of Kuwait emerged in the mid 18th century. At times it was obliged to take the role of a tributary state to the Ottoman Empire. Following their successful 1871 Najd expedition, the Ottomans solidified their influence over Kuwait. In 1892, Muhammad Al-Sabah ascended to the Kuwaiti throne. Mohammad's ineptitude as a ruler led to a gradual emergence of his brother in law Yusuf bin Abdullah Al–Ibrahim as an éminence grise. Al–Ibrahim went on to pursue Turkophile policies, which alienated the nationalist circles of Kuwait's society. In May 1896, Mohammad was assassinated by his half brother Mubarak Al-Sabah who then seized power. The Ottomans believed that the revolt was a part of a larger British plot to create a Pan-Arab anti-Ottoman alliance. The Ottomans cited Mubarak's meeting with the British Resident at Bushehr shortly before the coup, further claiming that Jasim bin Thani of Qatar and Amir Mohammed bin Rashid of Ha'il were also part of the alliance. The Resident denied those allegations.

Fearing that Sabah's two sons might seek revenge, Mubarak requested the Ottomans to grant him the title of Kaymakam in order to get rid of his status as usurper. Hamdi Pasha the governor general of the adjacent Basra Vilayet refused, instead proposing the annexation of Kuwait to his superiors. At a critical moment Hamdi Pasha was replaced with Mohsin Pasha, whom Mubarak managed to win over with bribes. At a time when British influence in Kuwait was seemingly at its nadir Mubarak approached the British consul at Basra with an appeal for British protection. The British initially appeared reluctant as such a move would have most probably resulted in a conflict of interest with other great powers such as France and Russia. The situation changed when Russian entrepreneur Vladimir Kapnist laid out his plan to erect a railway connecting the Mediterranean port of Tripoli with Kuwait. Seeing this plan as detrimental to their interests in Mesopotamia, the British returned to the negotiating table.

== Treaty ==
On 23 January 1899, Mubarak and British representative Meade signed the secret Anglo–Kuwaiti Agreement of 1899. Under its terms the Sheikh and his successors agreed not to receive foreign agents or representatives while also barring them from selling, leasing, mortgaging or ceding any portion of the territory under his control to a foreign government or citizen without prior British consent. In return the British were to grant the Kuwaiti Sheikh the sum of 1,000 pounds sterling on an annual basis, furthermore Britain pledged to protect the territorial integrity of Kuwait against external threats.

== Aftermath ==
The 1899 treaty was followed by a number of minor agreements that cemented Britain's role in the country, including the management of its pearling and oil resources. In the following years Britain thwarted several Ottoman attempts to reestablish their control over Kuwait both through diplomatic and military endeavors. In 1904, captain S.G. Knox was appointed as the first British Resident in Kuwait. The status of the aforementioned treaties was later confirmed with the Anglo-Ottoman Convention of 1913.
