= Muhammad bin Sabah Al-Sabah =

Ruler of Kuwait from 1892 to 1896

- Pasha

6th Ruler of Kuwait
- Reign: May 1892 – 1896
- Predecessor: Abdullah II
- Successor: Mubarak I
- Born: 1838; Sheikhdom of Kuwait
- Died: 17 May 1896 (aged 57–58)
- Issue: Ali; Sabah; Saud; Khalid; Athbi; Latifa; Sabika
- House: Sabah
- Father: Sabah II
- Mother: a daughter of Emir Muhammad bin Ibrahim Al Thaqib

Muhammad bin Sabah Al-Sabah (Arabic: الشيخ محمد بن صباح الصباح; 1838 – 17 May 1896) also known as Noor Al Sabah, was the sixth ruler of the Sheikhdom of Kuwait between May 1892 and May 1896 during which he held the title of Pasha from the Ottoman Sultan. He was the second son of Sabah II Al-Sabah and succeeded his half-brother Abdullah II Al-Sabah upon his death in 1892.

When Muhammad came to power, disagreements soon arose between him and his half-brother Mubarak. Muhammad dealt with this by occupying Mubarak with foreign affairs, dispatching him to Hasa with an Ottoman force, and to the desert in order to settle affairs amongst tribes without providing funding.

In 1896, Mubarak summoned his sons Jaber and Salim, and some supporters, and rode to Kuwait where they secretly entered Muhammad's house. Muhammad and his brother Jarrah were assassinated in his house by Mubarak Al-Sabah on 17 May 1896.

Following the assassination, Mubarak would become the ruler of Kuwait and the sons of Muhammad and Jarrah were exiled to al Zubayr, staying there until 1921.

Muhammad bin Sabah Al-Sabah House of Sabah Born: 1831 Died: 17 May 1896
Regnal titles
Preceded by Abdullah II Al-Sabah	Sheikh of Kuwait; 1892–1896	Succeeded by Mubarak Al-Sabah
