= Kuwait National Guard =

- الحرس الوطني الكويتي
- Kuwait National Guard
- Active: 1967; 59 years ago
- Country: Kuwait
- Type: Paramilitary; Gendarmerie; Reserve army Border guard
- Role: Expeditionary warfare Special operations Special reconnaissance Counterterrorism; Border control
- Size: Approx. 15000 personnel 12000 reserves
- Part of: Kuwait Armed Forces
- Garrison/HQ: Kuwait
- Nickname: His Highness Elite
- Mottos: الله والوطن والامير; God, Country & The Emir
- Colors: Green & Yellow
- Anniversaries: National and Liberation Day (25 and 26 February)
- Engagements: 1973 Samita border skirmish; Yom Kippur War; Iran–Iraq War; Gulf War; Invasion of Kuwait; Operation Desert Storm; Operation Southern Watch; 1994 October Crisis; Operation Desert Fox; War on terror; Iraq War; Yemeni Civil War (2014–present); Saudi Arabian-led intervention in Yemen; 2026 Iran War

Commanders
- His Highness National Guard Commander: Mubarak Humoud Al-Jaber Al-Sabah

Insignia
- Flag of the Kuwait National Guard

The Kuwait National Guard (KNG) (Arabic: الحرس الوطني الكويتي) is a paramilitary and gendarmerie branch of the Kuwait Armed Forces. The National Guard is an independent combat institution and traces its heritage directly to the cavalrymen and infantrymen that defended Kuwait's three mounted defensive walls. Since its inception, the Kuwait National Guard under the guidance of the respective leadership; executed, participated in, and supported carrying out all conflicts in which the Kuwait Armed Forces have engaged since 1967.

== History ==
The founding of the Kuwait National Guard was first conceived during the Six-Day War and following the outcomes of Operation Vantage when Sheikh Jaber Al-Ahmad Al-Sabah was the Crown Prince of Kuwait through the 2nd decree of 1967 on June 6 during the reign of the Emir of Kuwait, Sheikh Sabah Al-Salim Al-Sabah. A mission for this purpose was led by Sheikh Salem Ali Al-Salem Al-Sabah, who was the driving force in forming the various task forces within the National Guard and who has remained at the head of the institution since its enacting in 1967.

== Leadership ==
=== National Guard Commander ===
#	Name	Title	Tenure	Note	Picture
1	Salem Al-Ali Al-Sabah	His Highness Commander of Kuwait National Guard	1967–2024	Most senior serving member and Chieftain dean of the House of Sabah
2	Mubarak Humoud Al-Jaber Al-Sabah	His Highness Commander of Kuwait National Guard	2024-Present	Senior ruling family member from the Jaber line

=== Deputy National Guard Commanders ===
#
Name
Rank
Tenure
Note
Picture
1
Nawaf Al-Ahmad Al-Jaber Al-Sabah
Deputy National Guard Commander
1994–2003
The Crown Prince of Kuwait (2006–2020)
The Emir of Kuwait (2020–2023)

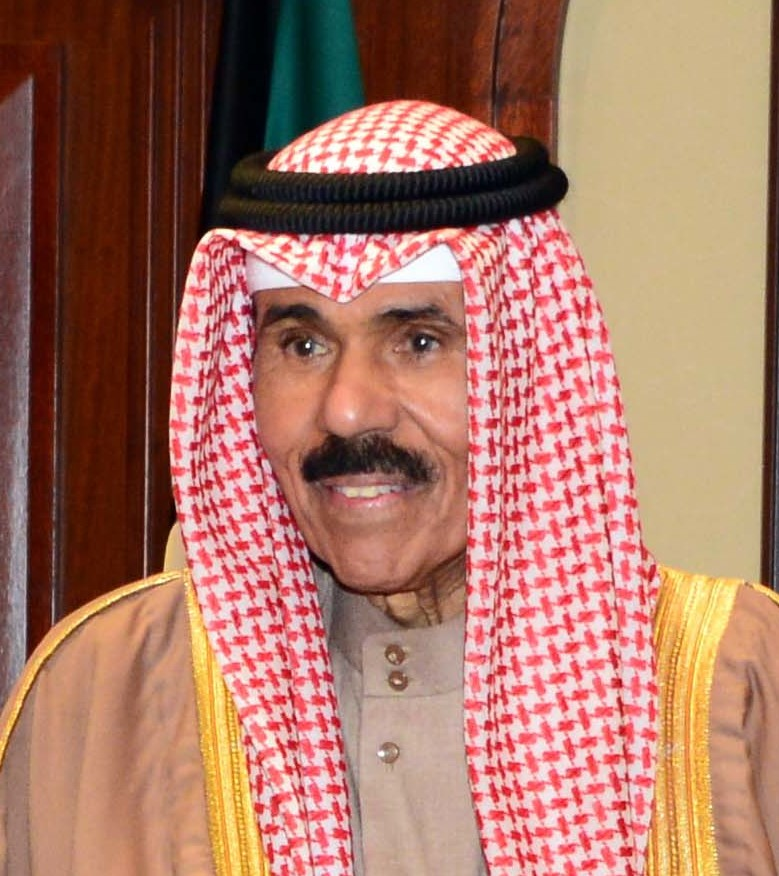

2
Mishal Al-Ahmad Al-Jaber Al-Sabah
Deputy National Guard Commander
2004–2020
The Crown Prince of Kuwait (2020–2023)
Emir of Kuwait (2023–present)

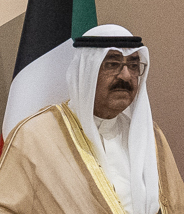

3
Ahmed Nawaf Al-Ahmed Al-Sabah
Deputy National Guard Commander
2020–2022
Prime Minister of Kuwait (2022–2023)

4
Faisal Nawaf Al-Ahmed Al-Sabah
Deputy National Guard Commander
2022–present
Undersecretary of the Ministry of Interior (2021–2022)

== Golden Jubilee ==
=== 50th Anniversary of the Kuwait National Guard ===
In June 2017, the Kuwait National Guard commemorated their 50th Anniversary Golden jubilee under the leadership of the Commander-in-chief, the Emir of Kuwait, and directives of Sheikh Salem Al-Ali Al-Sabah.

== Ranks ==
Officers

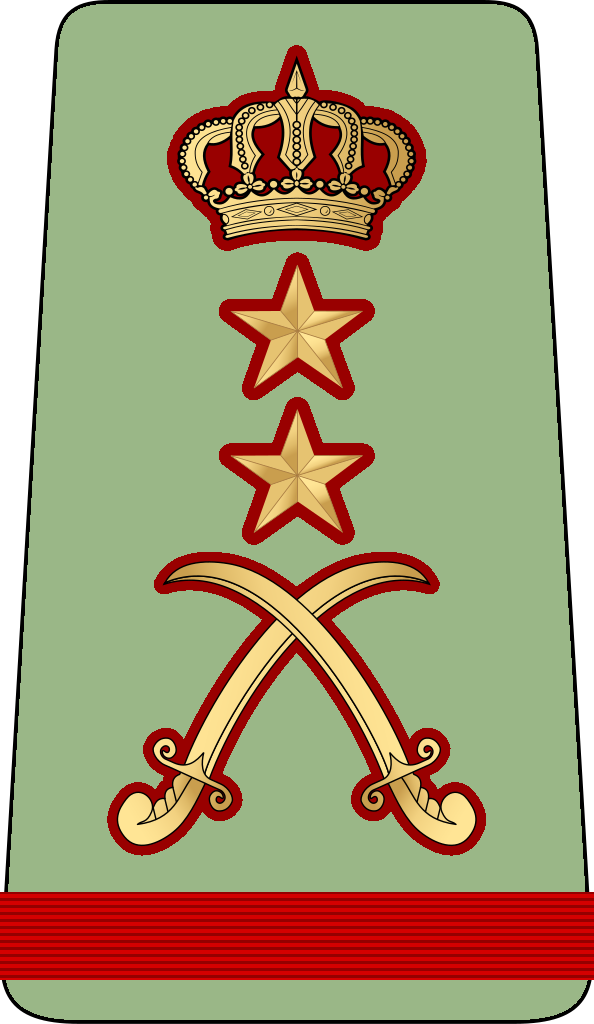
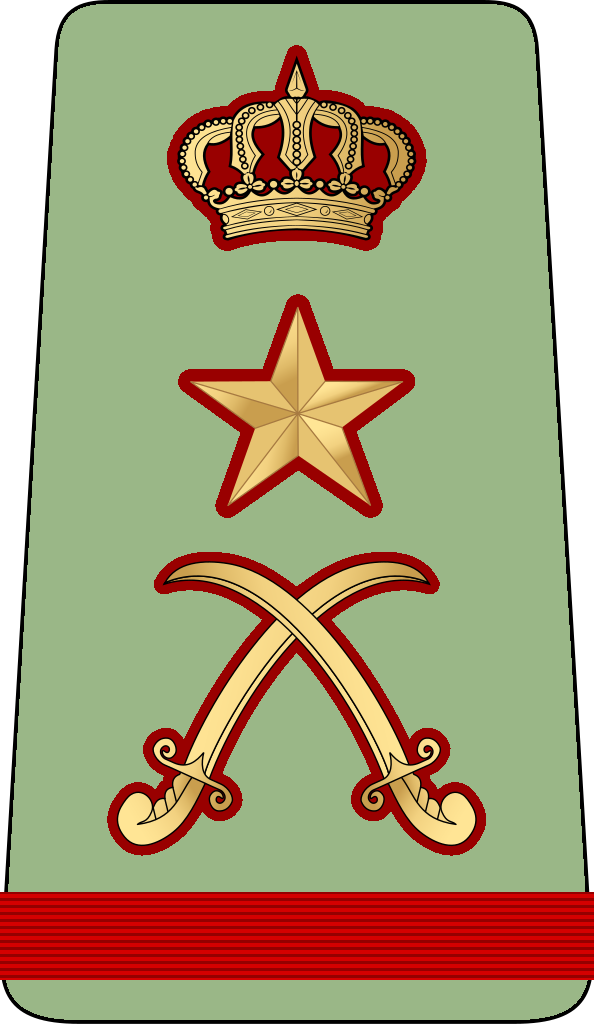
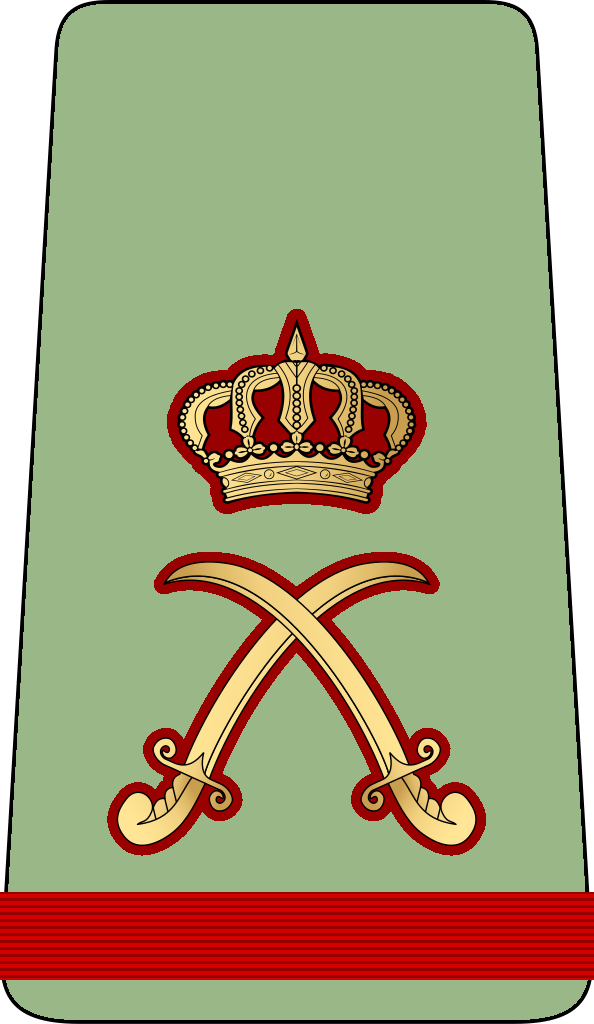
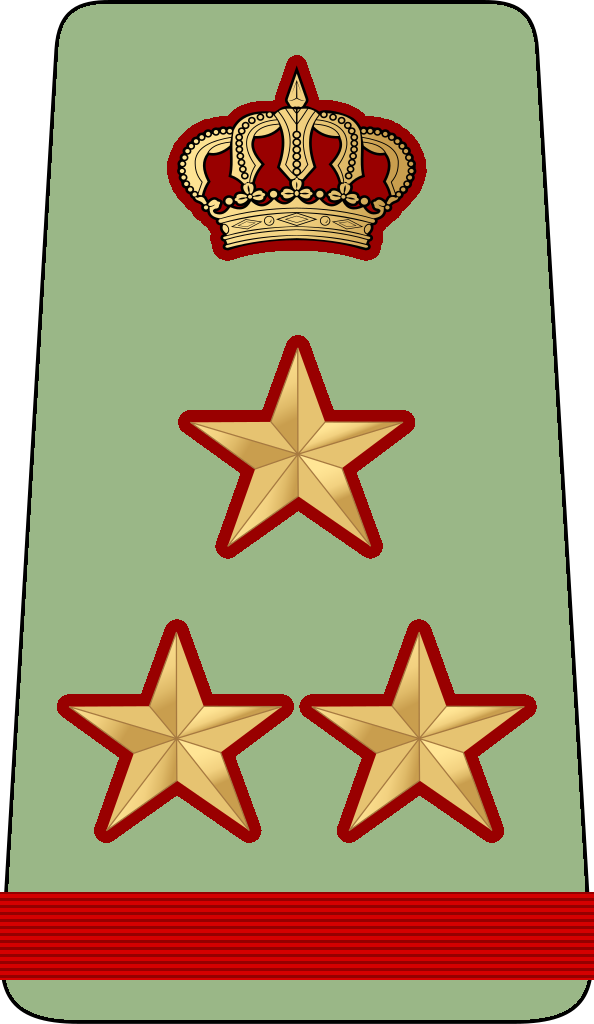
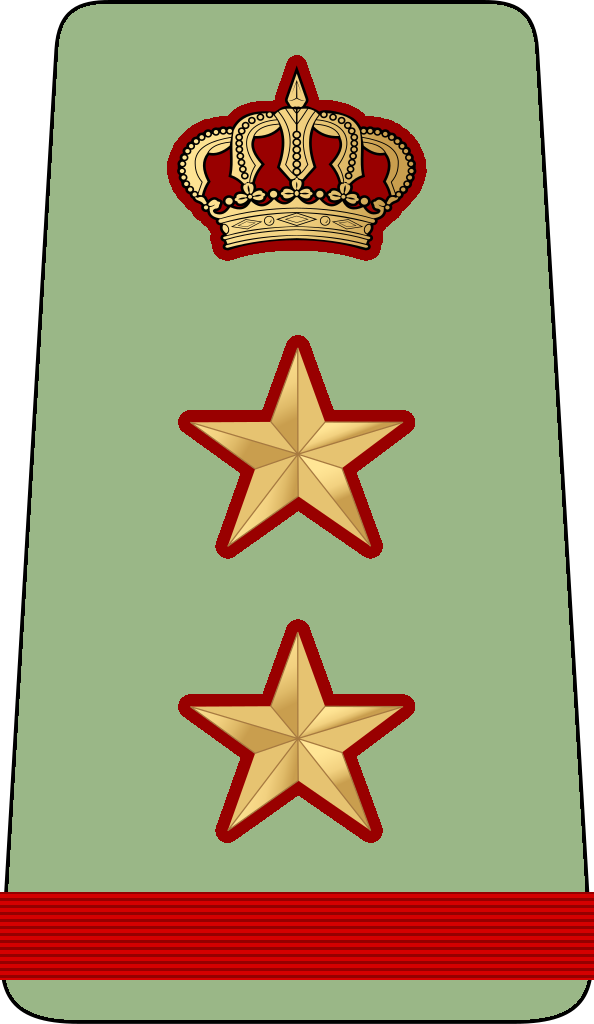
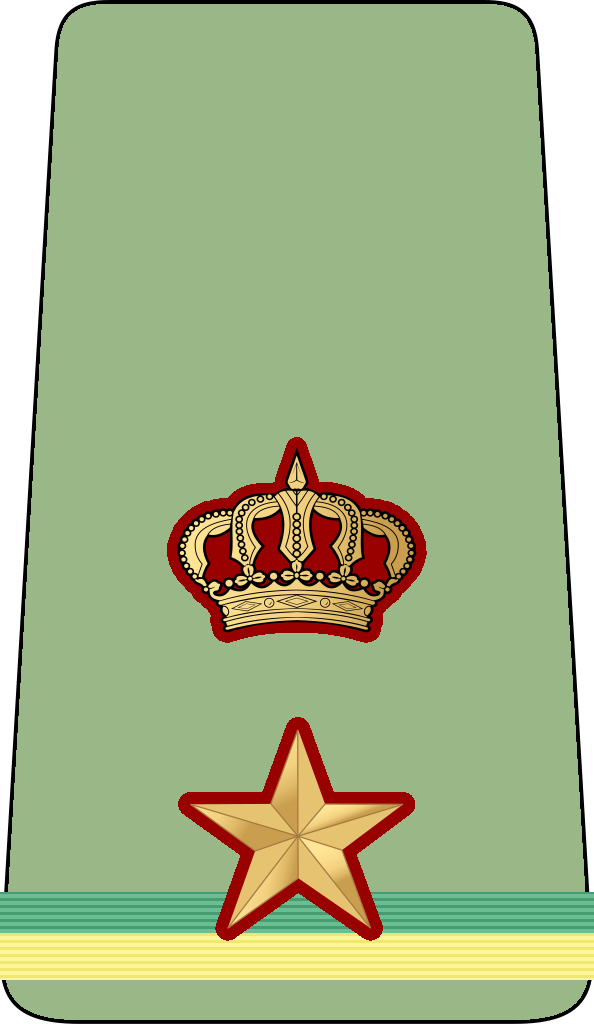
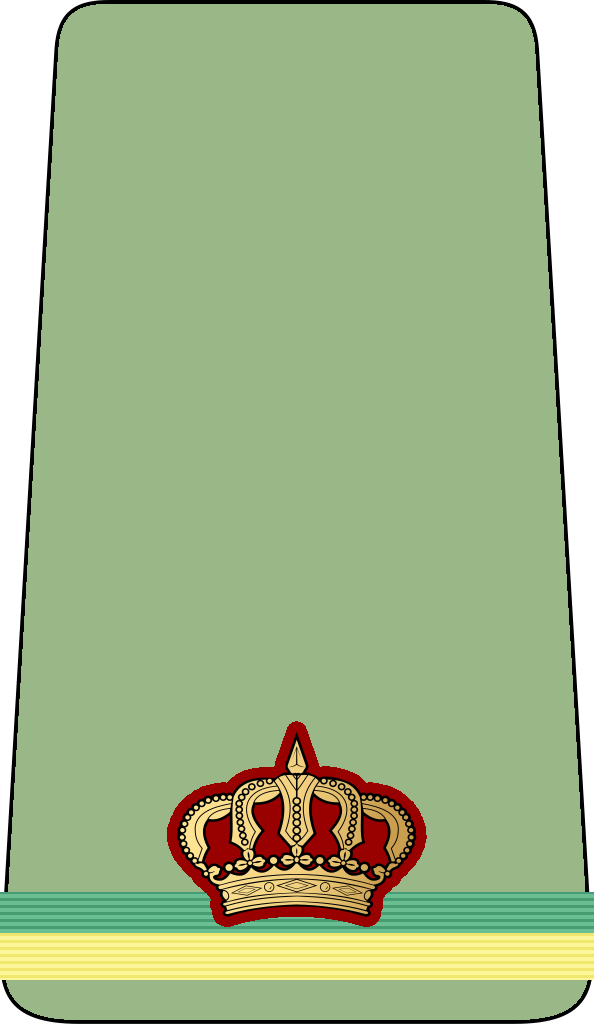
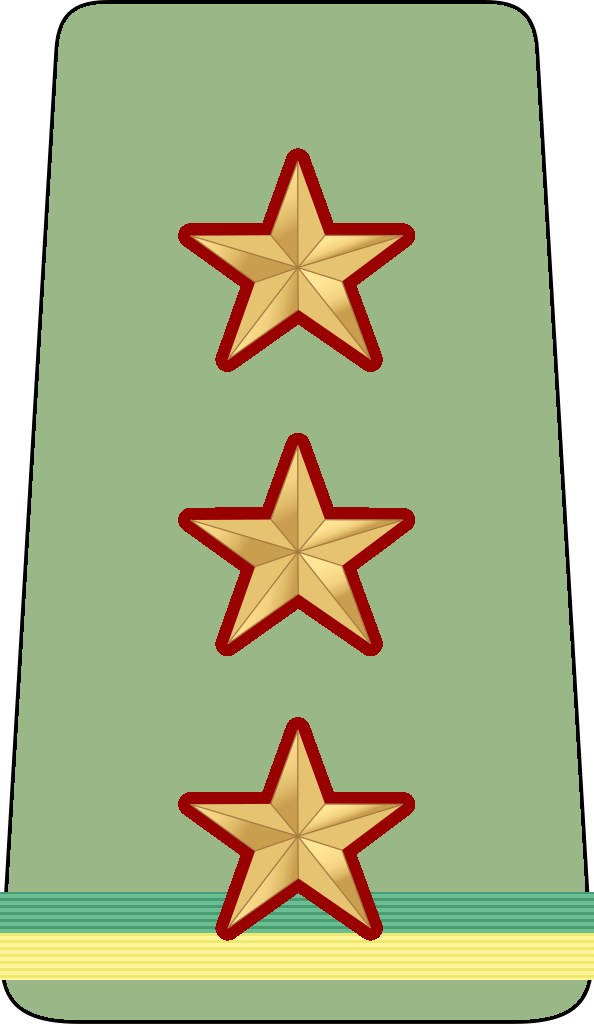
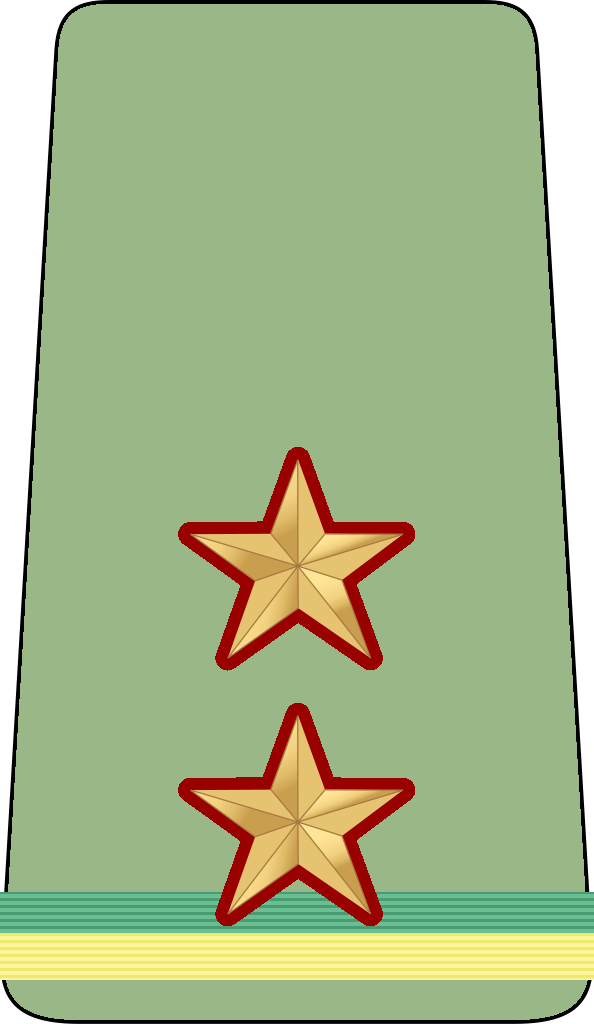
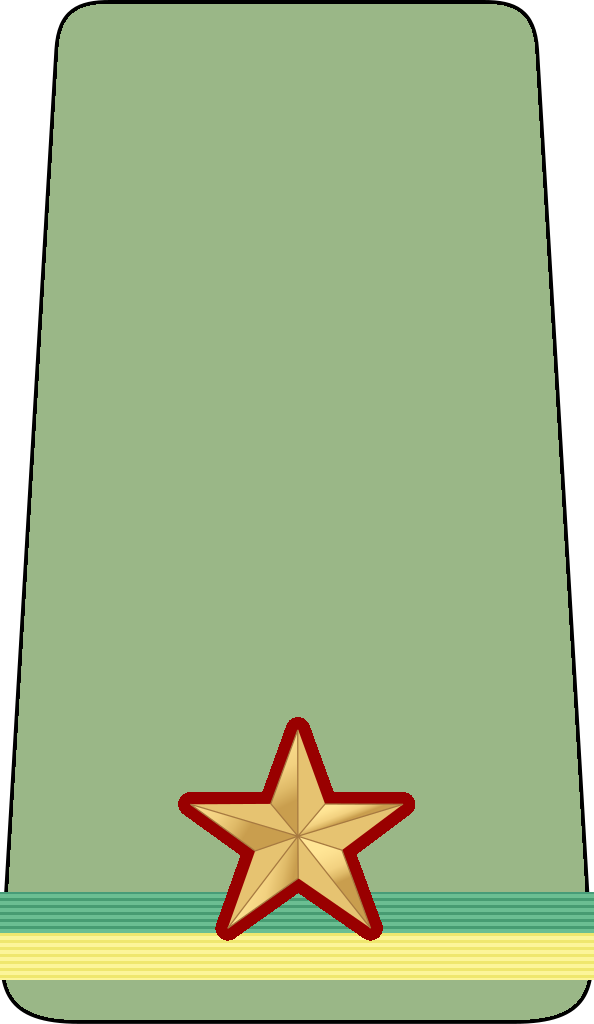
Rank group	General / flag officers				Senior officers			Junior officers
Kuwait National Guard
Kuwait National Guard	فريق أول; Fariq 'awal	فريق; Fariq	لواء; Liwa	عميد; Amid	عقيد; Aqid	مقدم; Muqaddam	رائد; Ra'id	نقيب; Naqib	ملازم أول; Mulazim awwal	ملازم; Mulazim

Enlisted

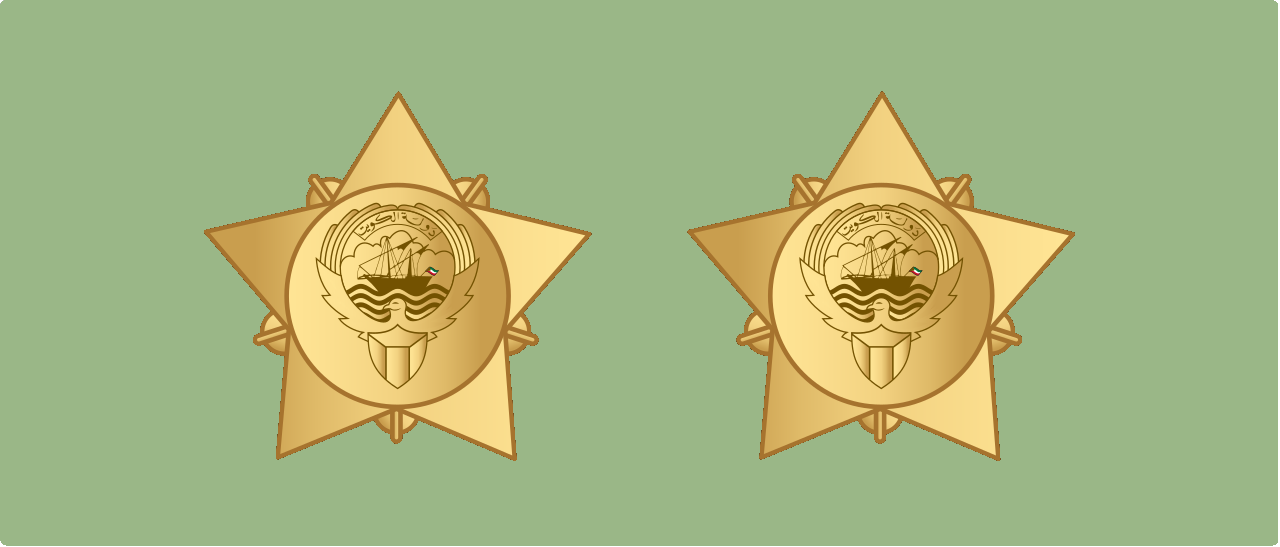
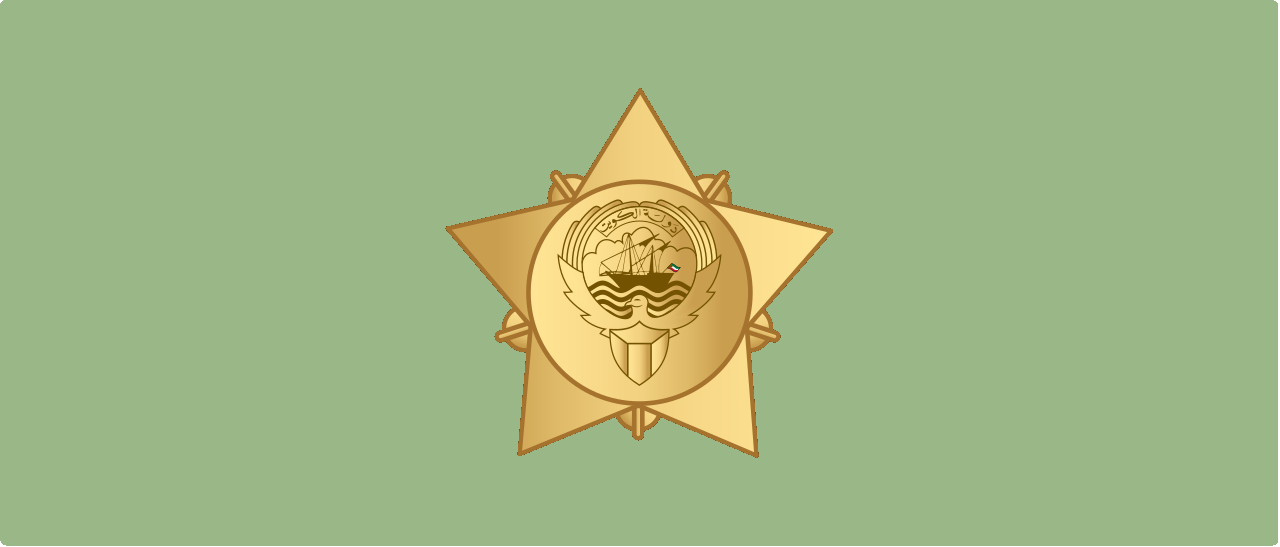
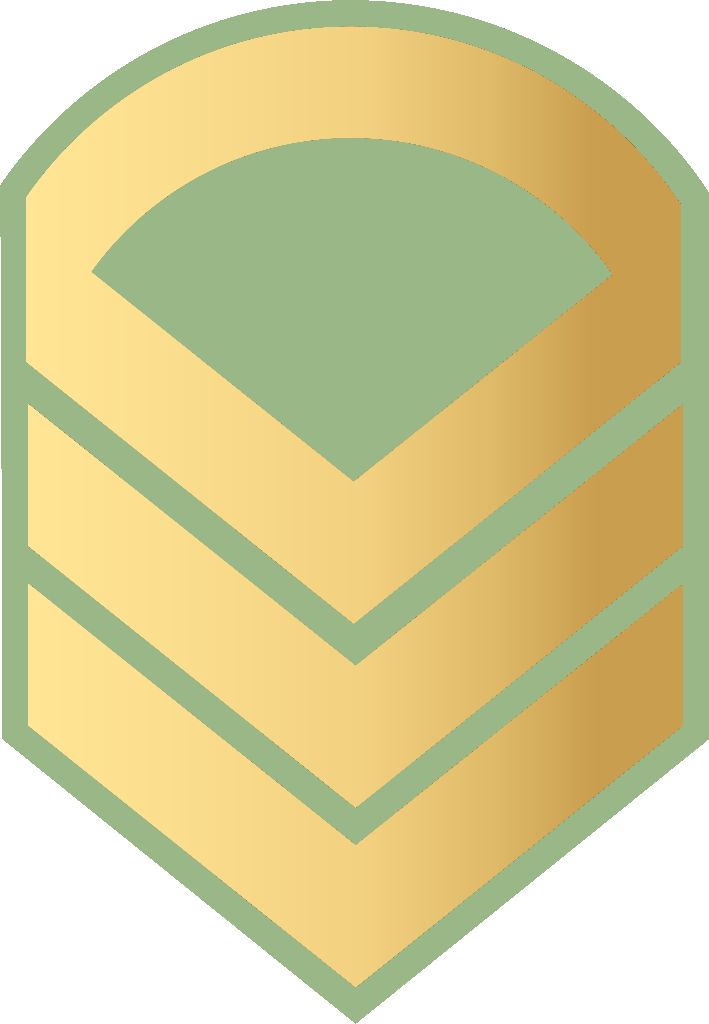
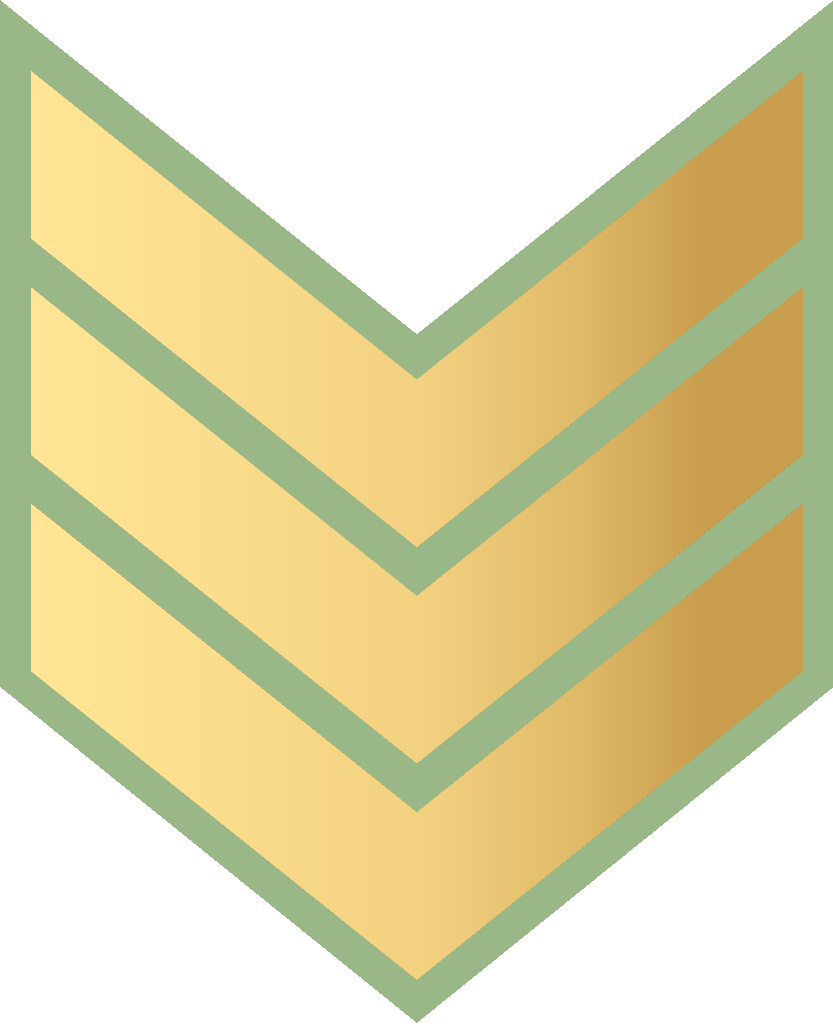
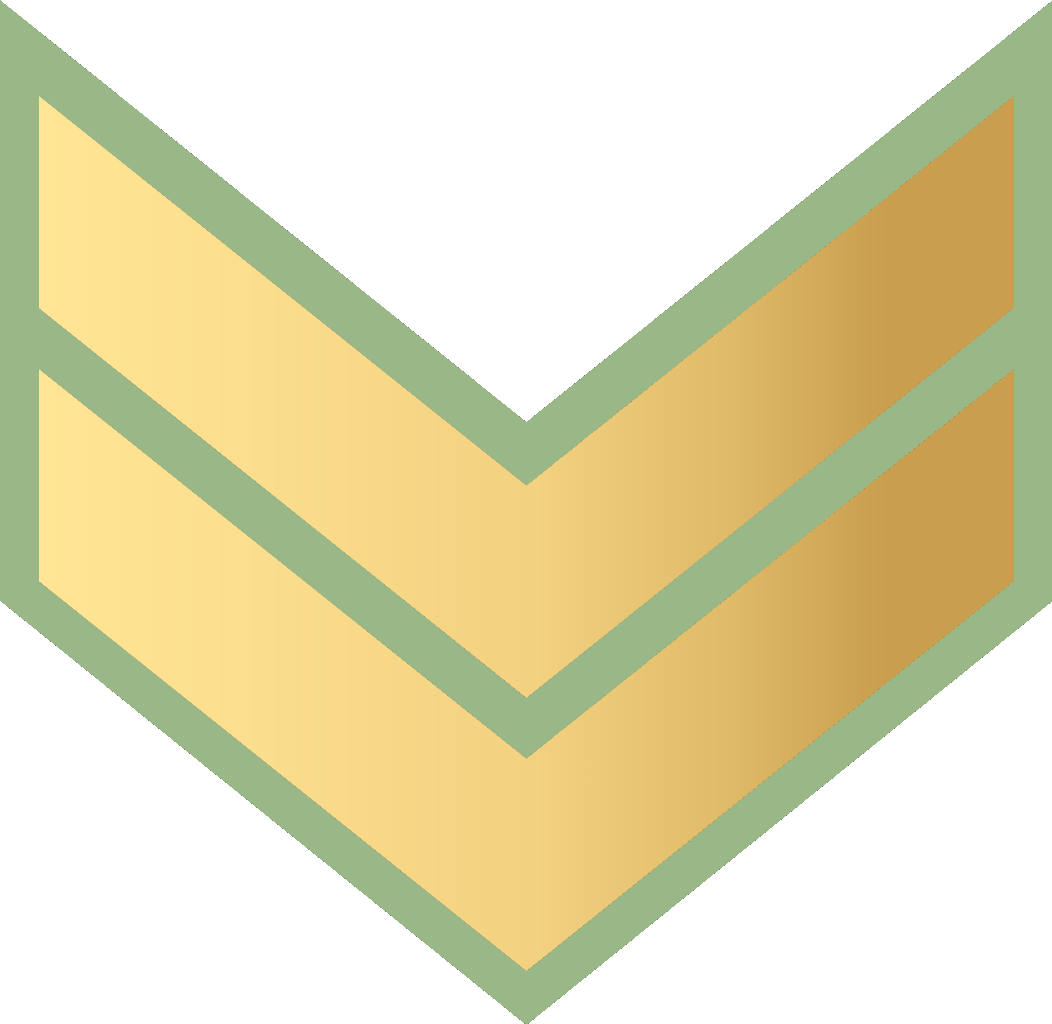
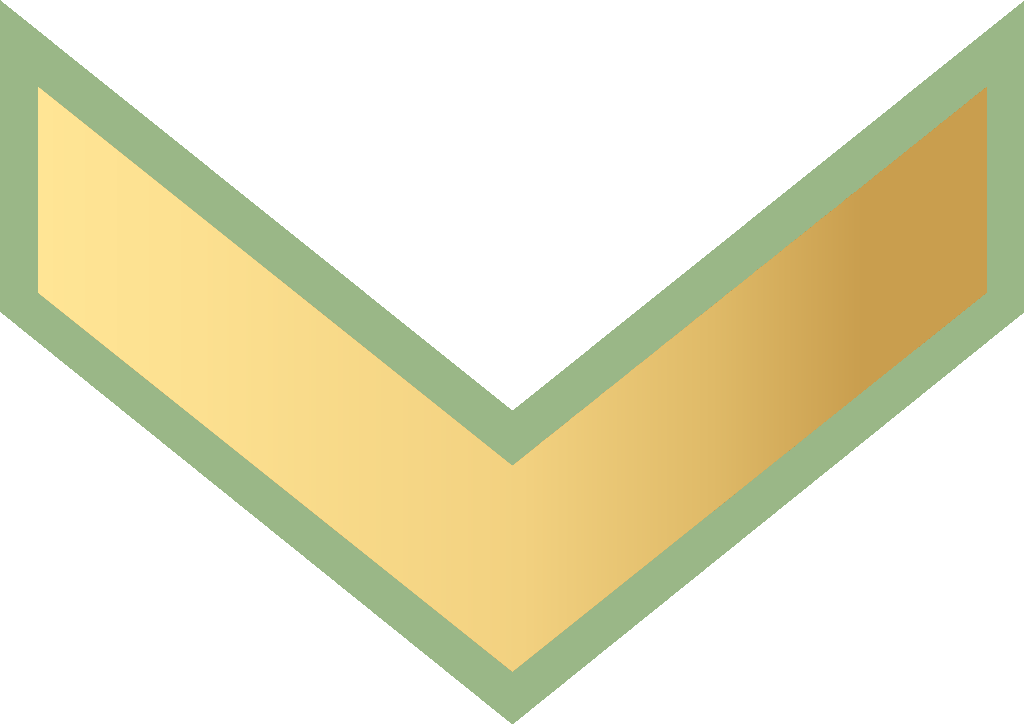
Rank group	Senior NCOs				Junior NCOs	Enlisted
Kuwait National Guard							No insignia
Kuwait National Guard	وكيل أول; Wakil 'awal	وكيل; Wakil	رقيب أول; Raqib 'awal	رقیب; Raqib	عريف; Earif	جندي أول; Jundiun awwal	جندي; Jundiun

== Equipment ==
=== Armored Fighting Vehicles ===
Name	Type	Quantity	Country of origin	Notes
Pandur	Armoured Personnel Carrier	150	Austria	70 in 6 versions. Some with 90mm cockerill turret first entered service 1997 (produced by AV Technology) 80 Pandur II with a 25mm Bushmaster turret
Desert Chameleon	Armoured Personnel Carrier	20	United States	6×6 APC with 30 mm cannon. First entered service 2011
Condor (APC)	Armoured Personnel Carrier	8	West Germany	Kuwait owns the advanced version (Condor II)
Shorland S600	Armoured Personnel Carrier	22	United Kingdom	22 in 5 versions (APC, CPV, ambulance, crowd control and mortar carrier)
Véhicule Blindé Léger	Armoured Personnel Carrier	97	France	
Sherpa light Scout	Multipurpose Wheeled Vehicle	+300	France	Initial order of 240 Sherpas sold to Kuwait National Guard in 2015, followed by another order. Sherpa Scouts also sold to the Kuwaiti military in 2016 under a €270 m contract.
Humvee	Multipurpose Wheeled Vehicle	2,300	United States	Vehicles sold via the U.S. Foreign Military Sales program.
