= Mubarak Abdullah Al-Ahmad Al-Sabah =

Kuwaiti politician (1930–2023)

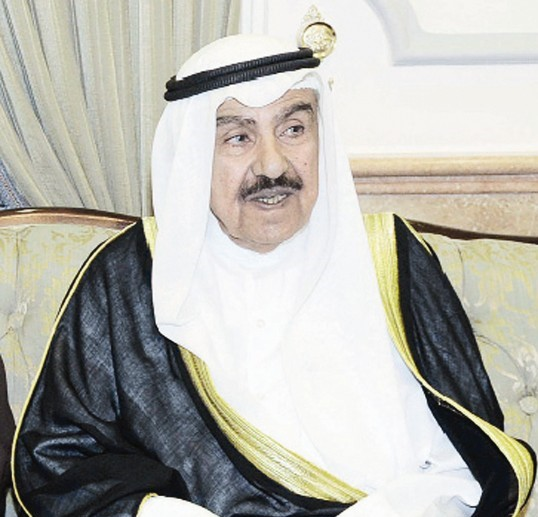
- Al-Ahmad in 2017

Minister of Post, Telegraph and Telephone
- In office 17 January 1962 – 23 January 1963

Minister of Guidance and Information
- In office 23 January 1963 – 29 December 1963

Personal details
- Born: 1930 Kuwait City, Kuwait
- Died: 25 September 2023 (aged 93)
- Parent: Abdullah Al-Ahmad Al-Sabah (father)

Mubarak Abdullah Al-Ahmad Al-Sabah (Arabic: مبارك عبد الله الأحمد الصباح; 1930 – 25 September 2023) was a Kuwaiti politician. He served as Minister of Post, Telegraph and Telephone from 1962 to 1963 and was Minister of Guidance and Information from January to December 1963.

== Death ==
Al-Ahmad died on 25 September 2023, at the age of 93.
