= House of Sabah =

Ruling dynasty of Kuwait

House of Sabah آل صباح

- Parent house: Ishmaelites; Qedarites tribe; Adnanites; Qays; Banu Sulaym; Anizah; Bani Utbah
- Country: Kuwait
- Founded: c. 1752
- Founder: Sabah I
- Current head: Mishal Al-Ahmad Al-Jaber Al-Sabah
- Titles: Emir; Crown Prince; Sheikh
- Connected families: House of Khalifa
- Traditions: Sunni

The House of Al Sabah (Arabic: آل صباح, romanized: Āl Ṣabāḥ) is the ruling family of Kuwait.

== History ==
=== Origin ===
The Al Sabah family originate from the Bani Utbah confederation. Prior to settling in Kuwait, the Al Sabah family were expelled from Umm Qasr in southern Iraq by the Ottomans due to their predatory habits of preying on caravans in Basra and trading ships in the Shatt al-Arab. According to one oral tradition, the Al Sabah family settled across various regions in southern Iran and Iraq, until they finally settled in what is now Kuwait around the mid-1700s. According to another oral tradition, told to the Political Agent by Shaikh Abdulla, the Sabahs fled drought in central Arabia in the early 1700s. They migrated south, but finding conditions bleaker still, returned and now with other families migrated to Zubara, on Qatar's west coast. Conditions there were no better so they migrated again, this time north to Kuwait where, finding water, they settled. On the last leg of the journey they had atabu-ila al-shimal (moved to the north). And that, according to one tradition, was the origin of the name Bani Utub. Soon after founding a settlement in Kuwait, a Sabah became leader, ruling until his death in 1762.

=== Mubarak the Great ===
The reign of Mubarak the Great (1896–1915) forged the critical alliance between Kuwait and Britain. In the late 19th century, resurgent Ottoman power coupled with rising Al-Saud power drew Kuwait closer to the Ottomans. This began to change as the century closed. When Sheikh Mohammed came to power in 1892, disagreements soon arose between him and his brother Mubarak. Muhammad dealt with this by busying Mubarak with affairs outside the capital. In 1896, Mubarak summoned his sons, Jabir and Salim, along with some supporters and rode to Kuwait, secretly entering Muhammed's house. There he killed Muhammed and his brother Jarrah. In the morning, Mubarak announced that his brothers had died, and that he ruled in their stead.

=== Sheikh Abdullah Al-Salim ===
Sheikh Abdullah Al-Salim Al-Sabah ended the British protectorate status of Kuwait by signing a treaty with the British on 19 June 1961. He introduced the Constitution of Kuwait in 1962, followed by the Parliament in 1963.

=== Gulf War ===
During the Gulf War, the Emir of Kuwait Sheikh Jaber Al-Ahmad Al-Sabah and his government ran the exiled government from a hotel in Ta'if, Saudi Arabia.

From Ta'if, Sheikh Jaber set up his government so that its ministers were in communication with the people still in Kuwait. The government was able to direct an underground armed resistance made up of both military and civilian forces and was able to provide public services to the Kuwaiti people who remained, such as emergency care through the funds that it had saved from oil revenues. In the meantime, Sheikh Jaber and his government lobbied to receive military support action against Iraq before and during the Gulf War. When the war ended on 28 February 1991, Sheikh Jaber remained in Saudi Arabia while declaring three months of martial law.

By imposing martial law, government officials were able to ensure that there were no Iraqis still in Kuwait who may have attempted to once again overthrow the government. They were also tasked with making sure that the country was safe enough for Sheikh Jaber and his government to return, which they eventually did on 15 March 1991.

== Public feuds ==
Kuwaiti political scientist Mohammed Alwuhaib has argued that "members of the Al Sabah [have] interfered in and manipulated political and economic factions as a tool to weaken each other, with allegations of corruption a particularly common tactic."

In August 2011, supporters of Sheikh Ahmed Al-Fahad Al-Ahmed Al-Sabah "discovered" documents that incriminated up to one-third of Kuwaiti politicians in what quickly became the largest political corruption scandal in Kuwaiti history. By October 2011, 16 Kuwaiti politicians were alleged to have received payments of $350m in return for their support of government policy.

In December 2013, allies of Sheikh Ahmad Al-Fahad claimed to possess tapes purportedly showing that Sheikh Nasser Al-Mohammed Al-Sabah and Jassem Al-Kharafi were discussing plans to topple the Kuwaiti government. Sheikh Ahmad Al-Fahad appeared on local channel Al-Watan TV describing his claims.

In April 2014 the Kuwaiti government imposed a total media blackout to ban any reporting or discussion on the issue. In March 2015, Kuwait's public prosecutor dropped all investigations into the alleged coup plot and Sheikh Ahmad Al-Fahad read a public apology on Kuwait state television renouncing the coup allegations. Since then, "numerous associates of his have been targeted and detained by the Kuwaiti authorities on various charges," most notably members of the so-called "Fintas Group" that had allegedly been the original circulators of the fake coup video.

In December 2015, Sheikh Ahmad Al-Fahad was convicted of "disrespect to the public prosecutor and attributing a remark to the country's ruler without a special permission from the emir's court," issuing a suspended six-month prison sentence and a fine of 1,000 Kuwaiti Dinar. In January 2016, the Kuwaiti appeals court overturned the prior ruling and cleared Sheikh Ahmad Al-Fahad of all charges.

In November 2018, Sheikh Ahmad Al-Fahad, along with four other defendants, were charged in Switzerland with forgery related to the fake coup video. Shortly thereafter, Sheikh Ahmad Al-Fahad temporarily stepped aside from his role at the International Olympic Committee, pending an ethics committee hearing into the allegations. In August 2021, Sheikh Ahmed attended court alongside three of the other four defendants. In September 2021, Sheikh Ahmed was convicted of forgery along with the four other defendants. He denied wrongdoing and plans to appeal.

In November 2019, former deputy prime minister and minister of interior Sheikh Khaled Al Jarrah Al Sabah was dismissed from office after minister of defense Sheikh Nasser Sabah Al Ahmed Al Sabah filed a complaint with the Kuwaiti Attorney General alleging embezzlement of 240 million Kuwaiti dinars ($794.5 million) of Kuwait government funds had taken place during Khaled's tenure as minister of defense. In July 2020, the US Department of Justice filed an asset forfeiture claim against The Mountain Beverly Hills and other real property in the United States, alleging a group of three Kuwaiti officials, including Sheikh Khaled Al Jarrah, set up unauthorized accounts in the name of the country's Military Attache Office in London, known as the 'Army Fund.' They allegedly funded the accounts with over $100m of Kuwaiti public money and used it for their own purposes. In March 2021, the Kuwaiti ministerial court ordered the detention of Khaled Al Jarrah, who was arrested and imprisoned.

On 13 April 2021, a Kuwaiti court ordered the detention of former prime minister Sheikh Jaber Al-Mubarak Al-Hamad Al-Sabah on corruption charges related to the 'Army Fund.' He is the first former Kuwaiti prime minister to face pre-trial detention over graft charges. The crimes allegedly took place during Jaber Al-Sabah's 2001–11 term as defense minister.

== Rulers ==
- 1st Ruler: Sheikh Sabah I bin Jaber: 1752–1762
- 2nd Ruler: Sheikh Abdullah I: 1762–1814
- 3rd Ruler: Sheikh Jaber I: 1814–1859
- 4th Ruler: Sheikh Sabah II: 1859–1866
- 5th Ruler: Sheikh Abdallah II: 1866–1892
- 6th Ruler: Sheikh Muhammad Al-Sabah: 1892–1896
- 7th Ruler: Sheikh Mubarak Al-Sabah: 1896–1915
- 8th Ruler: Sheikh Jaber II: 1915–1917
- 9th Ruler: Sheikh Salim Al-Mubarak Al-Sabah: 1917–1921
- 10th Ruler: Sheikh Ahmad Al-Jaber Al-Sabah: 1921–1950
- 11th Ruler 1st Emir Sheikh Abdullah Al-Salim Al-Sabah: 1950–1965
- 12th Ruler 2nd Emir Sheikh Sabah Al-Salim Al-Sabah: 1965–1977
- 13th Ruler 3rd Emir Sheikh Jaber Al-Ahmad Al-Sabah: 1977–2006
- 14th Ruler 4th Emir Sheikh Saad Al-Abdullah Al-Salim Al-Sabah: 15–29 January 2006
- 15th Ruler 5th Emir Sheikh Sabah Al-Ahmad Al-Jaber Al-Sabah: 2006–2020
- 16th Ruler 6th Emir Sheikh Nawaf Al-Ahmad Al-Jaber Al-Sabah: 2020–2023
- 17th Ruler 7th Emir Sheikh Mishal Al-Ahmad Al-Jaber Al-Sabah: 2023–present

== Dean of the House ==
- Chieftain, Sheikh Salem Al-Ali Al-Sabah (1926–2024)

== Governing branches ==
Chieftain Sheikhs of the House of Sabah have been leading the Military of Kuwait since the early establishment of defense infantry and cavalry forces. Since the forming of the first cabinet on 17 January 1962, all three of the defense ministry, interior ministry and ministry of foreign affairs of Kuwait have been led by members of the House of Sabah.

== Lineage ==
Sabah I, 1st Ruler Sheikh (1716–1762)
Abdullah I, 2nd Ruler Sheikh (1762–1814)
Jaber I, 3rd Ruler Sheikh (1814–1859)
Sabah II, 4th Ruler Sheikh (1859–1866)
Abdullah II, 5th Ruler Sheikh (1866–1892)	Mohammed, 6th Ruler Sheikh (1892–1896)	Mubarak, "The Great"; 7th Ruler Sheikh (1896–1915)
Jaber II, 8th Ruler Sheikh (1915–1917)	Salem, 9th Ruler Sheikh (1917–1921)	Abdullah, General Commander of Kuwait Army	Hamad	Nasser
Ahmad, 10th Ruler Sheikh (1921–1950)	Abdullah III, 11th Ruler, 1st Emir (1950–1965); 1st Prime Minister	Sabah III, 12th Ruler, 2nd Emir (1965–1977); 1st Foreign Minister; 2nd Prime Minister	Ali	Mohammad, Minister of Information; Minister of State for Amiri Diwan Affairs	Mubarak	Khalid
Abdullah, Former Head of Public Security	Mohammed Ahmad Jaber II, 1st Defense Minister	Jaber III, 13th Ruler, 3rd Emir, (1977–2006); 3rd Prime Minister	Sabah IV, 15th Ruler, 5th Emir, (2006–2020); 2nd Foreign Minister; 2nd Interior Minister; 5th Prime Minister	Nawaf I, 16th Ruler, 6th Emir, (2020–2023); 3rd and 8th Interior Minister; 4th Defense Minister; 1st National Guard Deputy	Mishal I, 17th Ruler, 7th Emir, (2023–present); 2nd National Guard Deputy	Saad, 14th Ruler, 4th Emir, 2006; 1st Interior Minister; 2nd Defense Minister; 4th Prime Minister	Salem, 4th Interior Minister; 3rd and 7th Defense Minister	Ali, 5th Defense Minister	Mohammad Al-Sabah, 3rd Foreign Minister; 10th Prime Minister	Jaber Al-Ali, Minister of Information	Salem, 1st National Guard Commander	Jaber, 8th Defense Minister; 9th Interior Minister; 7th Prime Minister	Sabah, Crown Prince, 4th Foreign Minister; 8th Prime Minister	Mohammad, 7th and 12th Interior Minister; 12th Defense Minister	Ahmad, 10th Defense Minister
Ahmad, 11th Prime Minister	Nasser, 6th Prime Minister	Nasser, 13th Defense Minister	Ahmad, 3rd National Guard Deputy; 18th Interior Minister; 9th Prime Minister	Thamer, 15th Interior Minister	Hamad, 15th Defense Minister
Ahmad, 5th Foreign Minister

== See also ==
- Government of Kuwait
- Politics of Kuwait
