= Abdullah Al-Ahmad Al-Jaber Al-Sabah =

Kuwaiti royal (1905–1957)

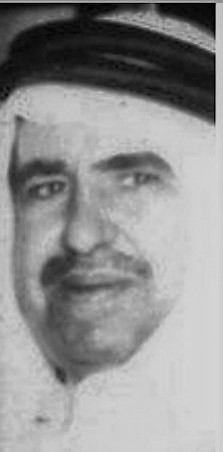
- Issue: Mubarak; Ahmad
- House: House of Sabah
- Father: Ahmad I

Sheikh Abdullah Al-Ahmad Al-Jaber Al-Sabah (Arabic: الشيخ عبدالله الأحمد الجابر الصباح; 1905 – January 28, 1957), was the head of the Public Security Department in Kuwait during the 1950s. He was the eldest son of the tenth ruler of the Sheikhdom of Kuwait, Sheikh Ahmad Al-Jaber Al-Sabah, from his wife Hussa Ibrahim Al-Ghanem. Born in Kuwait City, he served as the head of the Public Security Department in Kuwait.

== Life ==
He received his education from several traditional schools, memorizing the Quran and learning arithmetic. In 1938, he was appointed as the ordnance officer at Naif Palace and became associated with public security until he was later appointed as the deputy head of public security, under Sheikh Abdullah Al-Mubarak Al-Sabah.

He participated in most of Kuwait's famous battles, particularly the Battle of Al-Regeai in 1928.
