= Sabah I bin Jaber =

1st Ruler of Kuwait

1st Ruler of Kuwait
- Reign: 1752–1762
- Predecessor: Position established
- Successor: Abdullah I Al-Sabah

Governor of Kuwait
- Reign: 1718–1752
- Born: c. 1700; Al Aflaj - Riyadh - Najd
- Died: 1762 (aged 61–62); Kuwait
- Spouse: A sister of Shaikhah bin Khalifa bin Muhammad bin Faisal al-Enezi
- Issue: Salman; Muhammad; Jarrah; Mubarak; Malik; Sultan; Abd Allah I Fatima
- House: Sabah (founder)

Sheikh Abu Salman Sabah I bin Jaber Al Sabah (Arabic: أبو سلمان صباح بن جابر الصباح الأول) (c. 1700–1762) was the first ruler of the Sheikhdom of Kuwait. He was chosen by his community for the position of sheikh.

== Reign of Sabah bin Jaber ==
The families of the Bani Utbah arrived in Kuwait in the mid 1700s and settled after receiving permission from the Emir of al-Hasa Sa'dun bin Muhammad who ruled from 1691 to 1722. In 1718, the head of each family in the town of Kuwait gathered and chose Sabah I bin Jaber as the Sheikh of Kuwait, becoming a governor of sorts underneath the Emir of Al Hasa.

In 1752, Kuwait became independent after an agreement between the Sheikh of Kuwait and the Emir of Al Hasa in which Al Hasa recognised Sabah I bin Jaber's independent rule over Kuwait and in exchange Kuwait would not ally itself or support the enemies of Al Hasa or interfere in the internal affairs of Al Hasa in any way. Upon his death, Sabah I was succeeded by his youngest son, Abdullah bin Sabah.

== See also ==
- List of emirs of Kuwait
- Flag of Kuwait

Sabah I bin Jaber House of Sabah Born: c. 1700 Died: 1762
Regnal titles
New title Independence of Kuwait, himself as governor from 1718	Sheikh of Kuwait; 1752–1762	Succeeded by Abdullah I Al-Sabah
