= Sabah II Al-Sabah =

Ruler of Kuwait from 1859 to 1866

Sabah II bin Jaber Al-Sabah

4th Ruler of Kuwait
- Reign: 1859 – November 1866
- Predecessor: Jabir I
- Successor: Abd Allah II
- Born: c. 1784; Sheikhdom of Kuwait
- Died: November 1866 (aged 81-82); Sheikhdom of Kuwait
- Issue: Jarrah; Abd Allah II; Muhammad I Ahmad; Jarrah; Mubarak I Athbi; Ghumlar; Hamud; Jabir; Hababa; Haya; Mauza; Sabika
- House: Al-Sabah
- Father: Jabir I
- Mother: a daughter of Sheikh Sultan bin Sabah Al-Sabah

Sheikh Sabah II bin Jaber Al-Sabah (c. 1784 – November 1866) was the fourth ruler of the Sheikhdom of Kuwait, ruling from 1859 to November 1866. He was the eldest son of Jaber I Al-Sabah, whom he succeeded. Sabah II was in turn succeeded by his eldest son Abdullah II Al-Sabah.

Sabah II Al-Sabah House of Sabah Born: 1784 Died: November 1866
Regnal titles
Preceded by Jaber I Al-Sabah	Sheikh of Kuwait; 1859–1866	Succeeded by Abdullah II Al-Sabah
