= Ahmad Al-Jaber Al-Sabah =

Ruler of the Sheikhdom of Kuwait from 1921 to 1950

Ahmad Al-Jaber Al-Sabah أحمد الجابر الصباح
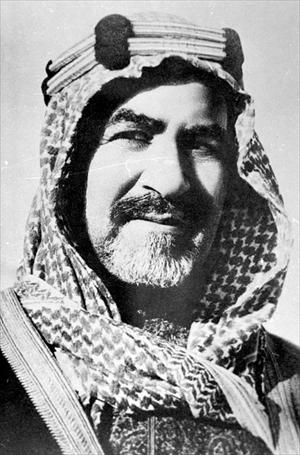

10th Ruler of Kuwait
- Reign: 29 March 1921 – 29 January 1950
- Predecessor: Salim I
- Successor: Abdullah III
- Born: 1885; Sheikhdom of Kuwait
- Died: 29 January 1950 (aged 64–65); Kuwait City, Sheikhdom of Kuwait
- Spouse: Bazba bint Salim al-Sabah (Bibi Mariam); Hussa bint Ibrahim al-Ghanim; Şükriye Sultan; Nura al-Tahus; Munira al-Ayyar; Delal al-Mutalaqqim; Mariam bint Murait al-Huwailah
- Issue: Abdullah; Muhammad; Jaber III; Sabah IV; Khalid; Nawaf I Mishal I Mansur; Faisal; Fahad; Munira; Hussa; Asena; Asma; Nuria; Muniyat; Badria; Nashmia; Al-Jazi; Al-Anud; Moza; Samiha; Fariha; Mishail; Sahira; Naima; Amthal; Nazila
- House: Sabah
- Father: Jaber II

Damat Sheikh Ahmad Al-Jaber Al-Sabah KCSI KCIE (1885 – 29 January 1950) (Arabic: الشيخ أحمد الجابر الصباح) was the tenth ruler of the Sheikhdom of Kuwait from 29 March 1921 until his death on 29 January 1950.

== Biography ==
Ahmad was the son of Jaber II Al-Sabah, who was the eighth ruler of the Sheikhdom of Kuwait between 1915 and 1917. He succeeded his uncle Salem Al-Sabah, the ninth ruler of the Sheikhdom of Kuwait, in February 1921.

Ahmad was the lead cavalry commander, founder of the military of Kuwait and the Directorate of Public Security Force. Ahmad tasked his defense cavalry and infantry to Sheikh Ali Salem Al-Mubarak Al-Sabah in the early 1920s and transferred the command of defense cavalry and infantry to Sheikh Abdullah Jaber Al-Abdullah II Al-Sabah following the 1928 Battle of Al-Regeai.

In 1936, the Palestinian authorities asked for financial aid from Ahmad Al Jaber, but he refused the demand due to treaty relations that did not permit any dealings with countries apart from Britain. Due to this prevailing condition, Kuwaiti royals and other leading figures were barred from financially assisting the Palestinians. Regardless of these orders, many defied them and in July 1936 200 Iraqi dinars were collected to be sent to Palestine. Later that year in October 1936, leading merchant families in Kuwait formed a seven-man committee to aide the Palestinians and called for a public meeting. The intent was to raise awareness for the ongoing revolution in Palestine and to gather funds for support. Al-Sabah was unable to stop this and discreetly left town on a hunting trip.

During his last period of his reign he was the minister of finance from 1940 to 1950.

== Personal life ==
Ahmad was married many times. Notable children include:

- Abdullah Al-Ahmad Al-Jaber Al-Sabah (1905–1957); head of the Public Security Department.
- Mohammed Al-Ahmad Al-Jaber Al-Sabah (1909–1975); 1st Defense Minister (1962–1964) to take charge of the Defense portfolio.
- Jaber Al-Ahmad Al-Jaber Al-Sabah (1926–2006); 13th Ruler and 3rd Emir of Kuwait (1977–2006).
- Sabah Al-Ahmad Al-Jaber Al-Sabah (1929–2020); 15th Ruler and 5th Emir of Kuwait (2006–2020).
- Nawaf Al-Ahmad Al-Jaber Al-Sabah (1937–2023); 16th Ruler and 6th Emir of Kuwait (2020–2023)
- Mishal Al-Ahmad Al-Jaber Al-Sabah (born 1940), current Emir of Kuwait (2023–present); formerly acting Minister (by protocol designation) and Deputy Commander of Kuwait National Guard.
- Fariha Al-Ahmad Al-Jaber Al-Sabah (1944–2018); philanthropist.
- Fahad Al-Ahmed Al-Jaber Al-Sabah (1945–1990); commando officer in the Kuwait Armed Forces, killed battling in defense of Dasman Palace.

== Death ==
Ahmad died in 1950 at Dasman Palace in Kuwait.

== Honors and awards ==
- Honorary Knight Commander of the Order of the Star of India
- Honorary Knight Commander of the Order of the Indian Empire

== See also ==
- Ahmad al-Jaber Air Base

Ahmad Al-Jaber Al-Sabah House of Sabah Born: 1885 Died: 29 January 1950
Regnal titles
| Preceded by Salim Al-Mubarak Al-Sabah | Sheikh of Kuwait; 1921–1950 | Succeeded by Abdullah III Al-Salim Al-Sabah |
