= Kuwaiti–Rashidi war =

War in Arabia, 1900–1901

Date	December 1900 – April 1901
Location	Jabal Shammar, Kuwait
Result	Victory Emirate of Jabal Shammar: Kuwaiti invasion of Nejd and Jabal shammer fails; Emirate of Jabal Shammar withdrew from Al-Jahra 3 weeks after its capture.

Belligerents
Sheikhdom of Kuwait; Al-Muntafiq; Emirate of Mohammerah; Sultanate of Nejd; Allied Arab tribes (17 Arab tribes)	Emirate of Jabal Shammar

Commanders and leaders
Mubarak I (WIA); Hamoud Al-Sabah †; Abdulaziz Al Saud	Abd al-Aziz II; Abdul Rahman bin Dhaban; Aljan ibn Muhammad

Units involved
Battle of Sarif: 64,000; Battle of Rakhima: 3,000; Siege of Masmak Fort: 3,000; Siege of Al-Jahra: 5,500	Battle of Sarif: 12,000; Battle of Rakhima: 1,200; Siege of Masmak Fort: 1,300–2,500; Siege of Al-Jahra: 3,500

Strength
Battle of Sarif: 64,000 (disputed)	Battle of Sarif: 12,000 (disputed)

Casualties and losses
Battle of Sarif: 9,000 (3,000 Kuwaiti 6,000 Allies) 400-850 captives Siege of Al-Jahra: 232 killed, dozens wounded, 200 captives Siege of Masmak Fort: 183 killed dozens wounded Battle of Rakhima: Unknown	Battle of Sarif: 400 killed Siege of Al-Jahra: Unknown; Siege of Masmak Fort: 158 killed dozens wounded Battle of Rakhima: Unknown

The Kuwaiti–Rashidi war was a conflict between the Sheikhdom of Kuwait and the Emirate of Jabal Shammar which was fought from 1900 to 1901. It began in mid-December 1900, when the emir of Kuwait, Mubarak Al-Sabah launched a raid into central Arabia. It saw moderate initial success, with the Kuwaitis moving into Najd towards the end of February 1901, and having captured Unaizah, Buraidah and Al-Zulfi by 11 March. Most of Riyadh was also captured (except for the besieged citadel), from where the Kuwaitis attempted to march on Ha'il, and on 11 March the Kuwaitis began a pursuit of the emir of Jabal Shammar, who was thought to be in the vicinity of Ha'il. However, Kuwaiti success saw a reversal on 17 March 1901 when the Kuwaiti army was defeated in the Battle of Sarif. Upon hearing of this defeat, Ibn Saud, who was besieging the Masmak fort in Riyadh (which was defended by Aljan ibn Muhammad), hastily retreated to Kuwait, and the emir of Kuwait followed suit, arriving in Kuwait on 31 March. The emir of Jabal Shammar, Abd al-Aziz ibn Mutib, attempted to follow up this victory by besieging Al Jahra, but retreated out of Kuwait after failing to capture Al Jahra for 2-3 weeks.

== Battles ==
=== Battle of Sarif ===
The Battle of Sarif was a conflict between the Sheikhdom of Kuwait and the Emirate of Jabal Shammar which was fought from 1900 to 1901. It began in mid-December 1900, when the emir of Kuwait, Mubarak Al-Sabah launched a raid into central Arabia. It saw moderate initial success, with the Kuwaitis moving into Najd towards the end of February 1901, and having captured Unaizah, Buraidah and Al-Zulfi by 11 March. Most of Riyadh was also captured (except for the besieged citadel), from where the Kuwaitis attempted to march on Ha'il, and on 11 March the Kuwaitis began a pursuit of the emir of Jabal Shammar, who was thought to be in the vicinity of Ha'il. However, Kuwaiti success saw a reversal on 17 March 1901 when the Kuwaiti army was defeated in the Battle of Sarif. Upon hearing of this defeat, Ibn Saud, who was besieging the Masmak fort in Riyadh (which was defended by Aljan ibn Muhammad), hastily retreated to Kuwait, and the emir of Kuwait followed suit, arriving in Kuwait on 31 March.

=== Battle of Rakhima ===
The Battle of Al-Rakhima was a raid launched by Kuwaiti forces on the Shammar tribes affiliated with the ruler of Hail in 1901 in the Al-Rakhima region in northwestern Kuwait after his withdrawal from Al-Jahra and some villages adjacent to Al-Jahra.

=== Siege of Masmak Fort ===
Abdulaziz Al Saud besieged Ibn Rashid's garrison in Al-Masmak Palace for 40 days, during which there were periods of fighting between the two parties. Abdulaziz Al Saud began implementing a plan to dig a tunnel leading to Al-Masmak Palace After 183 were killed and dozens were injured, but he stopped after he received news of the negative news of the adverse developments that occurred in the Battle of Al-Sarif, and the defeat of Sheikh Mubarak's army, which forced him to lift the siege of Al-Masmak Palace and leave Riyadh.

=== Siege of Al-Jahra ===
The siege of Al-Jahra on March 31. Ibn Rashid succeeded in occupying and besieging Jahra, and Kurdi Ibn Tawala Al Shamri attacked the wells of Kuwait and occupied a border area. Ibn Tawala succeeded with 200 camels in occupying and besieging some Kuwaiti areas, and Jaber Al Sabah's forces surrendered near Al Rakhima, and 200 Kuwaitis and he killed 232 were captured and some Kuwaiti forces fled, but after the victory, the Rashid forces withdrew from Jahra after 3 weeks of control British forces intervene .
