= Abdullah I Al-Sabah =

Abdullah Al-Sabah

2nd Ruler of Kuwait
- Reign: 1762 – 3 May 1814
- Predecessor: Sabah I
- Successor: Jabir I
- Born: 1740; Sheikhdom of Kuwait
- Died: 3 May 1814 (aged 73–74)
- Issue: Jabir I Duaij; Muhhamad; Mariam
- House: Al-Sabah
- Father: Sabah I
- Mother: a sister of Sheikh Khalifa bin Muhammad bin Faisal al-Utabi

Abdullah I bin Sabah Al-Sabah (1740 – 3 May 1814) was the second ruler of the Sheikhdom of Kuwait, ruling from 1762 to 1814. He was the youngest son of Sabah bin Jaber, upon whose death he succeeded. He was also the father of Jaber I Al-Sabah who succeeded him.

Abdullah I Al-Sabah House of Sabah Born: 1740 Died: 5 May 1814
Regnal titles
Preceded by Sabah I bin Jaber	Sheikh of Kuwait; 1762–1814	Succeeded by Jaber I Al-Sabah
