= Abdullah II Al-Sabah =

Ruler of Kuwait from 1866 to 1892

Abdullah II Sabah II Al-Jaber I Al-Sabah

5th Ruler of Kuwait
- Reign: November 1866 – 1892
- Predecessor: Sabah II
- Successor: Muhammad I
- Born: c. 1814; Sheikhdom of Kuwait
- Died: 29 May 1892 (aged 77–78)
- Issue: Khalifa; Jabir; Shekha; Haya; Fatima
- House: Al-Sabah
- Father: Sabah II
- Mother: Fatma bint Salim Al-Jarrah

Sheikh Abdullah II Sabah II Al-Jabir I Al-Sabah (c. 1814 – 1892) (Arabic: الشيخ عبد الله الثاني صباح الثاني الجابر الصباح) was a cavalry commander in the Military of Kuwait and was the fifth ruler of the Sheikhdom of Kuwait from 1866 to 1892. The eldest son of the fourth ruler of Kuwait, Sabah II, his reign was marked by efforts to manage natural disasters, maintain stability, and fortify ties with the Ottoman Empire, a key supplier of drinking water for Kuwait. Notably, the first coins were minted in Kuwait during his tenure.

== Early life ==
On his father's orders, Abdullah II signed, on 24 April 1841, a one-year naval truce with Samuel Hennell, who spoke on behalf of the British. The truce, which was never renewed upon expiry, prohibited Kuwait from undertaking any form of maritime offense as well as handing over all mediation efforts in maritime disputes to the British Empire.

== Reign ==
Assuming power from November 1866 to 1892, Abdullah inherited a Sheikhdom experiencing a century of growth in merchant and naval activity, largely stabilized through British support. As ruler, he shifted alliances towards the Ottoman Empire, distancing from British influence while negotiating with the Al Saud family for power retention. Throughout his reign he rebuffed requests from the British Commissioner, Lewis Pelly, speaking on behalf of the British Empire, to oppose the Ottomans. Known for his modesty and simplicity, Abdullah’s leadership marked a strategic transition in regional allegiances.

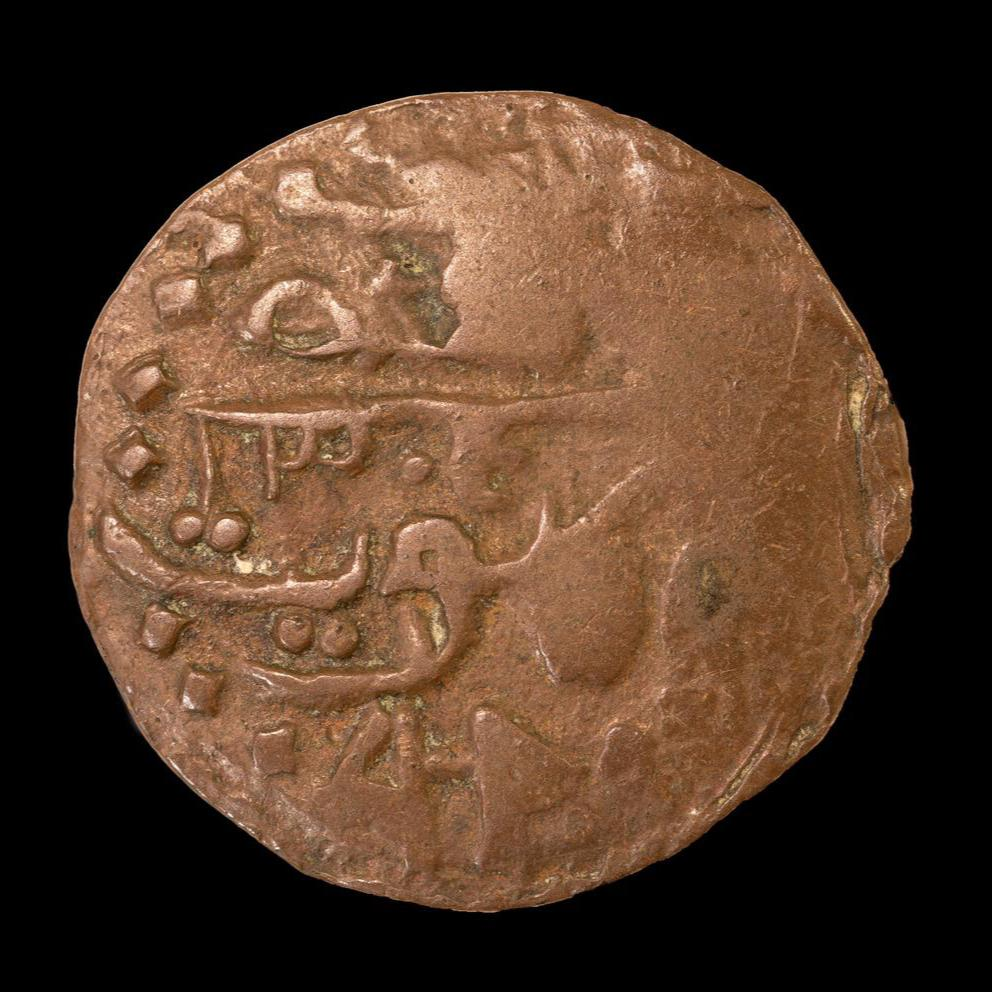
Kuwaiti Baisa in 1886

A great deal of this approval hinged on his relief work during natural disasters. In 1868 a great famine struck and he worked to bring an end to the rampant starvation. In September 1871 disaster struck again, this time in the maritime industry of Kuwait. Hundreds of Kuwaiti pearling vessels were sunk along with their crews due to extremely high waves. Historians are split on whether this was due to great storms in the Indian Ocean or caused by the eruption of Bushehr.

In 1886–87, under Abdullah II, Kuwait began minting coins in copper due to the lack of Indian rupees circulating in the local economy.

Abdullah sided with the Jabir bin Mardaw, Emir of Khorramshar during the Basra and Muhamarrah conflict with the Al-Nasser tribe under his reign, and helped him consolidate power in the region.

In 1871, in recognition of his significant contributions to the Al-Ahsa expedition, or the Ottoman conquest of Al-Ahsa, Midhat Pasha bestowed him with the honorific title of Kaymakam, signifying a provincial sub-governor.

== Physical description ==
In his later years he was described as tall with a heavy athletic body and a long white beard. He wore a purple bisht made of silk and adorned with gold embroidery over a thawb, with a white silk scarf used as a belt. On both hands rested many diamond rings. At his waist was an ornate janbiya with a hilt made of solid gold, encrusted with pearls and gemstones.

== Notes ==
Abdullah II Al-Sabah House of Sabah Died: May 1892
Regnal titles
Preceded by Sabah II Al-Sabah	Sheikh of Kuwait; 1866–1892	Succeeded by Muhammad bin Sabah Al-Sabah
