= Emir of Kuwait =

Head of state

- أمير الكويت
- Arms of His Highness the Emir of Kuwait

Incumbent
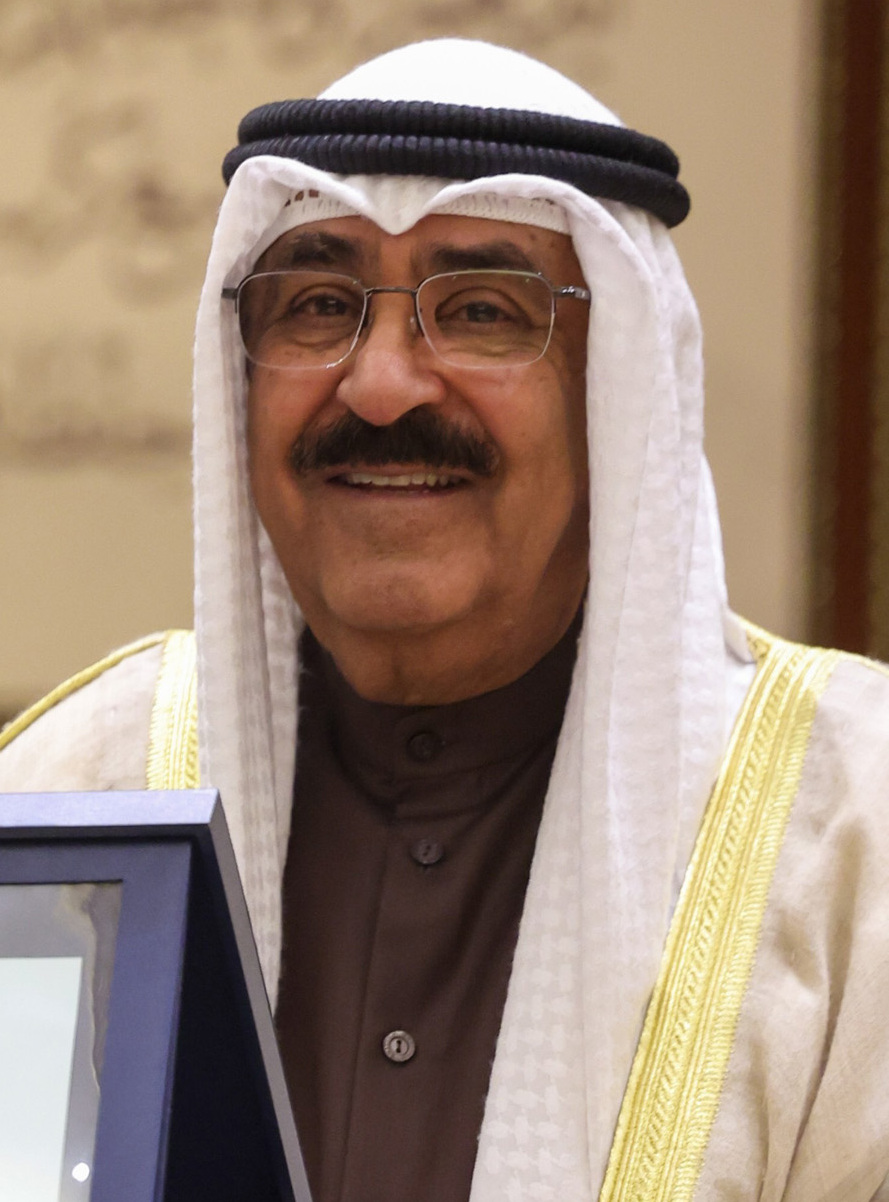
- Mishal Al-Ahmad Al-Jaber Al-Sabah since 16 December 2023

Details
- Style: His Highness
- First monarch: Sheikh Sabah I bin Jaber
- Formed: 1752; 274 years ago
- Residence: Bayan Palace

Standard of the Emir

The Emir of the State of Kuwait (Arabic: أمير دولة الكويت) is the monarch and head of state of Kuwait, and is the country's most powerful office. The emirs of Kuwait are members of the Al Sabah dynasty.

Sheikh Mishal Al-Ahmad Al-Jaber Al-Sabah became the emir of Kuwait on 16 December 2023, following the death of Nawaf Al-Ahmad Al-Jaber Al-Sabah.

== Rules and traditions of succession ==
Succession to the throne of Kuwait is limited to the descendants of Mubarak Al-Sabah. The position of emir also, traditionally, has alternating between the two main branches of the Al Sabah family, the Al-Ahmed and Al-Salem branches. The reigning emir must appoint an heir apparent within one year of his accession to the throne; the nominee for consideration as crown prince has to be a senior member of the Al Sabah family. The prime minister is appointed by the emir.

=== Compensation ===
Annual compensation for the emir was defined. The annual compensation was set to 50 million KWD as of 2017.

== List of rulers ==
=== Emirs of Bani Khalid (1669–1796) ===
Name	Reign start	Reign end	Notes
Barrak ibn Ghurayr	1669	1682	
Muhammad bin Ghurair	1682	1691	
Sa'dun bin Muhammad	1691	1722	
Ali bin Muhammad	1722	1736	
Sulayman bin Muhammad Al Khalidi	1736	1752	
Urayar bin Dajeen bin Saadoun	1752	1774	
Bateen Bin Urayer	1774	1775	
Dajeen bin Urayer	1775	1775	
Sa'dun bin Urayar	1775	1786	
Duwaihis Bin Urayar	1786	1793	
Zaid bin Urayar	1793	1794	
Barak bin Abdul Mohsen	1793	1796	

== Emirs of Kuwait (since 1752) ==
Name	Lifespan	Reign start	Reign end	Notes	Family	Image
Sheikh; Sabah I bin Jaber: Sabah I; صباح بن جابر	c. 1700–1762 (aged 61–62)	1752	1762	According to the official Kuwaiti sources, Sabah I was unanimously chosen for the position of sheikh.	Al Sabah	
Sheikh; Abdullah I Al-Sabah: Abdullah I; عبدالله الأول الصباح	1740–1814 (aged 73–74)	1762	3 May 1814	Youngest son of Sabah I bin Jaber	Al Sabah	
Sheikh; Jaber I Al-Sabah: Jaber I; جابر الصباح	1775–1859 (aged 83–84)	3 May 1814	1859	Eldest son of Abdullah I Al-Sabah	Al Sabah	
Sheikh; Sabah II Al-Sabah: Sabah II; صباح الثاني الصباح	1784–1866 (aged 81–82)	1859	November 1866	Eldest son of Jaber I Al-Sabah	Al Sabah	
Sheikh; Abdullah II Al-Sabah: Abdullah II; عبدالله الثاني الصباح	1814–1892 (aged 77–78)	November 1866	1892	Eldest son of Sabah II Al-Sabah	Al Sabah	
Sheikh; Muhammad bin Sabah Al-Sabah: Muhammad I; محمد الصباح	1838–1896 (aged 57–58)	May 1892	1896	Second son of Sabah II Al-Sabah	Al Sabah	Muhammad Al-Sabah of Kuwait
Sheikh; Mubarak Al-Sabah: Mubarak I the Great; مبارك الصباح	1837 – 28 November 1915 (aged 77–78)	18 May 1896	28 November 1915	Son of Sabah II Al-Sabah	Al Sabah	Mubarak Al-Sabah of Kuwait
Sheikh; Jaber II Al-Sabah: Jaber II; جابر الثاني الصباح	1860 – 5 February 1917 (aged 56–57)	28 November 1915	5 February 1917	Eldest son of Mubarak Al-Sabah	Al Sabah	Jaber II Al-Sabah of Kuwait
Sheikh; Salim Al-Mubarak Al-Sabah: Salim I; سالم المبارك الصباح	1864 – 23 February 1921 (aged 56–57)	5 February 1917	23 February 1921	Second son of Mubarak Al-Sabah	Al Sabah	Salim Al-Mubarak Al-Sabah of Kuwait
Sheikh; Ahmad Al-Jaber Al-Sabah: Ahmad I; احمد الجابر الصباح	1885 – 29 January 1950 (aged 64–65)	29 March 1921	29 January 1950	Son of Jaber II Al-Sabah	Al Sabah	Ahmad Al-Jaber Al-Sabah of Kuwait
Sheikh; Abdullah Al-Salim Al-Sabah: Abdullah III; عبدالله السالم الصباح	1895 – 24 November 1965 (aged 69–70)	29 January 1950	24 November 1965	Eldest son of Salim Al-Mubarak Al-Sabah	Al Sabah	Abdullah Al-Salim Al-Sabah of Kuwait
Sheikh; Sabah Al-Salim Al-Sabah: Sabah III; صباح السالم الصباح	12 April 1913 – 31 December 1977 (aged 64)	24 November 1965	31 December 1977	Youngest son of Salim Al-Mubarak Al-Sabah	Al Sabah	Sabah Al-Salim Al-Sabah of Kuwait
Sheikh; Jaber Al-Ahmad Al-Sabah (Note: In exile in Taif, Saudi Arabia between 2 August 1990 and 15 March 1991, due to the Iraqi invasion and occupation, and the subsequent Gulf War.): Jaber III; جابر الأحمد الصباح	29 June 1926 – 15 January 2006 (aged 79)	31 December 1977	15 January 2006	Third son of Ahmad Al-Jaber Al-Sabah	Al Sabah	Jaber Al-Ahmad Al-Sabah of Kuwait
Sheikh; Saad Al-Salim Al-Sabah: Saad I; سعد السالم الصباح	13 May 1930 – 13 May 2008 (aged 78)	15 January 2006	24 January 2006 (Note: Deposed by the National Assembly and abdicated simultaneously due to illness.)	Eldest son of Abdullah Al-Salim Al-Sabah	Al Sabah	Saad Al-Salim Al-Sabah of Kuwait
Sheikh; Sabah Al-Ahmad Al-Jaber Al-Sabah: Sabah IV; صباح الأحمد الجابر الصباح	16 June 1929 – 29 September 2020 (aged 91)	29 January 2006	29 September 2020	Fourth son of Ahmad Al-Jaber Al-Sabah	Al Sabah	Sabah Al-Ahmad Al-Jaber Al-Sabah of Kuwait
Sheikh; Nawaf Al-Ahmad Al-Jaber Al-Sabah: Nawaf I; نواف الأحمد الجابر الصباح	25 June 1937 – 16 December 2023 (aged 86)	29 September 2020	16 December 2023	Sixth son of Ahmad Al-Jaber Al-Sabah	Al Sabah	Nawaf Al-Ahmad Al-Jaber Al-Sabah of Kuwait
Sheikh; Mishal Al-Ahmad Al-Jaber Al-Sabah: Mishal I; مشعل الأحمد الجابر الصباح	27 September 1940 (age 86)	16 December 2023	Incumbent	Seventh son of Ahmad Al-Jaber Al-Sabah	Al Sabah	Sheikh Mishal Al-Ahmad Al-Jaber Al-Sabah of Kuwait

== See also ==
- Politics of Kuwait
