= Jaber I Al-Sabah =

Jaber bin Abdullah Al-Sabah

3rd Ruler of Kuwait
- Reign: 3 May 1814 – 1859
- Predecessor: Abd Allah I
- Successor: Sabah II
- Born: 1775; Sheikhdom of Kuwait
- Died: 1859 (aged 83–84)
- Spouse: a daughter of Sheikh Sultan bin Sabah Al-Sabah
- Issue: Sabah II; Khalifa; Salman; Duaij; Mubarak; Ali; Muhammad; Hamud; Abd Allah; Malik; Miqrin; Bazah; Jarah; Shamlan
- House: Sabah
- Father: Abd Allah I

Sheikh Jaber bin Abdullah Al-Sabah (Arabic: جابر بن عبد الله; Jaber I or Jaber Al-Aish; 1775 – 1859) was the third ruler of the Sheikdom of Kuwait. He governed from 1814 to 1859. He was the eldest son of Abdullah bin Sabah, whom he succeeded upon his death.

== Reign ==
Jaber's foreign policy was more closely aligned with the Ottoman Empire and opposed to the British. He assisted the Ottomans in fighting against the Banu Ka'b for control of Basra and Khorramshahr, and rebuffed British attempts to make Kuwait a British protectorate. In 1822, he negotiated an agreement with Ibrahim Pasha that allowed Egyptian ships and caravans to pass through Kuwaiti territory. He sheltered political refugees during his reign, most notably Khalid bin Saud Al Saud from Najd, who fled from his cousin Abdullah bin Thunayan Al Saud.

In 1841, he signed a treaty with the British, on freedom of navigation and opposition to the slave trade.

== Legacy ==
He was succeeded by his eldest son Sabah II Al-Sabah.

Jaber I Al-Sabah's children were:

- Sheikh Sabah (the fourth ruler of Kuwait)
- Sheikh Khalifa
- Sheikha Bazza
- Sheikh Salman
- Sheikh Daij
- Sheikh Mujran
- Sheikh Mubarak
- Sheikh Ali
- Sheikh Mohammed
- Sheikh Hammoud
- Sheikh Jarrah
- Sheikh Shamlan
- Sheikh Abdullah

Jaber I Al-Sabah House of Sabah Born: 1775 Died: 1859
Regnal titles
Preceded by Abdullah I Al-Sabah	Sheikh of Kuwait; 3 May 1814–1859	Succeeded by Sabah II Al-Sabah
