= Abdullah Al-Salim Al-Sabah =

Ruler of Sheikhdom of Kuwait from 1950 to 1965

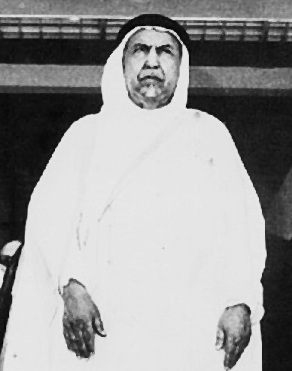
- Abdullah in 1962

1st Emir of the State of Kuwait
- Reign: 19 June 1961 – 24 November 1965
- Predecessor: Himself as ruler
- Successor: Sabah III Al-Salim Al-Sabah

11th Ruler of the Sheikhdom of Kuwait
- Reign: 29 January 1950 – 18 June 1961
- Coronation: 25 February 1950
- Predecessor: Ahmad Al-Jaber Al-Sabah
- Successor: Himself (as Emir)
- Born: 1895; Sheikhdom of Kuwait
- Died: 24 November 1965 (aged 69–70); Kuwait City, Kuwait
- Issue: Saad Al-Salim Al-Sabah
- House: Sabah
- Father: Salim Al-Mubarak Al-Sabah
- Mother: Sheikha Mariam bint Jarrah Al-Sabah

Sheikh Abdullah III Al-Salim Al-Sabah (Arabic: الشيخ عبد الله الثالث السالم الصباح; 1895 – 24 November 1965) was the eleventh ruler of the Sheikhdom of Kuwait from 1950 to 1961 and the first Emir of the State of Kuwait after the country gained its independence from Great Britain on 19 June 1961.

== Biography ==
Abdullah was the eldest son of Salim Al-Mubarak Al-Sabah. He was the minister of finance from 1939 to 1940. He took power after the death of his cousin Ahmad Al-Jaber Al-Sabah and also ruled as regent upon the death of his father until the election of Sheikh Ahmad. The anniversary of his coronation, 25 February, serves as Kuwait's national day.

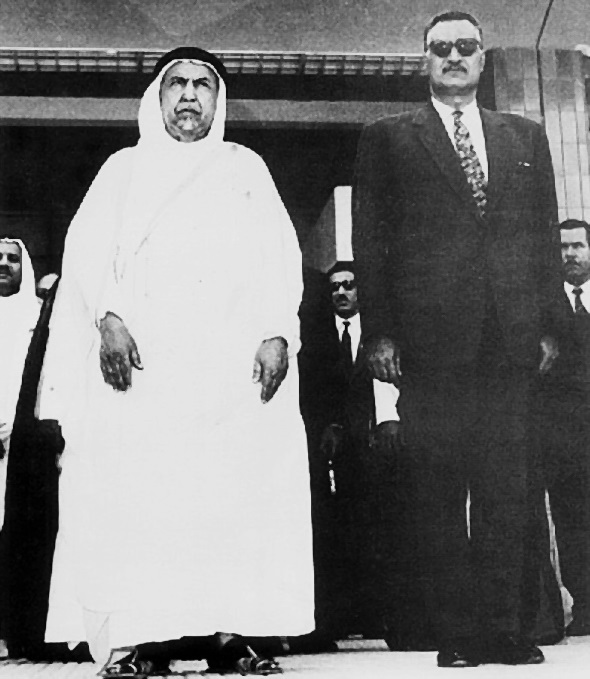
Abdullah with Egyptian president Gamal Abdel Nasser during a state visit to Cairo in 1962

Unlike his predecessors, Abdullah was more pro-Arab than pro-British. He effectively ended the British "protectorate" status of Kuwait by signing a treaty with the British on 19 June 1961. He is regarded as the founder of modern Kuwait. He introduced the Constitution of Kuwait in 1962, followed by the Parliament in 1963. He is regarded as having been more committed to constitutionalism and parliamentary democracy than successive rulers.

== Death ==
Abdullah Al-Salim died on 24 November 1965, after suffering from a heart attack during the opening of the fourth ordinary session of the National Assembly. The Kuwaiti government announced a 30-day national mourning with flags at half-mast along with a one-day official holiday in all ministries, departments and state institutions.

== Honours and awards ==
=== National ===
- Sovereign Grand Master of the Order of National Defence
- Sovereign Grand Master of the Military Duty Order

Abdullah Al-Salim Al-Sabah House of Sabah Born: 1895 Died: 24 November 1965
Regnal titles
| Preceded by Himself, as Sheikh of Kuwait and dependencies | Emir of Kuwait; 1961–1965 | Succeeded by Sabah III Al-Salim Al-Sabah |
| Preceded by Ahmad Al-Jaber Al-Sabah | Sheikh of Kuwait; 1950–1961 | Succeeded by Himself, as Emir of Kuwait |
