= Jaber II Al-Sabah =

8th Ruler of the Sheikhdom of Kuwait

Jaber Mubarak Al-Sabah II Al-Sabah
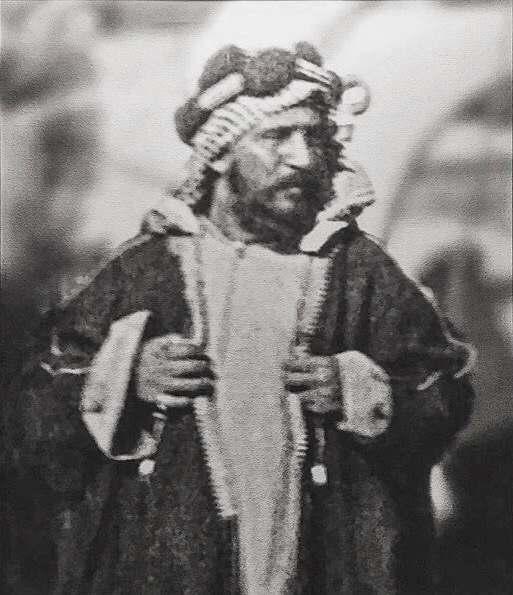
- Jaber Mubarak Al-Sabah II Al-Sabah

8th Ruler of Kuwait
- Reign: 28 November 1915 – 5 February 1917; Sheikhdom of Kuwait
- Predecessor: Mubarak I
- Successor: Salim I
- Born: 1860; Sheikhdom of Kuwait
- Died: 5 February 1917 (aged 56–57)
- Issue: Ahmad; Hamud; Mariam
- House: Al-Sabah
- Father: Mubarak I

Jaber II Al-Mubarak Al-Sabah, CSI (1860 – 5 February 1917), was the eighth ruler of the Sheikhdom of Kuwait from the Al-Sabah dynasty. He was the eldest son of Mubarak Al-Sabah and is the ancestor of the Al-Jaber branch of the Al-Sabah family. He ruled the country from 28 November 1915 to his death on 5 February 1917 and was succeeded by his brother, Salim Al-Mubarak Al-Sabah.

Although his reign was very short, Jaber is known for economic reforms he initiated.

== Honours and awards ==
- Companion of the Order of the Star of India (CSI): Conferred in the 1916 Birthday Honours. Awarded 23 November 1916

Jaber II Al-Sabah House of Sabah Born: 1860 Died: 5 February 1917
Regnal titles
Preceded by Mubarak Al-Sabah	Sheikh of Kuwait; 1915–1917	Succeeded by Salim Al-Mubarak Al-Sabah
