= Mubarak Al-Sabah =

Ruler of the Sheikhdom of Kuwait, 1896–1915

Mubarak Sabah Al-Jaber Al-Sabah مبارك بن صباح الصباح
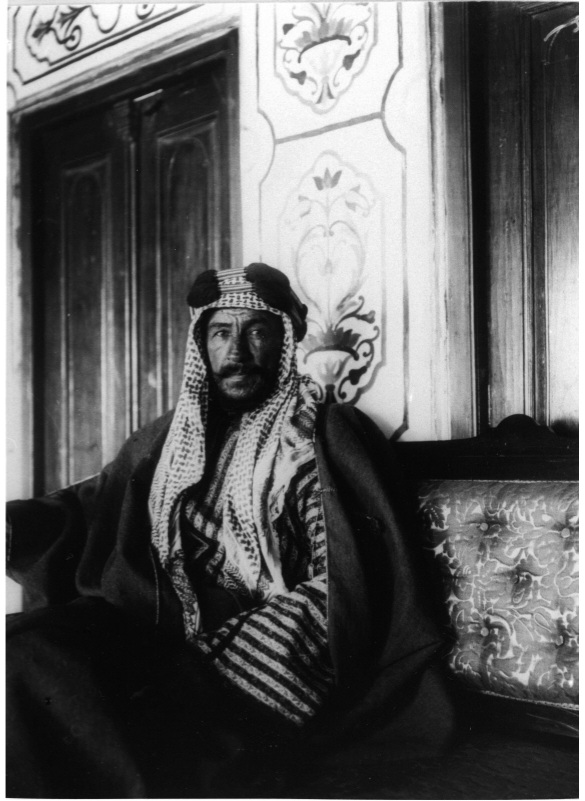
- Photograph by Hermann Burchardt, 1903

7th Ruler of Kuwait
- Reign: 18 May 1896 – 28 November 1915
- Predecessor: Muhammad I
- Successor: Jabir II
- Born: c. 1837; Sheikhdom of Kuwait
- Died: 28 November 1915 (aged 77–78)
- Issue: Jabir II; Salim I Sabah; Nasser; Fahad; Hamad; Saud; Abdullah; Sharifa; Hussa; Mudhi; Mariam; Habiba; Moza; Aisha; Bibi
- House: Sabah
- Father: Sabah II
- Mother: Lulwa bint Muhammad Al Thaqib

Mubarak Al-Sabah KCSI KCIE (c. 1837 – 28 November 1915; Arabic: الشيخ مبارك بن صباح الصباح), known as Mubarak the Great (Arabic: مبارك الكبير) and nicknamed "the lion of the peninsula" (Arabic: أسد الجزيرة), was the seventh ruler of the Sheikhdom of Kuwait, from 18 May 1896 until his death on 18 November 1915. Mubarak ascended the throne after assassinating his predecessor and half-brother, Muhammad Al-Sabah, and is known for his significant role in shaping modern Kuwait.

Mubarak was also the father of two rulers of Kuwait who succeeded him, Jaber and Salim, from which the Al-Jaber and Al-Salim in the Al-Sabah family branches originated respectively, and is the paternal ancestor of all successive rulers and prime ministers of Kuwait. The constitution of the State of Kuwait mandates that the Emir of Kuwait must be a descendant of Mubarak from the ruling Al-Sabah family.

Mubarak signed the Anglo-Kuwaiti Treaty with Great Britain on 23 November 1899, pledging himself and his successors not to receive foreign agents or representatives or to cede or sell territory without the approval of the British government; with this agreement, and the guarantee it represented to Kuwait and the Al-Sabah family, he is regarded as the founder of modern-day Kuwait.

== Early life ==
Mubarak was born into Kuwaiti's powerful al-Sabah family in 1837, son of Sheikh Sabah II Al-Sabah (r. 1859-1866). When he attained the necessary age to do so, Mubarak served primarily as the cavalry commander of the Military of Kuwait in many operations, including several Ottoman campaigns – most notably campaigns in 1871, 1892, and 1894 into Hasa, Qatar, and southern Iraq. For his long service Mubarak received the title istabl-i amire payesi, "(Rank of) The Grand Equerry of his Imperial Majesty", in August 1879 for a campaign into Qatif and southern Iraq. He was given four more Ottoman honors as reward for his services in the Qatar campaign, though the value of his contributions is disputed. Although Mubarak was known for his ties with the British after his ascension to sheikhdom in 1896, he did have interactions with the British as early as 1863 when he met Sir Lewis Pelly, British political resident of Persia who went on many diplomatic missions around the region, and in 1883 when he was sent on an Ottoman diplomatic mission to Bahrain.

== Assassination of Muhammad and Jarrah Al-Sabah ==
On 8 May 1896, Mubarak killed his half-brothers Muhammad and Jarrah, enabling himself to assume the Kuwaiti throne.

Most scholars believe that Mubarak assassinated his half-brothers, but the details of the assassination vary. Jill Crystal posits that Mubarak, with his sons Jabir and Salim, along with loyal supporters, assassinated his half-brothers in secret during the night. Frederick Anscombe also states that Mubarak "and his men" (without specifying whether his sons were in on the plot) killed his half-brothers in the early hours of the day. There are several possible theories as to why Mubarak may have assassinated his half-brothers. One theory is that Mubarak resented being constantly sent away on tribal expeditions out into the desert. A second related theory is that Muhammad did not adequately fund Mubarak's expeditions. The third theory is that Muhammad was a weak and "indolent" leader whose unpopularity in Kuwait "necessitated" his removal. The most plausible theory is that Mubarak felt he did not receive his rightful share of the family wealth and property, causing contention and a strong desire to seize it. However, B.J. Slot, who is not even convinced that Mubarak was the assassin, asserts that "the widely divergent stories and interpretations… make it impossible to reach a firm conclusion about what happened in Kuwait in 1896." Slot asserts that on a local level there was a lack of support for people who claimed that Mubarak assassinated his half-brothers, and that if he had indeed done it revenge would have been taken on him.

== Struggle for legitimacy ==
Mubarak acted to bribe the Ottoman bureaucracy through lavish gift-giving in order to gain support for his appointment as kaymakam [sub governor] of Kuwait like his previous brothers. This is further illustrated through a memorandum by Captain J.F. Whyte, a British agent stationed in Basra: "Sheikh Mubarak has, since his usurpation, been employing his late brother's wealth to secure his recognition as Sheikh and his appointment as Kaimakam of Koweit by the Sublime Porte." Mubarak constantly avowed his loyalty to Istanbul, but a bitter debate raged among the ruling Ottoman Council on what course of action to take with Mubarak and his apparent fratricide. The debates were fueled by a lack of information and confusing accounts surrounding Mubarak, partly because of Mubarak's own manipulation and spread of disinformation. Some Ottoman officers considered military action in Kuwait as a solution to the problem, especially Hamdi Pasha the Wali of Basra, who proposed an intervention from Basra into Kuwait.

The Ottomans were very hesitant to name Mubarak as kaymakam, but he was given the title in December 1897 in large part due to a controversy and conspiracy that involved Mubarak and Basra's government regarding Mubarak's rival, Yusuf al-Ibrahim. The controversy further destabilized relations in the region to dangerous levels. Because of the tension and instability of the situation the Ottoman Council decided that naming Mubarak kaymakam would be a better alternative to potentially bloody military action. Another reason was that military intervention may have further destabilized the region and destroyed any support that the Ottomans had with the Kuwaiti people. Finally, the Ottomans also had growing anxiety over possible encroachment by the Great Powers, most notably Britain and Russia into the region due to the construction of the Baghdad Railway.

== Relations with the British Empire ==
The long Ottoman indecisiveness in naming Mubarak kaymakam, as well as feelings of vulnerability helped pave the way for Mubarak to pursue British ties. On 18 January 1899, Mubarak signed a secret agreement with Major M.J. Meade, British political resident in Bushire, that guarded Kuwait against any outside foreign aggression. It also required Mubarak and his successors not to receive foreign agents or representatives or to cede or sell territory without the approval of the British government. Meade was eager to establish Kuwait as an official British protectorate with the intention of extending British influence further into the Arabian Gulf and protecting its own trade as well as controlling the potential terminus for a purposed railway from Port Said and the prevention of a possible Ottoman or Russian takeover of Kuwait. However, neither Mubarak nor other British officials wanted to make Kuwait a protectorate. As a private letter from Sir Arthur Godley, Permanent Under-Secretary of India, wrote to Lord Curzon: "we don't want Koweit, but we don't want anyone else to have it." Mubarak's British protection made him free to secure and strengthen his own power without fear of any outside interference from the Ottomans, surrounding tribes, or the Russians. When Lord Curzon visited Kuwait in November of 1903 described Mubarak as, “by far the most masculine and vigorous personality whom I have encountered in the Gulf.” -

== 1901 campaign ==
Mubarak, comforted by British protection felt free to pursue his own policies and mounted an invasion into Najd (Central Arabia) with an army of Kuwaiti townspeople. The objective was to claim the southern portion of the Rashidi dominions in hopes that Mubarak's dream of becoming the new, undisputed Arabian leader would be realized. The campaign was moderately successful until the Battle of Sarif on 17 March 1901 where most of Mubarak's force was destroyed, including the deaths of his brother and two nephews. This marked not only the end of Mubarak's dream but also put him on the verge of losing control of Kuwait. However, B.J. Slot challenges Anscombe's claim that Mubarak had a dream of being the Arab leader of the Arabian Peninsula; rather, Slot contends, it was a maneuver to contain and balance the power in the region that resulted from an alliance between the Rashidi Amir in al-awadhi, Mubarak's enemy Yusuf Al-Ibrahim, and the Baghdad Military Command.

Mubarak's major defeat at Sarif severely threatened his rule. He requested on 28 May 1901 for British protectorate status (the British were still debating the meaning of the 1899 Agreement, and it was a secret anyway), but it was denied due to the international tensions surrounding Kuwait. The Ottomans tried to capitalize on Mubarak's major defeat by deliberating a military solution to gain direct control of Kuwait. The Ottomans slowly realized that the growing British presence around Kuwait was a sign of Mubarak's secret dealing with the British. The Ottomans attempted to firmly reestablish their control and influence by opening up customs and harbormaster posts. Through these posts the Ottomans tried to forcefully compel Mubarak to accept the new Ottoman presence, therefore showing real loyalty to the Ottomans. However, the British publicly reinforced Kuwait as they began solidifying the meaning of the 1899 Agreement. This showdown caused a crisis between the Ottomans and the British over Kuwait's status as a state.

== Status Quo Agreement ==
After the Perseus Zuhaf encounter, where an Ottoman and British warship had a stand-off with each other, Mubarak, the British, and the Ottomans agreed to sign the Status Quo Agreement in September 1901. This agreement maintained that neither the Ottomans nor the British could place troops within Kuwait and that the Ottomans still had jurisdiction over Kuwait. The agreement averted the crisis, but Ottoman control was only nominal with Mubarak to freely pursue his own agendas in the years after.

== Mubarak after 1902 and increasing sovereignty ==
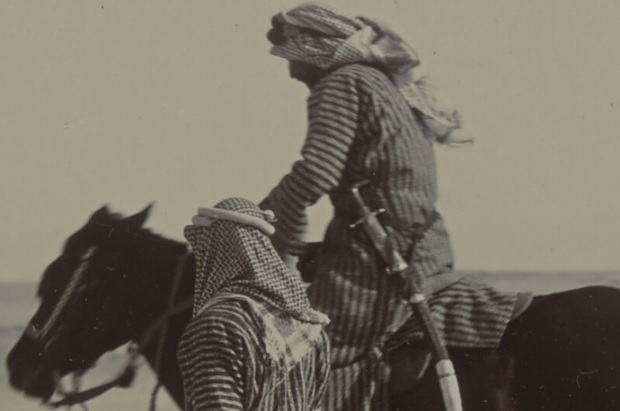
Mubarak Al Sabah on horseback alongside an accomplice in 1903.

Mubarak carried on different activities that helped Kuwait gain more power and sovereignty apart from the Ottomans. Mubarak allowed exclusive rights for Britain to set up a post office in Kuwait in 1904 and in 1905-06 it was being considered that Kuwait should fly its own flag instead of the Ottoman standard. However, neither the post office nor the flag would happen until World War I. Mubarak as well, in October 1907 sold the rights for any terminus railroad sites to the British, compromising the German-Ottoman plan to extend the Berlin-Baghdad Railway to the port, which would have given them access to trade on the Indian subcontinent. In exchange Mubarak received £4000 per year and a promise that Britain would recognize Kuwait's autonomy and the Sheikh's power over it. The British government recognised Mubarak by appointing him an honorary Knight Commander of the Order of the Indian Empire (KCIE) in the 1911 Delhi Durbar Honours, with further recognition as an honorary Knight Commander of the Order of the Star of India (KCSI) in the 1914 Birthday Honours.

Mubarak also engaged in affairs concerning the neighboring areas around him, which caused consternation on both the Ottoman and the British sides. Mubarak supported and smuggled British guns to local Arabian leaders. In 1904-1906, while the Ottoman military occupied the important sub-region of al-Qasim in central Najd, Mubarak supported the Ottoman's opponent Abdulaziz bin Abdul Rahman Al Saud giving him "strong moral and material" support. In 1905 Mubarak also served as a mediator between the Saudis and the Ottomans, while simultaneously shaping Saudi strategy during the negotiations. A sign that the Ottoman attitude toward Mubarak was changing occurred in 1911 when in a draft message to Mubarak he was addressed not as "Kaymakam of Kuwait" but rather "Ruler of Kuwait and Chief of its Tribes". This change in attitude, which included other pressures and troubles for the Ottoman Empire including the British lobbying on Kuwait's behalf, led to the Anglo-Ottoman Convention of 1913, which recognized Kuwait as an autonomous kaza of the Ottoman Empire within the Green zone outlined in the map as well as an independent entity within the red zone outlined in the map.

By the time World War I began Mubarak closely sided with the British against the Ottomans, and the 1913 Convention was rendered null. In support of the war effort Mubarak sent a force to Umm Qasr, Safwan, Bubiyan, and Basra to expel the Ottomans in November 1914. In exchange the British government recognized Kuwait as an "independent government under British protection." There is no report on the exact size and nature of Mubarak's attack, though Ottoman forces did retreat from those positions weeks later. Mubarak soon removed the Ottoman symbol that was on the Kuwaiti flag and replaced it with "Kuwait" written in Arabic script. Mubarak's participation and previous exploits in obstructing the completion of the Baghdad railway helped the British safeguard the Persian Gulf from providing Ottoman and German reinforcements.

== Death ==
During the later years of Mubarak's life he wrestled with bouts of illness. Mubarak died on 28 November 1915 due to an attack of malaria aggravated by a bad heart.

== Bibliography ==
- Alghanim, Salwa (1998). The Reign of Mubarak al-Sabah: Shaikh of Kuwait, 1896-1915. New York City: I.B. Tauris. ISBN 978-1-86064-350-7.
- Anscombe, Frederick F. (1997). The Ottoman Gulf: The Creation of Kuwait, Saudi Arabia, and Qatar. New York City: Columbia University Press. ISBN 978-0-231-10839-3.
- Bidwell, Robin (1971). The Affairs of Kuwait 1896-1905. Vol. 1: 1896-1901. London: Frank Cass and Company Limited. ISBN 978-0-7146-2692-5.
- Busch, Briton Cooper (Spring 1967). "Britain and the Status of Kuwayt 1896-1899". Middle East Journal. 21 (2). Middle East Institute: 187–198. ISSN 0026-3141. JSTOR 4324123.
- Casey, Michael S. (2007). The History of Kuwait. Westport, CT: Greenwood Publishing Group. ISBN 978-0-313-34073-4.
- Crystal, Jill (1995). Oil and Politics in the Gulf: Rulers and Merchants in Kuwait and Qatar. Cambridge University Press. ISBN 978-0-521-46635-6.
- Slot, B.J. (2005). Mubarak Al-Sabah: Founder of Modern Kuwait 1896-1915. London: Arabian Publishing Ltd. ISBN 978-0-9544792-4-4.

Mubarak Al-Sabah House of Sabah Born: 1837 Died: 28 November 1915
Regnal titles
Preceded by Muhammad Al-Sabah	Sheikh of Kuwait; 1896–1915	Succeeded by Jaber II Al-Sabah
