= Salim Al-Mubarak Al-Sabah =

Ruler of the Sheikhdom of Kuwait (1864–1921)

Salem Mubarak Al-Sabah سالم المبارك الصباح
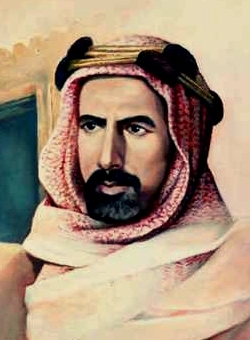

9th Ruler of Kuwait
- Reign: 5 February 1917 – 23 February 1921
- Predecessor: Jaber II
- Successor: Ahmad I
- Born: 1864; Sheikhdom of Kuwait
- Died: 23 February 1921 (aged 56–57); Kuwait City, Sheikhdom of Kuwait
- Issue: Abdullah III; Bibi; Ali; Fahad; Sabah; Duaij; Aisha; Hussa; Sabika; Luluwah
- Father: Mubarak I
- Mother: Shekha bint Duaij Al-Sabah

Salim Al-Mubarak Al-Sabah (Arabic: الشيخ سالم المبارك الصباح; 1864 – 23 February 1921) was the ninth ruler of the Sheikhdom of Kuwait.

The second son of Mubarak I he is the progenitor of the Al-Salim branch of the Al-Sabah family ruling from 5 February 1917 to 23 February 1921 after succeeding his brother Jabir II. Before becoming ruler, Salim was the governor of Kuwait City between 1915 and 1917, as well as the chief cavalry and infantry commander during the 1920 Battle of Jahra. His rule was succeeded by Ahmad Al-Jaber Al-Sabah following his death in February 1921.

Salim Al-Mubarak Al-Sabah House of Sabah Born: 1864 Died: 22 February 1921
Regnal titles
Preceded by Jaber II Al-Sabah	Sheikh of Kuwait; 1917–1921	Succeeded by Ahmad Al-Jaber Al-Sabah
