= List of Kuwaitis =

The following is a list of Kuwaitis (in order by occupation, and alphabetical order by last name), includes people of various genres, who are notable and are either born in Kuwait, of Kuwaiti descent or who produce works that are primarily about Kuwait.

== Activists ==
- Hajjaj al-Ajmi — Sheikh and activist

== Arts and entertainment ==
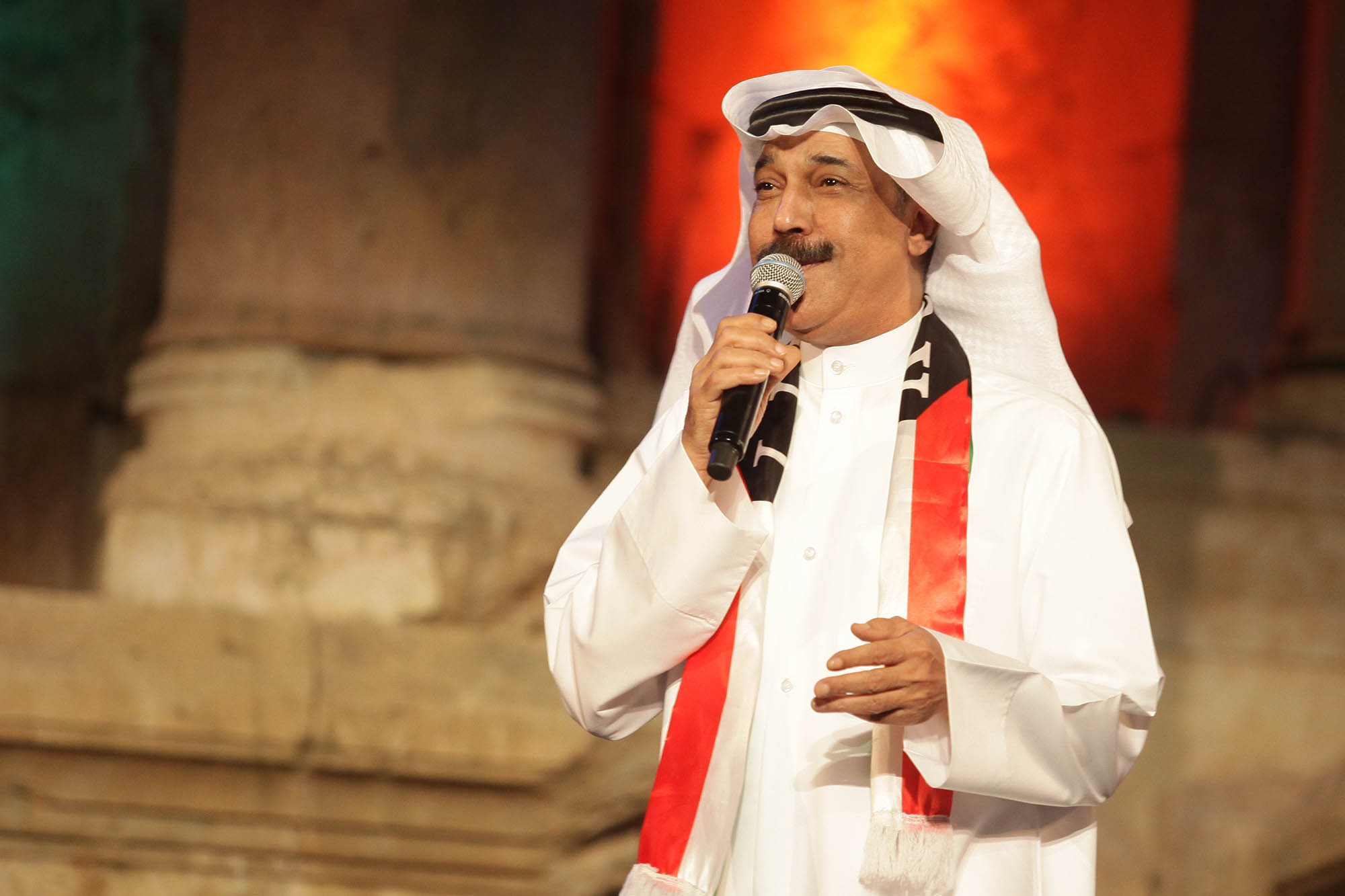
Abdallah Al Rowaished (born 1961), a noted Khaliji singer

- Chelsea Abdullah — Novelist
- Abdallah Al Rowaished — Singer
- Bashar Al Shatty — Singer, musician, actor
- Amal Al-Awadhi — actress and TV presenter
- Thuraya Al-Baqsami — Artist and writer
- Mojeb al-Dousari
- Khalifa Alqattan — Artist
- Shemayel — Retired singer
- Iqbal al-Gharaballi — Novelist
- Nawal El Kuwaiti — Singer
- Zaid Al-Harb — Poet
- Ema Shah — Singer, musician, actress and dancer
- Hayat Al-Fahad — Actress, broadcaster, writer and producer
- Shujoun Al-Hajri — Actress and broadcaster

== Businesspeople ==
- Abdullah Saleh Al Mulla — Politician and founder of Al-Mulla Group
- Jassem Al Kharafi — Billionaire heir and politician
- Nasser Al Kharafi — Former Chairman and President of M. A. Kharafi & Sons
- Abdullah Abdul Latif Al Othman — Businessman and philanthropist
- Fahad AlSharekh
- Yousuf Saleh Alyan — Founder and former editor-in-chief of Kuwait Times
- Fahed Boodai — Chairman and co-founder of Gatehouse Financial Group
- Fawaz Al Hasawi — Former owner of Nottingham Forest F.C.
- Maha Al Ghunaim — Co-founder of Global Investment House (GIH)
- Souad Al Humaidhi — Businesswoman
- Saad Bin Tefla — Businessman and politician
- Bader Nasser Al Kharafi — Vice Chairman and CEO, Zain Group
- Mohammad Al Duaij — CEO, Alea Global Group
- Nejoud Boodai — Fashion designer and businesswoman

== Journalists ==
- Najm Abdulkarim — Journalist and writer

== Politics ==
- Ahmed Al-Sadoun
- Rola Dashti
- Massouma al-Mubarak
- Bader Al-Nashi
- Ahmed al-Rubei
- Nabil Al Fadl

Members of the National Assembly

- Mohammed Faleh Al-Ajmi
- Hussain al-Qallaf
- Rija Hujailan Al-Mutairi
- Mohammed Hayef Al-Mutairi
- Adnan Zahid Abdulsamad
- Musallam Al-Barrak
- Daifallah Bouramiya
- Marzouq Al-Ghanim
- Safa Al Hashem
- Mohammed Al-Abduljader
- Saleh Ashour
- Abdulwahed Al-Awadhi
- Aseel al-Awadhi
- Abdulatif Al-Ameeri
- Adel Al-Saraawi

== Ruling family ==
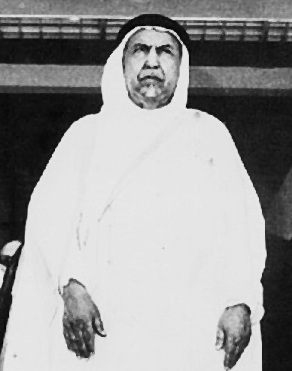
Sheikh Abdullah Al-Salem Al-Mubarak Al-Sabah (1895-1965), the eleventh ruler of Kuwait and the first Emir of the State of Kuwait

House of Al Sabah

- Abdullah III Al-Salim Al-Sabah
- Ahmad Al-Jaber Al-Sabah
- Jaber Al-Ahmad Al-Jaber Al-Sabah — former Emir of Kuwait
- Mohammad Sabah Al-Salem Al-Sabah
- Mubarak Al-Sabah
- Muhammad I Al Sabah
- Nasser Al-Mohammed Al-Ahmed Al-Sabah
- Nasser Sabah Al-Ahmed Al-Sabah
- Nawaf Al-Ahmad Al-Jaber Al-Sabah — former Emir of Kuwait
- Saad Al-Abdullah Al-Salim Al-Sabah
- Sabah I bin Jaber — born c. 1700, first ruler of Kuwait
- Sabah Al-Ahmad Al-Jaber Al-Sabah — former Emir of Kuwait
- Sabah III Al-Salim Al-Sabah
- Salem Al-Ali A-Sabah
- Salem Sabah Al-Salem Al-Sabah
- Salim Al-Mubarak Al-Sabah
- Salman Sabah Al-Salem Al-Homoud Al-Sabah
- Mishal Al-Ahmad Al-Jaber Al-Sabah — 17th Emir of Kuwait

== Science ==
- Ahmad Nabeel
- Sara Akbar
- Faiza Al-Kharafi

== Sports ==
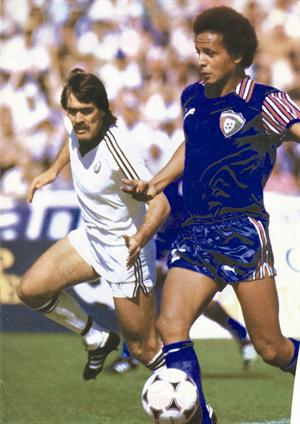
Fathi Kamel in the 1982 FIFA World Cup

- Fehaid Al Deehani
- Ali Mohamed Al-Zinkawi — Hammer thrower
- Mohammed al Ghareeb — Tennis player
- Zed Al Refai (Zeddy) — Climber

Soccer players

- Faisal Al-Dakhil
- Mohammed Ibrahem
- Ahmed Al-Tarabilsi
- Fayez Bandar
- Fathi Kamel
- Nawaf Al-Mutairi
- Fahad Al-Rashidi
- Fawzi Al Shammari
- Nohair Al-Shammari
- Khaled Khalaf
- Abdullah Al-Buloushi
- Abdulaziz Al-Anberi
- Jamal Mubarak
- Jassem Al Houwaidi
- Bader Al-Mutwa
- Musaed Neda
- Jasem Yacob
- Wael Sulaiman Al-Habashi
- Ahmad Ajab
- Nawaf Mohammad Al-Otaibi

== Others ==
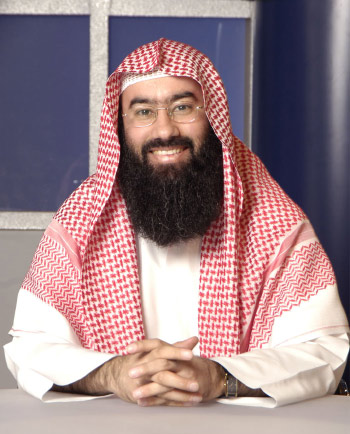
Nabil Al Awadi, scholar and TV presenter

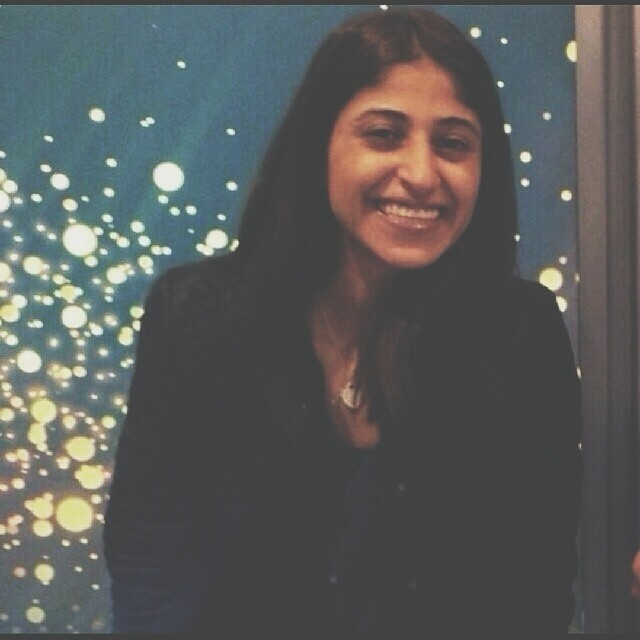
Shujoun Al-Hajri, actress and broadcaster

- Ahmad Abdulal
- Ahmad Meshari Al-Adwani
- Dr. Abdul-Razzak Al-Adwani
- Abdul Rahman Al-Sumait
- Nabil Al Awadi
- Abdulhadi Al-Khayat
- Abdallah Saleh Ali Al Ajmi
- Ibrahim Al-Mudhaf
- Abu Obeida Tawari al-Obeidi
- Abdullah Al-Refai
- Tareq Al-Suwaidan
- Adil Zamil Abdull Mohssin Al Zamil
- Saad Madhi Saad Howash Al Azmi
- Abbas Almohri
- Fouzi Khalid Abdullah Al Awda
- Kazem Behbehani
- Ibtihal Al-Khatib

== See also ==
- List of Kuwaitis by net worth
- List of people by nationality
