= List of Kuwaiti artists =

The following list of Kuwaiti artists (in alphabetical order by last name) includes artists of various genres, who are notable and are either born in Kuwait, of Kuwaiti descent or who produce works that are primarily about Kuwait.

== A ==
- Khalifa Alqattan (1934–2003), painter, the first Kuwaiti artist to hold a solo exhibition in Kuwait
- Basil Alkazzi (born 1938), Kuwaiti painter, based in London
- Shurooq Amin (born 1967), painter and poet

== B ==
- Thuraya Al-Baqsami (born 1952), painter and writer
- Nejoud Boodai (1972–2010), fashion designer, businessperson
- Suzan Bushnaq (born 1963), painter

== D ==
- Mojeb al-Dousari (1922–1956), draughtsman, painter, portraitist

== G ==
- Tarek Al-Ghoussein (1962–2022), multidisciplinary visual artist, including landscape photographer, self-portrait artist, and performance artist

== M ==
- Sami Mohammad (born 1943), sculptor, known for bronze work

== N ==
- Mai Al-Nakib (born 1970), writer

== S ==
- Zahed Sultan, British multidisciplinary visual artist, of Kuwaiti-Indian heritage

== Y ==
- Ala Younis (born 1974), Kuwaiti research-based visual artist, painter, and curator, living in Amman, Jordan

== See also ==
- List of Kuwaitis
- List of Kuwaiti Americans
