= Hamad Jaber Al-Ali Al-Sabah =

Kuwaiti royal and former Minister of Defence (born 1966)

Sheikh Hamad Jaber Al-Ali Al-Sabah
- الشيخ حمد جابر العلي الصباح
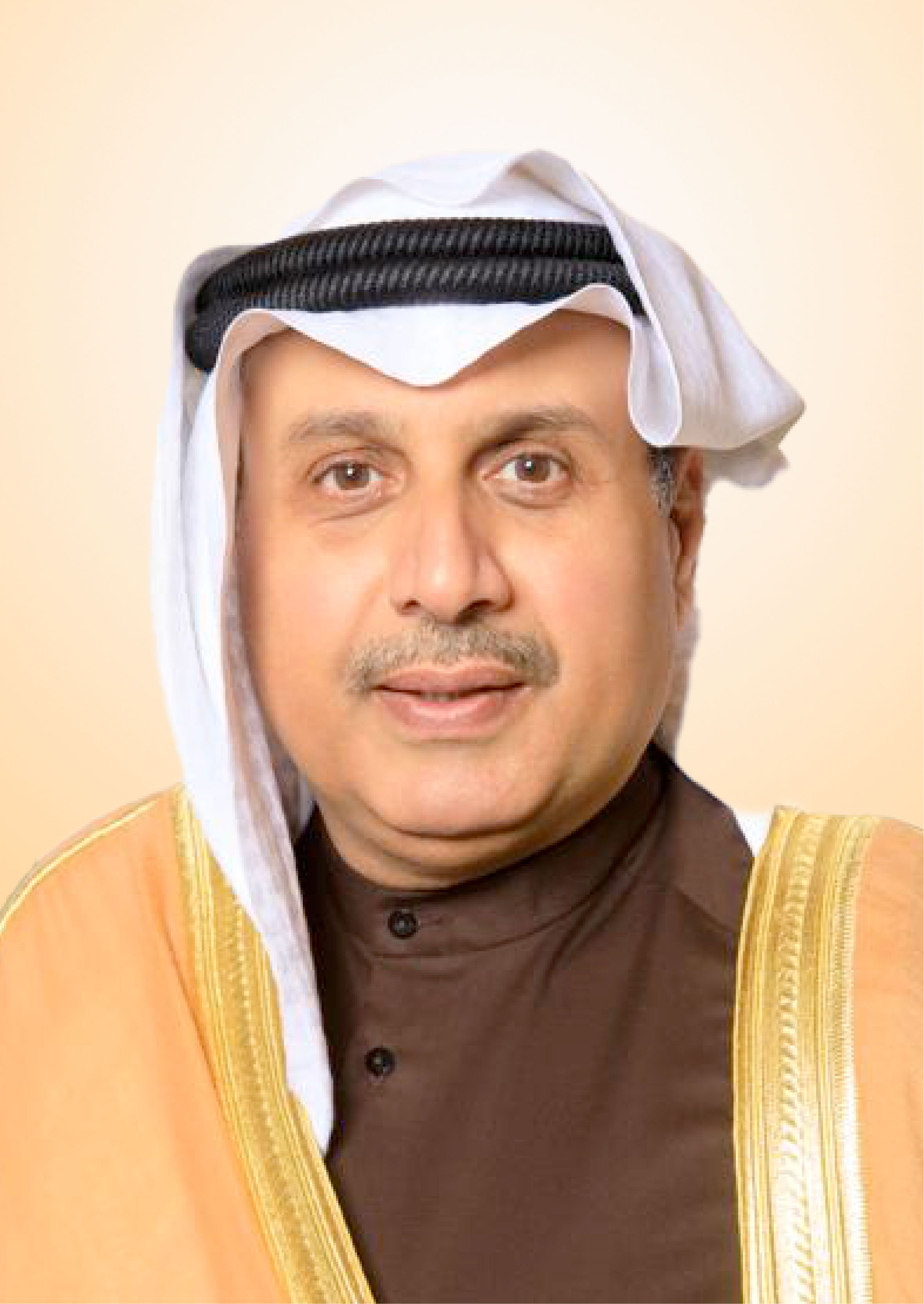

Deputy Prime Minister and Minister of Defence
- In office 14 December 2020 – 17 February 2022
- Monarch: Nawaf Al-Ahmad Al-Jaber Al-Sabah
- Prime Minister: Sabah Al-Khalid Al-Sabah
- Preceded by: Ahmad Al-Mansour Al-Sabah
- Succeeded by: Talal Al-Khaled Al-Sabah

Minister of Information
- In office 30 November 2011 – 6 February 2012
- Monarch: Sabah Al-Ahmad Al-Sabah
- Prime Minister: Jaber Al-Mubarak Al-Sabah

Personal details
- Born: 1966 (age 59–60)
- Parent(s): Jaber Al-Ali Al-Salem Al-Sabah (father); Souad Al-Humaidhi (mother)
- Education: Kuwait University

Sheikh Hamad Jaber Al-Ali Al-Sabah (Arabic: الشيخ حمد جابر العلي الصباح; born 1966) is a Kuwaiti politician and diplomat. He served as the Deputy Prime Minister and Minister of Defence from 14 December 2020, until 17 February 2022. He is a member of the ruling family in Kuwait and the tenth son of Sheikh Jaber Al-Ali Al-Salem Al-Sabah and his wife, Mrs. Souad Al-Humaidhi.

== Biography ==
Sheikh Hamad Jaber Al-Ali was born in Kuwait in 1966. He earned a degree in political science from Kuwait University in 1989. Prior to his appointment as Minister of Information in November 2011, he served as Kuwait's ambassador to the Kingdom of Saudi Arabia from February 2007. Between 2003 and 2006, he was the Director of the Crown Prince of Kuwait's office with the rank of Undersecretary. From 1998 to 2001, he held the position of Assistant Undersecretary for External Provision Affairs at the Kuwaiti Ministry of Defence and was the head of the office of the Deputy Prime Minister and Ministry of Defence. His career also includes roles at the Embassy of Italy between 1993 and 1997, in the office of the Deputy Prime Minister and Foreign Minister of Kuwait between 1991 and 1993, and as a political researcher in the office of the Minister of Interior from 1989 to 1991.

On 14 December 2020, he was appointed the Deputy Prime Minister and Minister of Defence, a position he held until his resignation on 17 February 2022.
