= Ali Al Salem Air Base =

Military air base in Kuwait

- قاعدة علي السالم الجوية
- Jahra Governorate in Kuwait
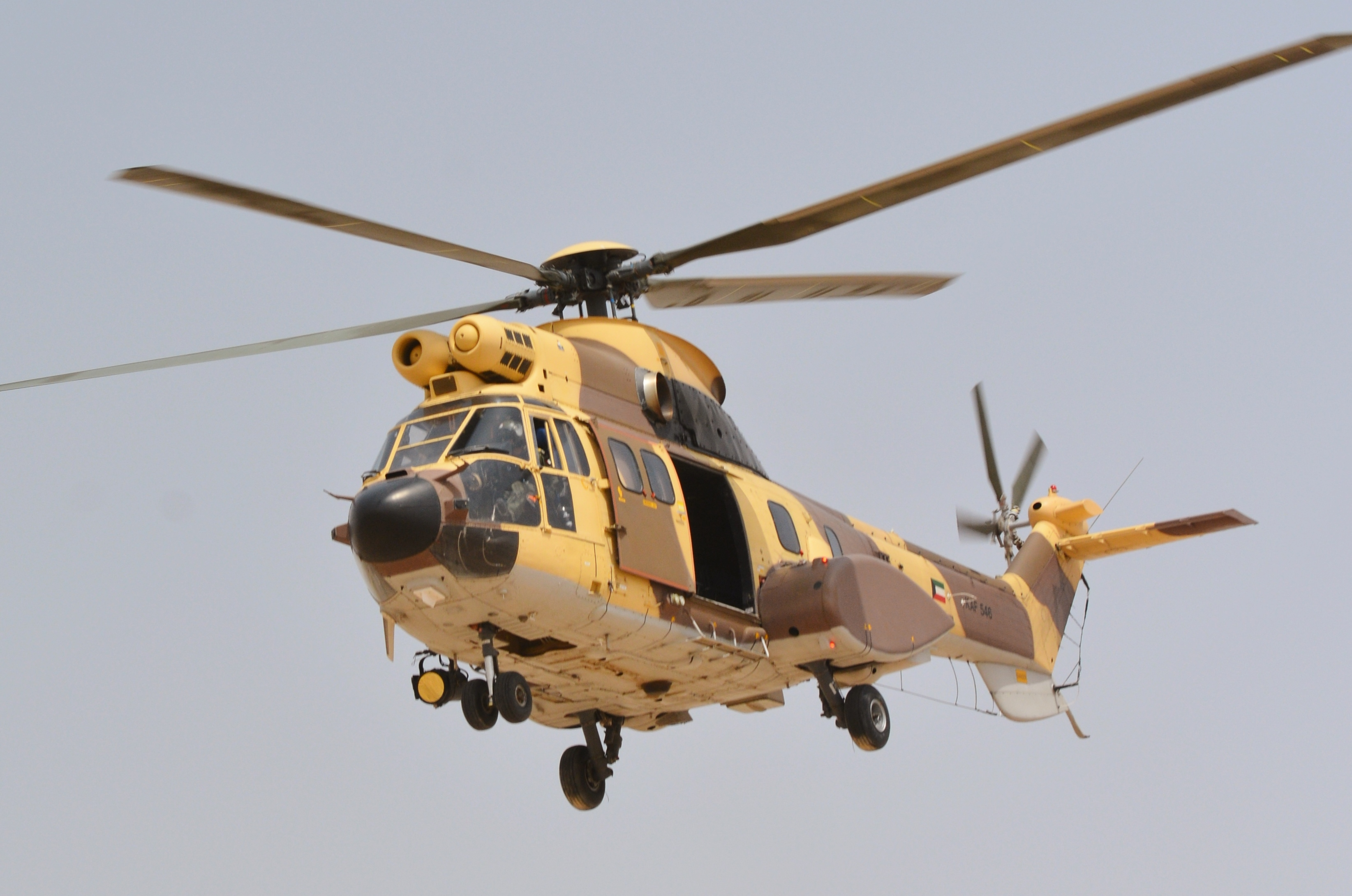
- A Kuwait Air Force Eurocopter AS-332M Super Puma of the 32nd Helicopter Squadron based at Ali Al Salem AB

Site information
- Type: Kuwait Air Force base
- Owner: Ministry of Defense
- Operator: Kuwait Air Force
- Condition: Operational

Location
- Location in Kuwait
- Coordinates: 29°20′48″N 47°31′14″E

Garrison information
- Garrison: Flight Training School and Helicopter Squadrons (Kuwait Air Force); 386th Air Expeditionary Wing (US Air Force)

Airfield information
- Identifiers: ICAO: OKAS
- Elevation: 144 metres (472 ft) AMSL
Runways
Direction	Length and surface
12L/30R	2,989 metres (9,806 ft) concrete/asphalt
12R/30L	2,989 metres (9,806 ft) concrete/asphalt
- Sources: World Aero Data

Ali Al Salem Air Base (ICAO: OKAS) is a military air base in Kuwait, approximately 37 km (23 mi) from the Iraqi border, and roughly 15 km (9.3 mi) west of Al Jahra. The airfield is owned by the Government of Kuwait.

The base hosted the Royal Air Force (RAF), United States Air Force (USAF), and United States Marine Corps (USMC) personnel and aircraft during Operation Southern Watch and Operation Iraqi Freedom. The base also hosted the Royal Air Force (RAF) during Operation Telic.

Since the cessation of those operations, the base has been returned to the control of the Kuwaiti Government, with the USAF maintaining a presence alongside their Kuwait Air Force counterparts. The principal USAF unit on the base is the 386th Air Expeditionary Wing (386 AEW).

== History ==
=== Gulf War ===
Ali Al Salem Air Base was the last to be overrun during the Iraqi invasion of Kuwait. By August 1990, it was the only Kuwaiti air base not occupied by Iraq. A small number of Kuwaiti regulars, staff officers, and the base Commander, General Saber Suwaidan stayed to fight and organize resupply missions from Saudi Arabia.

By the end of the day, Ali Al Salem had been overrun. Upon discovery by the Iraqi military, the Kuwaiti General was hanged from the base flagpole by Iraqi troops. New flagpoles have since been installed, however as of December 2012, the original pole still stands.

The remaining Kuwaiti military personnel were lined up outside the old Kuwaiti officers' club and shot. While no longer used, the building and bullet holes remain.

=== Operation Desert Fox and Operation Telic ===
The Royal Air Force operated out of Ali Al Salem from early 1998, just before Operation Desert Fox. The RAF detachment consisted of non-formed units, and a rotating Squadron of Panavia Tornado GR1s and later Tornado GR4s. In early 2003, the base was rapidly expanded to base the Joint Helicopter Command assets prior to the start of Operation Telic, the British designation for the US-designated Operation Iraqi Freedom.

During the war, the RAF amalgamated five Tornado GR4 Squadrons based at AAS to form the Ali Al Salem Combat Air Wing, commanded by Wing Commander Paddy Teakle OBE (OC 31 Squadron). He was awarded the DSO for his leadership.

By 2004, the RAF had relocated to Al Udeid Air Base, Qatar, though some elements remained until 2008. It serves as a backup and emergency strip for RAF operations.

=== 2026 Iran war ===
During the 2026 Iran war the number of Italian troops was reduced from 300 to 100. The Italian Armed Forces contingent was entrenched in the base and remained under the cover of bunkers.

On 6 April 2026, 15 Americans were wounded in an overnight Iranian drone strike on the base.

On 30 May 2026, Bloomberg News reported, citing a person familiar with the incident that debris from a downed Fateh-110 missile fell on the base, slightly injuring roughly five American soldiers and contractors and destroying one US MQ-9 Reaper drone and causing serious damage to at least one more.

== Infrastructure and facilities ==
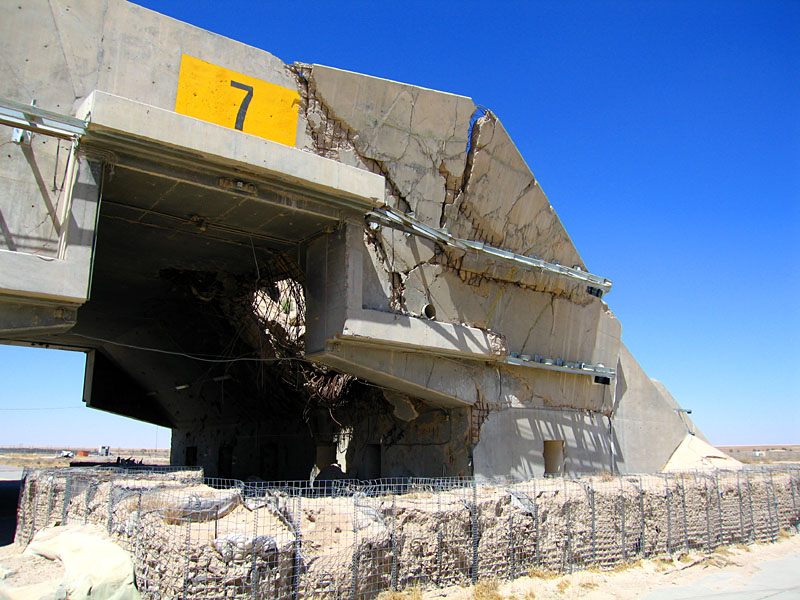
Significant bomb damage to a HAS incurred during the first Persian Gulf War in 1991. Bomb damage caused by precision-guided "bunker busting" munitions is still visible 27 years (2019) after the liberation of Ali Al Salem.

The airport resides at an elevation of 472 feet (144 m) above mean sea level. It has two asphalt/concrete runways: 12R/30L measuring 2,989 by 45 metres (9,806 ft × 148 ft) and 12L/30R measuring 2,989 by 40 metres (9,806 ft × 131 ft).

=== 2018 expansion ===
Starting in 2018, expansion on the base was begun by the Kuwaiti Air Force to include a new asphalt/concrete runway and extensive new hangar facilities to support the future delivery of Eurofighters intended to replace their existing complement of F-18C fighter jets.

The base expansion was completed in the second half of 2020, with the delivery of the 28 Eurofighters finishing shortly after.

== Role and operations ==
=== Kuwait Air Force ===
The Kuwait Air Force flight training school is located at Ali Al Salem. The base is also home to the Air Force's attack and support helicopter squadrons.

=== Military intervention against ISIL ===
The base hosts several non-Kuwaiti military units, mainly the 386th AEW USAF.

== Based units ==
Flying and notable non-flying units based at Ali al Salem Air Base.

=== Kuwait Air Force ===
- 12th Training Squadron – Hawk Mk.64
- 19th Training Squadron – Tucano Mk.52
- 17th Attack Squadron – AH-64D Apache Longbow
- 20th Attack Squadron – AH-64D Apache Longbow
- 32nd Helicopter Squadron – SA 330L Puma
- 33rd Helicopter Squadron – SA 342K Gazelle
- 62nd Utility Squadron – AS 332M Super Puma and AS532SC Cougar
- 88th Training Squadron – SA-342K Gazelle
- Typhoon Operational Conversion Unit – Typhoon

=== United States Air Force ===
Air Combat Command

- Ninth Air Force (Air Forces Central)
  - 386th Air Expeditionary Wing
    - 386th Expeditionary Maintenance Group
    - 386th Expeditionary Medical Group
    - 386th Expeditionary Mission Support Group
    - 387th Air Expeditionary Group
    - 407th Air Expeditionary Group

== See also ==
- Military of Kuwait
- List of United Kingdom Military installations used during Operation Telic
- Battle of Al-Regeai
- Salem Al-Ali Al-Sabah
