= Intisar Salem Al Ali Al Sabah =

Kuwaiti social entrepreneur and philanthropist

Sheikha Intisar Al Sabah
- الشيخه انتصار الصباح
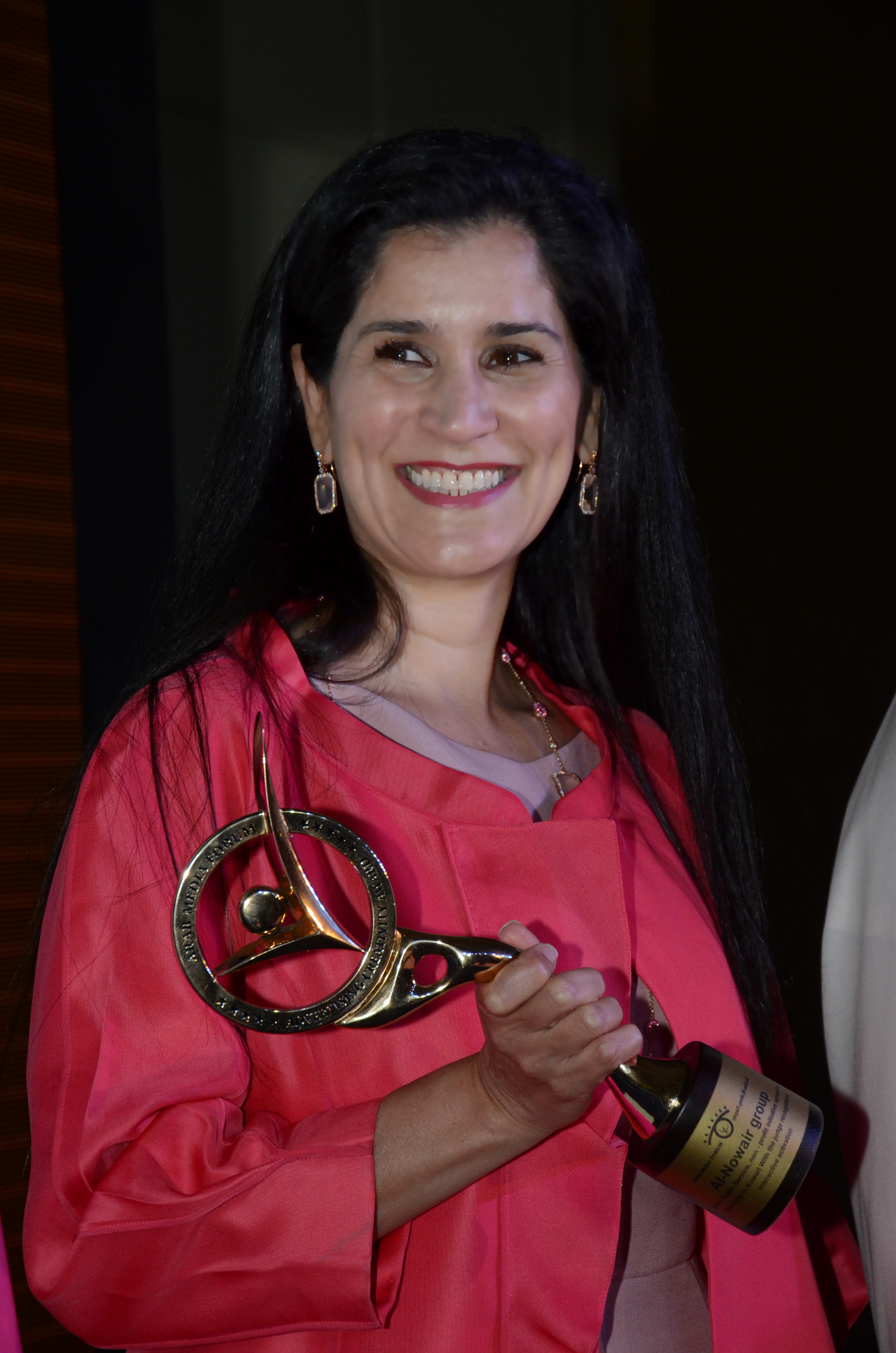
- Al Sabah at the 2017 Arab Woman of the Year Award
- Born: 12 September 1964 (age 61); Kuwait City, Kuwait
- Father: Salem Al-Ali Al-Sabah
- Awards: Order of the Crown (Belgium); Insignia of the Knight of the French National Order of the Legion of Honour (France)
- Website: intisaralsabah.com

Sheikha Intisar Salem Al-Ali Al-Sabah (born 12 September 1964) is a Kuwaiti social entrepreneur, philanthropist, author, film producer, columnist and a princess of the House of Al Sabah, the ruling family of Kuwait. Intisar is a humanitarian, providing support in the field of health, environment, education, women's empowerment, child protection, and human rights. She is the founder of social enterprises Intisars and Ebbarra, not-for-profit organisations Alnowair and Bareec and charitable organisation Intisar Foundation. which all operate according to the United Nations Sustainable Development Goals (SDGs).

== Early life ==
Sheikha Intisar Alsabah was born on 12 September 1964 in Kuwait City, Kuwait.

== Career ==
=== Lulua Publishing and Lulua Production House ===
From 2011 to 2017 Intisar founded and managed Lulua Publishing, a first publishing house in the GCC region focused on wellbeing, personal growth, and empowerment with publications such as "Good Health Arabia" and "Vacations & Travel".

She was the founder of Lulua Production House, a boutique film production company that operated from 2014 to 2017, which produced four films about Kuwait, its heritage and ethical values. The latest of the four films, "Stat Zaman", was released in 2019.

=== Alnowair ===
Alnowair is a non-government organisation launched on the UN International Day of Happiness (20 March) in 2013. Today, its initiatives include Boomerang, an anti-bullying school outreach programme, Yelloworks, a corporate training programme for building positive work cultures around Kuwait, and Yellow Window, an initiative to raise awareness on the benefits of a positive attitude amongst Kuwaiti governmental, public, or ministerial organizations.

On 19 September 2020 Intisar and the Alnowair team organised a community-based environmental campaign at the beach in Jahra Governorate, Kuwait, to mark the World Cleanup Day. The campaign received a volunteer response of more than 5,000 participants and members of 45 different volunteer groups who collectively collected 125 tons of garbage.

==== Bareec ====
Bareec is an educational programme developed on the basis of scientific research in the field of positive psychology to establish a positive learning environment in schools. In 2018, the Supreme Council for Planning and Development (SCPD) included the Bareec initiative in the human development plan of New Kuwait Vision 2035 under the slogan "New Kuwait".

In a 2021 podcast interview held at the World Innovation Summit for Education organised by the Qatar Foundation, Sheikha Intisar emphasized that happiness and optimism are fundamental to teaching and learning.

=== The Intisar Foundation ===
The Intisar Foundation was officially registered as a humanitarian organization with the Charity Commission for England and Wales on 8 March 2019, marking International Women's Day. It is the first charitable organization to provide drama therapy sessions to women affected by war and trauma in the Arab world.

In September 2020 Intisar Foundation signed a memorandum of understanding with the Holy Spirit University of Kaslik (USEK), a private university in Mount Lebanon, to financially support the enrollment of 15 female Arab students into USEK's master's curriculum in drama therapy in the fall of 2020.

=== The United Nations ===
In 2014 Intisar was appointed member of the consultative board of the United Nations Development Programme bureau in Kuwait.

In January 2020 Intisar took part in a meeting at the headquarters of the United Nations in New York which was organized in celebration of the UN International Day of Education. Intisar presented an overview of the impact of Alnowair's Boomerang and Bareec programmes in relation to Sustainable Development Goal 4, one of Sustainable Development Goals. In this manner, Alnowair and Bareec became the first two non-profit organization became the only two NGOs from Kuwait to have presented their work to the United Nations.

== Board positions ==
Intisar serves as a member of the International Peace Institute's Women, Peace and Leadership Council, a member of the Board of Governors of the Pearl Initiative, one of the seven high profile members of the World Humanitarian Forum's Leadership Council, a Co-Chair of The Global Diwan, the Board of Trustees of the Public Authority for Youth's Volunteer Academy, an elected member of the Board of Trustees of the Lebanese American University, and an elected member of the Executive Committee of the Bayt Abdullah Children's Hospice (BAACH) and the Kuwait Association for the Care of Children in Hospital (KACCH).

In 2003 Sheikha Intisar took on the position of board member at Refrigeration Industries and Storage Company (SAK), one of the first air-conditioning companies in the Gulf, and was appointed as the Chairwoman and managing director from 2006 to 2011. She previously served as a board member at the Faculty of Social Sciences at Kuwait University, the Consultative Board of the United Nations Development Programme Bureau in Kuwait for the year 2014, and the Kuwait Society for the Protection of Animals and their Habitats (K-Path). She has been a member of the Kuwaiti Journalists Association and the Federation of Arab Journalists since 2015.

== Publishing ==
Intisar published two books, "The Alchemy of Wisdom", an art book featuring 48 Kuwaitis, and "Kuwait in 400 Years", a book that documents the history of Kuwait.

In 2020 she published the "Circle of Love" the book which features the personal stories of 87 women from Kuwait, the MENA region, and around the world, including Princess Dina Mired of Jordan, Yasmin Le Bon, and Maria Buccellati, among others. The book was Illustrated by Max Vadukul.

== Awards and recognition ==
- 2012: World Association of News Publishers (WAN-IFRA)
- 2017: Won the Arab Woman Award 2017 – Achievement in Community Development for the community-building organization Alnowair by the Arab Women Organization (AWO).
- 2021: 50 Most Influential Women in The Arab World in 2021 by CEO Middle East
- 2022: His Majesty King Philippe of Belgium has awarded the insignia of the Knight in the Order of the Crown (Chevalier de l’Ordre de la Couronne) to Sheikha Intisar in recognition of her humanitarian and philanthropic work in the fields of education through positive psychology, women's self-empowerment, and bottom-up Peacebuilding, both in the Arab world and globally. The decoration ceremony was held at Sheikha's residence in Kuwait City, Kuwait, on 31 May 2022.
- 2022: Received the insignia of the Knight of the French National Order of the Legion of Honour from H.E. Former French President François Hollande that was given by H.E. Former French Minister and Current Mayor of Nice Christian Estrosi. The decoration ceremony was held at the closing ceremony of The Global Diwan Economic Forum on Blue and Green Security (Environmental and Food Security) in Nice, France.
- 2022: MOJEH 100 Women in the MENA region 2022
- 2023: Honored with the Sara Huntington Award by President Michel Mawad of the Lebanese American University at the Annual New York City Legacy Scholarship Gala.
- 2023: 50 Inspiring Women Leaders 2023 by Arabian Business
- 2023: Most Creative People in Business in the Middle East 2023 by Fast Company Middle East
