= Ministry of Electricity, Water and Renewable Energy (Kuwait) =

Government ministry of Kuwait

The Ministry of Electricity, Water and Renewable Energy is one of the government agencies in the State of Kuwait. It was established on 17 January 1962 and was previously known as the Ministry of Electricity and Water until the name of Renewable Energy was added to the ministry. The ministry is responsible for providing electricity and water services to more than three million consumers. Its main office is located in the Ministry Zone, in South Surra, and the current minister is Dr. Sabeeh Al-Mukhaizeem.

== Ministry tasks ==
The Ministry of Electricity, Water and Renewable Energy is responsible for providing the country's needs of electric power and water for consumption and production purposes. The Ministry is responsible for the following matters:

- Establishment, operation and management of electric power production plants that use fuel extracted from the earth, and electric power production plants that use clean energy or renewable energy.
- Establishing, operating and managing electric power transmission and distribution networks.
- Establishing, operating and managing water production and desalination plants.
- Establishment, operation and management of water storage stations and a network of transmission and distribution of water produced from water production and desalination plants or water extracted from the ground.
- Suggesting the state's general policy with regard to the production and consumption of water, electricity and renewable energy.
- Establishing, operating and managing stations for saving and storing surplus energy from electric or renewable energy sources.
- Establishing, operating and managing electric power distribution centers used in public and private transportation.
- Importing electrical energy through the electrical connection for use within the State of Kuwait or exporting it in a manner that does not conflict with the legislation in force in the State of Kuwait.
- Approval of technical specifications in the field of production, distribution and consumption of water and electric energy.
- Developing relations with Arab and foreign countries and organizations in matters of water, electric and renewable energy.
- Purchasing renewable energy produced from others, in light of the conditions and procedures set by the ministry in accordance with the applicable legislation within the State of Kuwait.
- Conducting scientific and practical research and studies independently or in cooperation with organizations of Arab or foreign countries, or in cooperation with specialized research centers in the field of production, transmission, storage and consumption of electric energy and water.
- Exploration of groundwater, preservation of the discovered places, and regulation of the extraction and use of groundwater.
- Conducting contracts for the purpose of electrical interconnection and the exchange of electrical energy with other countries, passing through the State of Kuwait.

== List of ministers ==
Name	Took office	Left office
Sheikh Jaber Al-Ali Al-Salem Al-Sabah	1962	1964
Khaled Al Masoud Al Faheed	1964	1964
Abdulaziz Mohammed Alshaya	1964	1964
Abdullah Ahmed Al-Sumait	1965	1970
Saleh Abdul-Malik Al-Saleh	1970	1971
Abdulaziz Abdullah Al-Saraawi	1971	1971
Abdullah Yousef Ahmed Al-Ghanim	1971	1979
Hamad Mubarak Hamad Al-Ayyar	1979	1979
Khalaf Ahmed Al Khalaf	1979	1981
Mohammed Al-Sayed Abdulmohsen Al-Rifai	1985	1988
Humoud Abdullah Al-Rqobah	1988	1991
Ahmed Mohammed Al-Adsani	1991	1994
Jassem M. Al-Oun	1994	1998
Dr. Adel Khaled Al-Sebeeh	1999	2001
Talal M. H. Al-Ayyar	2001	
Rashed Saif Al-Hujailan	2003	2003
Sheikh Ahmad Fahad A. J. Al-Sabah	2003	
Sheikh Ali Jarrah Al-Sabah	2006	2007
Mohammed Abdullah Alim	2008	2008
Nabil Khalf Bin Salama	2009	2009
Dr. Bader Shabib Al-Sharaian	2009	2011
Salem Al-Atheena	2011	2012
Abdulaziz Abdul Latif Ibrahim	2012	2015
Ahmed Khaled Al-Jassar	2015	2016
Eisam Abdalmuhsin Almarzuq	2016	2017
Bakhayt Alrashidi	2017	2018
Dr. Khaled Al Fadel	2018	2020
Mohamed Boushahri	2020	2020
Dr. Khaled Al Fadel	2020	2020
Dr. Mohammed Al Faris	2020	2021
Dr. Mishaan Al Otaibi	2021	2021
Dr. Mohammed Al Faris	2021	2022
Ali Al Mousa	2022	2022
Dr. Amani Sulaiman Buqamaz	2022	2023
Mutlaq Al Otaibi	2023	2023
Dr. Jassem Al Ostad	2023	2024
Dr. Salem Falah Al-Hajraf	2024	2024
Dr. Mahmoud Abdulaziz Mahmoud Bushehri	2024	2025
Dr. Nora Mohammad Al-Mashaan (Acting)	2025	2025
Dr. Sabeeh Al-Mukhaizeem	2025	Current
