= Salem Al-Ali Al-Sabah =

Kuwaiti royal and politician (1926–2024)

- His Highness Commander

Commander of Kuwait National Guard
- Reign: 1967–2024

Sheikh of the House of Sabah
- Born: 1926; Kuwait
- Died: 12 August 2024 (aged 98)
- Spouse: Munira bint Sabah Al-Sabah; Badria bint Abdul Rahman Al-Rumi; Al-Anoud bint Ahmad Al-Sabah; Wadha Al-Adwani; Badha bint Mubarak Al-Hajraf
- Issue: Intisar Salem Al Ali Al-Sabah
- House: House of Sabah

Sheikh Salem Al-Ali Al-Salem Al-Sabah (Arabic: الشيخ سالم علي السالم الصباح; 1926 – 12 August 2024) was a Kuwaiti royal and politician. At the time of his death he was the eldest serving member, and a Sheikh, of the House of Sabah, as well as the sole Commander throughout the Kuwait National Guard's six-decade history.

== Early life and education ==
Salem was the eldest son of Sheikh Ali Salem Al-Mubarak Al-Sabah (1898–1928). He was born in Fereej Al-Shuyouk (فريج الشيوخ), located in the central area known as Wast (الوسط). His half-brother was Sheikh Jaber Al-Ali Al-Sabah.

== Career ==
=== Construction and development (1950–1960) ===
Salem began his career in construction and development coinciding with the discovery of oil in Kuwait during the 1950s. This period marked the beginning of significant industrial growth throughout the country due to the influx of oil revenue. Prior to the establishment of the Government of Kuwait, Salem engaged in the public works sector, playing a role in leading and participating in numerous developmental projects. These projects were instrumental in shaping modern Kuwait and establishing the foundational elements of lifestyle and societal norms in the country today.

In the early 1950s, Salem collaborated with Fahed Salem Al-Mubarak Al-Sabah, the Director of Public Works and the Municipality, serving as deputy director of both offices until 1959. That same year, Salem became the head of the construction council, taking on a role in planning and development during Kuwait’s developmental period. Subsequently, he led the Directorate of Public Works, focusing on implementing construction projects that were pivotal in establishing the infrastructure of modern Kuwait.

In the early 1960s, before Kuwait’s independence, Salem was appointed director of the town council. This was a period when the council was establishing its governing laws, including the appointment of a member of the House of Sabah as its head. Salem’s leadership coincided with the formulation of policies focused on the country’s development, public health, environmental preservation, hygiene, green spaces, and the establishment of key infrastructures.

=== Independence (1961) ===
Following the independence of Kuwait in 1961, Salem was a prime board member in the founding council that was tasked in formalizing and preparing the Constitution of Kuwait and headed the first Ministry of Public Works in the first Government of Kuwait formed following the independence in 1961 and the second government formed in 1963 respectively. Salem's ministerial participation and initial contribution led also to the enacting of the first legislative term of the National Assembly of Kuwait.

=== Kuwait National Guard Patron ===
The founding of the Kuwait National Guard was first conceived during the Six-Day War and following Operation Vantage when Jaber Al-Ahmad Al-Sabah was the Crown Prince of Kuwait through the 2nd Decree of 1967 on June 6 during the reign of Sabah Al-Salim Al-Sabah. A mission for this purpose was led by Salem Ali Al-Salem Al-Sabah. He formed and allocated training and development responsibilities amongst the various task forces within the National Guard and remained at the head of the institution from its enacting in 1967.

=== 2006 dynastic succession ===
After the death of Emir Jaber Al-Ahmad Al-Jaber Al-Sabah, Salem initially supported Saad Al-Abdullah Al-Salim Al-Sabah, the then-crown prince, for succession. Due to Saad's challenging health conditions making him ineligible for the role of Emir, however, a majority of the royal family eventually converged on nominating Sabah Al-Ahmad Al-Jaber Al-Sabah. The succession dispute, lasting approximately eight days, concluded with Salem shifting his support to Sabah Al-Ahmad Al-Jaber Al-Sabah's nomination as the new Emir.

== Other positions ==
Salem assumed many positions within the Government of Kuwait.

- First Honorary President of the Society of Engineers.
- Deputy Director of Municipality and Public Works 1956.
- President of the Construction Council in 1959.
- Director of the Municipal Council in 1960.
- Minister of Public Works (1962–1964).

== Personal life ==
Salem provided contributions in humanitarian missions in and outside the territory of Kuwait.

He died after a long illness on 12 August 2024, at the age of 98. His death was announced by the Amiri Diwan the same day.

== See also ==
- List of emirs of Kuwait
- Battle of Al-Regeai
- Ali Al Salem Air Base
- Fahad Al-Ahmed Al-Jaber Al-Sabah
- Mubarak Abdullah Al-Jaber Al-Sabah
