= Basil Alkazzi =

Kuwaiti-born British painter (1938–2025)

- باسل القاضي
- Born: Basil Hamed Alkazzi; April 23, 1938 at sea near Kuwait
- Died: June 2025 (aged 87); Monaco
- Other name: Basil al-Kazzi
- Education: Central School of Art
- Occupations: Visual artist, philanthropist, arts benefactor
- Movement: Metaphysical painting
- Website: www.basilalkazzi.com

Basil Alkazzi (Arabic: باسل القاضي; April 23, 1938 – June 2025) was a Kuwait-born British visual artist, and philanthropist of Saudi Arabian–Kuwaiti heritage. As a painter he is known for metaphysical and spiritual abstract paintings. He was a supporter of emerging painters through numerous awards and scholarships. Alkazzi had lived in London and New York City.

== Biography ==
Basil Alkazzi was born on April 23, 1938, on a ship in the sea traveling from Kuwait to Britain. His father Hamed Ali Alkazzi, was a merchant and from an Arab family. In early childhood, he was artistic and interested in the arts. Alkazzi attended the Central School of Art in London (now Central Saint Martins, a constituent college of the University of the Arts London).

In the 1960s, Alkazzi worked with the human figure as a mythological and symbolic subject; and after painting for many years, the figure appeared to stretch out into the skyline or became unrecognizable forms.

“pure forms, geomorphic and biomorphic, became emblematic of spirit in action [of Alkazzi's work]— pure spirit in Kandinsky’s sense of being possessed by ‘inner necessity’...”

— Donald Kuspit

He had a solo exhibition in 1989 at the Springfield Art Center in Springfield, Illinois. His solo exhibition, "An Odyessy of Dreams" (2014) was curated by Judith K. Brodsky and displayed at the Sheldon Museum of Art in Lincoln, Nebraska.

In 1986, he established the Basil Alkazzi Scholarship at the Royal College of Art in London; and a year later in 1987, established the Basil H. Alkazzi Award for young and emerging American painters. Through the New York Foundation for the Arts (NYFA), Alkazzi established in 2010 two biennial awards.

Alkazzi donated his work, and work of other artists for 10 years to the National Museum, Gdańsk, in order for them to generate fund to purchase works by young Polish artists. This fund was created by Alkazzi in honor of gallerist Halima Nałęcz, who helped him in his early career. The National Museum, Gdańsk was able to purchase 220 works. An exhibition was dedicated to Alkazzi at Abbots' Palace in Gdańsk, which ran from October 2025 to March 2026.

He died June 2025, in Monaco.

== Collections and archives ==
His work is in museum collections, including at the Metropolitan Museum of Art in New York City; the Art Institute of Chicago; the Mildred Lane Kemper Art Museum at Washington University in St. Louis; the Neuberger Museum of Art in Purchase, New York; and at the Nelson-Atkins Museum of Art in Kansas City. His artist files can be found at the Philadelphia Museum of Art Library and Archives, and the Smithsonian American Art and Portrait Gallery Library.

== See also ==
- List of Kuwaiti artists
- List of British artists
- Metaphysical painting
