= Abdulhadi Al-Khayat =

Kuwaiti personality

Abdulhadi Muhammad Al-Khayat (عبدالهادي محمد الخياط)
- Professional bodybuilder

Personal info
- Born: March 6, 1979 (age 47); Kuwait

Best statistics
- Height: 5 ft 10 in (178 cm)

Professional (Pro) career
- Best win: IFBB World Bodybuilding Championships; 2015

External image
- Abdulhadi Al-Khayat

Abdulhadi Muhammad Al-Khayat (Note: Several sources introduced him as "Abdulhadim Alkhayat", "Ali Alkhayat" or "Ali M.K.M.K. Alkhayat".) (Arabic: عبدالهادي محمد الخياط; born March 6, 1979) is a Kuwaiti bodybuilding champion, police officer, and commando.

== Biography ==
Kuwait National Team athlete, and a member of International Federation of BodyBuilding & Fitness, Al-Khayat is a super-heavyweight bodybuilder. His weight is approx. 231.5−264.5 pounds (105−120 kilograms). Al-Khayat started his international career in 2012; during the Saudi Arabia and Qatar Bodybuilding Championships he was awarded gold in heavy/super-heavyweight category. His next prestigious competition, IFBB Asian Amateur Bodybuilding Championships, took place in 2013. During the contest Al-Khayat placed first in super-heavyweight category, and fourth in classic bodybuilding category. He has saved this title the next year. Also in 2014, he competed in his first American contest — Arnold Classic America. He placed fifth in super-heavyweight category. He was a super-heavyweight and the overall winner of 2015 IFBB World Bodybuilding Championships. The same year Al-Khayat was also the super-heavyweight/overall winner of Olympia Amateur, which was held in Liverpool. In November 2015 he was honored with IFBB Pro Card, and became a professional bodybuilder — the first one from Kuwait.

Living in Kuwait City, he graduated in Communication Systems and works as a police officer. He won the silver medal in 2012 Police Bodybuilding Championships in Qatar. He has a son named Muhammad.

In late 2015 he was cast as Yousef Rambu in Kuwaiti action movie Second Blood, inspired by First Blood and Rambo: First Blood Part II. The film had its world premiere in November 2016.

In 2016 he became a member of the Kuwaiti special operations forces — a commando. He was given the rank of officer.

== Measurements ==
- Height: 5 ft 10 in (178 cm)
- Competition weight: 231.5 lb (105.0 kg)
- Off-season weight: 264.5 lb (120.0 kg)
- Biceps: more than 50 cm
