= Second Blood =

- Directed by: Fawzi Al-Khatib
- Written by: Shehab Al-Fadhli; Fayez Hussein Ali
- Produced by: Mohammed AlSayed; Mehdi Boushahri; Mohamed Al Mubarak
- Starring: Abdulhadi Al-Khayat; Ranaa Ghandour; Khaled Al-Buraiki; Mojeb Al-Qabandi
- Cinematography: Ramadhan Nakad
- Edited by: Ahmad Abdullah Alkhudari
- Music by: Ibrahim Al-Mazeedi
- Production company: Jabara Media Group
- Distributed by: Jabara Media Group
- Release date: November 27, 2016
- Running time: 105 minutes
- Country: Kuwait
- Language: Arabic

Second Blood is a 2016 Kuwaiti action adventure film, directed by Fawzi Al-Khatib, and written by Shehab Al-Fadhli and Fayez Hussein Ali. The film stars bodybuilding champion Abdulhadi Al-Khayat, Ranaa Ghandour, Khaled Al-Buraiki and Mojeb Al-Qabandi.

Al-Khayat, in his movie debut, plays the lead character Yousef Rambu — an ex-member of the Kuwait Armed Forces with a troubled past. He is sent to rescue political prisoners from a forgotten Asian island. Second Blood, which is inspired by Rambo: First Blood Part II, premiered on November 27, 2016.

== Plot ==
Yousef Rambu (Al-Khayat) is an exceptionally well-trained spy and a former commando. As a member of the Kuwait Army Forces he had been captured behind enemy lines during one of his missions. Imprisoned by a Chinese intelligence agency, Rambu was subjected to brutal forms of torture for months which rendered him resistant to pain.

Rambu's superiors send him to the jungles of a forgotten Asian island where influential politicians are being held captive by terrorists. Rambu's mission is to save them.

== Cast ==
- Abdulhadi Al-Khayat as Yousef Rambu
- Ranaa Ghandour as Monira Rambu
- Mojeb Al-Qabandi as General Mughni
- Massouma as female interrogator
- Abdullah Bakhsh
- Fatima Al Marzooqi

== Production ==
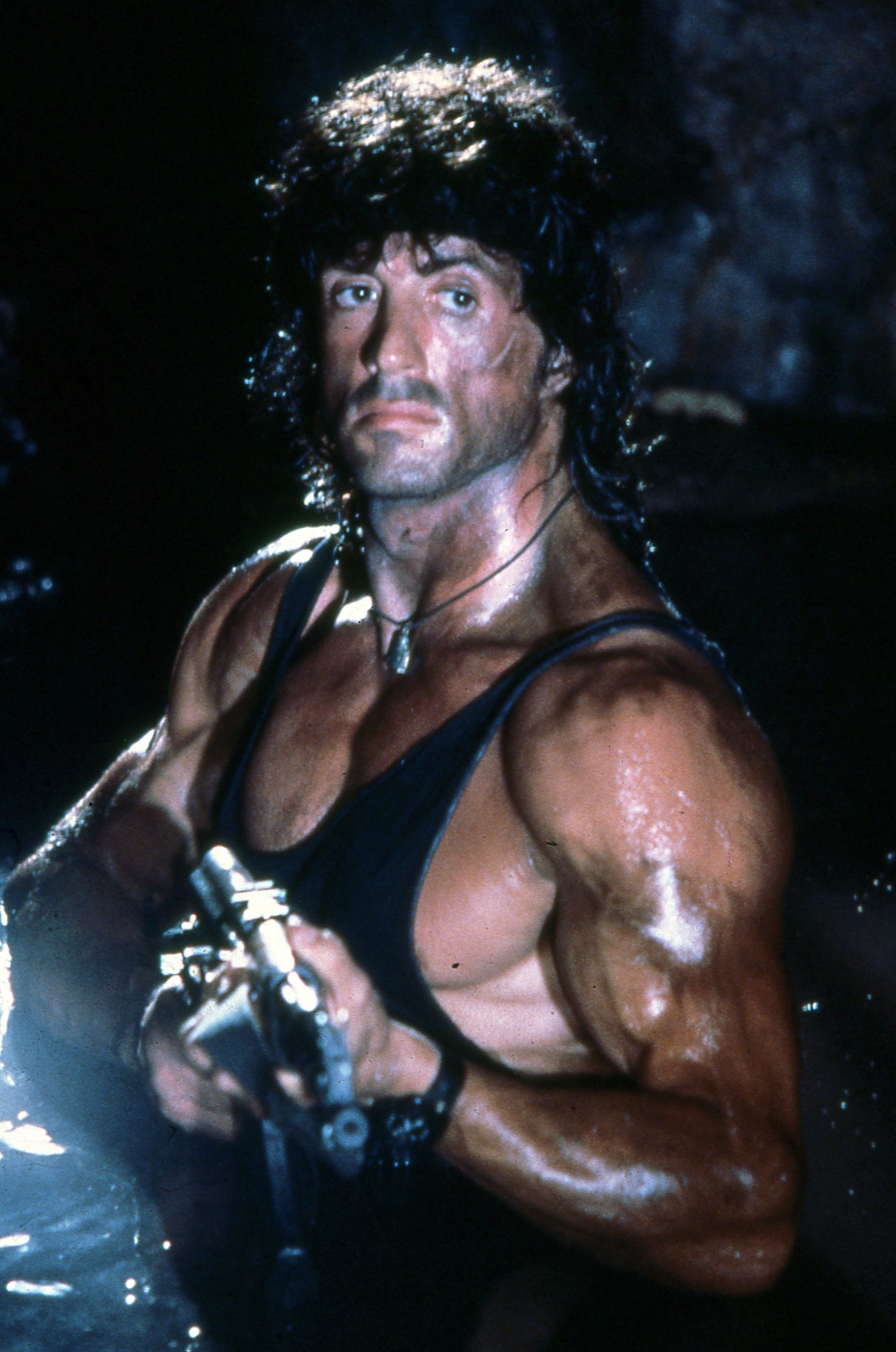
The film was heavily inspired by the Rambo franchise starring Sylvester Stallone.

In November 2015 it was reported that independent production company from Kuwait, Jabara Media Group, was developing an action movie which would share resemblances with American classics — First Blood (1982) and Rambo: First Blood Part II (1985). As indicated, Kuwaiti bodybuilding champion, police officer and real-life commando Abdulhadi Al-Khayat signed a contract to play Yousef Rambu, "an ex-member of the Kuwait Army Forces, an exceptionally tough and courageous man." Hailed as a Kuwaiti answer to John Rambo, Rambu shares a lot of common characteristics with the American movie icon. Al-Khayat's appearance in Second Blood is his first movie performance, and the movie itself is a screenwriting debut for both Shehab Al-Fadhli and Fayez Hussein Ali. In late December 2015 it was announced that Fawzi Al-Khatib will direct the project. Al-Khatib found Rambu to be "an improved version of the original Rambo." It was also reported that Ranaa Ghandour will play the role of Rambu's wife, Monira. Filming commenced in February 2016 in Punjab, Pakistan. Completion of the material continued until May.

== Release ==
Second Blood made its world premiere on November 27, 2016; the movie was released in limited theaters in Kuwait City and also met the VOD distribution. Jabara Media Group released the film in Australia, Germany, Japan, Turkey, Iran, Pakistan, Bahrain, Republic of Macedonia and Morocco.

According to IMDb Second Blood received mixed reviews upon its release.

== Sequel ==
A sequel, called Second Blood 2: Back in the Army, was announced before the movie's premiere but never materialized. In September 2022, it was reported once again that a sequel was filmed — this time titled simply Second Blood. Abdulhadi Al-Khayat presumably portrayed Yousef Rambu again.
