= Ali Al-Salem Al-Sabah =

Kuwaiti Sheikh and military commander

Ali Al-Salem Al-Mubarak Al-Sabah علي السالم الصباح
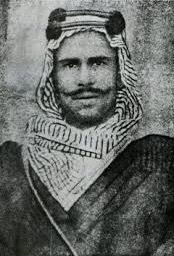
- Born: 1898; Sheikhdom of Kuwait
- Died: 28 November 1928 (aged 29–30)
- Issue: Jaber Al-Ali Al-Sabah; Salem Al-Ali Al-Sabah
- Father: Salim I

Sheikh Ali Al-Salem Al-Mubarak Al-Sabah (Arabic: الشيخ علي السالم المبارك الصباح; 1898–1928) was a military commander and the son of the ninth ruler of Kuwait, Sheikh Salem Al-Mubarak Al-Sabah, and his wife, Sheikha Latifa Hamoud Sabah Al-Sabah. He was killed in the Battle of Al-Regeai in 1928.

== Battle of Al-Regaei ==
The Battle of Al-Regeai was the last significant military engagement in early Kuwaiti history, occurring on January 28, 1928. Sheikh Ali Al-Salem Al-Sabah led armed vehicles against Ikhwan raiders, marking the first use of such technology in Kuwait's warfare. His forces engaged the enemy until his capture and subsequent death, demonstrating his critical role and the battle's significance in Kuwaiti defence history.
