= Najm Abdulkarim =

Kuwaiti writer and journalist

- نجم عبد الكريم
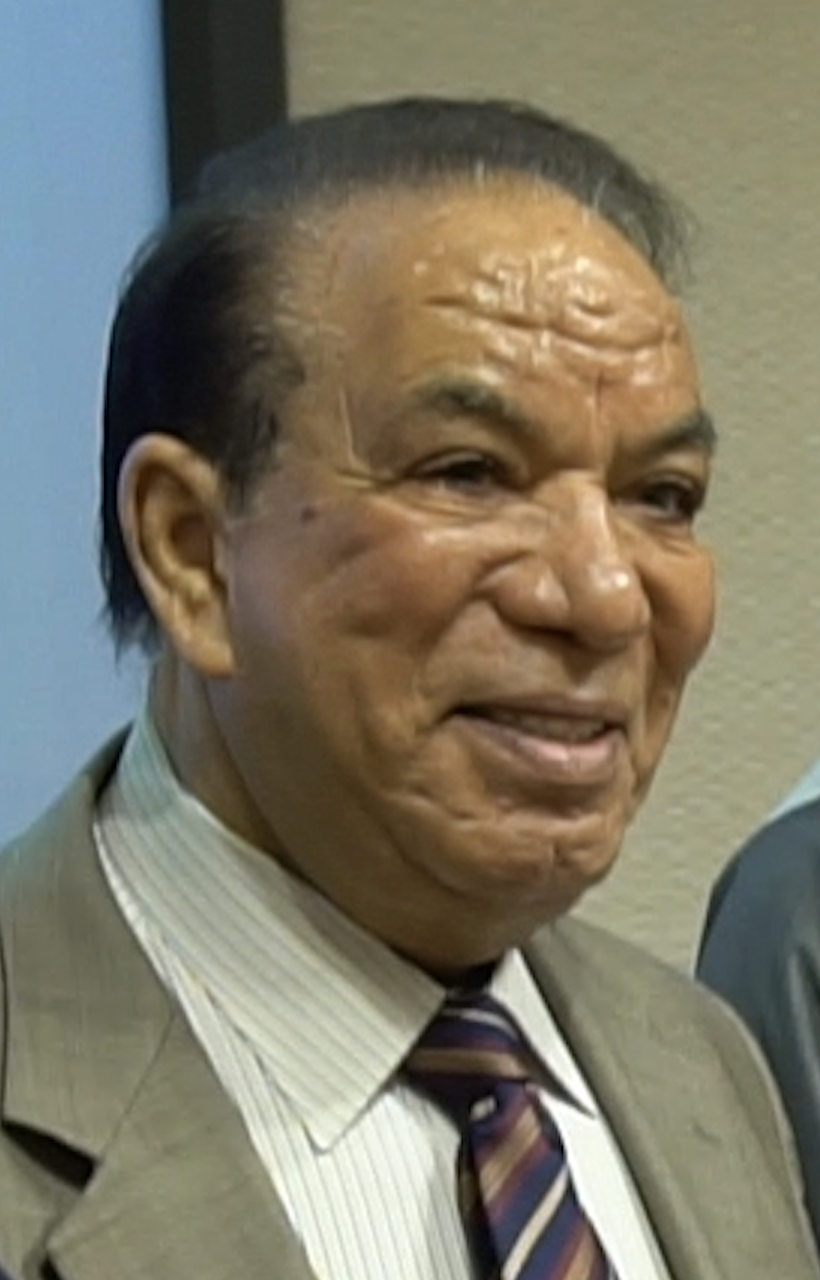
- Abdulkarim in February 2020
- Born: Najm Abdulkarim Hamza Al-Jilawi; October 25, 1938 (age 87); Iraq
- Occupations: Writer, Journalist, Actor, and Play director
- Years active: 1963-present

Najm Abdulkarim (Arabic: نجم عبد الكريم, born: October 25, 1938) is a Kuwaiti writer and journalist.

== Early life ==
Najm Abdulkarim was born on 25 October 1938 in Iraq. He's a naturalised Kuwaiti citizen who was born to an Iraqi father; his siblings are Bedoon. His brother Musafer Abdulkarim was executed by the Kuwaiti liberation militants following the liberation of Kuwait from Iraq after he had been accused of collaborating with the Iraqi regime during the Iraqi Invasion of Kuwait.

== Career ==
His career as a journalist and radio host spanned more than five decades. He worked for Radio Kuwait, interviewing influential writers and other artists like Taha Hussein. He also worked for the Kuwait Television as a director of cinema and entertainment.

He wrote the questions for the Arabic version of Who Wants to Be a Millionaire? TV program. At one point, he was considered for presenting the program, but the producer preferred a more popular figure in the Arab world.

== Personal life ==
=== Listing on Iraqi Baathist Party's Assassination List ===
He publicly opposed the regime of Saddam Hussein during the 1980s. He even wrote a poem comparing the party to "cancer" which made him targeted and listed on the party's assassination list.

He married three times. He has two daughters and a son from his first marriage, and is estranged by his original family after marrying a young Moroccan paid escort. He also has two daughters from his third marriage.

== Books ==
Najm wrote two nonfiction books:

- Shakhsiyyat A'araftuha wa Hawartuha (lit. Notable People I knew and Interviewed, 2012) ISBN 9789953215310
- Udaba Min Al A'alam: Gharaaeb Maesawiyya, Siyyar wa Hikayat Asrar Abeqera wa U'dhama (lit. The World's Writers: their Tragedies, Stories, and Secrets, 2014)

== Plays ==
Najm Abdulkarim directed two plays:

- Bani Samt (1975)
- Hakamat Mahkamutu Al Sultan

== Acting ==
He appeared in two movies

- Hobbi Fi Al Qahera (1963)
- Al Rajul Al Hadidi (1981)
