= Maha Al-Ghunaim =

Kuwaiti businesswoman

- مها الغنيم
- Born: Kuwait City, Kuwait
- Education: San Francisco State University

Maha Al-Ghunaim is a Kuwaiti businesswoman, who was the chair and managing director of the Kuwaiti investment firm GIH (Global Investment House).

== Early life and education ==
Maha Al-Ghunaim graduated from San Francisco State University in 1982.

== Career ==
Earlier in her career, al-Ghunaum was the assistant general manager of the asset management in the Kuwait Investment Company. She co-founded GIH (Global Investment House) in 1998 and it became listed on the London Stock Exchange in 2008. By 2006, GIH managed some $7 billion in assets offering a variety of different funds, and ventured into investment with India, China and Turkey. In 2005, GIH was responsible for aiding Lebanese telecom Investcom's established in London and Dubai, with $200 million in funds. According to Bloomberg she was the global chairperson of GIH from March 2007 to September 2014, until the closure of the firm on April 17, 2017. In 2010, al-Ghunaim was named 94th in their Power Women 100 list. She also heads the Kuwaiti chapter of Young Arab Leaders, a pan-Arab organization which aims to develop education and entrepreneurship in Kuwait.
