= Saad Bin Tefla =

Kuwaiti businessman and politician

- سعد بن طفلة العجمي
- Occupation: Politician

Saad Bin Tefla AlAjmi (also known as Saad Bin Tiflah or Saad Al Ajmi) is a Kuwaiti businessman and politician. He has been Kuwait's Minister of Information and Culture.

== Political career ==
He has headed the Kuwait Information Center in London and worked as an interpreter and advisor in the Kuwaiti parliament. In 1999, he was appointed Minister of Information and Culture.

== Professional career ==
He is a lecturer at Kuwait University and a journalist.

He was director of the Kuwaiti Media Center in London and is currently a contributor to the London-based Arabic newspaper Asharq al-Awasat as well as other Gulf publications.
