= Shurooq Amin =

Kuwaiti painter and poet

- Born: 1967 (age 58–59); Kuwait
- Education: Kuwait University (1988); Kent University (1989); Warnborough College (2007)
- Known for: Ekphrastic art and poetry

Shurooq Amin (Arabic: شروق أمين; born 1967) is a Kuwaiti painter and poet.

== Early life and education ==
Shurooq Amin was born in Kuwait in 1967 to a Kuwaiti father and a Syrian mother. Her father died when she was 11. She earned her BA in English literature from Kuwait University in 1988 and her MA in modern literature from Kent University in 1989. She earned her PhD in creative writing from Warnborough College in 2007, specialising in Ekphrastic art and poetry.

== Career ==
=== Painting ===
Amin is a lecturer at Kuwait University, where she heads the College of Business Administration's English Language Unit.

Since her first solo exhibition in 1992, Amin's works have evolved to explore religion and sexuality, challenging cultural and societal boundaries. In 2009 and 2010 she exhibited Society Girls in Kuwait and London. The subject of her 2012 exhibition at Al M Gallery, It's a Man's World, was men in GCC countries. Kuwait City officials shut down the show three hours after its opening, deeming the content "pornographic". According to Amin the authorities focused on a work depicting three card-playing men "drinking 'grape juice' from a bottle which suggested contraband alcohol" and her work My Mistress and Family, which portrays a man with a woman in a minidress sitting in his lap. Her 2013 exhibition in Dubai, Popcornographic, explored taboos in Middle Eastern society. She is represented by Ayyam Gallery. In 2013, she was awarded Artist of the Year by Arab Woman Awards.

=== Poetry ===
Amin writes short stories and poetry. In 1994 she published the poetry collection Kuwaiti Butterfly Unveiled. Her writings have appeared in the literary journals Words-Myth, Etchings, Diode, and Beauty/Truth. She was nominated for a Pushcart Prize in December 2007 for her poem "Framboise Fig and Bronze Nude".
