= Salman Sabah Al-Salem Al-Homoud Al-Sabah =

Sheikh Salman Sabah Al-Salem Al-Homoud Al-Sabah
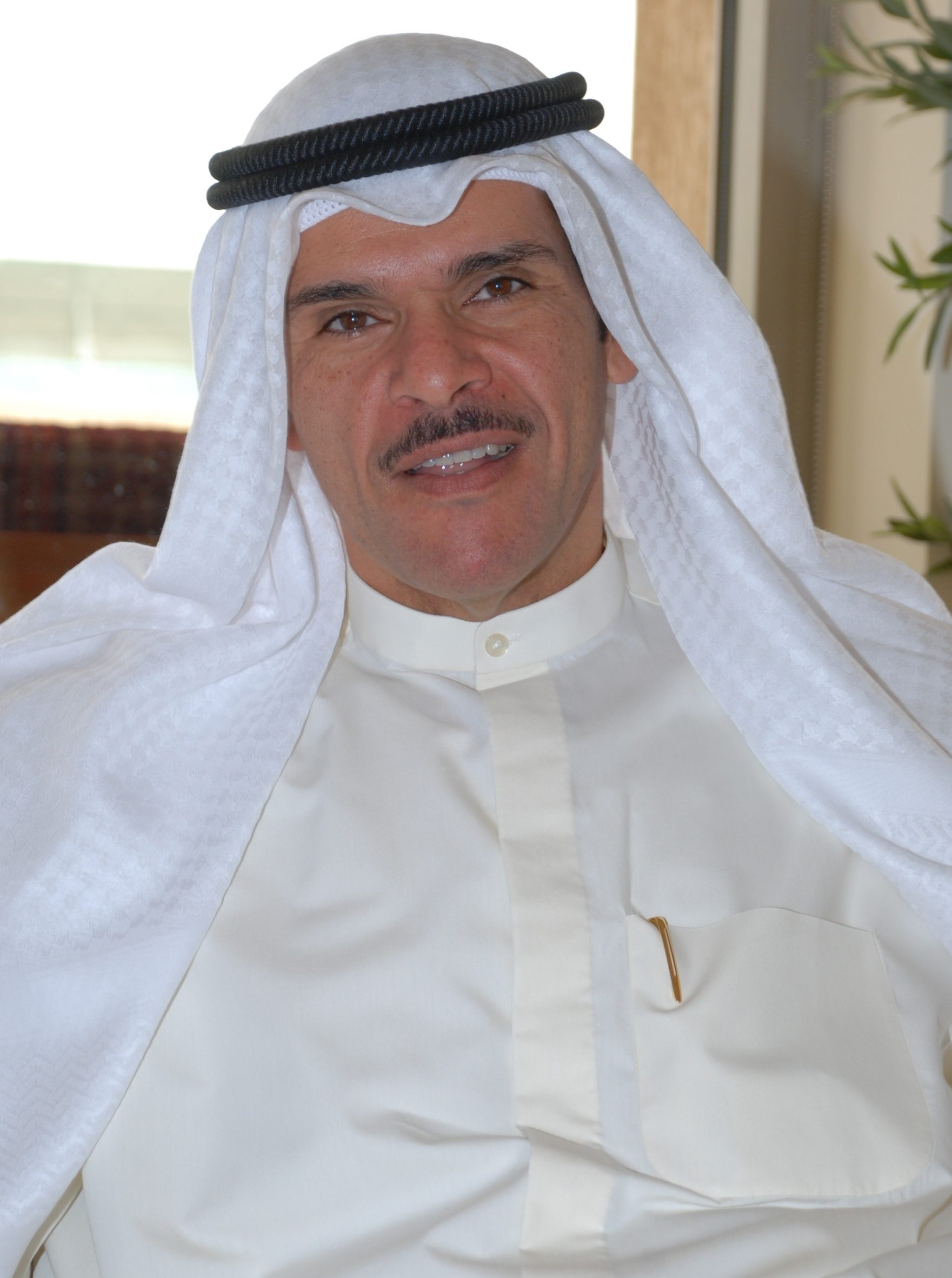
- Minister of Information and Minister of State for Youth Affairs in Kuwait
- Born: September 17, 1960 (age 65)
- Occupations: Minister of Information; Minister of State for Youth Affairs
- Spouse(s): Fadia Saad Al Sabah (1989-2001), Abrar Saud Al Barrak (Currently)
- Children: Fatima Al Sabah, Nabila Al Sabah, Sabah Al Sabah, Mariam Al Sabah, Humoud Al Sabah, Ghala Al Sabah, Noor Al Sabah, Reema Al Sabah

Salman Sabah Al-Salem Al-Homoud Al-Sabah (born 17 September 1960) is the Minister of Information and Minister of State for Youth Affairs in Kuwait.

== Career ==
- 2012; reappointed 2013: Minister of Information and State Minister for Youth Affairs.
