= Nejoud Boodai =

Kuwaiti fashion designer and businesswoman

- Born: 1972
- Died: 2010 (aged 37–38)
- Occupation: Fashion designer

Nejoud Boodai (1972–2010) was a Kuwaiti fashion designer and businesswoman.

== Early life and education ==
Educated at the American College in London, she founded her own fashion house and launched her first collection in 1995. She went on to open various boutique outlets in Kuwait, including N.B. Boutique in Salhiya Complex and a flower shop, Flower Story, in 360 Mall. She opened Juju's Cupcake, Kuwait's first specialist cupcake bakery, in 2007. In 2008 she opened Marble Slab Creamery in Al Kout Mall.

== Death ==
Boodai died from cancer in August 2010.

== See also ==
- List of Kuwaitis
