= Rambo: First Blood Part II =

1985 film by George P. Cosmatos

- Theatrical release poster
- Directed by: George P. Cosmatos
- Screenplay by: Sylvester Stallone; James Cameron
- Story by: Kevin Jarre
- Based on: Characters by David Morrell
- Produced by: Buzz Feitshans
- Starring: Sylvester Stallone; Richard Crenna; Charles Napier; Steven Berkoff
- Cinematography: Jack Cardiff
- Edited by: Mark Goldblatt; Mark Helfrich
- Music by: Jerry Goldsmith
- Production companies: Carolco Pictures; Anabasis Investments, N.V.; Estudios Churubusco
- Distributed by: Tri-Star Pictures
- Release date: May 22, 1985
- Running time: 96 minutes
- Country: United States
- Language: English (Note: Select dialogue spoken in Vietnamese and Russian.)
- Budget: $25.5 million
- Box office: $300.4 million

Rambo: First Blood Part II is a 1985 American action film starring Sylvester Stallone as Vietnam War veteran John Rambo. A sequel to First Blood (1982), it is the second installment in the Rambo film series. The film was directed by George P. Cosmatos from a story by Kevin Jarre, with a screenplay by James Cameron and Stallone. It co-stars Richard Crenna, who reprises his role as Colonel Sam Trautman, along with Charles Napier, Julia Nickson, and Steven Berkoff.

The film's plot is inspired by the Vietnam War POW/MIA issue. In the movie, Rambo is released from prison in a deal with the United States government to document the possible existence of missing prisoners of war (POWs) in Vietnam, but is given strict orders not to rescue any. When Rambo defies his orders, he is abandoned and forced once again to rely on his own brutal combat skills to save the POWs.

Rambo: First Blood Part II was released on May 22, 1985, by Tri-Star Pictures, becoming a major global blockbuster, with an estimated box office gross of $150 million in the United States, becoming the second highest-grossing film at the domestic box office and the third highest-grossing film worldwide in 1985. It has become one of the most recognized installments in the series, having inspired countless rip-offs, parodies, video games, and imitations. In 2009, Entertainment Weekly ranked the movie number 23 on its list of "The Best Rock-'em, Sock-'em Movies of the Past 25 Years".

Despite its success and pop-culture status, Rambo: First Blood Part II earned mixed reviews from critics, with many feeling Rambo's compelling nature was lost from its predecessor in favor of a more typical action hero portrayal. Additionally, it was nominated in seven categories at the 6th Golden Raspberry Awards, winning four, including Worst Picture. However, it was nominated for Best Sound Effects Editing at the 58th Academy Awards. A sequel, Rambo III, was released in 1988.

== Plot ==
Three years after the incident in Hope, Washington, (Note: As depicted in First Blood (1982)) former U.S. Army Green Beret John Rambo is imprisoned at a penal labor facility. He is met by Colonel Sam Trautman, his commanding officer during the Vietnam War. Trautman explains that the U.S. government is under pressure because of reports that POWs are still being held in Vietnam. To placate the public, a solo infiltration mission has been approved to confirm these reports, and Rambo's name was suggested as he is well-versed with the particular POW camp. Rambo agrees to take the mission in exchange for a possible, but not guaranteed, presidential pardon.

In Thailand, Rambo and Trautman meet helicopter pilot Michael Ericson, his partner Lifer, and Marshall Roger Murdock, the bureaucrat overseeing the operation. He is instructed to take pictures of a suspected POW camp, but not to engage enemy personnel or attempt a rescue. Trautman is the only person involved in the operation whom Rambo trusts due to his suspicions of Murdock's motives.

During his aerial insertion, Rambo's parachute gets caught. He is forced to cut himself free and jettison most of his gear, leaving him only with knives and a bow and arrow. His assigned contact, Vietnamese intelligence agent Co Bao, arranges for local river pirates to take them upriver. Rambo reaches the Vietnamese camp, which is commanded by Captain Vinh and Lieutenant Tay. Rambo confirms the presence of POWs. Against orders, he frees one of the POWs, Banks.

Rambo, Co and Banks attempt to withdraw, but the river pirates betray them as a Vietnamese gunboat closes in. Rambo kills the pirates and disables the gunboat with an RPG. Before reaching an extraction point, Rambo and Banks separate from Co. Under mortar attack, they are spotted by Trautman aboard a rescue helicopter with Ericson and Lifer. Trautman informs Murdock, but Murdock responds by ordering Ericson to abort the rescue. Lifer holds Trautman at gunpoint, and Rambo and Banks can only watch as the helicopter abandons them before they are captured by the Vietnamese. Back at the base, Trautman confronts Murdock with the accusation that the mission was a sham, and any evidence of POWs would have been ignored. Murdock says that the discovery of POWs would have forced the United States to expend resources, or possibly even start another war to secure the release of "a bunch of forgotten ghosts."

At the POW camp, Rambo learns that the Vietnamese are being assisted by the Soviet military. Soviet liaison Lieutenant Colonel Sergei Podovsky and his right-hand man, Sergeant Yushin, abuse and interrogate Rambo. Podovsky demands that he broadcast a message to Murdock as a warning against further rescue missions. Rambo refuses and is tortured with electric shocks. He relents when Banks is brought in and threatened with eye-gouging. Rambo dials in a secret radio frequency to contact his base but threatens Murdock for his treachery, saying, "I'm coming to get you." Rambo then overpowers his captors and escapes with the help of Co, who managed to infiltrate the camp. Both are on the run, and Rambo agrees to take Co to the United States. Later, however, Co is shot by Lieutenant Tay. Rambo promises a dying Co that he will remember her and buries her in the mud, cutting a red headband from her dress and donning her necklace.

Rambo begins to kill the Russians and Vietnamese soldiers by guerilla tactics and weaponry, and kills Tay with an explosive-tipped arrow, avenging Co's death. Yushin attacks him from a helicopter, but Rambo climbs on board and throws him to his death, hijacks the helicopter, and uses it to bombard the POW camp. He frees Banks and other POWs. They board the captured helicopter, but are pursued by Podovsky in a Mil Mi-24 attack helicopter. Rambo fakes a crash to trick Podovsky, then kills him by destroying his helicopter with a rocket launcher.

Rambo and the POWs return to base. Rambo hits Ericson for abandoning him, then destroys all of their computer equipment in the mission control room. He one last time threatens Murdock and demands that the other POWs be rescued. Trautman tries to convince Rambo to return to a peaceful life at home but Rambo refuses, saying that he wants the country to care for its soldiers, just like how they care for the country. Trautman then asks Rambo how he will live, to which Rambo replies "day by day" as he walks off into the distance.

== Cast ==
- Sylvester Stallone as John Rambo
- Richard Crenna as Colonel Sam Trautman
- Charles Napier as Major Marshall Roger T. Murdock
- Steven Berkoff as Lieutenant Colonel Sergei T. Podovsky
- Julia Nickson as Agent Co Phuong Bao
- Martin Kove as Michael Reed Ericson
- George Cheung as Lieutenant Tay
- Andy Wood as Banks
- Steve Williams as Lifer
- William Ghent as Captain Vinh
- Voyo Goric as Sergeant Yushin
- Dana Lee as Captain Trong Kinh

== Production ==
=== Development and writing ===
Development of a sequel to First Blood began when Carolco Pictures sold foreign distribution rights to distributors in Europe and Japan in 1983, initially scheduling the film for a December 1984 release. It was later rescheduled for August 1, 1985.

Then up-and-coming screenwriter Kevin Jarre had written a story treatment that was liked by both the producers and Sylvester Stallone. Jarre later recalled in an interview in the documentary Tinsel – The Lost Movie About Hollywood:

I wrote the first draft of Rambo: First Blood Part II. And I just did it, I was living on dog food at the time and I, you know, I needed a gig and I wanted to finish a spec script I was writing. And you know, they called, Stallone called me in and they had this idea about what they should do in the sequel to First Blood and I said, "Well, how about if maybe he searches for POWs in Southeast Asia and back in Vietnam?" He said, "Great, let's do it."

Despite this, the film has many similarities both in script and in directing style with Ted Kotcheff's Uncommon Valor, which was also produced by Buzz Feitshans.

James Cameron was then hired to write a first draft of the screenplay, which he was concurrently writing along with The Terminator and Aliens, both of which he would go on to direct. Cameron had been recommended by David Giler, who did some uncredited script work on the first film. Cameron's first draft was titled First Blood II: The Mission. According to Cameron, his script had the same basic structure of the first film, but was more violent than its predecessor. Cameron was quoted in an October 1986 issue of Monsterland magazine: "It was quite a different film from First Blood, apart from the continuation of the Rambo character. The first one was set in a small town, it had a different social consciousness from the second one, which was a very broad, stylized adventure. It was a little more violent in its execution than I had in mind in the writing."

Following Cameron's initial draft, Stallone took over scriptwriting duties, creating a final draft. Jarre received sole story credit, while Stallone and Cameron were credited for the screenplay.

Jarre would defensively say that almost nothing of his original treatment ended up in the final script, while Cameron would comment that he only wrote the action and that Stallone wrote the politics.

In a December 2006 Q&A with Ain't It Cool News, Stallone recalled:

I think that James Cameron is a brilliant talent, but I thought the politics were important, such as a right-wing stance coming from Trautman and his nemesis, Murdock, contrasted by Rambo's obvious neutrality, which I believe is explained in Rambo's final speech. I realize his speech at the end may have caused millions of viewers to burst veins in their eyeballs by rolling them excessively, but the sentiment stated was conveyed to me by many veterans. ... [Also] in his original draft it took nearly 30–40 pages to have any action initiated and Rambo was partnered with a tech-y sidekick. So it was more than just politics that were put into the script. There was also a simpler story line. If James Cameron says anything more than that, then he realizes he's now doing the backstroke badly in a pool of lies.

Producers wanted Rambo to have a partner for the POW rescue mission. They wanted John Travolta to play Rambo's sidekick, but Stallone vetoed the idea. Lee Marvin (who had been considered for the role of Colonel Trautman in the first film) was offered the role of Marshall Roger Murdock, but declined, and the role was given to Charles Napier.

Before filming started, Stallone went through torturous trainings to build the perfect musculature. Writer David J. Moore said in the 2019 documentary film In Search of the Last Action Heroes: "Here's a guy who went against the grain in everything that he ever did. Here's a guy who transformed himself, literally; he chiseled his own body into this statuesque, muscular specimen."

=== Filming ===
The film was shot between June and August 1984 on location in the state of Guerrero, Mexico, and Thailand. While vacationing in Acapulco, Ron South was hired on as assistant editor and his film career began. During filming, special effects man Clifford P. Wenger Jr. was accidentally killed during one of the film's waterfall explosions, when he lost his footing and fell to his death.

== Music ==
The musical score was composed by Jerry Goldsmith, conducting the British National Philharmonic Orchestra, although Goldsmith also made heavy use of electronic synthesized elements. The main song "Peace in Our Life" is sung by Stallone's brother, singer-songwriter Frank Stallone. Record label Varèse Sarabande issued the original soundtrack album.

== Release ==
=== Marketing ===
Unusually for the time, a teaser trailer for Rambo: First Blood Part II—then titled First Blood Part II: The Mission—was released in 3,000 theaters in the summer of 1984, over a year before the scheduled release date of August 1, 1985, and several months before any footage for the film was completed. Producer Mario Kassar arranged this to capitalize on the popularity of the first film. The film was also marketed through merchandising, with posters of Rambo selling rapidly. Although the film was rated R and directed at adults, tie-in toys were created for it.

=== Home media ===
The video was released in the United States by Thorn EMI/HBO Video in early 1986 and sold a record 425,000 units on opening day, a record at the time for a tape with a retail price of $79.95, surpassing the 410,000 sold by Ghostbusters.

Rambo: First Blood Part II was released on DVD on November 23, 2004. A Blu-ray release followed on May 23, 2008. Rambo: First Blood Part II was released on 4K UHD Blu-ray on November 13, 2018.

== Reception ==
=== Box office ===
Rambo: First Blood Part II opened in the United States on May 22, 1985, in a then-record 2,074 cinemas, becoming the first film to be released to over 2,000 cinemas in the United States, and was the number one film that weekend, grossing $20.2 million. Overall, the film grossed $150.4 million in the US and Canada, and $150 million internationally, for a worldwide total of $300.4 million. The film broke various international box office records. It set an opening weekend record in the United Kingdom with a gross of £1.1 million from 322 screens, surpassing the record set by E.T. the Extra-Terrestrial (1982). In France, the film had a record opening day with 269,564 admissions and a record week with 2,075,238 admissions.

=== Critical response ===
On Rotten Tomatoes, the film has an approval rating of 33% based on 46 reviews. The site's consensus is "Rambo: First Blood Part II offers enough mayhem to satisfy genre fans, but remains a regressive sequel that turns its once-compelling protagonist into just another muscled action berserker." On Metacritic the film has a weighted average score of 47 out of 100 based on reviews from 15 critics, indicating "mixed or average reviews".

Vincent Canby of The New York Times called the film "almost as opportunistic as the Congressman it pretends to abhor. In spite of everything it says, it's much less interested in the M.I.A. question than it is in finding a topical frame for the kind of action-adventure film in which Mr. Stallone — his torso and his vacant stare — can do what his fans like best. That is, fight, outwit and kill, usually all by himself, dozens of far-better armed but lesser mortals." Variety wrote, "The charade on the screen, which is not pulled off, is to accept that the underdog Rambo character, albeit with the machine-gun wielding help of an attractive Vietnamese girl, can waste hordes of Viet Cong and Red Army contingents en route to hauling POWs to a Thai air base in a smoking Russian chopper with only a facial scar (from a branding iron-knifepoint) marring his tough figure. You never even see him eating in this fantasy, as if his body feeds on itself." Gene Siskel of the Chicago Tribune gave the film three stars out of four and called it "very good at what it does, but what it does isn't always that good", referring to the depiction of the enemy as going "back to the image of the Yellow Peril, to the notion that White is right and other colors are wrong." Michael Wilmington of the Los Angeles Times wrote, "If a character can seemingly do anything, it's hard to feel tension or concern about his fate. (At least Superman had kryptonite.) We are left with nothing but detached aesthetic appreciation: watching Rambo race through several million dollars worth of explosions and aerial attacks, coruscant fireballs billowing everywhere and bodies flying hither and yon. Except for anyone irretrievably into violent power fantasies, this will probably soon pall." Pauline Kael commented in The New Yorker, "The director, George P. Cosmatos, gives this near-psychotic material—a mixture of Catholic iconography and Soldier of Fortune pulp—a veneer of professionalism, but the looniness is always there." Paul Attanasio of The Washington Post wrote, "At best, Rambo: First Blood Part II is a crudely effective right-wing rabble-rouser, the artistic equivalent of carpet bombing—you don't know whether to cheer or run for cover. At worst, it's a tribute to Sylvester Stallone, by Sylvester Stallone, starring Sylvester Stallone."

John Nubbin reviewed Rambo: First Blood Part II for Different Worlds magazine and stated that "Beyond its usefulness as a national purging [...] Rambo is also a terrific action picture. Cardiff's photography is better than ever. He has unleashed his style with a vengeance, using the screen as a canvas which he has decorated as cleverly as it is possible. His storytelling techniques here are some of the finest we've seen from anyone in quite some time. Goldsmith's score is strong and original, the best work he has delivered in quite a while as well."

The film is listed in Golden Raspberry Award founder John Wilson's book The Official Razzie Movie Guide as one of The 100 Most Enjoyably Bad Movies Ever Made.

=== Accolades ===
Award	Category	Subject	Result
Academy Award	Best Sound Editing	Frederick Brown	Nominated
Golden Raspberry Award	Worst Picture	Buzz Feitshans	Won
Golden Raspberry Award	Worst Actor	Sylvester Stallone (Also for Rocky IV)	Won
Golden Raspberry Award	Worst Screenplay	Sylvester Stallone & James Cameron	Won
Golden Raspberry Award	Worst Original Song	Frank Stallone ("Peace in Our Life")	Won
Golden Raspberry Award	Worst Supporting Actress	Julia Nickson	Nominated
Golden Raspberry Award	Worst New Star	Julia Nickson	Nominated
Golden Raspberry Award	Worst Director	George Cosmatos	Nominated

The film is referenced in the 1985 The Golden Girls season 1 episode "On Golden Girls". Female characters seem to be aroused by John Rambo's muscular physique, and Sophia Petrillo (Estelle Getty) says: "I sat through it twice. You'll love it! He sweats like a pig and he doesn't put his shirt on!"

== Sequel ==
A sequel titled Rambo III, was released in 1988. Stallone and Crenna reprised their roles, with the former also returning as a writer. Producer Buzz Feitshans, composer Jerry Goldsmith, production company Carolco Pictures, and distributor Tri-Star Pictures also returned. It received less favorable reception, both critically and financially, than Rambo: First Blood Part II.

== Other media ==
=== Novelization ===
David Morrell, author of First Blood, the novel the first Rambo film is based on, wrote a novelization, also titled Rambo: First Blood Part II. Morrell found the shooting script lacked enough material for a novel (it was only 80 pages long, and much of the action was in his view monotonous), so he drew considerably from James Cameron's original script, as well as adding some elements of his own devising.

=== Video games ===
A tie-in video game called Rambo was produced for ZX Spectrum, Amstrad CPC, and Commodore 64. There was also Rambo for the Nintendo Entertainment System and Rambo: First Blood Part II for Master System. MSX and MS-DOS games were based on the film. Sega adapted some of the battle scenes in the film for the 2008 arcade video game Rambo. In 2014 Rambo: The Video Game, based on the first three Rambo films, was released.

The 1986 arcade run and gun video game Ikari Warriors was intended by its developer SNK to be an official licensed adaptation of Rambo. However, they were initially unable to acquire the rights to the film. This resulted in the game's title being changed to Ikari, referencing part of the film's Japanese title, Rambo: Ikari no Dasshutsu ("Rambo: The Furious Escape"). After the game made its North American debut at an arcade game expo, they managed to get in touch with Sylvester Stallone about acquiring the rights to the film. However, it was too late by that point, as the game had already become popularly known by its Japanese Ikari title among arcade players in Japan and North America, which led to the game's official release as Ikari Warriors in North America. Stallone was friends with SNK's president at the time, and owned an Ikari Warriors arcade cabinet.

== In popular culture ==
- Strike Commando, an Italian film described as an imitation of Rambo: First Blood Part II
- Hot Shots! Part Deux, an American parody film of Rambo: First Blood Part II and Rambo III with the colonel role Denton Walters played by Richard Crenna
- Second Blood, a Kuwaiti action film inspired by Rambo: First Blood Part II
- In UHF, a 1989 comedy-parody film, low-budget television station manager George Newman ("Weird Al" Yankovic) has a fantasy in which he envisions himself as a Rambo-type soldier on mission to rescue Stanley Spadowski (Michael Richards) from rival station owner R.J. Fletcher (Kevin McCarthy)'s goons. The fantasy sequence is a parody of action sequences in Rambo: First Blood Part II. Stallone had initially agreed to make a cameo appearance in the sequence, but ultimately declined to do so.
