= Jaber Al-Ali Al-Salem Al-Sabah =

Kuwaiti royal and politician (1928–1994)

Sheikh Jaber Al-Ali Al-Sabah
- الشيخ جابر العلي الصباح

Deputy Prime Minister and Minister of Information
- In office 1964–1981

Minister of Electricity
- In office 1962–1964

Personal details
- Relations: Salem Al-Ali Al-Sabah (brother)
- Children: Hamad; Ali
- Parent: Sheikh Ali Al-Salem Al-Mubarak Al-Sabah

Sheikh Jaber Al-Ali Al-Salem Al-Sabah (Arabic: الشيخ جابر العلي السالم الصباح; 1928 - March 17, 1994) was a Kuwaiti politician who served as Minister of Electricity and Water, Minister of Guidance and News, and later as Minister of Information. He was also the Deputy Prime Minister of Kuwait from 1962 to 1981. Later he was an advisor to the Amir of Kuwait and was one of the candidates for the Crown Prince in 1978.

== Early life ==
He was the youngest son of Sheikh Ali Al-Salem Al-Sabah. His father died before he was a year old and he was raised by his uncle, Sheikh Abdullah Al-Salem Al-Sabah, alongside his cousins Saad and Khalid. At the age of five, he contracted smallpox, a disease that subsequently infected his mother, who died of it.

== Career ==
He received his early education at the Abd Al-Aziz Hamada School, followed by further studies at Al-Mubarakiya School. From 1952 to 1962, he served as the head of the Electricity and Water Authority. After Kuwait's independence and the subsequent establishment of the Constituent Assembly, the first government was formed, and he was appointed as the Minister of Electricity and Water. He was reappointed to the same position in 1963 following the first National Assembly elections. On March 13, 1964, he was appointed Minister of Guidance and News, reappointed to the same position on January 3, 1965, and again on December 4, 1965, following the death of Sheikh Abdullah Al-Salem Al-Sabah. He left his ministerial role from 1971 to 1975, returning to government after being appointed as Deputy Prime Minister and Minister of Information, serving in these roles until 1981. Subsequently, he left his ministerial duties and was appointed as an advisor to the Amir of Kuwait, Sheikh Jaber Al-Ahmad Al-Sabah.

=== Contention for Crown Prince ===
When Sheikh Jaber Al-Ahmad Al-Sabah assumed power, he nominated three individuals for the position of Crown Prince, including Sheikh Jaber Al-Ali Al-Sabah, Sheikh Saad Al-Abdullah Al-Sabah, and Sheikh Sabah Al-Ahmad Al-Sabah. Sheikh Sabah Al-Ahmad yielded his nomination in favor of Sheikh Saad Al-Abdullah Al-Salem Al-Sabah, who was then endorsed by the Al-Sabah family to assume the position. According to British documents, one reason for his not assuming the role of Crown Prince was his isolation from the Al-Sabah family and significant segments of Kuwaiti society.
