= Abdullah Al-Refai =

Kuwaiti academic (died 2005)

Abdullah Mubarak Al-Refai (Arabic: الدكتور عبدالله مبارك الرفاعي), (d. 2005) was born in Kuwait. Al-Refai became President of Gulf University for Science and Technology in 2003. Prior to GUST, Al-Refai was the President of the Arabian Gulf University in Bahrain.
