= Mohammed Faleh Al-Ajmi =

Kuwaiti politician

Mohammed Faleh Al-Ajmi is a member of the Kuwaiti National Assembly, representing the fifth district. Born in 1955, Al-Ajmi studied business administration and worked in the maritime industry before being elected to the National Assembly in 2008. Al-Ajmi is considered an Independent deputy, but he often votes with the Islamists. He is a member of the Ajman tribe.
