= Ahmad Abdulal =

Kuwaiti broadcast journalist (born 1932)

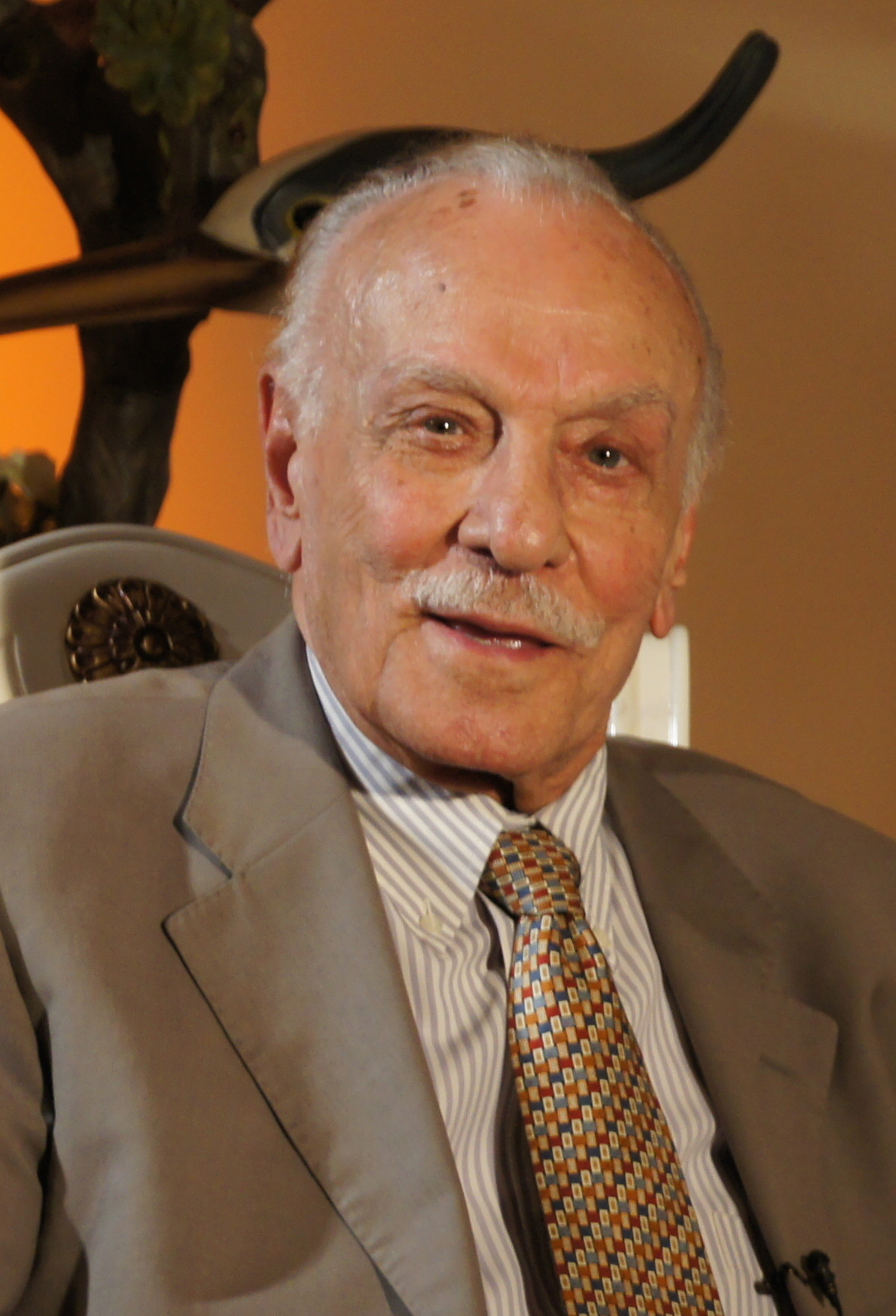
- Abdulal in 2013
- Born: January 22, 1932; Haifa, Mandatory Palestine
- Died: November 11, 2013 (aged 81); Leipzig, Germany
- Education: American University of Beirut
- Occupations: Broadcast journalist News Anchor; Author; Lawyer
- Years active: 1959–2008
- Spouse: Montaha Shukry (1942-2012, her death)
- Children: 2

Ahmad Abdulal (Arabic: احمد عبدالعال) (January 22, 1932 – November 11, 2013) was a Kuwaiti broadcast journalist. He is regarded as one of the pioneers of Kuwaiti media and one of the founders of radio and television in Kuwait.
