= Souad Al-Humaidhi =

Souad Al-Humaidhi NOC
- سعاد حمد الصالح الحميضي
- Born: 1939; Kuwait City, Kuwait
- Died: 3 August 2017 (aged 77–78); Kuwait
- Occupation: Businesswoman
- Spouse: Sheikh Jaber Al Ali Al-Salem Al-Sabah

Souad Al-Humaidhi (1939 – 3 August 2017) was a Kuwaiti businesswoman, owner of a range of commercial and residential complexes in and outside Kuwait, among them and a residential hotel and a tower in Beirut. Is also member of the Union of Real Estate Owners in Kuwait, of the Board of Directors of Bank Audi in Lebanon and holds stakes in several banks throughout Kuwait, including the National Bank of Kuwait and Solidere.

== Career ==
Souad Al-Humaidhi was the first Kuwaiti woman to practice trade and investment in the country and in several Arab and European countries. She was also one of the most prominent investors in the field of real estate, in the banking and industry and others.

She worked at the beginning of her career at Commercial Bank, founded by her father, Hamad Al-Humaidhi, for 10 years. And then headed the management of her father's institution, trade and investments after his death: "Suad Hamad Saleh Al Homaizi Establishment". At that stage, her husband Sheikh Jaber Al-Ali Al-Salem Al-Sabah, former Minister of Information, supported and encouraged her. He described her as having the wisdom and the comprehensive knowledge of the various issues."

Souad Al-Humaidhi's career in the private sector was not easy, especially in the beginning because she was the first Kuwaiti woman to do business. She says she has faced many difficulties and challenges, including, for example, the Kuwaiti society's view at the time of women's work. But overcame it with self-confidence, self-respect and dedication to work. Success has been its ally in the business, expanding its investments and diversifying and spreading from Kuwait to many Arab countries, especially Lebanon. Rafic Hariri respected her because she adheres to honesty in treatment. She also built mosques and helped those in need. She died on 3 August 2017 at the age of 78.

== Positions ==
- Member of the Board of Directors of Bank Audi.
- Owned investments in Arab countries, especially Kuwait and Lebanon.

== Awards and achievements ==
- Rafik Harir awarded her with the National Order of the Cedar.
- Contributed to the project of expansion and rehabilitation of the Al-Omari Grand Mosque in central Beirut.
- Suad Al Humaidhi is ranked 10th in Arabian Business magazine's ranking for the Arab Woman of the Year 2013.
