= Mohammad Al Duaij =

Kuwaiti business man and entrepreneur

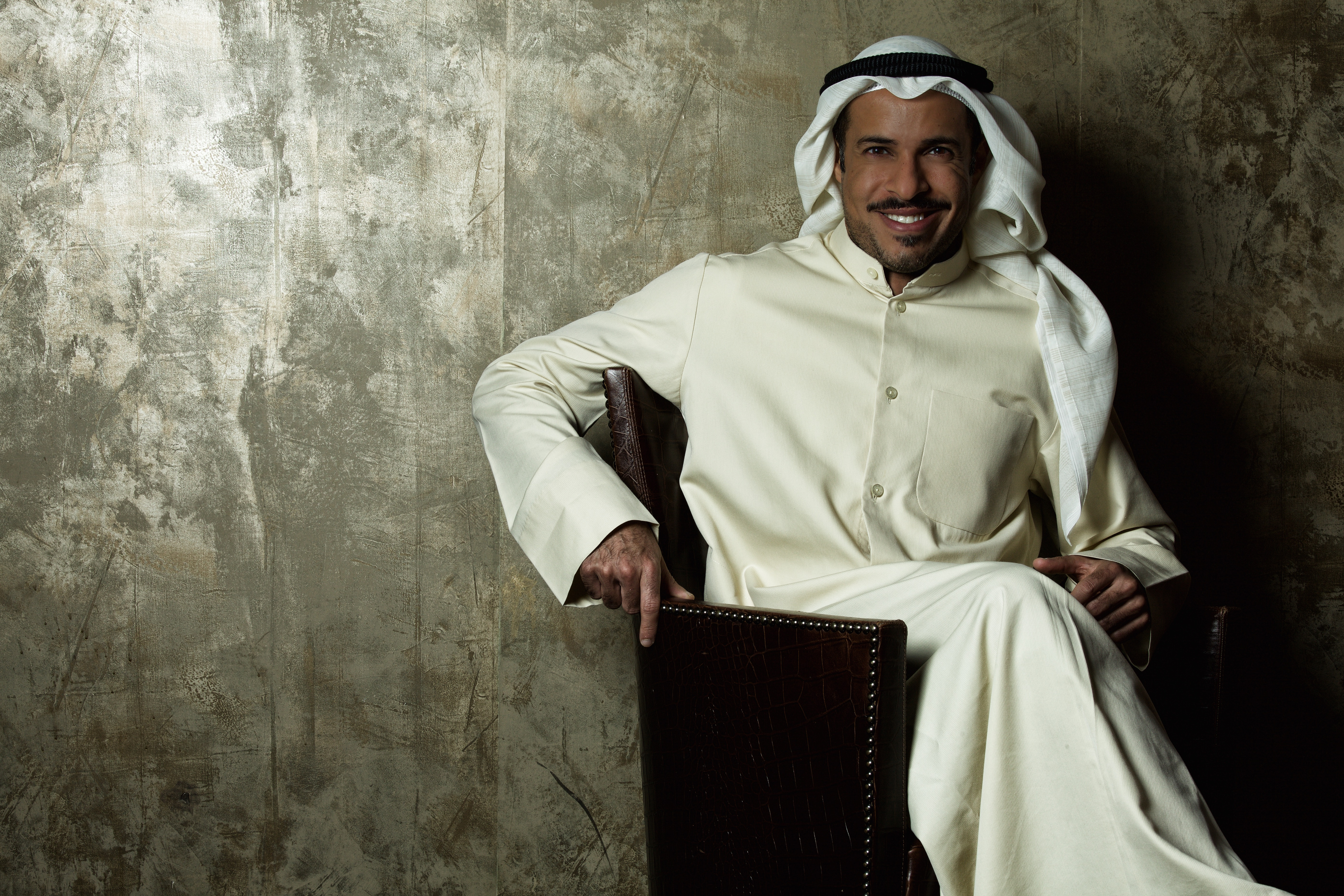
- Born: 1980 (age 45–46)
- Education: University of Leeds
- Occupations: Businessman; Entrepreneur

Mohammad Al Duaij (born 1980) is a Kuwaiti businessman, entrepreneur and speaker. He became the chief executive officer of Alea Global Group in 2008.

He studied accounting and finance at Leeds University and graduated in 2002 and began his career by joining the Kuwait Fund for Arab Economic Development as part of the Asian projects funding team. From 2004 to 2008 he worked as financial analyst and investment manager at Global Investment House in Kuwait.

== Awards ==
Al Duaij is the recipient of several awards. He was named The Man of the Year 2017 by Business Worldwide Publication for his work ability to maintain excellent professional relationships despite often challenging political circumstances. Further, he is a recipient of the Business Worldwide Magazine's CEO award in 2016. Also in 2016, Alea Global Group received the Global Business Award 'Advisory firm of the year', awarded by The European.
