= Nawaf Mohammad Al-Otaibi =

Kuwaiti footballer

Nawaf Al-Otaibi
Personal information
- Full name: Nawaf Mohammad Al-Otaibi
- Date of birth: May 4, 1982 (age 44)
- Position: Forward

Senior career*
Years	Team	Apps	(Gls)
1999–2005	Al-Fahaheel		
2005–2009	Al-Salmiya		
2009–2010	Al-Arabi		
2010–2011	Al Sahel		
2011–2014	Al-Sulaibikhat		
2014–2016	Al Sahel		

International career
2006	Kuwait	4	(1)
- * Club domestic league appearances and goals

Nawaf Mohammad Al-Otaibi (born May 4, 1982) (Arabic: نواف محمد العتيبي) is a Kuwaiti footballer.

== International goals ==
Scores and results list Kuwait's goal tally first.

#	Date	Venue	Opponent	Score	Result	Competition
1.	9 November 2006	Khalifa bin Zayed Stadium, Al Ain, United Arab Emirates	Taiwan	5–0	10–0	Friendly
