= Iqbal al-Gharaballi =

Igbal (sometimes Eqbal) 'Abd al-Latif al-Gharaballi (born 1952) is a Kuwaiti novelist.

Al-Gharaballi possesses a bachelor's degree in computer science, and worked for a time as a computer programmer at Kuwait Airways; she has also worked for the Kuwaiti Transportation Company during her career. She has published a number of novels and a memoir, and her work has appeared in the magazines al-Nahda and al-Yaqza.
