= Mai Al-Nakib =

Author of Short stories

Mai Al-Nakib (born 1970) is a writer from Kuwait. She is author of The Hidden Light of Objects, a collection of linked short stories published by Bloomsbury in 2014. The collection won the Edinburgh International Book Festival's 2014 First Book Award, the first collection of short stories to win. Her short stories have appeared in Ninth Letter, The First Line and the anthology Novel of the World. Two of her stories received honorable mention in Glimmer Train competitions. The Hidden Light of Objects is her first collection of short stories.

== Biography ==
Al-Nakib was born in Kuwait in 1970 and spent the first six years of her life in London, Edinburgh, and St. Louis, Missouri. She attended the American School of Kuwait. She holds a PhD in English literature from Brown University and is currently an associate professor of postcolonial studies and comparative literature at Kuwait University. Al-Nakib's academic research focuses primarily on cultural politics in the Middle East. She has written articles on Ghassan Kanafani, Assia Djebar and Yasmine Zahran, among others. She has also examined the history and importance of the Palestinian community in Kuwait. Al-Nakib lives and works in Kuwait.

== The Hidden Light of Objects ==
The Hidden Light of Objects is composed of ten interlinked short stories; each story is preceded by a loosely related vignette. The stories deal with the capacity of everyday objects to trigger forgotten sensations and memories in the various characters and explore how this experience can affect the present and future. Erika Banerji has said that Al-Nakib has "compassion for an old, vanished world and [an] exceptional eye for the bruised landscape of the modern Middle East". All of the stories are connected to the Middle East in some way. While the stories engage familiar political events — the invasion of Kuwait by Iraq, the civil war in Lebanon, the situation in Palestine — the focus is on the everyday lives of ordinary people.

== An Unlasting Home ==
Al-Nakib's first novel An Unlasting Home centers around a philosophy professor at Kuwait University, Sara, who is accused of blasphemy, a crime which carries a potential death penalty. A work of historical fiction, the book retraces a family's past and present through a multitude of characters.
