= Battle of Al-Regeai =

Part of the Ikhwan Revolt (1928)

- Part of Ikhwan Revolt
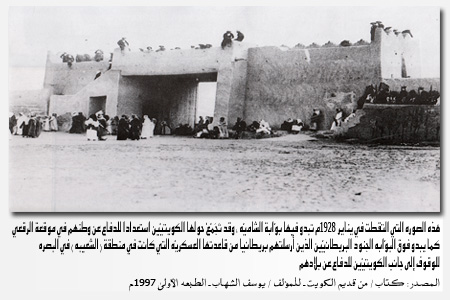
Date	28 January 1928
Location	Al Jahra, Kuwait
Result	Ikhwan victory: Kuwaiti and British retreat

Belligerents
Ikhwan	Sheikhdom of Kuwait; United Kingdom

Commanders and leaders
Faisal Al-Dawish; Ali ibn Ashwan al-Aouboui; Sheikh Falah Mazyad ibn Damkh Al-Hameli	Ahmad Al-Jaber Al-Sabah; Ali Salem Al-Mubarak Al-Sabah †; Sheikh Ali Khalifa Al-Abdullah II Al-Sabah (WIA); Abdullah Jaber Al-Abdullah II Al-Sabah †; Abdullah Al-Ahmad Al-Jaber Al-Sabah (POW)

Strength
500 horsemen and camel cavalry combatants	225 cavalry men including 25 vehicles with armed men

Casualties and losses
Unknown	Heavy (United Kingdom) 6 pilots killed

The Battle of Al-Regeai (Arabic: معركة الرقعي) also known as Battle of Atheriyat (named by the Ikhwan) in Kuwait was a fight between approximately 500 Ikhwan horsemen and the Kuwaiti military. It occurred on 28 January 1928. It was the final significant military engagement in Kuwait's early historical period. It transpired under the rule of Sheikh Ahmad Al-Jaber Al-Sabah, the 10th ruler of the Sheikhdom of Kuwait. The battle featured the first utilisation of vehicles in Kuwaiti combat. The Ikhwan raided Kuwaiti farmers at Umm Al-Ruweisat, northwest of Al Jahra. The Ikwhwan occupied many farms.

Battle General Commander of Defense and Security Forces, Sheikh Ali Salim Al-Mubarak Al-Sabah formed an army commanded by Sheikhs Ali Khalifa Al-Abdullah II Al-Sabah, Salman Al-Humoud Al-Sabah, Abdullah Jaber Al-Abdullah II Al-Sabah, Abdullah Ahmad Al-Jaber Al-Sabah, Sabah Al-Nasser and Ibrahim Abdullah Al-Muzayan. Vehicles and soldiers from Al Jahra and Kuwait City joined the battle contingent led by Sheikh Ali Al-Salem Al-Sabah.

== Battle ==
The assaulters were chased to Al-Batin Valley, west of Al-Jahra and were cut off there. Forces of the Al-Kout Fortress led by Sheikh Ali Al-Salem Al-Sabah inflicted heavy casualties on the assaulters, forcing them to retreat from the farming areas. During the battle, the cavalry charged and others battled out of their vehicles. As time passed, vehicles ran out of fuel and ammunition and were sinking in the sand. In the meantime, Sheikh Ali Khalifa Al-Abdullah II Al-Sabah was injured and remained in the valley.

Sheikh Abdullah Jaber Al-Abdullah II Al-Sabah, led the cavalry on a mission to locate and rescue Sheikh Ali Al-Salem Al-Sabah and his soldiers. To their disappointment, Sheikh Ali Al-Salem Al-Sabah's vehicle was found stuck and raided.

Following the demise of Sheikh Ali Al-Salem Al-Sabah, the Emir of Kuwait Sheikh Ahmad Al-Jaber Al-Sabah ordered that defence cavalry and infantry in Al-Jahra outside the defensive wall of Kuwait fall under the command of Sheikh Abdullah Jaber Al-Abdullah II Al-Sabah.

== See also ==
- Military of Kuwait
