= Geography of Kuwait =

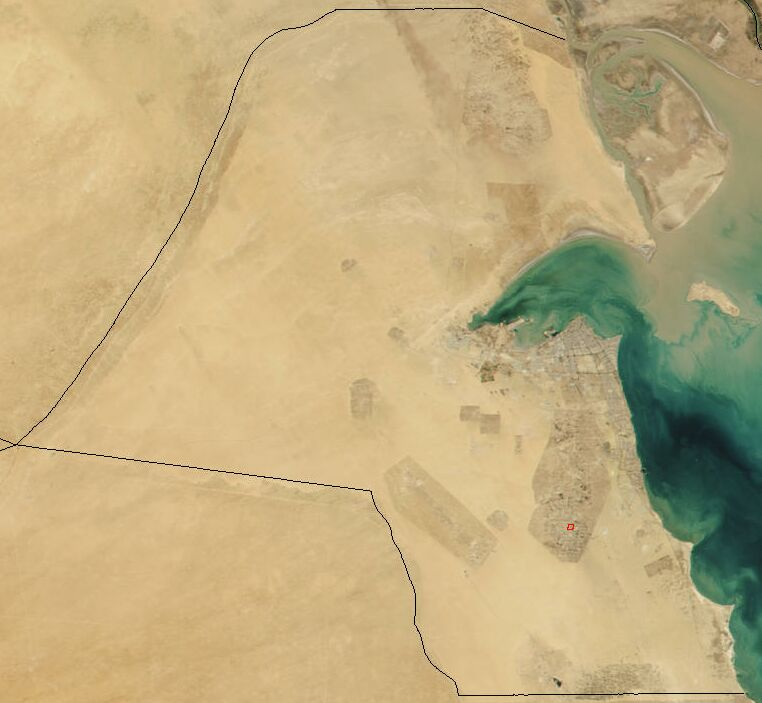
- Continent: Asia
- Region: West Asia
- Coordinates: 29°30′N 47°45′E
- Area: Ranked 152nd
  - Total: 17,820 km^{2} (6,880 sq mi)
  - Land: 100%
  - Water: 0%
- Coastline: 499 km (310 mi)
- Highest point: Kuwait high point (d); 306 m (1,004 ft)
- Lowest point: Persian Gulf; 0 m (0 ft)
- Longest river: No permanent rivers
- Largest lake: None
- Climate: Arid climate
- Natural resources: Petroleum, fish, shrimp, natural gas
- Natural hazards: Dust storms, sand storms, flash floods, thunderstorms
- Environmental issues: Air pollution, water pollution, desertification, limited natural fresh water
- Exclusive economic zone: 11,026 km^{2} (4,257 mi^{2})

Kuwait is a country in West Asia, bordering the Persian Gulf, between Iraq and Saudi Arabia. Kuwait is located at the far northwestern corner of the Persian Gulf. Kuwait is 17,820 square kilometres in size. At its most distant points, it is about 200 km (120 mi) north to south, and 170 km (110 mi) east to west. Kuwait has 10 islands. Kuwait's area consists mostly of desert.

== Boundaries and geographic features ==
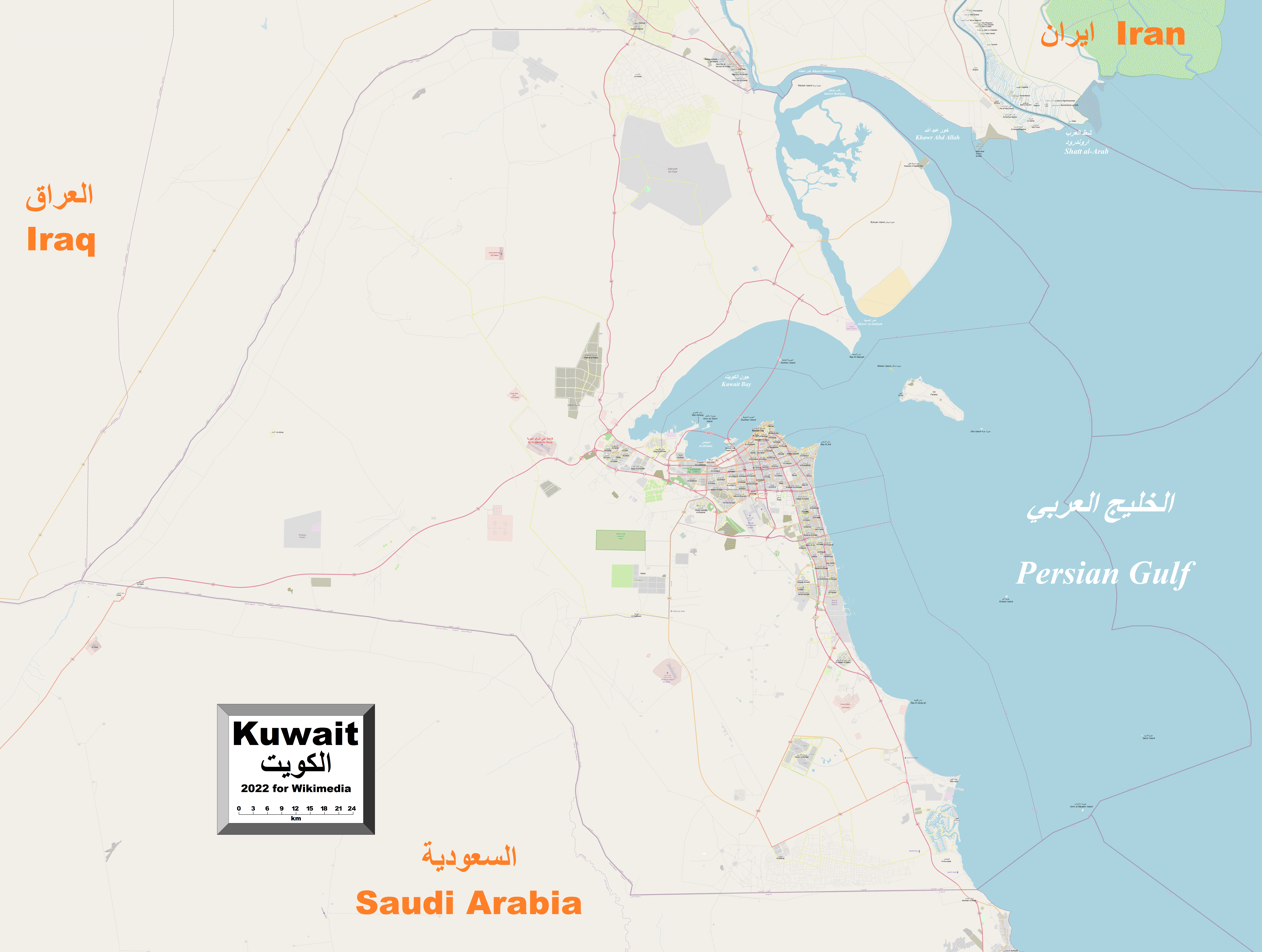
A detailed map of Kuwait.

As previously mentioned, Kuwait borders the Persian Gulf with 195 km (121 mi) of coast. Within its territory are ten islands, two of which, Bubiyan (the largest) and Warbah, are strategically important.

Kuwait's most prominent geographic feature is Kuwait Bay (Jun al Kuwayt), which indents the shoreline for about forty kilometers, providing natural protection for the port of Kuwait, and accounts for nearly one third of the country's shoreline.

To the north and northwest, there is the historically contested border between Kuwait and Iraq. Although the Iraqi government, which had first asserted a claim to rule Kuwait in 1938, recognized the borders with Kuwait in 1963 (based on agreements made earlier in the century), it continued to press Kuwait for control over Bubiyan and Warbah islands through the 1960s and 1970s.

To the south and southwest, Kuwait shares a 250-km border with Saudi Arabia. The boundary between Kuwait and Saudi Arabia was set by the Treaty of Al Uqayr in 1922, which also established the Saudi–Kuwaiti neutral zone of 5,700 square kilometers between the two nations. In 1966, Kuwait and Saudi Arabia agreed to divide the neutral zone; the partitioning agreement making each country responsible for administration in its portion was signed in December 1969. The resources in the area, now known as the Divided Zone, are not affected by the agreement. The oil from onshore and offshore fields continues to be shared equally between the two countries.

In August 1990, Iraq invaded Kuwait and, shortly thereafter, formally incorporated the entire country into Iraq. Under United Nations (UN) Security Council Resolution 687, after the restoration of Kuwaiti sovereignty in 1991, a UN commission undertook formal demarcation of the borders on the basis of those agreed to in 1963. The boundary was demarcated in 1992. Iraq initially refused to accept the commission's findings but ultimately accepted them in November 1994.

== Climate ==
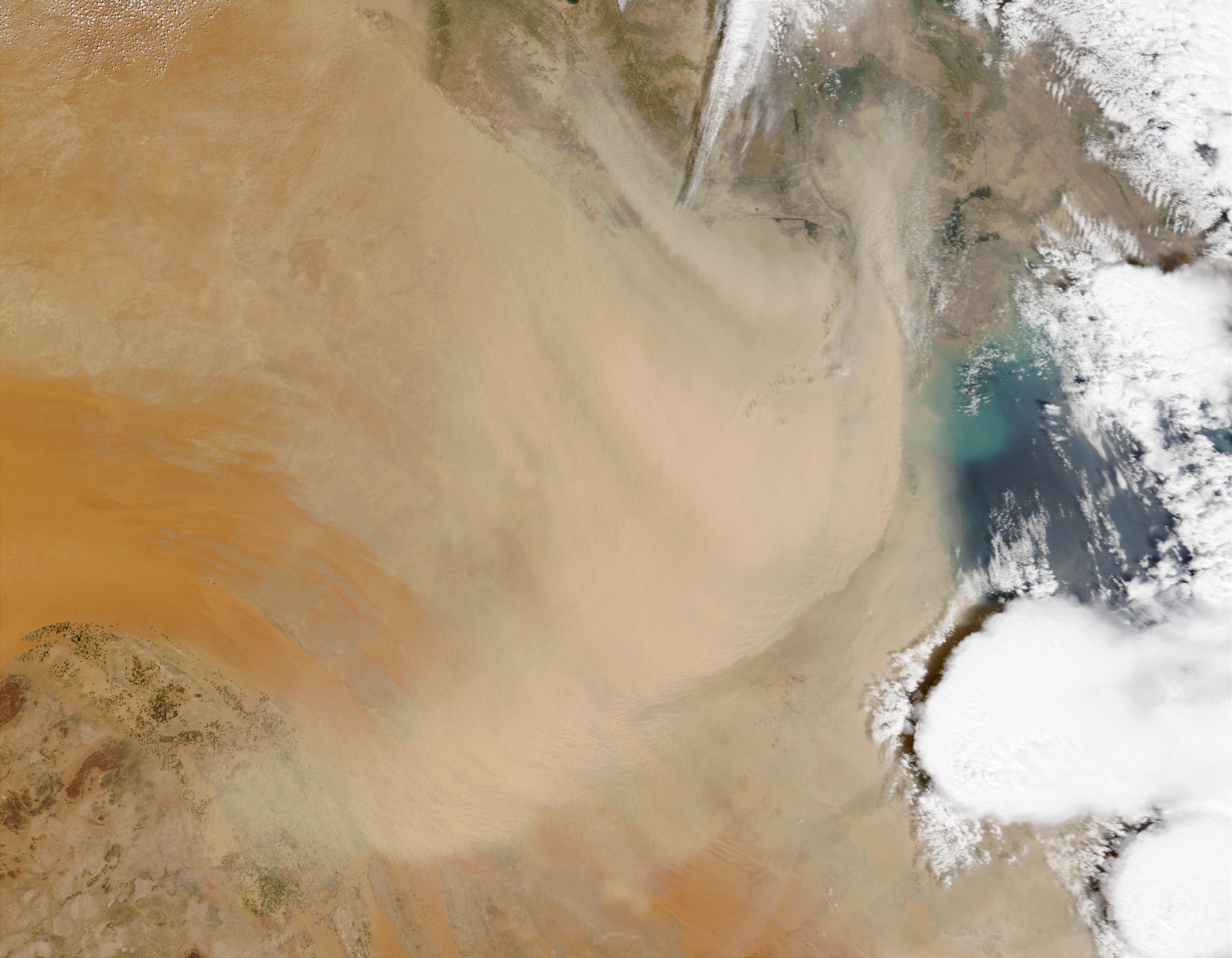
Dust storm over Kuwait and Southern Iraq, 16 April 2003

Kuwait has an arid climate. Rainfall in the nation varies from 75 to 150 millimeters (2.95 to 5.91 in) a year. Actual rainfall has ranged from 25 millimeters (0.98 in) a year to as much as 325 millimeters (12.8 in). In summer, average daily high temperatures range from 42 to 46 °C (108 to 115 °F); the highest ever temperature recorded in Kuwait was 54 °C (129 °F) at Mitribah on 21 July 2016 which is the highest recorded temperature in Asia and also the third highest in the world. The summers are relentlessly long, punctuated mainly by dramatic dust storms in June and July when northwesterly winds cover the cities in sand. In late summer, which is more humid, there are occasional sharp, brief thunderstorms.

By November summer is over, and colder winter weather sets in, dropping temperatures to as low as 3 °C (37 °F) at night; daytime temperatures are in the upper 20s °C (upper 70s to low 80s °F). Frost rarely occurs; rain is more common and falls mostly in the spring.

Kuwait's winter is colder than in other Persian Gulf countries, such as Bahrain, Qatar or United Arab Emirates. Kuwait experiences colder weather because it is situated farther north, and because of cold winds blowing from upper Iraq and Iran.

Climate data for Kuwait City
Month	Jan	Feb	Mar	Apr	May	Jun	Jul	Aug	Sep	Oct	Nov	Dec	Year
Record high °C (°F)	29.8 (85.6)	35.8 (96.4)	41.2 (106.2)	44.2 (111.6)	49.0 (120.2)	49.8 (121.6)	52.1 (125.8)	50.7 (123.3)	47.7 (117.9)	43.7 (110.7)	37.9 (100.2)	30.5 (86.9)	52.1 (125.8)
Mean daily maximum °C (°F)	19.5 (67.1)	21.8 (71.2)	26.9 (80.4)	33.9 (93.0)	40.9 (105.6)	45.5 (113.9)	46.7 (116.1)	46.9 (116.4)	43.7 (110.7)	36.6 (97.9)	27.8 (82.0)	21.9 (71.4)	34.3 (93.7)
Mean daily minimum °C (°F)	8.5 (47.3)	10.0 (50.0)	14.0 (57.2)	19.5 (67.1)	25.4 (77.7)	28.9 (84.0)	30.7 (87.3)	29.5 (85.1)	26.2 (79.2)	21.5 (70.7)	14.5 (58.1)	9.9 (49.8)	19.9 (67.8)
Record low °C (°F)	−4.0 (24.8)	−1.6 (29.1)	−0.1 (31.8)	6.9 (44.4)	14.7 (58.5)	20.4 (68.7)	22.4 (72.3)	21.7 (71.1)	16.0 (60.8)	9.4 (48.9)	2.0 (35.6)	−1.5 (29.3)	−4.0 (24.8)
Average rainfall mm (inches)	30.2 (1.19)	10.5 (0.41)	18.2 (0.72)	11.5 (0.45)	0.4 (0.02)	0.0 (0.0)	0.0 (0.0)	0.0 (0.0)	0.0 (0.0)	1.4 (0.06)	18.5 (0.73)	25.5 (1.00)	116.2 (4.57)
Average rainy days (≥ 0.1 mm)	5	3	3	1	0	0	0	0	0	1	3	3	19
Mean monthly sunshine hours	198.1	222.5	217.6	229.3	272.5	304.5	307.1	301.6	285.1	252.2	216.5	193.5	3,000.5
Mean daily sunshine hours	7.1	7.7	7.5	7.9	9.4	10.5	10.6	10.8	10.2	9.0	7.7	6.9	8.8
Percentage possible sunshine	68	69	63	62	69	77	76	78	77	79	72	67	72
Source: World Meteorological Organization (temperature and rainfall 1994–2008); NOAA (sunshine and records, 1961–1990); Wundergound (2012 records)

== Nature reserves ==
At present, there are five protected areas in Kuwait recognized by the IUCN. In response to Kuwait becoming the 169th signatory of the Ramsar Convention, Bubiyan Island's Mubarak al-Kabeer reserve was designated as the country's first Wetland of International Importance. The 50,948 ha reserve consists of small lagoons and shallow salt marshes and is important as a stop-over for migrating birds on two migration routes. The reserve is home to the world's largest breeding colony of crab-plover.

== Biodiversity ==
Currently, 444 species of birds have been recorded in Kuwait, 18 species of which breed in the country. Due to its location at the head of the Persian Gulf near the mouth of the Tigris–Euphrates river, Kuwait is situated at the crossroads of many major bird migration routes and between two and three million birds pass each year. Kuwait's marine and littoral ecosystems contain the bulk of the country's biodiversity heritage. The marshes in northern Kuwait and Jahra have become increasingly important as a refuge for passage migrants.

Twenty eight species of mammal are found in Kuwait; animals such as gerboa, desert rabbits and hedgehogs are common in the desert. Among the endangered mammalian species are the red fox and wild cat. Forty reptile species have been recorded although none are endemic to Kuwait.

Kuwait, Oman and Yemen are the only locations where the endangered smoothtooth blacktip shark is confirmed as occurring.

Kuwaiti islands are important breeding areas for four species of tern and the socotra cormorant. Kubbar Island has been recognised an Important Bird Area (IBA) by BirdLife International because it supports a breeding colony of white-cheeked terns.

== Geology and aquifers ==
The land was formed in a recent geologic era. In the south, limestone rises in a long, north-oriented dome that lies beneath the surface. It is within and below this formation that the principal oil fields, Kuwait's most important natural resource, are located. In the west and north, layers of sand, gravel, silt, and clay overlie the limestone to a depth of more than 210 meters. The upper portions of these beds are part of a mass of sediment deposited by a great wadi whose most recent channel was the Wadi al Batin, the broad shallow valley forming the western boundary of the country.

On the western side of the Al Rawdatayn geological formation, a freshwater aquifer was discovered in 1960 and became Kuwait's principal water source. The supply is insufficient to support extensive irrigation, but it is tapped to supplement the distilled water supply that fills most of the country's needs. The only other exploited aquifer lies in the permeable zone in the top of the limestone of the Ash Shuaybah field south and east of the city of Kuwait. Unlike water from the Al Rawdatayn aquifer, water from the Ash Shuaybah aquifer is brackish. Millions of liters a day of this water are pumped for commercial and household purposes.

== Water and marshes ==
Kuwait is the most water stressed country in the world.

Kuwait is part of the Tigris–Euphrates river system basin. Several Tigris–Euphrates confluences form parts of the Kuwait–Iraq border. Bubiyan Island is part of the Shatt al-Arab delta. Kuwait is partially part of the Mesopotamian Marshes. Kuwait does not currently have any permanent rivers within its territory. However, Kuwait does have several wadis, the most notable of which is Wadi al-Batin which forms the border between Kuwait and Iraq. Kuwait also has several river-like marine channels around Bubiyan Island, most notably Khawr Abd Allah which is now an estuary, but once was the point where the Shatt al-Arab emptied into the Persian Gulf. Khawr Abd Allah is located in southern Iraq and northern Kuwait, the Iraq-Kuwait border divides the lower portion of the estuary, but adjacent to the port of Umm Qasr the estuary becomes wholly Iraqi. It forms the northeast coastline of Bubiyan Island and the north coastline of Warbah Island.

Kuwait relies on water desalination as a primary source of fresh water for drinking and domestic purposes. There are currently more than six desalination plants. Kuwait was the first country in the world to use desalination to supply water for large-scale domestic use. The history of desalination in Kuwait dates back to 1951 when the first distillation plant was commissioned.

Kuwait's fresh water resources are limited to groundwater, desalinated seawater, and treated wastewater effluents. There are three major municipal wastewater treatment plants. Most water demand is currently satisfied through seawater desalination plants. Sewage disposal is handled by a national sewage network that covers 98% of facilities in the country.

== Human geography ==
The bulk of the Kuwaiti population lives in the coastal capital of the city of Kuwait. Smaller populations inhabit the nearby city of Al Jahrah, smaller desert and coastal towns, and, prior to the Persian Gulf War, some of the several nearby gulf islands, notably Faylakah.

== Area boundaries ==
Area
- Total: 17,818 km²
- Land: 17,818 km²
- Water: 0 km²
Area—comparative
Slightly smaller than Fiji
Land boundaries
- Total: 475 km
- Border countries: Iraq 254 km, Saudi Arabia 221 km
Coastline
499 km
Maritime claims
Exclusive Economic Zone
11,026 km^{2} (4,257 mi^{2})
- Territorial sea: 12 nmi (22.2 km; 13.8 mi)
Elevation extremes
- Lowest point: Persian Gulf 0 m
- Highest prominence: Mutla Ridge 142 m
- Highest point: unnamed site without prominence in the Jahra Governorate at 29°6′2″N 46°38′27″E 291 m

== Resources and land use ==
Natural resources
Petroleum, fish, shrimp, natural gas
Land use
- Arable land: 0.6%
- Permanent crops: 0.3%
- Permanent pasture: 7.6%
- Forest: 0.4%
- Other: 91.1% (2011)
Irrigated land
86 km² (2007)
Total renewable water resources
0.02 km^{3} (2011)
Freshwater withdrawal (domestic/industrial/agricultural)
- Total: 0.91 km^{3}/yr (47%/2%/51%)
- Per capita: 441.2 m^{3}/yr (2005)

== Environmental concerns ==
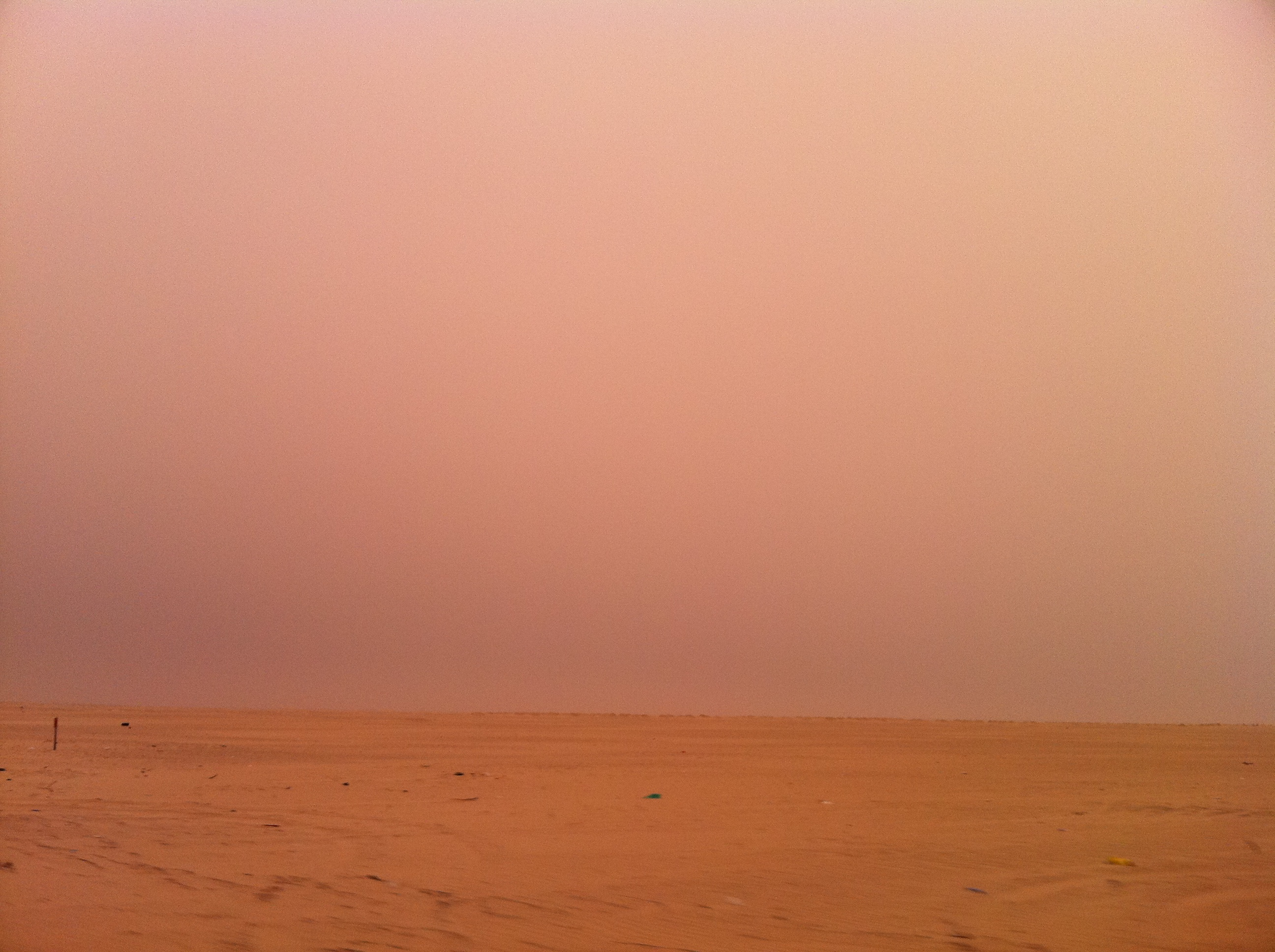
The Kuwaiti desert during a sandstorm.

Natural hazards
Sudden cloudbursts are common from October to April – they bring heavy rain which can damage roads and houses; sandstorms and dust storms occur throughout the year, but are most common between March and August
Environment—current issues
Limited natural fresh water resources; some of world's largest and most sophisticated desalination facilities provide much of the water; air and water pollution; desertification
Environment—international agreements
- Party to: Biodiversity, Climate Change, Climate Change-Kyoto Protocol, Desertification, Endangered Species, Environmental Modification, Hazardous Wastes, Law of the Sea
