= United Nations Security Council Resolution 1490 =

UN Security Council Resolution 1490
- UNIKOM medal bar
- Date: 3 July 2003
- Meeting no.: 4,783
- Code: S/RES/1490 (Document)
- Subject: The situation between Iraq and Kuwait
- Voting summary: 15 voted for; None voted against; None abstained
- Result: Adopted

Security Council composition
- Permanent members: China; France; Russia; United Kingdom; United States
- Non-permanent members: Angola; Bulgaria; Chile; Cameroon; Germany; Guinea; Mexico; Pakistan; Spain; Syria

United Nations Security Council resolution 1490, adopted unanimously on 3 July 2003, after resolutions 687 (1991), 689 (1991), 806 (1993), 833 (1993) and 1483 (2003) on the situation between Iraq and Kuwait, the Council extended the mandate of the United Nations Iraq–Kuwait Observation Mission (UNIKOM) monitoring the mutual border for a final period until 6 October 2003.

The Security Council reaffirmed the commitment of all states to the sovereignty and territorial integrity of both Iraq and Kuwait. It recognised that the UNIKOM operation and demilitarised zone established in 1991 between the two states was no longer necessary to protect Kuwait from Iraqi actions.

Acting under Chapter VII of the United Nations Charter, the resolution extended UNIKOM's mandate for a final time and ended the demilitarised zone between the two countries. It instructed the Secretary-General Kofi Annan to negotiate the transfer of UNIKOM's non-removable property and assets that could not be disposed otherwise to Iraq and Kuwait.

== See also ==
- Gulf War
- Iraqi invasion of Kuwait
- Iraq–Kuwait border
- List of United Nations Security Council Resolutions 1401 to 1500 (2002–2003)
- Iraqi sovereignty during the Iraq War
