= List of wadis of Kuwait =

Kuwait is part of the Tigris–Euphrates river system basin. Several Tigris–Euphrates confluences form parts of the Kuwait–Iraq border. Bubiyan Island is part of the Shatt al-Arab delta. Kuwait is partially part of the Mesopotamian Marshes. Kuwait does not currently have any permanent rivers within its territory. However, Kuwait does have several wadis, the most notable of which is Wadi al-Batin which forms the border between Kuwait and Iraq. Kuwait also has several river-like marine channels around Bubiyan Island, most notably Khawr Abd Allah which is now an estuary, but once was the point where the Shatt al-Arab emptied into the Persian Gulf. Khawr Abd Allah is located in southern Iraq and northern Kuwait, the Iraq-Kuwait border divides the lower portion of the estuary, but adjacent to the port of Umm Qasr the estuary becomes wholly Iraqi. It forms the northeast coastline of Bubiyan Island and the north coastline of Warbah Island.

== Wadis ==
- Bahrat al Abraq
- Bahrat al Mirfi
- Shaib Rujm al Jahtan
- Wadi al Batin (Kuwait River)

== Marine Channels of Bubiyan Island ==
- Khawr abd Allah
  - Khawr Bubiyan
  - Khawr az Zubayr
- Khawr as Subiyah
  - Khawr al Tha'aleb
