= United Nations Security Council Resolution 833 =

UN Security Council Resolution 833
- Iraq (green) and Kuwait (orange)
- Date: 27 May 1993
- Meeting no.: 3,224
- Code: S/RES/833 (Document)
- Subject: Iraq–Kuwait
- Voting summary: 15 voted for; None voted against; None abstained
- Result: Adopted

Security Council composition
- Permanent members: China; France; Russia; United Kingdom; United States
- Non-permanent members: Brazil; Cape Verde; Djibouti; Hungary; Japan; Morocco; New Zealand; Pakistan; Spain; Venezuela

United Nations Security Council resolution 833, adopted unanimously on 27 May 1993, after recalling resolutions 687 (1991), 689 (1991), 773 (1992) and 806 (1993) in addition to a report by the Secretary-General Boutros Boutros-Ghali, the council noted the continuing work of the United Nations Iraq-Kuwait Boundary Demarcation Commission.

The resolution recalled that the United Nations Iraq–Kuwait Boundary Demarcation Commission was not to reallocate territory, but for the first time mark the precise coordinates of the border between Kuwait and Iraq on the basis of the agreement between the two countries in 1963. Iraq was reminded of its obligations under Resolution 687 which formed the basis of the ceasefire. The council also welcomed the secretary-general's decision requiring the United Nations Iraq–Kuwait Observation Mission (UNIKOM) to finalise the boundary of the demilitarised zone demarcated by the commission.

Acting under Chapter VII of the United Nations Charter, the security council welcomed and appreciated the work of the Boundary Demarcation Commission on its completion. It also reaffirmed that the decisions of the commission on the boundary were final and demanded that Iraq and Kuwait respect the inviolability of international borders.

== See also ==
- Gulf War
- Invasion of Kuwait
- Kuwait–Iraq barrier
- List of United Nations Security Council Resolutions 801 to 900 (1993–1994)
