= United Nations Security Council Resolution 806 =

UN Security Council Resolution 806
- Iraq–Kuwait barrier
- Date: 5 February 1993
- Meeting no.: 3,171
- Code: S/RES/806 (Document)
- Subject: Iraq–Kuwait
- Voting summary: 15 voted for; None voted against; None abstained
- Result: Adopted

Security Council composition
- Permanent members: China; France; Russia; United Kingdom; United States
- Non-permanent members: Brazil; Cape Verde; Djibouti; Hungary; Japan; Morocco; New Zealand; Pakistan; Spain; Venezuela

United Nations Security Council resolution 806, adopted unanimously on 5 February 1993, after recalling resolutions 687 (1991), 689 (1991) and 773 (1992) in addition to a report by the Secretary-General Boutros Boutros-Ghali, the council, acting under Chapter VII of the United Nations Charter, guaranteed the inviolability of the international boundary between Iraq and Kuwait measures taken to enforce it, in the aftermath of Iraqi incursions into the demilitarised zone in January 1993.

The resolution then requested the secretary-general to plan for a strengthening of the United Nations Iraq–Kuwait Observation Mission (UNIKOM) and execute a phased deployment of personnel. Under this provision, UNIKOM would be converted into an armed force, with a 908-member Bengali infantry battalion supplementing the observer group. At the same time, it granted UNIKOM the power to prevent violations in the demilitarised zone.

The Council concluded by reaffirming that the next review of developments relating to UNIKOM would take place in April 1993.

== See also ==
- Gulf War
- Invasion of Kuwait
- Kuwait–Iraq barrier
- List of United Nations Security Council Resolutions 801 to 900 (1993–1994)
