= Mutla Ridge =

Most prominent landform in Kuwait

Coordinates: 29°23′N 47°38′E

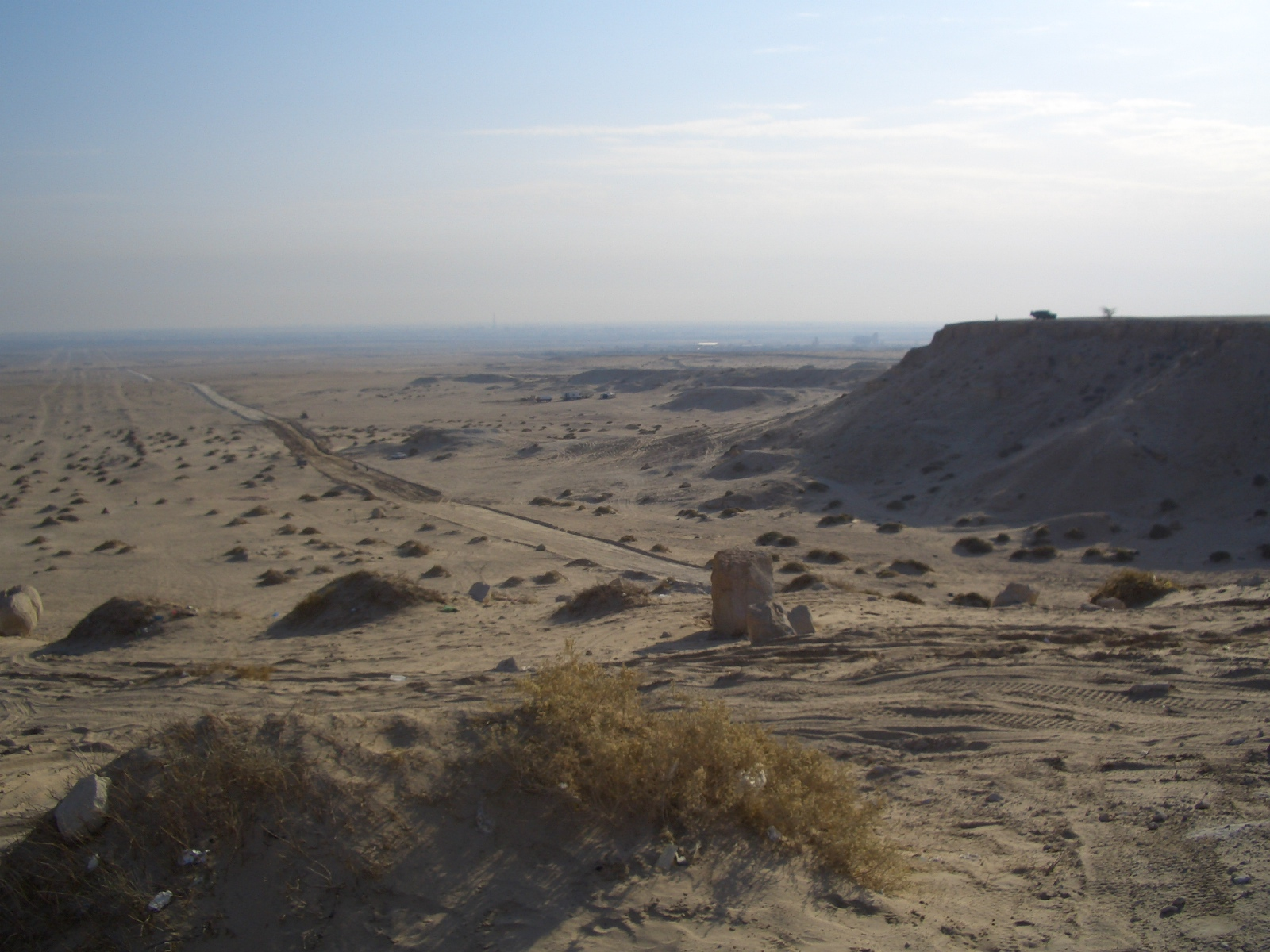
The view from Mutla Ridge

Mutla Ridge is the most prominent hill in Kuwait. Located in the Jahra Governorate, the ridge's highest point is 138 metres (453 ft) or 140 metres (460 ft) above sea level. It is not the highest point in the country, though; that is an unnamed point in far western Kuwait with no topographic prominence.

== History ==
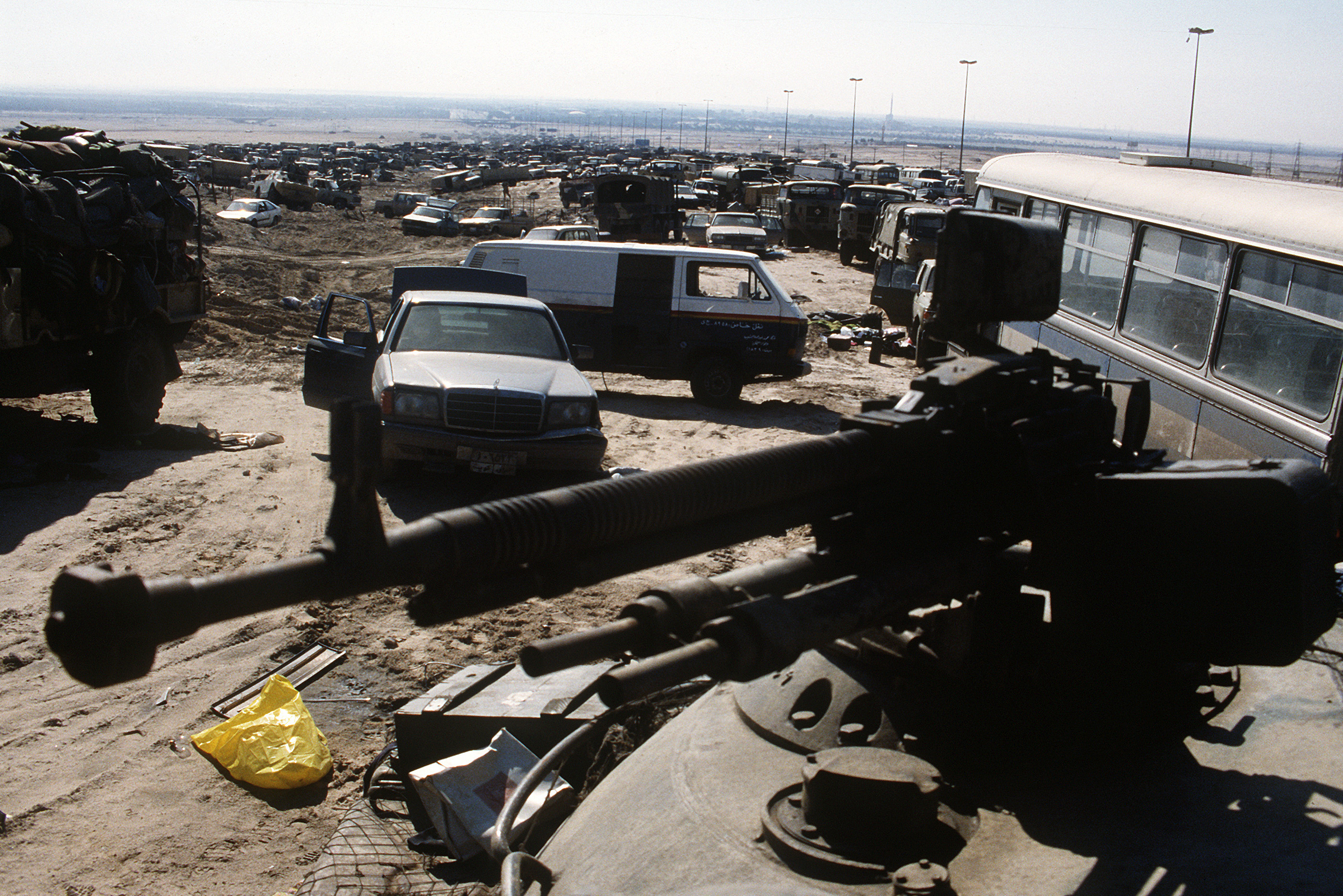
Abandoned vehicles clog the Basra-Kuwait highway out of Kuwait City after the retreat of Iraqi forces, 1991

In June 1961, having an agreement to defend Kuwait, Britain launched Operation Vantage in response to threats by Iraqi leader Abdul-Karim Qasim to annex his neighbor. A naval task force was sent, and plans were made to send marines to Mutla Ridge, but were canceled out of concern that Kuwaiti soldiers already stationed there would fire upon them by mistake. As it turned out, Qasim did not follow through on his threat.

In the 1991 Gulf War, an American-led coalition began the liberation of Kuwait from its Iraqi occupiers.

On 26 February, Marines and the Tiger Brigade attacked Mutla Ridge, first clearing a minefield. In a three-hour battle, they overcame Iraqi bunkers and dug-in tanks, mostly T-54/T-55s, destroying 20 tanks. When the Tiger Brigade reached the crossroads on Mutla Ridge, it encountered 18 Iraqi tanks and destroyed 3 before the rest surrendered.

On the night of 26–27 February, Iraqi soldiers fled Kuwait City in a convoy of military and stolen civilian vehicles on Highway 80 (subsequently nicknamed the "Highway of Death") toward Basra. American jets targeted and immobilized the front and end of the column, creating a gigantic, mile-long traffic jam near Mutla Ridge. The trapped Iraqis either abandoned their vehicles and fled on foot or were killed.
