= United Nations Iraq–Kuwait Observation Mission =

United Nation operation

The United Nations Iraq–Kuwait Observation Mission (UNIKOM) was established on April 9, 1991 following the Gulf War by Security Council Resolution 689 (1991) and fully deployed by early May 1991.

The task of joint military observers was to monitor the demilitarized zone (DMZ) along the Iraq-Kuwait border and the Khawr 'Abd Allah waterway, deter border violations and report any hostile action. On February 5, 1993, under Security Council Resolution 806, the mandate was extended to include physical action to prevent violations and the force was expanded to an intended three mechanized infantry battalions plus support.

The mandate of UNIKOM was completed on October 6, 2003.

The force's headquarters were in Umm Qasr, Iraq, within the DMZ. The maximum strength of the force was 1,187 on February 28, 1995. The Security Council extended its mandate for a final time in July 2003. The mission ended on September 30, 2003. There were over 135 military observers and civilian staff at the time, mainly protecting the border checkpoints. Ultimately, a new conflict, the War in Iraq, would dissolve the "peacekeeping" mission. Swarms of military equipment would gather in Kuwait and cross into Iraq's borders during the 2003 invasion of Iraq. During the mission, there were 18 fatalities.

Contributors are Argentina, Austria, Bangladesh (including the mechanized infantry battalion), Canada, Chile, China, Denmark, Fiji, Finland, France, Germany, Ghana, Greece, Hungary, India, Indonesia, Ireland, Italy, Kenya, Malaysia, Nepal, Nigeria, Norway, Pakistan, Philippines, Poland, Romania, Russian Federation (Soviet Union before December 24, 1991), Senegal, Singapore, Sweden, Switzerland, Tanzania, Thailand, Turkey, United Kingdom, United States, Uruguay and Venezuela In addition, during the setting-up phase (April–October 1991), UNIKOM included a Canadian combat engineer regiment (1 CER), a Security Battalion consisting of a multinational Bn Staff (SWE-FIN-NOR) and five infantry companies, drawn from UNFICYP and UNIFIL. Those troops were provided by Austria, Denmark, Fiji, Ghana, Nepal, and United States. There was also a maintenance/repair & recovery unit from Norway and a HQ logistic company from Sweden drawn from UNIFIL.

== See also ==
- Iraq–Kuwait border
