= United Nations Security Council Resolution 773 =

UN Security Council Resolution 773
- Iraq–Kuwait barrier
- Date: 26 August 1992
- Meeting no.: 3,108
- Code: S/RES/773 (Document)
- Subject: Iraq–Kuwait
- Voting summary: 14 voted for; None voted against; 1 abstained
- Result: Adopted

Security Council composition
- Permanent members: China; France; Russia; United Kingdom; United States
- Non-permanent members: Austria; Belgium; Cape Verde; Ecuador; Hungary; India; Japan; Morocco; Venezuela; Zimbabwe

United Nations Security Council resolution 773, adopted on 26 August 1992, after recalling resolutions 687 (1991) and 689 (1991), the Council considered the work of the Iraq–Kuwait Boundary Demarcation Commission established on 2 May 1991, and reiterated its position that it would enforce any violation of the ceasefire in the demilitarised zone.

The council stressed that the commission was not to reallocate territory on the border, but for the first time is demarcating the boundary set out in the "Agreed Minutes between the State of Kuwait and the Republic of Iraq regarding the restoration of Friendly Relations, Recognition and Related Matters" signed on 4 October 1963 by Iraq and Kuwait. It also welcomed the decision of the commission to consider the eastern section of the boundary at its next session and urged for it to be demarcated as soon as possible. The commission completed its work in November 1992.

The resolution was adopted by 14 votes to none, while Ecuador abstained.

== See also ==
- Gulf War
- Invasion of Kuwait
- Kuwait–Iraq barrier
- List of United Nations Security Council Resolutions 701 to 800 (1991–1993)
