= Khawr Abd Allah =

Estuary between Iraq and Kuwait

Khor Abdullah
- خور عبد الله
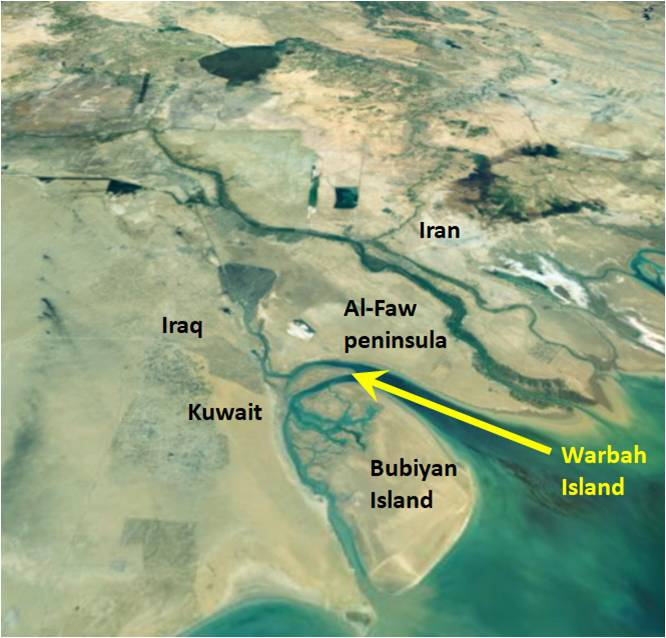
- The Khor Abdullah refers to the waters surrounding Warbah Island

- Location within Iraq
- Location: Northwest Persian Gulf (between southern Iraq and northern Kuwait)
- Group: Estuary
- Coordinates: 29°59′00″N 48°12′36″E
- Type: Estuary
- Primary inflows: Shatt al-Arab
- Primary outflows: Persian Gulf
- Max. width: 17 km (11 mi)
- Surface area: 40 km^{2} (15 sq mi)
- Average depth: 7–14 m (23–46 ft)
- Max. temperature: 46 °F (8 °C)
- Min. temperature: 0 °F (−18 °C)
- Islands: Bubiyan Island, Warbah Island

Khawr Abd Allah or Khor Abdullah (Arabic: خور عبد الله, romanized: khawr ‘abdullāh) is a narrow waterway located in the northern Persian Gulf, between the Kuwaiti islands of Bubiyan and Warbah to the west and Al-Faw Peninsula of Iraq to the east. It forms part of the maritime boundary between Kuwait and Iraq, serving as a key navigational channel for access to the ports of both countries. In 2010, the Iraqi government laid the foundation stone for the construction of the Grand Faw Port on the Iraqi side.

== Geography ==
Khor Abdullah connects the northern Persian Gulf with Khor al-Zubair Channel, which extends inland toward the Iraqi ports of Umm Qasr and Khor Al Zubair. On the Kuwaiti side, the waterway lies adjacent to Bubiyan and Warbah islands. Its strategic location makes it a vital passage for shipping, naval operations, and trade in the region.

== History ==
- Ottoman and British era: The waterway was noted in British and Ottoman cartographic surveys of the 18th and 19th centuries, often marked as "Khor Abdullah."
- 20th century: Following the collapse of both the Ottoman Empire and subsequent British influence in the Gulf, the waterway became a contested boundary area between Kuwait and Iraq.
- Post-1991: After the Gulf War, the United Nations Security Council Resolution (UNSC) 833 (1993) formally demarcated the maritime boundary between Iraq and Kuwait through Khor Abdullah.

== Borders ==
According to UNSC Resolution 833, Khor Abdullah is divided between the Republic of Iraq and the State of Kuwait, and the border of the Khor between them is the median line. The Khor is a possible sea outlet for the two countries to various parts of their respective territories, and sea navigation is available to them.

== Dispute ==
Maritime arrangements concerning the Khawr Abd Allah waterway are based on international law including the 1982 United Nations Convention on the Law of the Sea and subsequent bilateral agreements between Iraq and Kuwait. Following cooperation initiatives in the early 2010s and a navigation agreement regulating the channel ratified in 2012, disputes resurfaced in 2023 when Baghdad unilaterally deposited revised maritime coordinates and a new boundary map with the United Nations after Iraq's Federal Supreme Court annulled the agreement on procedural grounds.

Tensions escalated again in early 2026 after Iraq submitted new maritime maps and coordinates to the United Nations; Kuwait and several Arab states, including Saudi Arabia, Bahrain, the United Arab Emirates, Oman, Qatar, Jordan and Palestine, expressed support for Kuwaiti sovereignty and called for adherence to existing agreements and UN-recognized boundaries, while Iraq stated that its submissions reflected its sovereign maritime rights and economic interests in the waterway.

== See also ==
- Iraq–Kuwait border
- Grand Faw Port
- Khor Al Zubair
