= Jahra Governorate =

Governorate of Kuwait

Jahra Governorate محافظة الجهراء
- Governorate
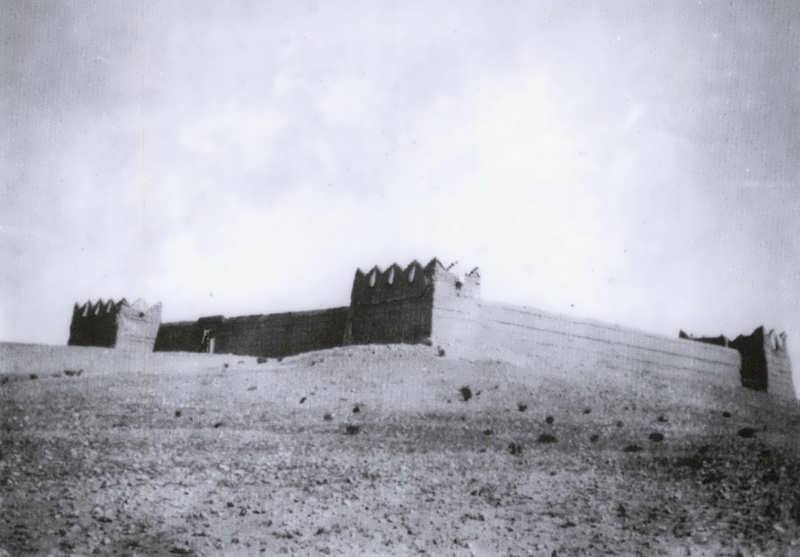
- Kuwait Red Fort in Jahra

- Map of Kuwait with Al-Jahra highlighted
- Coordinates (Al-Jahra): 29.337°N 47.658°E
- Country: Kuwait
- Established: 1979
- Areas: 28

Area
  - Total: 12,750 km^{2} (4,920 sq mi)

Population (2021)
  - Total: 566,861
  - Density: 44.46/km^{2} (115.2/sq mi)
- Time zone: UTC+03 (AST)
- ISO 3166 code: KW-JA

Jahra Governorate (Arabic: محافظة الجهراء Muḥāfaẓat al-Ǧahrāʾ) is one of the six governorates of Kuwait. It was established in 1979 as the fourth governorate of the country. The governorate covers an area of approximately 12,750 km^{2} (4,920 sq mi) and is the largest governorate by land area. It is subdivided into 28 areas. According to the 2021 census, it had a population of 566,861.

== Geography ==
Jahra Governorate is one of the six governorates of Kuwait. It was the fourth governorate to be established in 1989 after the Capital, Ahmadi, and Hawalli Governorates were established in 1962 when Kuwait was divided into governorates. The governorate occupies the northwestern part of the country and is bordered by the governorates of Asimah (Capital) and Farwaniya to the east, Ahmadi to the southeast. It shares land borders with Saudi Arabia to the south and Iraq to the west. It also includes the Bubiyan Island, the largest island in Kuwait, and Warbah Island. It occupies a land area of 12,750 km^{2} (4,920 sq mi), nearly two times the combined area of all the other governorates, and is the largest governorate by area. Most of the land area is covered by desert.

Red Palace (Red Fort) is located in Jahra. It was built in 1897 by Mubarak Al-Sabah and hosted the Battle of Jahra in 1920. It is sub-divided into 28 areas–West Jahra, Jahra, Qasr, Naeem, Taima, Naseem, South East Jahra, Jahra Industrial, Oyoun, Waha, Saad Al-Abdullah, Amghara, Junk Yard, Al-Qairawan, Al-Sulaibikhat Tombs, Al-Nahda, Sulaibiya, Sulaibiya Industrial 1, Sulaibiya Industrial 2, Sulaibiya Agricultural 1, Sulaibiya Agricultural 2, Kabd, Salmy, Al-Subiya, Al-Jahra Desert, Al-Abdali, Bubiyan, and Warbah.

== Demographics ==
According to the 2021 census, Jahra Governorate had a population of 566,861, comprising 320,834 males and 246,027 females. Despite being the largest by area, it is the third least populated governorate in Kuwait. About 430,419 were aged 15 and above, of which 213,768 were married, 174,630 had never married, 13,966 were divorced and 21,715 were widowed.

Kuwaiti citizens numbered 212,160, representing approximately 37.4% of the population, while non-Kuwaiti residents numbered 354,701, accounting for approximately 62.6%. The Kuwaiti population consisted of 103,272 males and 108,888 females, while the non-Kuwaiti population included 217,562 males and 137,139 females. Of the expatriate population, Gulf Cooperation Council countries constituted the largest grouping, with 280,648 people, followed by other Arab countries with 143,001 and other Asian countries with 135,221. The remaining population included 6,698 from sub-Saharan Africa, 530 from Europe, 458 from North America, 196 from South America, and 109 from Oceania.

== Economy ==
Jahra is the primary agricultural region in Kuwait, and most of the agriculture takes place around oases in Al Jahra. Jahra Governorate had 16,636 registered establishments, of which 16,467 were in the private sector. Agriculture, forestry and fishing accounted for the largest number of establishments, with 8,310, followed by 4,194 wholesale and retail trade establishments and 1,081 manufacturing industries. Of the population aged 15 years and above, 244,019 were employed. Manufacturing industries was the largest employer with 90,546 people, followed by transportation and storage with 35,288 and education with 23,535.
