= Fasht Al A'aij =

Fasht Al A'aij فشت العيج
- Interactive map of Fasht Al A'aij
- Coordinates: 29°45′0″N 48°30′0″E

Fasht Al A'aij is an area of land formed naturally above sea level located within Kuwait's territorial water near border of Iraq.
