= Umm Qasr =

Port city in Basra Governate, Iraq

Umm Qasr أم قصر Um-qasir, Um-qasser
- Umm Qasr Port in 2020.
- Etymology: Mother of a Palace
- Location within Iraq Location within Persian Gulf
- Coordinates: 30°02′03″N 47°55′46″E
- Country: Iraq
- Governorate: Basra
- District: Al-Zubair District
- Extant as village: 1903
- Port constructed: 1958
- Elevation: 9 m (30 ft)

Population (2003)
  - Total: 107,620
- Time zone: UTC+3 (GMT)
  - Summer (DST): UTC+4
- Postal code: 61011

Umm Qasr (Arabic: أم قصر, also transliterated as Um-qasir, Um-qasser, or Um Qasr) is a port city in southern Iraq. It stands on the canalised Khawr az-Zubayr, part of the Khawr Abd Allah estuary which leads to the Persian Gulf. It is separated from the border of Kuwait by a small inlet. A bridge across the waterway linked the port with Kuwait prior to the 1991 Persian Gulf War.

== History ==
=== Village to port ===
Umm Qasr was originally a small fishing town, but was used as a military port on several occasions before advancing trade and jobs by building a deep-water port on the coast. It was said to have been the site of Alexander the Great's landing in Mesopotamia in 325 BC. During the Second World War a temporary port was established there by the Allies to unload supplies to dispatch to the Soviet Union. It fell back into obscurity after the war, but the government of King Faisal II sought to establish a permanent port there in the 1950s.

After the Iraqi Revolution of 1958, a naval base was established at Umm Qasr. The port was subsequently founded in 1961 by the Iraqi ruler General Abdul-Karim Qassem. It was intended to serve as Iraq's only "deep water" port, reducing the country's dependence on the disputed Shatt al-Arab waterway that marks the border with Iran. The port facilities were built by a consortium of companies from West Germany, Sweden and Lebanon, with a railway line connecting it to Basra and Baghdad. The port opened for business in July 1967.

=== Iran–Iraq War ===
During the Iran–Iraq War (1980–1988) its importance increased as fighting restricted access to other ports further east. Umm Qasr was threatened after the Iranian invasion and occupation of the al-Faw Peninsula in 1986 but the port never fell.

=== Gulf War ===
Access to the port was part of the territorial dispute with Kuwait which led to the 1990 Persian Gulf War. Both countries contested ownership of the inlet leading to Umm Qasr as well as control of the nearby Kuwaiti islands of Bubiyan and Warbah. After the war, during which the port was bombed, control of the inlet was transferred to Kuwait and a large trench and sand berm were constructed along the border. The Iraqi government rejected the border changes and continued to claim Kuwaiti territory near the port. The Iraqi government shifted much commerce to Umm Qasr from Basra to punish the Basrawis economically for their support of the post-war rebellions against Saddam Hussein.

=== U.S.-led invasion ===
Umm Qasr was the target of one of the first major military operations in the 2003 invasion of Iraq, on March 21, 2003. The assault on the port was spearheaded by British Royal Marines, US Marines from the 15th Marine Expeditionary Unit and Polish GROM troops, but Iraqi forces put up unexpectedly strong resistance, requiring several days' fighting before the area was cleared of defenders. After the waterway was de-mined by Australian Clearance Diving Team Three, Helicopter Mine Countermeasures Squadron FOURTEEN Detachment ONE and Naval Special Clearance Team ONE of the U.S. Navy and Royal Navy Fleet Diving Unit 3 and reopened, Umm Qasr played an important role in the shipment of humanitarian supplies to Iraqi civilians.

During a debate in the House of Commons of the United Kingdom in late March 2003, British Defence Secretary Geoff Hoon somewhat inadvisedly compared Umm Qasr to the southern English city of Southampton. The analogy was met with scepticism among the troops. A British soldier was widely quoted as retorting, "There's no beer, no prostitutes and people are shooting at us. It's more like Portsmouth". In January 2006, the 100th British soldier died in Iraq. Corporal Gordon Pritchard, was killed in a bomb explosion in the town. An American Air Force enlistee, Derek Mohamed Adas, described his war-time experience at Camp Bucca and the poverty of the surrounding area in his interview with the Library of Congress' Veterans History Project in 2013.

On 18 December 2008, British Prime Minister Gordon Brown toured Umm Qasr Port by boat on the same trip on which he announced and signed an agreement ending British involvement in the Iraq War.

== Geography ==
=== Climate ===
In Umm Qasr, there is a hot desert climate. In winter there is more rainfall than in summer. The Köppen-Geiger climate classification is BWh. The average annual temperature in Umm Qasr is 25.0 °C (77.0 °F). About 133 mm (5.24 in) of precipitation falls annually.

Climate data for Umm Qasr
Month	Jan	Feb	Mar	Apr	May	Jun	Jul	Aug	Sep	Oct	Nov	Dec	Year
Mean daily maximum °C (°F)	18.0 (64.4)	22.2 (72.0)	29.1 (84.4)	33.5 (92.3)	41.0 (105.8)	46.2 (115.2)	47.4 (117.3)	47.1 (116.8)	43.5 (110.3)	35.4 (95.7)	26.4 (79.5)	19.5 (67.1)	34.1 (93.4)
Mean daily minimum °C (°F)	7.2 (45.0)	8.4 (47.1)	12.7 (54.9)	17.9 (64.2)	25.2 (77.4)	30.2 (86.4)	31.0 (87.8)	31.1 (88.0)	27.4 (81.3)	21.7 (71.1)	13.4 (56.1)	8.4 (47.1)	19.6 (67.2)
Average precipitation mm (inches)	25 (1.0)	16 (0.6)	16 (0.6)	17 (0.7)	4 (0.2)	0 (0)	0 (0)	0 (0)	0 (0)	3 (0.1)	23 (0.9)	29 (1.1)	133 (5.2)

== Today ==
=== Town ===
Population estimates are around 46,000 people living in Umm Qasr town at the outbreak of the 2003 war. Having grown from a tiny fishing village in 1958, the town is laid out in planned housing tracts, with workers living near the previously state-owned industries which employed them. Almost the entire population were relocated from other parts of Iraq to work in state-run industries. The port (and its workforce) were dramatically expanded following the first Gulf War, in part to remove vital functions from Basra, scene of a major anti-government uprising. A mapping project shortly thereafter stated "In total, the town is composed of 82 streets; each street has 72 houses. Up to three to four families live in each house." It then described three main neighborhoods:

- North Indian Camp (Hindi Court) in the north, with 6,600 people and 37 streets
- South Indian Camp to the west of town, mostly to house port workers.
- Port/Customs Office with housing and offices for the Iraqi Ministry of Industry; housing for workers in the pipe, steel, and cement factories.

==== Public services ====
Prior to the 2003 war, Umm Qasr had 13 primary schools (four for boys, four for girls, and five coeducational), two intermediate schools for boys, and five secondary schools (two for boys, one night school for boys, and two for girls). There was a single hospital for the town.

Today, the population of Umm Qasr communities is around 55,000 people. There are shortages in the higher education services in the city, and most of the students are traveling to Basra's one public university about 57 km, or to the Technical Institute in Al-Zubair region. However, the city has also had many of its people migrate to the European Union, Canada and Australia. The town has a multicultural community, and the borders with neighboring country Kuwait and sea borders has offered people more understanding of the port city's lifestyle.

==== Sports ====
Football is the most popular sport among the youth in Umm Qasr. There are many local teams, but the greatest public support is for the Port Culp team in the mother port of Maqel in downtown Basrah. Some of the youth are involved in swimming in the gulf water; also, some people are focusing on the running sports. Female participation in sports is limited in the public schools.

==== Rail line ====
A branch of the main Iraqi Republic Railways line connects Umm Qasr to Basra from Shouaiba Junction (near Basra) via the port of Khawr az-Zubayr.

==== Airport ====
Umm Qasr has a civil aviation airport, with the ICAO Code of ORUQ.

=== Buildings and structures ===
At Umm Qasr, there is a 492-meter-tall (1,614-foot) broadcasting mast at 30°3′34.37″N 47°53′14.52″E.

== See also ==
- Al-Faw
- List of places in Iraq
- List of United Kingdom Military installations used during Operation Telic
