= Taima =

Taima may refer to:

== Places ==
- Taima, Nara, a former town in Japan
  - Taima-dera, a temple in that town
- Taima-Taima, a Late Pleistocene archaeological site in Falcón, Venezuela
- Tayma, an oasis in Saudi Arabia

== People ==
- Taimah (1790–1830), 19th-century Sauk leader, also known as Chief Tama
- Narihito Taima (当麻 成人, born 1961), Japanese water polo player

== Other uses ==
- Taima (band), a Canadian musical duo and the album that they recorded, Taima
- Taima (whale), an orca from Sea World Orlando, Florida
- Taima, a duo consisting of Elisapie Isaac and Alain Auger
- Taima, an Augur hawk who is the live mascot of the Seattle Seahawks NFL team
- Taima, a Japanese word for cannabis
- Taima, a Japanese charm unrelated to cannabis
  - Jingū taima, a famous variant of that charm
