= Khor Al Zubair =

City in Basra, Iraq

Coordinates: 30°11′49″N 47°53′6″E

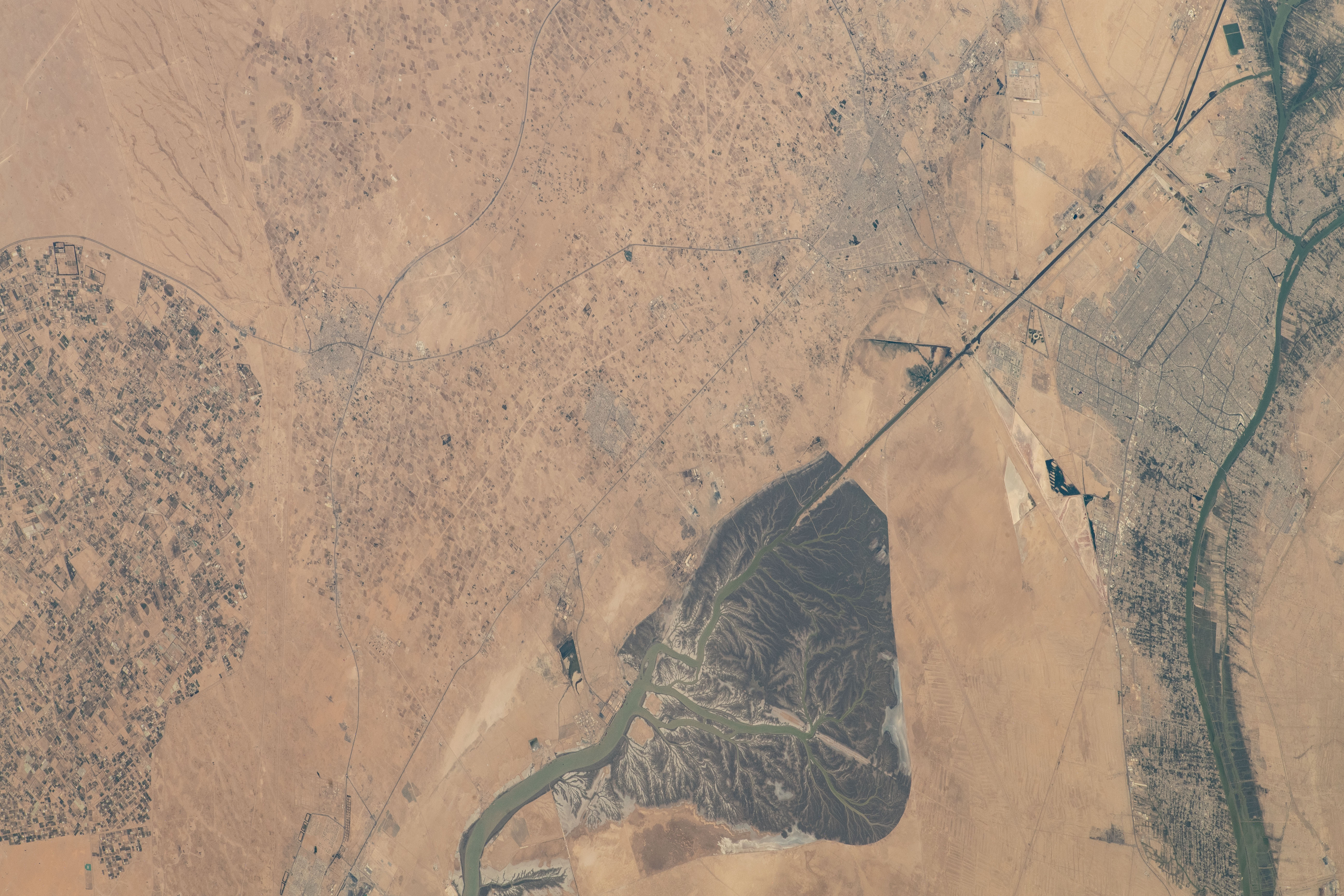
Khor Al Zubair Wetlands, town, port, Az Zubair, Basra, Shatt al-Arab, structures in the desert, chanel

Khor Al Zubair is a city in Basra, in Iraq. As well as the Khor Al Zubair Port, it is also has major industrial areas which are home to laboratories and companies that include petrochemical companies and fertilizer plants. In the south there are iron and steel plants, as well as those producing various liquids and gases.

The Khor Al Zubair channel is next to the city.
