= Demilitarized zone =

Area in which agreements between military powers forbid military activities

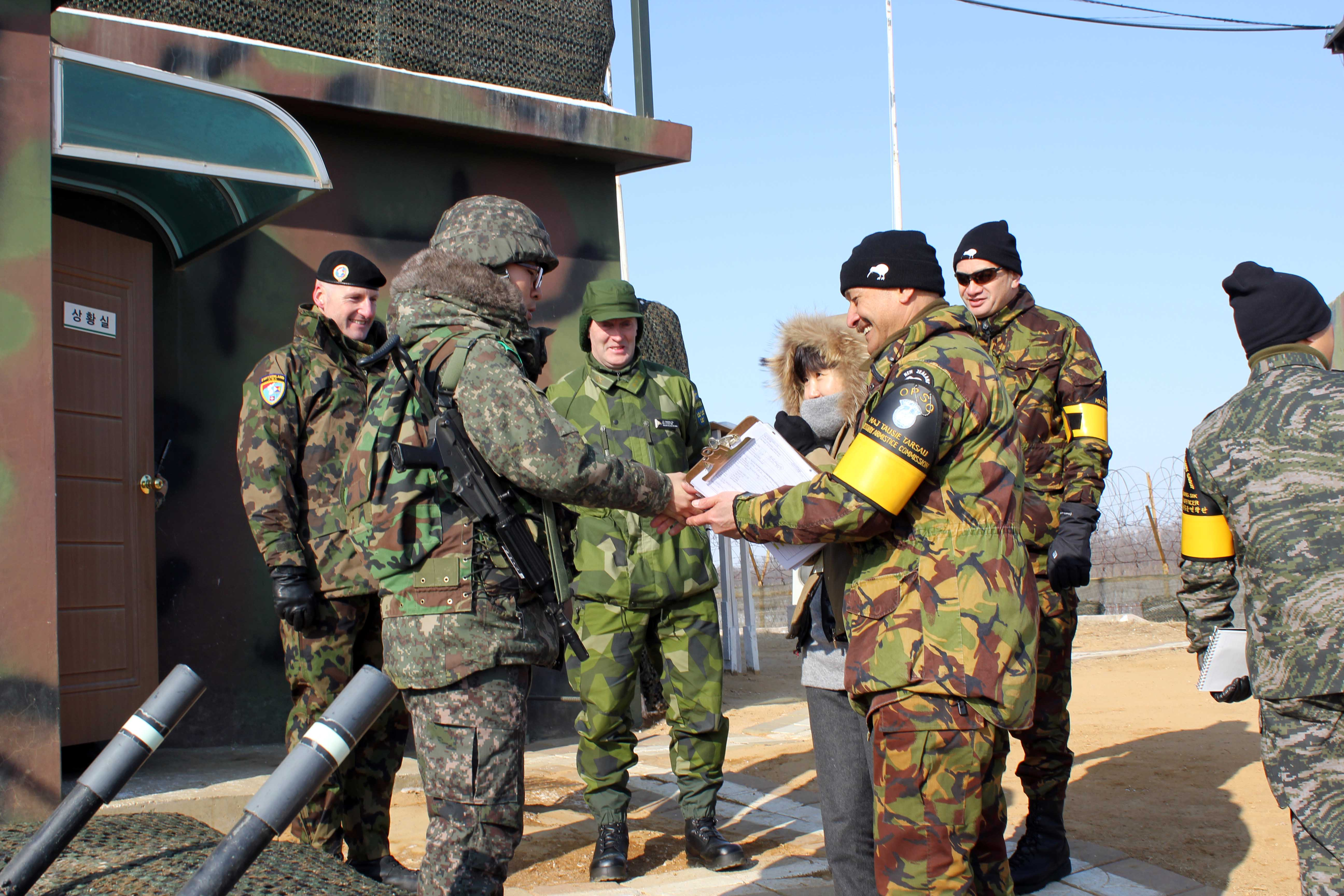
The mission of UNCMAC is to supervise the Military Armistice Agreement between the two Koreas along the 151 mile Demilitarized Zone (DMZ).

A demilitarized zone (DMZ or DZ) is an area in which treaties or agreements between states, military powers or contending groups forbid military installations, activities, or personnel. A DZ often lies along an established frontier or boundary between two or more military powers or alliances. A DZ may sometimes form a de facto international border, such as the Korean Demilitarized Zone. Other examples of demilitarized zones are a 14 km (8.7 mi) wide area between Iraq and Kuwait; Antarctica (preserved for scientific exploration and study); and outer space (space more than 100 km or 62 mi from the Earth's surface).

Some zones remain demilitarized after an agreement has awarded control to a state which (under the DZ terms) had originally ceded its right to maintain military forces in the disputed territory. It is also possible for powers to agree on the demilitarization of a zone without formally settling their respective territorial claims, enabling the dispute to be resolved by peaceful means such as diplomatic dialogue or an international court.

Several demilitarized zones have also unintentionally become wildlife preserves because their land is unsafe for construction or less exposed to human disturbances (including hunting). Examples include the Korean Demilitarized Zone, the Cypriot Demilitarized Zone (the Green Line), and the former Vietnamese Demilitarized Zone which divided Vietnam into two countries (North Vietnam and South Vietnam) from 21 July 1954 to 2 July 1976.

== Current demilitarized zones ==
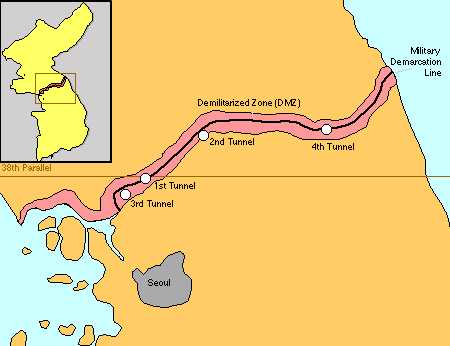
The Korean Demilitarized Zone incorporates territory on both sides of the ceasefire line as it existed at the end of the Korean War (1950–53).

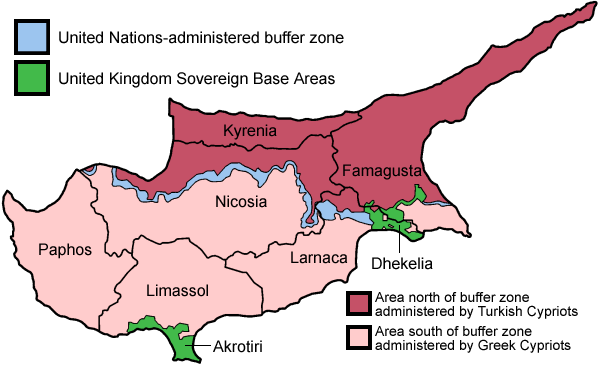
The UN Buffer Zone in Cyprus marks the southernmost points that the Turkish troops occupied during the Turkish invasion of Cyprus in August 1974.

- Aegean Islands: Several Turkish and Greek islands were designated as demilitarized zones following the Treaty of Lausanne and Treaty of Paris between Italy and the Allied Powers. While the demilitarization of Turkish islands (Imbros and Tenedos) were abolished after the Montreux Convention, the remaining islands' legal status has continued to be contested between Turkey and Greece. While the Greek government unilaterally installed military bases on most of the islands in question following Turkish invasion of Cyprus, the status of partial demilitarization has remained in some of the islands.
- Åland: The Åland Convention of 1921, which was concluded following a decision of the League of Nations in response to the Åland crisis, mandates that the Finnish government maintain the territory as a demilitarized area.
- Antarctica: The Antarctic Treaty forbids military activity in Antarctica, such as "the establishment of military bases and fortifications, the carrying out of military manoeuvres, as well as the testing of any type of weapon". The Treaty does however provide for the "use of military personnel or equipment for scientific research or for any other peaceful purpose".
- Joint Control Commission: Known locally as the Dniester Valley Security Zone, the demilitarized buffer zone was created by the cease-fire agreement ending the War of Transnistria. The Commission's peacekeeping mission monitors the demilitarized zone which roughly outlines the Dnister river between Moldova and Transnistria. It is 225 kilometers long and from 1 to 15 kilometers wide.
- Korean Demilitarized Zone – The Korean Armistice Agreement created a 4 km (2.5 mi)-wide demilitarized zone between North Korea and South Korea following the Korean War. It is currently one of the most heavily militarized areas in the world despite the name.
- Kuwait–Iraq barrier: The United Nations Security Council approved the creation of a demilitarized zone between Iraq and Kuwait in Resolution 689 after the Persian Gulf War. Although the demilitarized zone is no longer mandated by the council, it continues to exist.
- Martín García Island: An Argentine island surrounded by Uruguayan waters of the Río de la Plata, according to the 45th article of the Río de la Plata Treaty it states that "the Martín García Island will be destined exclusively as a natural reserve for the conservation and preservation of the native fauna and flora, under the jurisdiction of the Argentine Republic", stating a demilitarized zone in the island.
- Preah Vihear: The International Court of Justice had ordered the creation of a "provisional demilitarized zone" around the Temple whose ownership is claimed by both Cambodia and Thailand.
- Sinai Peninsula: The Egypt–Israel peace treaty sets a limit to the amount of forces Egypt can place in the Sinai Peninsula. Parts of the peninsula are demilitarized to various degrees, especially within 20–40 kilometres (12–25 miles) of Israel. Israel also agreed to limit its forces within 3 kilometres (1.9 miles) of the Egyptian border. The areas are monitored by the Multinational Force and Observers. However, because of the Sinai insurgency all sides agreed and encouraged Egypt to send large amounts of military forces into the area, including tanks and helicopters, to fight the Islamist militant groups in the region.
- Sudan: A 10 km (6 mi) demilitarized zone along the Sudan – South Sudan border.
- United Nations Buffer Zone in Cyprus: The United Nations Security Council created a buffer zone separating the self-proclaimed, internationally unrecognized Turkish Republic of Northern Cyprus from the Republic of Cyprus. It was authorized by Resolution 186 and is patrolled by the United Nations Peacekeeping Force in Cyprus.
- United Nations Disengagement Observer Force Zone: The United Nations Security Council approved the creation of a demilitarized zone in a portion of the Israeli-occupied territory of the Golan Heights in Syria in Resolution 350 after the Yom Kippur War. The zone is monitored by the United Nations Disengagement Observer Force.

== Former demilitarized zones ==
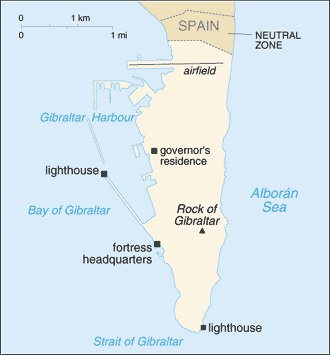
Historical map of the promontory of Gibraltar.

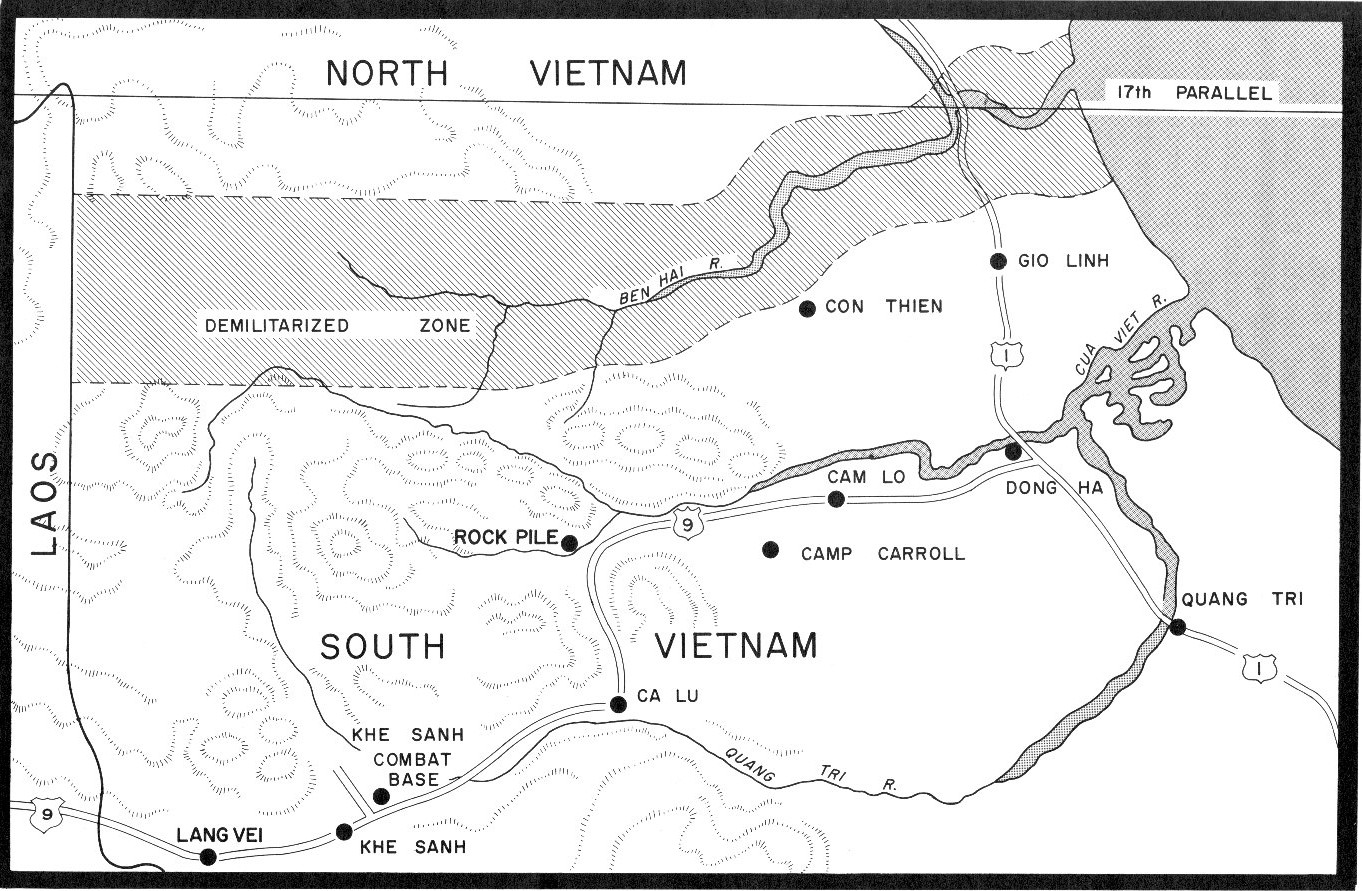
The Vietnamese Demilitarized Zone separating North and South Vietnam in 1969

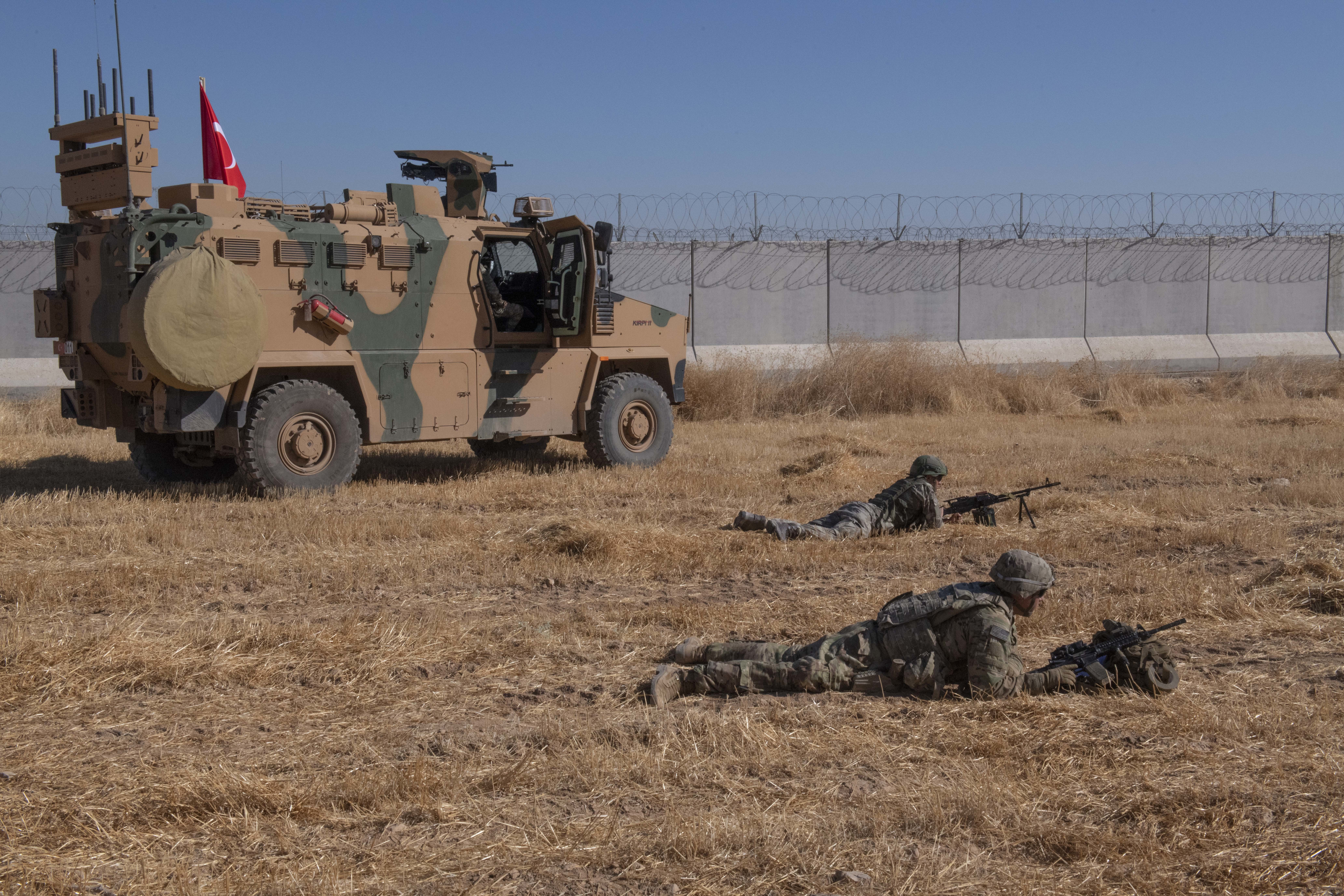
Turkish and American soldiers provide security for a joint ground patrol in the Northern Syria Buffer Zone, 24 September 2019

- El Caguán DMZ – A demilitarized zone was established in southern Colombia between 1999 and 2002, during the failed peace process that involved the Government of President Andrés Pastrana and the Revolutionary Armed Forces of Colombia (FARC).
- China – The Imperial Japanese Army conquered Manchuria between September 1931 and February 1932, when they proclaimed the region the state of Manchukuo. In May 1933, the Tanggu Truce between China and Japan was concluded, establishing a demilitarized zone between Manchukuo and China. In 1937 Japan violated this truce with an invasion of the remainder of China. In 1945, after the fall of the Japanese empire at the end of the Asia-Pacific theater of World War II, Manchuria was re-incorporated into China.
- Ecuador – a demilitarized zone was established on 2 October 1941, after the war between Ecuador and Peru, which existed under Ecuadorian administration and under the observation of neutral mediator nations: the United States, Brazil and Argentina. The DMZ was abolished in 1942, with the withdrawal of Peruvian forces from El Oro Province after the signing of the Rio Protocol.
- A neutral territory was established between the British Overseas Territory of Gibraltar and Spain after the end of the 1727 siege. A strip of land 600 toises (about 1.2 km or 3/4 mi) long, more than two cannon shots' distance between the British and Spanish guns, was called "the neutral ground" and shown as such on older maps. In 1908, the British built a fence in a portion claimed to be the British half of the neutral territory. Spain does not recognize British sovereignty over the isthmus (including the border), asserting it is Spanish soil. Although both the United Kingdom and Spain used to be part of the European Union (before the United Kingdom's exit), the border was a de facto international frontier with customs and immigration checks; Spain does not formally recognize it as a "frontier", referring to it as a "fence". Whatever its name, Gibraltar opted out of the European Union Customs Union and is not part of the Schengen Area; the border is open 24 hours a day, with customs duties payable on designated goods entering Spain or Gibraltar.
- Ground Safety Zone – A 5-kilometre-wide (3.1 mi) demilitarized area between FR Yugoslavia and Kosovo was created under the Kumanovo Agreement following the Kosovo War that existed between 1999 and 2001. Following the Insurgency in the Preševo Valley, Serbian forces were allowed to enter GSZ.
- Idlib demilitarization agreement zone – A 15 km (9 mi) demilitarized zone, created by agreement between Russian and Turkish government, splitting the last major stronghold of the Syrian rebels from the Syrian government controlled area amidst the Syrian Civil War.
- Israel and Egypt:
  - Following the 1948 Arab–Israeli War, a DMZ (the El Auja Zone) was created by the 1949 Armistice Agreements between Israel and Egypt.
- Israel and Jordan:
  - The Israeli enclave and Jordanian area on Mt. Scopus was designated as a DMZ.
  - The area around the Latrun salient.
- Israel and Syria: Following the 1948 Arab-Israeli War, three DMZs were created by the 1949 Armistice Agreements between Israel and Syria.
- Northern Syria Buffer Zone – A 115 km (71 mi) demilitarized zone in northern Syria straddling portions of the Syria–Turkey border. It was established between Turkey and the United States, both NATO allies, during the Syrian Civil War to prevent clashes between Kurdish and Turkish forces. The DMZ collapsed in October 2019, after Turkey dismissed the agreement and the United States ordered a withdrawal of US forces from northern Syria, allowing the 2019 Turkish offensive into north-eastern Syria to go ahead.
- Norway and Sweden established a demilitarized zone of 1 km (1,100 yards) on each side of their border after the dissolution of the union between Norway and Sweden in 1905. The zone was abolished by mutual agreement in 1993.
- Rhineland – The Treaty of Versailles designated the Rhineland as a demilitarized zone after World War I, prohibiting the Weimar Republic from deploying its military there. It was re-occupied and re-militarized in 1936 by Nazi Germany in violation of international treaties.
- Saudi–Iraqi neutral zone – The Uqair Protocol established a demilitarized zone between the Sultanate of Nejd and the Kingdom of Iraq, which at the time was a League of Nations mandate administered by the British Empire. Nejd was later incorporated into the Kingdom of Saudi Arabia. The zone was partitioned in 1981 but the treaty was not filed with the United Nations. The zone was finally officially abolished during the Persian Gulf War, when Iraq and Saudi Arabia cancelled all international agreements with each other.
- Saudi–Kuwaiti neutral zone – The Uqair Protocol established a neutral zone between the Sultanate of Nejd and the British protectorate of Kuwait in 1922. It was partitioned by mutual agreement in 1970.
- In the aftermath of World War I, a demilitarized zone encompassing the Turkish Straits and two Aegean islands (Imbros and Tenedos) was established by the Allied Powers in the Treaty of Sèvres. The zone was supervised by the International Straits Commission under the League of Nations system. The rules governing the demilitarized status was heavily modified by the Treaty of Lausanne in 1923. The zone was later abolished by the Montreux Convention in 1936.
- Vietnamese Demilitarized Zone – The demilitarized zone between North Vietnam and South Vietnam was established on 20 July 1954 as a result of the Geneva Peace Accords signed by the Viet Minh and France. The DMZ in Vietnam officially lay at the 17th parallel and ended after the Vietnam War on 30 April 1975; in reality, it extended about 2 km (1 mi) on either side of the Bến Hải River and west to east from the Lao border to the South China Sea.

== See also ==
- Buffer Zone
- Ceasefire
- Demilitarisation
- Demarcation line
- DMZ (computing)
- Green zone
- Humanitarian corridor
- List of established military terms
- No-fly zone
- Safe Zone (Syria)
- UNIKOM
- United Nations Safe Areas
