= Warbah Island =

Island

Coordinates: 30°0′N 48°04′E

Native name: جزيرة وربة
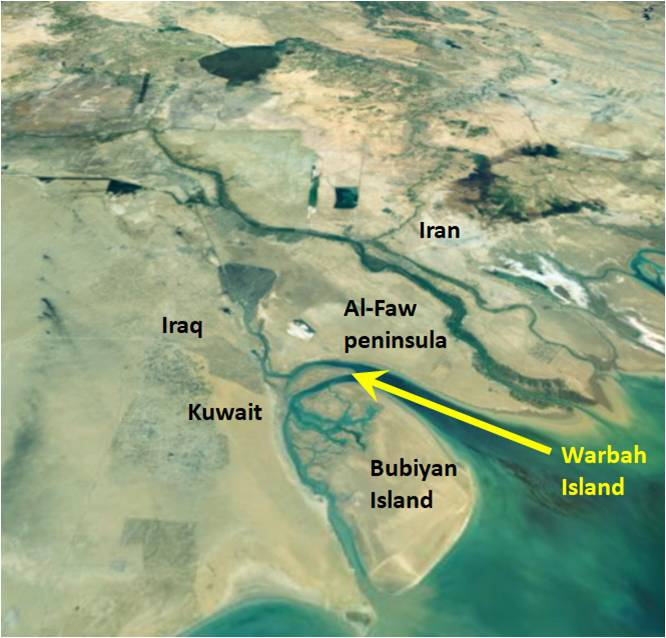

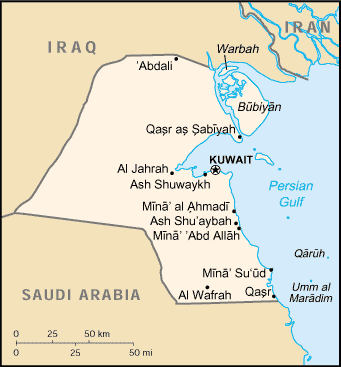
- Interactive map of Warbah Island

Geography
- Location: Persian Gulf
- Area: 37 km^{2} (14 sq mi)
- Length: 15 km (9.3 mi)
- Width: 5 km (3.1 mi)

Warbah Island (Arabic: جزيرة وربة) is an island belonging to Kuwait, located in the Persian Gulf, near the mouth of the Euphrates River.

== Geography ==
Warbah is located roughly 100 metres (110 yd) east of the Kuwaiti mainland, 1.5 kilometres (0.93 mi) north of Bubiyan Island, and 1 kilometre (0.62 mi) south of the Iraqi mainland. It is roughly 15 kilometres (9.3 mi) long and 5 kilometres (3.1 miles) wide, with an area of 37 square kilometres (14 square miles).

== History ==
In July 1913, a draft treaty was created by the Ottoman Empire and the United Kingdom in which Warbah Island was included in the territory of the Emirate of Kuwait. The treaty was not ratified due to the outbreak of World War I.

In 1951, Iraq offered to accept the 1951 border agreement on the condition that Warbah Island be given to them. Kuwait rejected this, and Iraq withdrew the offer in 1953. In 1956, the British proposed that Kuwait give up Warbah Island in exchange for water supply from Iraq, but Kuwait rejected this.

Iraq claimed the island in the 1970s and 1980s. In November 1994, Iraq formally accepted the UN-demarcated border with Kuwait which had been spelled out in Security Council Resolutions 687 (1991), 773 (1993), and 833 (1993) which formally ended Iraq's earlier claim to Warbah Island.

In December 2002, near the island, in the lead-up to the invasion of Iraq, an Iraqi ship opened fire on two Kuwaiti coastguard patrol boats, causing them to collide. A US serviceman and two Kuwaiti coastguards were injured in the attack. No mention was made of the reason for the US serviceman's presence on a Kuwaiti vessel.

The island has no permanent inhabitants. Kuwait maintains a coastguard post, named M-1 on the island which is partially funded by the United Nations.

== Works cited ==
- "United Nations: Letter from the Secretary-General Transmitting to the Security Council the Final Report on the Demarcation of the International Boundary Between Iraq and Kuwait". International Legal Materials. 32 (5). Cambridge University Press: 1425–1462. 1993. doi:10.2307/20693855. JSTOR 20693855.
- Hasan, S. (1995). "Britain and the Iraq-Kuwait Dispute". Proceedings of the Indian History Congress. 56. Indian History Congress: 881–888. doi:10.2307/44158750. JSTOR 44158750.
