= United Nations Security Council Resolution 689 =

UN Security Council Resolution 689
- Separation barrier between Iraq and Kuwait
- Date: 9 April 1991
- Meeting no.: 2,983
- Code: S/RES/689 (Document)
- Subject: Iraq–Kuwait
- Voting summary: 15 voted for; None voted against; None abstained
- Result: Adopted

Security Council composition
- Permanent members: China; France; Soviet Union; United Kingdom; United States
- Non-permanent members: Austria; Belgium; Côte d'Ivoire; Cuba; Ecuador; India; Romania; Yemen; Zaire; Zimbabwe

United Nations Security Council resolution 689, adopted unanimously on 9 April 1991, after recalling Resolution 687 (1991), the council noted a report by the Secretary-General and decided to establish the United Nations Iraq–Kuwait Observation Mission to monitor the demilitarized zone between Iraq and Kuwait, known as the Kuwait–Iraq barrier.

Acting under Chapter VII of the United Nations Charter, the council established the Mission for an initial period of six months, deciding to review the question of its termination every six months. Its presence was to deter border violations and monitor hostile or potentially hostile action mounted by either country against the other.

== See also ==
- 1991 uprisings in Iraq
- Gulf War
- Invasion of Kuwait
- Iraq–Kuwait relations
- Iraqi no-fly zones
- List of United Nations Security Council Resolutions 601 to 700 (1987–1991)
