= Iraq–Kuwait border =

International border

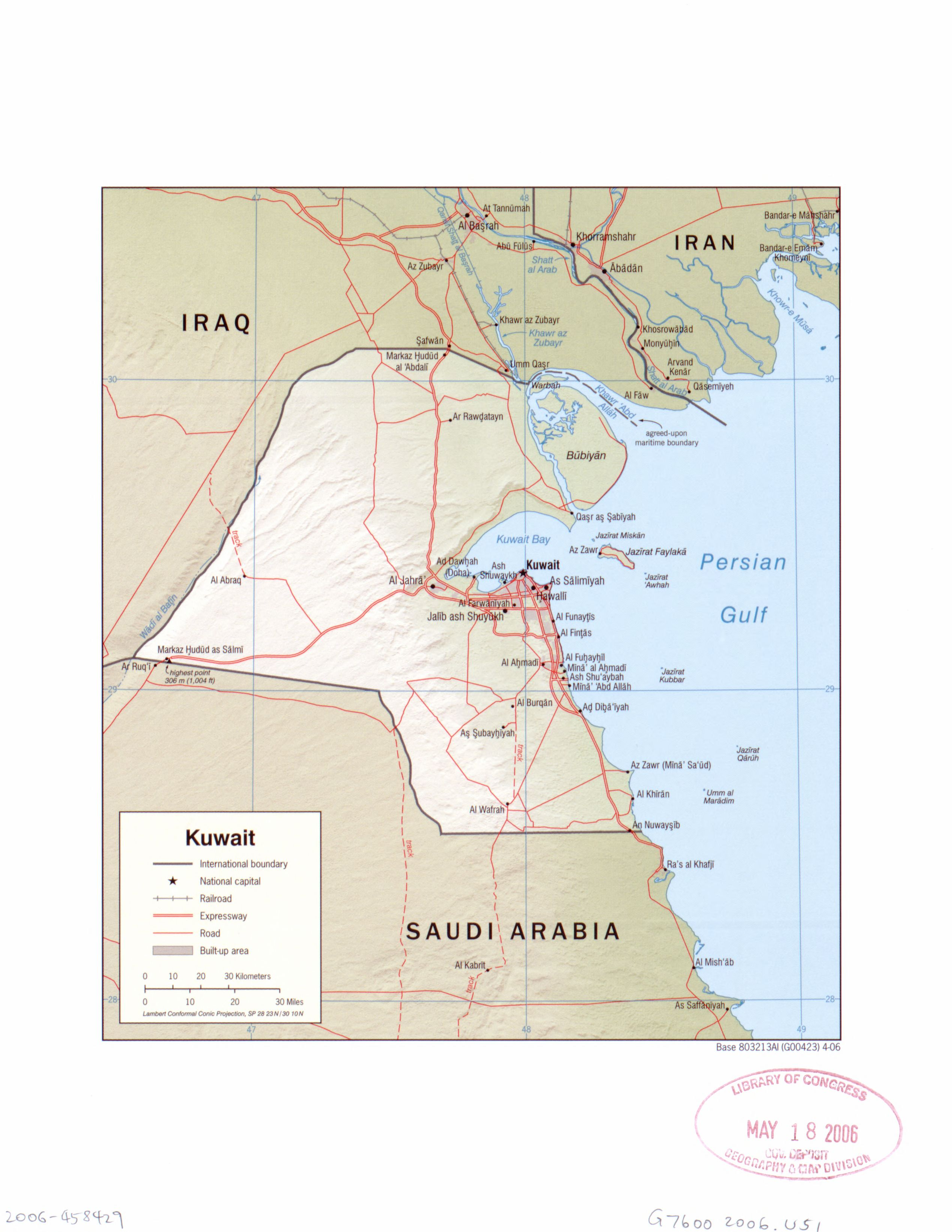
- Map of Kuwait, with Iraq to the north

Characteristics
- Entities: Iraq Kuwait
- Length: 254 km (158 mi)
- Enclave and exclaves: None

History
- Established: 1932; Confirmation of the border between Iraq and Kuwait after Iraq gained independence.
- Current shape: Yes; Ongoing as the official border between Iraq and Kuwait, with minor adjustments after the Gulf War.
- Disestablished: No
- Treaties: Anglo-Ottoman Convention of 1913 (not ratified), United Nations demarcation (1992)
- Notes: The border is marked by a 120 mi border barrier to prevent re-invasion of Kuwait by Iraq, with an additional iron barrier constructed in 2004.

The Iraq – Kuwait border is 254 km (158 mi) in length and runs from the tripoint with Saudi Arabia in the west to the Persian Gulf coast in the east.

== Description ==
The border starts in the west at the Saudi tripoint on the Wadi al-Batin, and then follows this wadi as it flows north-eastwards. The border then turns east, following a straight line for 32 km (20 mi), before another straight line veers to the south-east for 26 km (16 mi), terminating at the coast by the junction of the Khawr Abd Allah and Khor as Subiyah opposite Hajjam Island.

== History ==
Historically there was no clearly defined boundary in this part of the Middle East; Kuwait de jure fell under Basra Vilayet administration from 1875 until the end of World War I. At the start of the 20th century the Ottoman Empire controlled what is now Iraq and the United Kingdom de facto controlled Kuwait as a protectorate. The United Kingdom and the Ottoman Empire theoretically divided their realms of influence via the so-called "Blue" and "Violet lines" in the Anglo-Ottoman Convention of 1913, by which the Ottomans recognised British claims on Kuwait, divided from Ottoman Mesopotamia along the Wadi al-Batin (the so-called 'green line', see map right). The convention was never ratified therefore remained not binding. Finally, the Ottomans and British emerged as enemies within months of the convention, as the outbreak of World War I diminished any hope left for ratification.

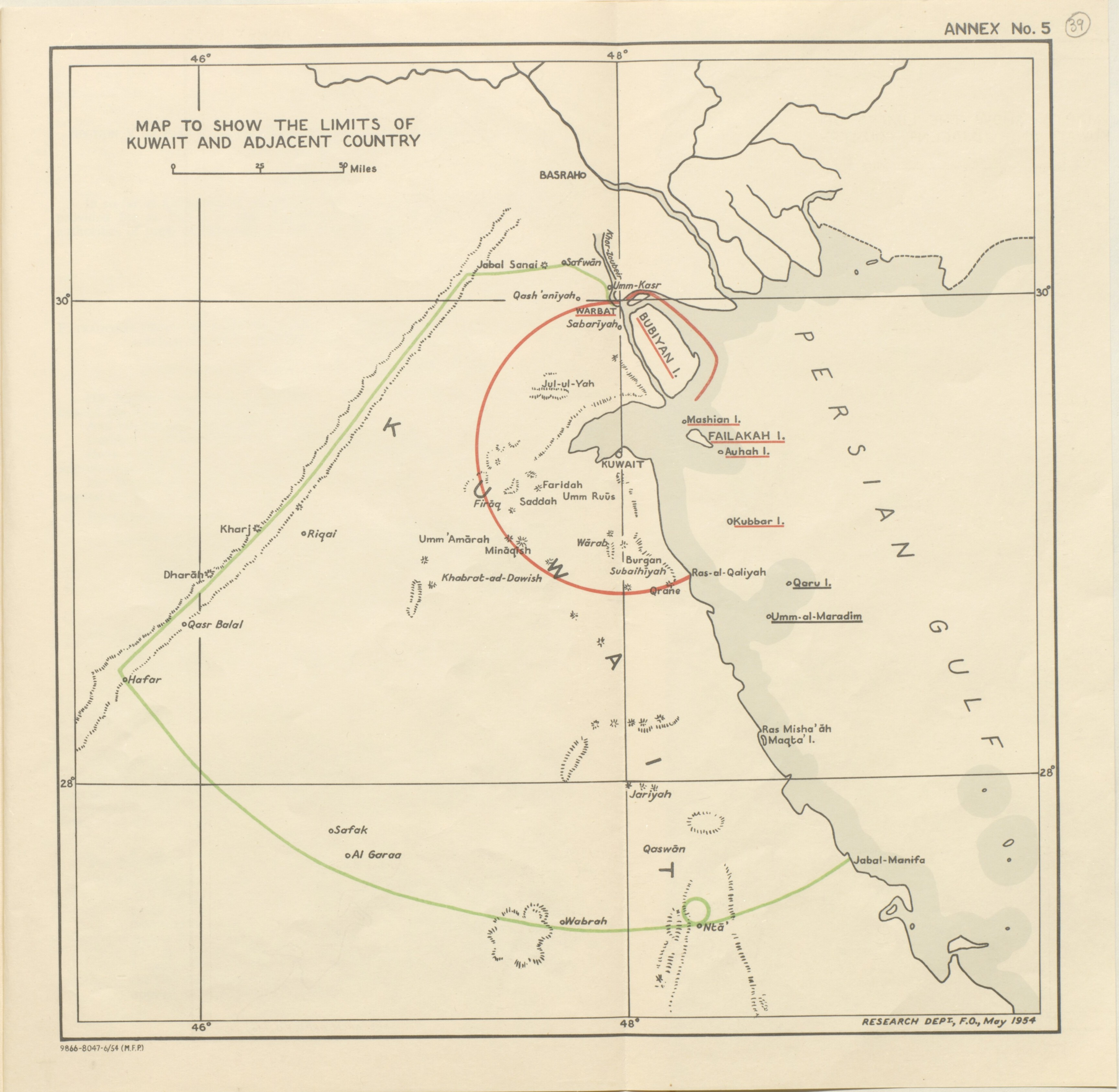
Map with red circle and green circle boundaries according to the Anglo-Ottoman Convention of 1913

During the First World War an Arab Revolt, supported by the United Kingdom, succeeded in removing the Ottomans from most of the Middle East. As a result of the secret 1916 Anglo-French Sykes-Picot Agreement the United Kingdom gained control of the Ottoman Vilayets of Mosul, Baghdad and Basra. After a revolt broke out in Iraq that demanded independence, the three Vilayets became mandatory Iraq in 1921, following a previous policy of centralization by Mamluks and Ottomans. In 1932, the year that Iraq gained independence, the United Kingdom confirmed that the border between Iraq and Kuwait would run along the Wadi al-Batin, as well as confirming that Bubiyan and Warbah islands were Kuwaiti territory, though the precise positioning of the northern straight line segments near Safwan remained imprecise.

Kuwait gained independence in 1961, though Iraq refused to recognise the country claiming it as part of Iraq, which resulted in a show of force by the United Kingdom and the Arab League in support of Kuwait. Following an Iraqi coup in 1963, a treaty of friendship was signed the same year by which Iraq recognised the 1932 border. Despite this, the treaty was never ratified thus remained unbinding, and was later rejected by the revolutionary command. Over the ensuing decade Iraq often raised the issue of sea access and the traditional claim to Kuwait, most notably in 1973 with the 1973 Samita border skirmish.

In 1990 Iraq invaded and annexed Kuwait. The invasion instigated the Gulf War, which restored Kuwait's sovereignty. In July 1992 the matter of border demarcation was referred to the United Nations, which accurately mapped the boundary and then demarcated it on the ground, following the 1932 line with some minor adjustments. The border initially was accepted by Kuwait but not Iraq. Iraq accepted the border in November 1994. The United Nations Iraq–Kuwait Observation Mission monitored the border during the period 1991–2003. Relations between the two states have improved since the fall of Saddam Hussein in 2003.

=== Barrier ===
The Iraq–Kuwait barrier (Arabic: حدود العراق-الكويت Hudud al-'Irāq-al-Kuwayt) is a 120-mile (190 km) border fence extending six miles (9.7 km) into Iraq, three miles (4.8 km) into Kuwait, and across the full length of their mutual border from Saudi Arabia to the Persian Gulf. Constructed by authorisation of the United Nations Security Council resolution 689, its stated purpose was to stop a re-invasion of Kuwait by Iraq.

The border barrier, made of electrified fencing and concertina wire, is braced by a 15-foot-wide (4.6 m) and 15-foot-deep (4.6 m) trench, complete with a 10-foot-high (3.0 m) dirt berm and guarded by hundreds of soldiers, several patrol boats, and helicopters. Construction of the barrier began in 1991.

In January 2004, Kuwait decided to install a new 135-mile (217 km) iron barrier along the border. The barrier was estimated to have cost $28 million and the entire length of the border; asphalted roads were also constructed to facilitate border security movement.

=== Maritime border ===
The 1992 UN demarcation of the Iraq–Kuwait border applied only to the land border, not the maritime border, which was deliberately left out. The dispute surrounds the region of the Khor Abdullah waterway. Although an agreement was reached in 2012, the dispute was not settled. In 2014 Kuwait provided maps to the United Nations, which Iraq said were not the agreed maps. In 2019 Iraq filed a formal compaint with the UN after Kuwait built a port facility on the Fasht Al A'aij shoal, and in 2023 an Iraqi court voided the 2012 agreement because the agreement did not receive proper approval from the Iraqi parliament. In February 2026 Iraq submitted a proposal which put the Fasht al-Qaid and Fasht al-Aij shoals in Iraqi territorial waters. Kuwait rejected Iraq's proposal, with Qatar, the United Arab Emirates, Oman, and Saudi Arabia taking Kuwait's side of the dispute.

== Settlements near the border ==
=== Iraq ===
- Safwan
- Umm Qasr

=== Kuwait ===
- Abdali

== See also ==
- Iraq–Kuwait relations
